= Wu Kuang-yu =

"Eddie" Wu Kuang-yu 吴光宇
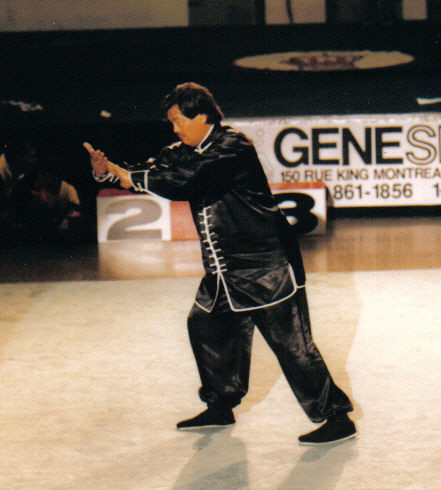
- Wu Kuang-yu demonstrating the posture "Grasp Bird's Tail" at a tournament
- Born: Wu Kuang-yu; 1946 (age 79–80)
- Nationality: Chinese Canadian
- Style: Wu-style tai chi

Other information
- Website: International Wu Style Tai Chi Chuan Federation

Wu Kuang-yu
- Traditional Chinese: 吳光宇
- Simplified Chinese: 吴光宇
Transcriptions
Standard Mandarin
- Hanyu Pinyin: Wú Guāngyǔ

"Eddie" Wu Kuang-yu or Wu Guangyu (born 1946) is a Chinese-Canadian tai chi teacher. He is the eldest son of the late Wu Ta-k'uei and senior instructor of the Wu family and "Gatekeeper" of the Wu-style as taught in the Wu's tai chi Academies internationally since the death of his uncle, the late Wu Daxin, in January 2005.

== Biography ==
Eddie Wu is the great-grandson of the late Wu Jianquan, and grandson of the late Wu Gongyi. His two sons, Austin Wu Chung Him (吳仲謙, born 1972) and Edward Wu Chung Wai (吳仲偉, born 1974) are also instructors in their family's school.

Eddie Wu started learning tai chi at the age of 6 from his grandfather Wu Gongyi, with whom he lived till age 12. Thereafter, Eddie Wu moved back to live with his father Wu Ta-k'uei and continued learning until he left for university. He later graduated and worked as an engineer for several years.

In 1975, Wu Daqi started the first Western Hemisphere Wu family school in Toronto, Canada. Shortly afterwards, he invited his thirty-year-old nephew Eddie Wu to take over the Toronto school's instruction.

Eddie Wu has promoted Wu-style tai chi in Asia, North America and Europe, with schools that recognise his supervision in Toronto, Fredericton, Ann Arbor, Metropolitan Detroit, New Jersey, Hawaii, London (England), Hong Kong, Singapore, Greece and Malaysia. He is assisted by his sister Cynthia Wu Hsiao Fung (born 1949).

== Tai chi lineage tree with Wu-style focus ==
Note:

- This lineage tree is not comprehensive, but depicts those considered the 'gate-keepers' & most recognized individuals in each generation of Wu-style.
- Although many styles were passed down to respective descendants of the same family, the lineage focused on is that of the Wu style & not necessarily that of the family.

Key:	NEIJIA
Solid lines	Direct teacher-student.
Dot lines	Partial influence /taught informally /limited time.	TAI CHI
Dash lines	Individual(s) omitted.
Dash cross	Branch continues.	CHEN-STYLE	Zhaobao-style
YANG-STYLE
(王蘭亭); Wang Lanting; 1840–? 2nd gen. Yang	Yang Jianhou; 1839–1917; 2nd gen. Yang; 2nd gen. Yangjia Michuan	Yang Banhou; 1837–1892; 2nd gen. Yang; 2nd gen. Guang Ping Yang; Yang Small Frame	WU (HAO)-STYLE	Zhaobao He-style
Li-style	Yang Shao-hou; 1862–1930; 3rd gen. Yang; Yang Small Frame	Wu Quanyou; 1834–1902; 1st gen. Wu
(齊閣臣); Qi Gechen; 2nd gen. Wu	(夏公甫); Xia Gongfu; 2nd gen. Wu	Wu Jianquan; 1870–1942; 2nd gen. Wu; WU-STYLE; 108 Form	(常遠亭); Chang Yuanting; 1860–1918; 2nd gen. Wu	(郭松亭); Guo Songting; 2nd gen. Wu	Wang Maozhai; 1862–1940; 2nd gen. Wu	SUN-STYLE
Dong Yingjie; 1891–1960; 4th gen. Yang	(齊敏軒); Qi Minxuan; 3rd gen. Wu	Cheng Wing Kwong; 1903–1967; 3rd gen. Wu	Wu Yinghua; 1907–1997; 3rd gen. Wu	Wu Gongyi; 1900–1970; 3rd gen. Wu	Wu Kung-tsao; 1903–1983; 3rd gen. Wu	Ma Yueliang; 1901–1998; 3rd gen. Wu	Yang Yuting; 1887–1982; 3rd gen. Wu
(鄭天熊); Cheng Tin Hung; 1930–2005; Wudang-style	Wu Ta-k'uei; 1923–1972; 4th gen. Wu	Wu Yanxia; 1930–2001; 4th gen. Wu	Wu Daxin; 1933–2005; 4th gen. Wu	(立群); Li Liqun; 1924–2013; 4th gen. Wu	Wang Peisheng; 1919–2004; 4th gen. Wu
Wu Kuang-yu; 1946–Present; 5th gen. Wu	(骆舒焕); Luo Shuhuan; 1935–1987; 5th gen. Wu
CHEN-STYLE	YANG-STYLE	WU-STYLE	SUN-STYLE	WU (HAO)-STYLE
