= Wu Yinghua =

Chinese teacher of Wu-style tai chi (1907–1996)

吴英华 Wu Yinghua
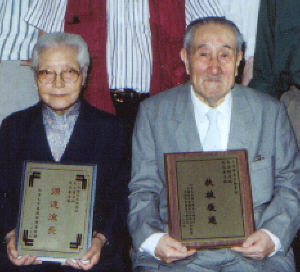
- Wu Yinghua on the left, Ma Yueliang on the right
- Born: 1907; Beijing, China
- Died: 1996 (aged 88–89); Shanghai, China
- Style: Wu-style tai chi

Other information
- Notable students: Ma Jiangbao (马江豹), Shi Meilin

Wu Yinghua
- Traditional Chinese: 吳英華
- Simplified Chinese: 吴英华
Transcriptions
Standard Mandarin
- Hanyu Pinyin: Wú Yīnghuá
- Wade–Giles: Wu2 Ying1-hua2

Wu Yinghua (1907–1996) was a famous Chinese teacher of Wu-style tai chi. She was born in Beijing and died in Shanghai. She was the eldest daughter of Wu Jianquan, the best known teacher of Wu-style tai chi. Her older brothers were Wu Gongyi and Wu Gongzao, also well-known tai chi practitioners.

== Biography ==
Wu Yinghua began studying tai chi at age nine, and by age seventeen, she was a full-time teacher in her father's school. In 1921, she was invited to teach tai chi in Shanghai. In 1928, her father followed her to Shanghai and she became his teaching assistant. In 1930, she married Ma Yueliang, who was Wu Jianquan's senior disciple. In 1933, Wu Jianquan founded the Jianquan Taijiquan Association (鑑泉太極拳社) in Shanghai. In 1935, after a fundraising effort, the association moved into a permanent hall on the tenth floor of the YMCA building on Xizang Road. Wu Jianquan died in 1942.

After the Cultural Revolution, it became possible around 1980 to teach tai chi publicly in China again. About this time, her brother Wu Gongzao was released from prison and moved to Hong Kong. Wu Yinghua and Ma Yueliang, remaining in mainland China, created a simplified Wu tai chi form, and were again able to have public meetings of the Jianquan Taijiquan Association. They taught a large number of students in Shanghai and in their travels to New Zealand, Germany and elsewhere. Together with Ma Yueliang, Wu Yinghua published several books on Wu-style tai chi. The books "Wu style Taijiquan: Forms, Concepts and Applications of the Original Style" (commonly known as the "Orange Book"), "Wu Simplified Taijiquan", and "Wu style Taiji Kuaiquan" (Wu-style tai chi fast form) have been collected in a single volume in China. They also co-authored a Wu-style sword book. Wu Yinghua was the senior instructor of the Wu family from 1983 until she died in 1996.

Ma Yueliang and Wu Yinghua are survived by several children and grandchildren, including: Ma Jiangchun (b. 1931), Dr. Ma Hailong (b. 1935), Ma Jiangbao (b. 1941), and Ma Jiangling (b. 1947). Ma Jiangbao lived in the Netherlands and taught traditional tai chi in Europe. He died in 2016. Their adopted daughter Shi Meilin now lives and teaches in New Zealand. She also has students in Switzerland, France and in the United States (Tucson, Arizona).

== Generational senior instructors of the Wu family ==
1st Generation

Wu Quanyou (吳全佑, 1834–1902), who learned from Yang Luchan and Yang Banhou, was senior instructor of the family from 1870-1902.

2nd generation

His oldest son, Wu Jianquan (1870–1942), was senior from 1902-1942.

3rd Generation

His oldest son, Wu Gongyi (1900–1970) was senior from 1942-1970.

3rd Generation

Wu Gongyi's younger brother, Wu Gongzao (1903–1983), was senior from 1970-1983.

3rd Generation

Wu Gongyi's younger sister, Wu Yinghua, was senior from 1983-1997.

4th Generation

Wu Gongyi's daughter, Wu Yanxia (1930–2001) was senior from 1997-2001.

4th Generation

Wu Gongzao's son, Wu Daxin (1933–2005), was senior from 2001-2005.

5th Generation

The current senior instructor of the Wu family is Wu Daokui's son Wu Kuang-yu.

== Tai chi lineage tree with Wu-style focus ==
Note:

- This lineage tree is not comprehensive, but depicts those considered the 'gate-keepers' & most recognized individuals in each generation of Wu-style.
- Although many styles were passed down to respective descendants of the same family, the lineage focused on is that of the Wu style & not necessarily that of the family.

Key:	NEIJIA
Solid lines	Direct teacher-student.
Dot lines	Partial influence /taught informally /limited time.	TAI CHI
Dash lines	Individual(s) omitted.
Dash cross	Branch continues.	CHEN-STYLE	Zhaobao-style
YANG-STYLE
(王蘭亭); Wang Lanting; 1840–? 2nd gen. Yang	Yang Jianhou; 1839–1917; 2nd gen. Yang; 2nd gen. Yangjia Michuan	Yang Banhou; 1837–1892; 2nd gen. Yang; 2nd gen. Guang Ping Yang; Yang Small Frame	WU (HAO)-STYLE	Zhaobao He-style
Li-style	Yang Shao-hou; 1862–1930; 3rd gen. Yang; Yang Small Frame	Wu Quanyou; 1834–1902; 1st gen. Wu
(齊閣臣); Qi Gechen; 2nd gen. Wu	(夏公甫); Xia Gongfu; 2nd gen. Wu	Wu Jianquan; 1870–1942; 2nd gen. Wu; WU-STYLE; 108 Form	(常遠亭); Chang Yuanting; 1860–1918; 2nd gen. Wu	(郭松亭); Guo Songting; 2nd gen. Wu	Wang Maozhai; 1862–1940; 2nd gen. Wu	SUN-STYLE
Dong Yingjie; 1891–1960; 4th gen. Yang	(齊敏軒); Qi Minxuan; 3rd gen. Wu	Cheng Wing Kwong; 1903–1967; 3rd gen. Wu	Wu Yinghua; 1907–1997; 3rd gen. Wu	Wu Gongyi; 1900–1970; 3rd gen. Wu	Wu Kung-tsao; 1903–1983; 3rd gen. Wu	Ma Yueliang; 1901–1998; 3rd gen. Wu	Yang Yuting; 1887–1982; 3rd gen. Wu
(鄭天熊); Cheng Tin Hung; 1930–2005; Wudang-style	Wu Ta-k'uei; 1923–1972; 4th gen. Wu	Wu Yanxia; 1930–2001; 4th gen. Wu	Wu Daxin; 1933–2005; 4th gen. Wu	(立群); Li Liqun; 1924–2013; 4th gen. Wu	Wang Peisheng; 1919–2004; 4th gen. Wu
Wu Kuang-yu; 1946–Present; 5th gen. Wu	(骆舒焕); Luo Shuhuan; 1935–1987; 5th gen. Wu
CHEN-STYLE	YANG-STYLE	WU-STYLE	SUN-STYLE	WU (HAO)-STYLE

== Bibliography ==
- Wu Kung-tsao. Wu Family T'ai Chi Ch'uan (吳家太極拳), Hong Kong, 1980, Toronto 2006, ISBN 978-0-9780499-0-4.
- Wu Yinghua, Ma Yueliang, Shi Meilin (1987). Wu Style Tai Chi Fast Form. Henan Science Skills Ltd. Henan (only available in Chinese) ISBN 978-7-5349-0121-8.
- Wu Yinghua, Ma Yueliang, Shi Meilin (1991). Wu Style Tai Chi Fast Form. Shanghai Book Co Ltd, Hong Kong (only available in Chinese) . ISBN 978-962-239-106-2.
- Wu Yinghua, Ma Yueliang(1993). Wu Style Tai Chi Chuan Forms, Concepts and Application of the Original Style. Shanghai Book Co Ltd, Hong Kong. ISBN 978-962-239-103-1.
- Ma Yueliang & Zee Wen(1986, 1990, 1995). Wu Style Tai Chi Chuan Push Hands. Shanghai Book Co Ltd, Hong Kong. ISBN 978-962-239-100-0.
- Dr. Wen Zee (2002) Wu Style Tai Chi Chuan, Ancient Chinese way to health. North Atlantic Books. ISBN 978-1-55643-389-4.
