= Wu Daxin =

- Born: November 26, 1933
- Died: January 16, 2005 (aged 71)
- Native name: 吴大新
- Nationality: Chinese
- Style: Wu-style tai chi

Other information

Chinese name
- Simplified Chinese: 吴大新
- Traditional Chinese: 吳大新
Transcriptions
Standard Mandarin
- Hanyu Pinyin: Wú Dàxīn
- Wade–Giles: Wu^{2} Ta^{4}-hsin^{1}
Yue: Cantonese
- Yale Romanization: Ng4 Daai6 San1

Wu Daxin or Wu Ta-hsin (1933–2005) was a Chinese tai chi teacher who lived most of his life in Hong Kong. He was the great-grandson Wu-style tai chi founder Wu Quanyou and the grandson of the well-known teacher Wu Jianquan. He directed the Wu family's lineage for four years from the Wu family headquarters in Hong Kong after the death of his cousin Wu Yanxia.

== Biography ==
Born into a Manchu military family known for their contributions towards preserving knowledge of the traditional Chinese martial arts, Wu Daxin endured strict training from his grandfather Wu Jianquan, uncle Wu Gongyi and father Wu Kung-tsao. He eventually became known as a teacher and for his expertise with the tai chi sabre and sword as well as for his qigong and pushing hands skills.

When Wu Gongyi moved with his family to Hong Kong in the 1940s, Wu Daxin assisted him in the promotion and teaching of tai chi. During the 1950s, at the direction of Wu Gongyi, Wu Daxin and his cousins Wu Ta-k'uei and Wu Daqi often travelled to Malaysia and Singapore to start and manage several Wu style academies. Later in his life, he also travelled extensively to North America, teaching tai chi in Toronto, Detroit and Vancouver.

== Generational senior instructors of the Wu family ==
1st Generation

- Wu Quanyou (1834–1902), who learned from Yang Luchan and Yang Banhou, was founded Wu-style tai chi and was its senior instructor from 1870 until his death.

2nd generation

- His oldest son, Wu Jianquan (1870–1942), was senior instructor from 1902 to 1942.

3rd Generation

- His oldest son, Wu Gongyi (1900–1970) was senior instructor from 1942 to 1970.
- Wu Kung-i's younger brother, Wu Kung-tsao (1903–1983) was senior instructor from 1970 to 1983.
- Wu Kung-i's younger sister, Wu Yinghua (1907–1997) was senior instructor from 1983 to 1997.

4th Generation

- Wu Kung-i's daughter, Wu Yanxia (1930–2001) was senior from 1997 to 2001.
- Wu Daxin (Wu Kung-tsao's son) was senior from 2001 to 2005.

5th Generation

- The current senior instructor of the Wu family is Wu Ta-k'uei's son Wu Kuang-yu, born 1946.

== Tai chi lineage tree with Wu-style focus ==
Note:

- This lineage tree is not comprehensive, but depicts those considered the 'gate-keepers' & most recognized individuals in each generation of Wu-style.
- Although many styles were passed down to respective descendants of the same family, the lineage focused on is that of the Wu style & not necessarily that of the family.

Key:	NEIJIA
Solid lines	Direct teacher-student.
Dot lines	Partial influence /taught informally /limited time.	TAI CHI
Dash lines	Individual(s) omitted.
Dash cross	Branch continues.	CHEN-STYLE	Zhaobao-style
YANG-STYLE
(王蘭亭); Wang Lanting; 1840–? 2nd gen. Yang	Yang Jianhou; 1839–1917; 2nd gen. Yang; 2nd gen. Yangjia Michuan	Yang Banhou; 1837–1892; 2nd gen. Yang; 2nd gen. Guang Ping Yang; Yang Small Frame	WU (HAO)-STYLE	Zhaobao He-style
Li-style	Yang Shao-hou; 1862–1930; 3rd gen. Yang; Yang Small Frame	Wu Quanyou; 1834–1902; 1st gen. Wu
(齊閣臣); Qi Gechen; 2nd gen. Wu	(夏公甫); Xia Gongfu; 2nd gen. Wu	Wu Jianquan; 1870–1942; 2nd gen. Wu; WU-STYLE; 108 Form	(常遠亭); Chang Yuanting; 1860–1918; 2nd gen. Wu	(郭松亭); Guo Songting; 2nd gen. Wu	Wang Maozhai; 1862–1940; 2nd gen. Wu	SUN-STYLE
Dong Yingjie; 1891–1960; 4th gen. Yang	(齊敏軒); Qi Minxuan; 3rd gen. Wu	Cheng Wing Kwong; 1903–1967; 3rd gen. Wu	Wu Yinghua; 1907–1997; 3rd gen. Wu	Wu Gongyi; 1900–1970; 3rd gen. Wu	Wu Kung-tsao; 1903–1983; 3rd gen. Wu	Ma Yueliang; 1901–1998; 3rd gen. Wu	Yang Yuting; 1887–1982; 3rd gen. Wu
(鄭天熊); Cheng Tin Hung; 1930–2005; Wudang-style	Wu Ta-k'uei; 1923–1972; 4th gen. Wu	Wu Yanxia; 1930–2001; 4th gen. Wu	Wu Daxin; 1933–2005; 4th gen. Wu	(立群); Li Liqun; 1924–2013; 4th gen. Wu	Wang Peisheng; 1919–2004; 4th gen. Wu
Wu Kuang-yu; 1946–Present; 5th gen. Wu	(骆舒焕); Luo Shuhuan; 1935–1987; 5th gen. Wu
CHEN-STYLE	YANG-STYLE	WU-STYLE	SUN-STYLE	WU (HAO)-STYLE
