= Wang Peisheng =

Chinese martial artist (1919–2004)

- Born: 1919; Wuqing, Hebei, China
- Died: 2004 (aged 84–85); Beijing, China
- Other names: official Name: Wang Liquan, Buddhist Name or fahao: Yin Cheng (印城)
- Nationality: Chinese
- Style: Wu-style tai chi Baguazhang

Other information
- Notable students: Luo Shuhuan (骆舒焕); Zhang Yun (张云); Zhao Zeren (赵泽仁); Gao Zhuangfei (高壮飞); Zhu Xilin (朱喜霖)

Wang Peisheng
- Chinese: 王培生
Transcriptions
Standard Mandarin
- Hanyu Pinyin: Wáng Péishēng
- Wade–Giles: Wang2 P'ei2-sheng1

Wang Peisheng (Chinese: 王培生; pinyin: Wáng Péishēng; Wade–Giles: Wang P'ei-sheng; 1919–2004) was a Chinese teacher of Wu-style tai chi. He was a student of Yang Yuting and Wang Maozhai.

== Biography ==
Although most famous for his tai chi, Wang began training in martial arts with the Ma Gui, learning Yin-style Baguazhang 64 Palms. At the age of 15, he became a teaching assistant to tai chi master Yang Yuting. After Yang's death in 1982, Wang became the head of the Northern Wu-style tai chi group in Beijing.

Wang was also very skilled in tongbeiquan, tantui, xingyiquan, and bajiquan, having studied with famous masters of each of these arts. He was noted for his expertise in the self-defence methods of Wu-style tai chi. In the 1950s he developed a shortened 37 posture Wu-style form presented in his book 'Wu-Style Tai Chi' (Zhaohua Publishing House, Beijing, 1983).

== Tai chi lineage tree with Wu-style focus ==
Note:

- This lineage tree is not comprehensive, but depicts those considered the 'gate-keepers' & most recognized individuals in each generation of Wu-style.
- Although many styles were passed down to respective descendants of the same family, the lineage focused on is that of the Wu style & not necessarily that of the family.

Key:	NEIJIA
Solid lines	Direct teacher-student.
Dot lines	Partial influence /taught informally /limited time.	TAI CHI
Dash lines	Individual(s) omitted.
Dash cross	Branch continues.	CHEN-STYLE	Zhaobao-style
YANG-STYLE
(王蘭亭); Wang Lanting; 1840–? 2nd gen. Yang	Yang Jianhou; 1839–1917; 2nd gen. Yang; 2nd gen. Yangjia Michuan	Yang Banhou; 1837–1892; 2nd gen. Yang; 2nd gen. Guang Ping Yang; Yang Small Frame	WU (HAO)-STYLE	Zhaobao He-style
Li-style	Yang Shao-hou; 1862–1930; 3rd gen. Yang; Yang Small Frame	Wu Quanyou; 1834–1902; 1st gen. Wu
(齊閣臣); Qi Gechen; 2nd gen. Wu	(夏公甫); Xia Gongfu; 2nd gen. Wu	Wu Jianquan; 1870–1942; 2nd gen. Wu; WU-STYLE; 108 Form	(常遠亭); Chang Yuanting; 1860–1918; 2nd gen. Wu	(郭松亭); Guo Songting; 2nd gen. Wu	Wang Maozhai; 1862–1940; 2nd gen. Wu	SUN-STYLE
Dong Yingjie; 1891–1960; 4th gen. Yang	(齊敏軒); Qi Minxuan; 3rd gen. Wu	Cheng Wing Kwong; 1903–1967; 3rd gen. Wu	Wu Yinghua; 1907–1997; 3rd gen. Wu	Wu Gongyi; 1900–1970; 3rd gen. Wu	Wu Kung-tsao; 1903–1983; 3rd gen. Wu	Ma Yueliang; 1901–1998; 3rd gen. Wu	Yang Yuting; 1887–1982; 3rd gen. Wu
(鄭天熊); Cheng Tin Hung; 1930–2005; Wudang-style	Wu Ta-k'uei; 1923–1972; 4th gen. Wu	Wu Yanxia; 1930–2001; 4th gen. Wu	Wu Daxin; 1933–2005; 4th gen. Wu	(立群); Li Liqun; 1924–2013; 4th gen. Wu	Wang Peisheng; 1919–2004; 4th gen. Wu
Wu Kuang-yu; 1946–Present; 5th gen. Wu	(骆舒焕); Luo Shuhuan; 1935–1987; 5th gen. Wu
CHEN-STYLE	YANG-STYLE	WU-STYLE	SUN-STYLE	WU (HAO)-STYLE
