= Yang Yuting (martial artist) =

Chinese martial artist (1887-1982)

- Born: 1887
- Died: 1982 (aged 94–95)
- Style: Wu-style tai chi

Other information
- Notable students: Wang Peisheng; Li Jingwu; Li Bingci

Yang Yuting
- Simplified Chinese: 杨禹廷
Transcriptions
Standard Mandarin
- Hanyu Pinyin: Yáng Yǔtíng
- Wade–Giles: Yang2 Yü3-t'ing2

Yang Yuting (Chinese: 杨禹廷; pinyin: Yáng Yǔtíng; Wade–Giles: Yang Yü-t'ing; 1887–1982) was a Chinese teacher of Wu-style tai chi. He was Wang Maozhai's primary disciple and studied with him for a quarter of a century, from 1916 to 1940.

== Biography ==
He began training in martial arts from the age of nine. He had a number of masters and learned Tan Tui, changquan, xingyiquan, baguazhang and Wu-style tai chi.

He reformed his Wu-style training to make it more systematic and standardised the Wu-style tai chi he had learned from Wang Maozhai. After Wang's death, Yang became the leader of the Wu-style Beijing group. He was a respected teacher in Beijing for 75 years and at the time of his death vice-chairman of Beijing Martial Arts Association (北京市武术运动协会副主席), a highly prestigious position within Beijing martial art community. Wang Peisheng, Li Jingwu and Li Bingci were all his students.

== Tai chi lineage tree with Wu-style focus ==
Note:

- This lineage tree is not comprehensive, but depicts those considered the 'gate-keepers' & most recognized individuals in each generation of Wu-style.
- Although many styles were passed down to respective descendants of the same family, the lineage focused on is that of the Wu style & not necessarily that of the family.

Key:	NEIJIA
Solid lines	Direct teacher-student.
Dot lines	Partial influence /taught informally /limited time.	TAI CHI
Dash lines	Individual(s) omitted.
Dash cross	Branch continues.	CHEN-STYLE	Zhaobao-style
YANG-STYLE
(王蘭亭); Wang Lanting; 1840–? 2nd gen. Yang	Yang Jianhou; 1839–1917; 2nd gen. Yang; 2nd gen. Yangjia Michuan	Yang Banhou; 1837–1892; 2nd gen. Yang; 2nd gen. Guang Ping Yang; Yang Small Frame	WU (HAO)-STYLE	Zhaobao He-style
Li-style	Yang Shao-hou; 1862–1930; 3rd gen. Yang; Yang Small Frame	Wu Quanyou; 1834–1902; 1st gen. Wu
(齊閣臣); Qi Gechen; 2nd gen. Wu	(夏公甫); Xia Gongfu; 2nd gen. Wu	Wu Jianquan; 1870–1942; 2nd gen. Wu; WU-STYLE; 108 Form	(常遠亭); Chang Yuanting; 1860–1918; 2nd gen. Wu	(郭松亭); Guo Songting; 2nd gen. Wu	Wang Maozhai; 1862–1940; 2nd gen. Wu	SUN-STYLE
Dong Yingjie; 1891–1960; 4th gen. Yang	(齊敏軒); Qi Minxuan; 3rd gen. Wu	Cheng Wing Kwong; 1903–1967; 3rd gen. Wu	Wu Yinghua; 1907–1997; 3rd gen. Wu	Wu Gongyi; 1900–1970; 3rd gen. Wu	Wu Kung-tsao; 1903–1983; 3rd gen. Wu	Ma Yueliang; 1901–1998; 3rd gen. Wu	Yang Yuting; 1887–1982; 3rd gen. Wu
(鄭天熊); Cheng Tin Hung; 1930–2005; Wudang-style	Wu Ta-k'uei; 1923–1972; 4th gen. Wu	Wu Yanxia; 1930–2001; 4th gen. Wu	Wu Daxin; 1933–2005; 4th gen. Wu	(立群); Li Liqun; 1924–2013; 4th gen. Wu	Wang Peisheng; 1919–2004; 4th gen. Wu
Wu Kuang-yu; 1946–Present; 5th gen. Wu	(骆舒焕); Luo Shuhuan; 1935–1987; 5th gen. Wu
CHEN-STYLE	YANG-STYLE	WU-STYLE	SUN-STYLE	WU (HAO)-STYLE
