= Ma Yueliang =

Chinese martial artist (1901–1998)

Ma Yueliang 馬岳樑
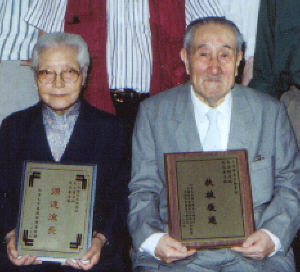
- His wife Wu Yinghua on the left, and Ma Yueliang on the right
- Born: 1 August 1901; China
- Died: 13 March 1998 (aged 96)
- Nationality: Chinese
- Style: Wu-style tai chi, Shaolinquan, Three Emperors Pao Chui, Baguazhang, Tongbeiquan

Other information
- Notable students: Li Liqun; Ma Jiangbao; Shi Mei Lin

Ma Yueliang
- Traditional Chinese: 馬岳樑
- Simplified Chinese: 马岳梁
Transcriptions
Standard Mandarin
- Hanyu Pinyin: Mǎ Yuèliáng
- Wade–Giles: Ma3 Yueh4-liang2

Ma Yueliang or Ma Yueh-liang (1 August 1901 – 13 March 1998) was a famous Manchu teacher of tai chi. He was the senior disciple of Wu Jianquan, the founder of Wu-style tai chi, and married Wu's daughter Wu Yinghua in 1930.

== Biography ==
Ma Yueliang trained in laboratory medicine at the Peking Union Medical College, graduating around 1923 with a specialty in hematology, before relocating to Shanghai in 1929. He established the First Medical Examination and Experiment Office and ran the blood clinics at Zhongshan Hospital in Shanghai. Like Wu Quanyou and Wu Jianquan, Ma was of Manchu descent. Ma was educated both in the traditions traditional Chinese medicine and Western science.

There are accounts that Ma was a gifted martial artist in his youth. He had studied a number of martial arts including, Shaolinquan, Three Emperors Pao Chui, Baguazhang and Tongbeiquan. However, Wu Jianquan would accept Ma as a student only if he concentrated on Wu-style tai chi. From about age 18, Ma exclusively studied Wu-style tai chi. Wu Jianquan started the Jianquan Taijiquan Association in Shanghai in 1933, and Ma became the deputy director of the association. Ma studied tai chi with Wu Jianquan until the latter's death in 1942. The Jianquan Association still exists today internationally and remains a resource for the study of Wu-style tai chi.

It is difficult to overstate the importance of Ma Yueliang and his wife in the emergence of Wu-style tai chi after the Cultural Revolution in China. Even at an advanced age, Ma was named one of the honorees in the Election of the Top 100 Chinese Wushu Masters, with the selection held in Beijing in July 1994 and results announced in Laiyang, Shandong in December 1995.

Wu Yinghua and Ma continued to teach in tai chi until their deaths. They taught a large number of students together in Shanghai for over sixty years, and both later traveled to perform in Australia, New Zealand and Hong Kong. Ma Yueliang also traveled individually to teach in Germany, Austria and the Netherlands, according to his own account.

They published several books on Wu-style tai chi, including the "Orange Book" relied upon today by Wu-stylists throughout the world. Ma and Wu Yinghua's Wu-style sword/weapons book includes a family picture with several of their closest students. Ma Yueliang also publicly practiced a number of formerly closed door (private or family secret) forms and methods so that they would not be lost.

In public, Wu Yinghua would often demonstrate the Wu-style Slow Set and Ma would follow by demonstrating the Wu Style Tai Chi Fast Form. Ma taught many high level students, including Xie Bingcan and Fei Gua-ching, who is still active in the Jianquan Taijiquan Association in Shanghai. Li Liqun is one of Grandmaster Ma's oldest and closest living students. He was the deputy vice-secretary of the Jianquan Association in Shanghai under masters Ma and his wife Wu Yinghua.

Ma Yueliang and Wu Yinghua are survived by their children and grandchildren, including: Ma Jiangchun (b. 1931), Dr. Ma Hailong (1935–2022), Ma Jiangbao (1941–2016), and Ma Jiangling (b. 1947). Ma Jiangbao lived in the Netherlands and taught traditional tai chi throughout Europe. Their adopted daughter Shi Mei Lin now lives and teaches Wu-style tai chi in New Zealand. She also has students in France and the United States.

== Bibliography ==
- Wu Kung-tsao. Wu Family T'ai Chi Ch'uan (吳家太極拳) Hong Kong 1980, Toronto 2006, ISBN 0-9780499-0-X
- Wu Yinghua, Ma Yueliang, Shi Mei Lin (1987). Wu Style Tai Chi Fast Form. Henan Science Skills Ltd. Henan (only available in Chinese) ISBN 7-5349-0121-9/G122.
- Wu Yinghua, Ma Yueliang, Shi Mei Lin (1991). Wu Style Tai Chi Fast Form. Shanghai Book Co Ltd, Hong Kong (only available in Chinese) . ISBN 962-239-106-0.
- Wu Yinghua, Ma Yueliang (1993). Wu Style Tai Chi Chuan Forms, Concepts and Application of the Original Style. Shanghai Book Co Ltd, Hong Kong. ISBN 962-239-103-6.
- Ma Yueliang & Zee Wen (1986, 1990, 1995). Wu Style Tai Chi Chuan Push Hands. Shanghai Book Co Ltd, Hong Kong. ISBN 962-239-100-1.
- Dr Zee Wen (2002) Wu Style Tai Chi Chuan, Ancient Chinese way to health. North Atlantic Books. ISBN 978-1-55643-389-4.

== Tai chi lineage tree with Wu-style focus ==
Note:

- This lineage tree is not comprehensive, but depicts those considered the 'gate-keepers' & most recognized individuals in each generation of Wu-style.
- Although many styles were passed down to respective descendants of the same family, the lineage focused on is that of the Wu style & not necessarily that of the family.

Key:	NEIJIA
Solid lines	Direct teacher-student.
Dot lines	Partial influence /taught informally /limited time.	TAI CHI
Dash lines	Individual(s) omitted.
Dash cross	Branch continues.	CHEN-STYLE	Zhaobao-style
YANG-STYLE
(王蘭亭); Wang Lanting; 1840–? 2nd gen. Yang	Yang Jianhou; 1839–1917; 2nd gen. Yang; 2nd gen. Yangjia Michuan	Yang Banhou; 1837–1892; 2nd gen. Yang; 2nd gen. Guang Ping Yang; Yang Small Frame	WU (HAO)-STYLE	Zhaobao He-style
Li-style	Yang Shao-hou; 1862–1930; 3rd gen. Yang; Yang Small Frame	Wu Quanyou; 1834–1902; 1st gen. Wu
(齊閣臣); Qi Gechen; 2nd gen. Wu	(夏公甫); Xia Gongfu; 2nd gen. Wu	Wu Jianquan; 1870–1942; 2nd gen. Wu; WU-STYLE; 108 Form	(常遠亭); Chang Yuanting; 1860–1918; 2nd gen. Wu	(郭松亭); Guo Songting; 2nd gen. Wu	Wang Maozhai; 1862–1940; 2nd gen. Wu	SUN-STYLE
Dong Yingjie; 1891–1960; 4th gen. Yang	(齊敏軒); Qi Minxuan; 3rd gen. Wu	Cheng Wing Kwong; 1903–1967; 3rd gen. Wu	Wu Yinghua; 1907–1997; 3rd gen. Wu	Wu Gongyi; 1900–1970; 3rd gen. Wu	Wu Kung-tsao; 1903–1983; 3rd gen. Wu	Ma Yueliang; 1901–1998; 3rd gen. Wu	Yang Yuting; 1887–1982; 3rd gen. Wu
(鄭天熊); Cheng Tin Hung; 1930–2005; Wudang-style	Wu Ta-k'uei; 1923–1972; 4th gen. Wu	Wu Yanxia; 1930–2001; 4th gen. Wu	Wu Daxin; 1933–2005; 4th gen. Wu	(立群); Li Liqun; 1924–2013; 4th gen. Wu	Wang Peisheng; 1919–2004; 4th gen. Wu
Wu Kuang-yu; 1946–Present; 5th gen. Wu	(骆舒焕); Luo Shuhuan; 1935–1987; 5th gen. Wu
CHEN-STYLE	YANG-STYLE	WU-STYLE	SUN-STYLE	WU (HAO)-STYLE
