= Shi Mei Lin =

- Shi Mei Lin demonstrating Wu-style t'ai chi sword in New Zealand, 2008
- Style: Wu-style tai chi

Shi Mei Lin is a teacher of Wu-style tai chi. She is the adopted daughter of Wu Yinghua and Ma Yueliang, who were both famous teachers of Wu-style tai chi.

A Wushu and tai chi champion in the 1970s and 1980s, she toured with Chinese Wushu teams internationally, including the United States as part of the 1974 China national wushu team which also included Jet Li (Li Lianjie). She is a graduate from the Beijing Sports and Cultural University in Chinese Martial Arts and was a member of the Shanghai Wushu Team. In later years she coached Wushu in Shanghai and later the Taiwanese Wushu Team in 1994. She is the current head Wushu Taolu coach of the New Zealand Kung Fu Wushu Federation. The NZKWF is New Zealand's representative for Chinese Martial Arts to the International Wushu Federation (IWUF).

Shi Mei Lin often represented Wu-style tai chi with Grand Master Ma Yueliang and Grand Master Wu Yinghua at martial arts demonstrations, competitions and conferences in China. She also co-authored the book "Wu-style tai chi fast form" with Grand Master Ma and Grand Master Wu.

In 1983 Shi Mei Lin demonstrated the Wu-style tai chi Fast Form at the All China Traditional Martial Arts competition in Nanchang where she received the Award of Excellence. In 1986 she won the Chinese National taijijian (tai chi sword) competition as well as becoming the Wu-style tai chi Champion.

In 1988 Shi Mei Lin emigrated to the Netherlands and then later New Zealand where she now lives and teaches Wu-style tai chi and Wushu. She also has students in Europe and the United States.

Wu-style t'ai chi was created by a Manchu named Wu Quanyou (1834–1902). Wu was a student of Yang Luchan, founder of the Yang style, and Yang Banhou. Wu Quanyou's son, Wu Jianquan (1870–1942), studied under the tutorship of his father. After 1912 he developed the teaching of tai chi at the Beijing Sport Research Society, gradually refining his father’s style. His two sons, Wu Gongyi and Wu Gongzao, were his first students.

Wu Jianquan’s eldest daughter Wu Yinghua (1907–1996), started studying tai chi with her father at a very young age. In 1935 Wu Yinghua was also appointed deputy director of the Jian Quan Association in Shanghai. She married her father’s student, Ma Yueliang (1901–1998), and throughout her life she taught with her husband all over China. Both Wu Yinghua and Ma Yueliang were very highly regarded in martial arts circles.
