= Wu Ta-k'uei =

Chinese martial artist (1923–1972)

Wu Ta-k'uei 吳大揆
- Born: 1923; Beijing, China
- Died: 1972 (aged 48–49)
- Style: Wu-style tai chi

Other information
- Notable students: Wu Kuang-yu

Wu Ta-k'uei
- Traditional Chinese: 吳大揆
Transcriptions
Standard Mandarin
- Hanyu Pinyin: Wú Dàkuí
- Wade–Giles: Wu^{2} Ta^{4}-k'uei^{2}
Yue: Cantonese
- Yale Romanization: Ng4 Daai6 Kwai4

Wu Ta-k'uei or Wu Dakui (1923–1972) was a Chinese Wu-style tai chi teacher of Manchu ancestry.

== Biography ==
The oldest son of Wu Gongyi, he was born in Beijing, raised in Shanghai (where he was first taught tai chi by his grandfather, Wu Jianquan) and spent most of his adult life teaching in Hong Kong. Wu Ta-k'uei was active in the resistance to the Japanese invasion of China, yet he later taught martial arts in Japan after the war.

Wu Ta-k'uei was reputed to be a fierce fighter, and known as always ready to accept a challenge match. He is reported to have never been defeated, and to have been famous for badly injuring and taunting his opponents in those matches. An attested story circulated about Wu Ta-k'uei was about a fight that started in a Hong Kong dockside bar between an unarmed Wu Ta-k'uei and "over 30" stevedores armed with clubs and boathooks. The dockworkers eventually fled to a local police station for protection from the enraged Wu. Interviews with dockworkers and the police records of this fight led to sensational newspaper headlines in Kowloon and Hong Kong.

Wu Ta-k'uei assisted his father and his uncle Wu Kung-tsao to set up academies in Hong Kong, Macau and Singapore. He also sat on the Advisory Board of the Martial Art Association in Hong Kong and taught martial arts in the Kowloon Police Force.

His oldest son, Eddie Wu Kuang-yu, is the current "gate-keeper" of the Wu family.

== Generational senior instructors of the Wu family ==
1st Generation

- Wu Quanyou (1834–1902), who learned from Yang Luchan and Yang Banhou, was senior instructor of the family from 1870-1902.

2nd generation

- His oldest son, Wu Jianquan (1870–1942), was the senior instructor from 1902-1942.

3rd Generation

- His oldest son, Wu Gongyi (1900–1970) was senior from 1942-1970.
- Wu Gongyi's younger brother, Wu Kung-tsao (1903–1983), was senior from 1970-1983.
- Wu Gongyi's younger sister, Wu Yinghua (1907–1997), was senior from 1983-1997.

4th Generation

- Wu Gongyi's daughter, Wu Yanxia (1930–2001) was senior from 1997-2001.
- Wu Kung-tsao's son, Wu Daxin (1933–2005), was senior from 2001-2005.

5th Generation

- The current senior instructor of the Wu family is Wu Ta-k'uei's son Wu Kuang-yu (born 1946).

== Tai chi lineage tree with Wu-style focus ==
Note:

- This lineage tree is not comprehensive, but depicts those considered the 'gate-keepers' & most recognized individuals in each generation of Wu-style.
- Although many styles were passed down to respective descendants of the same family, the lineage focused on is that of the Wu style & not necessarily that of the family.

Key:	NEIJIA
Solid lines	Direct teacher-student.
Dot lines	Partial influence /taught informally /limited time.	TAI CHI
Dash lines	Individual(s) omitted.
Dash cross	Branch continues.	CHEN-STYLE	Zhaobao-style
YANG-STYLE
(王蘭亭); Wang Lanting; 1840–? 2nd gen. Yang	Yang Jianhou; 1839–1917; 2nd gen. Yang; 2nd gen. Yangjia Michuan	Yang Banhou; 1837–1892; 2nd gen. Yang; 2nd gen. Guang Ping Yang; Yang Small Frame	WU (HAO)-STYLE	Zhaobao He-style
Li-style	Yang Shao-hou; 1862–1930; 3rd gen. Yang; Yang Small Frame	Wu Quanyou; 1834–1902; 1st gen. Wu
(齊閣臣); Qi Gechen; 2nd gen. Wu	(夏公甫); Xia Gongfu; 2nd gen. Wu	Wu Jianquan; 1870–1942; 2nd gen. Wu; WU-STYLE; 108 Form	(常遠亭); Chang Yuanting; 1860–1918; 2nd gen. Wu	(郭松亭); Guo Songting; 2nd gen. Wu	Wang Maozhai; 1862–1940; 2nd gen. Wu	SUN-STYLE
Dong Yingjie; 1891–1960; 4th gen. Yang	(齊敏軒); Qi Minxuan; 3rd gen. Wu	Cheng Wing Kwong; 1903–1967; 3rd gen. Wu	Wu Yinghua; 1907–1997; 3rd gen. Wu	Wu Gongyi; 1900–1970; 3rd gen. Wu	Wu Kung-tsao; 1903–1983; 3rd gen. Wu	Ma Yueliang; 1901–1998; 3rd gen. Wu	Yang Yuting; 1887–1982; 3rd gen. Wu
(鄭天熊); Cheng Tin Hung; 1930–2005; Wudang-style	Wu Ta-k'uei; 1923–1972; 4th gen. Wu	Wu Yanxia; 1930–2001; 4th gen. Wu	Wu Daxin; 1933–2005; 4th gen. Wu	(立群); Li Liqun; 1924–2013; 4th gen. Wu	Wang Peisheng; 1919–2004; 4th gen. Wu
Wu Kuang-yu; 1946–Present; 5th gen. Wu	(骆舒焕); Luo Shuhuan; 1935–1987; 5th gen. Wu
CHEN-STYLE	YANG-STYLE	WU-STYLE	SUN-STYLE	WU (HAO)-STYLE

== See also ==
- 108-form Wu family tai chi
