= Wu Kung-tsao =

Tai Chi teacher

Wu Kung-tsao 吴公藻
- Born: 1903
- Died: 1983 (aged 80–81)
- Nationality: Chinese
- Style: Wu-style tai chi

Other information
- Notable students: Wu Daxin

Wu Kung-tsao
- Traditional Chinese: 吳公藻
Transcriptions
Standard Mandarin
- Hanyu Pinyin: Wú Gōngzǎo
- Wade–Giles: Wu^{2} Kung^{1}-tsao^{3}
Yue: Cantonese
- Yale Romanization: Ng4 Gung1 Jou2

Wu Kung-tsao or Wu Gongzao (1903–1983) was a famous Chinese teacher of tai chi. He taught in Beijing, Shanghai, Changsha and Hong Kong. He was the second son of Wu Jianquan, the best-known teacher of Wu-style tai chi, and the grandson of Wu Quanyou, the first teacher of Wu-style tai chi. Wu Kung-tsao was the younger brother of Wu Gongyi and the older brother of Wu Yinghua. The Wu family were originally of Manchu ancestry.

== Biography ==
As a young man, he studied tai chi, along with his brother, under the supervision of Yang Shaohou. There was a tradition in the Chinese martial arts of youngsters being taught by teachers of a generation older than their parents'. Since Wu Quanyou had died the same year Wu Kung-tsao was born, he and his brother were taught by Yang Shaohou, who was technically a generation senior to their father. Both Yang Shaohou and Wu Jianquan were famous for their "small circle" martial expertise. The motions of tai chi forms and pushing hands are all based on different sized circles, small circle movements in the forms and applications follow a more compact pathway for different leverage applications than larger circles.

In the 1920s, Wu Kung-tsao served first as an infantry officer in the Thirteenth Brigade of the Nationalist army until 1929, then later as a martial art instructor for the Hunan Martial Arts Training Centre as well as an instructor for the famous Ching Wu martial art school. During the 1930s, he wrote a well-known commentary on the classic writings in 40 chapters on tai chi that his grandfather had inherited from Yang Banhou. His commentary (including the original 40 chapters) was published as Wujia Taijiquan (Chinese: 吳家太極拳; lit. 'Wu-Family Tai Chi'), also known by English speakers as The Gold Book because of the colour of its cover. In 1937, he established his family's first school in Hong Kong. In addition to his teaching and literary contributions to the art, Wu Kung-tsao became known as a specialist in the neigong aspect of tai chi training, both for martial purposes and for therapeutic interventions along the lines of traditional Chinese medicine.

Wu Kung-tsao stayed on the mainland after the Chinese Communist Revolution in 1949. During and for a short time after the Cultural Revolution of 1966-1976 he was imprisoned by the Red Guards due to his history as a Nationalist military officer, a traditional Confucian scholar and Taoist teacher as well as a hostage to ensure the "good behaviour" of the rest of his family who were at the time living in Shanghai and Hong Kong. He was routinely tortured while a prisoner but was finally released in 1979, when he moved again to Hong Kong.

Wu Kung-tsao's second son Wu Daxin was also known as an expert martial artist and teacher who became the senior instructor of the Wu family schools internationally from 2001 until 2005.

== Generational senior instructors of the Wu family ==
1st Generation

Wu Quanyou (1834–1902), who learned from Yang Luchan and Yang Banhou, was senior instructor of the family from 1870-1902.

2nd generation

His oldest son, Wu Jianquan (1870–1942), was senior from 1902-1942.

3rd Generation

His oldest son, Wu Gongyi (1900–1970) was senior from 1942-1970.

Wu Gongyi's younger brother, Wu Kung-tsao (1903–1983), was senior in mainland from 1970-1983.

Wu Gongyi's younger sister, Wu Yinghua (1907–1997), was senior in mainland from 1983-1997.

4th Generation Wu Gongyi's eldest son, Wu Tai Kwai (1923-1972) was senior in Hong Kong and overseas from 1970-1972

Wu Gongyi's second son, Wu Tai Chai (1926-1993) was senior in Hong Kong and overseas from 1972-1993

Wu Gongyi's daughter, Wu Yanxia (1930–2001) was senior in Hong Kong and overseas from 1997-2001.

Wu Kung-tsao's son, Wu Daxin (1933–2005), was senior in Hong Kong and overseas from 2001-2005.

5th Generation

The current senior instructor of the Wu family is Wu Ta-Kwai's son Wu Kwong-yu ("Eddie Wu", born 1946).

Note: the above names of those who lived in Hong Kong have official English names in their legal document as above, and they followed the official dialect in Hong Kong, Cantonese, they are not same as those in pinyin system of putonghua. eg, you have Bruce Lee Siu Lung, and NOT Bruce Li Xiaolong.

The corresponding table is Wu Gongyi = officially NG KUNG YI Wu Gongzao, officially NG KUNG CHO (when he stayed in Hong Kong) Wu Dakui, officially NG TAI KWAI Wu Dacai NG TAI CHAI Wu Daxin NG TAI SUN Wu Yanxia NG NGAN HA

Note there was a period before mainland open up, there were time when both mainland and HK+overseas operate independently.

== Tai chi lineage tree with Wu-style focus ==
Note:

- This lineage tree is not comprehensive, but depicts those considered the 'gate-keepers' & most recognized individuals in each generation of Wu-style.
- Although many styles were passed down to respective descendants of the same family, the lineage focused on is that of the Wu style & not necessarily that of the family.

Key:	NEIJIA
Solid lines	Direct teacher-student.
Dot lines	Partial influence /taught informally /limited time.	TAI CHI
Dash lines	Individual(s) omitted.
Dash cross	Branch continues.	CHEN-STYLE	Zhaobao-style
YANG-STYLE
(王蘭亭); Wang Lanting; 1840–? 2nd gen. Yang	Yang Jianhou; 1839–1917; 2nd gen. Yang; 2nd gen. Yangjia Michuan	Yang Banhou; 1837–1892; 2nd gen. Yang; 2nd gen. Guang Ping Yang; Yang Small Frame	WU (HAO)-STYLE	Zhaobao He-style
Li-style	Yang Shao-hou; 1862–1930; 3rd gen. Yang; Yang Small Frame	Wu Quanyou; 1834–1902; 1st gen. Wu
(齊閣臣); Qi Gechen; 2nd gen. Wu	(夏公甫); Xia Gongfu; 2nd gen. Wu	Wu Jianquan; 1870–1942; 2nd gen. Wu; WU-STYLE; 108 Form	(常遠亭); Chang Yuanting; 1860–1918; 2nd gen. Wu	(郭松亭); Guo Songting; 2nd gen. Wu	Wang Maozhai; 1862–1940; 2nd gen. Wu	SUN-STYLE
Dong Yingjie; 1891–1960; 4th gen. Yang	(齊敏軒); Qi Minxuan; 3rd gen. Wu	Cheng Wing Kwong; 1903–1967; 3rd gen. Wu	Wu Yinghua; 1907–1997; 3rd gen. Wu	Wu Gongyi; 1900–1970; 3rd gen. Wu	Wu Kung-tsao; 1903–1983; 3rd gen. Wu	Ma Yueliang; 1901–1998; 3rd gen. Wu	Yang Yuting; 1887–1982; 3rd gen. Wu
(鄭天熊); Cheng Tin Hung; 1930–2005; Wudang-style	Wu Ta-k'uei; 1923–1972; 4th gen. Wu	Wu Yanxia; 1930–2001; 4th gen. Wu	Wu Daxin; 1933–2005; 4th gen. Wu	(立群); Li Liqun; 1924–2013; 4th gen. Wu	Wang Peisheng; 1919–2004; 4th gen. Wu
Wu Kuang-yu; 1946–Present; 5th gen. Wu	(骆舒焕); Luo Shuhuan; 1935–1987; 5th gen. Wu
CHEN-STYLE	YANG-STYLE	WU-STYLE	SUN-STYLE	WU (HAO)-STYLE
