= Wu Quanyou =

Chinese tai chi teacher (1834–1902)

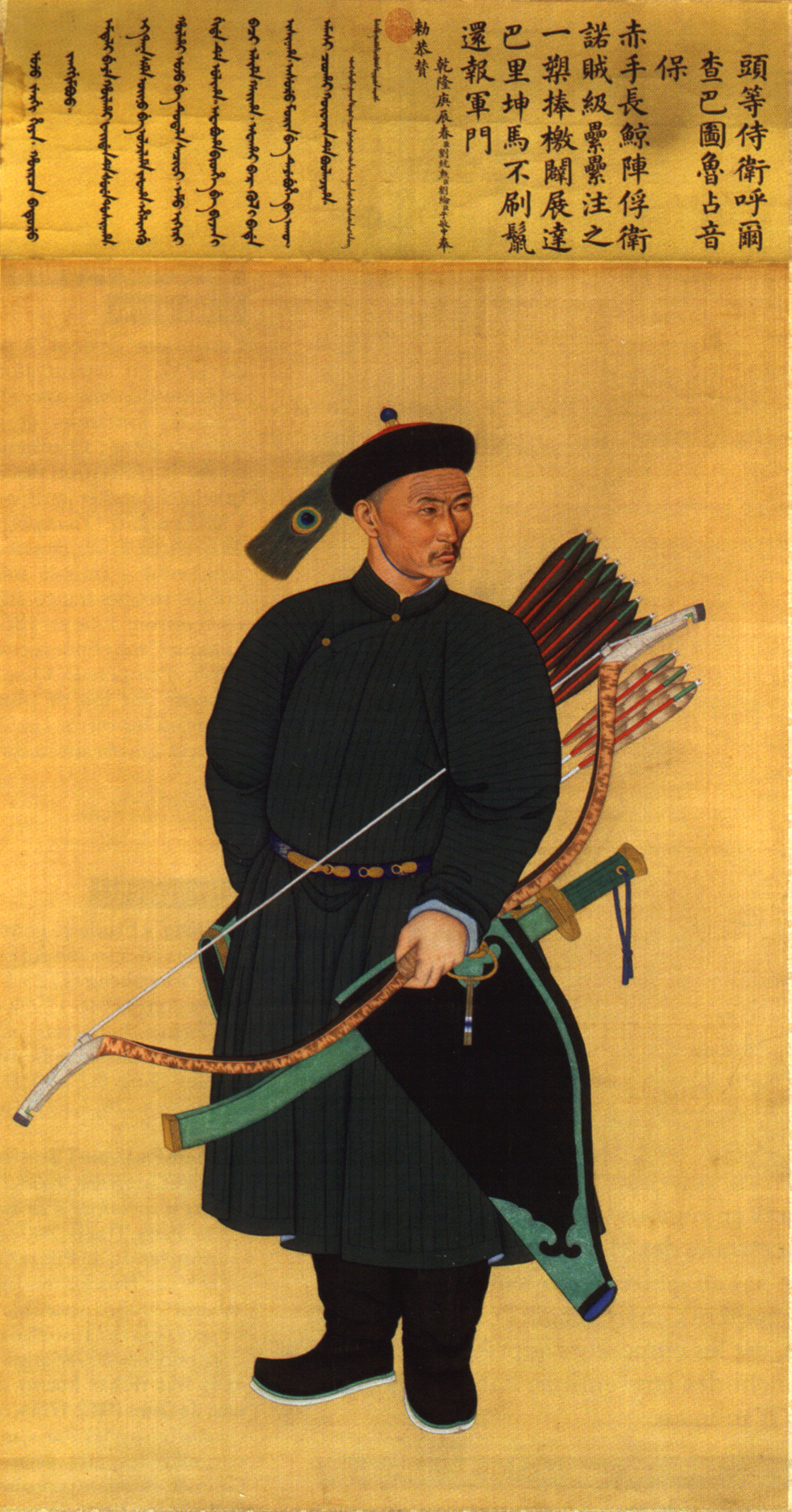
- Born: 吴全佑; 1834; China
- Died: 1902 (aged 67–68)
- Nationality: Chinese
- Style: Wu-style tai chi

Other information
- Notable students: Wu Jianquan; Wang Maozhai; Guo Songting (郭松亭); Chang Yuanting (常遠亭); Xia Gongfu (夏公甫); Qi Gechen (齊閣臣)

Wu Quanyou
- Traditional Chinese: 吳全佑
- Simplified Chinese: 吴全佑
Transcriptions
Standard Mandarin
- Hanyu Pinyin: Wú Quányòu

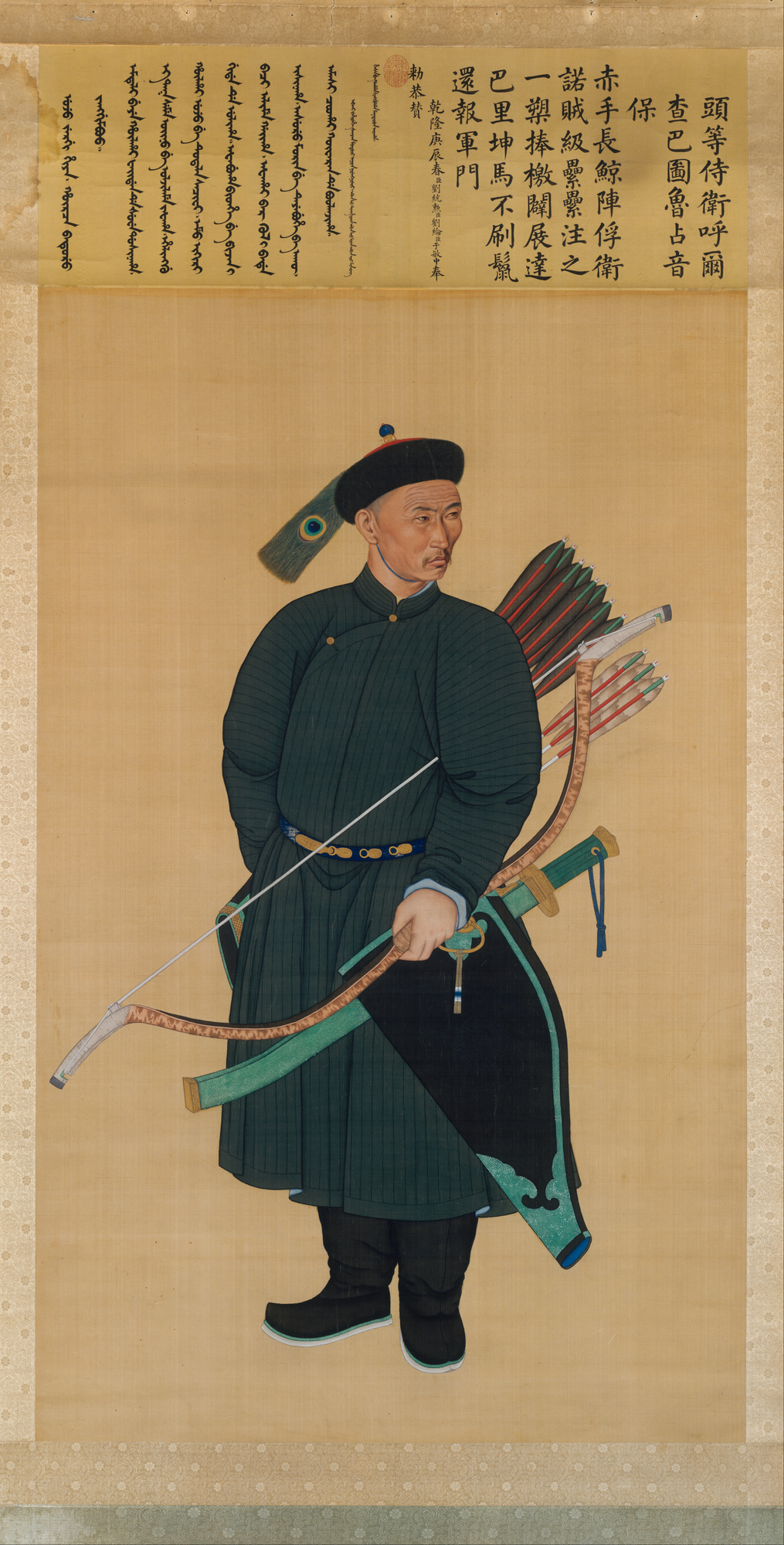
Depiction of a Manchu Imperial Guards Bannerman wearing similar uniform and gear to that worn by Wu Quanyou as a military officer

Wu Quanyou (Chinese: 吴全佑; Wade–Giles: Wu Ch‘üan-yu; 1834–1902) was an influential teacher of the tai chi martial art in late Imperial China. His son is credited as the founder of the Wu-style tai chi. As he was of Manchu descent, and would have been named by his family in Manchu, the name "Wú" (吳) was a sinicisation that approximated the pronunciation of the first syllable of his Manchu clan name, U Hala.

== Life ==
Wu Quanyou was a military officer in the Yellow Banner camp in the Forbidden City, Beijing and also an officer of the Imperial Guards Brigade during the Qing dynasty. Wu wished to study under Yang Luchan, the tai chi instructor for that banner camp, but he was still a middle grade officer and Yang refused to teach him. Instead, Wu and two other officers, Wan Chun (萬春) and Ling Shan (凌山), were asked to become disciples of Yang Banhou, Yang Luchan's oldest adult son and also a tai chi instructor for the Qing military.

When Wu retired from the military, he set up a school in Beijing. Wu's Beijing school was successful and there were many who studied with him, he was popularly known as Quan Sanye (全三爺) as a term of respect. His disciples included Wang Maozhai, Guo Songting (郭松亭), Xia Gongfu (夏公甫), Chang Yuanting (1860–1918; 常遠亭), Qi Gechen (齊閣臣), and Wu's own son, Wu Jianquan (see Wudang tai chi lineage). Wu's skills were said to be exceptional in the area of softly "neutralising" (化勁; huà jìn) hard energy when attacked, which is a core skill of good tai chi. Chang Yuanting's son Chang Yunji taught a style known as "Quanyou laojia tai chi" (全佑老架太极拳) or "Chang-style tai chi" (常氏太極拳).

Wu's son, Wu Jianquan also became a cavalry officer and tai chi teacher, working closely with the Yang family and Sun Lutang, promoting what subsequently came to be known as Wu-style tai chi in Beijing, Shanghai, and Hong Kong.

== Tai chi lineage tree with Wu-style focus ==
Note:

- This lineage tree is not comprehensive, but depicts those considered the 'gate-keepers' & most recognized individuals in each generation of Wu-style.
- Although many styles were passed down to respective descendants of the same family, the lineage focused on is that of the Wu style & not necessarily that of the family.

Key:	NEIJIA
Solid lines	Direct teacher-student.
Dot lines	Partial influence /taught informally /limited time.	TAI CHI
Dash lines	Individual(s) omitted.
Dash cross	Branch continues.	CHEN-STYLE	Zhaobao-style
YANG-STYLE
(王蘭亭); Wang Lanting; 1840–? 2nd gen. Yang	Yang Jianhou; 1839–1917; 2nd gen. Yang; 2nd gen. Yangjia Michuan	Yang Banhou; 1837–1892; 2nd gen. Yang; 2nd gen. Guang Ping Yang; Yang Small Frame	WU (HAO)-STYLE	Zhaobao He-style
Li-style	Yang Shao-hou; 1862–1930; 3rd gen. Yang; Yang Small Frame	Wu Quanyou; 1834–1902; 1st gen. Wu
(齊閣臣); Qi Gechen; 2nd gen. Wu	(夏公甫); Xia Gongfu; 2nd gen. Wu	Wu Jianquan; 1870–1942; 2nd gen. Wu; WU-STYLE; 108 Form	(常遠亭); Chang Yuanting; 1860–1918; 2nd gen. Wu	(郭松亭); Guo Songting; 2nd gen. Wu	Wang Maozhai; 1862–1940; 2nd gen. Wu	SUN-STYLE
Dong Yingjie; 1891–1960; 4th gen. Yang	(齊敏軒); Qi Minxuan; 3rd gen. Wu	Cheng Wing Kwong; 1903–1967; 3rd gen. Wu	Wu Yinghua; 1907–1997; 3rd gen. Wu	Wu Gongyi; 1900–1970; 3rd gen. Wu	Wu Kung-tsao; 1903–1983; 3rd gen. Wu	Ma Yueliang; 1901–1998; 3rd gen. Wu	Yang Yuting; 1887–1982; 3rd gen. Wu
(鄭天熊); Cheng Tin Hung; 1930–2005; Wudang-style	Wu Ta-k'uei; 1923–1972; 4th gen. Wu	Wu Yanxia; 1930–2001; 4th gen. Wu	Wu Daxin; 1933–2005; 4th gen. Wu	(立群); Li Liqun; 1924–2013; 4th gen. Wu	Wang Peisheng; 1919–2004; 4th gen. Wu
Wu Kuang-yu; 1946–Present; 5th gen. Wu	(骆舒焕); Luo Shuhuan; 1935–1987; 5th gen. Wu
CHEN-STYLE	YANG-STYLE	WU-STYLE	SUN-STYLE	WU (HAO)-STYLE

== See also ==
- Wu Yinghua
- Ma Yueliang
- Ma Jiangbao, son of Wu Yinghua and Ma Yueliang
- Wu Daqi
- Wu Daxin
