= Wu Daqi =

Chinese martial artist

吴大齐 Wu Daqi
- Born: 1926; China
- Died: 1993 (aged 66–67)
- Nationality: Chinese
- Style: Wu-style tai chi

Other information
- Notable students: Chu Weng-Moon

Wu Daqi
- Traditional Chinese: 吳大齊
- Simplified Chinese: 吴大齐
Transcriptions
Standard Mandarin
- Hanyu Pinyin: Wú Dàqí

Wu Daqi or Wu Ta-ch'i (1926–1993) was the descendant of the famous Wu-style tai chi founders Wu Quanyou (1834–1902) and Wu Jianquan (1870–1942). He directed Wu-style tai chi instruction outside of Mainland China after the death of his father Wu Gongyi (1900–1970) and brother Wu Ta-kuei (1923–1972) from the Wu-style tai chi headquarters in Hong Kong internationally.

== Biography ==
Born in China to a distinguished martial arts family, Wu Daqi, with his brother Wu Ta-kuei, sister Wu Yanxia and his first cousin Wu Daxin, endured strict training from their nationally famous grandfather and father. Being the grandchildren of the family, they were traditionally expected to inherit the family art of tai chi that their great-grandfather Wu Quanyou had first learned from Yang Luchan (1799–1872) and his son Yang Banhou (1837–1890).

When Wu Gongyi migrated with his family to Hong Kong in the 1940s, Wu Daqi assisted his father in the propagation and teaching of tai chi. During the 1950s under the instructions of Wu Gongyi, Wu Daqi and his cousin Wu Daxin (1933–2005) travelled extensively to Malaysia and Singapore to start and support academies promoting Wu-style tai chi. Their efforts met with success, making the region a key centre of Wu-style tai chi outside of Hong Kong and China. Wu Daqi's chief disciple Chu Weng-Moon in Malaysia and his fellow disciples continue to teach Wu-style tai chi.

In 1974, Wu Daqi was invited by the Chinese Canadian Kuo Shu Federation to teach in Toronto, Ontario, Canada where he established the first Wu family school outside of Asia. The Canadian school founded by Wu Daqi was entrusted to his nephew Wu Kuang-yu (Eddie Wu) in 1976.

Wu Daqi was a member of the advisory board of the Martial Art Association in Hong Kong.
