= Wu Jianquan =

Chinese martial artist (1870-1942)

- Born: 吴鉴泉; 12/26/1870; China
- Died: 1942
- Style: Wu-style tai chi

Other information
- Notable students: Wu Gongyi; Wu Gongzao; Wu Yinghua; Ma Yueliang; Cheng Wing Kwong

Wu Jianquan
- Traditional Chinese: 吳鑑泉
- Simplified Chinese: 吴鉴泉
Transcriptions
Standard Mandarin
- Hanyu Pinyin: Wú Jiànquán
- Wade–Giles: Wu^{2} Chien^{4} ch'üan^{2}
Yue: Cantonese
- Yale Romanization: Ng4 Gaam3 Chyun4

Wu Jianquan (Chinese: 吴鉴泉; pinyin: Wú Jiànquán; Wade–Giles: Wu Chien-ch‘üan; 1870-1942) was a famous teacher and founder of the neijia martial art of Wu-style tai chi in late Imperial and early Republican China.

== Biography ==
Wu Jianquan was taught martial arts by his father, Wu Quanyou, a senior student of Yang Luchan, and Yang Banhou. Both Wu Jianquan and his father were hereditary Manchu cavalry officers of the Yellow Banner as well as the Imperial Guards Brigade, yet the Wu family were to become patriotic supporters of Sun Yat-sen.

At the time of the establishment of the Chinese Republic in 1912, China was in turmoil, besieged for many years economically and even militarily by several foreign powers, so Wu Jianquan and his colleagues Yang Shaohou, Yang Chengfu and Sun Lutang promoted the benefits of tai chi training on a national scale. They subsequently offered classes at the Beijing Physical Culture Research Institute to as many people as possible, starting in 1914. It was the first school to provide instruction in the art to the general public. Wu Jianquan was also asked to teach the Eleventh Corps of the new Presidential Bodyguard as well as at the nationally famous Ching Wu martial arts school.

As the focus of tai chi teaching in his time changed from a strictly military art to a discipline made available to the general public, Wu Jianquan modified somewhat the teaching forms he had learned from his father. Wu Jianquan's changes to the initial forms shown to his students included smoothing overt expressions of fa jin, jumps and other abrupt time changes in the training routines in order to make those forms easier for the general public to learn. These modified elements were preserved and taught in various advanced forms and pushing hands, however.

Wu Jianquan moved his family to Shanghai in 1928. In 1935, he established the Jianquan Taijiquan Association on the ninth floor of the Shanghai YMCA to promote and teach tai chi. What he taught has since become known as Wu-style tai chi and is one of the five primary styles practised around the world.

Jianquan Taijiquan Association schools have subsequently been maintained by Wu's descendants. He was succeeded as head of the Wu family system by his oldest son, Wu Gongyi, in 1942. His second son, Wu Kung-tsao, also became a renowned tai chi master. Wu Gongyi moved the family headquarters to the Hong Kong school (established in 1937) in 1949. Today the Association still has its international headquarters in Hong Kong and is currently managed by Wu's great-grandson, Wu Kuang-yu, with branches in Shanghai, Singapore, Canada, the United States, the United Kingdom, Greece, Tahiti, and France. Several of Wu's disciples also became well known tai chi teachers. Prominent in that number were the senior disciple, Ma Yueliang, Wu Tunan and Cheng Wing Kwong. His daughter Wu Yinghua and her husband Ma Yueliang continued running the Shanghai Jianquan Taijiquan Association until their deaths in the mid 1990s.

== Tai chi lineage tree with Wu-style focus ==
Note:

- This lineage tree is not comprehensive, but depicts those considered the 'gate-keepers' & most recognized individuals in each generation of Wu-style.
- Although many styles were passed down to respective descendants of the same family, the lineage focused on is that of the Wu style & not necessarily that of the family.

Key: | NEIJIA
Solid lines | Direct teacher-student.
Dot lines | Partial influence /taught informally /limited time. | TAI CHI
Dash lines | Individual(s) omitted.
Dash cross | Branch continues. | CHEN-STYLE | Zhaobao-style
YANG-STYLE
(王蘭亭); Wang Lanting; 1840–? 2nd gen. Yang | Yang Jianhou; 1839–1917; 2nd gen. Yang; 2nd gen. Yangjia Michuan | Yang Banhou; 1837–1892; 2nd gen. Yang; 2nd gen. Guang Ping Yang; Yang Small Frame | WU (HAO)-STYLE | Zhaobao He-style
Li-style | Yang Shao-hou; 1862–1930; 3rd gen. Yang; Yang Small Frame | Wu Quanyou; 1834–1902; 1st gen. Wu
(齊閣臣); Qi Gechen; 2nd gen. Wu | (夏公甫); Xia Gongfu; 2nd gen. Wu | Wu Jianquan; 1870–1942; 2nd gen. Wu; WU-STYLE; 108 Form | (常遠亭); Chang Yuanting; 1860–1918; 2nd gen. Wu | (郭松亭); Guo Songting; 2nd gen. Wu | Wang Maozhai; 1862–1940; 2nd gen. Wu | SUN-STYLE
Dong Yingjie; 1891–1960; 4th gen. Yang | (齊敏軒); Qi Minxuan; 3rd gen. Wu | Cheng Wing Kwong; 1903–1967; 3rd gen. Wu | Wu Yinghua; 1907–1997; 3rd gen. Wu | Wu Gongyi; 1900–1970; 3rd gen. Wu | Wu Kung-tsao; 1903–1983; 3rd gen. Wu | Ma Yueliang; 1901–1998; 3rd gen. Wu | Yang Yuting; 1887–1982; 3rd gen. Wu
(鄭天熊); Cheng Tin Hung; 1930–2005; Wudang-style | Wu Ta-k'uei; 1923–1972; 4th gen. Wu | Wu Yanxia; 1930–2001; 4th gen. Wu | Wu Daxin; 1933–2005; 4th gen. Wu | (立群); Li Liqun; 1924–2013; 4th gen. Wu | Wang Peisheng; 1919–2004; 4th gen. Wu
Wu Kuang-yu; 1946–Present; 5th gen. Wu | (骆舒焕); Luo Shuhuan; 1935–1987; 5th gen. Wu
CHEN-STYLE | YANG-STYLE | WU-STYLE | SUN-STYLE | WU (HAO)-STYLE
