= Wu Gongyi =

Wu Gongyi 吳公儀
- Born: 1898; Beijing, China
- Died: 1970 (aged 71–72); British Hong Kong
- Nationality: Chinese
- Style: Wu-style tai chi

Other information
- Notable students: Wu Daxin; Wu Ta-k'uei; Wu Daqi; Wu Yanxia

Wu Gongyi
- Traditional Chinese: 吳公儀
Transcriptions
Standard Mandarin
- Hanyu Pinyin: Wú Gōngyí
- Wade–Giles: Wu^{2} Kung^{1}-i^{2}
Yue: Cantonese
- Yale Romanization: Ng4 Gung1 Yi4

Wu Gongyi (Chinese: 吳公儀; pinyin: Wú Gōngyí; Wade–Giles: Wu Kung-i; 1898–1970) was a well-known teacher of the soft style martial art tai chi in China, and, after 1949, in British Hong Kong. He was also the "gate-keeper" of the Wu family from 1942 until his death in 1970.

== Biography ==
Wu Gongyi was the grandson of the founder of Wu-style tai chi, Wu Quanyou. Wu Quanyou's son, Wu Jianquan, became the best known teacher in his family, and is therefore also considered the co-founder of the Wu-style. Wu Gongyi was his eldest son. Wu Gongyi's younger brother and sister, Wu Kung-tsao and Wu Yinghua, were also well-known teachers of Wu-style. The Wu family were originally of Manchu ancestry.

There was a tradition in the Chinese martial arts that youngsters be taught by teachers of a generation older than their parents'. Since Wu Quanyou had died while Wu Gongyi was an infant, he and his brother were taught as young men by Yang Shaohou, who was technically a generation senior to their father. Both Yang Shaohou and Wu Jianquan were famous for their "small circle" martial expertise. The motions of tai chi forms and pushing hands are all based on different sized circles, small circle movements in the forms and applications follow a more compact pathway for different leverage applications than larger circles.

After the fall of the Qing dynasty in 1912, a new teaching environment was created. More people became aware of tai chi, and the former dynamic of small classes and intensive military instruction of relatively young students became less practical. Wu Gongyi responded to the new demands of larger class sizes and older beginning level students by changing some aspects of the beginning level hand forms he taught. His modifications of the "square" forms he had learned from his father and the slightly different form he learned from Yang Shaohou, distinguished by clear sectional instructions for each move in the form sequence, more compact "small circle" movements in the body and somewhat higher stances with the feet relatively closer together than in other styles of tai chi. Wu Gongyi also formulated new styles of pushing hands based on smaller circles, most notably the "four corner" method of basic pushing hands.

Wu Gongyi's children were also full-time tai chi teachers; his oldest son Wu Ta-k'uei, his second son, Wu Daqi and his daughter, Wu Yanxia.

In 1953, the nearly fifty-five-year-old Wu was publicly challenged to a fight by the thirty-something Tibetan White Crane stylist Chan Hak-fu (陈克夫). The contest was arranged and fought in Macau in January, 1954. The ring was set up as if for a Western boxing match, and there were many rules prohibiting various techniques being used by the fighters; kicks, throws or joint locks, for example. The contest lasted not quite two rounds. During the second round, the judges ended the fight, declaring the contest a draw. This was done to ensure that there was no loss of face to either party. Both Wu and Chen invited the opposing sides to celebratory banquets. The contest was reported in detail by the media of the day, and resulted in many new students for the Wu family school, including a martial art teaching contract for Wu Ta-k'uei from the Kowloon police.

== Tai chi lineage tree with Wu-style focus ==
Note:

- This lineage tree is not comprehensive, but depicts those considered the 'gate-keepers' & most recognized individuals in each generation of Wu-style.
- Although many styles were passed down to respective descendants of the same family, the lineage focused on is that of the Wu style & not necessarily that of the family.

Key:	NEIJIA
Solid lines	Direct teacher-student.
Dot lines	Partial influence /taught informally /limited time.	TAI CHI
Dash lines	Individual(s) omitted.
Dash cross	Branch continues.	CHEN-STYLE	Zhaobao-style
YANG-STYLE
(王蘭亭); Wang Lanting; 1840–? 2nd gen. Yang	Yang Jianhou; 1839–1917; 2nd gen. Yang; 2nd gen. Yangjia Michuan	Yang Banhou; 1837–1892; 2nd gen. Yang; 2nd gen. Guang Ping Yang; Yang Small Frame	WU (HAO)-STYLE	Zhaobao He-style
Li-style	Yang Shao-hou; 1862–1930; 3rd gen. Yang; Yang Small Frame	Wu Quanyou; 1834–1902; 1st gen. Wu
(齊閣臣); Qi Gechen; 2nd gen. Wu	(夏公甫); Xia Gongfu; 2nd gen. Wu	Wu Jianquan; 1870–1942; 2nd gen. Wu; WU-STYLE; 108 Form	(常遠亭); Chang Yuanting; 1860–1918; 2nd gen. Wu	(郭松亭); Guo Songting; 2nd gen. Wu	Wang Maozhai; 1862–1940; 2nd gen. Wu	SUN-STYLE
Dong Yingjie; 1891–1960; 4th gen. Yang	(齊敏軒); Qi Minxuan; 3rd gen. Wu	Cheng Wing Kwong; 1903–1967; 3rd gen. Wu	Wu Yinghua; 1907–1997; 3rd gen. Wu	Wu Gongyi; 1900–1970; 3rd gen. Wu	Wu Kung-tsao; 1903–1983; 3rd gen. Wu	Ma Yueliang; 1901–1998; 3rd gen. Wu	Yang Yuting; 1887–1982; 3rd gen. Wu
(鄭天熊); Cheng Tin Hung; 1930–2005; Wudang-style	Wu Ta-k'uei; 1923–1972; 4th gen. Wu	Wu Yanxia; 1930–2001; 4th gen. Wu	Wu Daxin; 1933–2005; 4th gen. Wu	(立群); Li Liqun; 1924–2013; 4th gen. Wu	Wang Peisheng; 1919–2004; 4th gen. Wu
Wu Kuang-yu; 1946–Present; 5th gen. Wu	(骆舒焕); Luo Shuhuan; 1935–1987; 5th gen. Wu
CHEN-STYLE	YANG-STYLE	WU-STYLE	SUN-STYLE	WU (HAO)-STYLE
