= Yang Yuting =

Yang Yuting may refer to:

- Yang Yuting (warlord) (1886–1929), Chinese warlord of the Fengtian clique
- Yang Yuting (martial artist) (1887–1982), Chinese teacher of Wu-style tai chi
