= Jianquan Taijiquan Association =

- Traditional Chinese: 鑑泉太極拳社
Transcriptions
Standard Mandarin
- Hanyu Pinyin: Jiànquán tàijíquán shè
- Wade–Giles: Chien^{4}-ch'üan^{2} t'ai^{4} chi^{2} ch'üan^{2} she^{4}
Yue: Cantonese
- Yale Romanization: Gaam3 Chyun4 taai3 gik6 kyun4 se5

The Jianquan Taijiquan Association (Chinese: 鑑泉太極拳社) is a well known school teaching Wu-style tai chi.

It was founded in 1935 by Wu Jianquan in Shanghai, and in the beginning operated out of the Shanghai YMCA. In 1937 Wu Kung-tsao opened a school in the British colony of Hong Kong during the Second Sino-Japanese War (1937–1945) in response to the ban on Chinese martial arts instituted by the Japanese. In 1942, when Wu Jianquan died, his oldest son Wu Gongyi became head of the Association, eventually moving its headquarters to the Hong Kong school where it has continued uninterrupted to this day. In English the Hong Kong branch and its subsidiaries call themselves "Wu's T'ai Chi Ch'uan Academies."

Wu Jianquan's daughter Wu Yinghua and his eldest disciple Ma Yueliang led the branch in Shanghai after 1949. The Shanghai school fell under the ban on "feudalistic practices" with the beginning of the Cultural Revolution.

Only in 1980 were they able to officially reopen, with Wu Yinghua as president and Ma Yueliang as vice president. Ma Hailong, son of Wu Yinghua and Ma Yueliang, succeeded as president in 1998, following the deaths of both his parents. In 2019, his son Ma Wenzhao succeeded him as president; Ma Hailong died in 2022. As of 2023, Ma Wenzhao continues to serve as president.

== Bibliography ==
- Wu Kung-tsao. Wu Family Tai Chi (吳家太極拳), Hong Kong, 1980, Toronto 2006, ISBN 0-9780499-0-X
- Journal of Asian Martial Arts Volume 15, No. 1, 2006. Via Media Publishing, Erie Pennsylvania USA. ISSN 1057-8358
- Frank, Adam Dean (2003). Taijiquan and the Search for the Little Old Chinese Man: Ritualizing Race through Martial Arts (PhD dissertation). The University of Texas at Austin.
