= Dong Yingjie =

Chinese martial artist (1897 - 1961)

Dong Yingjie 董英傑
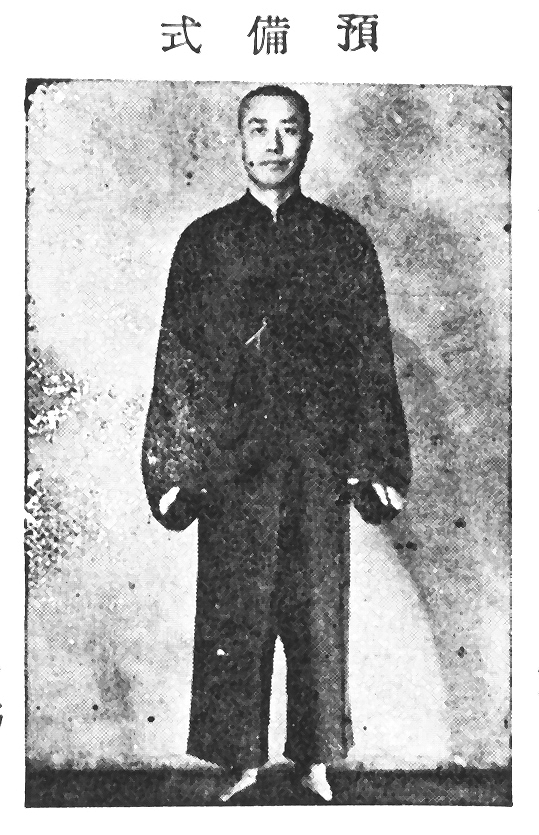
- Dong Yingjie in "Preparatory Posture" from his book Tai Chi Boxing Explained
- Born: 董文科 (Pinyin: Dǒng Wénkē); November 8, 1897; Renze (then known as Renxian), Xingtai, Hebei, China
- Died: 1961 (aged 63–64); Hong Kong
- Other names: Tung Ying Kit
- Nationality: Chinese
- Style: Yang-style tai chi Wu (Hao)-style tai chi Dong-style tai chi

Other information
- Notable students: Tung Hu Ling (Dong Huling)

Dong Yingjie
- Traditional Chinese: 董英傑
- Simplified Chinese: 董英杰
Transcriptions
Standard Mandarin
- Hanyu Pinyin: Dǒng Yīngjié
- Wade–Giles: Tung3 Ying1-chieh2
Yue: Cantonese
- Jyutping: dung2 ying1 git6

Dong Yingjie (Wade-Giles: Tung Ying-chieh, Chinese: 董英傑, 1897 - 1961) was a leading master of tai chi, and a top disciple of Yang Chengfu. Born in Renze (then known as Renxian), Xingtai, Hebei, China, his given name was Wenke (文科). Famous in his time for defeating a foreign boxer in a public challenge match, he dedicated his life to the martial arts, training intensively in multiple styles, serving as chief assistant instructor for Yang Chengfu, and going on to found his own thriving tai chi legacy.

== Early life ==
He was born to a prosperous farming family, and as a child was very studious but frail. Avidly interested in martial arts even then, at age 12 he convinced his grandfather to send him away to learn from security professional and martial arts master Liu Yingzhou (劉瀛洲), also known as Liu Laoying (劉老瀛). There he trained in San Huang Pao Chui and other Shaolin styles. Liu also taught him some tai chi.

After five years he returned home to marry and join the family business, but soon sought out Liu Laoying again to resume training. Liu recommended deeper study of tai chi, and through Liu's relationship with Yang Zhaolin (楊兆林, 1884–1922), the eldest grandson of Yang Luchan, Dong studied Yang-style tai chi under Li Zengkui (李增魁). Dong was impressed with Li's pushing hands skills, but at that time Dong's expertise in external martial arts — on which he relied in those years to deal with bandits and other conflicts — remained superior to his understanding of tai chi. (Note: Yang Zhaolin demonstrated a Yang Banhou form for Dong, but at the time was too ill with tuberculosis to teach.)

Dong achieved a high level of skill in tai chi after Liu introduced him to Li Baoyu (李寶玉, 1889–1961), who was known by the courtesy name Li Xiangyuan (李香遠). Li had mastered Wu (Hao)-style tai chi under Hao Weizhen, and was famous for defeating all challengers in and out of the ring, including some local gangsters. For three years, Dong lived with Li, worked for him in his business, and trained intensively in Wu (Hao) style and Li's advanced techniques. From that time onwards, Li became a lifelong coach, mentor, and friend. (Note: Li Baoyu had also been a disciple of Liu Yingzhou, training in San Huang Pao Chui from age 14. Later Liu also introduced him to Yang Zhaolin for training in Yang Banhou tai chi. He then became a disciple of another friend of Liu's, Wu (Hao) master Hao Weizhen. When Dong first trained with him in Hebei, Li had a business there unrelated to martial arts. But after Li visited Dong in Suzhou and coached Dong through the famous Nanjing match, he began teaching Wu (Hao) style in Suzhou, Hangzhou, Nanjing, Hebei, and elsewhere, earning the nickname "Spirit Hand (神手) Li". In 1977 Li's disciple Ou-Yang Fang (歐陽方) represented the Wu (Hao) style in an official government film of the major tai chi styles, performing the old form of Hao Weizhen that the Dong family still teaches today.)

== Career ==
=== Mastery ===
In 1926, Dong moved to Beijing seeking instruction from Grandmaster Yang Chengfu in Yang-style tai chi. He quickly mastered Yang Chengfu's "large frame" techniques, and served as chief assistant instructor for much of the last 10 years of Yang's life.

While in Beijing he also trained under Yang's older brother Yang Shaohou in "small frame" Yang-style tai chi, and practiced push hands with Chen-style master Chen Fake. Also training with Yang Shaohou were Dong's future lifelong colleagues, the Wu-style masters Wu Gongyi and Wu Kung-tsao.

A few years later he resumed training with Li Baoyu to master the Wu (Hao) style as well, and so the Dong family trace their tai chi lineage through both Yang and Wu (Hao).

=== Jianghu journeys ===
In 1928 Dong moved south with a group led by Yang Chengfu to establish tai chi schools in other cities. Later that year he proved his pushing hands prowess and confirmed the reputations of his teachers by defeating all nine challengers at the Hangzhou Guoshu Arena Competition (杭州國術擂台賽). He also demonstrated Yang-style forms at major Guoshu events for audiences that included martial arts celebrities and government officials, for example in Shanghai in 1928 and at the West Lake Expo Auditorium (西湖博覽會大禮堂) in 1929.

He was the principal contributor to Yang's 1931 book Methods of Applying Tai Chi Boxing (太極拳使用法), and helped establish Yang-style tai chi schools and classes in Hangzhou, Nanjing and other cities, including Suzhou where he lived and led classes in the mansion of a wealthy patron during his first years in the region, Shanghai where in 1934 he established and managed all business of the center as director as well as instructor, and Guangzhou where he assisted and then took over when Yang returned north in 1935.

In 1936 he volunteered to travel across China with a group of experts to train and inspire troops preparing to fight the Japanese invaders. Dong Yingjie's participation was valuable not only for his fighting skills. He was also an inspiration, having by that point risen to national fame after becoming known as "Yingjie", following his fight against another type of foreign aggression.

=== Yingjie ===
He earned the name Yingjie, which can be translated as "heroic figure", in his early thirties by defeating a British fighter in a brutal public match in Nanjing. Dong defended the honor of tai chi and all Chinese martial arts, and bolstered Chinese national pride after the foreigner had issued insulting racial taunts and had already defeated several other Chinese martial artists.

Li Baoyu coached Dong for that competition, after planning to take the challenger on himself but then dropping out because, as the story goes, a local gangster hired by the British deputy consul threw lime powder in Li's eyes which temporarily blinded him. After the fight, Dong threw his winner's jackpot of silver coins into the crowd, asking the audience to cover transportation home for other Chinese martial artists who had competed.

Nationalism had been stoked on both sides in no small part because his opponent was sponsored by the British deputy consul. As word of Dong's win and generosity spread across the country, he was hailed as a hero of the Chinese people. And so from that time on, Dong Wenke was known only as Dong Yingjie.

=== Ying-kit ===
In 1936 after Yang Chengfu died, Dong Yingjie was invited to teach in Hong Kong, where he founded the Tung Ying Kit Tai Chi Chuan Gymnasium — "kit" (Jyutping: git6) is the Cantonese pronunciation of "jie" (傑, Pinyin: jié) — and became the first to teach Yang-style tai chi in the colony. In 1939 he was also invited to teach in Macau, where he established another successful school. From 1941 to 1945 during the Japanese occupation of Hong Kong, he relocated to Macau which as a Portuguese colony was neutral territory, where he continued his anti-Japanese resistance activities while also developing a new tai chi fast form, leading tai chi classes, and taking up traditional Chinese painting and calligraphy.

After the war he returned to Hong Kong, enlisting his children in growing both schools, and in 1948 published 太極拳釋義 (The Meaning and Significance of Taijiquan Practice, also translated Tai Chi Boxing Explained) which illustrated and explained the Yang-style curriculum and introduced his Yingjie Fast Form (英傑快拳 — see the section on the Dong family forms below). Also known as the "Red Book" due to the cover of the Hong Kong edition, it has been reprinted many times, and in 1972 his eldest son Tung Hu Ling (Dong Huling; 董虎嶺) expanded the section on the Yingjie Fast Form. (Note: The "Red Book" nickname is not unusual. Prominent Wu-style masters of the same era produced important works often referred to by their cover colors: the "Orange Book" by Wu Yinghua and Ma Yueliang, and the "Gold Book" by Wu Kung-tsao. (Other than this broad cultural context, these names have nothing to do with Mao Zedong's "Little Red Book", which was published many years later in 1964.))

In the 1950s his network of schools and students expanded to Thailand, Singapore, and Malaysia under the management of his son Tung Hu Ling, their success in Southeast Asia ensured after a few Muay Thai boxers famously challenged and failed to defeat their tai chi. Dong Yingjie also led efforts to coordinate with leading Yang and Wu (吳, Pinyin: Wú) stylists for the promotion of tai chi, organizing a large gathering of practitioners in Hong Kong, and serving as a judge for a wildly popular public match in Macau between his longtime colleague, Wu-style tai chi master Wu Gongyi, and a master of Tibetan White Crane. At that 1954 fight, Dong was filmed demonstrating techniques with an Eagle Claw master, and performing his Yingjie Fast Form.

== Final years ==
In his final years Dong Yingjie lost weight and strength, but it is clear in films of him performing tai chi that he retained his balance, grace, and martial skills longer than most. He continued his teaching and practice as long as he was able, as well as the calligraphy and painting he had mastered in Macau during World War II, and in his last days took the time to tell stories of his past to his family, especially his youngest child Jasmine, who was then 21. One night in 1961, in Hong Kong, he died peacefully in his sleep at home.

== Legacy ==
=== Dong family ===
After Dong Yingjie's death in 1961, his daughter and youngest child Jasmine Mood-lay Tung (董茉莉, Pinyin: Dǒng Mòlì, Jyutping: dung2 mut6 lei6, 1940–2009) continued teaching at the Tung Ying Kit Tai Chi Chuan Gymnasium in Hong Kong, taking over as head of the school in 1966. She also taught in the UK, founded a school in Australia, and served as instructor and advisor to the Taiji Society of the Chinese University of Hong Kong. She was the first Hong Kong martial artist to become an International Wu Shu Federation referee, serving as referee and referee director for events in Hong Kong, mainland China, and Japan, including the 11th Asian Games in Beijing. She also served as president of the Hong Kong Wushu Federation and the Hong Kong Jingwu Athletic Association, and played a prominent role in promoting tai chi in Hong Kong and abroad.

Dong Yingjie's son Dong Junling (董俊嶺, born Dong Junbiao 董俊彪, 1923–1983) worked closely with the family in Hong Kong for several years, where among other things he posed with his brother Tung Hu Ling (Dong Huling) for photographs of tai chi applications to be used in Tung Hu Ling's book, Methods of Applying Tai Chi Boxing (太極拳使用法). But in the early 1950s he returned home to Ren County in Hebei for good, where he continued to teach tai chi to a select group of students for many years, including his nephew, Tung Hu Ling's son Dong Zengchen.

Dong Yingjie's eldest son Tung Hu Ling (Dong Huling), who had played a prominent role in opening and growing Dong family schools in Hong Kong, Macau, and Southeast Asia, continued to lead classes there for about five years after his father's death. But in 1966 he was invited to promote tai chi on a tour of North America which he completed in 1967, after which he moved to Honolulu, Hawaii to establish a new school and home base in the USA.

Tung Hu Ling's son Tung Kai Ying (董繼英; Pinyin: Dǒng Jìyīng; Jyutping: dung2 gai3 ying1; 1941-) also led classes at the Southeast Asia locations, taking over in 1962 before joining him in Hawaii in 1969, and then founding a Los Angeles school in 1971. Tung Hu Ling's other son Dong Zeng Chen (董增辰, Pinyin: Dǒng Zēngchén, 1947-) taught in mainland China for many years before moving from Hebei to take over the Hawaii school after Tung Hu Ling's retirement in 1983, accompanied by his son Da De "Alex" Dong.

In 2003 Alex Dong (董大德, Pinyin: Dǒng Dàdé, 1971-), Dong Zeng Chen's son and great-grandson of Dong Yingjie, established a school in New York City, while his cousin Tung Chen-Wei David (董振威, Pinyin: Dǒng Zhènwēi, 1977-), Tung Kai Ying's son and another great-grandson of Dong Yingjie, is also a master instructor, based in Los Angeles. Like their grandfather and fathers before them, they regularly travel to lead classes and workshops, resulting in many additional schools and practice groups around the world. Dong Zeng Chen retired in 2021.

Dong Yingjie's granddaughter-in-law Cheng Hsiao-fen (鄭小芬, Jyutping: zeng6 siu2 fan1; Pinyin: Zhèng Xiǎofēn, 1955-) in Hong Kong and a long list of disciples worldwide also continue the Dong family tai chi tradition.

=== Dong family tai chi ===
Dong family tai chi training offers a strong foundation in Yang-style tai chi, and advanced training in Wu (Hao) and Dong styles. This Yang style is the classic traditional Yang Chengfu form as he taught it in the latter half of his career, and as Yang Chengfu, Dong Yingjie, and Tian Zhaolin (田兆林, 1891–1960) demonstrated in photos for the 1931 and 1934 books published under Yang's name, with small refinements by subsequent Dong family generations.

Each posture is taught with great attention to detail, and with an explanation of potential applications. Many students remain focused on the Yang slow form along with related drills, and some schools also teach shortened variations of that form to make practice convenient. But intermediate and advanced students may progress to the classic Yang-style straight sword (劍, Pinyin: jiàn) and saber (刀, Pinyin: dāo, also translated as "falchion" or "broadsword"), and Yang-style push hands (stationary, stepping, and four corners). When sufficient training space is available, advanced students may also learn the Yang-style spear (槍 Pinyin: qiāng, or often simply 桿, gān, "pole", because the Yang "spear" is actually a very long sturdy pole with one tapered end but no spear point; based on the shape Tung Kai Ying calls it a "lance").

Advanced students may also learn two Dong-style fast forms, a Wu (Hao)-style form, advanced saber and double saber forms, and stick forms.

Dong Yingjie collaborated with Yang Chengfu on development of what is now called the Dong-style Fa Jin Fast Form (發勁快拳, Pinyin: Fājìn Kuàiquán), completing it after Yang died. The majority of this form is similar to the Yang Chengfu form as it was performed in the early twentieth century, before most tai chi forms were slowed and smoothed out to make them more accessible to the general public, in a swift-slow tempo and optionally with fa jin and the double jump kick from the old version of the form. It also includes some postures Dong developed from his training with Wu (Hao)-style master Li Baoyu.

Dong then developed his Yingjie Fast Form (英傑快拳, Pinyin: Yīngjié Kuàiquán), and introduced it to the world in his 1948 book. It is based on advanced Yang small frame and Wu (Hao) middle frame techniques that Dong developed from his training with Yang Shaohou and Li Baoyu. Like the other "fast form" this is performed in the old slow-swift tempo, and both may also be considered "application frame" (用架, Pinyin: yòngjià) forms.

The Wu (Hao) form is the old "kaihe" (開合) form of Hao Weizhen as taught by Dong Yingjie's teacher Li Baoyu, with small but significant refinements by the Dong family. It is most visibly distinct from other Wu (Hao) forms in its larger frame, forward-inclined postures, and internal strength projected through the fingers. This form emphasizes projecting internal strength ("neijin") to the outside perimeter of the body in all directions. Unlike the classic Yang-style metaphor of "an iron bar wrapped in cotton" this is more like "a crab shell on the outside, and soft inside". Therefore, the Dong family also call this their "Hard Form" to contrast it with the Yang Chengfu "soft" form. It is generally performed more slowly than in most purely Wu (Hao) lineages, so that advanced students can focus on the unique Wu (Hao)-style internal training it contains, because this is the Dong family's only Wu (Hao) form. In some Wu (Hao) lineages this is an advanced fast (slow-swift tempo) form, but in Dong family schools that next step is offered through the Dong family fast forms described above.

Tung Hu Ling contributed all the saber and stick forms in the curriculum, including the standard Yang-style saber form and also advanced saber forms he created based on the teachings of Yang Chengfu's older brother, Yang Shaohou, one for single saber and one for double sabers, vigorous routines that include long leaps, jump kicks, reverse spins, and challenging circles. Tung Hu Ling for a time taught those forms using sticks rather than swords, as sticks were easier to carry and practice with under the laws of British Hong Kong. He and his family further developed the stick forms into separate routines after moving abroad. He also created unique two-person push hands sets in Thailand, because many students there have a very martial orientation.

Dong Yingjie taught that there are in fact not three separate large, medium, and small "frames" of Yang style, that mastery of one will allow a student to understand the others and move freely between them, that all tai chi lineages including Wu (Hao) have a deep relationship, and that the Yang Chengfu "large frame" is simply the best place for beginners to start. And so Dong Yingjie and his son Tung Hu Ling were modest about their contributions to the art, and were never known to criticize other styles or masters.

=== Dong family legacy ===
The Dong family now has tai chi students in over 20 countries and territories around the world, while maintaining connections to China including their ancestral home Xingtai. Though Dong Yingjie may not be as well known in the West as some other masters, many seeking to learn tai chi for health or martial arts training have found their way to him and his successors. (Note: For example, American Kenpo karate master Will Tracy learned the slow form from him in 1956-57. See YangChengFu.org retrieved January 10, 2021) He was a champion, a master of multiple styles with his own synthesis, and he established a lasting legacy that has continued to thrive, with many affiliated schools in North and South America, Europe, and Asia.

== Bibliography ==
DeLeonardis, Anthony (July 1967). "The 'Grand Ultimate Fist' of Tai Chi Chuan". Black Belt. ISSN 0277-3066.

Dong, Alex; Saltman, David (2017). Grand Master. New York: Hudson River Books. ISBN 978-0-9985329-0-5.

Dong, Zeng Chen (2016). Dong Style Tai Ji Quan. ISBN 978-1535460774.

Du, Yimin; 杜, 宜民 (1988). 太极阴风掌 [Taiji Yin Wind Palm] (in Chinese). Shijiazhuang, Hebei: 花山文艺出版社. ISBN 7-80505-0643.

Li, Jianqing, ed. (2006). 永年太极拳志 [Yongnian Taijiquan Gazetteer] (in Chinese). Beijing: 人民体育出版社出版. ISBN 7-5009-3044-5.

Qu, Shijing; 瞿, 世镜 (2012). 杨氏太极两岸一家 [Yang Family Tai Chi: One Family Across the Straits] (in Chinese). Shanghai: 上海古籍出版社. ISBN 9789868609723.

Shirota, Jon (August 1972). "Tai Chi Chuan -- Art of Passive Resistance". Black Belt. ISSN 0277-3066.

Smalheiser, Marvin (June 1985). "A Little History on Hao Style". T'ai Chi. Vol. 9, no. 3. Wayfarer Publications. ISSN 0730-1049.

Smalheiser, Marvin (August 1988). "T'ai Chi Lance: New Skills From An Ancient Weapon". T'ai Chi. Vol. 12, no. 4. Wayfarer Publications. ISSN 0730-1049.

Tung, Hu-ling (1956). 太極拳使用法 [Methods of Applying Taiji Boxing] (in Chinese).

Tung, Kai Ying (2012). Learning Tai Chi Chuan. ISBN 978-0-9849582-0-7.

Tung, Ying-chieh (1948). 太極拳釋義 [The Meaning and Significance of T'ai Chi Ch'uan Practice]. Hong Kong editions published by C & C Joint Printing Co., (H.K.) Ltd., no ISBN, distributed worldwide by Alex Dong Tai Chi in Traditional Chinese and partial English translation editions; Taiwan edition published by Dah Jaan Publishing in Traditional Chinese, ISBN 978-986-346-242-2; mainland edition published by Beijing Science and Technology Publishing Co. Ltd. in Simplified Chinese (董英杰太极拳释义), ISBN 9787530486351.

Wu, Ta-yeh (February 1993). "The T'ai Chi Ch'uan Of Tung Huling". T'ai Chi. Vol. 17, no. 1. Wayfarer Publications. ISSN 0730-1049.

Wu, Ta-yeh (April 1993). "Yang Chengfu's Earlier and Latest Taijiquan". T'ai Chi. Vol. 17, no. 2. Wayfarer Publications. ISSN 0730-1049.

Wu, Ta-yeh (1993). Internal Training of Taijiquan.

Yang, Chengfu (1931). 太極拳使用法 [Methods of Applying Taiji Boxing] (in Chinese).

Yang, Chengfu (1934). The Essence and Applications of Taijiquan [太極拳體用全書]. Translated by Swaim, Louis. Berkeley, CA: Blue Snake Books. ISBN 978-1556435454.

Yip, Y.L. (Autumn 1998). "A Perspective on the Development of Taijiquan". Qi: The Journal of Traditional Eastern Health and Fitness. Vol. 8, no. 3. Insight Publishers. ISSN 1056-4004.

Yip, Y.L. (Autumn 2002). "Pivot — Taiji's Wu Gong Yee vs. White Crane's Chan Hak Fu". Qi: The Journal of Traditional Eastern Health and Fitness. Vol. 12, no. 3. Insight Publishers. ISSN 1056-4004.

Yu, Gongbao; 余, 功保 (2013). 董家太极: 董英杰太极拳传承与精义 [Dong Family Taiji: Dong Yingjie Taijiquan Tradition and Essentials] (in Chinese). Beijing: 当代中国出版社. ISBN 978-7-5154-0180-5. (Includes documentary on DVD, in Mandarin and some Cantonese, with no Chinese or foreign subtitles.)
