= Wu Yanxia =

Chinese martial artist

Wu Yanxia 吳雁霞
- Born: 1930
- Died: 2001 (aged 70–71)
- Nationality: Chinese
- Style: Wu-style tai chi

Wu Yanxia
- Traditional Chinese: 吳雁霞
Transcriptions
Standard Mandarin
- Hanyu Pinyin: Wú Yànxiá
- Wade–Giles: Wu^{2} Yen^{4}-hsia^{2}
Yue: Cantonese
- Yale Romanization: Ng4 Ngaan6 Ha4

Wu Yanxia or Wu Yen-hsia (1930–2001) was a Chinese tai chi teacher of Manchu ancestry.

== Biography ==
She was the daughter of Wu Gongyi (1900-1970) from whom she learned tai chi. She also helped teach her father's students. Wu Yanxia was the younger sister of Wu Ta-k'uei and Wu Daqi, and married Kuo Hsiao-chung, who was also a disciple of her father. She held the position of senior instructor of the Wu family from 1996 to her death in 2001 and was succeeded by her cousin Wu Daxin.

Wu Yanxia moved to Hong Kong from Shanghai in 1948. In an interview late in her life, she mentioned that she had often seconded her older brother Wu Ta-k'uei at his many challenge fights in those years. She mentioned applying first aid to injuries resulting from the fights, and that she was "fearful that someone would be killed and there would be big trouble for the family" because her brother was "young and overly fierce".

She attended to the affairs of the Jianquan Taijiquan Association while training her students and disciples. She became known as a specialist with the tai chi sword and tai chi spear.

== See also ==
- 108-form Wu family tai chi
