= 108-form Wu family tai chi =

Form of tai chi developed in the 1900s

108-Form Wu family tai chi, also known as Wu Jianquan-style tai chi, is a traditional form of tai chi that originated in China. It is named after its creator, Wu Jianquan, who developed this style of tai chi in the early 20th century.

The different slow-motion solo-form training sequences of tai chi are the manifestations of tai chi best known to the general public. In English, they are usually called the hand form or just the form. In Mandarin, it is usually called quan (Chinese: 拳; pinyin: quán; Wade–Giles: ch'üan²). They are performed slowly by beginners and are said to promote concentration, condition the body, and acquaint students with the inventory of motion techniques for more advanced styles of martial arts training. There are also solo weapons forms, as well as much shorter and repetitive sequences to train power-generation-leverages as a form of qigong. The various forms of Wu-style pushing hands have their own one-person drill routines, as well, which fulfil some of the same functions as the power-generation drills.

== History ==
Wu Jianquan was born in 1870 in the Hebei province of China, into a family of martial artists. His father, Wu Quanyou, was a student of Yang Luchan, the founder of Yang-style tai chi. Wu Jianquan began learning martial arts from his father at a young age and later went on to study under Yang Banhou, the son of Yang Luchan.

In the early 1900s, Wu Jianquan founded his own school of tai chi in Shanghai, where he taught his unique style to students from all over China. He combined the principles of tai chi with his family's martial arts techniques, creating a new style, which came to be known as Wu Jianquan-style tai chi.

== Training ==
Training in Wu Jianquan-style tai chi typically involves learning the basic movements and principles of tai chi, as well as the specific movements of the 108 forms. Students begin by learning the basic stances, hand and foot movements, and basic breathing techniques, before progressing to more advanced movements.

The style also includes partner drills and sparring exercises, where students learn to apply the principles of tai chi in a practical setting. In addition, Wu Jianquan-style tai chi also includes various forms of Qigong, or energy cultivation exercises that are designed to improve the body's internal energy and to enhance health.

== Forms ==
The 108-Form Wu Family tai chi is a long and complex form, consisting of 108 movements that are performed in a slow, continuous, and flowing manner. It emphasizes the use of softness and yielding to overcome hardness and force, using circular movements and spiralling energy to deflect attacks and neutralize an opponent's force.

The style emphasizes the importance of relaxation and internal energy, using the breath and the mind to guide the movements. Practitioners of Wu Jianquan-style tai chi believe that by cultivating internal energy, or Qi, they can enhance their health, improve their mental focus, and develop their martial arts skills.

=== List of forms ===
The following list is an English translation from Chinese of the empty-hand or fist-form list published in Wu Kung-tsao's Wu Family T'ai Chi Ch'uan. Different schools will use different translations. Notably, the family's Shanghai branch has a different enumeration scheme, numbering the same "long form" routine sequence with 89 posture names instead of 108. Almost all of the individual posture names are the same, however.

For each unique form name, there is a literal translation, the Hong Kong school's translation, and then the Shanghai school's translation in italics where they differ, followed by the original Chinese characters:

1. Begin Tai Chi Form – The Beginning of Tai Chi – The Preparation Form 太極起式

2. Raise Hands Above Posture – Raise Hands – Raise Hand and Step Up 提手上勢

3. Hand Plays Pipa – Play Guitar – Hand Strums the Lute 手揮琵琶

4. Grasp Bird's Tail 攬雀尾

5. Single Whip 單鞭

6. Slant Flying Posture (also known as Slant Single Whip) – Flying Oblique 斜飛勢 (斜單鞭)

7. Raise Hands Above Posture 提手上勢

8. White Crane Spreads Wings – White Stork Flaps its Wings 白鶴亮翅

9. Brush Knee Push Step Left and Right 4 Times – Brush Knee Twist Step 摟膝拗步左右四度

10. Hand Plays Pipa 手揮琵琶

11. Step Forward, Deflect, Parry, Punch – Step Up Diverting and Blocking Fist 進步搬攔捶

12. As If Seemingly Sealed Shut (also known as Push Forward) – As if Closing Up 如封似閉 (進按)

13. Carry Tiger to the Mountain – Tiger and Leopard Spring to the Mountain 抱虎歸山

14. Cross Hands 十

15. Slant Brush Knee Push Step 斜摟膝拗步

16. Turn Body Brush Knee Push Step 轉身摟膝拗步

17. Grasp Bird's Tail 攬雀尾

18. Single Whip (also known as Slant Single Whip) 單鞭 (斜單鞭)

19. Fist Under Elbow Punch 肘底看捶

20. Fall to Repulse Monkey Left and Right 3 Times 倒攆猴左右三度

21. Slant Flying Posture 斜飛勢

22. Raise Hands Above Posture 提手上勢

23. White Crane Spreads Wings 白鶴亮翅

24. Brush Knee Push Step 摟膝拗步

25. Sea Bottom Needle – Needle at Sea Bottom – Needle at the Bottom of the Sea 海底針

26. Fan Through Back – Play Arms like a Fan 扇通背

27. Rotate Body Away Body Punch – Strike Fist to Back – Parry and Punch 翻身撇身捶

28. Step Back, Deflect, Parry, Punch – Move Step Diverting and Blocking Punch 退步搬攔捶

29. Step Up Grasp Bird's Tail 上步攬雀尾

30. Single Whip 單鞭

31. Cloud Hands (3 Times) 雲手 (三度)

32. Single Whip 單鞭

33. Left High Pat Horse 左高探馬

34. Right Separate Foot Kick – Right Parting Leg 右分腳

35. Right High Pat Horse 右高探馬

36. Left Separate Foot Kick – Left Parting Leg 左分腳

37. Turn Body Kick with Heel – Turn Body Pedaling Foot 轉身蹬腿

38. Brush Knee Push Step Twice 摟膝拗步二度

39. Step Forward Punch Down 進步栽捶

40. Rotate Body Away Body Punch 翻身撇身捶

41. High Pat Horse 高探馬

42. Right Separate Hands 右分手

43. First Raise Foot Kick 一起腳

44. Step Back Seven Stars 退步七星

45. Step Back Hit Tiger Posture – Retreat Step Beat the Tiger 退步打虎勢

46. Second Raise Foot Kick 二起腳

47. Double Peaks Pierce Ears – Strike the Ears with Double Fists 雙峰貫耳

48. Lean Back Kick with Toe – Open Body and Kick 披身踢腿

49. Turn Body Kick with Heel 轉身蹬腿

50. High Pat Horse 高探馬

51. Step Forward, Deflect, Parry, Punch 進步搬攔捶

52. As If Seemingly Sealed Shut (also known as Push Forward) 如封似閉 (進按)

53. Carry Tiger to the Mountain 抱虎歸山

54. Cross Hands 十字手

55. Slant Brush Knee Push Step 斜摟膝拗步

56. Turn Body Brush Knee Push Step 轉身摟膝拗步

57. Grasp Bird's Tail 攬雀尾

58. Single Whip (also known as Slant Single Whip) 單鞭 (斜單鞭)

59. Hand Plays Pipa 手揮琵琶

60. Wild Horse Separate Mane – Parting the Wild Horse's Mane 野馬分鬃

61. Hand Plays Pipa 手揮琵琶

62. Wild Horse Separate Mane 3 Times 野馬分鬃三度

63. Hand Plays Pipa 手揮琵琶

64. Wild Horse Separate Mane 野馬分鬃

65. Jade Lady Works Shuttles Twice – Jade Girl Works at the Shuttle 玉女穿梭二度

66. Hand Plays Pipa 手揮琵琶

67. Wild Horse Separate Mane 野馬分鬃

68. Jade Lady Works Shuttles Twice – Jade Girl Works at the Shuttle 玉女穿梭二度

69. Grasp Bird's Tail 攬雀尾

70. Single Whip 單鞭

71. Cloud Hands (3 Times) 雲手 (三度)

72. Single Whip 單鞭

73. Downward Posture (also known as Snake Creeps Down Posture) 下勢 (蛇身下勢)

74. Left Golden Rooster on One Leg – Golden Cockerel Standing on One Leg 左金雞獨立

75. Right Golden Rooster on One Leg 右金雞獨立

76. Fall to Repulse Monkey Left and Right 3 Times 倒攆猴左右三度

77. Cross Slant Flying Posture 橫斜飛勢

78. Raise Hands Above Posture 提手上勢

79. White Crane Spreads Wings 白鶴亮翅

80. Brush Knee Push Step 摟膝拗步

81. Sea Bottom Needle 海底針

82. Fan Through Back 扇通背

83. Rotate Body Away Body Punch 翻身撇身捶

84. Step Up, Deflect, Parry, Punch 上步搬攔捶

85. Step Up Grasp Bird's Tail 上步攬雀尾

86. Single Whip 單鞭

87. Cloud Hands (3 Times) 雲手 (三度)

88. Single Whip 單鞭

89. High Pat Horse 高探馬

90. Slap Face Palm – Palm Goes to Meet the Face 撲面掌

91. Rotate Body Single Swing Lotus – Turn Body Cross Swing Lotus 翻身單擺蓮

92. Brush Knee Push Step 摟膝拗步

93. Step Up Finger Stop Punch – Pointing to the Crotch Punch 上步指擋捶

94. Step Up Grasp Bird's Tail 上步攬雀尾

95. Single Whip 單鞭

96. Downward Posture (also known as Snake Creeps Down Posture) 下勢 (蛇身下勢 )

97. Step Up Seven Stars 上步七星

98. Step Back Ride Tiger 退步跨虎

99. Turn Body Slap Face Palm – Turn Body Hit Face Palm 轉身撲面掌

100. Rotate Body Double Swing Lotus – Turn Body Double Swing Lotus 翻身雙擺蓮

101. Bend Bow Shoot Tiger – Curve Bow Shoot Tiger 彎弓射虎

102. High Pat Horse 高探馬

103. Slap Face Palm 撲面掌

104. Rotate Body Away Body Punch 翻身撇身捶

105. Step Up High Pat Horse 上步高探馬

106. Step Up Grasp Bird's Tail 上步攬雀尾

107. Single Whip 單鞭

108. Conclusion of Tai Chi – Closing Tai Chi 合太極
