= Yang Shaohou =

Chinese martial artist (1862–1930)

Yang Shaohou 楊少侯
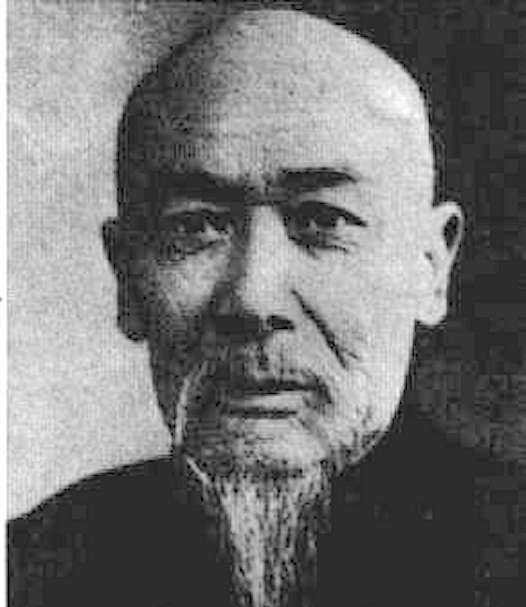
- Born: Yang Zhaoxiong (楊兆熊); 1862; Yongnian County, Heibei, China
- Died: 1930 (aged 67–68); Nanjing, China
- Other names: Yang Mengxiang (杨梦祥)
- Style: Yang-style tai chi

Other information
- Notable students: Wu Gongyi; Wu Gongzao; Dong Yingjie; Chen Weiming; Xu Yusheng (許禹生); Tian Zhaolin (田兆麟); Yang Zhensheng (楊振聲); Wu Tunan (吴图南); Zhang Huchen (张虎臣); Gu Luping (顾履平)

Yang Shaohou
- Traditional Chinese: 楊少侯
- Simplified Chinese: 杨少侯
Transcriptions
Standard Mandarin
- Hanyu Pinyin: Yáng Shàohóu
- Wade–Giles: Yang^{2} Shao^{4}-hou^{2}

Yang Shaohou (Chinese: 楊少侯; pinyin: Yáng Shàohóu; 1862–1930) was a Chinese martial arts master who, along with Yang Chengfu (楊澄甫; 1883–1936), represents the third generation of Yang-style tai chi. Grandmaster of his generation and known for his compact "small-frame" techniques, he was a ferocious fighter and a demanding teacher.

== Early life ==
Yang began learning tai chi at age 7, in Beijing under his father Yang Jianhou, his uncle Yang Banhou (who formally adopted him), and his grandfather — the founder of Yang-style tai chi — Yang Luchan. His name at birth was Yang Zhaoxiong (楊兆熊, Pinyin: Yáng Zhàoxióng). But as was common in the era, as he reached adulthood he took the courtesy name Yang Mengxiang (楊梦祥, Pinyin: Yáng Mèngxiáng), and after he earned a reputation he changed it to Yang Shaohou. Shaohou can be translated as "young noble", and makes use of the "hou" (侯) character from his father's and uncle's names in a reflection of respect for his lineage and his status as grandmaster of his generation.

== Career ==
Many of his contemporaries called him "Mr. Big" (大先生, Pinyin: dà xiānshēng), which can also be translated as "Mr. Eldest" or "Mr. Great" — a play on words as he was the eldest brother in his family, the senior disciple and grandmaster of his tai chi generation, and a great fighter who loomed large in the fears of many — while others called him "Thousand Hands Guanyin" (千手觀音, Pinyin: Qiānshǒu Guānyīn) or "Holy Hands Guanyin" (聖手觀音, Shèngshǒu Guānyīn), which was in praise of his pushing hands techniques, as unlike that deity he was not known for his compassion.

Yang Shaohou had a very forceful nature, and like his uncle Banhou he was a demanding teacher, only interested in students that could stand their tough training regimes. It is said that he enforced low stance training by making students perform postures underneath food preparation tables, he preferred to demonstrate rather than explain, and he was not known for pulling his punches. Often as soon as he crossed hands with a student in push hands, he attacked suddenly with great force, and the student did not know what to do. This approach attracted few, but he in fact preferred to limit and focus his time and attention as a teacher.

He taught at the Beiping Sports Research Institute (北平體育研究社, Pinyin: Běipíng Tǐyù Yánjiūshè) as well as an associated institute and club, but preferred to give private lessons to disciples and other serious students in small groups or individual sessions. He briefly travelled to teach in Shanghai, Hangzhou, Suzhou, and Nanjing, but preferred Beijing. Everywhere he went, he earned his reputation as an indomitable fighter, but as a teacher only to a select few disciples.

He also practiced traditional Chinese medicine, treating patients with a combination of Yang family herbal formulas and a prescription of regular tai chi practice. Upon curing one municipal official of a liver ailment with just such a combination, he gained a great following and 200 citizens of that town asked him to train them in tai chi. However he remained very selective about which students he took on — some would say impatient and irritable — and trained only the official that time, but work like this did help to maintain strong ties between government officials and the Yang family.

Sixth-generation Yang style Master Yang Jun reports family tradition describing him like this: "The spirit from his eyes would shoot out in all directions, flashing like lightning. Combined with a sneer, a sinister laugh, and the sounds of "Heng!" and "Ha!", his imposing manner was quite threatening."

== Small frame, little fame ==
=== Founding generations ===
The tai chi of Yang Shaohou and his younger brother Yang Chengfu represent the final refinement of the three founding generations of Yang family tai chi. Disciples and students of Yang Shaohou tai chi hold that Yang style founder Yang Luchan's "old frame" (老架, Pinyin: lǎojià) tai chi from the beginning contained the potential for what over time was separated into the two approaches those brothers now represent, Yang Shaohou's "small frame" (小架, Pinyin: xiǎojià) and Yang Chengfu's "large frame" (大架, Pinyin: dàjià). Today practitioners of the small frame often call their approach the "yong jia" (用架, Pinyin: yòngjià) which can be translated as "application frame", and the large frame the "lian jia" (練架, Pinyin: liànjià) or "training frame", though in fact both include training and applications.

By the third generation, the Yang family masters tended to teach the large frame to the public, while reserving the small frame and related training for palace officials, disciples, and other serious students. The large frame can be easier to teach to a big group, with relatively wide easy-to-see movements, and can be learned for health or for martial application. The small frame with its small circles is complex and difficult to master, and the training more quickly focuses on applications. The small frame was also better suited to students wearing imperial robes.

In the first two generations, all variations retained sudden bursts of speed, high kicks, low stances, leaps, and "fa jin" (發勁; Pinyin: fājìn) or explosive energy. But in the second generation the focus of two sons diverged as they refined their teaching methods, as would happen again in the next generation. Second generation master Yang Jianhou developed his "middle frame" (中架, Pinyin: zhōngjià) form with a focus on bringing all the benefits of tai chi to more people, while his older brother and the grandmaster of that generation, Yang Banhou, concentrated on a more demanding range of training that appealed to few students. Banhou trained not only with their father Luchan but also with Wu (Hao) style founder Wu Yuxiang, building a reputation as a top fighter and accepting the most serious students only. Today some still practice Yang Banhou forms in large, medium, small, and fast frame, all very vigorous and strenuous, with such a difficult range of heights that some have called them "low frame", and he is especially known for his small frame form.

Also in the second generation, Manchu military officer Wu Quanyou trained under Yang Luchan and Yang Banhou, and began development of the small frame Wu-style tai chi for the Manchurian palace guard. As noted above, small frame tai chi was particularly effective for those wearing imperial robes. In the next generation, his son Wu Jianquan would join him in cofounding the Wu style.

In the third generation, Yang Chengfu widely promoted the large frame, standardizing that form with all slow movements suitable for teaching a wider range of students, and seldom taught or even mentioned the small frame, middle frame, or any fast form. He and his disciples established many training classes across China and published many books, all on only the large frame slow form and its associated two-person sets and applications. This is now the most famous and most widely practiced style of tai chi in the world.

Meanwhile, Yang Shaohou, after initially teaching his father Jianhou's middle frame, dedicated himself to his uncle Banhou's approach, further refining the small frame into his signature style. Twenty-one years older than Chengfu, he was of a more traditional generation that did not reveal everything about a martial art to the general public, and he did not have the temperament for such promotion anyway. Although he taught a minimal number of public classes on the large frame at a few institutes and clubs, Yang Shaohou preferred to focus on the small frame with just a few "indoor" disciples and other serious students who had already mastered the large frame or the Wu style, in small private sessions at private homes. As a result, his art is far less famous than his brother's.

=== Modern lineages ===
Yang Shaohou's tai chi is characterized by high and low postures, small complex circular movements, frequent changes of pace, and sharp crisp fa jin techniques accompanied by "heng" (哼, Pinyin: hēng) and "ha" (哈, Pinyin: hā) sounds.

According to an authoritative survey published in 2006, this has come down to us through just a few small select lineages today, each with at least one unique "application frame" form developed in collaboration with Yang Shaohou as he built on his students' previous training with others:

Yang Shaohou → Wu Tunan (吴图南, Pinyin: Wú Túnán; 1884–1989)

The empty-hand form taught by Wu Tunan generally follows the 73 posture sequence of the old Yang style, and was developed with Yang Shaohou on the foundation of Wu Tunan's Wu-style background. It contains 37 core postures plus repeats and transitions, and instructors often present it in 50 to 139 moves. In a 1928 publication Wu called it the "Three Generations Seven" (三世七) form, referring to the 37 postures and perhaps also in homage to the tai chi of Song Shuming (宋書銘), but today it is generally referred to as simply the "small frame form" or "application form". The movements are short with small circles and clear practical application, performed vigorously and fast, in as little as two and a half minutes.

Videos of Wu Tunan from the 1980s show him at around age 100 performing the form mostly at one height within a small area, but photos from the 1920s through the 1960s show him performing high kicks and extremely low postures, while his students Yu Zhijun (于志钧, Pinyin: Yú Zhìjūn) and Li Lian (李琏, Pinyin: Lǐ Liǎn) have published books demonstrating the same form with deep crouches, high kicks, and higher leaps, and in some videos Li uses a much wider area. Yu and Li are also known for their push hands and application skills, as was Wu Tunan. Yu's book on Wu Tunan and his tai chi includes Wu-style sword forms.

Wu accepted only two disciples, Ma Youqing and Sim Pooh Ho. Li Lian was a formal disciple of Ma, but also trained directly with Wu for twenty years, and is the foremost representative of this small frame lineage in mainland China today, teaching the application form Wu developed under Yang Shaohou. Sim Pooh Ho founded a school in Singapore that has trained European instructors as well and offers a broad tai chi curriculum, including the application form he and Wu developed based on Sim's original training in the Yang Chengfu form. Sim calls that form the "108 Chang Quan", the "Wu Tunan — Sim Pooh Ho Chang Quan", or simply the "Usage Set". Yu Zhijun, a university professor in the history of science, trained with Wu for forty years to a high level of mastery, and published several books on tai chi including a thorough study of Wu Tunan and his martial art. (A brief biography of Wu Tunan is in the Notable Students section below.)

Yang Shaohou → Zhang Huchen (张虎臣, Pinyin: Zhāng Hǔchén; 1898–1979)

Zhang Huchen was a disciple of Xu Yusheng (許禹生, Pinyin: Xǔ Yǔshēng; 1878-1945) and also trained with Yang Shaohou and Yang Chengfu. Zhang developed a complete system of small frame fast forms incorporating advanced training from Yang Shaohou, which he taught in a sports training institute Xu established in Beijing.

His "Three Solo Forms" are essentially the same 225 movement form, in three levels with three intents:
- Taiji Jia Shou (家手, Pinyin: jiāshǒu; "Family Hand") Solo Form - for martial arts fundamentals; about 60 min.
- Taiji Zheng Lu (正路, Pinyin: zhènglù; "Correct Path") Solo Form - simplified, for health; about 25 minutes
- Taiji Xiao Shi (小式, Pinyin: xiǎoshì; "Small Style") Solo Form - for martial arts techniques, including fa jin; 5 to 10 min.

The Jia Shou or family form is the foundational or original solo set, and is the training form in this system; the Zheng Lu form is the simplified set; and the Xiao She form is the application set. From these Zhang's disciple Liu Xiwen (刘习文, Pinyin: Liú Xíwén), has developed a combined form, and is also known for his push hands and application skills.

Yang Shaohou → Gu Lüping (顾履平, Pinyin: Gù Lǚpíng, courtesy name 顧麗生, Gù Lìshēng, 1904–1978)

Gu Luping trained with Yang Shaohou and Yang Chengfu in Nanjing before moving to Guizhou (贵州, Pinyin: Guìzhōu). His disciple Zhang Zhuoxing (张卓星, 1920-2001) also taught tai chi in Guizhou and authored books on the topic, including 太极拳锻炼要领 (Taijiquan Training Essentials), and with Gu Luping and another teacher also 太极推手二十六式 (Tai Chi Push Hands: Twenty Six Styles). Gu's disciple Chi Qingsheng (池庆升, 1948-) brought this lineage to Hong Kong, and it has spread to Southeast Asia and the world from there.

Their primary empty hand small frame solo form was originally organized into 85 postures similar to the standard Yang Chengfu pattern, yet still a different form with an "application frame" training approach including a slow-swift tempo, a small frame, and fa jin, and it has since been refined to 78 postures.

Others

Other disciples and close students listed in the Disciples section below do not appear to have founded ongoing lineages large enough for inclusion in the 2006 survey, or they did not found lineages in only the small frame, but were active in tai chi and well-known during their lifetimes.

Weapons

Yang Shaohou's favorite weapon was an iron seal carving stylus (鐵筆/铁笔, Pinyin: tiěbǐ), preferably one in each hand. He said weapons are just extensions of the hands, and felt he could better demonstrate tai chi moves while holding those small pointy tools. That potentially dangerous teaching method, along with his famously crippling empty-hand attacks, have not been included in the public curriculums of subsequent generations.

Although he undoubtedly learned other weapons forms from his father and uncle, may have taught the more widely known Yang-style weapons forms when he deigned to teach public classes, and likely developed other routines and techniques himself, he apparently established no specific lineage of weapons training. In fact as noted above, Yu Zhijun's thorough book on the tai chi of Yang Shaohou disciple Wu Tunan includes only Wu (吳, Pinyin: Wú) style sword forms.

== Notable students ==
=== Internationally well-known students ===
Wu Gongyi and Wu Kung-tsao trained with Yang Shaohou, based on a tradition that required they be taught by teachers of the same lineage generation as their grandfather, Wu-style cofounder Wu Quanyou, who died while they were infants. Their father Wu Jianquan and Yang Shaohou were both famous for their "small frame" martial expertise, and this training laid a strong foundation for the Wu brothers' mastery of their family style. Wu Gongyi's famous 1954 public match in Macau against a master of Tibetan White Crane, and even more so his son Wu Ta-k'uei's reputation as a fierce brawler, might have made Yang Shaohou proud.

Dong Yingjie trained with Yang Shaohou in Beijing while preparing to serve as Yang Chengfu's chief assistant instructor, and later incorporated aspects of Yang Shaohou's "small frame" and fa jin techniques into his own Dong family tai chi advanced fast forms. Dong taught that mastery of any size "frame" of Yang style would enable mastery of the others, and although he felt that the Yang Chengfu "large frame" was the best place to start he never criticized other frames, styles, or masters.

=== Disciples and close students ===
In martial arts circles, Yang Shaohou regarded only Xu Yusheng (許禹生, Pinyin: Xǔ Yǔshēng; 1878–1945) and Chen Weiming (陳微明, Pinyin: Chén Wēimíng; 1881–1958) as friends and confidants. He did not formally claim them as disciples, as Xu was a disciple of his father and both of them of his younger brother, yet of all his students Xu Yusheng may have acquired the most skills in Shaohou's small frame style. Xu and Chen were highly placed and influential in official education circles, they retained the Yang brothers to teach at their institutes and clubs, and they collaborated with each other on books about Yang tai chi. Both had tolerant personalities that allowed them to train most harmoniously with and befriend Yang Shaohou.

Yang Zhensheng (楊振聲, Pinyin: Yáng Zhènshēng; 1878–1939) trained to a high level of skill under his father Yang Shaohou and his uncle Yang Chengfu, and went on to teach tai chi in Shanghai and Kunming in the 1930s. During the Japanese occupation he went missing in Hebei and was never found, but three of his sons and their many descendants have continued the Yang family tai chi lineage.

Wu Tunan (吴图南, Pinyin: Wú Túnán; 1884–1989) was Yang Shaohou's last living direct disciple. Born into a prominent Mongolian warrior clan in Beijing and originally named Ulabu (烏拉布, Pinyin: Wū Lā Bù), he was not strong as a child and so his father had him trained in martial arts. Beginning at age nine he studied the Wu style under Wu Jianquan for eight years, then Yang style under Yang Shaohou for four years. As explained above, those four years were equivalent to advanced graduate training offered only to those who had already mastered the Yang large frame or the Wu style. An educator and a scholar, Wu wrote extensively on tai chi, founded the lineage described above, and at age 100 was still performing his small frame form for the public. In the 1980s he received awards recognizing his lifelong accomplishments, and he died in 1989 at age 105.

Other disciples and close students of Yang Shaohou include the two disciples mentioned above, Gu Luping (顾履平, Gù Lǚpíng) and Zhang Huchen (张虎臣, Zhāng Hǔchén), as well as Tian Zhaolin (田兆麟 Pinyin: Tiān Zhàolín; 1891–1959; adopted by Yang Jianhou, disciple of Jianhou and Chengfu), Dong Runfang (東潤芳, Dōng Rúnfāng), You Zhixue (尤志學, Yóu Zhìxué), Ma Runzhi (馬潤之, Mǎ Rúnzhī), and Li Shou Jian (李壽箋, Lǐ Shòujiān).

== Final years ==
Yang Shaohou found himself living in increasingly strained circumstances in Beiping after the government moved south to Nanjing in 1927. In 1928 his younger brother Yang Chengfu led a group of disciples south to establish training classes across the region, and found success. Yang Shaohou eventually accepted an invitation to teach in Nanjing arranged by a patron, the minister of transportation. But after taking up the position in the fall of 1929, he quarreled with a ministry official and left in anger. He returned to Beiping, but by that winter had traveled back to Nanjing after being unable to arrange new work.

He died in January 1930, in Nanjing. According to newspaper reports at the time, he took his own life with a pair of scissors while living as a guest at the home of his patron, the transportation minister. He may have become depressed over finding himself an aging widower living in reduced circumstances, with no immediate prospects of earning a living on his own, and had been using opium. He reportedly stated he was committing suicide to protect the Yang family reputation. His patron brought him to a hospital but was unable to save him, then raised funds to assist the family, now led by Yang Chengfu, with the funeral arrangements.

Yang Shaohou was initially buried in Nanjing. But after Yang Chengfu died in 1936 due to illness, Chengfu's wife Hou Zhuqing sold all her valuables and raised additional funds from supporters to transport both brothers for burial in their hometown, Yongnian.

== Bibliography ==
- Chu, Vincent (December 2006). "Yang Style's Three Solo Forms: Interview with Liu Xiwen". T'ai Chi. Vol. 20, no. 6. Wayfarer Publications. ISSN 0730-1049.
- Chu, Vincent; Liu, Xiwen (December 2008). "The Story of Yang Shaohou". T'ai Chi. Vol. 32, no. 6. Wayfarer Publications. ISSN 0730-1049.
- Li, Jianqing, ed. (2006). 永年太极拳志 [Yongnian Taijiquan Gazetteer] (in Simplified Chinese). Beijing: 人民体育出版社出版 [People's Sports Publishing House]. ISBN 7-5009-3044-5.
- Li, Lian; 李, 琏 (2003). 杨少侯太极拳用架真诠 [Yang Shaohou Taijiquan Application Frame: The True Explanation] (in Simplified Chinese). Beijing: 人民体育出版社. ISBN 7-5009-2344-9.
- Li, Lian; 李, 璉 (2005). 楊少侯太極拳用架真詮 [Yang Shao-hou T'ai-chi Ch'üan Application Frame: The True Explanation] (in Traditional Chinese). Taipei: 大展出版社有限公司. ISBN 978-957-468-381-9.
- Liu, Xiwen; Chu, Vincent (April 2008). "The Tai Chi of Sung Shu Ming". T'ai Chi. Vol. 32, no. 2. Wayfarer Publications. ISSN 0730-1049.
- Liu, Xiwen; 刘, 习文 (December 2009). "杨氏太极拳大、中、小架的实践与认识" [Yang Style Taijiquan Large, Medium and Small Frame Practice and Understanding]. Wǔ Hún 武魂 [Martial Spirit] (in Simplified Chinese). Vol. 2009–2010, no. 12, 1, 2. ISSN 1002-3267.
- Yeo, Alex (April 2007). "Sim Pooh Ho: The Practice of Taiji Gong". T'ai Chi. Vol. 31, no. 2. Wayfarer Publications. ISSN 0730-1049.
- Yeo, Alex (June 2007). "Sim Pooh Ho: The Practice of Taiji Gong — Part 2". T'ai Chi. Vol. 31, no. 3. Wayfarer Publications. ISSN 0730-1049.
- Yeo, Alex (August 2007). "Taijiquan's 'Clear Spring, Still Rivers' (Sim Pooh Ho — Part 3)". T'ai Chi. Vol. 31, no. 4. Wayfarer Publications. ISSN 0730-1049.
- Yu, Zhijun; 于, 志钧 (2018). 吴图男太极拳精粹 [Wu Tunan Taijiquan Essentials] (in Simplified Chinese). Beijing: 当代中国出版社. ISBN 978-7-5154-0861-3.
- Zhou, Lishang (April 2002). "The Applications Frame of Yang Style (interview with Li Lian)". T'ai Chi. Vol. 26, no. 2. Wayfarer Publications. ISSN 0730-1049.
- Zhou, Lishang (June 2002). "The Applications Frame of Yang Style — Part 2 (interview with Li Lian)". T'ai Chi. Vol. 26, no. 3. Wayfarer Publications. ISSN 0730-1049.
- Zhou, Lishang (August 2002). "Yang Applications Frame — Part 3 (interview with Li Lian)". T'ai Chi. Vol. 26, no. 4. Wayfarer Publications. ISSN 0730-1049.
- Zhou, Lishang (October 2002). "Yang Applications Frame — Part 4 (interview with Li Lian)". T'ai Chi. Vol. 26, no. 5. Wayfarer Publications. ISSN 0730-1049.
- Zhou, Lishang (February 2008). "Li Lian on Push Hands — Part 1". T'ai Chi. Vol. 32, no. 1. Wayfarer Publications. ISSN 0730-1049.
