= Yangjia Michuan tai chi =

Yangjia Michuan tai chi (simplified Chinese: 杨家秘传太极拳; traditional Chinese: 楊家秘傳太極拳; pinyin: yángjiā mìchuán tàijíquán), the Yang Family Secret Tradition is a tai chi style created by Yang Luchan, founder of the Yang style. He passed this special style to his son Yang Jianhou who transmitted it to his student Zhang Qinlin. Master Wang Yen-nien was taught the Yangjia Michuan by Zhang Qinlin and chose, in order to avoid the disappearance of this style, to teach it to a great number of students all over the world.

The Yangjia Michuan form has 127 movements, divided in three duan. Tuishou (push hands) and martial applications of the movements of the form have a central importance in this style.
