= Yang Luchan =

Chinese martial artist (1799–1872)

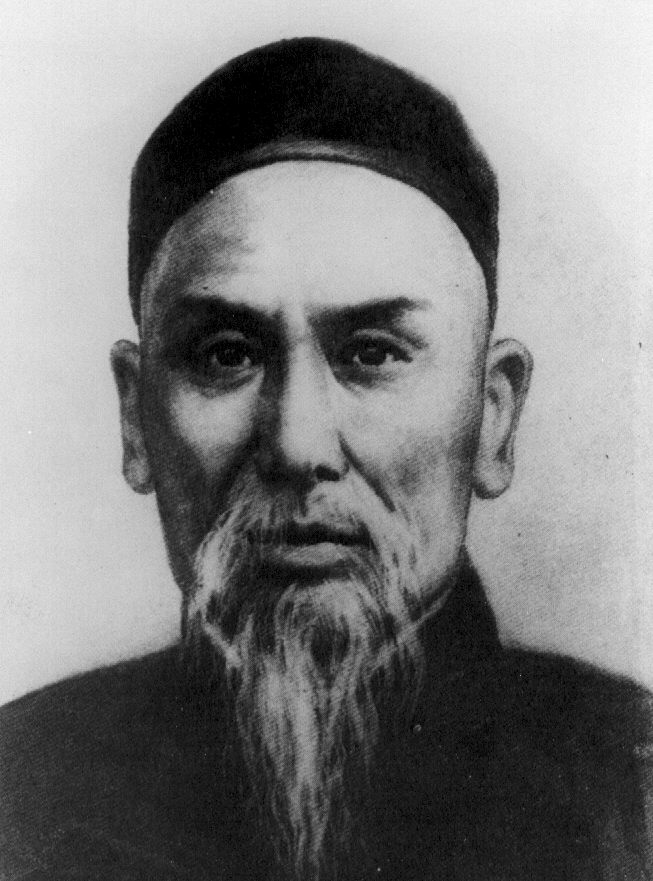
- Born: 1799; Guangping, Yongnian County, China
- Died: 1872 (aged 72–73)
- Native name: 杨露禅
- Other names: Yang Fukui; Yang Wudi
- Nationality: Chinese
- Style: Yang-style tai chi
- Teacher: Chen Changxing
- Rank: Founder of Yang-style tai chi

Other information
- Notable students: Yang Banhou; Yang Jianhou; Wu Yuxiang; Wu Quanyou

Yang Luchan
- Traditional Chinese: 楊露禪
- Simplified Chinese: 杨露禅
Transcriptions
Standard Mandarin
- Hanyu Pinyin: Yáng Lùchán
- Wade–Giles: Yang Lu-ch'an

Yang Fukui
- Traditional Chinese: 楊福魁
- Simplified Chinese: 杨福魁
Transcriptions
Standard Mandarin
- Hanyu Pinyin: Yáng Fúkuí
- Wade–Giles: Yang Fu-k'ui

Yang Wudi
- Traditional Chinese: 楊無敵
- Literal meaning: Yang the Invincible
Transcriptions
Standard Mandarin
- Hanyu Pinyin: Yáng Wúdí

Yang Luchan (Chinese: 杨露禅; pinyin: Yáng Lùchán; Wade–Giles: Yang Lu-ch'an), also known as Yang Fukui (1799–1872), was an influential Chinese practitioner and teacher of the internal style tai chi martial art. He is known as the founder of Yang-style tai chi, the most popular and widely practised tai chi style in the world today.

== History ==
Yang Luchan's family was a poor farming/worker class from Hebei Province, Guangping Prefecture, Yongnian County. Yang would follow his father in planting the fields and, as a teenager, held temporary jobs. One period of temporary work was spent doing odd jobs at the Taihetang Chinese pharmacy located in the west part of Yongnian City, opened by Chen Dehu of the Chen Village in Huaiqing Prefecture, Wen County, Henan. As a child, Yang liked martial arts and studied Changquan, gaining a certain level of skill.

One day Yang reportedly witnessed one of the partners of the pharmacy utilizing a style of martial art that he had never before seen to easily subdue a group of would-be thieves. Because of this, Yang requested to study with the pharmacy's owner, Chen Dehu. Chen referred Yang to the Chen Village to seek out his own teacher—the 14th generation of the Chen Family, Chen Changxing.

One night, he was awakened by the sounds of "Hen" (哼) and "Ha" (哈) in the distance. He got up and traced the sound to an old building. Peeking through the broken wall, he saw his master Chen Changxing teaching the techniques of grasp, control, and emitting jin in coordination with the sounds "Hen" and "Ha." He was amazed by the techniques and from that time on, unknown to master Chen, he continued to watch this secret practice session every night. He would then return to his room to ponder and study. Because of this, his martial ability advanced rapidly. One day, Chen ordered him to spar with the other disciples. To his surprise, none of the other students could defeat him. Chen realized that Yang had great potential and after that taught him the secrets sincerely.

After mastering the martial art, Yang was given permission by his teacher to go to Beijing and teach his own students, who would include Wu Yuxiang and his brothers, who were Imperial Chinese officials in the Imperial Chinese bureaucracy. In 1850, Yang was paid by wealthy residents to teach tai chi to them. Among this group was Yang's best known non-family student, Wu Quanyou. This was the beginning of the spread of tai chi from the family art of a small village in central China to an international phenomenon. Due to his influence and the number of teachers he trained, including his own descendants, Yang is directly acknowledged by 4 of the 5 tai chi families as having transmitted the art to them.

== The Legend of Yang Wudi ==
After emerging from Chenjiagou, Yang became famous for never losing a match and never seriously injuring his opponents. Having refined his martial skill to an extremely high level, Yang Luchan came to be known as Yang Wudi (Chinese: 楊無敵; lit. 'Yang the Invincible'). In time, many legends sprang up around Yang's martial prowess. These legends would serve to inform various biographical books and movies. Though not independently verifiable, several noteworthy episodes are worth mentioning to illustrate the Yang Wudi character:

- The House of Prince Duan, one of the royal families in the capital, employed a large number of boxing masters and wrestlers—some of which were anxious to have a trial of strength with Yang Luchan. Yang typically declined their challenges. One day, a famous boxing master of high prestige insisted on competing with Yang to see who was the stronger. The boxer suggested that they sit on two chairs and pit their right fists against each other. Yang Luchan had no choice but to agree. Shortly after the contest began, Duan's boxing master started to sweat all over and his chair creaked as if it were going to fall apart; Yang however looked as composed and serene as ever. Finally rising, Yang gently commented to the onlookers: "The Master's skill is indeed superb, only his chair is not as firmly made as mine." The other master was so moved by Yang's modesty that he never failed to praise his exemplary conduct and unmatched martial skill.
- Once while fishing at a lake, two other martial artists hoped to push Yang in the water and ruin his reputation. Yang, sensing the attacker's intention, arched his chest, rounded his back, and executed the High Pat on Horse technique. As his back arched and head bowed, the two attackers were bounced into the water simultaneously. He then said to them that he would be easy on them today; but if they were on the ground, he would have punished them more severely. The two attackers quickly swam away.
- In Beijing, a rich man called Chang heard of Yang's great skills and invited him to demonstrate his art. When Yang arrived, Chang thought little of his ability due to his small build—Yang simply did not "look" like a boxer. Yang was served a very simple dinner. Yang Luchan continued to behave like an honoured guest, despite his host's thoughts. Chang later questioned if Yang's tai chi, being so soft, could actually be used to defeat people. Given that he invited Yang on the basis of his reputation as a great fighter, this question was a veiled insult. Yang replied that there were only three kinds of people he could not defeat: men of brass, men of iron and men of wood. Chang invited out his best bodyguard, Liu, to test Yang's skill. Liu entered aggressively and attacked Yang. Yang, employing only a simple yielding technique, threw Liu across the yard. Chang was very impressed and immediately ordered a banquet to be prepared for Yang.

== Origin of the name "taijiquan" ==
In Chinese, tai chi is now known as taijiquan (literally "taiji boxing"). But when Yang Luchan first taught in Yongnian County, his art was referred to as Mianquan (綿拳 Cotton Fist) or Huaquan (化拳 Neutralising Fist). Whilst teaching at the Imperial Court, Yang met many challenges, some friendly some not. But he invariably won and in so doing he gained a great reputation. Many who frequented the imperial households would come to view his matches. At one such gathering in which Yang had won against several reputable opponents, the scholar Weng Tonghe was present. Inspired by the way Yang moved and executed his techniques, Weng felt that Yang's movements and techniques expressed the physical manifestation of the philosophy of taiji. Weng wrote for him a matching verse:

Hands Holding taiji shakes the whole world, a chest containing ultimate skill defeats a gathering of heroes.

Thereafter, Yang family history holds that taiji began to be used in reference to the martial art, although it is not until the turn of the 20th century that there is firm written evidence for the term "taijiquan".

== Legacy ==
Yang Luchan passed his art to:

- His second son, but oldest son to live to maturity, Yang Banhou (1837–1890), was also retained as a martial arts instructor by the Chinese Imperial family. Yang Banhou became the highest paid teacher of Wu Quanyou even though Yang Luchan was Wu's first tai chi teacher.
- His third son Yang Jianhou (1839–1917), who passed it to his sons, Yang Shaohou (1862–1930) and Yang Chengfu (1883–1936).
- Wu Yuxiang (1813–1880) who also developed his own Wu-style, which eventually, after three generations, led to the development of Sun-style tai chi.

Yang Luchan served as the protagonist in the wuxia novel Tou Quan by Gong Baiyu, published in 1940 in Tianjin.

== Bibliography ==
- Davis, Barbara (2004). Taijiquan Classics: An Annotated Translation. North Atlantic Books. ISBN 978-1-55643-431-0.
- Yang, Banhou (楊班侯, 1875*), 太極法說 (Explaining Taiji Principles), available online in Chinese and English translation at Scribd and also included in Chinese and English translation in Wile, Douglas (1996), Lost T'ai-chi Classics from the Late Ch'ing Dynasty, State University of New York Press, ISBN 0-7914-2653-X (*Scholars estimate the publication date to be between 1875 and 1910, and believe the author(s) to be Yang Banhou and/or his disciples)
- Wile, Douglas (1996). Lost T'a-Chi Classics from the Late Ch'ing Dynasty. State University of New York Press. ISBN 0-7914-2653-X.
- Li, Jianqing, Editor in Chief (李剑青, 主編, 2006), 永年太极拳志 (Yongnian Taijiquan Gazetteer), 人民体育出版社出版 (People's Sports Publishing House), ISBN 7-5009-3044-5.
