= Sun-style tai chi =

Chinese martial art

Sun-style tai chi 孙氏太极拳
- Date founded: start of 20th century
- Country of origin: China
- Founder: Sun Lutang
- Arts taught: Tai chi
- Ancestor arts: Wu (Hao)-style tai chi
- Practitioners: Sun Cunzhou (孙存周); Sun Jianyun (孙剑云); Sun Shurong (孙叔容); Sun Wanrong (孙婉容)

The Sun-style tai chi (Chinese: 孙氏太极拳; pinyin: Sūn shì tàijíquán) is one of the five primary styles of tai chi. It is well known for its smooth, flowing movements which omit the more physically vigorous crouching, leaping and fa jin of some other styles. Its gentle postures and high stances make it very suitable for martial arts therapy.

== History ==
Sun style tai chi was developed by Sun Lutang, who is considered expert in two other internal martial arts styles: xingyiquan and baguazhang before he came to study tai chi. Today, Sun-style ranks fourth in popularity and fifth in terms of seniority among the five family styles of tai chi. He was also considered an accomplished Neo-Confucian and Taoist scholar, especially in the I Ching and the tai chi classics. Sun learned Wu (Hao)-style tai chi from Hao Weizhen, who was Li Yiyu's (李亦畬) chief disciple. Sun-style tai chi is considered to be part of the umbrella of Sun-style internal martial arts developed by Sun Lutang.

Besides his earlier xingyiquan and baguazhang training, Sun's experiences with Hao Weizhen, Yang Shaohou, Yang Chengfu and Wu Jianquan influenced the development of what is today recognized as the Sun style of tai chi.

The Sun style is a syncretic martial art, influenced by tai chi, xingyiquan and baguazhang. One of the styles of tai chi influencing the Sun style is Wu (Hao). The footwork of both styles are similar in that when one foot advances or retreats, the other foot follows. The Sun style also exhibits small circular movements with the hand.

Sun's son Sun Cunzhou (孫存周; 1893–1963) and daughter, Sun Jianyun (孫劍雲; 1914–2003) were tai chi teachers, as well as Sun Cunzhou's daughter Sun Shurong (孫叔容; 1918–2005) who taught in Beijing until her death. Sun Wanrong (孫婉容; 1927—Present), who is the other daughter of Sun Cunzhou, still teaches tai chi in Beijing.
