= Yang Jianhou =

Yang Jianhou 杨健侯
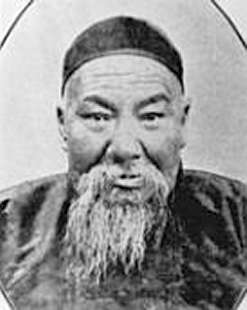
- Born: 1839; China
- Died: 1917 (aged 77–78)
- Style: Yang-style tai chi

Other information
- Notable students: Yang Chengfu; Tian Zhaolin (田兆麟)

Yang Jianhou
- Traditional Chinese: 楊健侯
- Simplified Chinese: 杨健侯
Transcriptions
Standard Mandarin
- Hanyu Pinyin: Yáng Jiànhóu
- Wade–Giles: Yang Chien-hou

Yang Jianhou (1839–1917), or Yang Chien-hou, was the younger son of the founder of Yang-style tai chi Yang Luchan, and a well known teacher of the soft style martial art of tai chi. Yang's older brother, Yang Banhou, was the senior of Jianhou's generation, and also an important tai chi instructor. Jianhou's sons Yang Chengfu and Yang Shaohou were also famous teachers of tai chi.
