= Yang Banhou =

Chinese tai chi martial artist

Yang Banhou 楊班侯
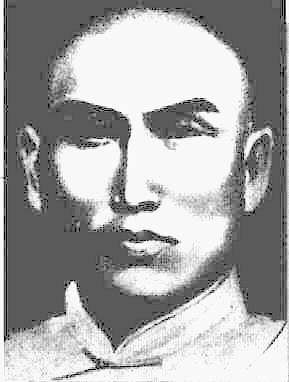
- Eldest son of Grandmaster Yang Luchan
- Born: 1837; Guangfu, Yongnian, Hebei, China
- Died: 1890 (aged 52–53)
- Style: Yang-style tai chi

Other information
- Notable students: Yang Shaohou; Wu Quanyou; Wang Jiaoyu (王矯宇)

Yang Banhou
- Traditional Chinese: 楊班侯
- Simplified Chinese: 杨班侯
Transcriptions
Standard Mandarin
- Hanyu Pinyin: Yáng Bānhóu
- Wade–Giles: Yang Pan-hou

Yang Banhou (Yang Pan-hou; 1837–1890) was an influential teacher of tai chi in Qing dynasty China, known for his bellicose temperament.

== Biography ==
He was the eldest son of Yang Luchan to survive to adulthood. Like his father, he was retained as a martial arts instructor by the Manchu imperial family. His disciple Wu Quanyou, a Manchu banner cavalry officer of the Palace Battalion, and Wu Quanyou's son Wu Jianquan, also a banner officer, became co-founders of Wu-style tai chi.

Yang Banhou's younger brother Yang Jianhou was a well known teacher of Yang-style tai chi as well. Banhou adopted Jianhou's eldest son, Yang Shaohou, and put him through rigorous training. Yang Banhou's son Yang Shaopeng (1875–1938) was also a tai chi teacher.

Yang Banhou taught Wang Jiaoyu his father's Guang Ping Yang tai chi form, and Wang taught Kuo Lien-ying this original Yang style form.
