= Wang Zongyue =

王宗岳 Wang Zongyue
- Born: China
- Nationality: Chinese
- Style: Tai chi

Other information
- Notable students: Chen Wangting

Wang Zongyue
- Chinese: 王宗岳
Transcriptions
Standard Mandarin
- Hanyu Pinyin: Wáng Zōngyuè

Wang Zongyue was a legendary figure in the history of Chinese martial art tai chi. In some writings, Wang is supposed to have been a student of the equally legendary Zhang Sanfeng, a 13th-century Taoist monk credited with devising neijia in general and tai chi in particular.

Wang is said to have resided in Taigu, Shanxi in the middle of the 15th Century. He learned an early form of tai chi in the Jingtai Taoist Temple in Baoji. Two of Wang's supposed disciples, Chen Wangting and Jiang Fa, went on to make important contributions to the development of modern tai chi.

Wang is reputed to have authored The Tai Chi Treatise, alleged by the Wu brothers to have been found in Beijing as part of the Salt Shop Manuals in the mid 19th century. This treatise records many tai chi proverbs; among them: "four ounces deflect one thousand pounds" and "a feather cannot be added; nor can a fly alight". The Tai Chi Treatise is among a body of literature collectively referred to as the tai chi classics.

== The Thirteen Dynamic Solo Set ==
The Thirteen Dynamic Solo Set (十三勢架) is listed in Wang Zongyue's The Tai Chi Treatise as manual handwritten by Li Yiyu, presented to his student, Hao He (Weizhen) in 1881. The Solo Set is as follows:

1. 懶扎衣 - LAZILY PULLING BACK THE ROBE
2. 單鞭 - SINGLE WHIP
3. 提手上勢 - RAISE THE HAND
4. 白鵝亮翅 - WHITE GOOSE SHOWS ITS WINGS
5. 摟膝抝步 - BRUSH PAST YOUR KNEE IN A CROSSED STANCE
6. 手揮琵琶勢 - PLAY THE LUTE
7. 摟膝抝步 - BRUSH PAST YOUR KNEE IN A CROSSED STANCE
8. 手揮琵琶勢 - PLAY THE LUTE
9. 上步搬攬垂 - STEP FORWARD, PARRY, TAKE IN, PUNCH
10. 如封似閉 - SEALING SHUT
11. 抱虎推山 - CAPTURE THE TIGER AND PUSH IT BACK TO ITS MOUNTAIN
12. 單鞭 - SINGLE WHIP
13. 肘底看垂 -GUARDING PUNCH UNDER THE ELBOW
14. 倒輦猴 - TURN AROUND TO DRIVE AWAY THE MONKEY
15. 白鵝亮翅 - WHITE GOOSE SHOWS ITS WINGS
16. 摟膝抝步 - BRUSH PAST YOUR KNEE IN A CROSSED STANCE
17. 三甬背 - THREE THROUGH THE BACK
18. 單鞭 - SINGLE WHIP
19. 紜手 - TANGLING HANDS
20. 高探馬 - RISING UP AND REACHING OUT TO THE HORSE
21. 左右起脚 - LIFTING KICK TO BOTH SIDES
22. 轉身踢一脚 - TURN AROUND, SNAPPING KICK
23. 踐步打垂 - STEP SUCCESSIVELY, PUNCH
24. 翻身二起 - TURN AROUND, DOUBLE KICK
25. 披身 - DRAPE THE BODY
26. 踢一脚 - SNAPPING KICK
27. 蹬一脚 - PRESSING KICK
28. 上步搬攬垂 - STEP FORWARD, PARRY, TAKE IN, PUNCH
29. 如封似閉 - SEALING SHUT
30. 抱虎推山 - CAPTURE THE TIGER AND PUSH IT BACK TO ITS MOUNTAIN
31. 斜單鞭 - DIAGONAL SINGLE WHIP
32. 野馬分鬃 - WILD HORSE SENDS ITS MANE SIDE TO SIDE
33. 單鞭 - SINGLE WHIP
34. 玉女穿梭 - MAIDEN SENDS THE SHUTTLE THROUGH
35. 單鞭 - SINGLE WHIP
36. 紜手下勢 - TANGLING HANDS, LOWERING
37. 更鷄獨立 - ROOSTER STANDS ON ONE LEG
38. 倒輦猴 - TURN AROUND TO DRIVE AWAY THE MONKEY
39. 白鵝亮翅 - WHITE GOOSE SHOWS ITS WINGS
40. 摟膝抝步 - BRUSH PAST YOUR KNEE IN A CROSSED STANCE
41. 三甬背 - THREE THROUGH THE BACK
42. 單鞭 - SINGLE WHIP
43. 紜手 - TANGLING HANDS
44. 高探馬 - RISING UP AND REACHING OUT TO THE HORSE
45. 十字擺連 - CROSSED-BODY SWINGING LOTUS KICK
46. 上步指襠捶 - STEP FORWARD, PUNCH TO THE CROTCH
47. 單鞭 - SINGLE WHIP
48. 上步七星 - STEP FORWARD, BIG-DIPPER POSTURE
49. 下步跨虎 - STEP BACK, SITTING-TIGER POSTURE
50. 轉脚擺連 - REVOLVING-BASE SWINGING LOTUS KICK
51. 彎弓射虎 - BEND THE BOW TO SHOOT THE TIGER
52. 雙抱垂 - DOUBLE PUNCH
53. 手揮琵琶勢 - PLAY THE LUTE

This form is identical Wu Yuxiang's form as listed in his own writing, 武式太極拳 (Wu Yuxiang Style Taiji Boxing). Wang Zongyue's The Thirteen Dynamic Solo Set and Wu Yuxiang's form are identical.

== Tai chi lineage tree ==
Note:

- This lineage tree is not comprehensive, but depicts those considered the "gate-keepers" and most recognised individuals in each generation of the respective styles.
- Although many styles were passed down to respective descendants of the same family, the lineage focused on is that of the martial art and its main styles, not necessarily that of the families.
- Each (coloured) style depicted below has a lineage tree on its respective article page that is focused on that specific style, showing a greater insight into the highly significant individuals in its lineage.
- Names denoted by an asterisk are legendary or semi-legendary figures in the lineage; while their involvement in the lineage is accepted by most of the major schools, it is not independently verifiable from known historical records.

Key:
Solid lines	Direct teacher-student.	Zhang Sanfeng* c. 12th century NEIJIA
Dashed lines	Individual(s) omitted.	Various Taoists	Legendary figures
Dotted lines	Partial influence /taught informally /limited time.	Wang Zongyue*; TAI CHI
Dashed cross	Branch continues.
Chen Wangting; 1580–1660; CHEN-STYLE	(蒋法); Jiang Fa; Zhaobao-style
(陈汝信); Chen Ruxin; 2nd gen. Chen	(陈所乐); Chen Suole; 2nd gen. Chen	(邢喜怀); Xing Xihuai; 2nd gen. Zhaobao
(陈大鹍); Chen Dakun; 3rd gen. Chen	(陈大鹏); Chen Dapeng; 3rd gen. Chen	(陈光印); Chen Guangyin; 3rd gen. Chen	(陈申如); Chen Shenru; 3rd gen. Chen	(陈恂如); Chen Xunru; 3rd gen. Chen	(陈正如); Chen Zhengru; 3rd gen. Chen	(张楚臣); Zhang Chuchen; 3rd gen. Zhaobao
(陈善通); Chen Shantong; 4th gen. Chen	(陈善志); Chen Shanzhi; 4th gen. Chen	(陈继夏); Chen Jixia; 4th gen. Chen	(陈节); Chen Jie; 4th gen. Chen	(陈敬伯); Chen Jingbo; 4th gen. Chen; 4th gen. Zhaobao
(陈秉奇); Chen Bingqi; 5th gen. Chen	(陈秉壬); Chen Bingren; 5th gen. Chen	(陈秉旺); Chen Bingwang; 1748–? 5th gen. Chen	(陈公兆); Chen Gongzhao; 1715– after 1795; 5th gen. Chen	Zhang Zongyu; 5th gen. Zhaobao
Chen Changxing; 1771–1853; 6th gen. Chen; Chen Old Frame	Chen Youben c. 19th century 6th gen. Chen; Chen Small Frame	(张彦); Zhang Yan; 6th gen. Zhaobao
(陈耕耘); Chen Gengyun; 7th gen. Chen	(陈仲甡); Chen Zhongshen; 1809–1871; 7th gen. Chen; Chen Small Frame	Yang Luchan; 1799–1872; YANG-STYLE; Guang Ping Yang; Yangjia Michuan	Chen Qingping; 1795–1868; 7th gen. Chen; 7th gen. Zhaobao
Chen Yanxi; 8th gen. Chen	(陈鑫); Chen Xin; 1849–1929; 8th gen. Chen; Chen Small Frame	(王兰亭); Wang Lanting; 1840–? 2nd gen. Yang	Yang Jianhou; 1839–1917; 2nd gen. Yang; 2nd gen. Yangjia Michuan	Yang Banhou; 1837–1892; 2nd gen. Yang; 2nd gen. Guang Ping Yang; Yang Small Frame	Wu Yuxiang; 1812–1880; WU (HAO)-STYLE	(和招远); He Zhaoyuan; 1810–1890; 8th gen. Zhaobao; Zhaobao He-style
Chen Fake; 1887–1957; 9th gen. Chen; Chen New Frame	(陈克忠); Chen Kezhong; 1908–1966; 9th gen. Chen; Chen Small Frame	(李瑞东); Li Ruidong; 1851–1917; Li-style	Yang Chengfu; 1883–1936; 3rd gen. Yang; Yang Big Frame	Yang Shaohou; 1862–1930; 3rd gen. Yang; Yang Small Frame	Wu Quanyou; 1834–1902; 1st gen. Wu	(王矯宇); Wang Jiaoyu; 1836–1939; 3rd gen. Guang Ping Yang	(李亦畬); Li Yiyu; 1832–1892; 2nd gen. Wu (Hao)	(和庆喜); He Qingxi; 1857–1936; 9th gen. Zhaobao
(陈照丕); Chen Zhaopi; 1893–1972; 10th gen. Chen focused on Chen Old Frame	(陈照奎); Chen Zhaokui; 1928–1981; 10th gen. Chen focused on Chen New Frame	(陈伯祥); Chen Boxiang b. 1944; 10th gen. Chen; Chen Small Frame	Zhang Qinlin; 1888–1967; 3rd gen. Yangjia Michuan	Yang Zhenduo; 1926–2020; 4th gen. Yang	Fu Zhongwen; 1903–1994; 4th gen. Yang; Beijing (24) form	Cheng Man-ch'ing; 1902–1975; 4th gen. Yang; Short (37) Form	Wu Jianquan; 1870–1942; 2nd gen. Wu; WU-STYLE; 108 Form	Kuo Lien Ying; 1895–1984; 4th gen. Guang Ping Yang	Hao Weizhen; 1849–1920; 3rd gen. Wu (Hao)	(郑悟清); Zheng Wuqing; 1895–1984; 10th gen. Zhaobao
Wu Gongyi; 1900–1970; 3rd gen. Wu	Sun Lutang; 1861–1932; SUN-STYLE	(郝月如); Hao Yueru; 1877–1935; 4th gen. Wu (Hao)	(宋蕴华); Song Yunhua; 1949-2006; 11th gen. Zhaobao
(王延年); Wang Yannian; 1914–2008; 5th gen. Yang; 4th gen. Yangjia Michuan	Cheng Tin Hung; 1930–2005; Wudang-style	Wu Yanxia; 1930–2001; 4th gen. Wu	(孙剑云); Sun Jianyun; 1913–2003; 2nd gen. Sun	(郝少如); Hao Shaoru; 1908–1983; 5th gen. Wu (Hao)
Chen Xiaowang b. 1945; 11th gen. Chen	(陈小星); Chen Xiaoxing b. 1952; 11th gen. Chen	(陆志众); Lu Zhizhong b. 1965; 11th gen. Chen; Chen Small Frame	Yang Jun b. 1968; 5th gen. Yang	Wu Kuang-yu b. 1946; 5th gen. Wu	(孙永田); Sun Yongtian b. ? 3rd gen. Sun	(刘积顺); Liu Jishun b. 1930; 6th gen. Wu (Hao)
CHEN-STYLE	Chen Small Frame	YANG-STYLE	WU-STYLE	SUN-STYLE	WU (HAO)-STYLE

== Connection to Karate ==
Some Karate scholars theorize about the legendary Chinese master known in Okinawa as Kushanku, being in fact Wang Zongyue

== See also ==
- Doc Fai-Wong; Hallander, Jane Tai Chi Chuan's Internal Secrets (1991) Unique Publications . ISBN 978-0-86568-147-7
- Yang Jwing-Ming Tai Chi Secrets of the Yang Style: Chinese Classics, Translations, Commentary (2001) YMAA Publication Center. ISBN 978-1-886969-09-4
- Zhang Yun The Taijiquan Classics (2016) Yin Cheng Gong Fa Association North American Headquarters. ISBN 978-0-578-17886-8
