= Greg Hatza =

American jazz organist (born 1948)

Greg Hatza is an American jazz organist and church musician born in 1948 in Reading, Pennsylvania.

== Music ==
Hatza started on piano at age five, and switched to organ at age fifteen. He played professionally from age sixteen, working for four years at Lenny Moore's club. He recorded two albums for Coral Records in the late 1960s with guitarist Eric Gale and drummer Grady Tate, then switched to electric keyboards in the 1970s as the organ's popularity waned. From 1974 to 1984, he studied tabla under Ustad Hamid Hossain. He later performed ragas on piano, in concert with Hamid, in the U.S., India, and Bangladesh. He returned to playing the organ in the 1990s after hearing Joey DeFrancesco, and recorded again as a leader with his ensemble, the Greg Hatza ORGANization. In 1996, he began to study Chinese classical music on the erhu, a two-stringed Chinese fiddle, under Shanghai instructor, Liang Shan Tang.

He has served as the choir director and minister of music at St. Gregory the Great Catholic Church in Baltimore.

== Martial arts ==
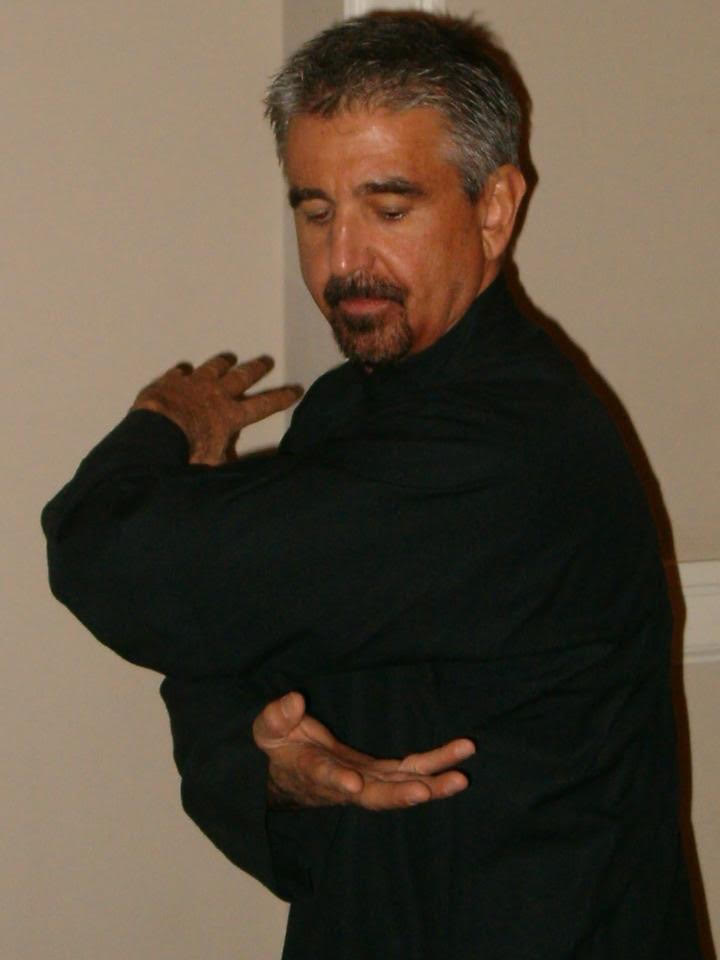

Hatza is an instructor of Qiangshan baguazhang, xingyiquan, and tai chi at the Chinese Boxing Academy in Catonsville, Maryland. He has over forty years of martial arts experience, including Shotokan, Shaolin kung fu, Snow Tiger, Yang-style tai chi, xingyiquan, and baguazhang (bagua).

He began his study of bagua in 1985 under Sifu Ken Fish. In 1990, he met Sifu Pak Bok Nam and has continued his studies in bagua under his tutelage. In 1999, he became a lineage disciple and licensed instructor of the Qiangshan bagua system. He also teaches tai chi. He has attended seminars with Yang Zhenduo to continue his refinement of the Yang-style long form and taijijian.

== Discography ==
Greg Hatza ORGANization Recordings

- The Wizardry of Greg Hatza (Coral, 1967)
- Organized Jazz (Coral, 1968) with Eric Gale, Grady Tate
- The Greg Hatza ORGANization (Palmetto, 1993)
- In My Pocket (Palmetto, 1996)
- Snake Eyes (Palmetto, 1998)
- To A New Place (I-Ching, 2001)
- Diggin' Up My Roots (Flip, 2016)

Moon August Recordings

- Just Another Gig (Bushido, 1979)
- Feelin' Free (Bushido, 1983)
- Potion (Syntax, 1989)
- Hard Times (Aim, 1992)
- Best of Moon August (Special Edition) (Ashley, 1999)
