= Chen Qingping =

Chinese Tai Chi Chuan practitioner

Chen Qingping 陳清平
- Born: 1795; Chenjiagou, Henan, China
- Died: 1868 (aged 72–73)
- Nationality: Chinese
- Style: Chen-style tai chi (7th gen. Chen-style); Zhaobao tai chi (7th gen. Zhaobao-style)

Other information
- Notable relatives: Chen Youben, Chen Changxing, Chen Wangting
- Notable students: Wu Yuxiang

Chen Qingping
- Chinese: 陳清平
Transcriptions
Standard Mandarin
- Hanyu Pinyin: Chén Qīngpíng
- Wade–Giles: Ch'en Ch'ing-p'ing

Chen Qingping or Ch'en Ch'ing-p'ing (1795–1868) was a 15th generation descendant and 7th generation master of the Chen family tai chi, which he learned from Chen Youben, and the 7th generation successor of the Zhaobao style of tai chi, which he learned from Zhang Yan. He was an influential martial artist and teacher of tai chi.

Chen Qingping was married to a woman from the Zhaobao village, only a few miles north east of the Chen Village (Chenjiagou) — the home of the Chen Family famous for their martial arts.

Chen Qingping's main disciple He Zhaoyuan passed on this art which later developed into He-style tai chi. Other disciples, such as Li Zuozhi (created Tengnuojia), and Li Jingyan (created the Hulei-style tai chi), created their own styles by combining their arts with other martial arts popular in the local area where they lived.

Chen Qingping also taught Wu Yuxiang, who later developed the Wu (Hao)-style tai chi, sometimes referred to as the "Scholar-style of tai chi". Wu Yuxiang went to Chen Village to learn from Yang Luchan's master, Chen Changxing, who recommended him to Chen Qingping.

== Tai chi lineage tree with Zhaobao focus ==
Note:

- This lineage tree is not comprehensive, but depicts those considered the 'gate-keepers' & most recognised individuals in each generation of Zhaobao.
- Although many styles were passed down to respective descendants of the same family, the lineage focused on is that of Zhaobao & not necessarily that of a family.
- Names denoted by an asterisk are legendary or semi-legendary figures in the lineage; while their involvement in the lineage is accepted by most of the major schools, it is not independently verifiable from known historical records.

Key:	NEIJIA
Solid lines	Direct teacher-student.
Dot lines	Partial influence /taught informally /limited time.	Wang Zongyue*; TAI CHI
Dash lines	Individual(s) omitted.
Dash cross	Branch continues.
CHEN-STYLE	(蒋法); Jiang Fa; Zhaobao-style
(邢喜怀); Xing Xihuai; 2nd gen. Zhaobao
(陈正如); Chen Zhengru; 3rd gen. Chen	(张楚臣); Zhang Chuchen; 3rd gen. Zhaobao
(陈敬伯); Chen Jingbo; 4th gen. Chen; 4th gen. Zhaobao
Zhang Zongyu; 5th gen. Zhaobao
Chen Youben c. 19th century 6th gen. Chen; Chen Small Frame	(张彦); Zhang Yan; 6th gen. Zhaobao
YANG-STYLE	(陈清萍); Chen Qingping; 1795–1868; 7th gen. Chen; 7th gen. Zhaobao
Wu Yuxiang; 1812–1880; WU (HAO)-STYLE	(他招远); He Zhaoyuan; 1810–1890; 8th gen. Zhaobao; Zhaobao He-style
Li-style	(和庆喜); He Qingxi; 1857–1936; 9th gen. Zhaobao
WU-STYLE	SUN-STYLE
(宋蕴华); Song Yunhua; 1949–2006; 11th gen. Zhaobao
Wudang-style
CHEN-STYLE	YANG-STYLE	WU-STYLE	SUN-STYLE	WU (HAO)-STYLE
