= Wu-style tai chi fast form =

Wu-style tai chi fast form is a suite of fast forms publicized in Wu-style T'ai chi Fast Form.

== Shanghai Wu-style forms ==
Empty hand or fist form list published in Ma Yueliang's, Wu Yinghua's, and Shi Mei Lin's Wu-style T'ai chi Fast Form. (Note: Traditionally, this set consists of 108 forms. For transcribing purposes, some of the repeated forms are given one reference number in both the Chinese and English versions of the Wu-style Fast Form book.)

1. Yù Bèi Shì, Preparation**: Stand still, focusing the mind and body for the practice ahead.
2. Tài Jí Chū Shǒu, Beginning of the Form**: Gently lift the hands to shoulder height, signifying the start of the form.
3. Lăn Què Wěi, Grasp the bird's tail**: Perform a series of movements involving warding off, rolling back, pressing, and pushing.
4. Dān Biān, Single whip**: Extend one arm to the side while forming a hook with the other, mimicking a whip.
5. Tí Shŏu Shàng Shì, Raise hand and step up**: Raise one hand while stepping forward, maintaining balance.
6. Bái Hè Lìang Chì, White crane flaps its wings**: Spread the arms wide, resembling a crane flapping its wings.
7. Lóu Xī Ào Bù, Brush knee, twist step (1)**: Brush the knee with one hand while stepping forward with a twisting motion.
8. Brush knee, twist step (2)**: Repeat the previous move, emphasizing fluidity and coordination.
9. Brush knee, twist step (3)**: Continue the sequence with another brush knee and twist step.
10. Brush knee, twist step (4)**: Complete the series with a final brush knee and twist step.
11. Shŏu Huī Pí Pa, Hand strums the lute**: Position the hands as if playing a lute, balancing and preparing for the next move.
12. Jìn Bù Bān Lán Chuí, Step up, diverting and blocking fist**: Step forward while diverting and blocking an imaginary opponent's punch.
13. Rú Fēng Sì Bì, As if closing up**: Bring the hands together in front of the body, as if closing a book.
14. Bào Hŭ Tuī Shān, Tiger and leopard spring to the mountain**: Extend the arms forward forcefully, imitating a tiger or leopard's leap.
15. Shí Zi Shŏu, The cross hands**: Cross the hands in front of the body, symbolizing defense.
16. Xié Lóu Xī Ào Bù, Oblique brush knee, twist step**: Perform a brush knee and twist step at an angle.# Fān Shēn Xié Lóu Xī Ào Bù, Turn body, oblique brush knee, twist step**: Turn the body and execute an oblique brush knee and twist step.
17. Lăn Què Wěi, Grasping the bird's tail**: Repeat the series of ward off, rollback, press, and push.
18. Xié Dān Biān, Oblique single whip**: Execute a single whip movement at an oblique angle.
19. Zhŏu Dĭ Kàn Chuí, One fist under the elbow, one fist visible**: Position one fist under the elbow, with the other visible.
20. Dào Niăn Hóu, Step back and repulse the monkey**: Step backward while pushing the hands forward, repelling an opponent.
21. Xié Fēi Shì, Flying oblique**: Move the body in an oblique direction, mimicking flight.
22. Tí Shŏu Shàng Shì, Raise hands and step up**: Repeat the movement of raising hands and stepping up.
23. Bái Hè Lìang Chì, White crane flaps its wings**: Once again, spread the arms wide like a crane.
24. Lóu Xī Ào Bù, Brush knee and twist step**: Perform the familiar brush knee and twist step.
25. Hăi Dĭ Zhēn, Needle at the sea bottom**: Lower one hand towards the ground as if reaching for a needle at the bottom of the sea.
26. Shàn Tōng Bèi, Fan through the back**: Sweep the arms in a wide arc, as if fanning through the back.
27. Fān Shēn Piē Shēn Chuí, Turn body, parry and punch**: Turn the body while parrying an attack and delivering a punch.
28. Xié Bù Bān Lán Chuí, Step back, diverting and blocking punch**: Step back while diverting and blocking a punch.
29. Shàng Bù Lăn Què Wěi, Step up, grasping the bird's tail**: Step forward while performing the grasp bird’s tail sequence.
30. Yún Shŏu (yī), Cloud hands (1)**: Move the hands in a circular, flowing motion resembling clouds.
31. Yún Shŏu (èr), Cloud hands (2)**: Continue the cloud hands movement with a second set.
32. Gāo Tàn Mă, High pat on horse**: Raise one hand to pat an imaginary horse high up.
33. Pī Shēn Tī Jiǎo (yī), Open body and kick (1)**: Open the body and execute a kick.
34. Pī Shēn Tī Jiǎo (èr), Open body and kick (2)**: Repeat the open body and kick movement.
35. Zhuăn Shēn Dēng Jiăo, Turn body, pedaling foot**: Turn the body and perform a pedaling foot motion.
36. Jìn Bù Zāi Chuí, Step up, planting punch**: Step forward and deliver a punch as if planting it firmly.
37. Fān Shēn Piē Shēn Chuí, Turn body, parry and punch**: Turn the body, parry, and punch.
38. Fān Shēn Èr Qǐ Jiăo, Double kicking, turn the body**: Perform a double kick while turning the body.
39. Tuì Bù Dă Hŭ, Retreat step, beat the tiger**: Step back and make a striking motion as if beating a tiger.
40. Yòu Dēng Jiăo, Right parting leg**: Extend the right leg outward in a parting motion.
41. Shuāng Fēng Guàn Ĕr, Strike the ears with both fists**: Strike with both fists aimed at ear height.
42. Pī Shēn Tī Jiăo, Open body, kick**: Open the body and kick.
43. Zhuǎn Shēn Dēng Jiăo, Turn body, pedaling foot**: Turn the body and perform a pedaling foot action.
44. Shàng Bù Bān Lán Chuí, Step up, diverting and blocking fist**: Step up, divert, and block a fist.
45. Rú Fēng Sì Bì, As if closing up**: Bring the hands together in a closing motion.
46. Bào Hŭ Tuī Shān, Tiger and leopard spring to the mountain**: Leap forward with arms extended like a tiger or leopard.
47. Shí Zi Shŏu, The cross hands**: Cross the hands defensively in front of the body.
48. Xié Lóu Xī Ào Bù, Oblique brush knee, twist step**: Perform an oblique brush knee and twist step.
49. Fān Shēn Xié Lóu Xī Ào Bù, Turn body, oblique brush knee, twist step**: Turn the body and execute an oblique brush knee and twist step.
50. Lăn Què Wěi, Grasping the bird's tail**: Repeat the sequence of ward off, rollback, press, and push.
51. Xié Dān Biān, Oblique single whip**: Perform a single whip movement at an oblique angle.
52. Yí Mă Fēn Zōng, Parting wild horse's mane (1)**: Separate the arms as if parting the mane of a wild horse.
53. Parting wild horse's mane (2)**: Repeat the parting wild horse’s mane movement.
54. Parting wild horse's mane (3)**: Perform the parting wild horse’s mane movement for the third time.
55. Yù Nü Chuān Suō, Jade girl works the shuttles (1)**: Move the hands as if weaving, resembling a jade girl working the shuttles.
56. Jade girl works the shuttles (2)**: Continue the weaving motion.
57. Yí Mă Fēn Zōng, Parting the wild horse's mane**: Execute the parting wild horse’s mane movement again.
58. Yù Nü Chuān Suō, Jade girl works the shuttles (3)**: Continue the jade girl working the shuttles movement.
59. Jade girl works the shuttles (4)**: Complete the series of shuttling movements.
60. Lăn Què Wěi, Grasping the bird's tail**: Perform the grasp bird’s tail sequence.
61. Yún Shŏu, Cloud hands**: Move the hands in a circular, cloud-like motion.
62. Xià Shì, Downward posture**: Lower the body into a downward stance.
63. Jīn Jī Dú Lì, Golden cockerel stands on one leg (1)**: Balance on one leg, resembling a golden cockerel.
64. Golden cockerel stands on one leg (2)**: Repeat the golden cockerel stance on the other leg.
65. Dào Niăn Hóu, Step back, repulse the monkey**: Step backward and push the hands forward to repulse an opponent.
66. Xié Fēi Shì, Flying oblique**: Move in an oblique direction, mimicking flight.
67. Tí Shŏu Shàng Shì, Raise hand and step up**: Raise one hand and step forward.
68. Bái Hè Lìang Chì, White crane flaps its wings**: Spread the arms wide like a crane.
69. Lóu Xī Ào Bù, Brush knee and twist step**: Perform the brush knee and twist step.
70. Hăi Dĭ Zhēn, Needle at the bottom of the sea**: Lower one hand towards the ground.
71. Shàn Tōng Bèi, Fan through the back**: Sweep the arms in a wide arc, fanning through the back.
72. Piē Shēn Chuí, Turn body, parry and punch**: Turn the body, parry, and punch.
73. Shàng Bù Bān Lán Chuí, Step up, diverting and blocking punch**: Step forward, divert, and block a punch.
74. Lăn Què Wěi, Grasping the bird's tail**: Repeat the grasp bird’s tail sequence.
75. Yún Shŏu, Cloud hands**: Perform the flowing, cloud-like hand movements.
76. Gāo Tàn Mă, High pat the horse**: Raise one hand high to pat an imaginary horse.
77. Yíng Miàn Zhăng, Palm goes to meet the face**: Move the palm forward to meet the face.
78. Shí Zi Băi Lián, Turn body, cross swing lotus**: Turn the body and make a cross swinging motion.
79. Lóu Xī Ào Bù, Brush knee, twist step**: Perform the brush knee and twist step.
80. Zhĭ Dāng Chuí, Punch to groin**: Execute a punch aimed at the groin level.
81. Lăn Què Wěi, Grasping the bird's tail**: Repeat the sequence of ward off, rollback, press, and push.
82. Xià Shì, Downward posture**: Lower the body into a downward stance.
83. Shàng Bù Qī Xīng, Step up to form seven stars**: Step forward and position the hands to form the seven stars.
84. Tuì Bù Kuà Hŭ, Retreat step, ride the tiger**: Step back and position the arms as if riding a tiger.
85. Zhuăn Shēn Pū Miàn Zhăng, Turn body, palm meets face**: Turn the body and move the palm to meet the face.
86. Fān Shēn Shuāng Băi Lián, Turn body, double lotus swing**: Turn the body and perform a double lotus swing.
87. Wān Gōng Shè Hŭ, Draw bow, shoot the tiger**: Mimic drawing a bow and shooting a tiger.
88. Shàng Bù Cuō Chuí, Step up and pound down**: Step forward and pound down with a fist.
89. Yíng Miàn Zhăng, Palm goes to meet the face**: Move the palm forward to meet the face.
90. Fān Shēn Piē Shēn Chuí, Turn body, parry and punch**: Turn the body, parry, and punch.
91. Jìn Bù Lăn Què Wěi, Step up, grasping the bird's tail**: Step forward and repeat the grasp bird’s tail sequence.
92. Dān Biān, Like single whip**: Perform the single whip movement.
93. Hé Tài Jí, Closing T'ai Chi**: Conclude the form by bringing the hands back to the starting position and relaxing the body.

== History ==
In 1914, Xu Yusheng established the Athletic Research Institute in Beijing and Invited Yang Shaohou, Yang Chengfu, and Wu Jianquan to teach. From then on, tai chi was taught to the public, changing the ancient closed-door policy where tai chi was only taught privately to people within a limited circle following the tutor-disciple relationship.

Grand Master Wu Jianquan enriched the art of tai chi handed down from his father, Wu Quanyou. His development of the slow set led to the creation of the style of tai chi that became known as Wu-style tai chi. He omitted some of the repetitions, fa jin (發勁), stamping, and jumping movements to make the form smoother, and more structured with continuous movements. This form promoted tai chi's health aspects and was more suitable for general practitioners though it still included the martial applications.

Yang Chengfu also modified his own Yang-style tai chi in a similar way at the same time. His brother Yang Shouhou's form had a high frame with lively steps alternating between fast and slow movements with hard, crisp fa-jin. Chen Panling, who was a student of Yang Shaohou and Wu Jianquan, described tai chi form practice as beginning with slow movement changing to fast and returning to slow movement. He points out learning to exercise rapid movement in the form and training from soft to hard and hard to soft movements.

The Shanghai Wu-style Fast Form kept the original fajin (release of power), jumping, attacking, and stamping movements. This advanced form was not originally taught openly.

In December 1982, a martial arts meeting held in Beijing was held to foster the traditional martial arts. Wu Yinghua and Ma Yueliang of The Shanghai Jianquan Taijiquan Association disclosed the original Wu-style Fast Set for the first time to the public. In 1983, their adopted daughter Shi Mei Lin demonstrated the Wu-style tai chi fast form at the All China Traditional Martial Arts competition in Nanchang where she received the Award of Excellence.

== Slow forms ==
The slow-motion solo form training sequences of tai chi are its best-known manifestations. In English, they are usually called the hand form or just the form. In Mandarin, it is usually called quan (Chinese: 拳; pinyin: quán; Wade–Giles: ch'üan²). They are performed slowly by beginners and are said to promote concentration, condition the body, and acquaint students with the motion techniques for more advanced training. Solo weapons forms, as well as much shorter and repetitive sequences to train power generation leverages as a form of qigong (ch'i kung) are included. Wu-style pushing hands forms include two-person drill routines, which fulfil some of the same functions as power generation drills.

== Other Wu-style fast forms ==
The Wu family's Hong Kong branch teaches a somewhat different fast form.

== See also ==
- 108-form Wu family tai chi chuan

== Literature ==
- Wu Yinghua, Ma Yueliang, Shi Mei Lin (1987). Wu-style T'ai chi Fast Form. Henan Science Skills Ltd. Henan (only available in Chinese) ISBN 7-5349-0121-9/G122.
- Wu Yinghua, Ma Yueliang, Shi Mei Lin (1991). Wu-style T'ai chi Fast Form. Shanghai Book Co Ltd, Hong Kong (only available in Chinese) . ISBN 962-239-106-0.
- Wu Yinghua, Ma Yueliang(1991). Wu Style Tai Chi Chuan Forms, Concepts and Application of the Original Style. Shanghai Book Co Ltd, Hong Kong. ISBN 962-239-103-6.
- Ma Yueliang & Zee Wen(1986, 1990, 1995). Wu Style Tai Chi Chuan Push Hands. Shanghai Book Co Ltd, Hong Kong. ISBN 962-239-100-1.
- Dr Wen Zee (2002) Wu Style Tai Chi Chuan, Ancient Chinese way to health. North Atlantic Books. ISBN 1-55643-389-1.
- Chen Pan Ling (1963, 1998) Chen Pan-Ling's Original Tai Chi Chuan Textbook. Blitz ISBN 0-9660240-3-6.
- Fu Zhong Wen (1963, 1999) Mastering Yang Style Taijiquan, Translated by Louis Swaim. North Atlantic Books ISBN 1-55643-318-2.
