= 24-form tai chi =

Short version of tai chi

The 24-posture Simplified Form of tai chi, sometimes called the Beijing form due to its place of origin, is a shortened and modified sequence of movements based on traditional tai chi, developed by a group of tai chi masters organized by a government committee in the People's Republic of China with the goal of creating an exercise routine for the general public.

== History ==
In 1956 the Chinese Sports Committee of the People's Republic of China gathered a group of five tai chi masters in Beijing to create a simplified form that the general public could practice to improve health and well-being. The group included Chu Guiting, Cai Longyun (zh:蔡龙云), Fu Zhongwen, and Zhang Yu (張玉), and was led by Li Tianji (zh:李天骥), coach of the China national wushu team and executive member of the China National Institute of Physical Education and Sport. The routine they created, sometimes known as the "Beijing form," has been actively promoted by the Chinese government and has become one of the most popular tai chi forms worldwide.

== Characteristics ==
Based on traditional Yang-style tai chi, the simplified form contains 24 unique movements and requires about six minutes to perform, offering an introduction to the essential elements of tai chi. The sequence retains many movements from the longer traditional form but with the most difficult movements removed, no movements repeated, and other modifications to ease an introduction to the practice while exercising the left and right sides of the body evenly.

The 24-posture form is a self-contained exercise, but can also serve as a foundation for students wishing to progress further in tai chi. They may then be introduced to the 48-posture form or its successor the 42-posture competition form (which include movements from four tai chi styles), as well as traditional forms such as the Yang-style long form and the long forms from other styles, other simplified and competition forms, advanced forms, weapons forms like tai chi sword, and partner work including pushing hands and applications.

== Postures ==
Sequence of the 24-posture Simplified Tai Chi Form

1. Commencing (Qǐshì, 起势)
2. Wild Horse Parts Mane, Left and Right (Zuǒyòu Yěmǎ Fēnzōng, 左右野马分鬃)
3. White Crane Spreads Its Wings (Báihè Lìangchì, 白鹤亮翅)
4. Brush Knee and Step Forward, Left and Right (Zuǒyòu Lōuxī Àobù, 左右搂膝拗步),
5. Present the Pipa (Shǒuhūi Pípá, 手挥琵琶)
6. Reverse Reeling Forearm (Zuǒyòu Dào Juǎn Gōng, 左右倒卷肱),
  1. Step Back and Repulse Monkey, Left (Zuǒ Dǎo Niǎn Hóu 左倒攆猴)
  2. Step Back and Repulse Monkey, Right (Yòu Dǎo Niǎn Hóu 右倒攆猴)
7. Left Grasp Sparrow's Tail (Zuǒ Lǎn Quèwěi, 左揽雀尾)
  1. Ward Off (Péng, 掤) (Note: 掤 is pronounced "péng" when the meaning is "ward off". This originated with tai chi. An older prouniciation, "bīng", means "arrow quiver cover".)
  2. Rollback (Lǚ, 捋)
  3. Press (Jǐ, 擠)
  4. Push (Àn, 按)
8. Right Grasp Sparrow's Tail (Yòu Lǎn Quèwěi, 右揽雀尾)
  1. Ward Off (Péng 掤)
  2. Rollback (Lǚ, 捋)
  3. Press (Jǐ, 擠)
  4. Push (Àn, 按)
9. Single Whip (Dān Biān, 单鞭)
10. Cloud Hands (Yúnshǒu, 云手)
11. Single Whip (Dān Biān, 单鞭)
12. High Pat on Horse (Gāo Tàn Mǎ, 高探马)
13. Right Heel Kick (Yòu Dēng Jiǎo, 右蹬脚)
14. Strike to Ears with Both Fists (Shuāngfēng Guàn'ěr, 双峰贯耳)
15. Turn Body and Left Heel Kick (Zhuǎnshēn Zuǒ Dēngjiǎo, 转身左蹬脚)
16. Lower Body and Stand on One Leg, Left (Zuǒ Xiàshì Dúlì, 左下势独立)
  1. Snake Creeps Down (Shéshēn Xíngxià Shì, 蛇身行下势)
  2. Golden Rooster Stands on One Leg (Jīnjī Dúlì, 金鸡独立)
17. Lower Body and Stand on One Leg, Right (Yòu Xiàshì Dúlì, 右下势独立)
  1. Snake Creeps Down (Shéshēn Xíngxià Shì, 蛇身行下势)
  2. Golden Rooster Stands on One Leg (Jīnjī Dúlì, 金鸡独立)
18. Shuttle Back and Forth, Right and Left (Zuǒyòu Yùnǚ Chuānsuō, 右左玉女穿梭)
19. Needle at Sea Bottom (Hǎidǐ Zhēn, 海底针)
20. Fan Through Back (Shān Tōng Bèi, 扇通背)
21. Turn Body, Deflect, Parry, and Punch (Zhuǎnshēn Bānlánchuí, 转身搬拦捶)
22. Apparent Close Up (Rúfēng Sìbì, 如封似闭)
23. Cross Hands (Shízìshǒu, 十字手)
24. Closing (Shōushì, 收势)

== See also ==
- Tai chi
- Wushu (sport)
- 42-form tai chi
- 103-form Yang family tai chi
