= Zhaobao tai chi =

- 趙堡太極拳
- Hardness: Internal (neijia)
- Country of origin: China
- Date of formation: late 16th century
- Creator: Zhang Sanfeng (张三丰)
- Famous practitioners: Wang Zongyue(王宗岳); Jiang Fa (蒋法); Xing Xihuai (邢喜怀); Zhang Chuchen; Chen Jingbo (陈敬伯); Zhang Zongyu (张宗禹); Zhang Yan; Chen Qingping; He Zhaoyuan; Song Yunhua; Peng Wen
- Descendant arts: Wu (Hao)-style tai chi
- Related arts: Tai chi
- Olympic sport: No

Zhaobao tai chi (Chinese: 趙堡太極拳; pinyin: Zhàobǎo tàijíquán) is a style of tai chi that is often considered to be a modern style transmitted from Chen Qingping, but actually has a strong documented lineage that confirms its authenticity as an ancient style of tai chi and as a true transmission from Wang Zongyue.

== Form and Characteristics ==
The main set of Zhaobao tai chi, or Zhaobao Jia, consists of 108 movements in the big frame and 75 refined movements in the small frame progressing in difficulty. Great emphasis is placed on Yi (mind/intent) in Zhaobao training. Like many other styles, Zhaobao Jia can be practiced at three heights, each providing a different degree of complexity. Generally students begin with the Middle Frame (Renpan Jia), progress to the Low Frame (Pangong Jia) and end with the High Frame (Daili Jia).

Zhaobao tai chi's practical applications rely heavily on spiral uprooting techniques controlled through the use of Qinna, often followed with the use of sweeps or trips to bring the opponent to the ground. Flowing and coordinated techniques conform successfully to the basic tenets of the tai chi classics.

Zhaobao tai chi also has its own Neigong system based on traditional Daoist practice that enables the practitioner to develop the required physical and mental skills needed for successful mastery of the art.

== History and Lineage ==
The Zhaobao tai chi style shares many similarities with Chen-style tai chi and has an overlapping lineage - the 4th generation inheritor Chen Jingbo and the 7th generation inheritor Chen Qingping were both members of the famed Chen family.

Zhaobao tai chi is not a family style (although there exists the He Family offshoot named after the 8th generation inheritor He Zhaoyuan) and has traditionally been passed down from master to a chosen disciple. The Zhaobao name is given to the style as a way of honouring the village in which the art was kept for many centuries; Zhaobao Village in Wenxian County, Henan Province, China.

According to the style's tradition, Chen Qingping was the 7th generation master from the time that the grand master Jiang Fa brought the style taught to him by Wang Zongyue to the local area in Wenxian County.

Zhaobao tai chi's lineage down to Chen Qingping and He Zhaoyuan is as below:

Zhang Sanfeng (Chinese: 张三丰, Founder)

Various Daoists

Wang Zongyue (Chinese: 王宗岳, The Tai Chi Theorist)

Jiang Fa (Chinese: 蒋法, 1st generation)

Xing Xihuai (Chinese: 邢喜怀, 2nd generation)

Zhang Chuchen (Chinese: 张楚臣, 3rd generation)

Chen Jingbo (Chinese: 陈敬伯, 4th generation)

Zhang Zongyu (Chinese: 张宗禹, 5th generation)

Zhang Yan (Chinese: 张彦, 6th generation)

Chen Qingping (Chinese: 陳清苹, 7th generation)

He Zhaoyuan (Chinese: 和兆元, 8th generation)

=== Tai chi lineage tree with Zhaobao focus ===
Note:

- This lineage tree is not comprehensive, but depicts those considered the 'gate-keepers' & most recognised individuals in each generation of Zhaobao.
- Although many styles were passed down to respective descendants of the same family, the lineage focused on is that of Zhaobao & not necessarily that of a family.
- Names denoted by an asterisk are legendary or semi-legendary figures in the lineage; while their involvement in the lineage is accepted by most of the major schools, it is not independently verifiable from known historical records.

Key:	NEIJIA
Solid lines	Direct teacher-student.
Dot lines	Partial influence /taught informally /limited time.	Wang Zongyue*; TAI CHI
Dash lines	Individual(s) omitted.
Dash cross	Branch continues.
CHEN-STYLE	(蒋法); Jiang Fa; Zhaobao-style
(邢喜怀); Xing Xihuai; 2nd gen. Zhaobao
(陈正如); Chen Zhengru; 3rd gen. Chen	(张楚臣); Zhang Chuchen; 3rd gen. Zhaobao
(陈敬伯); Chen Jingbo; 4th gen. Chen; 4th gen. Zhaobao
Zhang Zongyu; 5th gen. Zhaobao
Chen Youben c. 19th century 6th gen. Chen; Chen Small Frame	(张彦); Zhang Yan; 6th gen. Zhaobao
YANG-STYLE	(陈清萍); Chen Qingping; 1795–1868; 7th gen. Chen; 7th gen. Zhaobao
Wu Yuxiang; 1812–1880; WU (HAO)-STYLE	(他招远); He Zhaoyuan; 1810–1890; 8th gen. Zhaobao; Zhaobao He-style
Li-style	(和庆喜); He Qingxi; 1857–1936; 9th gen. Zhaobao
WU-STYLE	SUN-STYLE
(宋蕴华); Song Yunhua; 1949–2006; 11th gen. Zhaobao
Wudang-style
CHEN-STYLE	YANG-STYLE	WU-STYLE	SUN-STYLE	WU (HAO)-STYLE

== Notes ==
=== Bibliography ===
- Peng, Wen. Zhao Bao Tai Chi Kung Fu, USA Tai Chi Culture Association. ISBN 978-0615255668
- Zheng, Wuqing. Wudang Zhaobao Taijiquan Small Frame, Da Zhan Publishing Company, Taiwan. ISBN 957-468-163-7 (only available in Chinese)
