= Chen Wangting =

Chinese military officer and tai chi founder

Chen Wangting 陳王廷
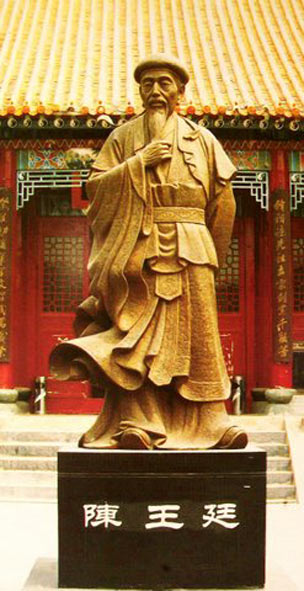
- Statue of Chen Wangting
- Born: 1580; Chen Village, Henan, China
- Died: 1660 (aged 79–80)
- Other names: Chen Zouting
- Nationality: Chinese
- Style: Chen-style tai chi (founder of Chen-style)

Other information
- Notable students: Chen Suole (陳所樂); Chen Ruxin (陳汝信)

Chen Wangting
- Chinese: 陳王庭
Transcriptions
Standard Mandarin
- Hanyu Pinyin: Chén Wángtíng

Chen Zouting
- Chinese: 陳奏庭
Transcriptions
Standard Mandarin
- Hanyu Pinyin: Chén Zòutíng

Chen Wangting (1580–1660), courtesy name Chen Zouting, was a Ming dynasty military officer who may have founded Chen-style tai chi, one of the five major styles of the popular Chinese martial art. He reputedly devised his style of tai chi after his retirement following the fall of the Ming dynasty.

== Military career ==
During the Ming dynasty, Chen served as Commander of the Wen County garrison, and was distinguished for his protection of merchant caravans in Henan and Shandong. After the Ming dynasty ended and the reign of the Qing dynasty began, Chen's military career was effectively over, and he retired to the family settlement.

== Influence on tai chi ==
Two widely documented theories of Chen's martial arts work exist: the first is that he learnt his arts from Wang Zongyue, Jiang Fa, and the Wudang tradition developed by Zhang Sanfeng. The second theory — the one accepted by the Chen family — is that he combined his previous military experience and the theories of meridians and Daoyin with the popular teachings of Qi Jiguang. His complete work contained five smaller sets of forms, a 108-move Long Fist (Note: "Long" as in "Continuous"; not to be confused with the external martial art also known as Long Fist or Changquan.) routine, and a Cannon Fist routine. Chen is also credited with the invention of the first push hands exercises. Chen also practiced a few Shaolin forms, and some historians postulate that Shaolin arts also had a significant influence on his tai chi, though none of the Taoist influences on Chen family tai chi exist in the Shaolin tradition.

Chen Wangting's next well-known successors were the 14th generation Chen Youben, who taught Chen Qingping who passed down Zhaobao Tai Chi, and Chen Changxing (1771–1853), who passed down Chen style large frame and was the direct teacher of the founder of Yang-style tai chi: Yang Luchan.
