= Scott M. Rodell =

Scott M. Rodell is a martial artist, author, and teacher of Yang-style taijiquan. He is the founding director of Great River Taoist Center, a non-profit organization based in Washington, D.C.

== Training & Lineage ==
Rodell began studying martial arts at the age of nine. He practiced karate, judo, tournament and instinct archery, wrestling, Olympic fencing, and marksmanship before devoting his training exclusively to Yang-style taijiquan in 1981.

Rodell studied taijiquan with two senior students of Cheng Man-ch'ing, William C.C. Chen and T.T. Liang, before finding his principal teacher, Wang Yen-nien. From Wang, Rodell learned the entire Yangjia Michuan Taijiquan (“Yang Family Hidden Teaching”) system. Wang Yen-nien is a disciple student of Zhang Qinlin, who in turn studied with Yang Chengfu and later Yang Jianhou.

Teacher	Material
Wang Yen-nien	Yangjia Michuan Taijiquan form, applications, tuishou, fan, spear, jian
William C.C. Chen	Tuishou, sanshou
T.T. Liang	Yangshi ("Yang style") taijijian, tuishou

In addition to his martial studies, Rodell was one of the first ten Americans to enter the door of the Jin Shan Pai, a traditional school of Taoist neigong. Rodell, initiated into the Jin Shan Pai by Wang Yen-nien, is a sixth generation teacher in this tradition.

== Teaching career ==
In 1984, Rodell founded and became director of Great River Taoist Center, a non-profit organization whose mission is to preserve and transmit the Yang family arts.

In 1991, Rodell began teaching in the Soviet Union at the request of the Soviet Wushu Federation. In 1992, the Great River officially opened a Moscow branch. Since then, Rodell's seminars and training camps have expanded Great River Taoist Center to include many branch groups and affiliates located throughout the continental United States, Northern Europe, and Australia. Northern European locations include the Estonian cities of Tallinn, Tartu, and Narva; Amsterdam, Netherlands; Angers, France; and Malmö, Sweden.

== Tournament Record ==
USAWKF Northeast Regional Competition, June 24 & 25, 1995, NYC

- Men’s Advanced Light Weight Restricted Step Push Hands Champion
- Men’s Middle Weight Moving Step Push Hands, Third Place

International Taiji Quan Championship, 1990, Republic of China

- Men’s featherweight Push Hands, Second Place
