= Yang Zhenduo =

Chinese martial artist (1926–2020)

Yang Zhenduo 杨振铎
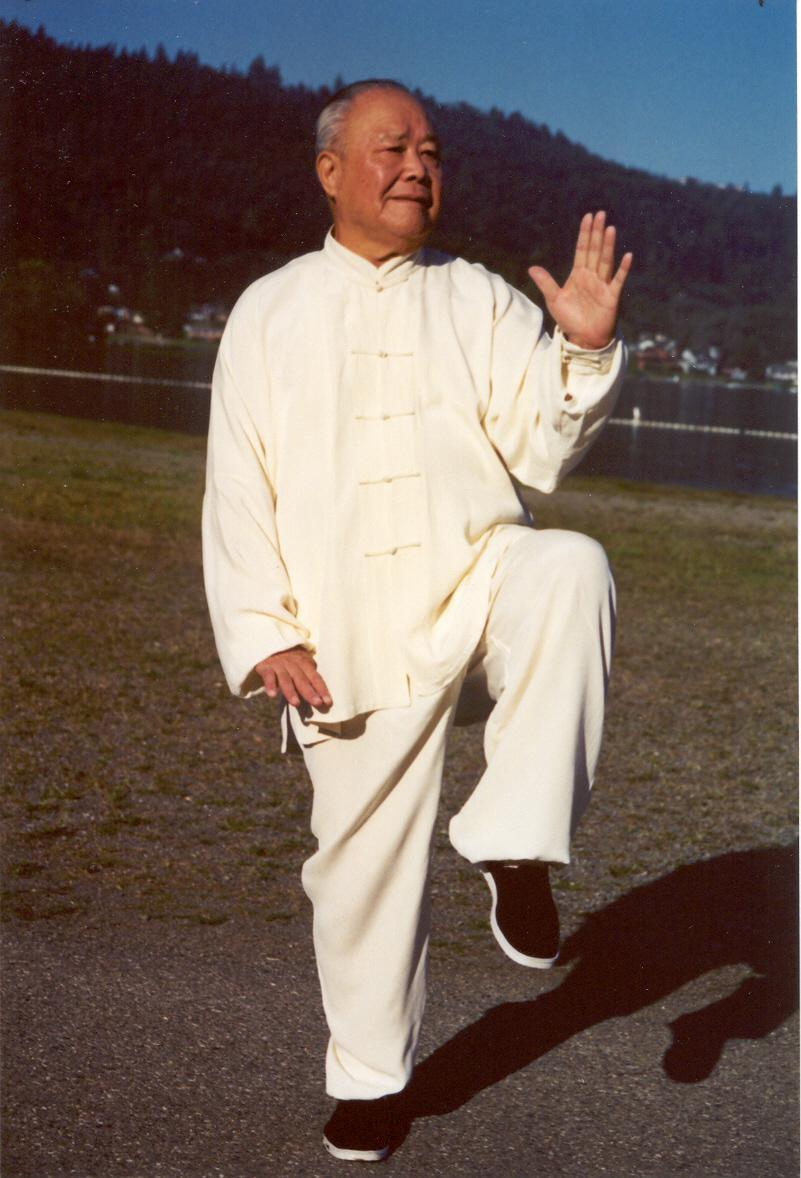
- Yang Zhenduo performing Golden Rooster Stands On One Leg (右金鸡独立)
- Born: 1926; Beijing, China
- Died: 7 November 2020 (aged 94)
- Style: Yang-style tai chi

Other information
- Notable students: Yang Jun
- Website: International Yang Family Tai Chi Chuan Association

Yang Zhenduo
- Traditional Chinese: 楊振鐸
- Simplified Chinese: 杨振铎
Transcriptions
Standard Mandarin
- Hanyu Pinyin: Yáng Zhènduó

Yang Zhenduo (1926 – 7 November 2020), a native of Yongnian, Hebei, was born in Beijing, China, into the famous Yang family of martial artists. A son of Yang Chengfu and a great-grandson of Yang Luchan (the creator of the Yang style of tai chi), Yang Zhenduo was a fourth-generation descendant of the Yang Family of tai chi, and the fourth lineage-holder of the style.

== Biography ==
Yang Zhenduo began studying the soft style martial art of tai chi at age 6 with his father, and continued studying with his elder brothers Yang Shouzhong, Yang Zhenji, and his younger brother Yang Zhenguo after his father died.

He lived in Taiyuan, Shanxi Province, China, since 1960, teaching the large frame of the Yang-style tai chi, and was invited many times to teach and hold seminars in many countries around the world.

He served as vice-president of the Shanxi Wushu Association since 1980. In 1982 he founded and served as president of the Shanxi Yang Style Tai Chi Chuan Association, and was its honorary lifetime president. This association has now grown to over 30,000 members throughout the Province and is the largest martial arts organization of its kind in China. In October 1998 Yang Zhenduo founded the International Yang Style Tai Chi Chuan Association, serving as its chairman of the board. Under his leadership, the association has now grown to 28 centers in 12 countries with more than 2000 members worldwide.

In 1996 the Chinese Wushu Academy recognized Yang Zhenduo as one of the Top 100 Wushu Masters in China. That same year he received the honor of being proclaimed Honorary Resident by the mayor of San Antonio, Texas, and in 1997 he received the Golden Key to the City of Troy, Michigan from its mayor.

Yang Zhenduo appeared several times on the covers of T'ai Chi Magazine and other martial arts publications. He has authored many articles and written books on the study of tai chi, as well as produced 3 complete sets of teaching videos of the art.

While retaining his position as chairman of the International Yang Style Tai Chi Chuan Association until his death, Yang Zhenduo retired from his regular teaching activities, his position as president of the association, and appointed his student Yang Jun, his grandson, as its new president to continue his work.

In July 2009, at the First International Tai Chi Chuan Symposium, Grandmaster Yang Zhenduo announced that Master Yang Jun is the fifth lineage-holder of the Traditional Yang-style tai chi.

== Disciples ==
Grandmaster Yang Zhenduo acknowledged the following people as his Disciples. These individuals have studied and promoted the Yang-style tai chi for many years.

- Hu Buyun, 胡步云
- Yang Yongfen, 杨永芬
- Guo Jiansheng, 郭建生
- Ge Jingang, 戈金刚
- Xie Wende, 谢文德
- Wang Dexing, 王德星
- Gao Junsheng, 高俊生
- Zhang Suzhen, 张素珍
- Yang Liru, 杨礼儒
- Miao Guangzhao, 苗光照
- Li Chunhou, 李存厚
- Sun Gangchen, 孙刚臣
- Cheng Xiangyun, 程相云
- Yang Chunru, 杨春如
- Zhou Yazhen, 周亚珍
- Lin Qiuya (Malaysia), 林秋雅（马来西亚）
- Wang Wen, 王 文
- Zhang Guiying, 张桂英
- Hua Xiaolong, 滑小龙
- Mei Mei Teo (Sweden), 张美美（瑞典）
- Duan Yinglian, 段英莲
- Li Shoutang, 李寿堂
- Li Xiuying, 李秀英
- Han Hoong Wang (USA), 王涵蓉（美国）
- Yan Fengxiang, 阎凤祥
- Jia Chengping, 贾承平
- Li Qimei, 李七梅
- Qiao Rongjian, 乔荣建
- Tian Xianwen, 田宪文
- Song Bin, 宋 斌
- Geng Ying, 耿 英
- Yang Wenshen, 杨文升
- Luo Haiping, 罗海平
- Yao Junfang, 药俊芳
- Wang Baixuan, 王白玄
- Jian Guiyan, 简桂妍
- Liang Xiufang, 梁秀芳
- Niu Xinzhong, 牛新中
- Li Tiancai, 李天才
- Andy Lee
- Bill Walsh
- Dave Barrett
- Frank Grothstueck
- Jean-Marc Geering
- Andre Leray

== See also ==
- 103-form Yang family tai chi (Long Form)
- Two-person Pushing Hands
