= Xie Bingcan =

Notable expert and teacher of Qigong, Tuina, and Taijiquan (1934–2020)

- Traditional Chinese: 謝炳燦
- Simplified Chinese: 谢炳灿
Transcriptions
Standard Mandarin
- Hanyu Pinyin: Xiè Bǐngcàn

Xie Bingcan 謝炳燦
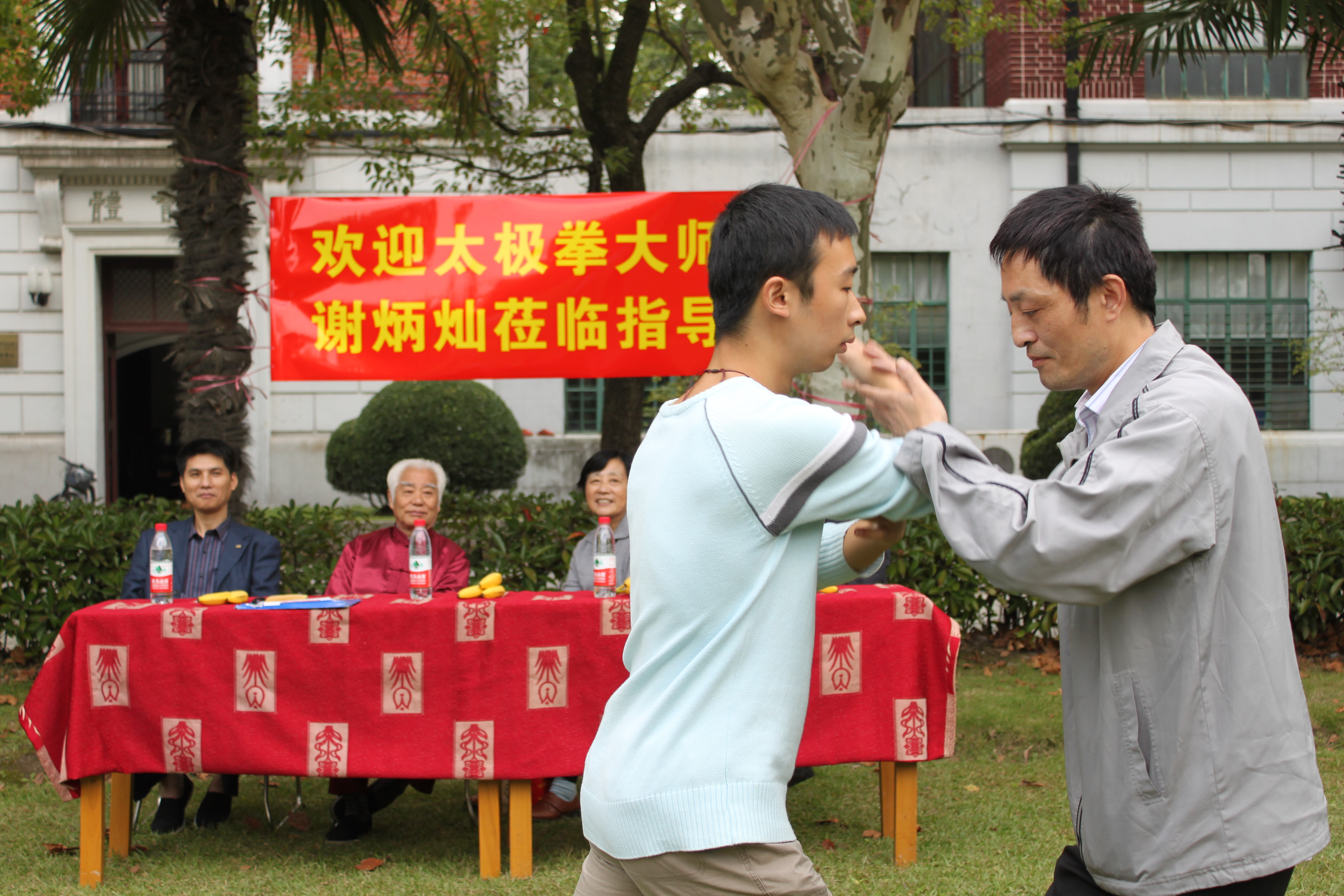
- Born: 9 September 1934; Yuyao, China
- Died: 29 April 2020 (aged 85)
- Style: Yang-style tai chi Wu-style tai chi

Xie Bingcan or Xie Bingshan (1934 - 2020) was a notable expert and teacher of qigong, Tuina, and tai chi.

== Biography ==
Xie Bingcan was born in Yuyao, China. At twenty years old, he traveled on foot from Yuyao to Shanghai, to find work at the Shanghai Mechanized Construction Group. While supporting himself there as a mechanic, Xie devoted his spare hours to the study of Daoist qigong and martial arts. His workmates were so impressed by his dedication, they assigned him the nickname "Maoshan Dao Shr."

In 1958, Xie joined the Yongnian Taijiquan Association, led by the tai chi master Fu Zhongwen. Xie focused all his efforts on this martial art. Following the instructions of his teacher, Xie repeated the traditional Yang style form ten times in a row without rest. He performed this feat daily for many years. During this period, Xie often slept only three to four hours a night.

With the support of Fu Zhongwen, Xie started to assist in teaching push hands at the Yongnian Association. Xie made a point to spend one or two minutes with each student, and to give feedback on their performance. During a typical class, he would tutor sixty to eighty pupils. Xie also traveled with Fu inside China, and as his senior student, occasionally answered challenges on his behalf.

Gradually, Xie's reputation grew, and in 1980 he was invited to join the faculty at East China Normal University. He offered teaching in Yang-style tai chi sword and saber, as well as the hand form and push hands. Xie also served as a competition judge for the Shanghai Wushu Association, and as a contributing member of the International Qigong Research Association, among other posts and honors.

Despite having built a reputation as an expert himself, Xie continued to seek new insights and perspectives. Starting in 1987, Xie advanced his long-established study of Wu-style tai chi under the personal instruction of Ma Yueliang and Wu Yinghua.

After a favorable mention by Zhang Luping in the April 1990 issue of T'ai Chi Magazine, Xie was recognized in the English-speaking tai chi community. Students began traveling from the United States and elsewhere to seek his instruction. Four years later, he moved to Bothell, Washington, joining an active Chinese martial arts community in the greater Seattle area.

Xie Bingcan continued teaching his beloved art, and preparing the next generation of tai chi masters, until his death at age 85, in April 2020.

== Publications ==
Xie, Bingcan (December 1995). "The Eight Power Strokes and Five Steps of Tai Chi Chuan". T'ai Chi Magazine. Wayfarer Publications. ISSN 0730-1049.

Xie, Bingcan (December 1996). "Mental Discipline in T'ai Chi Practice". T'ai Chi Magazine. Wayfarer Publications. ISSN 0730-1049.

Xie, Bingcan (December 2003). "How to Improve T'ai Chi Form Practice". T'ai Chi Magazine. Wayfarer Publications. ISSN 0730-1049.
