= 42-form tai chi =

Wushu competition movement sequence

The 42-posture tai chi form, also called the Taijiquan Competition Form is a series of movements standardized in 1989 for international wushu competition. It combines movements drawn from the Chen, Yang, Wu, and Sun styles of traditional tai chi, and has also become a popular exercise for the general public.

In 1976, Men Huifeng of Beijing Sport University and Li Deyin of People's University created a form combining postures from those four major styles for the official Chinese Sports Committee of China, as part of a post-Cultural Revolution initiative to rehabilitate martial arts as a modern sport. This resulted in the standardized 48-posture tai chi form.

In 1989, Men and Li shortened the combined form for the purposes of competition timing and scoring, resulting in the final 42-posture sequence. Today this is the international wushu standard tai chi competition form, and it has also become popular as an exercise to improve and maintain health.

In 1990, the 42-posture form made its debut on the world stage, when wushu was for the first time included in the 11th Asian Games.

The postures are as follows:

42-posture tai chi (42式太极拳)

1. Commencing form (起势)
2. Grasp the peacock's tail (right) (右揽雀尾)
3. Single whip (left) (左单鞭)
4. Raise hands (提手)
5. White crane spreads its wings (白鹤亮翅)
6. Brush knee and twist step on both sides (搂膝拗步)
7. Parry and punch (撇身捶)
8. Deflect and press on both sides (捋挤势)
9. Parry and push (进步搬拦捶)
10. Apparent close (如封似闭)
11. Open and close hands (开合手)
12. Single whip (right) (右单鞭)
13. Punch under elbow (肘底捶)
14. Turn body and push palm on both sides (转身推掌)
15. Fair lady works the shuttles on both sides (玉女穿梭)
16. Kick with heel on both sides (右左蹬脚)
17. Cover hands and punch (掩手肱捶)
18. Part the wild horse's mane on both sides (野马分鬃)
19. Wave hands like clouds (云手)
20. Step back and beat the tiger (獨立打虎)
21. Separate legs (right) (右分脚)
22. Strike opponent's ears with both fists (雙峰贯耳)
23. Separate legs (left) (左分脚)
24. Turn body and slap foot (转身拍脚)
25. Step forward and punch downward (进步栽捶)
26. Oblique flying (斜飛势)
27. Snake creeps to the right (单鞭下势)
28. Golden rooster stands on one leg (right and left) (金鸡獨立)
29. Step back and thrust palm (退步穿掌)
30. Press palm in empty stance (退步压掌)
31. Hold palm up and stand on one leg (獨立托掌)
32. Lean with body in horse stance (马步靠)
33. Turn body for large roll back (转身大捋)
34. Grab and punch in resting step (歇步擒打)
35. Thread palm and push down (穿掌下势)
36. Step forward to seven-star posture (上步七星)
37. Mount the tiger and stand on one leg (腿步跨虎)
38. Turn body with lotus kick (转身摆莲)
39. Bend the bow to shoot the tiger (彎弓射弧)
40. Grasp the peacock's tail (left) (左揽雀尾)
41. Cross hands (十字手)
42. Closing form (收势)

== See also ==
- 24-form tai chi
- tai chi
