= International Yang Style Tai Chi Chuan Association =

The International Yang Style Tai Chi Chuan Association is a non-profit organization dedicated to the teaching, promotion and propagation of the Traditional Yang-style tai chi. It was founded on October 29, 1998 by Grandmaster Yang Zhenduo and his grandson Master Yang Jun. The association is headquartered in Seattle, Washington, United States.

== History ==
In 1995, during an exhibition of Yang-style tai chi promoted by the Shanxi Tai Chi Chuan Association in Taiyuan, China, a meeting was held with the participation of Masters Yang Zhenduo and Yang Jun and many other instructors of tai chi from all over the world, whom they had met during their many travels. During the meeting it was decided to create the Yang Chengfu Tai Chi Chuan Centers and subsequently, three offices were opened in the United States in Texas, Michigan and New York, with directors Horacio Lopez, Han Hoong Wang and Bill Walsh, respectively. Yang Zhenduo opened these centers in honor of his father, Yang Chengfu, who was responsible for the widespread popularity of Yang-style tai chi. In 1996 fourth center was added in New Jersey, United States, with director Andy Lee.

For years the Masters Yang Zhenduo and Yang Jun had visited the Yang Chengfu Tai Chi Chuan Centers, so the time was ripe for the creation of an International Organization which combined the centers and schools in each country into a cohesive structure. To attract more students, however, it was decided that an Association provided the best structure. So, on October 29, 1998 the International Yang Style Tai Chi Chuan Association was founded in Seattle, Washington, United States. Then in August of the following year, Yang Jun, moved to Seattle with his wife Fang Hong and in September opened the Seattle center. Its website first opened on April 24, 1999.

Currently, the association has 28 centers in 12 countries with more than 2000 members worldwide.

Several martial arts magazines have published articles on the International Yang Style Tai Chi Chuan Association.

== Purpose ==
The purpose of the association is the promotion of Yang-style tai chi throughout the world. The following are the charters of the association:

- to develop new Yang Chengfu Tai Chi Chuan Centers;
- to promote interaction with other associations of martial arts;
- to accept individual members;
- to hold seminars and competitions;
- to assess the levels of skills of Yang-style tai chi practitioners;
- to organize teams of judges in traditional Yang-style tai chi;
- to provide products of the Yang Style Tai Chi Chuan Association.
