= Yang Jun (martial artist) =

Chinese martial artist

Yang Jun 杨军
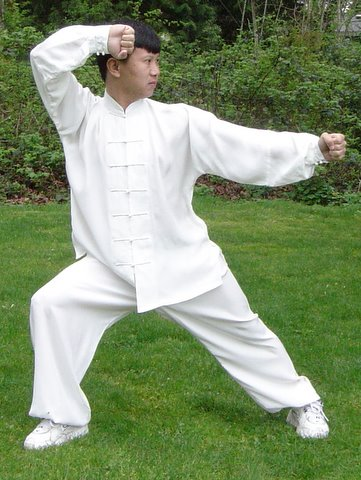
- Master Yang Jun performing Bend the Bow and Shoot the Tiger (弯弓射虎).
- Born: 1968 (age 57–58); Taiyuan, Shanxi, China
- Style: Yang-style taijiquan

Other information
- Website: International Yang Family Tai Chi Chuan Association

Yang Jun
- Traditional Chinese: 楊軍
- Simplified Chinese: 杨军
Transcriptions
Standard Mandarin
- Hanyu Pinyin: Yáng Jūn

Yang Jun is a Wushu master who was born in Taiyuan, Shanxi, China in 1968 into the famous Yang family of martial artists. A son of Yang Daofang (adopted by Yang Zhenduo) and a grandson of Yang Zhenduo, he is a direct descendant of Yang Chengfu and of Yang Luchan, the creator of Yang-style tai chi. Yang Jun is a sixth-generation descendant of the Yang family of tai chi, and is the fifth lineage-holder of the style.

== Biography ==
Master Yang Jun spent his childhood and formative years living with his grandparents. Growing up in a martial arts family, he saw and heard his grandfather training his students. It was in this nurturing environment that he became deeply immersed in his family’s tai chi heritage. Yang Jun began studying and training in the soft style martial art of tai chi at age 5 with his grandfather Yang Zhenduo, who raised him.

Proficient in Hand Form, Sword, Saber, Push Hands, and other forms of the art of the Yang-style of tai chi, Grandmaster Yang Zhenduo prepared him to continue and advance the martial arts tradition of the Yang family.

Since 1986 he has travelled with his grandfather to teach, initially inside of China and then internationally to the United States in 1990. After many years and seminars around the world, Yang Jun became an accomplished martial artist and teacher. His forms involve the combination of softness with hardness, finesse and spirit, and restraint with expression.

In 1989 he graduated with a degree in physical education from Shanxi University, China.

Between 1995 and 1997, Yang Jun served as the Vice President of Operations, Techniques and Training, and since 1997, as First President of the Shanxi Province Yang Style Tai Chi Chuan Association, which now has over 30,000 members in the province of Shanxi alone. In October 1998 Yang Jun and his grandfather Yang Zhenduo founded the International Yang Style Tai Chi Chuan Association in Seattle, Washington, United States, and has served as its President since. In August 1999 he moved to Seattle with his wife Fang Hong (Chinese: 方虹) to establish the International Association there, and in September 1999, he started the Yang Cheng Fu Tai Chi Chuan Center in Seattle's International District (Chinatown).

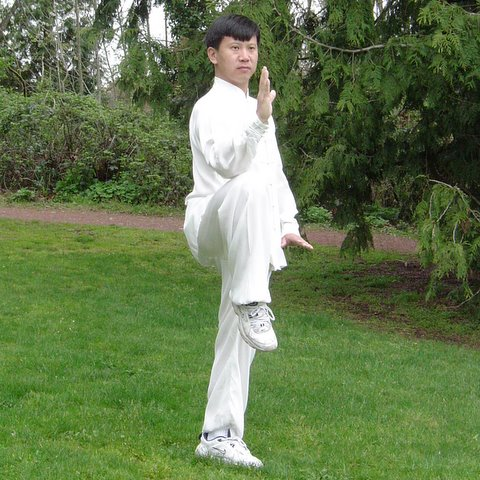
Master Yang Jun performing Golden Rooster Stands on One Leg, Left (左金鸡独立).

In 1995 the Chinese Wushu Academy recognized Yang Jun as a famous Wushu master in Shanxi Province. In 1996 he was certified as the highest level national judge and served as the head judge at the 1998 National Tai Chi Competition in China.

Master Yang Jun has been interviewed by several martial arts magazines due to his lifetime expertise in tai chi. As the assistant to his grandfather, he has also appeared in several educational videos, such as Yang Style Taijiquan by Yang Zhenduo and Taijiquan, Sword and Saber (1996), produced by China Sports Publishers. Master Yang Jun has published several educational videos of his own, including Yang Style Taijiquan Form 49 (2001) and Yang Family Tai Chi Chuan Traditional Form (2005).

Yang Jun has a daughter, Yang Yaning (Chinese: 杨雅宁), born in 1992, and a son, Yang (Jason) Yajie (Chinese: 杨雅杰), born in 2002.

== Lineage holder ==
In July 2009, at the First International Tai Chi Symposium, current lineage holder, Grandmaster Yang Zhenduo, announced that Yang Jun is the fifth lineage-holder of the Traditional Yang-style tai chi.

== See also ==
- 103-form Yang family tai chi (Long Form)
- Two-person Pushing Hands
