= Rozell =

Rozell is a surname. Notable people with the surname include:

- Herb Rozell (born 1931), American politician
- Mark J. Rozell, American academic administrator

== See also ==
- Rodell (surname)
