= Rodell =

Rodell may refer to:

- Rodell, Wisconsin
- Rodell (surname)
