= Zhang Luping =

Chinese martial artist

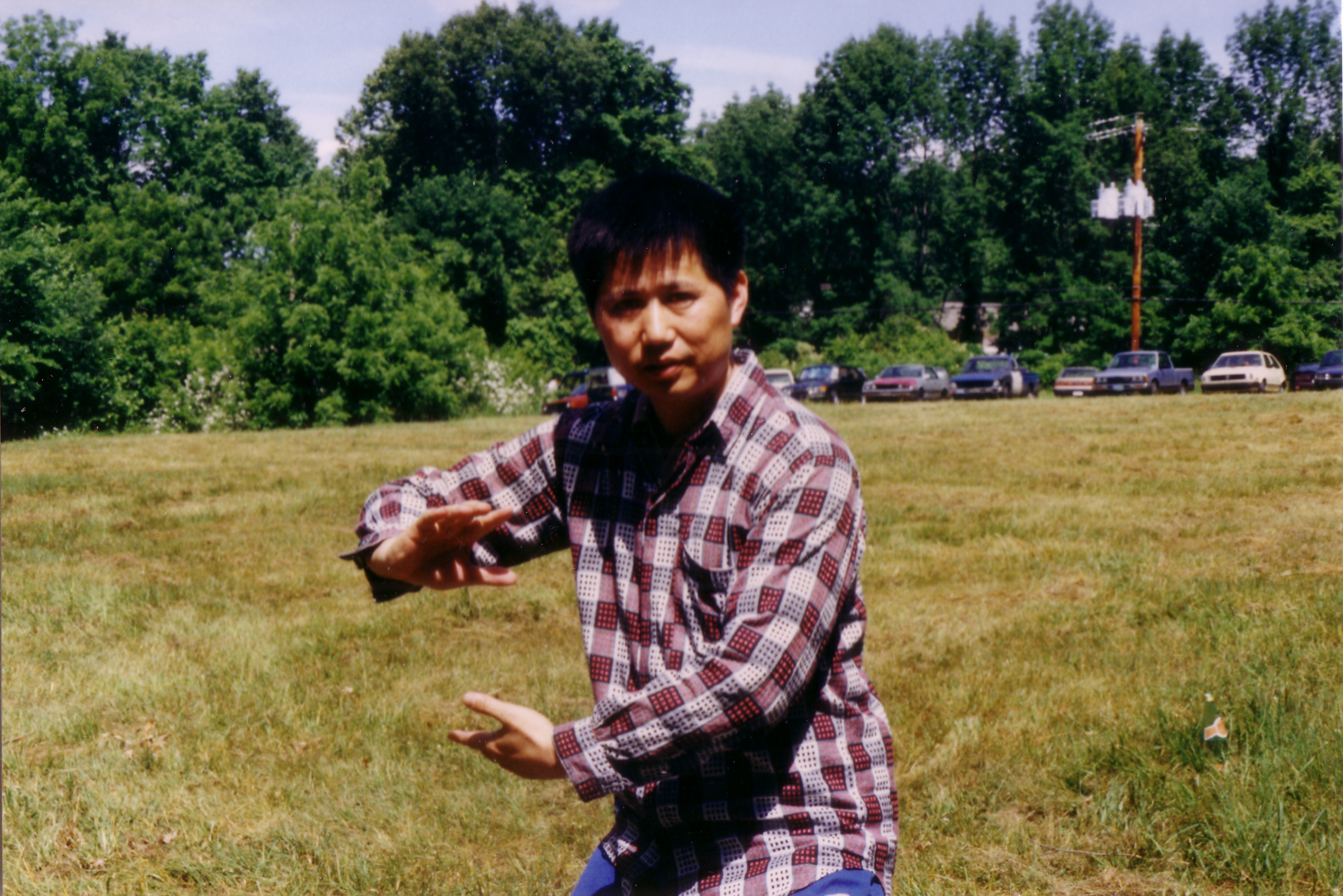
- Zhang Luping demonstrating tai chi at the Tai Chi Farm (Zhang Sanfeng Festival)

Zhang Luping (simplified Chinese: 张鹭平; traditional Chinese: 張鹭平; 1945-1998) was a Chinese martial artist and mathematician born in Jiaxing, Zhejiang province. He was best known in China for his exceptional skill at tai chi's push hands, and for an incident in his hometown in which he accidentally broke a weightlifting champion’s forearm during an arm wrestling match. He was a student of Cai Hongxiang (蔡鸿祥), Wang Ziping, and Xie Bingcan. He was also a descendant of Zhang Jun and of Zhang Jiugao (張九皋), who was the brother of Zhang Jiuling. He was noted for his deep knowledge of the five styles of tai chi, his superb application of the principles, and his highly developed internal power. In an age when many great martial arts teachers remained reluctant to share their highest insights and techniques, Zhang championed in his teaching an attitude of openness and a strong desire to ensure the continuation of Chinese martial traditions.

== Martial arts career ==
Zhang started learning Shaolin kung fu when he was 13 years old from Shaolin and Jin Woo grandmaster Fang Nantang (方南堂). Zhang was captain of the Wushu team at East China Normal University in Shanghai, where he studied under three-time Chinese Wushu national champion (1953-1960) and five-time Chinese national martial arts competition gold medalist Cai Hong Xiang. Because of his excellent performance and dedication to learning the arts, Cai Hong Xiang arranged for Zhang to study under the famous grandmaster Wang Ziping. Zhang also had the privilege at that time of studying alongside The Magic Fist Dragon, Cai Long Yun.

Eventually, Zhang developed an interest in tai chi. He learned Chen-style tai chi from many Chen lineage holders, including Dong Xianggen (董祥根) and Du Wencai (都文才), who was the last student of Chen Zhaokui (陈照奎). His form was also corrected by grandmaster Gu Liuxin (顾留馨) (a former student of Chen Fake, Sun Lutang, and Chen Weiming, who corrected his style with a level of detail that would set him apart from other Chen style practitioners). Zhang also studied Wu-style tai chi with master Sun Renzhi (孙润志) and xinyi, another internal style similar to tai chi, with the well-known Shanghai-based master, "Little Tiger" Zhang Haisheng (小老虎章海深), who was highly respected for his skill in combat.

== Scholarship and emigration to the United States ==
Zhang earned his master's degree in mathematics at East Normal University in Shanghai under Cheng Changping (陈昌平教授), who had done extensive mathematics work with Wolf Von Wahl at the University of Bayreuth in West Germany. Zhang also studied under professor Wang Guangyin (王光寅) at the math research department of Chinese Academy of Sciences in Beijing. In 1983, Zhang published an article in The Mathematical Journal (数学学报) entitled “Hλ solutions of the 1st class of Fuchs type equations with operator coefficients” (一类具算子系数的Fuchs型方程的Hλ解) with his colleague Wang Juyan (王继延).

Zhang Luping was known in the academic community for his ground-breaking work in differential equations. He came to the United States in 1985 for a master's degree in mathematics at Carnegie-Mellon University in Pittsburgh, PA, following which he completed a doctorate degree and a post doctorate degree at the University of Massachusetts, Amherst under M. S. Berger. In November 1994, he co-authored with professor Berger a paper published by International Publications for the PanAmerican Mathematical Journal entitled “A New Method for Large Quasiperiodic Nonlinear Oscillations with Fixed Frequencies for the Non-dissipative Second Order Conservative System of the Second Type” about the communication of applied nonlinear analysis. After completing his post-doctorate work, he taught mathematics at the University of California, Irvine and the University of Massachusetts, Amherst.

== Legacy ==
In 1975, Zhang became the Zhejiang Province Chen-style tai chi champion. MA. In 1998, Zhang defeated several local martial artists in Pittsburgh, PA and was invited to teach seminars at the Zhang Sanfeng Festival at the Tai Chi Farm owned by late master Jou Tsung Hwa. He held seminars all across the U.S. and judged many U.S. competitions, including the Houston 1990 United States National Chinese Martial Arts Competition. He was a Special Master for Taste of China and many similar martial arts events. He was twice pictured on the cover of Tai Chi International Magazine, as well as Inside Kung Fu magazine and the Pa Kua Zhang Newsletter. The Australian magazine Tai Chi Combat and Health called Master Zhang the "Real Thing" In Tai Chi for Dummies, author Therese Ikoian wrote, "The late tai chi Master Zhang Lu Ping knew the spiraling technique well. Manny Fuentes had the 'privilege of being thrown around by him'. No matter how well Manny thought that he'd prepared a pending movement, he said that he was moved as easily as if he were a leaf, not a 175-pound man! By the time Zhang manifested the spiraling force up into his arms and hands, it contained an irresistible momentum."

Zhang died of stomach cancer on April 5, 1998 in Amherst, Massachusetts. He received treatment there and in California for his cancer, which he felt was caused by his poor diet — mostly potatoes — during the Cultural Revolution. His son Huan Zhang teaches tai chi and other martial arts in the Boston area, has published numerous articles in martial arts publications in the US and China as well as a book on tai chi in China, and in the US has collaborated on textbooks and research on tai chi and health. In 2018 Huan Zhang wrote a biographical article titled "In Memory of my Father, Zhang Luping" for China’s leading martial arts magazine, Martial Spirit (武魂).
