= Kuo Lien-ying =

Mongolian martial artist (1985–1984)

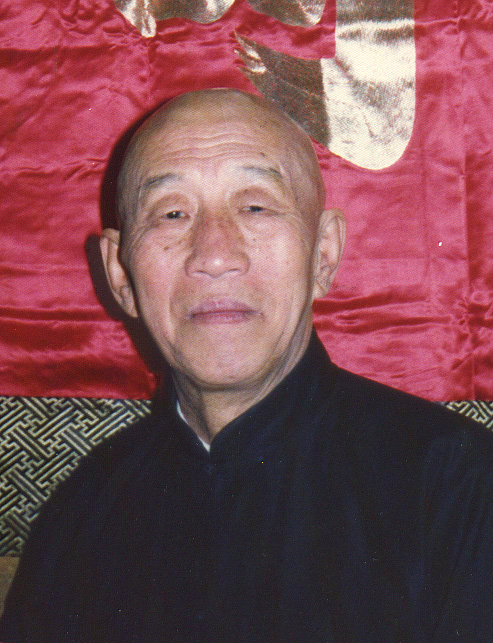
- Kuo in 1975
- Born: 1895; Inner Mongolia, China
- Died: 1984 (aged 88–89); Mongolia
- Style: Guang Ping Yang tai chi

Other information
- Notable students: Kwok Wo-ngai
- Website: Guang Ping Yang Association

Kuo Lien-ying (1895 in Inner Mongolia, China – 1984) was one of the most distinguished and revered martial artists of the twentieth century. He brought the Guang Ping Yang tai chi to the United States.

== History ==
Kuo Lien-ying's father was a silk merchant, and the family was independently wealthy. As a youngster, Kuo reportedly had no interest in an academic education, wanting only to learn the fighting arts.

In 1907, at the age of 12, Kuo started training in Northern Style Shaolin kung fu, studying for five years with Master Li Lin, who was especially skilled in changquan. Kuo became proficient at this martial arts system, which was originally developed by Buddhist monks in China. His pushing hands training partner in Taiwan was Tchoung Ta-tchen.

At 23, Kuo became one of only four inner-door disciples of Wang Jiao-yu, himself one of only two inner-door students of Yang Banhou. Yang Banhou was the son of the originator of what has become known as Guang Ping Yang tai chi: Yang Luchan (born Guangping) and known as the founder of Yang-style tai chi. After completing "Chin to Toe" in 100 days Kuo was taught the Guang Ping Yang tai chi by the 100-year-old master Wang Jiao-yu.

Kuo, at age 28, studied xingyiquan for two years with Master Huang Ginyin, a highly skilled student of Guo Yunshen, himself the teacher of Wang Xiangzhai, who was reputed to be the best xingyiquan fighter of his time.

Kuo also studied Baguazhang with Chang Hsin-zhai and Cheng Tinghua.

=== Early career ===
Kuo Lien-ying reportedly was a bodyguard for a while accompanying the gold caravans through China, protecting the caravans on horseback with his unrivaled rope-dart techniques.

He allegedly became the governor of a province in China, and later a general in the army of Chiang Kai-shek. In 1947, during the Chinese Communist Revolution, he fled to Taiwan, where he became a congressman and opened a martial arts school. Although he left his four wives and eight children in China, Kuo wooed and married the 21-year-old sister of one of his students, Ein Simmone Kuo.

Kuo was so confident of his fighting skills that in 1951 he issued a challenge to world boxing champion Joe Louis, to meet him for a fight. In 1972 Kuo claimed to the San Francisco Chronicle, "I could have thrown him."

=== Kuo Lien-ying in America ===
In 1965, he immigrated to the United States and settled in San Francisco's Chinatown, leaving his young wife behind in Taiwan. At the request of his first U.S. student, David Chin, Kuo began teaching a few students on the roof of a local hotel.

After less than a year, Kuo returned to Taiwan to bring Simmone Kuo to San Francisco. While he was in Taiwan, his students in San Francisco located an empty storefront at 11 Brenham Place, an alley which faced Portsmouth Square Park, which was unfortunately adjacent to a funeral parlor. The empty storefront was available due to the superstitions of the local residents who did not want to inhabit a place next to a mortuary. But according to one of his later students, Henry Look, Kuo often told him, "Don’t worry about dead people, worry about live ones." The students converted the storefront into a martial arts studio, with living quarters in the rear. Kuo named his new school, "Lien-Ying Tai-Chi Chuan Martial Arts Academy".

In 1967, Kuo and Simmone had a son, Kuo Chung-mei. Chung-mei was trained in the Shaolin kung fu and tai chi styles at an early age, achieving Chin-to-Toe at 18 months.

Kuo was one of the major theorists of the Chin school, which offers the closest blend of the hard and soft styles. Chin stylists claim there is a 50-50 blend of the two because while you are yielding, you are most conscious of unyielding and that is the only way you can take advantage of all things.

== Portsmouth Square, Chinatown ==
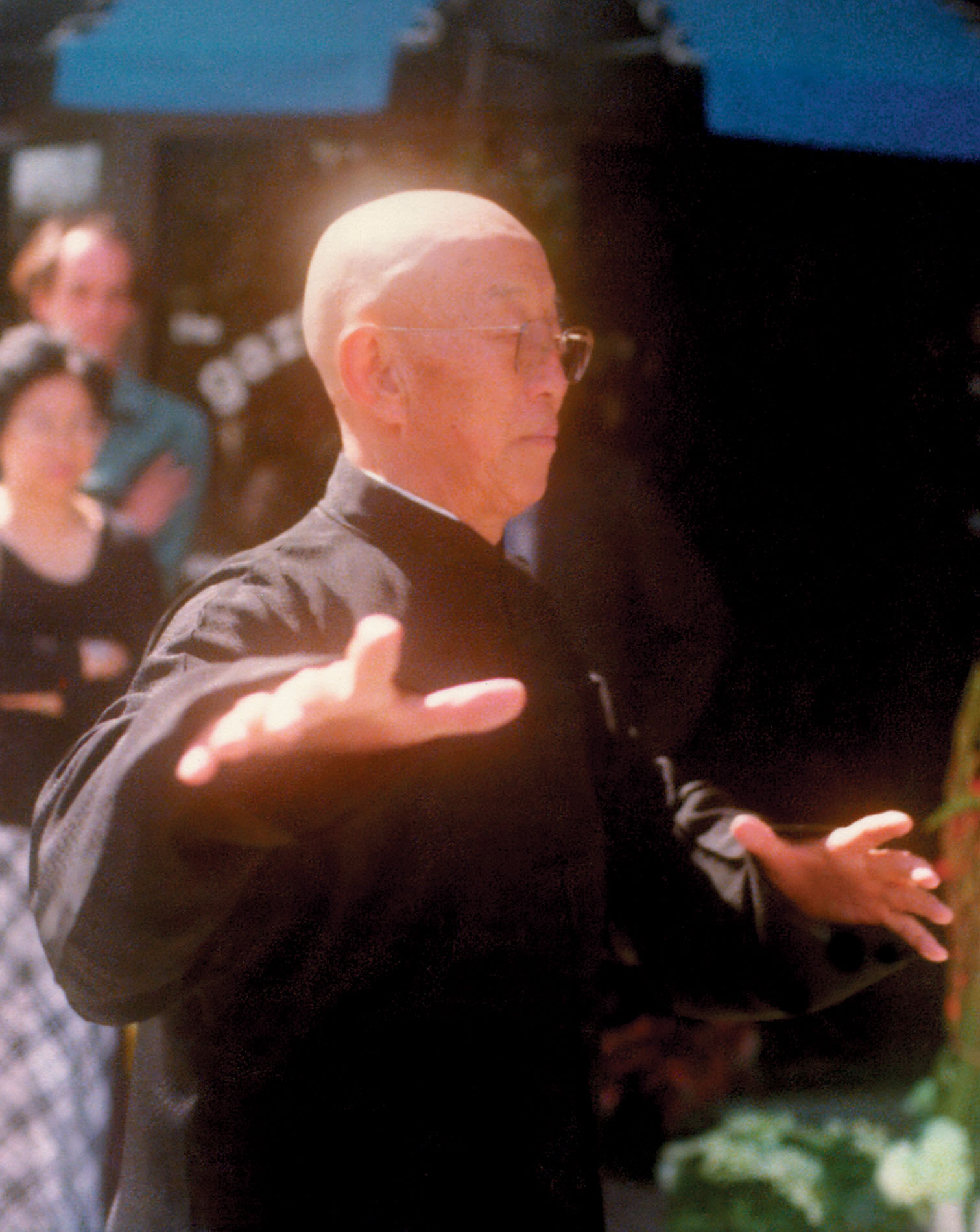
Grandmaster Kuo Lien-ying, photo by Rubbo

Reportedly, one of the stories that Kuo told his students was about the time he was walking in a Chinatown alley late one evening and was set upon by a group of robbers. Kuo reached down and picked up a piece of metal lying on the ground and with his bare hands pounded the spike into the brick wall of the nearest building, and then hung his jacket on the spike. The would-be robbers fled.

With an uncanny sixth sense, Kuo knew when his students would sleep in, missing the 5 a.m. practice session, and he would call them up, shouting in Chinese into the telephone, "Lela, lela, tai chi, tai chi!" ("Practice, practice, tai chi, tai chi!")

Kuo Lien-ying was among the first Chinese martial arts masters in America to teach Asian fighting arts to American students, and was often admonished by other Chinese teachers to not teach to Westerners.

In 1975 Sam Peckinpah filmed part of The Killer Elite in Portsmouth Square, and hired Kuo Lien-ying and many of his students for the scenes of a martial arts school in San Francisco.

Kuo and his students gave many demonstrations of tai chi and Shaolin kung fu at many locations, including schools and banks.

In 1983, Kuo returned to Mongolia, and died in 1984.

== Followers ==
Simmone Kuo, Kuo's widow and student, continues to teach privately at the Lien-Ying Tai-Chi Chuan Martial Arts Academy in San Francisco Chinatown (15A Walter U Lum Place, above the produce market) after retiring in 2016 from physical education teaching duties at San Francisco State University.

Notable students of Master Kuo that were largely responsible for the transmission of the art include Masters Peter Kwok, Henry Look, Y.C.Wong, and Y.C. Chiang.

The founder of World Tai Chi and Qigong Day, Bill Douglas, carries on the form under the name Guang Ping Yang tai chi, as passed down from Kuo Lien-ying to Gilles Messenger to Colin Berg, Anne Beier and Jennifer Booth, Bill's teacher.

== Guang Ping Yang Tai Chi Association ==
The Guang Ping Yang Tai Chi Association was formed in 1997 to honor the memory of Sifu Kuo Lien-ying and in commemoration of his unselfish sharing of his many skills. The mission of the Association is to promote, perpetuate, develop interest in, and preserve the quality of Guang Ping Yang tai chi throughout the world, and to provide support for research and education in Guang Ping Yang tai chi.

- Honorary Chairmen: Y.C. Chiang, Henry Look
- Past Presidents: Henry Look, Donald Rubbo, Nina Hopkins Sugawara, Nick D’Antoni, Dominick Ruggieri, Randy Elia, Lawrence Riddle, Lucy Bartimole, Grace Cheng, Valarie Prince Gabel
- Current President: David Chosid

== Books ==
- The T'ai Chi Boxing Chronicle, Compiled and explained by Kuo Lien-ying, translated into English by Gordon Guttman ISBN 1-55643-177-5
- Tai-Chi Chuan in Theory and Practice, ISBN 1-55643-298-4
