= Yang Shouzhong =

Chinese martial artist

Yang Shouzhong 杨守中
- Born: Yang Zhenming (杨振铭); 1910; China
- Died: 1985 (aged 74–75)
- Style: Yang-style taijiquan

Other information
- Notable students: Ip Tai Tak, Chu Gin Soon, Chu King Hung

Yang Shouzhong
- Traditional Chinese: 楊守中
- Simplified Chinese: 杨守中
Transcriptions
Standard Mandarin
- Hanyu Pinyin: Yáng Shǒuzhōng
- Wade–Giles: Yang Shou-chung
Yue: Cantonese
- Jyutping: Joeng4 Sau2 Zung1

Yang Zhenming
- Traditional Chinese: 楊振銘
- Simplified Chinese: 杨振铭
Transcriptions
Standard Mandarin
- Hanyu Pinyin: Yáng Zhènmíng
Yue: Cantonese
- Jyutping: Joeng4 Zan3 Ming4

Yang Shouzhong, born Yang Zhenming, (1910–1985) was the eldest son of Yang Chengfu and a teacher of his family's Yang style of tai chi. He is also known by the Cantonese pronunciation of his name, Yeung Sau Chung, or Yang Sau Chung.

== Biography ==
Yang Shouzhong began training in the Yang style of tai chi at age 8. By age 14, he had begun to work with his father as a teaching assistant and at age 19 he was already teaching tai chi to government officials around China. In 1949 he fled to Hong Kong where he stayed for the remainder of his life teaching privately mostly out of his home on Lockhart Road on Hong Kong Island. He appointed three disciples: Ip Tai Tak (1st and Chief Disciple (Hong Kong), Gin Soon Chu (2nd Disciple, U.S.), Chu King Hung (3rd Disciple, Europe). Yang Shouzhong is survived by his three daughters: Tai Yee, Ma Lee and Yee Li who currently also reside in Hong Kong.
