= Guang Ping Yang tai chi =

Tai chi style descended from Yang-style tai chi

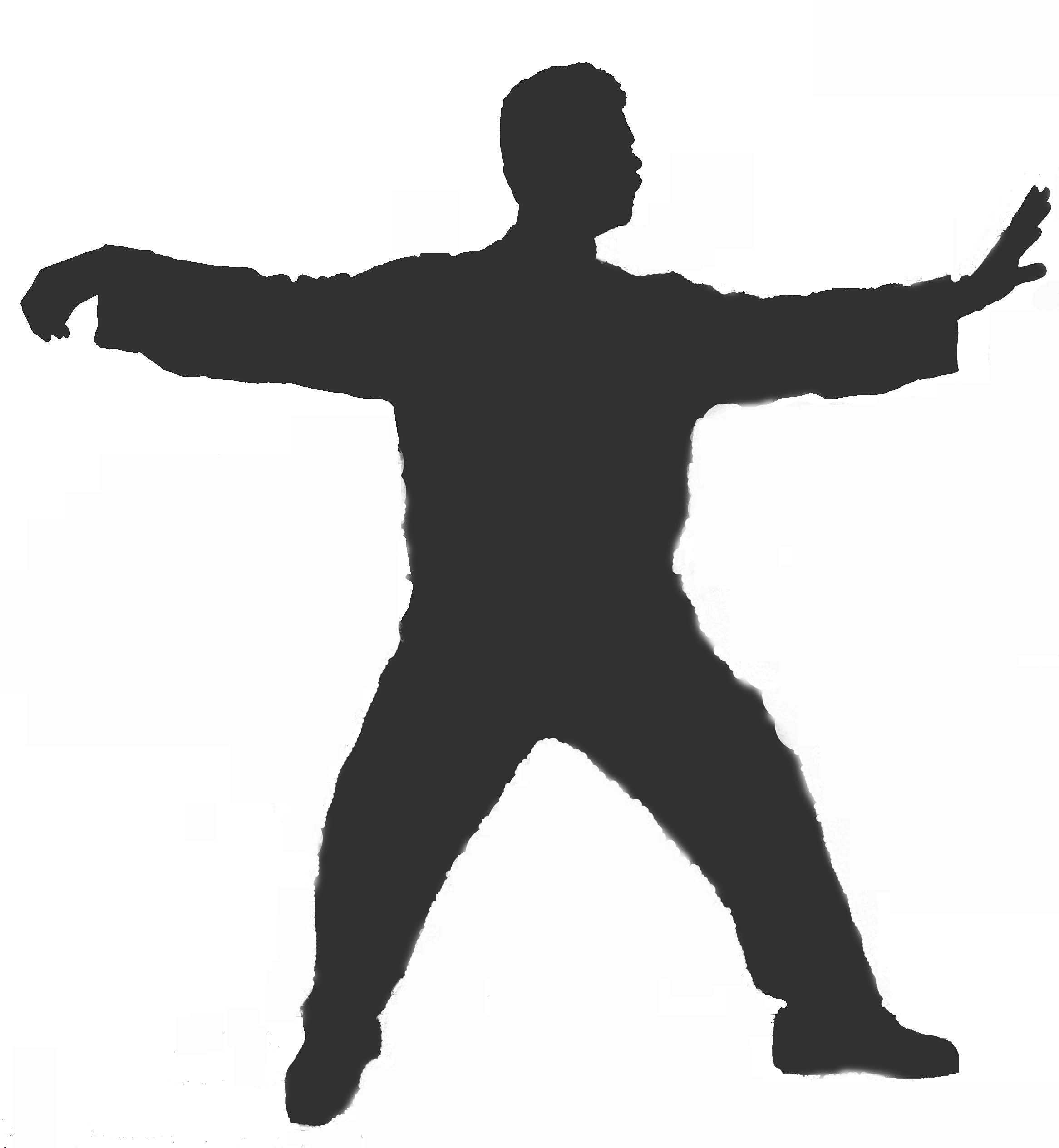
Distinctive "Single Whip" Stance of Guang Ping Yang tai chi

Guang Ping Yang tai chi (Chinese: 廣平楊氏太极拳; pinyin: Guǎngpíng Yángshì tàijíquán) is a tai chi style descended from Yang-style tai chi. It claims to combine all the positive aspects of Yang-style with qualities that added strength and versatility. Its stances are lower and wider than Yang-style, but not as pronounced as Chen-style. Guang Ping is also distinguished by as little as a 51%/49% weight difference between leading and trailing foot in certain moves. A stronger, more balanced foundation gives the student more power and greater flexibility. Guang Ping Yang tai chi also combines Xingyiquan and Baguazhang energies, which can be seen in Guang Ping's spiral force energy and projecting force energy theories. It has become known as the "lost" Yang-style tai chi form.

Kuo Lien Ying is credited with bringing Guang Ping Yang tai chi to the United States.

There appears to be controversy on whether this is a "notable and even distinct" style of tai chi, and its adherents have battled this perception for many years. Thanks to the efforts of Grandmaster Henry Look, the first president of the Guang Ping Yang Ta'i Chi Association, Guang Ping Yang tai chi has been acknowledged and listed as a separate tai chi category in many competitions and tournaments across the country, such as the Kuosho International Martial Arts Tournaments and the UC Berkeley Chinese Wushu Tournaments.

== 64 Movements of Guang Ping Yang tai chi ==
Guang Ping Yang has 64 movements, symbolically linked to the 64 hexagrams in the I Ching.

1.	Strike palm to ask Buddha
2.	Grasp Bird's Tail
3.	Single whip
4.	Stork cools its wings
5.	Brush knee and twist
6.	Deflect, parry & punch
7.	Step up, apparent closing up
8.	Carry tiger to the mountain (I)
9.	Fist under elbow
10.	Repulse the monkey
11.	Slow palm slanting flying
12.	Raise the right hand, raise the left hand
13.	Flying pull back
14.	Fan through the arm
15.	Green dragon rises from water
16.	Single whip
17.	Wave hands like clouds (I)
18.	Single whip
19.	High pat on horse (I)
20.	Separate right foot, separate left foot
21.	Turn, kick with heel
22.	Wind blows lotus leaves
23.	Finger block up with punch
24.	Turn, kick two feet upward
25.	Step in, deflect, parry & punch
26.	Retreat, arms beside body
27.	Left foot kicks up and forward
28.	Turn, kick with heel
29.	Step in, deflect, parry & punch
30.	Apparent closing up
31.	Carry tiger to the mountain (II)
32.	Chop opponent with fist
33.	Diagonal single whip
34.	Part the wild horse's mane
35.	Diagonal single whip
36.	Fair lady works the shuttle
37.	Step up, grasp the bird's tail
38.	Single whip
39.	Wave hands like clouds (I)
40.	Single whip, moving down
41.	Golden cock stands on one leg
42.	Repulse the monkey
43.	Slow palm slanting flying
44.	Raise the right hand, raise the left hand
45.	Flying pulling back
46.	Fan through the arm
47.	Wind blasts the ears
48.	Cannon through the sky
49.	Single whip
50.	Wave hands like clouds (II)
51.	Single whip
52.	High pat on horse (II)
53.	Cross wave of lotus, downward punch
54.	Step up, grasp the bird's tail
55.	Single whip
56.	Wave hands like clouds (II)
57.	Single whip moving down
58.	Step up to form seven stars
59.	Retreat, ride the tiger
60.	Slanting body, turn to the moon
61.	Cross wave of lotus foot
62.	Bend the bow, shoot the tiger
63.	Grasp the bird's tail right & left
64.	Grand Terminus

== History ==
The Guang Ping form is traced back to the great tai chi Master Yang Luchan (1799–1872), who had been adopted by the Chen family and had learned the Chen-style tai chi from them. Yang Luchan moved his family from the Chen village to the town of Guang Ping, and developed Yang-style tai chi. The stances of this modified form were not as low as the Chen-style tai chi form, with a combination of hard and soft styles, long and small circles and incorporated double jump kicks, and other wide sweeping kicks. The movements were long and deep, more energetic, with more apparent martial combat character. This Yang-style tai chi became known as Guang Ping Yang tai chi.

Yang Luchan taught his son, Yang Banhou, the Guang Ping Yang tai chi. Yang Banhou was reportedly the official teacher for the Imperial court of the Manchus. The indigenous Chinese, known as the Han, had been subjugated by the Manchus and therefore Yang Banhou did not want to pass down the family's true art to them. Also, the Manchurians were aristocrats and were not inclined to the more strenuous exercises, so Yang Banhou adapted his father's Guang Ping form to be more subtle and taught them a very elegant, middle-to-small frame form. This is the Yang-style tai chi style that has come to be known as the Beijing Yang-style. Yang Banhou secretly taught his father's form (the Guang Ping style) only to select students who were not his family, who then taught it to only a few of their students and the art was subsequently lost to the Yang family.

Yang Banhou's lineage-holding disciple was Wang Jiaoyu, a Han (native Chinese) and a stableman for the Imperial family. As the legend goes, one day Yang Banhou heard a noise over the fence and looked to see Wang Jiaoyu practicing the Guang Ping form. He confronted Wang Jiaoyu and demanded an explanation. Wang Jiaoyu told him he had been secretly watching Yang Banhou practicing the Guang Ping form. Yang Banhou told Wang Jiaoyu that if he could put his chin to his toe in the chin-to-toe exercise within 100 days, he would teach him. Jiaoyu succeeded. Since Wang Jiaoyu was a Han, Yang took Wang as his student and trained him in the secret Guang Ping style, and made him promise not to teach this art as long as the dynasty was in power.

Wang Jiaoyu kept this promise, and only began teaching Guang Ping Yang tai chi much later in his life.

Kuo Lien Ying learned the form from Wang Jiaoyu. Wang Jiaoyu, purportedly 112 years of age at the time, accepted Kuo as one of very few disciples. From Wang's teaching, it is said that Kuo learned all the true skill and essence of Guang Ping Yang tai chi.

Kuo Lien Ying moved to San Francisco in the early 1960s and opened one of the first tai chi studios in America with the help of Sifu David Chin. Sifu Chin first practiced with Kuo on the rooftop of the Sam Wong Hotel in Chinatown. Sifu Chin is the only living student of Kuo's to learn a second set of what he asserts Sifu Kuo called "the Original Yang t'ai chi," and that this "Application Set" is crucial for the development of the boxing art that Kuo passed on. Sifu Chin taught the Application Set to Tim Smith (Raleigh, NC) in 1996. Prior to Kuo moving to America, he taught Kwok Wo Ngai the complete system as well. Kwok fled the Chinese Communist Revolution like Kuo and also came to America. He began teaching in New Jersey where he was known as Peter Kwok.

== Guang Ping Yang Tai Chi Association ==
The Guang Ping Yang Tai Chi Association was formed In 1997 to honor the memory of Sifu Kuo Lien Ying and in commemoration of his unselfish sharing of his many skills. The mission of the Association is to promote, perpetuate, develop interest in, and preserve the quality of Guang Ping Yang style tai chi throughout the world, and to provide support for research and education in Guang Ping Yang tai chi.

Guang Ping Yang Tai Chi Association Honorary Chairmen: Y.C. Chiang, Henry Look

Guang Ping Yang Tai Chi Association Past Presidents: Henry Look, Donald Rubbo, Nina (Sugawara) Deerfield, Nick D’Antoni, Dominick Ruggieri, Randy Elia, Lawrence Riddle, Lucy Bartimole, Grace Cheng, Valarie Prince Gabel, David Chosid, JoAnna Schoon

Current President, Guang Ping Yang Tai Chi Association: Matt Peterson

== Guang Ping Yang tai chi's link to World Tai Chi Day ==
In 1998, Guang Ping Yang tai chi teachers, Bill Douglas and his Hong Kong born wife Angela Wong Douglas, organized what CNN News dubbed the "largest gathering of its kind outside China" in Kansas City. 200 people gathered for a mass public exhibition of the Guang Ping Yang Style Tai Chi form. The iconic photo of that first World Tai Chi Day event was of 200 people joined in the final movement of the Guang Ping Yang Tai Chi form, Grand Terminus. That Guang Ping Yang Tai Chi image has appeared in newspapers worldwide, including in Russia's Omsk Daily Newspaper, and Hong Kong's South China Morning Post in articles about World Tai Chi Day. The global event, World Tai Chi Day, was co-founded by Guang Ping Yang Tai Chi students and teachers, Bill Douglas, and his wife, Angela Wong Douglas, who are 7 generations removed from Yang Style Tai Chi founder Yang Luchan, and 2 generations from Guang Ping Yang Tai Chi Master Kuo Lien Ying, studying under Jennifer Booth and Gil Messenger, who studied under Master Kuo and with Kuo's student Master Henry Look. Today, World Tai Chi Day is celebrated annually in hundreds of cities in over 70 nations, and has been officially proclaimed or recognized by government officials and body's worldwide, including Brazil's National Council of Deputy's, the Senates of California, New York, and Puerto Rico, and Governors of 22 U.S. States. It has been covered by China's Xinhua News Agency; Agency France Presse TV; Associated Press Television; BBC Television; CNN; FOX News; The New York Times; Wall Street Journal; USA Weekend; BBC Radio; The South China Morning Post, and media worldwide.

== A mnemonic of thirteen tai chi movements ==
Let no one esteem lightly the Thirteen Movements

But bear in mind that your consciousness of them commences in the waist,
In performance, care must be exercised regarding your transposition
from one stance to another,
the twists and turns in each movement, and the distribution of blanks and
substantives in a given movement,
While keeping the chi freely circulating throughout your whole body.
All changes and motions are conceived and touched off in the stillness of absolute quietude,
Hence motion and action are kindred to rest and inaction, in other words, ultimately
indistinguishable from each other.
Likewise, the mystery of Tai-Chi Chuan is that
It is your opponent's movements that condition your own as adapted by nature
to his own undoing.
Remember to be mindful of every single move by trying to feel its meaning,
And you will eventually come into possession of the art's secrets without conscious effort.
Rivet your attention, without even a moment's interruption, onto the waist interval, and
Keep your abdomen free from tension due to food or impurities, so that
Your vitality flux (chi) may, as it were, boil and rise like steam.
Keep the lowest segments of your vertebrae central in relation to gravitation all the while,
when
Your limbs and body are gyrating with effortless nimbleness, and your head is held
buoyant as if suspended from above.
Carefully observe and investigate and convince yourself that
Your way of bending or straightening, your closing-in or throwing open should never
be as you will them to be, but as Nature wills.
A novice will require verbal instruction during the initial stages.
But practice will steer its own course and bring about its own perfection.
As to the theory and practice, i.e., the constituents and functioning of Tai-Chi Chuan,
The spirit is sovereign and the body its servant,
The end purpose of these exercises is to prolong life and endow it with the youth of eternal
spring.
Oh, sing! Oh, sing! Sing this short song of 144 Chinese characters;
Commit every single word of it to memory without exception.
Enquiries and researches that deviate from this approach

Only waste time and leave behind regrets and sighings.

From Kuo Lien Ying's book Tai-Chi Chuan in Theory and Practice

== Books ==
- The T'ai Chi Boxing Chronicle, Compiled and explained by Kuo Lien Ying, translated into English by Gordon Guttman ISBN 1-55643-177-5
- Tai-Chi Chuan in Theory and Practice, ISBN 1-55643-298-4
