= Rodell (surname) =

Rodell is a surname. Notable people with the surname include:

- Barbara Rodell (born 1945/1946), American actress
- Fred Rodell (1907–1980), American law professor
- Jeremiah J. Rodell (1921–2015), United States Air Force brigadier general
- Scott M. Rodell, American martial artist, author, and teacher of Yang-style taijiquan
