= Chu Guiting =

Chinese martial artist

Chu Guiting 褚桂亭
- Born: 26 July 1892; Danzhou town, Renqiu County, Hebei Province, China
- Died: 16 February 1977 (aged 84)
- Style: Neijia; Xingyiquan, Baguazhang, Yang-style tai chi

Chu Guiting (Chinese: 褚桂亭; pinyin: Chǔ Guìtíng; 26 July 1892 – 16 February 1977) was a Chinese martial artist.

In 1928 when a competition in Nanjing was halted after two deaths, he was one of 12 martial artists who have historically been remembered as the champions.
