= Chen Youben =

Chinese tai chi practitioner

Chen Youben 陳有本
- Born: 1780; Chenjiagou, Henan, China
- Died: 1858
- Nationality: Chinese
- Style: Chen-style tai chi (6th gen. Chen-style)

Other information
- Notable relatives: Chen Changxing, Chen Wangting
- Notable students: Chen Qingping

Chen Youben
- Chinese: 陳有本
Transcriptions
Standard Mandarin
- Hanyu Pinyin: Chén Yǒuběn

Chen Youben (陳有本; 1780–1858) was a 14th-generation descendant and 6th-generation master of the famed Chen family and is considered to be an influential martial artist and teacher of Chen-style tai chi.

Chen Youben was the first teacher of Chen Qingping (1795-1868) and taught Chen Youlun, Chen Fengzhang, Chen Sande, Chen Tingdong, and his late, older brother’s sons, Chen Zhongshen (1809-1891) and Chen Jishen (b. 1809). He also helped prepare Chen Gengyun to have sufficient martial skills to travel with Chen Changxing’s, his father's caravan escort service.

Chen Youben is credited by some with the creation of what Chen Ziming (1932) called the "xinjia" (new frame) as opposed to the "laojia" (old frame) referring to the traditional, seven-form system of Chen Wanting. This "new frame" is now equated with the "Xiaojia" (small frame) within the modern Chen Family routines.

Additionally, a tai chi evolution theory points to Chen Gengyun who learned enlarged movements and emphasized explosive power (Bao Fa Li) in order to be prepared to accompany Chen Changxing's caravan escort service. If the theory is correct, as Gengyun's teacher, Chen Youben was also the creator of the "Dajia" (Large Frame) within the modern Chen Family routines.

== Tai chi lineage tree with Chen-style focus ==
Chen Youben (1780-1858)
