= Zhang Qinlin =

Zhang Qinlin 張欽霖
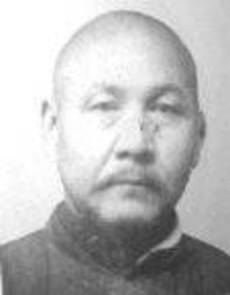
- Born: 1888; Xingtai, Hebei, China
- Died: 1967 (aged 78–79)
- Nationality: Chinese
- Style: Yangjia Michuan tai chi

Zhang Qinlin
- Chinese: 張欽霖
Transcriptions
Standard Mandarin
- Hanyu Pinyin: Zhāng Qīnlín

Zhang Qinlin (1888–1967) was an influential martial artist, teacher, and lineage holder of the Yangjia Michuan style of tai chi. In 1929, Zhang won the All China Fighting Championship in the unarmed division.

== Early life and training ==
Zhang was born in Xingtai County, Hebei province, China in 1888, into a poor family. After his parents died while he was still young, Zhang ventured out at the age of 14 to find a martial arts teacher. He eventually sought out the nearby Yang family household to learn Yang-style tai chi. There he began his martial arts studies with Yang Chengfu under the supervision of the latter's father, Yang Jianhou. During the initial years of Zhang’s training with Chengfu, he was only taught the publicly known elements of the Yang style disseminated to students outside the Yang family. After Zhang successfully fought a challenge match against a famous martial artist from southern China, Wan Mou, the elder Yang decided the young student had earned the right to learn the Yangjia Michuan teachings. Thereafter, Jianhou had Zhang report to his personal quarters every night between the hours of 3 a.m. and 5 a.m. while the rest of the compound slept. It was then that Jianhou taught Zhang the Yangjia Michuan tai chi system in addition to his regular daily training.

== Competition and teaching ==
In 1929, the central Chinese government sponsored the All China Fighting Championship, a general competition in Chinese boxing. Each province was to send two participants – one for the armed division, one for the unarmed division—to Nanjing, the then capitol of China, to compete. Zhang, whose occupation as a fur merchant had required that he move to Shanxi in 1925, entered and won the regional competition for that province. According to the history provided by his student, Wang Yen-nien, Zhang went on to win the national championship in the unarmed division later that year. However, there is no written record of Zhang having competed in any national tournament, let alone win one.

After Zhang moved to Shanxi, he began search for a student to whom he could pass on the Yang family teachings. In all, Zhang is known to have taught ten students, although only a subset of those was taught anything beyond the publicly known Yang style. Wang Yen-nien, who moved to Taipei, Taiwan in 1949 where he lived until his death in May 2008, was the second and last student of Zhang’s to receive the entirety of the Yangjia Michuan tai chi system.
