= Fu Zhongwen =

Tai chi teacher

Fu Zhongwen 傅鈡文
- Born: 1903; Yongnian, Hebei, China
- Died: 1994 (aged 90–91)
- Nationality: Chinese
- Style: Yang-style tai chi (4th gen. Yang)

Other information
- Notable students: Fu Shengyuan, Xie Bingcan, James Fu Qingquan, Alice Bei Dong, Li Rong Mei
- Website: Fu family website

Fu Zhongwen
- Chinese: 傅鈡文
Transcriptions
Standard Mandarin
- Hanyu Pinyin: Fù Zhōngwén

Fu Zhongwen (1903–1994) was a respected tai chi teacher and author from China. From an early age, he had been a disciple of Yang Chengfu, and later a family member as he married Zou Kuei Cheng, the great-granddaughter of Yang Chien-hou.

Fu Zhongwen was born in Yongnian, Hebei province. As a child, he would watch people practise tai chi and imitate their moves before beginning his training with Master Yang Chengfu at the young age of 9. Zhongwen’s personal diligence and application in learning tai chi saw him advance rapidly in the knowledge and expertise of tai chi.

As Zhongwen matured, he accompanied Yang in his travels around China from Wuhan to Guangzhou, demonstrating tai chi and helping to teach along the way. Yang Chengfu would teach and Zhongwen would demonstrate. Fu Zhongwen would often accept challenges from other martial artists, not once failing to uphold his master's honour.

Fu Zhongwen was often called upon by his master to represent him in pushing hands competitions and he earned the reputation of being an undefeatable opponent. So highly regarded was he by his peers, that Yang's first disciple Chen Weiming wrote a letter to him after Chengfu's death, acknowledging the excellence of Zhongwen's accomplishment and the accuracy with which he reflected their master’s art.

In 1944, Fu Zhongwen founded the Yongnian Tai Chi Association in order to carry on the work of his master in spreading tai chi to all people. When he founded the Yongnian Association, he selected diligence, perseverance, respect, and sincerity as their motto. Fu Zhongwen lived his life according to the above motto. The reason he chose Yongnian as the name was because Yong Nian in Chinese means longevity - the main purpose of establishing the association was to teach tai chi, allowing the people to benefit from practicing tai chi to live longer.

As the Association grew in Shanghai, classes often included more than eighty students. Fu Zhongwen continued to supervise the group, while delegating responsibility to select disciples and assistants, such as Xie Bingcan.

In 1959, the PRC featured Fu Zhongwen’s tai chi sabre in its international sports publication. The PRC also published his book, entitled Yang Family Tai Chi, in 1963.

In 1972, the Tongji University in Shanghai carried out a scientific research on the therapeutic value of tai chi on patients with Fu Zhongwen and his son Fu Shengyuan as instructors. After 3 months, the results achieved with some medical conditions including heart diseases, spleen dysfunction, arthritis and insomnia. This propelled the Ministry of Sports to officially recognize the therapeutic value of tai chi.

Fu Zhongwen was the type of man who was willing to teach tai chi to whoever wanted to learn for free; the only benefit to him was the knowledge that people were doing tai chi and gaining health from it. Fu Zhongwen is a true legacy in the tai chi world.

Fu Zhongwen had dedicated his life to practicing and teaching tai chi. He was voted as one of the One Hundred Living Treasures of China and it was a great loss to the martial arts world and a greater loss to his family when he died in Shanghai on September 25, 1994 at age 92.

His son Fu Shengyuan (傅聲遠, 1931-2017) and grandson James Fu Qingquan (傅清泉) have continued his quest to spread Yang tai chi throughout the world.
