= 103-form Yang family tai chi =

Prescribed sequence of moves

103-form Yang family tai chi, also called the Traditional Form (or, Long Form), is a prescribed sequence of moves used to practice Yang-style tai chi.

== Tai chi forms ==
The different slow motion solo form training sequences of tai chi are the best known manifestation of tai chi for the general public. In English, they are usually called the hand form or just the form; in Mandarin it is usually called quan (Chinese: 拳; pinyin: quán; Wade–Giles: ch'üan^{2}). They are usually performed slowly and are designed to string together an inventory of important techniques, and to promote relaxation, as well as other foundational principles.

== Duration ==
This sequence of moves, when performed at its prescribed speed, usually takes approximately 25 to 30 minutes to complete.

== Differences between schools ==
The following is an English translation from Chinese of the form list used by the current Yang family teachers. Other Yang style schools may have significantly different enumeration schemes. The moves can also add up to 85, 88, 108, 113 or 150 depending on how they are counted. The book called Yang Shi Taijiquan ("Yang-style tai chi"), by Fu Zhongwen, breaks the form into each of its discrete movements.

== Yang-style 103-Form list of Postures ==
The 103 postures of the Yang family style of tai chi are as follows:

	Chinese	Pinyin	English
	第一段		Section 1
1.	预 备	Yùbèi	Preparation Form
2.	起式	Qǐ shì	Beginning
3.	揽雀尾	Lǎn què wěi	Grasp the Bird's Tail
4.	单鞭	Dān biān	Single Whip
5.	提手上势	Tí shǒu shàng shì	Raise Hands and Step Forward
6.	白鹤亮翅	Bái hè liàng chì	White Crane Spreads its Wings
7.	左搂膝拗步	Zuǒ lōu xī ǎo bù	Left Brush Knee and Push
8.	手挥琵琶	Shǒu huī pípá	Hand Strums the Lute
9.	左搂膝拗步	Zuǒ lōu xī ǎo bù	Left Brush Knee and Push
10.	右搂膝拗步	Yòu lōu xī ǎo bù	Right Brush Knee and Push
11.	左搂膝拗步	Zuǒ lōu xī ǎo bù	Left Brush Knee and Push
12.	手挥琵琶	Shǒu huī pípá	Hand Strums the Lute
13.	左搂膝拗步	Zuǒ lōu xī ǎo bù	Left Brush Knee and Push
14.	进步搬拦捶	Jìn bù bān lán chuí	Step Forward, Parry, Block, and Punch
15.	如封似闭	Rú fēng shì bì	Apparent Close Up
16.	十字手	Shí zì shǒu	Cross Hands
	第二段		Section 2
17.	抱虎归山	Bào hǔ guī shān	Embrace the Tiger and Return to Mountain
18.	肘底捶	Zhǒu dǐ chuí	Fist Under Elbow
19.	左倒撵猴	Zuǒ dào niǎn hóu	Step Back and Repulse the Monkey, Left
20.	右倒撵猴	Yòu dào niǎn hóu	Step Back and Repulse the Monkey, Right
21.	左倒撵猴	Zuǒ dào niǎn hóu	Step Back and Repulse the Monkey, Left
22.	斜飞式	Xié fēi shì	Diagonal Flying
23.	提手上势	Tí shǒu shàng shì	Raise Hands and Step Forward
24.	白鹤亮翅	Bái hè liàng chì	White Crane Spreads its Wings
25.	左搂膝拗步	Zuǒ lōu xī ǎo bù	Left Brush Knee and Push
26.	海底针	Hǎi dǐ zhēn	Needle at Sea Bottom
27.	扇通背	Shàn tōng bèi	Fan Through the Back
28.	转身撇身捶	Zhuǎn shēn piē shēn chuí	Turn Body and Chop with Fist
29.	进步搬拦捶	Jìn bù bān lán chuí	Step Forward, Parry, Block, and Punch
30.	上步揽雀尾	Shàng bù lǎn què wěi	Step Forward and Grasp the Bird's Tail
31.	单鞭	Dān biān	Single Whip
32.	云手	Yún shǒu	Cloud Hands (1)
33.	云手	Yún shǒu	Cloud Hands (2)
34.	云手	Yún shǒu	Cloud Hands (3)
35.	单鞭	Dān biān	Single Whip
36.	高探马	Gāo tàn mǎ	High Pat on Horse
37.	右分脚	Yòu fēn jiǎo	Right Separation Kick
38.	左分脚	Zuǒ fèn jiǎo	Left Separation Kick
39.	转身左蹬脚	Zhuǎn shēn zuǒ dēng jiǎo	Turn Body and Left Heel Kick
40.	左搂膝拗步	Zuǒ lōu xī ǎo bù	Left Brush Knee and Push
41.	右搂膝拗步	Yòu lōu xī ǎo bù	Right Brush Knee and Push
42.	进步栽锤	Jìn bù zāi chuí	Step Forward and Punch Down
43.	转身撇身锤	Zhuǎn shēn piē shēn chuí	Turn Body and Chop with Fist
44.	进步搬拦锤	Jìn bù bān lán chuí	Step Forward, Parry, Block, and Punch
45.	右蹬脚	Yòu dēng jiǎo	Right Heel Kick
46.	左打虎式	Zuǒ dǎ hǔ shì	Left Strike Tiger
47.	右打虎式	Yòu dǎ hǔ shì	Right Strike Tiger
48.	回身右蹬脚	Huí shēn yòu dēng jiǎo	Turn Body and Right Heel Kick
49.	双峰灌耳	Shuāng fēng guàn ěr	Twin Fists Strike Opponents Ears
50.	左蹬脚	Zuǒ dēng jiǎo	Left Heel Kick
51.	转身右蹬脚	Zhuǎn shēn yòu dēng jiǎo	Turn Body and Right Heel Kick
52.	进步搬拦锤	Jìn bù bān lán chuí	Step Forward, Parry, Block, and Punch
53.	如封似闭	Rú fēng shì bì	Apparent Close Up
54.	十字手	Shí zì shǒu	Cross Hands
	第三段		Section 3
55.	抱虎归山	Bào hǔ guī shān	Embrace the Tiger and Return to Mountain
56.	斜单鞭	Xié dān biān	Diagonal Single Whip
57.	右野马分鬃	Yòu yě mǎ fēn zōng	Parting Wild Horse's Mane, Right
58.	左野马分鬃	Zuǒ yě mǎ fēn zōng	Parting Wild Horse's Mane, Left
59.	右野马分鬃	Yòu yě mǎ fēn zōng	Parting Wild Horse's Mane, Right
60.	揽雀尾	Lǎn què wěi	Grasp the Bird's Tail
61.	单鞭	Dān biān	Single Whip
62.	玉女穿梭	Yù nǚ chuān suō	Fair Lady Works at Shuttles
63.	揽雀尾	Lǎn què wěi	Grasp the Bird's Tail
64.	单鞭	Dān biān	Single Whip
65.	云手	Yún shǒu	Cloud Hands (1)
66.	云手	Yún shǒu	Cloud Hands (2)
67.	云手	Yún shǒu	Cloud Hands (3)
68.	单鞭	Dān biān	Single Whip
69.	蛇身下势	She shen Xià shì	Snake Creeps Down
70.	左金鸡独立	Zuǒ jīn jī dú lì	Golden Rooster Stands on One Leg, Left
71.	右金鸡独立	Yòu jīn jī dú lì	Golden Rooster Stands on One Leg, Right
72.	左倒撵猴	Zuǒ dào niǎn hóu	Step Back and Repulse the Monkey, Left
73.	右倒撵猴	Yòu dào niǎn hóu	Step Back and Repulse the Monkey, Right
74.	左倒撵猴	Zuǒ dào niǎn hóu	Step Back and Repulse the Monkey, Left
75.	斜飞势	Xié fēi shì	Diagonal Flying
76.	提手上势	Tí shǒu shàng shì	Raise Hands and Step Forward
77.	白鹤亮翅	Bái hè liàng chì	White Crane Spreads its Wings
78.	左搂膝拗步	Zuǒ lōu xī ǎo bù	Left Brush Knee and Push
79.	海底针	Hǎi dǐ zhēn	Needle at Sea Bottom
80.	扇通背	Shàn tōng bèi	Fan Through the Back
81.	转身白蛇吐信	Zhuǎn shēn bái shé tǔ xìn	Turn Body and White Snake Spits out Tongue
82.	进步搬拦捶	Jìn bù bān lán chuí	Step Forward, Parry, Block, and Punch
83.	上步揽雀尾	Shàng bù lǎn què wěi	Step Forward and Grasp the Bird's Tail
84.	单鞭	Dān biān	Single Whip
85.	云手	Yún shǒu	Cloud Hands (1)
86.	云手	Yún shǒu	Cloud Hands (2)
87.	云手	Yún shǒu	Cloud Hands (3)
88.	单鞭	Dān biān	Single Whip
89.	高探马穿掌	Gāo tàn mǎ chuān zhǎng	High Pat On Horse with Palm Thrust
90.	十字腿	Shí zì tuǐ	Cross Kick
91.	进步指裆锤	Jìn bù zhǐ dāng chuí	Step Forward and Punch Groin
92.	上步揽雀尾	Shàng bù lǎn què wěi	Step Forward and Grasp the Bird's Tail
93.	单鞭	Dān biān	Single Whip
94.	蛇身下势	She shen Xià shì	Snake Creeps Down
95.	上步七星	Shàng bù qī xīng	Step Forward Seven Stars
96.	退步跨虎	Tuì bù kuà hǔ	Step Back and Ride the Tiger
97.	转身摆莲	Zhuǎn shēn bǎi lián	Turn Body and Swing Over Lotus
98.	弯弓射虎	Wān gōng shè hǔ	Bend the Bow and Shoot the Tiger
99.	进步搬拦捶	Jìn bù bān lán chuí	Step Forward, Parry, Block, and Punch
100.	如封似闭	Rú fēng shì bì	Apparent Close Up
101.	十字手	Shí zì shǒu	Cross Hands
102.	收式	Shōu shì	Closing
103.	合太极	He Tai Ji	Close tai ji

== See also ==
- Two-person Pushing Hands
