= Chen Changxing =

Chinese tai chi master

Chen Changxing 陈长兴
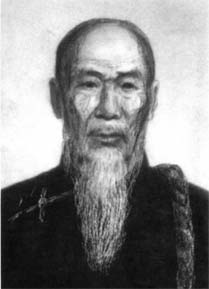
- Born: 1771; Chen Village, Henan, China
- Died: 1853 (aged 81–82)
- Nationality: Chinese
- Style: Chen-style tai chi (6th generation)

Other information
- Notable relatives: Chen Youben, Chen Wangting
- Notable students: Yang Luchan, Chen Gengyun (陈耕耘)

Chen Changxing
- Traditional Chinese: 陳長興
- Simplified Chinese: 陈长兴
Transcriptions
Standard Mandarin
- Hanyu Pinyin: Chén Chángxīng
- Wade–Giles: Ch'en Chang-hsing

Chen Changxing (Chinese: 陳長興; Wade–Giles: Ch'en Chang-hsing; 1771–1853) was a tai chi master belonging to the 6th generation of Chen-style tai chi. He is most famous as the teacher of Yang Luchan, but there is much disagreement over which style of martial art Chen actually taught Yang Luchan.

Some schools of thought suggest that Chen Changxing was a maverick who practiced and taught a style of martial art that was not part of the Chen family martial arts tradition, and that was passed to him either directly or indirectly from a tai chi master known as Jiang Fa. Some other schools of thought suggest that Chen Changxing re-worked two or more of the traditional Chen family routines into his own style and then taught it to Yang Luchan and others. Both schools successfully explain why the tai chi that Yang Luchan's descendants now practice is substantially different from the modern Chen routines, but neither theory can be completely substantiated and thus much controversy remains. At the same time, the members of the Chen clan believe that not much changed in Chen tai chi from the times preceding Chen Changxing, nor after him besides, perhaps, the sequence of the movements and their grouping in to the forms. The differences between Chen tai chi and other big styles are mostly attributed to the independent development of non-Chen styles in the modern and pre-modern eras. The visual representation of the Sun style, for instance, looks strikingly different from the Yang style, which in its turn mirrors the Chen style to a high degree, both in the appearance and movements names.

Chen Changxing is said to have been of an irreverent character and was given the nickname "Mr Ancestral Tablet" due to the directness of his posture. In "The Genealogy of the Chen Family" he is noted as a martial arts instructor, but the detail of the style he taught is not present.
