= Single whip =

Tai chi posture

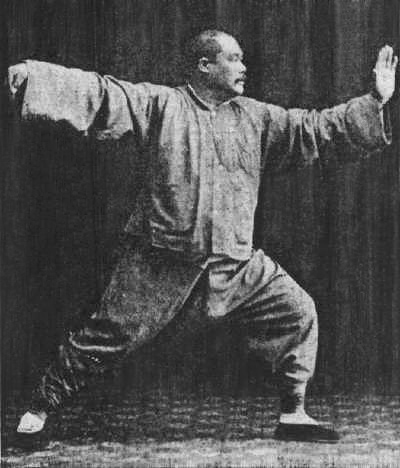
Yang Chengfu in the single whip posture c. 1930

Single Whip (Chinese: 單鞭; pinyin: dān biān) is a common posture found in most forms of tai chi. Typically at the end of the posture the left hand is in a palm outward push and the right hand held most commonly in the form of a hook or closed fist. Notable exceptions are the Single Whip forms found in the Sun-style and Wu (Hao)-style, which finishes with both hands open and palms outward.

Single Whip is one of the movements/postures most repeated in the solo training forms, such as tai chi. Its first appearance in most forms follows the Grasp Sparrow's Tail sequence (peng, lu, ji, an) and is seen later in Snake Creeps Down. There is also a posture in the Wu style sword form called Single Whip Fusing Throat.

The martial applications of Single Whip are many. There are various strikes, throws, changeups (using one hand to create an opening so that the other can strike) and kicks derived from this posture trained by different schools.

== See also ==
- List of tai chi forms
