= Chen Jingbo =

Chinese politician

Chen Jingbo (1916 - October 18, 2004, Chinese: 陈竞波), was a native of Teng County, Shandong. He was an official of the People's Republic of China.

== Biography ==
Chen Jingbo took part in the Chinese Communist Revolution in his early years, and served as an officer, deputy company commander, instructor, political director of the regiment, and deputy director of the political department of the Yu-Wan-Su military district (Chinese: 豫皖苏军区分区).

After the founding of the People's Republic of China, he served as minister of the Enemy Work Department of the 18th Army of the Second Field Army, minister of the United Front Work Department of the CCP Tibet Work Committee, deputy secretary general of the Preparatory Committee for the Tibet Autonomous Region, secretary general of the People's Committee of the Tibet Autonomous Region, member of the Standing Committee of the CCP Tibet Autonomous Region Committee, and deputy director of the Standing Committee of the Third People's Congress of the Tibet Autonomous Region. In 1958, during the rectification and Anti-Rightist Campaign, Bai Yunfeng, Chen Jingbo and Xia Zhongyuan were labeled parts of so-called "Fan Ming Anti-Party Group", and Chen Jingbo and Xia Zhongyuan were regarded as committing the error of right-degree opportunism, and were given internal and administrative punishments by the party respectively. In May 1980, the CCP Organization Department made a review conclusion for the Fan Ming issue and vindicated Chen Jingbo.

On October 18, 2004, Chen Jingbo died in Zhengzhou.
