= Yang Chengfu =

Chinese martial artist (1883–1936)

Yang Chengfu 杨澄甫
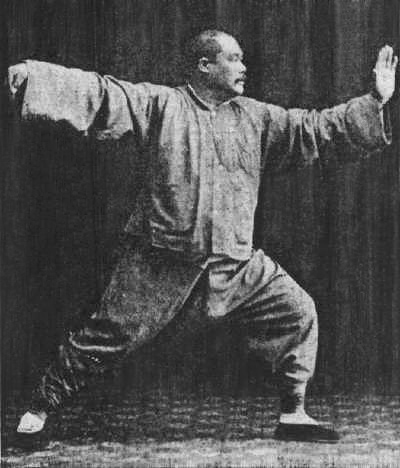
- Yang (date unknown)
- Born: Yang Zhaoqing (杨兆清); 1883
- Died: 1936 (aged 52–53)
- Style: Yang-style tai chi

Other information
- Notable students: Yang Shouzhong; Yang Zhenduo; Dong Yingjie; Cheng Man-chʻing; Zhang Qinlin

Yang Chengfu
- Traditional Chinese: 楊澄甫
- Simplified Chinese: 杨澄甫
Transcriptions
Standard Mandarin
- Hanyu Pinyin: Yáng Chéngfǔ
- Wade–Giles: Yang^{2} Chʻeng^{2}fu^{3}
- IPA: [jǎŋ ʈʂʰə̌ŋfù]
Yue: Cantonese
- Yale Romanization: Yeùhng chìhng fú
- Jyutping: Joeng^{4} cing^{4} fu^{2}
- IPA: [jœ̏ːŋ tɕʰɪ̏ŋ fǔː]
Southern Min
- Hokkien POJ: IûⁿTêng-po͘

Yang Chengfu (1883–1936) was a teacher of Yang-style tai chi, a Chinese martial art. He was the son of Yang Jianhou, grandson of Yang Luchan, brother of Yang Shaohou, and father of Yang Shouzhong and Yang Zhenduo. His students included Dong Yingjie, and Cheng Man-chʻing.
