= Yang-style tai chi =

Chinese martial art

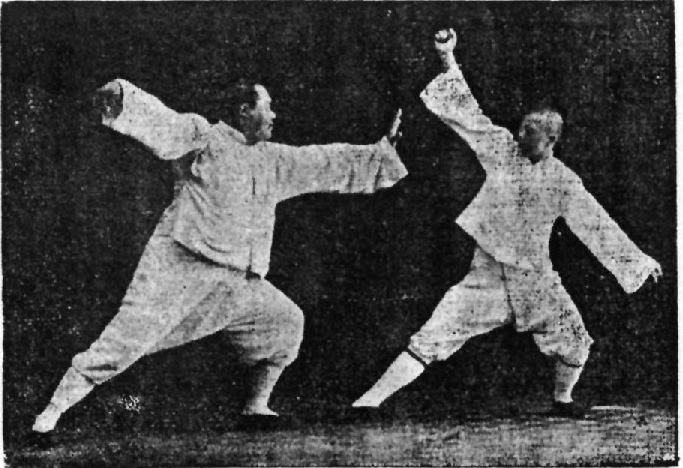
- Yang Chengfu utilizing the single whip technique.
- Date founded: 1st half of 19th century
- Country of origin: China
- Founder: Yang Luchan
- Current head: Zhao YouBin
- Arts taught: Tai chi
- Ancestor arts: Chen-style tai chi
- Descendant arts: Guang Ping Yang tai chi Yangjia Michuan tai chi Wu (Hao)-style tai chi Wu-style tai chi
- Practitioners: Yang Jianhou; Yang Chengfu; Cheng Man-ch'ing; Dong Yingjie; Zhang Qinlin; Zhao YouBin; Chu Guiting

Yang-style tai chi (Chinese: 楊氏太极拳; pinyin: Yángshì tàijíquán) is one of the five primary families of tai chi. Including its variations, it is the most popular and widely practised style of tai chi in the world today. It is second in terms of seniority, after Chen-style tai chi.

== History ==
The Yang family first became involved in the study of tai chi in the early 19th century. The founder of the Yang-style was Yang Luchan, who studied under Chen Changxing starting in 1820. Yang became a teacher in his own right, and his subsequent expression of tai chi became known as the Yang-style, and directly led to the development of three other major styles of tai chi (see below). Yang Luchan (and some would say the art of tai chi, in general) came to prominence as a result of his being hired by the Chinese Imperial family to teach tai chi to the elite Palace Battalion of the Imperial Guards in 1850, a position he held until his death.

Yang Luchan passed on his art to:

- his second son, the oldest son to live to maturity, Yang Banhou, who was also retained as a martial arts instructor by the Chinese Imperial family. Yang Banhou's first student was Wu Quanyou, a Manchu Banner officer. Wu had previously trained under Yang Luchan, but Yang Banhou became his formal teacher. Wu and his son, Wu Jianquan, would go on to co-found Wu-style tai chi.
- his third son Yang Jianhou, who passed it to his sons, Yang Shaohou and Yang Chengfu and Niu Chunming (1881–1961).
- Wu Yuxiang, who went on to develop Wu (Hao)-style. Wu (Hao)-style, in turn, would become the ancestor of Sun-style tai chi.

Yang Jianhou passed on the middle frame long form, sometimes called the 2nd generation Yang form or the Yang Jianhou form, to his disciples who still practice this more martial form. It is seen as more reminiscent of Chen style for which it is closer to in time as well as form than the Yang Chengfu form or 3rd generation styles. Yang Chengfu removed the vigorous fa jin ("release of power") from the Hand (solo) Form, as well as the energetic jumping, stamping, and other abrupt movements in order to emphasise the Da jia (大架 large frame style), but retained them in the Weapons (sword, saber, staff, and spear) forms. The Hand Form has slow, steady, expansive and soft movements suitable for general practitioners. Thus, Yang Chengfu is largely responsible for standardizing and popularizing the Yang-style tai chi widely practised today. (Note: Yang Chengfu moved to Shanghai in the 1920s, teaching there until the end of his life. His descendants are still teaching in schools associated with their family internationally. Dong Yingjie, Chen Weiming, Fu Zhongwen, Li Yaxuan (李雅轩, 1894–1976), and Cheng Man-ch'ing were famous students of Yang Chengfu. Each of them taught extensively, founding groups teaching tai chi to this day. Cheng Man-ch'ing, perhaps the most famous outside of China, significantly shortened and simplified the traditional forms Yang taught him.)

=== Modern short forms ===
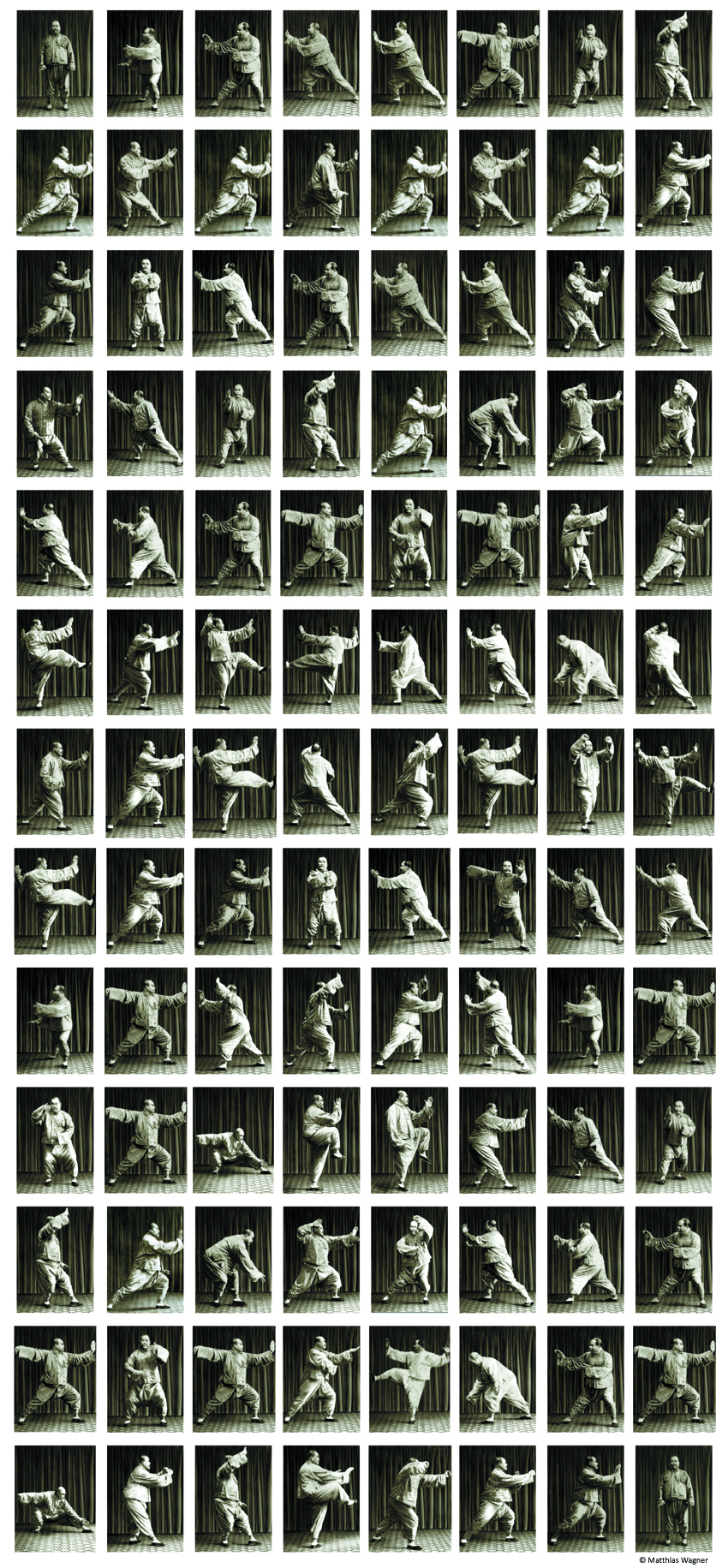
104 pictures showing Yang Chengfu performing the tai chi form.

Yang Chengfu developed his own shortened "large frame" version of the Yang long Form, in order to make it easier to teach to modern students who are busy with modern life. Now the most popular long tai chi form in the world, the classic Yang Chengfu form retains the health and self-defense benefits of the original 300-movement sequence in only 150 movements, most commonly divided by teachers today into 85, 88, 103, or 108 "postures" or stopping points.

The Cheng Man-ch'ing and Chinese Sports Commission short forms are said to be derived from Yang family forms, but neither is recognized as Yang family tai chi by current standard-bearing Yang family teachers. The Chen, Yang and Wu families are now promoting their own shortened demonstration forms for competitive purposes.

As the 21st century began, the Chinese government also commissioned short 10 Forms and 16 Forms from each of the five major tai chi lineages. (The 10 forms are also known as 8 forms.) After these forms had been taught for several years, they were all presented as a set to attendees of the First International Tai Chi Chuan Symposium in Nashville, TN in July 2009.

Yang Chengfu; 1883–1936; 3rd gen. Yang; Yang Big Frame
Cheng Man-ch'ing; 1902–1975; 4th gen. Yang; Short (37) Form	Chinese Sports Commission; 1956; Beijing (24) Form
1989; 42 Competition Form (Wushu competition form combined from Chen, Yang, Wu & Sun styles)

== Weapon forms ==
While Yang Chengfu removed explosive power release (fa jin), leaps, and stamping from the large-frame solo hand form to make it accessible for general health practice, traditional Yang-style weapons curricula retained vigorous fa jin alongside continuous, even-tempo body mechanics. Classical Yang weapon training centers on three primary instruments: the double-edged straight sword (taijijian, 太極劍), the single-edged broadsword or sabre (taijidao, 太極刀; see dao), and the long pole or spear (taijiqiang, 太極槍; see qiang and gun). Traditional schools transmit a classical Yang family taijijian solo routine (commonly divided into 54 or 67 movements depending on lineage), as well as a 13-sabre routine and long-pole da gan (大桿) drills. In 1957, martial artist Li Tianji and the Chinese Sports Commission adapted core postures primarily from traditional Yang-style swordsmanship to create the standardized 32-posture taijijian form, which became the most widely practiced introductory tai chi sword routine internationally.

Yang-style taijijian organizes blade work around thirteen classical techniques, including pointing (diǎn), upward slicing (liāo), thrusting (cì), parrying (gé), intercepting (jié), and sweeping (xǐ), guided by a relaxed, supple wrist (鬆腕; sōng wàn) and pliable grip rather than stiff-armed force. Unlike modern sport wushu competition foils stamped from thin spring steel to flex and snap audibly during acrobatics, traditional Yang-style practice employs an unsharpened, semi-flexible steel jian (historically forged in sword-making centers such as Longquan) with a raised central ridge (劍脊; jiànjí) and gradual distal taper so the lower two-thirds remain rigid for deflections while the front third flexes cleanly without tip chatter. Sized to practitioner stature across 71–82 cm (28–32 in) blade lengths, solo practice jian typically weigh 590–630 g (1.30–1.39 lb) un-scabbarded with a point of balance 6.0–9.0 cm (2.4–3.5 in) ahead of the guard, housed in a solid hardwood scabbard (such as jichi wood) to maintain consistent single-hand balance and cultivate tactile sensitivity (聽勁; tīngjìn).

== Some notable descendants of Yang Luchan ==
=== Yang Shouzhong ===
Yang Shouzhong is from the fourth generation of the Yang family. He was the oldest son of Yang Chengfu by his first marriage, and started learning his family-style when he was eight years old under the strict supervision of his father. In 1949, he moved to Hong Kong. There he taught many students privately at his home until his death in 1985. He had three daughters—Tai Yee, Ma Lee, and Yee Li—and all continue to teach in Hong Kong. Over the years he had taught many people, but he accepted only three people as his disciples. These Yang family tai chi practitioners are:

- Master Ip Tai Tak (Yip Tai Tak, 1929–2004) in Hong Kong.
- Master Chu Gin Soon, in Boston.
- Master Chu King Hung (朱景雄, pinyin: zhū jǐng xióng, born 1945) in the United Kingdom. Master Chu is head of the International Tai Chi Chuan Association (ITCCA).

=== Yang Zhenduo ===
Grandmaster Yang Zhenduo (1926 – 2020) is from the fourth generation of the Yang family and is officially the Fourth Lineage Holder of the Traditional Yang-style tai chi. He was born in Beijing in 1926 and is the third son of Yang Chengfu. He started studying with his father when very young and continued studying with his older brothers and Zhao Bin after his father died. In 1960, Yang Zhenduo moved to Taiyuan, Shanxi Province. Since then, Yang-style tai chi has gradually spread within Taiyuan and to other cities, provinces, and countries.

Since 1980, he has served as vice-president of the Shanxi Wushu Association. In 1982 Yang Zhenduo founded the Shanxi Yang Style Tai Chi Chuan Association, and has served as president since. The association has now grown to over 30,000 members throughout the Province and is the largest martial arts organization of its kind in China. In October 1998, Yang Zhenduo founded the International Yang Style Tai Chi Chuan Association, serving as chairman of the board. Under his leadership, the International Association has grown to 28 centers in 12 countries with over 2,000 members. The Chinese Wushu Academy recognized Master Yang Zhenduo in 1996 as one of the top 100 Wushu Masters in China. He has also been honored by proclamations from the mayors of San Antonio, Texas and Troy, Michigan.

In July 2009, at the First International Tai Chi Chuan Symposium, held at Vanderbilt University, in Nashville, TN, Grandmaster Yang Zhenduo officially named his grandson Yang Jun as the Fifth Lineage Holder of traditional Yang-style tai chi. Zhao YouBin is also direct 5 generation family member of Yang Family and the senior lineage holder in the family. Zhao Bin (1906 – 1999) his father was the teacher of Yang Zhenduo and was the oldest of the 4th generation Yang children his grand father was Yang Chengfu's older brother Yang Zhaoyuan. Yang Zhenduo's second wife's children were adopted by the later, therefore not direct blood lineage. Fu Zhongwen (1903–1994) was married to Zhao Bins sister therefore his brother in law also 4th generation family inheritor. His son Fu Sheng Yuan (1931 – 2017) 5th generation lineage holder has one son James Fu. Zhao YouBin has one son Zhao Liang and a grandson all actively practicing Yang Family Taiji in China.

== See also ==
- 103-form Yang family tai chi
- 24-(Simplified Form) tai chi
- 42-(Competition Form) tai chi
- Yangjia Michuan tai chi
