= List of tai chi forms =

List of tai chi forms, postures, movements, or positions in order of number of forms, sometimes also called Taolu:

== Hand forms ==
- 4 - Chen 4 Step is a subset of Chen Old Frame One (Zhu Tian Cai)
- 4 - Chen 4 Step is a subset of Chen Beijing Branch (Wang Xiaojun)
- 4 - Yang 4 Step (Lohan)
- 5 - Yang 5 Step (Wang Xiaojun)
- 8 - Yang Standardized
- 8 - Chen Standardized
- 9 - Chen Old Frame (Master Liu Yong)
- 10 - Yang Introductory Form (also often called 8-step)
- 11 - Chen created by Liming Yue after many years of study with Chen Zhenglei and Kongjie Gou
- 12 - Chen(Based on the movements from Feng Zhiqiang's Chen Style Xinyi Hunyuan Taijiquan system. Taught by the SF Wushu Team)
- 12 - Yang
- 13 - Chen (created by Master Chen Bing based on the movements from (Old Frame, First Routine, Lao Jia Yi Lu))
- 13 - Chen (aka Five Element Chen) subset of either Old Frame One or Small Frame (Zhu Tian Cai)
- 13 - Dong Yue (East Mountain) Combined
- 13 - Wudang (Zhang SanFeng - Wudang Nei Jia Quan) - Shi San Shi
- 13 - Yang Family 13-Form
- 13 - Chu style Yang form Long 108 and Short 37 movements
- 14/16 - Guangbo (Guang-Bo) (a mixture of Chen, Yang, Wu, and Qigong that was done by factory workers in China)
- 16 - Yang Standardized
- 16 - Chen Standardized
- 16 - Actually Chen 4 Step (see above) popularly repeated in four directions of the compass (Zhu Tian Cai)
- 16 - Yang Family 16-Form
- 18 - Chen (Chen Zhenglei)
- 18 - Wudang (Zhang SanFeng - simplified new form)
- 19 - Chen (Chen Xiao Wang)
- 20 - 5 Section Taijiquan (Yang Simplified)
- 20 - 5 Section Chen Taijiquan (Chen Simplified)
- 20 - Simplified form of Chen Xiaojia (Small frame of Chen tai chi)
- 24 - Yang ('Simplified', 'Beijing', 'New Style') Standardized
- 24 - Chen Shi (Chen style) Xinyi Hunyuan Taijiquan (24 Form by Feng Zhiqiang)
- 24 - Zhao Bao
- 24 - Jingquanshitaijiquan (24 Forms - T'ien Ti Tao/Tiandidao)
- 26 - Yang
- 28 - Yang
- 28 - Wudang Taiji
- 32 - Combined Form
- 32 - Chen Standardized "Fist" (New Frame)
- 32 - Yang
- 34 - Wudang short
- 35 - Sun Standardized Short
- 36 - Chen Standardized, Beijing Branch (Tian Xiuchen and Kan Guixiang)
- 36 - Fu style short form tai chi ch'uan
- 36 - Wu Short Form
- 37 - Wu (Wang Pei-sheng) Short
- 37 - Yang (Zheng, Cheng Man-ch'ing) Short
- 37 - Taiji 37 (Dr. Shen Hongxun) Short
- 38 - Chen (Chen Xiao Wang)
- 39 - Chen (Old frame 39)
- 39 - Chen (New frame 39)
- 40 - Yang competition
- 40 - Sun Family Modern Short Form
- 40 - Jingquanshitaijiquan (40 Steps or 24 Forms - T'ien Ti Tao/Tiandidao)
- 41 - Sun 41: Tai Chi for Arthritis (TCA), created by Dr. Paul Lam of the Tai Chi for Health Institute, Sydney, Australia. Sun 20: Basic 6 moves, performed on Right and Left. Sun 41: additional 6 moves, also performed both sides.
- 42 - Yang
- 42 - Chen (Old form cannon fist)
- 42 - Combined Style Competition Form
- 42 - Sun Traditional Short
- 43 - Yang (Jiang Yu Kun)
- 43 - Zhao Bao
- 46 - Yang Competition
- 46 - Wu competition
- 48 - Old Combined Style Competition Form
- 48 - Chen Shi (Chen style) Xinyi Hunyuan Taijiquan (48 Form by Feng Zhiqiang)
- 49 - Yang Family Demonstration and Competition Form ("Short" Form)
- 49 - Wu (Hao) short form
- 50 - Lee-style short form
- 53 - Fu style advanced tai chi
- 54 - Wu Jianquan family (Wu Daxin) competition form
- 56 - Chen Competition
- 56 - Zhao Bao
- 64 - Yang (Kuang Ping style)
- 64 - Chen-style tai chi Practical Method Erlu
- 66 - Combined Standardized
- 67 - Movements Combined tai chi form - see 66
- 67 - Fu style tai chi lightning palm
- 67 - Hwa Yu tai chi Long Form
- 71 - Chen Erlu (Cannon Fist), Beijing Branch (Chen Fake)
- 72 - Huang Sheng Shyan Form
- 72 - Wu Chao Xiang: "traditional form of the master Wu Chao Xiang";
- 73 - Sun Competition
- 74 - Chen-style Laojia forms
- 77 - Yang Extended Renovation
- 81 - Wu (Hao) Old Form
- 81 - Chen Style tai chi Practical Method Yilu
- 81 - WoLong, Divine Fractal Form
- 83 - Chen Yilu, Beijing Branch (Chen Fake)
- 83 - Beijing Northern Wu Style tai chi
- 88 - Yang Standardized (which appears to differ slightly from traditional forms of similar length)
- 95 - Shanghai Jianchuan T'ai Chi Association Wu Style tai chi fast form
- 96 - Wu (Hao) long form
- 96 - Ma Yongsheng "New Tai Chi" 96-steps as taught in Nanjing Central Kuoshu Academy. Currently it is also known as Ma-family tai chi and as it covers the 8 directions, some called it Bagua tai chi.
- 97/98 - Sun Traditional Long
- 99 - Orthodox Cheng Ming System which was devised as a combination of the 5 Main styles in Nanjing in 1929 and was taught by the Master Wang Shujin
- 103 - Yang long form (The moves can also add up to 85, 88, 108 or 150 depending on how they are counted.)
- 105 - Fu style tai chi
- 108 - Taoist Tai Chi form, As done by Taoist Tai Chi Society
- 108 - Chen
- 108 - Wu Jianquan long form
- 119 - Wudang long
- 120 - Tchoung_Ta-chen - Annotated Form
- 127 - Yangjia Michuan tai chi - Yang Family Hidden Tradition
- 140 - Lee-style form
- 144 - Chen Style tai chi Practical Method Combined Yilu-Erlu
- 180 - Wu Long Form
- 185 - Lee-style tai chi dance (Tiàowǔ 跳舞)
- 229 - Tchoung_Ta-chen - Long Form

== Weapon forms ==
- 13 - Dong Yue (East Mountain) Combined Jian (sword)
- 13 - Wu Jianquan Spear
- 13 - Beijing Northern Wu-style Tai Chi thirteen Dao (saber)
- 13 - Posture Poem Yang-style Tai Chi Dao Form
- 13 - Yang-style Dao
- 14 - Chen Tai Chi Dadao (machete), Chen Beijing Branch
- 16 - Yang Standardized Sword
- 16 - Yang/Combined Standardized Spear
- 18 - Chen 'Health' Standardized Jian
- 20 - Chen sword Xiaojia
- 23 - Chen long stick (gun), Chen Beijing Branch
- 23 - Chen Broadsword
- 24 - Wu Jianquan Spear
- 27 - 5 Section solo Tai Chi
- 30 - Chen Tai Chi Dadao
- 32 - Yang/Combined Jian
- 32 - Divine Staff of Tiandidao.
- 36 - Chen Jian, Beijing Branch (Tian Xiuchen)
- 36 - Chen Broadsword, Beijing Branch (Tian Xiuchen)
- 36 - Chen-style Xinyi Hun Yuan broadsword
- 36 - Yang-style Tai Chi Fan
- 40 - Chen Broadsword
- 42 - Tai Chi Dao of Tiandidao.
- 42 - Competition Sword Tai Chi Jian (complements 42 tai chi competition forms)
- 46 - Chen Broadsword, Beijing Branch (Tian Qiutian)
- 48 - Chen Hand Fan (Ma Chunxi)
- 48 - Chen-style Xinyi Hun Yuan sword
- 49 - Chen Sword
- 54 - Yang Sword
- 56 - Fu-style tai chi seven star sword
- 58 - Chen Sword, Beijing Branch (Chen Fake)
- 60 - Wu-style tai chi Jian (Created by Master Chian Ho Yin)
- 62 - Chen Single Sword
- 64 - 5 Section 2 person tai chi
- 67 - Movement Yang-style tai chi Sword Form
- 84 - Wu Style Heaven and Earth Sword Form (Qian Kun Jian)
- 92 - Wudang Single Sword
- 108 - Wu Jianquan Dao
- 108 - Wu Jianquan Jian
- 216 - Lee style Tai Chi sword
- 270 - Lee style Tai Chi Stick (Staff)

== See also ==
- Chen-style
- Yang-style
- Wu-style of Wu Quanyou and Wu Jianquan
- Wu or Wu/Hao-style of Wu Yuxiang
- Sun-style
- Yangjia Michuan-style
- Lee-style
- Pushing hands
