= Chen Xiaowang =

Chinese tai chi teacher

Chen Xiaowang 陳小旺
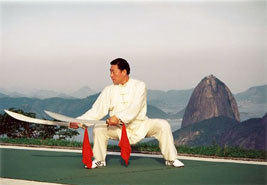
- Born: October 20, 1945 (age 79); Chenjiagou, Henan, China
- Style: Chen-style tai chi (11th gen. Chen)

Chen Xiaowang
- Chinese: 陳小旺
Transcriptions
Standard Mandarin
- Hanyu Pinyin: Chén Xiǎowàng

Chen Xiaowang (born 20 October 1945) is an Australian-Chinese tai chi teacher, who was born and raised in Chen Family Village (Chenjiagou, 陳家溝), Wen County, Henan province, and is the 19th generation lineage holder of Chen-style tai chi. His grandfather was the Chinese martial artist and tai chi grandmaster Chen Fake.

== Biography ==
Chen Xiaowang began his study of Chen-style tai chi at the age of seven under his father, Chen Zhaoxu, and later with his uncles Chen Zhaopi and Chen Zhaokui. Recognised as one of four "Buddha's Warrior Attendants (Si Jingang)," the four outstanding exponents of the 19th generation in Chenjiagou, Xiaowang was chairperson of the Henan Province Chen Push Hands Taijiquan Association, deputy head of the Wushu Academy of Henan Province, and technical advisor and official assessor for the standardized competition routines for the Chen, Yang, Wu, and Sun styles of tai chi.

Chen was awarded the Chinese National Wushu Tournament Taijiquan gold medal three consecutive years beginning in 1980. He was depicted in a March 1981 Japanese documentary on tai chi, demonstrating the laojia form, fa jin, and escaping from various qinna holds. In 1985, he was crowned Taijiquan Champion at the First International Wushu Competition in Xi'an.

Chen created two condensed forms of the laojia and xinjia forms; a 38-posture form and a 19-posture form (Shi Jiu Shi – 十九式). He told inside Kung-Fu Magazine in 1991, "I have tried to do away with all the repetitions and simplify the exceedingly difficult moves without destroying the characteristics of Chen Style [tai chi], with special emphasis to attack/defense and the chansi technique."

Ellis Amdur narrated an anecdote where he attended to a training workshop, in which Xiaowang demonstrated a move named "Budda's Warrior Attendant Pounds Mortar," an elevated foot stomp. Despite being on a stage six feet over the gymnasium floor, Xiaowang stomped so powerfully that "the floor shook... forty feet away." Amdur checked out whether it had been caused by a tricked floor, but he could not find anything, nor could he replicate the effect by jumping stiff-legged from the stage.

Apart from his martial arts prowess, Chen is a carpenter by trade, a calligrapher, an author of three tai chi books, and is known to enjoy Mao Jian Cha tea (信阳毛尖茶).
