= Cheng Tin Hung =

Chinese tai chi master

Cheng Tin Hung 鄭天熊
- Born: 1930; Hong Kong, China
- Died: 7 May 2005 (aged 74–75)
- Nationality: Chinese
- Style: Founder of Wudang taijiquan

Other information
- Notable students: Cheng Kam Yan (鄭鑑恩)

Cheng Tin Hung
- Chinese: 鄭天熊
Transcriptions
Standard Mandarin
- Hanyu Pinyin: Zhèng Tiānxióng

Cheng Tin Hung or Zheng Tianxiong (1930–2005) was an influential tai chi master and the founder of "Wudang tai chi". He was based in Hong Kong, China, and sometimes attracted controversy for his attitude and approach to the teaching and practice of his martial art. Also known as the "Tai Chi Bodyguard" for his enthusiastic defence of tai chi as a martial art, he took part in full contact competitions as a young man and also trained some of his students to do the same during the 1960s, '70s and '80s.

Though closely associated with the Wu school of tai chi, he founded a separate organisation called the Hong Kong Tai Chi Association (香港太極總會) which is now run by his wife Chan Lai Ping (陳麗平).

Cheng Tin Hung produced a series of books and VCDs on the subject of tai chi and was also involved in the production of the 1974 Hong Kong movie called The Shadow Boxer (Shaw Brothers). He appears in the opening scenes and some of his techniques were also used in the fight scenes of the movie proper.

During the 1980s, Cheng Tin Hung travelled to the UK to promote tai chi. In collaboration with three of his students, Ian Cameron, Tong Chi Kin and Dan Docherty, he produced a joint publication called Wutan Tai Chi Chuan.

During the 1990s, Cheng Tin Hung's tai chi career slowly drew to a close with the onset of diabetes and its debilitating effects. Chen died in 2005.

== Some career highlights of note ==
- 1950: Established the Cheng Tin Hung Tai Chi Academy in Hong Kong
- 1957: Won the Hong Kong Macau Taiwan boxing competition held in Taiwan
- 1972: Established the Hong Kong Tai Chi Association
- 1975: In conjunction with the Hong Kong government, established Taijiquan classes throughout Hong Kong
- 1980s: started construction of Tai Chi Heights, part retirement home and part Taijiquan resource centre in his hometown in Guangdong, China.

== Tai chi lineage tree with Wu-style focus ==
Note:

- This lineage tree is not comprehensive, but depicts those considered the 'gate-keepers' & most recognized individuals in each generation of Wu-style.
- Although many styles were passed down to respective descendants of the same family, the lineage focused on is that of the Wu style & not necessarily that of the family.

Key:	NEIJIA
Solid lines	Direct teacher-student.
Dot lines	Partial influence /taught informally /limited time.	TAI CHI
Dash lines	Individual(s) omitted.
Dash cross	Branch continues.	CHEN-STYLE	Zhaobao-style
YANG-STYLE
(王蘭亭); Wang Lanting; 1840–? 2nd gen. Yang	Yang Jianhou; 1839–1917; 2nd gen. Yang; 2nd gen. Yangjia Michuan	Yang Banhou; 1837–1892; 2nd gen. Yang; 2nd gen. Guang Ping Yang; Yang Small Frame	WU (HAO)-STYLE	Zhaobao He-style
Li-style	Yang Shao-hou; 1862–1930; 3rd gen. Yang; Yang Small Frame	Wu Quanyou; 1834–1902; 1st gen. Wu
(齊閣臣); Qi Gechen; 2nd gen. Wu	(夏公甫); Xia Gongfu; 2nd gen. Wu	Wu Jianquan; 1870–1942; 2nd gen. Wu; WU-STYLE; 108 Form	(常遠亭); Chang Yuanting; 1860–1918; 2nd gen. Wu	(郭松亭); Guo Songting; 2nd gen. Wu	Wang Maozhai; 1862–1940; 2nd gen. Wu	SUN-STYLE
Dong Yingjie; 1891–1960; 4th gen. Yang	(齊敏軒); Qi Minxuan; 3rd gen. Wu	Cheng Wing Kwong; 1903–1967; 3rd gen. Wu	Wu Yinghua; 1907–1997; 3rd gen. Wu	Wu Gongyi; 1900–1970; 3rd gen. Wu	Wu Kung-tsao; 1903–1983; 3rd gen. Wu	Ma Yueliang; 1901–1998; 3rd gen. Wu	Yang Yuting; 1887–1982; 3rd gen. Wu
(鄭天熊); Cheng Tin Hung; 1930–2005; Wudang-style	Wu Ta-k'uei; 1923–1972; 4th gen. Wu	Wu Yanxia; 1930–2001; 4th gen. Wu	Wu Daxin; 1933–2005; 4th gen. Wu	(立群); Li Liqun; 1924–2013; 4th gen. Wu	Wang Peisheng; 1919–2004; 4th gen. Wu
Wu Kuang-yu; 1946–Present; 5th gen. Wu	(骆舒焕); Luo Shuhuan; 1935–1987; 5th gen. Wu
CHEN-STYLE	YANG-STYLE	WU-STYLE	SUN-STYLE	WU (HAO)-STYLE
