= Ma Jiangbao =

Chinese martial artist (1941–2016)

马江豹 Ma Jiangbao
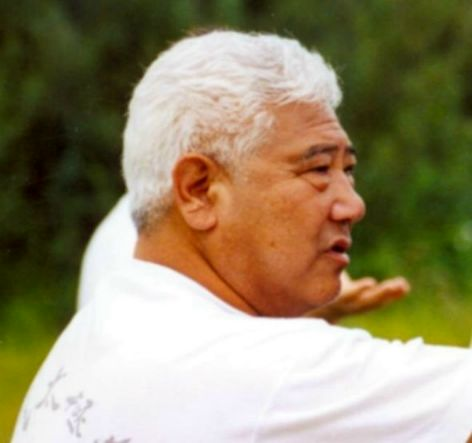
- Born: 31 October 1941; Shanghai, China
- Died: 12 October 2016 (aged 74); Rotterdam Netherlands
- Style: Wu-style tai chi

Ma Jiangbao
- Chinese: 马江豹
Transcriptions
Standard Mandarin
- Hanyu Pinyin: Mǎ Jiāngbào

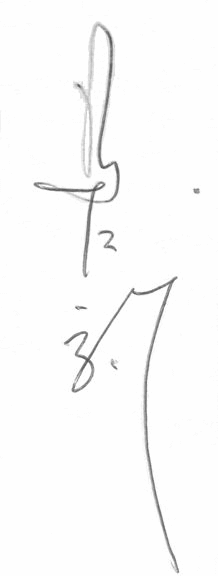
Ma Jiang Bao's autograph

Ma Jiangbao (31 October 1941 – 12 October 2016) was a well known teacher of Wu-style tai chi. He was the third son of Wu Yinghua and Ma Yueliang.

== Biography ==
In 1986 he came with his father Ma Yueliang to Europe to teach Wu-style. Ma Yueliang returned home after four months, while Ma Jiangbao took up residence in Rotterdam. He taught, and his students still teach, in many countries in Europe as well as in South Africa and Japan.

Wu-style was created by a Manchu named Wu Quanyou (1834–1902). Wu was a student of Yang Luchan, (founder of the Yang style), and Yang Banhou. Wu Quanyou's son, Wu Jianquan (1870-1942), loved martial arts from his youth and studied under the tutorship of his father. After 1912 he continuously developed the teaching of tai chi at the Beijing Sport Research Society, gradually refining his father’s style. His two sons, Wu Gongyi and Wu Kung-tsao, were his first students.

Ma Jiangbao's mother, Wu Yinghua, was Wu Jianquan's eldest daughter. She started studying tai chi with her father at a very young age. In 1935 Wu Yinghua was appointed deputy director of the Jianquan Association in Shanghai. She married her father’s student, Ma Yueliang (1901–1998), and throughout her life she taught with her husband all over China. In martial arts circles she was regarded as one of the most renowned teachers. Ma Hailong, the eldest son of Wu Yinghua and Ma Yueliang, also studied tai chi from a young age and is now the president of the Jianquan Association Shanghai.

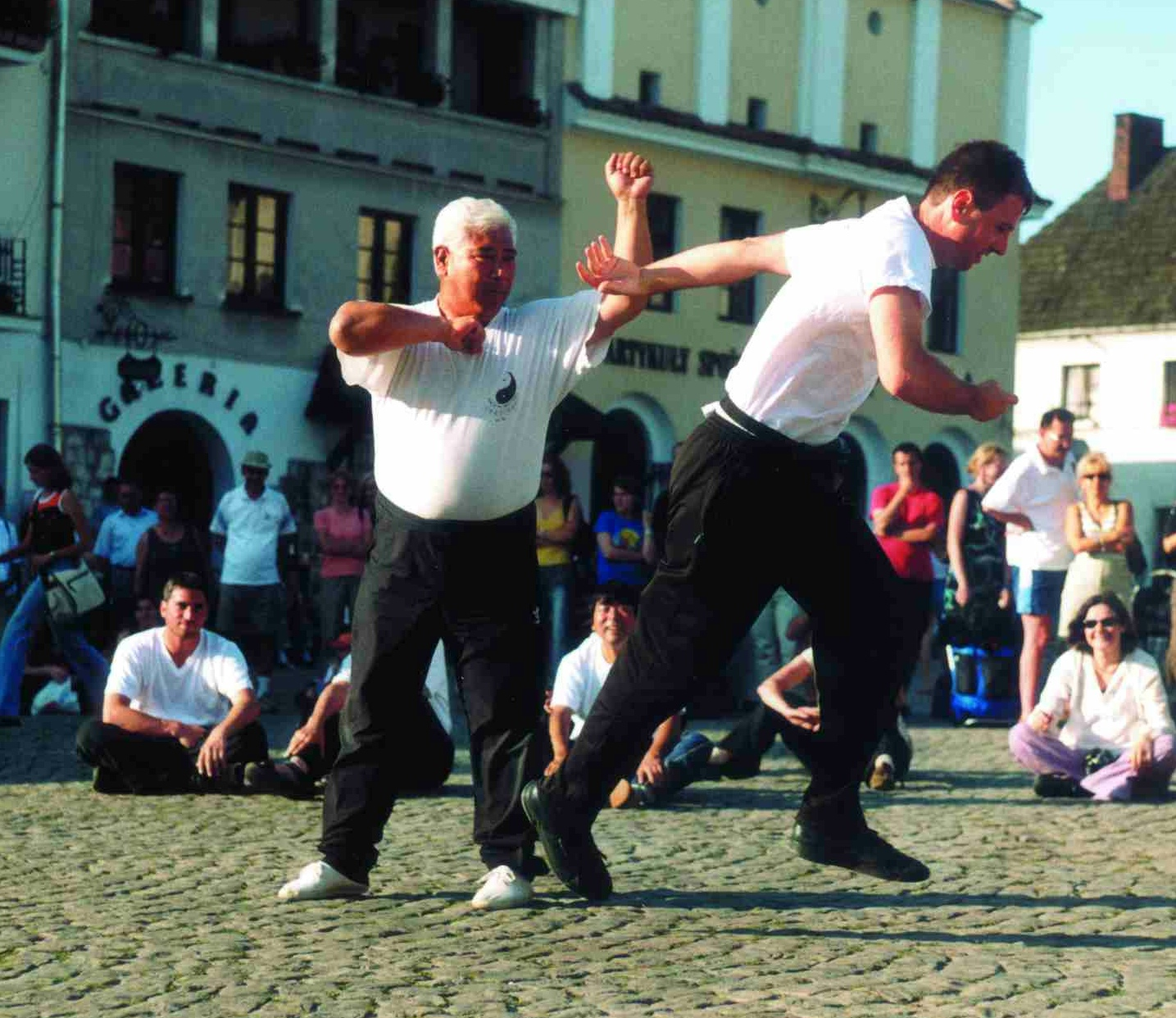
Ma demonstrating Pushing hands
