= Wu-style tai chi =

Chinese martial art

Wu-style tai chi 吳氏太極拳
- Also known as: Ng-style tai chi
- Date founded: late 19th century
- Country of origin: China
- Founder: Wu Jianquan
- Current head: Wu Kuang-yu; 5th gen. Wu
- Arts taught: Tai chi
- Ancestor arts: Yang-style tai chi
- Practitioners: Wu Quanyou, Wu Gongyi, Ma Yueliang, Wu Yanxia
- Official website: WuStyle.com

Wu-style tai chi (Chinese: 吳氏太极拳; pinyin: Wúshì tàijíquán) is one of the five main styles of tai chi. It is second in popularity after Yang-style, and the fourth-oldest of the five major tai chi styles. It was developed by Wu Quanyou and Wu Jianquan.

== History ==
Wu Quanyou was a military officer cadet of Manchu ancestry in the Yellow Banner camp (see Qing Dynasty Military) in the Forbidden City, Beijing and also a hereditary officer of the Imperial Guards Brigade. At that time, Yang Luchan was the martial arts instructor in the Imperial Guards, teaching tai chi, and in 1850 Wu Quanyou became one of his students.

In 1870, Wu Jianquan was asked to become the senior disciple of Yang Banhou, Yang Luchan's oldest adult son, and an instructor as well to the Manchu military. Wu Quanyou had three primary disciples: his son Wu Jianquan, Wang Maozhai and Guo Fen.

Wu Quanyou's son, Wu Jianquan, grandsons Wu Gongyi and Wu Kung-tsao, and granddaughter Wu Yinghua were well-known teachers.

Wu Jianquan became the most widely known teacher in his family, and is therefore considered the co-founder of the Wu style by his family and their students. He taught large numbers of people and his refinements to the art more clearly distinguish Wu style from Yang style training.

Wu Jianquan moved his family south from Beijing (where an important school founded by other students of his father is headquartered, popularly known as the Northern Wu style) to Shanghai in 1928, where he founded the Jianquan Taijiquan Association (鑑泉太極拳社) in 1935.

Wu Gongyi then moved the family headquarters to Hong Kong in 1948, while His younger sister Wu Yinghua and her husband Ma Yueliang stayed behind to manage the original Shanghai school.

Between 1983 and her death in 1996 Wu Yinghua was the highest-ranked instructor in the Wu family system. Her descendants continue teaching and today manage the Shanghai school as well as schools in Europe:

- Ma Hailong (1935–2022) led the Shanghai Jianquan Taijiquan Association until his death.
- Ma Jiangbao (1941-2016) lived in the Netherlands and taught traditional tai chi throughout Europe.
- Her granddaughter Dr. Jin Ye lives and teaches in Huddersfield, England.
- Her adopted daughter Shi Meilin now lives and teaches Wu-style tai chi in New Zealand, with students also in France and The United States.

Wu Gongyi's children were also full-time martial art teachers:

- His son Wu Ta-k'uei was active in the resistance to the Japanese invasion of China, yet he later taught tai chi in Japan after the war.
- His younger brother, Wu Daqi, supervised the family's Hong Kong and southeast Asian schools for many years and opened the family's first Western Hemisphere school in Toronto, Canada in 1974.
- His daughter, Wu Yanxia, was known as an expert with the tai chi jian (sword).
- His cousin, Wu Daxin, was also known as a weapons specialist, particularly with the tai chi Dao.

=== Tai chi lineage tree with Wu-style focus ===
Note:

- This lineage tree is not comprehensive, but depicts those considered the 'gate-keepers' & most recognized individuals in each generation of Wu-style.
- Although many styles were passed down to respective descendants of the same family, the lineage focused on is that of the Wu style & not necessarily that of the family.

Key:	NEIJIA
Solid lines	Direct teacher-student.
Dot lines	Partial influence /taught informally /limited time.	TAI CHI
Dash lines	Individual(s) omitted.
Dash cross	Branch continues.	CHEN-STYLE	Zhaobao-style
YANG-STYLE
(王蘭亭); Wang Lanting; 1840–? 2nd gen. Yang	Yang Jianhou; 1839–1917; 2nd gen. Yang; 2nd gen. Yangjia Michuan	Yang Banhou; 1837–1892; 2nd gen. Yang; 2nd gen. Guang Ping Yang; Yang Small Frame	WU (HAO)-STYLE	Zhaobao He-style
Li-style	Yang Shao-hou; 1862–1930; 3rd gen. Yang; Yang Small Frame	Wu Quanyou; 1834–1902; 1st gen. Wu
(齊閣臣); Qi Gechen; 2nd gen. Wu	(夏公甫); Xia Gongfu; 2nd gen. Wu	Wu Jianquan; 1870–1942; 2nd gen. Wu; WU-STYLE; 108 Form	(常遠亭); Chang Yuanting; 1860–1918; 2nd gen. Wu	(郭松亭); Guo Songting; 2nd gen. Wu	Wang Maozhai; 1862–1940; 2nd gen. Wu	SUN-STYLE
Dong Yingjie; 1891–1960; 4th gen. Yang	(齊敏軒); Qi Minxuan; 3rd gen. Wu	Cheng Wing Kwong; 1903–1967; 3rd gen. Wu	Wu Yinghua; 1907–1997; 3rd gen. Wu	Wu Gongyi; 1900–1970; 3rd gen. Wu	Wu Kung-tsao; 1903–1983; 3rd gen. Wu	Ma Yueliang; 1901–1998; 3rd gen. Wu	Yang Yuting; 1887–1982; 3rd gen. Wu
(鄭天熊); Cheng Tin Hung; 1930–2005; Wudang-style	Wu Ta-k'uei; 1923–1972; 4th gen. Wu	Wu Yanxia; 1930–2001; 4th gen. Wu	Wu Daxin; 1933–2005; 4th gen. Wu	(立群); Li Liqun; 1924–2013; 4th gen. Wu	Wang Peisheng; 1919–2004; 4th gen. Wu
Wu Kuang-yu; 1946–Present; 5th gen. Wu	(骆舒焕); Luo Shuhuan; 1935–1987; 5th gen. Wu
CHEN-STYLE	YANG-STYLE	WU-STYLE	SUN-STYLE	WU (HAO)-STYLE

== Training ==
The Wu style's distinctive hand form, pushing hands and weapons trainings emphasize parallel footwork and horse stance training with the feet relatively closer together than the modern Yang or Chen styles, small circle hand techniques (although large circle techniques are trained as well) and differs from the other tai chi family styles martially with Wu style's initial focus on grappling, throws (Shuai jiao), tumbling, jumping, footsweeps, pressure point leverage and joint locks and breaks, which are trained in addition to more conventional tai chi sparring and fencing at advanced levels.

== Generational senior instructors of the Wu family tai chi schools ==
1st Generation

- Wu Quanyou (吳全佑, 1834-1902), who learned from Yang Luchan and Yang Banhou, was senior instructor of the family from 1870–1902.

2nd generation

- His oldest son, Wu Jianquan (1870-1942), was senior from 1902–1942.

3rd Generation

- His oldest son, Wu Gongyi (1900-1970), was senior from 1942–1970.
- Wu Gongyi's younger brother, Wu Gongzao (1903-1983), was senior from 1970–1983.
- Wu Gongyi's younger sister, Wu Yinghua ({1907-1997), was senior from 1983–1997.

4th Generation

- Wu Gongyi's daughter, Wu Yanxia (1930-2001) was senior from 1997–2001.
- Wu Gongzao's son, Wu Daxin (1933-2005), was senior from 2001–2005.

5th Generation

- The current senior instructor of the Wu family is Wu Ta-k'uei's son Wu Kuang-yu (born 1946).

== See also ==
- 108-form Wu family tai chi
- Wu-style tai chi fast form
- List of tai chi forms
- Silk reeling
- Wudang tai chi
