= Fa jin =

Term used in Chinese martial arts

Fa jin, fajin or fa chin (Chinese: 發勁; pinyin: fājìn), is a term used in some Chinese martial arts, particularly the neijia (internal) martial arts, such as tai chi, xingyiquan, baguazhang, liuhebafa, ziranmen, bak mei, and bajiquan.

It means to issue or discharge power explosively or refining the explosive power, and is not specific to any particular striking method. With this definition in mind, a boxer is also capable of fa jin. However, in the context of internal martial arts, the term usually refers to a set of methods to generate and focus force, resulting in physical feats with far less visual physical expression such as the one-inch punch.

Jin (勁; jìn; 'power') is often confused by Westerners with the related concept of jing (精; jīng; 'essence'), possibly because when jin is an adjective it is also spelled jing (jìng, 'strong') but with a different pinyin tone mark. Jin describes the ability to generate force. Jin and qi are intrinsically linked concepts in internal martial arts. To generate the fa jin, according to the traditional explanation, it is necessary to transfer qi from dantian towards the limb or body part (e.g. shoulder, head, hip) that will perform the technique with explosive force (bàofālì, 爆發力). If a person is off balance and stiff, they have no jin, as qi cannot penetrate the muscle to produce force.

In terms of biomechanics, fa jin is a matter of utilizing body alignment and coordination to form an extremely efficient kinematic chain. The body begins in a relaxed physical state, which is then quickly accelerated in a coordinated whole-body movement.

== Tai chi ==
In the practice of tai chi it is a description of a technique, generally indicating a sudden release of energy obtained by the coordinated movement of the entire body. Every technique can express fa jin, not just kicks, punches, elbows and knees, but also holds, levers and projections. The mastery of the techniques of silk reeling is essential. The fa jin released during exhalation is almost unconscious. This technique is referred to in the forms of training school as the Lao Jia Chen Paochui (old frame, cannon fist, one of the two original forms Chen-style tai chi), while in Yang school, especially for those who have a direct lineage to Yang Shaohou the fa jin is added to techniques to release the stored energy.

== Dantian ==
A main principle in creating fa jin is using dantian (lower abdomen). The dantian is thought to be the storehouse of energy and can be used in striking. One technique described by Wang Jianqiao for developing fa jin is by breathing into the dantian and creating a pressure. When striking and squeezing the lower abdomen tight so that the core becomes compact, unifying the torso, this actively engages more of the muscle fibers to generate more force.

== See also ==
- Neijin
- Neigong
- One-inch punch
- Pushing hands
- Traditional Chinese medicine
- Fight-or-flight response
