= Cheng Wing Kwong =

Cheng Wing Kwong (Zheng Rongguang) (Chin: 鄭榮光, 1903–1967) was a disciple (Tudi) of Wu Jianquan, the founder of Wu Style Taijiquan. He was born in Niao Shi, Zhongshan, Guangdong, China.

== Early life ==
Cheng immigrated to Hong Kong at the age of 13. After graduating, he became a businessman. His nickname was Cheng Chek Wan. As a young man, he joined the Hong Kong Ching Wu Martial Arts Club and learned Taijiquan from Master Chiu Sau Chien (趙壽村1901-1964), who was a nephew of Wu Jianquan (吳鑑泉1870 – 1942).

== Career ==
In 1937, Wu Jianquan came to Hong Kong to teach Wu Style Taiji at the South China Sports Association. Soon after Wu came to Hong Kong, Cheng was accepted as one of his Inside-Disciples and later became Vice President of Wu Jianquan Taiji Academy Hong Kong. Due to his abilities in Pushing Hands and demonstrations of his Neigong (he used to invite well known boxers to punch him just to show he received the punches unimpressed and relaxed) he became famous in Guangzhou, Singapore and Malaysia, where he established schools with Wu Jianquan's son, Wu Gongyi (吴公儀, 1900–1970). He was called “Fragrant Harbour Master” or “Master from Hong Kong”. He died in 1967.

== Teaching and influence ==
From 1948 to 1952, Cheng taught Wu’s Taiji at the South China Sports Association in Hong Kong. In 1952, Master Cheng Wing Kwong established the Wing Kwong Taiji Academy in Causeway Bay, Hong Kong, to promote Wu Style Taijiquan.

In 1962, he was invited by the Ching Wu Martial Arts Club in Malaysia to teach Wu's Taiji at the Club. For around five years, he trained many Taiji lovers from both Malaysia and Singapore; many of them later became well-known Taiji masters.

Cheng had learned Xingyiquan and Baguazhang from Sun Lutang or one of his students before studying Taijiquan and had added several of Sun's methods to the training. Some martial artists in Cheng's lineage, especially those who learned from his disciple Woo Hsing teach this.

Cheng had learned Qigong/Neigong in several lineages of Alchemy before meeting Wu and had written a book on the old stationary forms of Yijinjing and Xianjia Baduanjin.

== Disciples ==
Notable disciples include his eldest son Cheng Pui Ki (1927-2004), nephew Woo Hsing / Wu Sing, Cheng Tin Hung/Zheng Tianxiong/鄭天熊 (1930–2005), Tang Mong Hun/Menghen Deng/鄧夢痕, Tsang Kim Chau, Liu Kang Chee, Cheung Yiu Keung, Sim Tai Chen/Shen Da Zhen/沈大正, Ma Tin Yik, Leong Fong, and Liu Kwong Sum.
