= Jiang Yukun =

- Born: 1913; Hangzhou, Zhejiang, China
- Died: 1981 (aged 67–68)
- Nationality: Chinese
- Style: Yang-style tai chi, Xingyiquan, Baguazhang, Qinna, Sanshou, Wudang Sword

Jiang Yukun (Chinese: 蒋玉堃; pinyin: Jiǎng Yùkūn; 1913–1981) was a tai chi master from China. He was a student of Yang Chengfu, and specialized in Yang-style tai chi.

Born in Hangzhou, Zhejiang, Jiang Yukun began martial arts training at the age of 7 with his uncle. Then his tai chi training began with Han Qingtang. In Zhejiang provincial Wushu Academy he became the student of Yang Chengfu when the latter was in his 30s. After passing the entrance exam of Nanjing China Central Wushu Institute, he studied Xingyiquan, Baguazhang, Qinna, Sanshou, and Wudang Sword respectively with masters Jiang Rongqiao, Huang Bainian, Wu Zhunshan, Liu Baichuan and Huang Yuanxiu.

In 1930 he became the champion in Zhejiang, in 1933 he scored the highest point in graduate exam of Nanjing China Central Wushu Institute, in 1948 he became the national champion of wrestling, in 1956 he got 2 titles in national Wushu Championship, in 1975 he was invited to be the national Wushu trainer.

Jiang Yukun studied dajia (the original Big Frame) in Yang-style tai chi system from a martial arts approach. He learned xiaojia (Small Frame) Yang-style from Gong Rongtian, who was a disciple of Yang Banshou (the 2nd generation successor of the Yang Family). Jiang also learned Chen-style tai chi from Master Chen Ziming, the 17th generation successor of the Chen Family.
