= Chen Zhenglei =

Chinese taijiquan Grandmaster

陈正雷 Chen Zhenglei
- Born: 15 May 1949 (age 76); Chenjiagou, Henan, China
- Style: Chen-style taijiquan (11th generation direct-line successor of Chen Family Taijiquan)

Chen Zhenglei (born 15 May 1949) is a Chinese taijiquan Grandmaster, who was born and raised in Chenjiagou (陳家溝), Wen County, Henan Province, China, and is the 19th generation descendant of the Chen family and 11th generation direct-line successor of Chen Family Taijiquan Chen-style taijiquan. His teachers were Chen Zhaopi and Chen Zhaokui.

== Background ==
Chen Zhenglei was born in Chenjiagou, Wen County, Henan Province, China. In 1957, Chen Zhenglei started studying Taijiquan with his uncle Chen Zhaopi, focusing not just on hands form and weapons but also Taiji theories. In 1972, after Chen Zhaopi's death, Chen Zhenglei continued studying with his uncle Chen Zhaokui, another famous Taijiquan teacher and a son of Chen Fake.

Chen Zhenglei specializes in the theories and skills of Taijiquan and push-hands, directly by his grandfather's brother Chen Fake.

He is recognized as one of four "Buddha's Warrior Attendants (Si Jingang)," the four outstanding exponents of the 19th generation in Chenjiagou. Those four Chen stylists including Chen Xiaowang (陳小旺; Chen Fake's direct grandson), Chen Zhenglei (陈正雷; 1949–), Wang Xian (王西安) and Zhu Tiancai (朱天才) traveled relentlessly giving global workshops and creating an international group of Chen-style practitioners.

He is listed in the China Contemporary Education Celebrities Dictionary, China Present Martial Arts Masters, and Contemporary reform elites.

He is the creator of the 18 Short Form of Lao Jia.

In December 1995, Chen Zhenglei was recognized as one of Top Ten Martial Arts Masters of Present Day living in China.

Since 1998, the Chinese Wushu Association together with the National Sport Commission and the Chinese Wushu Research Institute has established a graduation system based on nine Duan levels (Dan (rank)), Chen Zhenglei achieved the 9th Duan Wei Grandmaster (Jinlong—jiu duan: Gold Dragon) level in 2012, and he is one of the few holders of the highest rank of the Duan wei system.

== Author ==
He wrote and produced dozens of books and DVDs about Taijiquan; they have been translated into Japanese, English, Spanish and Korean, among others, and released in many countries.
