= Chen-style Laojia forms =

Tai chi styles

The different slow motion solo form training sequences of tai chi are the best known manifestations of tai chi performed for the general public. The forms are usually performed slowly by beginners and are designed to promote concentration, condition the body and familiarize students with the inventory of motion techniques for more advanced styles of martial arts training. There are also solo weapons forms, as well as much shorter and repetitive sequences to train power generation leverages. The laojia yi lu (Chinese: 老架一路; pinyin: lǎojià yī lù) postures listed below are the "old frame, first routine" of the Chen style with focus on silk reeling.

== Chen tai chi Laojia Yi Lu hand form ==
1. Begin tai chi (太极起势; tàijí qǐshì)
2. Buddha's Warrior Attendant Pounds Mortar (金刚捣碓; Jīngāng dǎo duì)
3. Lazily Tying Coat (懒扎衣; lǎn zhā yī)
4. Six Sealing and Four Closing (六封四闭; liù fēng sì bì)
5. Single Whip (单鞭; Dān biān)
6. Buddha's Warrior Attendant Pounds Mortar (金刚捣碓; Jīngāng dǎo duì)
7. White Crane Spreads Wings (白鹤亮翅; Bái hè liàng chì)
8. Walking Obliquely (斜行; Xié xíng)
9. Brush Knee (搂膝; Lǒu xī)
10. Stepping Forward Three Steps (上三步; Shàng sān bù)
11. Walking Obliquely (斜行; Xié xíng)
12. Brush Knee (搂膝; Lǒu xī)
13. Stepping Forward Three Steps (上三步; Shàng sān bù)
14. Hidden Thrust Punch (掩手肱拳; Yǎn shǒu gōng quán)
15. Buddha's Warrior Attendant Pounds Mortar (金刚捣碓; Jīngāng dǎo duì)
16. Draping Fist Over Body (撇身拳; Piē shēn quán)
17. Green Dragon Emerges from Water (青龙出水; Qīnglóng chūshuǐ)
18. Double Pushing Hands (双推手; Shuāng tuīshǒu)
19. Fist Under Elbow (肘底看拳; Zhǒu dǐ kàn quán)
20. Stepping Back and Wrapping Upper Arms (倒卷肱; Dào juǎn gōng)
21. White Crane Spreads Wings (白鹤亮翅; Bái hè liàng chì)
22. Walking Obliquely (斜行; Xié xíng)
23. Flashing The Back (闪通背; Shǎn tōng bèi)
24. Hidden Thrust Punch (掩手肱拳; Yǎn shǒu gōng quán)
25. Six Sealing and Four Closing (六封四闭; liù fēng sì bì)
26. Single Whip (单鞭; Dān biān)
27. Cloud Hands (云手; Yún shǒu)
28. High Patting on Horse (高探马; Gāo tànmǎ)
29. Brushing Right Foot (右擦脚; Yòu cā jiǎo)
30. Brushing Left Foot (左擦脚; Zuǒ cā jiǎo)
31. Turn and Kick with Left Heel (转身左蹬脚; Zhuǎnshēn zuǒ dēng jiǎo)
32. Stepping Forward Three Steps (上三步; Shàng sān bù)
33. Pounding the Ground (击地捶; Jī de chuí)
34. Double Jump Kick (踢二起; Tī èr qǐ)
35. Protect-the-Heart Fist (护心拳; Hù xīn quán)
36. Tornado Foot (旋风脚; Xuànfēng jiǎo)
37. Kicking with the Right Heel (右蹬脚; Yòu dēng jiǎo)
38. Hidden Thrust Punch (掩手肱拳; Yǎn shǒu gōng quán)
39. Small Catch and Hit (小擒打; Xiǎo qín dǎ)
40. Embracing Head and Pushing Mountain (抱头推山; Bào tóu tuī shān)
41. Six Sealing and Four Closing (六封四闭; liù fēng sì bì)
42. Single Whip (单鞭; Dān biān)
43. Forward Move (前招; Qián zhāo)
44. Backward Move (后招; Hòu zhāo)
45. Parting the Wild Horse's Mane (野马分鬃; Yěmǎ fēn zōng)
46. Six Sealing and Four Closing (六封四闭; liù fēng sì bì)
47. Single Whip (单鞭; Dān biān)
48. Fair Maiden Works Shuttles (玉女穿梭; Yùnǚ chuānsuō)
49. Lazily Tying Coat (懒扎衣; lǎn zhā yī)
50. Six Sealing and Four Closing (六封四闭; liù fēng sì bì)
51. Single Whip (单鞭; Dān biān)
52. Cloud Hands (云手; Yún shǒu)
53. Swing Foot Drop Down (擺腳跌叉; Bǎi jiǎo diē chā)
54. Golden Rooster Stands on One Leg (金鸡独立; Jīnjī dúlì)
55. Stepping Back and Wrapping Upper Arms (倒卷肱; Dào juǎn gōng)
56. White Crane Spreads Wings (白鹤亮翅; Bái hè liàng chì)
57. Walking Obliquely (斜行; Xié xíng)
58. Flashing The Back (闪通背; Shǎn tōng bèi)
59. Hidden Thrust Punch (掩手肱拳; Yǎn shǒu gōng quán)
60. Six Sealing and Four Closing (六封四闭; liù fēng sì bì)
61. Single Whip (单鞭; Dān biān)
62. Cloud Hands (云手; Yún shǒu)
63. High Patting on Horse (高探马; Gāo tànmǎ)
64. Crossed Feet (十字单摆莲; Shízì dān bǎi lián)
65. Punch the Groin (指裆捶; Zhǐ dāng chuí)
66. White Ape Presents Fruit (白猿献果; Bái yuán xiàn guǒ)
67. Single Whip (单鞭; Dān biān)
68. Dragon on the Ground (雀地龙; Què de lóng)
69. Stepping Forward to Form the Seven Stars (上步七星; Shàng bù qīxīng)
70. Stepping Back to Ride the Tiger (退步跨虎; Tuìbù kuà hǔ)
71. Turn Back and Double Wave Lotus (转身双摆莲; Zhuǎnshēn shuāng bǎi lián)
72. Head On Blow (当头炮; Dāngtóu pào)
73. Buddha's Warrior Attendant Pounds Mortar (金刚捣碓; Jīngāng dǎo duì)
74. Close tai chi Form (太极收势; Tàijí shōu shì)

== Chen tai chi Laojia Er Lu hand form ==
1. Beginning the Form (预备势; Yùbèi shì)
2. Buddha's Warrior Attendant Pounds Mortar (金刚捣碓; Jīngāng dǎo duì)
3. Lazily Tying Coat (懒扎衣; Lǎn zhā yī)
4. Six Sealings and Four Closings (六封四闭; Liù fēng sì bì)
5. Single Whip (单鞭; Dān biān)
6. Overturning Flowers and Waving Sleeves (翻花舞袖; Fān huā wǔ xiù)
7. Protect the Heart Fist (护心拳; Hù xīn quán)
8. Walking Obliquely (斜行; Xié xíng)
9. Buddha's Warrior Attendant Turns Around and Pounds Mortar (回头金刚捣碓; Huítóu jīngāng dǎo duì)
10. The Punch of Draping over Body (撇身捶; Piē shēn chuí)
11. Point to the Crotch (指裆; Zhǐ dāng)
12. Chopping Hands (斩手; Zhǎn shǒu)
13. Overturning Flowers and Waving Sleeves (翻花舞袖; Fān huā wǔ xiù)
14. The Fist of Covering Hand and Arm (掩手肱拳; Yǎn shǒu gōng quán)
15. Dragging the Waist and Hitting with the Elbow (腰拦肘; Yāo lán zhǒu)
16. Wave Hands (大肱拳小肱拳; Dà gōng quán xiǎo gōng quán)
17. Jade Girl Works at Shuttles (玉女穿梭; Yùnǚ chuānsuō)
18. Riding Dragon Backwards (倒骑龙; Dào qí lóng)
19. The Fist of Covering Hand and Arm (掩手肱拳; Yǎn shǒu gōng quán)
20. Wrapping Firecrackers (里变里变; Lǐ biàn lǐ biàn)
21. Beast Head Pose (兽头式; Shòu tóu shì)
22. Wearing a Frame (披架子; Pī jiàzi)
23. Overturning Flowers and Waving Sleeves (翻花舞袖; Fān huā wǔ xiù)
24. The Fist of Covering Hand and Arm (掩手肱拳; Yǎn shǒu gōng quán)
25. Subduing the Tiger (伏虎; Fú hǔ)
26. The Arm Brushes the Eyebrow (抹眉肱; Mǒ méi gōng)
27. Yellow Dragon Stirs the Water Three Times (黄龙三搅水; Huánglóng sān jiǎo shuǐ)
28. Left Thrust Kick (左冲; Zuǒ chōng)
29. Right Thrust Kick (右冲; Yòu chōng)
30. The Fist of Covering Hand and Arm (掩手肱拳; Yǎn shǒu gōng quán)
31. Sweeping Legs (扫堂褪; Sǎo táng tuǐ)
32. The Fist of Covering Hand and Arm (掩手肱拳; Yǎn shǒu gōng quán)
33. The Whole Cannon Fist (全炮捶; Quán pào chuí)
34. The Fist of Covering Hand and Arm (掩手肱拳; Yǎn shǒu gōng quán)
35. Double Forearm Punches (捣叉捣叉; Dǎo chā dǎo chā)
36. Left and Right Forearm Punches (左二肱右二肱; Zuǒ èr gōng yòu èr gōng)
37. Turning Around Forearm Punches (回头当门炮; Huítóu dāng mén pào ?)
38. Punches under the Armpits (窝底大捉炮; Wō dǐ dà zhuō pào)
39. Dragging the Waist and Hitting with the Elbow (腰拦肘; Yāo lán zhǒu)
40. Hitting with Elbow (顺拦肘; Shùn lán zhǒu)
41. Side Lower Punch (窝底炮; Wō dǐ pào)
42. Turning Around Elbows (回头井拦直入; Huítóu jǐng lán zhírù)
43. Buddha's Warrior Attendant Pounds the Mortar (金刚捣碓; Jīngāng dǎo duì)
44. Closing the form (收势; Shōu shì)

== Single Straight Sword 49 movements (Dan Jian) ==
1. Taijijian Beginning Posture (太极剑初势; Tàijí jiàn chū shì)
2. Face the Sun (朝阳剑; Zhāoyáng jiàn)
3. Immortal Pointing the Way (仙人指路; Xiānrén zhǐ lù)
4. Green Dragon Flies Out of Water (青龙出水; Qīnglóng chūshuǐ)
5. Sword protects the knees (护膝剑; Hùxī jiàn)
6. Closing the Gate Form (闭门式; Bì mén shì)
7. Green Dragon Flies Out of Water (青龙出水; Qīnglóng chūshuǐ)
8. Turn Body And Chop with Sword (翻身下斩剑; Fānshēn xià zhǎn jiàn)
9. Green Dragon Turns Its Body (青龙转身; Qīnglóng zhuǎnshēn)
10. Diagonal Flying Form (斜飞式; Xié fēi shì)
11. Spread Wings and Bow Head (展翅点头; Zhǎnchì diǎntóu)
12. Parting Grass To Find the Snake (拨草寻蛇; Bō cǎo xún shé)
13. Gold Rooster Stand on One Leg (金鸡独立; Jīnjī dúlì)
14. Immortal Pointing the Way (仙人指路; Xiānrén zhǐ lù)
15. Cover and Pull Back (盖拦式; Gài lán shì)
16. Ancient Tree Roots (古树盘根; Gǔ shù pán gēn)
17. Hungry Tiger Pounces on Prey (饿虎扑食; È hǔ pū shí)
18. Green Dragon Swings Its Tail (青龙摆尾; Qīnglóng bǎi wěi)
19. Backward Arm Circling (倒卷肱; Dào juǎn gōng)
20. Wild Horse Leaping Ravine (野马跳涧; Yěmǎ tiào jiàn)
21. White Snake Spits Out (白蛇吐信; Báishé tǔ xìn)
22. Black Dragon Swings Tail (乌龙摆尾; Wū lóng bǎi wěi)
23. Zhong Kui's Sword (钟馗仗剑; Zhōngkuí zhàng jiàn)
24. Luohan Subduing Dragon (罗汉降龙; Luóhàn xiáng lóng)
25. Black Bear Turns Backward (黑熊反背; Hēixióng fǎn bèi)
26. Swallow Pecks the Mud (燕子啄泥; Yànzi zhuó ní)
27. White Snake Spits Out (白蛇吐信; Báishé tǔ xìn)
28. Diagonal Flying Form (斜飞式; Xié fēi shì)
29. Eagle & Bear's Battle of Wits (鹰熊斗智; Yīng xióng dòuzhì)
30. Swallow Pecks the Mud (燕子啄泥; Yànzi zhuó ní)
31. Pluck Star and Return It (摘星换斗; Zhāi xīng huàn dòu)
32. Scoop Moon from Under the Sea (海底捞月; Hǎidǐ lāo yuè)
33. Immortal Pointing the Way (仙人指路; Xiānrén zhǐ lù)
34. Phoenix Nods Its Head (凤凰点头; Fènghuáng diǎntóu)
35. Swallow Pecks the Mud (燕子啄泥; Yànzi zhuó ní)
36. White Snake Spits Out (白蛇吐信; Báishé tǔ xìn)
37. Diagonal Flying Form (斜飞式; Xié fēi shì)
38. Push A Thousand Jin Leftward (左托千斤; Zuǒ tuō qiānjīn)
39. Push A Thousand Jin Rightward (右托千斤; Yòu tuō qiānjīn)
40. Swallow Pecks the Mud (燕子啄泥; Yànzi zhuó ní)
41. White Ape Presents Fruits (白猿献果; Bái yuán xiàn guǒ)
42. Flowers Falling Form (落花式; Luòhuā shì)
43. Jab Upward then Downward (上下斜刺; Shàngxià xié cì)
44. Diagonal Flying Form (斜飞式; Xié fēi shì)
45. Nezha Searches the Sea (哪吒探海; Nǎ zhā tàn hǎi)
46. Python Turns Itself Around (怪蟒翻身; Guài mǎng fānshēn)
47. Weituo Presents Pounder (韦驼献杵; Wéi tuó xiàn chǔ)
48. Mill Stone Turning Sword (磨盘剑; Mòpán jiàn)
49. Return to Original Posture (太极剑还源; Tàijí jiàn hái yuán)

== Single saber 23 movements (Dan Dao) ==
1. Preparation stance (预备式; yùbèi shì)
2. Shielding heart with saber (頀 心刀; Hù Xīn Dāo)
3. Green dragon leaves water (靑龍出手; Qīnglóng Chū Shuǐ)
4. Wind tearing wilted flower (風卷殘花; Fēng Juǎn Cán Huā)
5. White cloud moves overhead (白雲益頂; Bái Yún Yì Dǐng)
6. Black tiger searches mountain (黑虎搜山; Hēi Hǔ Sōu Shān)
7. Su Qin carries sword on back (蘇秦背劍; Sū Qín Bēi Jiàn)
8. Golden rooster stands on one leg (金鷄獨立; Jīn Jī Dúlì)
9. Face forward, then roll away (迎鋒滾閉; Yíng Fēng Gǔn Bì)
10. Slice the white snake in two (腰斬白蛇; Yāo Zhǎn Bái Shé)
11. The sun turns three times (日套三環; Rì Tào Sān Huán)
12. Scatter clouds to see the sun (拔云望日; Bō Yún Wàng Rì)
13. Parting the grass to find the snake (right side) (右拔草尋蛇; Yòu Bō Cǎo Xún Shé)
14. Parting the grass to find the snake (left side) (左拔草尋蛇; Zuǒ Bō Cǎo Xún Shé)
15. Green dragon leaves water (靑龍出手; Qīnglóng Chū Shuǐ)
16. Wind tearing wilted flower (風卷殘花; Fēng Juǎn Cán Huā)
17. Wild goose tucks golden wings (雁別金翅; 雁別金翅)
18. Yecha searches the sea (夜叉探海; Yèchā Tàn Hǎi)
19. Turn right then chop down (右翻身砍; Yòu Fān Shēn Kǎn)
20. Turn left then chop down (左翻身砍; Zuǒ Fān Shēn Kǎn)
21. White snake spits out its tongue (白蛇吐信; Bái Shé Tǔ Xìn)
22. Embracing the moon (怀中抱月; Huái Zhōng Bào Yuè)
23. Closing stance (收式; Shōu shì)
