= Tchoung Ta-chen =

Chinese martial artist

Tchoung Ta-tchen 鍾大振
- Died: February 22, 2000
- Nationality: Chinese
- Style: Yang-style tai chi

Other information
- Occupation: Martial arts teacher

Tchoung Ta-chen
- Chinese: 鍾大振
Transcriptions
Standard Mandarin
- Hanyu Pinyin: Zhōng Dàzhèn

Tchoung Ta-tchen or Zhong Dazhen was a martial arts teacher from China who developed his own version of Yang-style tai chi. He died on February 22, 2000.

== Dual method of the Old Form of Yang-style tai chi ==
Tchoung Ta-tchen developed his own form based on the Yang style of tai chi.

As a young man Tchoung studied his family's style of tai chi and tui na (massage). He also was a track athlete. He became a professional soldier and army officer.

In 1943, he studied qigong and tai chi with Abbott Hui Kung, at the Omei Monastery in Sichuan province. He learned baguazhang and Yiquan from his friend Wang Shu Chin and Xingyiquan from his friend Yuan Tao.

Tchoung studied with Shi Tiao Mei who was a student of Tian Zhaolin. Tian was a disciple of Yang Jianhou.

Tchoung also studied with Hsiung Yang-ho, who was one of the few disciples of Yang Shaohou. Hsiung also taught Tchoung's friend Liang Tsung-tsai. Tchoung and Liang were workout partners. Tchoung was also a pushing hands partner of Cheng Man-ch'ing. Liang was Cheng's teaching assistant in Taiwan but had several other teachers as well. Kuo Lien-ying was another of Tchoung's practice partners.

Tchoung was a member of the Taiwan-based Chinese Tai Chi Ch'uan Association (CTCCA). The CTCCA was a multi style group of tai chi masters. The association made Tchoung a delegate and he traveled to Africa to teach tai chi to President Bongo of Gabon. Tchoung then traveled to South Africa where he taught for some time. Eventually, he moved to Vancouver BC, Canada. He taught in Vancouver and Seattle, Washington.

== Continued teaching of his system ==
His students who continue to teach his system include Andrew Dale, Harvey Kurland, Tim Glasheen, Peter Dickson, Laurens Lee, and Donald Scott. Tchoung taught his evolving version of tai chi in Vancouver, British Columbia, and in Seattle, Washington. His primary school was in Vancouver's Chinatown. He became a popular tai chi teacher in the Pacific Northwest in the 1970s.

=== Public ceremony in 1986 ===
Tchoung officially authorized a few of his advanced students to teach his system. In a public ceremony in 1986 Tchoung said only five students in the USA could teach his system at that time. Those were Carey Brooks, Andrew Dale, David Harris, Harvey Kurland and Don Scott. There are several teachers of his system who are currently teaching, including the following direct students in the United States: Andrew Dale, David Harris, Don Scott in Seattle, Washington and Harvey Kurland in Riverside, California. Several of his students are teaching in Canada, including Tim Glasheen in Vancouver, BC, Peter Dickson in Terrace, BC, John Camp in White Rock, BC, and Eric Eastman in Nelson, BC, Canada. Most of Tchoung's official students pictures can be found in Tchoung's text (Tchoung 1995).

== Philosophy ==
According to Kurland, "Tchoung's philosophy was to teach his students everything he could. Not hold back, as many teachers did. That is the reason so many students left their previous schools to study with him. He tells his students from the beginning that he can teach them the method, but it is up to them as to what they do with it. That is if they do not train hard, they will not achieve their potential. He says there are no magical secret, just hard training and coaching. He saw that there was a decay in t'ai-chi ch'uan quality in China and the world. That is the art was becoming conceptually a calisthenics exercise or performance art, and the old martial value and traditional method was being lost."

"Tchoung felt the previous generation's skill being lost or watered down was due to the concept of always holding a little back from the student (as well as intentional persecuting of the art and modernizing it on the mainland). So every generation lost a little more, so now even the top names were merely shells of the older art, very few had any real skill."
