= Neijia =

Group of Chinese martial arts

- Chinese: 內家
- Hanyu Pinyin: nèi jiā
- Literal meaning: internal family
Transcriptions
Standard Mandarin
- Hanyu Pinyin: nèi jiā
- Wade–Giles: nei^{4} chia^{1}
Yue: Cantonese
- Jyutping: noi6 gaa1
Eastern Min
- Fuzhou BUC: nô̤i-gă

Wudangquan
- Traditional Chinese: 武當拳
- Hanyu Pinyin: wǔ dāng quán
Transcriptions
Standard Mandarin
- Hanyu Pinyin: wǔ dāng quán
Yue: Cantonese
- Yale Romanization: mou5 dong1 kyun4

Neijia (內家) is the collective name for the internal Chinese martial arts. It relates to those martial arts occupied with spiritual, mental or qi-related aspects, as opposed to an "external" approach focused on physiological aspects. The distinction dates to the 17th century, but its modern application is due to publications by Sun Lutang, dating to the period of 1915 to 1928. Neijin is developed by using neigong or "internal changes", contrasted with waigong (外功; wàigōng) or "external exercises".

Wudangquan is a more specific grouping of internal martial arts named for their association in popular Chinese legend with the Taoist monasteries of the Wudang Mountains in Hubei province. These styles were enumerated by Sun Lutang as tai chi, xingyiquan and baguazhang, but most also include bajiquan and the legendary Wudang Sword.

Some other Chinese arts, not in the wudangquan group, such as qigong, liuhebafa, Bak Mei Pai, ziranmen (Nature Boxing), Bok Foo Pai and yiquan are frequently classified (or classify themselves) as "internal".

== History ==
=== Qing China ===
The term neijia and the distinction between internal and external martial arts first appears in Huang Zongxi's 1669 Epitaph for Wang Zhengnan. Stanley Henning proposes that the Epitaph's identification of the internal martial arts with the Taoism indigenous to China and of the external martial arts with the foreign Buddhism of Shaolin—and the Manchu Qing Dynasty to which Huang Zongxi was opposed—was an act of political defiance rather than one of technical classification.

In 1676 Huang Zongxi's son, Huang Baijia, who learned martial arts from Wang Zhengnan, compiled the earliest extant manual of internal martial arts, the Neijia Quanfa.

=== Republic of China ===
Beginning in 1914, Sun Lutang together with Yang Shaohou, Yang Chengfu and Wu Jianquan taught tai chi to the public at the Beijing Physical Education Research Institute. Sun taught there until 1928, a seminal period in the development of modern Yang, Wu and Sun-style tai chi. Sun Lutang also published martial arts texts starting in 1915.

In 1928, Kuomintang generals Li Jinglin, Chang Chih-chiang, and Fung Zuziang organized a national martial arts tournament in China; they did so to screen the best martial artists in order to begin building the Central Guoshu Institute. The generals separated the participants of the tournament into Shaolin and Wudang. Wudang participants were recognized as having "internal" skills. These participants were generally practitioners of tai chi, xingyiquan and baguazhang. All other participants competed under the classification of Shaolin. One of the winners in the "internal" category was the baguazhang master Fu Zhensong.

== Sun Lutang ==
Sun Lutang identified the following as the criteria that distinguish an internal martial art:

1. An emphasis on the use of the Shen (mind)to coordinate the leverage of the relaxed body as opposed to the use of strength.
2. The internal development, circulation, and expression of qi, the "vital energy" of classical Chinese medical philosophy.
3. The application of Taoist daoyin, qigong, and neigong principles of unification of the internal intention with external movement.

Sun Lutang's eponymous style of tai chi fuses principles from all three arts he named as neijia. Similarities applying classical principles between tai chi, xingyiquan, and baquazhang include: Loosening (song) the soft tissue, opening shoulder and hip gates or gua, cultivating qi or intrinsic energy, issuing various jin or compounded energies. Tai chi is characterized by an ever-present peng jin or expanding energy. Xingyiquan is characterized by its solely forward moving pressing ji jin energy. Baguazhang is characterized by its "dragon body" circular movements. Some Chinese martial arts other than the ones Sun named also teach what are termed internal practices, despite being generally classified as external (e.g. Wing Chun that also is internal). Some non-Chinese East Asian martial arts also claim to be examples of internal arts that includeAikido and Kito Ryu. A number of martial artists, especially outside of China, disregard the distinction entirely.

== Training ==
Internal styles focus on awareness of the spirit, mind, qi and the use of relaxed (sōng 鬆) leverage rather than muscular tension. Pushing hands is a training method commonly used in neijia arts to develop sensitivity and softness.

Much time may nevertheless be spent on basic physical training, such as stance training (zhan zhuang), stretching, elongating and strengthening of muscles, as well as on empty hand and weapon forms that within these styles can be seen as quite demanding.

Some forms in internal styles are performed slowly, sometimes including sudden outbursts of explosive movements (fa jin), such as those the Chen style of tai chi is famous for teaching. At an advanced level, and in actual fighting, internal styles are performed quickly, but the goal is to learn to involve the entire body in every motion, to stay relaxed, with deep, controlled breathing, and to coordinate the motions of the body and the breathing accurately according to the dictates of the forms while maintaining perfect balance.

== Characteristics ==
External styles are characterized by fast and explosive movements and a focus on physical strength and agility. External styles include both the traditional styles focusing on application and fighting, as well as the modern styles adapted for competition and exercise. Examples of external styles are Shaolin kung fu, with its direct explosive attacks and multiple wushu forms that have spectacular aerial techniques. External styles begin with a training focus on muscular power, speed and application, and generally integrate their qigong aspects in advanced training, after their desired "hard" physical level has been reached.

Currently, some people believe that there is no difference between "internal" and "external" systems of the Chinese martial arts, while other well known teachers have expressed differing opinions. For example, the tai chi teacher Wu Jianquan:

Those who practice [Shaolin kung fu] leap about with strength and force; people not proficient at this kind of training soon lose their breath and are exhausted. Tai chi is unlike this. Strive for quiescence of body, mind and intention.

== Current practice ==
Many internal schools teach forms that are practised for health benefits only. Thus, tai chi in spite of its roots in martial arts has become similar in scope to qigong, the purely meditative practice based on notions of circulation of qi. As a health practice, tai chi classes have become popular in hospitals, clinics, community and senior centers as the art's reputation as a low-stress exercise for seniors became better known.

Traditionalists feel that a school not teaching martial aspects somewhere in their syllabus cannot be said to be actually teaching the art itself, that they have accredited themselves prematurely. Traditional teachers also believe that understanding the core theoretical principles of neijia and the ability to apply them are a necessary gateway to health benefits.

== Fiction ==
Internal styles have been associated in legend and in much popular fiction with the Taoist monasteries of the Wudang Mountains in central China.

Neijia are a common theme in Chinese wuxia novels and films, and are usually represented as originating in Wudang or similar mythologies. Often, genuine internal practices are highly exaggerated to the point of making them seem miraculous, as in the novels of Jin Yong and Gu Long. Internal concepts have also been a source of comedy, such as in the films Shaolin Soccer and Kung Fu Hustle.

In the Naruto series, Neji Hyūga's name and techniques were based on neijia.

== See also ==
- Dantian
- Neidan
- Neo-Confucianism
- Taijitu
- Waijia

== General bibliography ==
- Pa Kwa Chang Journal, vol. 1
- Pa Kwa Chang Journal, vol. 2
- Pa Kwa Chang Journal, vol. 5
- Pa Kwa Chang Journal, vol. 6
- Fu, Wing Fay; Lai, Zonghong (1998), Fu Style Dragon Form Eight Trigrams Palms, Crandall, Joseph transl, Smiling Tiger Martial Arts
- Shahar, Meir (December 2001), "Ming-Period Evidence of Shaolin Martial Practice", Harvard Journal of Asiatic Studies, 61 (2): 359–413, doi:10.2307/3558572, JSTOR 3558572, S2CID 91180380
