= Silk reeling =

Chinese martial arts principles

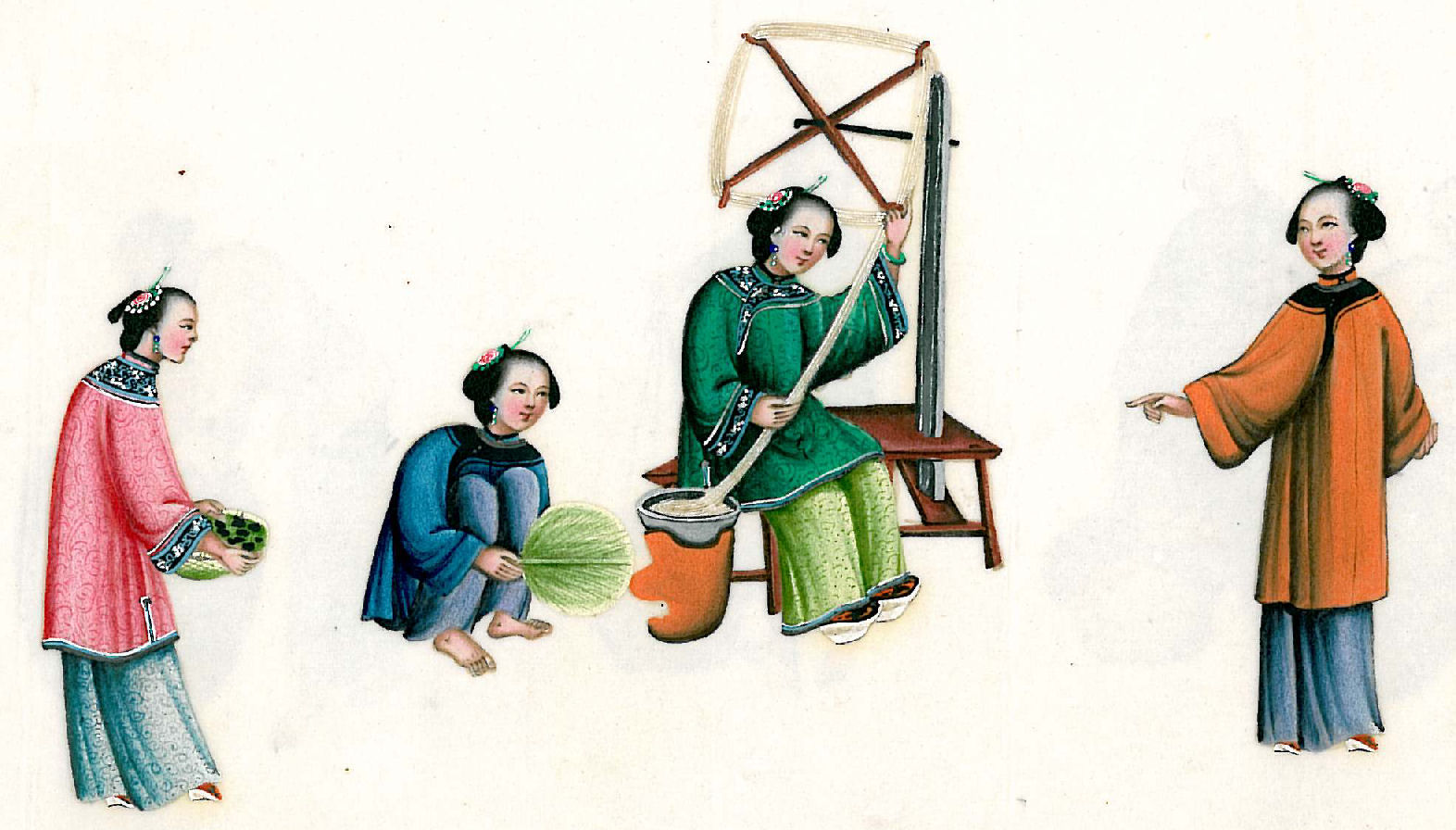
Women winding silk onto a reel

Silk reeling (Chinese: 纏絲; pinyin: chánsī; Wade–Giles: ch'an^{2} ssu^{1}) refers to a set of neigong (內功, internal) movement principles expressed in traditional styles of tai chi (太極拳), but especially emphasized by the Chen and Wu styles.

The name derives from the twisting and spiralling movements of the silkworm larva as it wraps itself in its cocoon, and to the metaphorical principle of "reeling the silk from a silk worm's cocoon". Dozens of cocoons are placed into boiling water. A single strand comes from each cocoon. In order to draw out the silk successfully, the action must be smooth and consistent without jerking or changing direction sharply. Too fast and the silk breaks, too slow and it sticks to itself and becomes tangled. The pot is then stirred and each cocoon spins as the silk unwinds. Each filament twists through a single point to become thread. The thread is usually pulled over a wheel and wound onto a spool. Thus silk reeling movements are rotations within rotations that must be continuous, cyclic, focused, twisting and untwisting actions. Silk reeling is a core method of movement and is trained throughout the curriculum including solo forms, individual solo exercises (chan si gong), as well as in two-person work (push hands).

As described by Wu Kung-tsao:

This resembles the strands of spun silk. Winding silk energy is applied in pushing hands when opponents probe, use locking maneuvers, neutralize, vie for control, and practice tactical movements around each other's space. There are six methods of winding silk energy: inner, outer, upper, lower, forward and backward. They are applied from anywhere on the body: the arms, legs, hips and waist, with the body moving continuously, with endless circularity, wrapped together like intertwined filaments of silk.
...
One who is skilled at winding silk energy is keenly sensitive and can accurately probe and stay with the opponent as he extends and contracts.

The method for silk reeling in the human body was described and illustrated in Chen Xin's classic, Chen Style Taijiquan Illustrated and Explained (陳氏太極拳圖說; Chén shì tàijí quán túshuō) published posthumously in 1933. It charted the paths of force and movement as they wrapped around the body. Silk-reeling (纏絲; chán sī) was most notable in the rotations in the extremities. Shùn chán (順纏, following coiling, or rotation) and nì chán (逆纏, opposing coiling) were used to describe the rotations of the extremities that create inward and outward arcs of movement, respectively. This rotation in the extremities was originated and coordinated by rotation of the torso centered in the dantian.

Chán sī jìn (纏絲勁) is not easily translated but refers to the development of a spiral (helical) refined force—rather than brute strength—and the ability to direct that to a point of application. Chán sī gōng (纏絲功), literally, chan si work, refers to performing solo training exercises aimed at learning and improving one's understanding and ability to perform silk reeling.

In Chen-style tai chi, silk reeling is the method used to coordinate the parts of the body to achieve whole-body movement: when one part moves, all parts move, or, when the dantian moves, the whole body moves. As the spiraling becomes internalized, an observer may only see the rolling of a limb, a hand turning over, or little movement at all. It also is the primary method for circulating "qi" from the centre (dantian) to the extremities and back from the extremities to the centre.

In Chen-style tai chi, silk reeling has nothing to do with tracing tai chi diagrams with hands or feet.
