= Pushing hands =

Two-person training routine

Tuishou
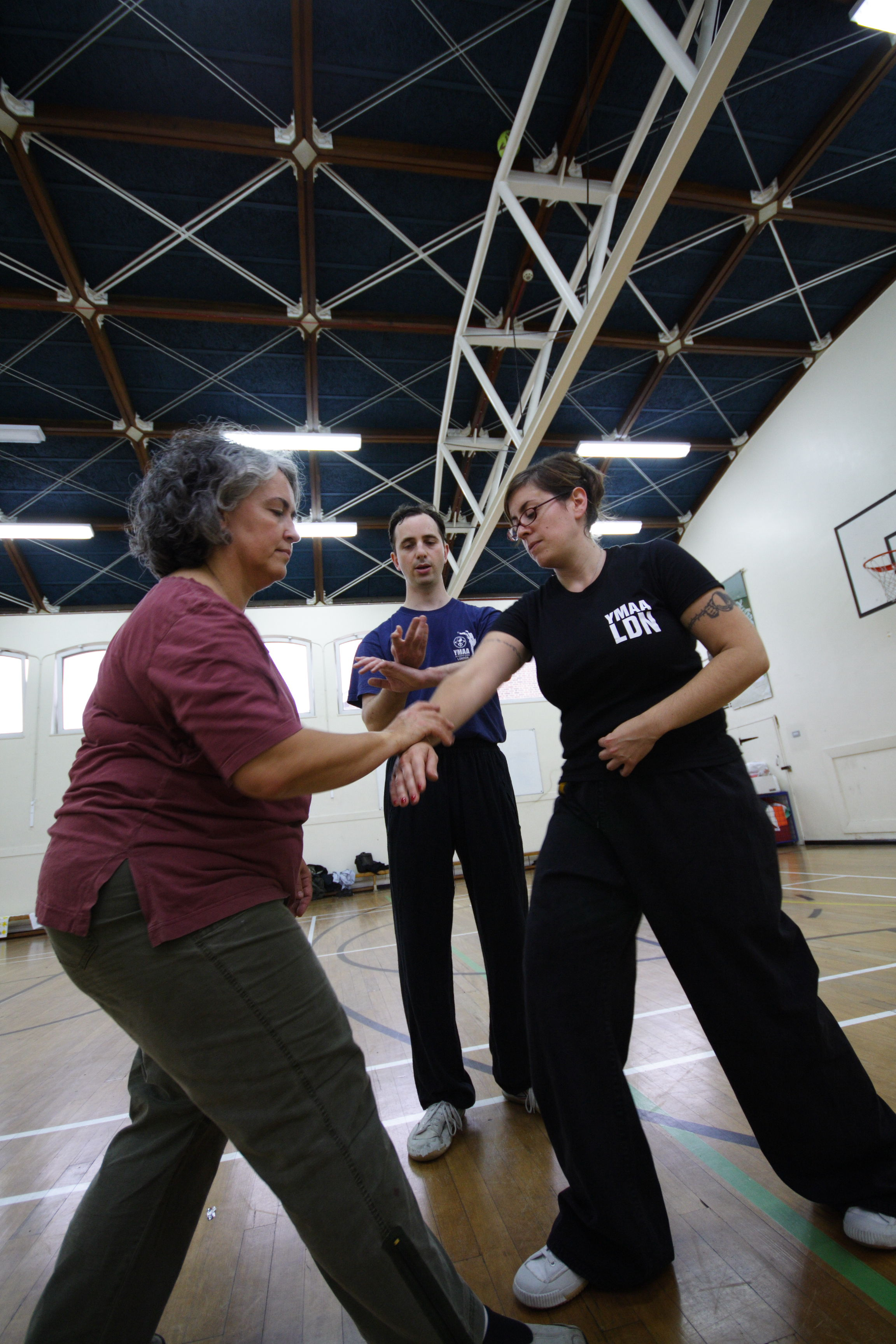
- Two students receive instruction in tuishou
- Chinese: 推手
Transcriptions
Standard Mandarin
- Hanyu Pinyin: tuī shǒu
- Wade–Giles: t'ui^{1} shou^{3}
Yue: Cantonese
- Jyutping: teoi1 sau2

Pushing hands, push hands or tuishou (also spelled tuei shou or tuei sho) is a two-person training routine practiced in internal Chinese martial arts such as baguazhang, xingyiquan, tai chi, and yiquan. It is also played as an international sport akin to judo, sumo and wrestling, such as in Taiwan, where the biannual Tai Chi World Cup is held.

== Overview ==
Pushing hands is said to be the gateway for students to experientially understand the aspects of the internal martial arts: leverage, reflex, sensitivity, timing, coordination and positioning. Pushing hands works to undo a person's natural instinct to resist force with force, teaching the body to yield to force and redirect it. Some tai chi schools teach push hands to complement the physical conditioning of performing solo routines. Push hands allows students to learn how to respond to external stimuli using techniques from their forms practice. Among other things, training with a partner allows a student to develop ting jin (listening power), the sensitivity to feel the direction and strength of a partner's intention. In that sense pushing hands is a contract between students to train in the defensive and offensive movement principles of their martial art: learning to generate, coordinate and deliver power to another and also how to effectively neutralize incoming forces in a safe environment.

== History ==
According to the Chen family of tai chi teachers, pushing hands was created by Chen Wangting (1600–1680), the founder of the Chen-style tai chi, and was originally known as hitting hands (da shou) or crossing hands (ke shou). Chen was said to have devised pushing hands methods for both empty hands and when armed with a spear. Other tai chi schools attribute the invention of pushing hands to mythical Zhang Sanfeng.

== Training pushing hands ==
In tai chi, pushing hands is used to acquaint students with the principles of what are known as the "Eight Gates and Five Steps," eight different leverage applications in the arms accompanied by footwork in a range of motion, intended to allow students to defend themselves calmly and competently if attacked. Also known as the "13 original movements of tai chi", a posture expressing each one of these aspects is found in all tai chi styles. Training and pushing hands competitions generally involve contact but no strikes.

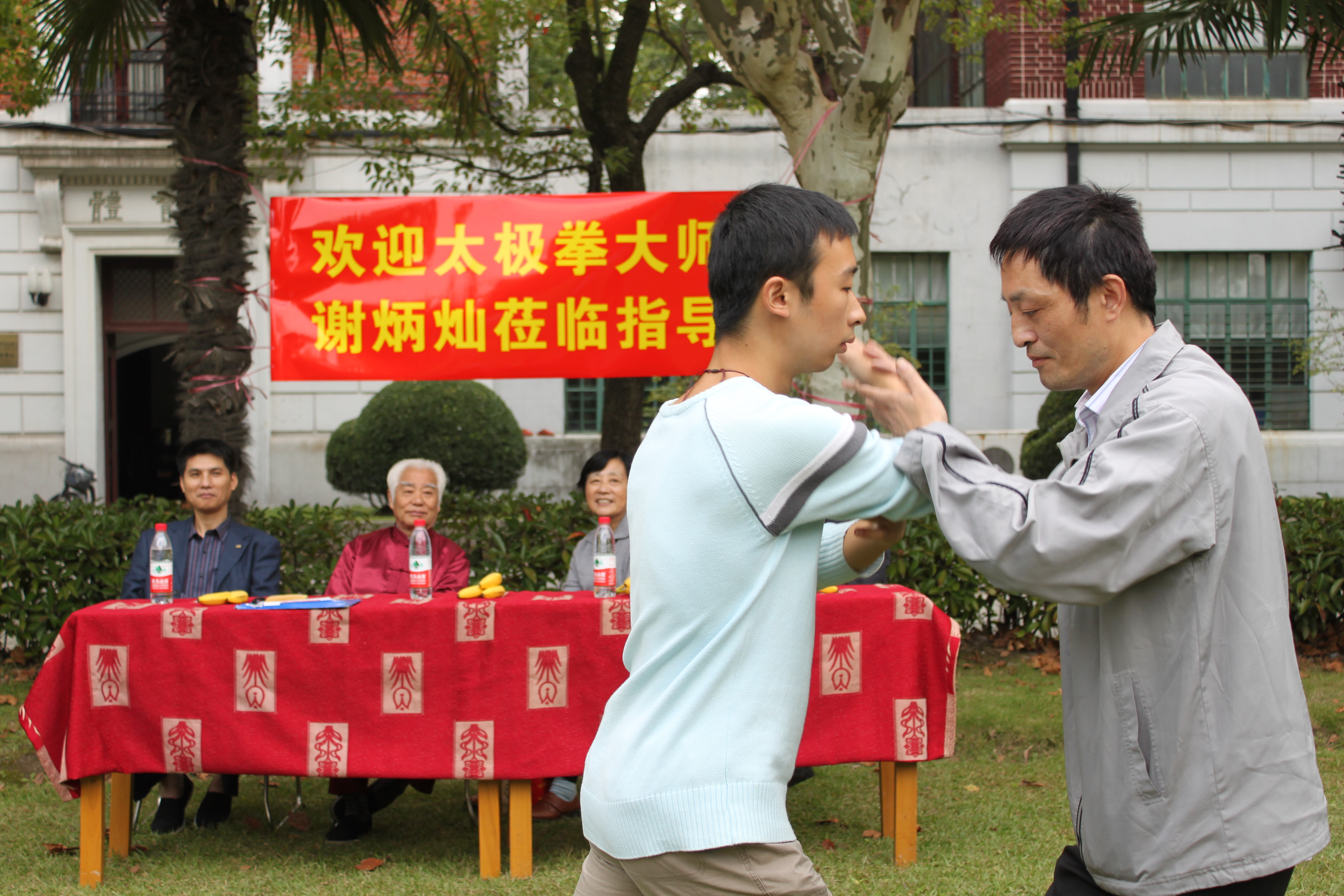
Pushing hands in Shanghai, China

The three primary principles of movement cultivated by push hands practice are:

- Rooting - Stability of stance, a highly trained sense of balance in the face of force.
- Yielding - The ability to flow with incoming force from any angle. The practitioner moves with the attacker's force fluidly without compromising their own balance.
- Release of Power (fa jin) - The application of power to an opponent. Even while applying force in push hands one maintains the principles of Yielding and Rooting at all times.

The Eight Gates (Chinese: 八門; pinyin: bā mén):

P'eng (Chinese: 掤; pinyin: péng) - An upward circular movement, forward or backward, yielding or offsetting usually with the arms to disrupt the opponent's centre of gravity, often translated as "Ward Off." Peng is also described more subtly as an energetic quality that should be present in every taiji movement as a part of the concept of "song" (鬆) -- or relaxation -- providing alertness, the strength to maintain structure when pressed, and absence of muscular tension in the body.
Lü (Chinese: 捋; pinyin: lǚ) - A sideways, circular yielding movement, often translated as "Roll Back."
Chi (simplified Chinese: 挤; traditional Chinese: 擠; pinyin: jǐ) - A pressing or squeezing offset in a direction away from the body, usually done with the back of the hand or outside edge of the forearm. Chi is often translated as "Press."
An (Chinese: 按; pinyin: àn) - To offset with the hand, usually a slight lift up with the fingers then a push down with the palm, which can appear as a strike if done quickly. Often translated as "Push."
Tsai (Chinese: 採; pinyin: cǎi) - To pluck or pick downwards with the hand, especially with the fingertips or palm. The word tsai is part of the compound that means to gather, collect or pluck a tea leaf from a branch (採茶, cǎi chá). Often translated "Pluck" or "Grasp."
Lieh (Chinese: 挒; pinyin: liè) - Lieh means to separate, to twist or to offset with a spiral motion, often while making immobile another part of the body (such as a hand or leg) to split an opponent's body thereby destroying posture and balance. Lieh is often translated as "Split."
Chou (Chinese: 肘; pinyin: zhǒu) - To strike or push with the elbow. Usually translated as "Elbow Strike" or "Elbow Stroke" or just plain "Elbow."
K'ao (Chinese: 靠; pinyin: kào) - To strike or push with the shoulder or upper back. The word k'ao implies leaning or inclining. Usually translated "Shoulder Strike," "Shoulder Stroke" or "Shoulder."

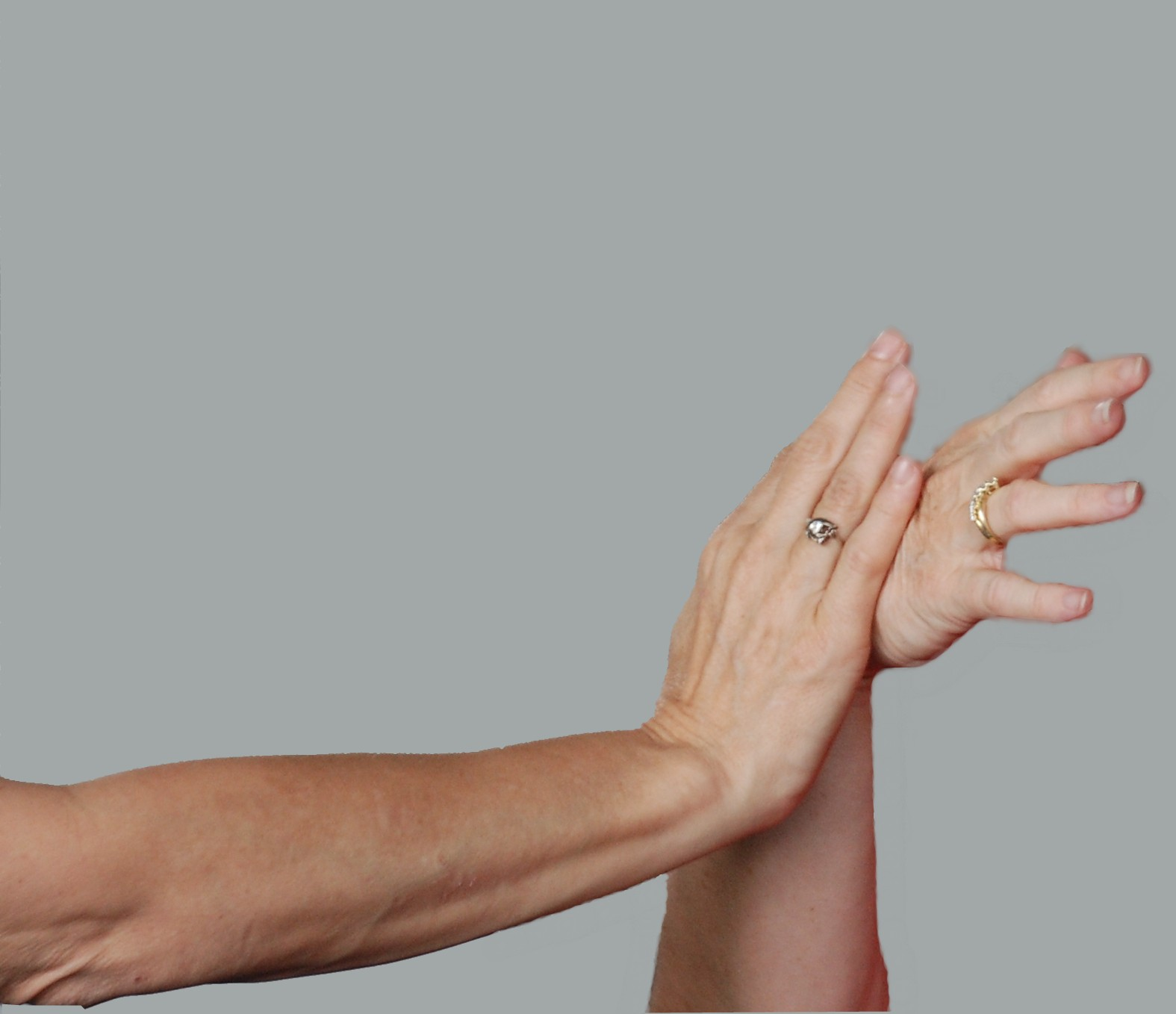
The practitioner on the right demonstrates how péng can be used to resist a push

The Five Steps (Chinese: 五步; pinyin: wǔ bù):

Chin Pu (Chinese: 進步; pinyin: jìn bù) - Forward step.
T'ui Pu (Chinese: 退步; pinyin: tùi bù) - Backward step.
Tsuo Ku (simplified Chinese: 左顾; traditional Chinese: 左顧; pinyin: zǔo gù) - Left step.
You P'an (Chinese: 右盼; pinyin: yòu pàn) - Right step.
Chung Ting (Chinese: 中定; pinyin: zhōng dìng) - The central position, balance, equilibrium. Not just the physical center, but a condition which is expected to be present at all times in the first four steps as well, associated with the concept of rooting (the stability said to be achieved by a correctly aligned, thoroughly relaxed body as a result of correct tai chi training). Chung ting can also be compared to the Taoist concept of moderation or the Buddhist "middle way" as discouraging extremes of behavior, or in this case, movement. An extreme of movement, usually characterized as leaning to one side or the other, destroys a practitioner's balance and enables defeat.

The Eight Gates are said to be associated with the eight trigrams (bagua) of the I Ching, the Five Steps with the five "phases" (Wuxing) of Taoist philosophy; metal, water, wood, fire, and earth. Collectively they are sometimes referred to as the "Thirteen Postures of Tai Chi" and their combinations and permutations are cataloged more or less exhaustively in the different styles of solo forms which tai chi is mostly known for by the general public. Pushing hands is practiced so that students have an opportunity for "hands-on" experience of the theoretical implications of the solo forms. Traditional internal teachers say that just training solo forms isn't enough to learn a martial art; that without the pushing hands, reflex and sensitivity to another's movements and intent are lost. Each component is seen as equally necessary, yin and yang, for realizing the health, meditative, and self-defense applications.

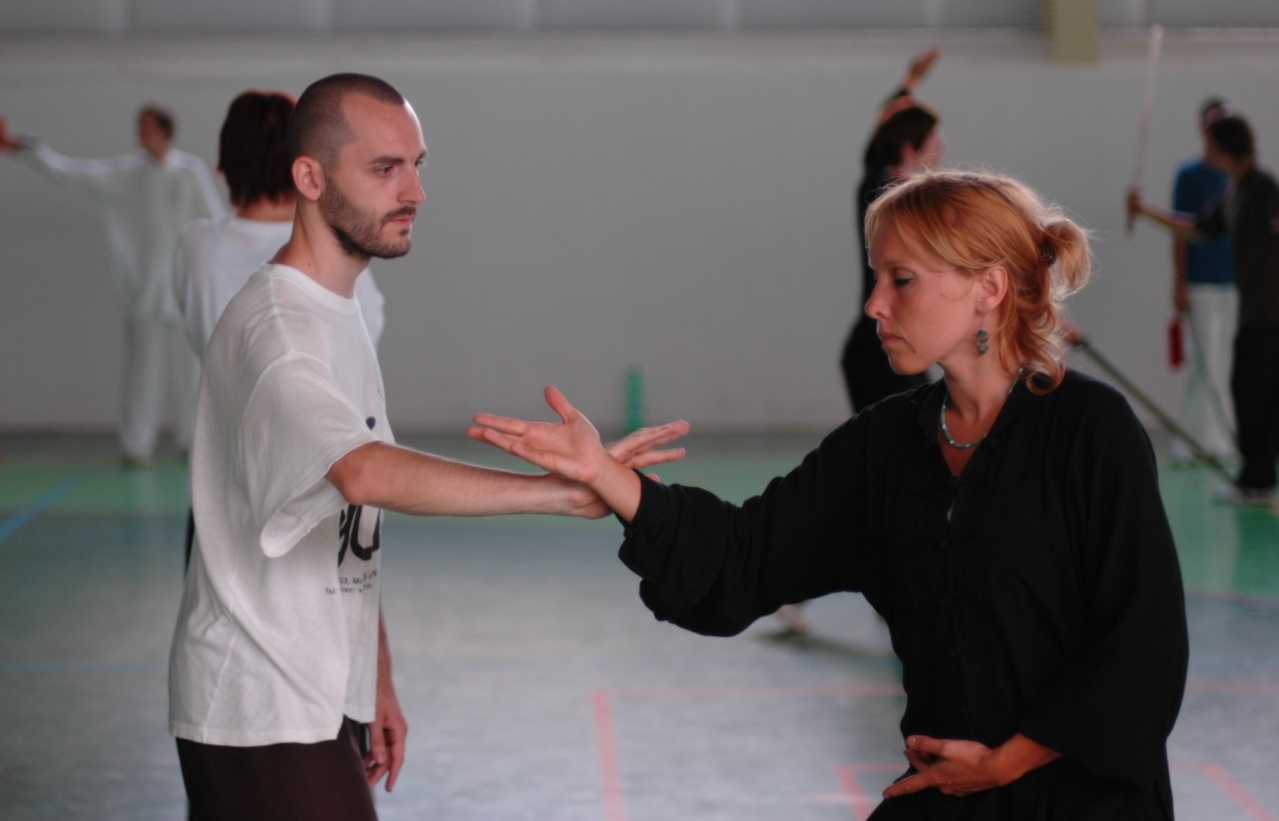
Czech students push hands

Pushing hands trains these technical principles in ever increasing complexity of patterns. At first students work basic patterns, then patterns with moving steps coordinated in different directions, patterns at differing heights (high, middle, low and combinations) and then finally different styles of "freestyle" push hands, which lead into sparring that combines closing and distancing strategies with long, medium and short range techniques. These exchanges are characterized as "question and answer" sessions between training partners; the person pushing is asking a question, the person receiving the push answers with their response. The answers should be "soft," without resistance or stiffness. The students hope to learn to not fight back when pushed nor retreat before anticipated force, but rather to allow the strength and direction of the push to determine their answer. The intent thereby is for the students to condition themselves and their reflexes to the point that they can meet an incoming force in softness, move with it until they determine its intent and then allow it to exhaust itself or redirect it into a harmless direction. The degree to which students maintain their balance while observing these requirements determines the appropriateness of their "answers." The expression used in some tai chi schools to describe this is "Give up oneself to follow another." The eventual goal for self-defense purposes is to achieve meeting the force, determining its direction and effectively redirecting it in as short a time as possible, with examples provided of seemingly instantaneous redirections at the highest levels of kung fu by traditional teachers. Pushing hands also teaches students safety habits in regard to their own vital areas, especially acupressure points, as well as introducing them to the principles of chin na and some aspects of the manipulative therapy or tui na also taught in traditional tai chi schools. At a certain point, pushing hands begins to take on aspects of qigong (chi kung), as the students learn to coordinate their movements in attack and defense with their breathing.

== Competition ==
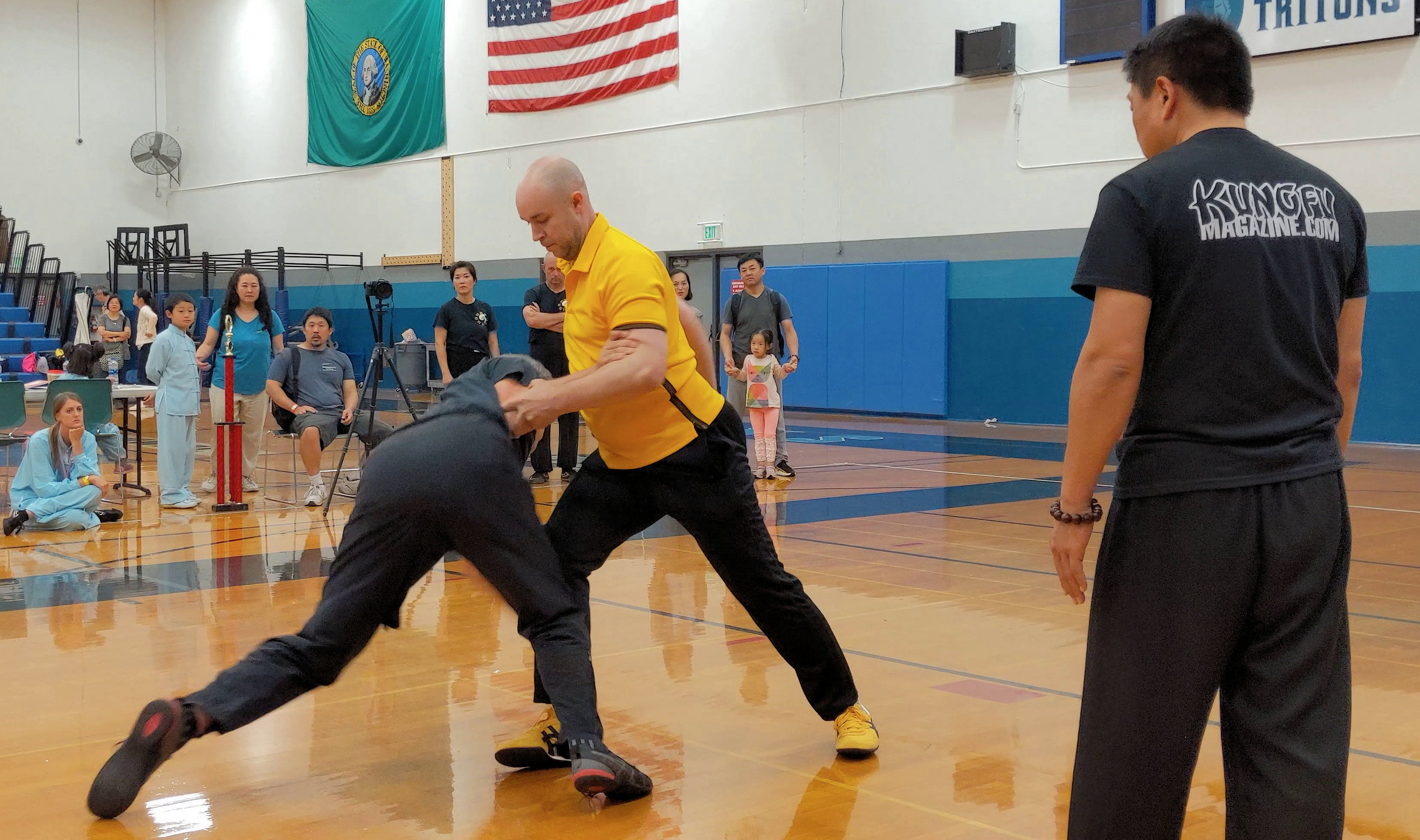
Pushing hands tournament

Pushing hands has become a part of competitive Chinese martial arts, especially those devoted to internal arts. The rules and the judging are subjective, problematic, and constantly in flux.

Push hand contests is divided into two types.

Moving step (Chinese: 活步; pinyin: huó bù) - The players stand in a circle; the player who is pushed or pulled out of the circle, or falls down, loses a point.

Fixed step (Chinese: 定步; pinyin: dìng bù) - The players stand in a small box; the player who is pushed or pulled out of the box loses a point.

== See also ==
- Chi Sao
- Dantian
- Neijia
- Neijin
- Silk reeling
- Taijitu
- Tao Te Ching
- Wudangshan
