= Wu Yuxiang =

Chinese martial artist

Wu Yuxiang 武禹襄
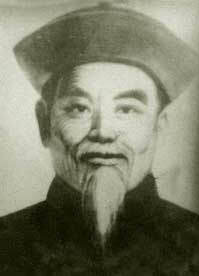
- Drawing of Wu Yuxiang
- Born: 1812?
- Died: 1880?
- Style: Wu (Hao)-style tai chi

Other information
- Notable students: Li Yiyu (李亦畬); Li Qixuan

Wu Yuxiang
- Chinese: 武禹襄
Transcriptions
Standard Mandarin
- Hanyu Pinyin: Wǔ Yǔxiāng
- Wade–Giles: Wu Yu-hsiang

Wu Yuxiang (Wu Yu-hsiang, 1812?–1880?) was a Chinese martial artist, teacher and the founder of Wu (Hao)-style tai chi. Wu was a scholar from a wealthy and influential family who became a senior student of Yang Luchan, the founder of Yang-style tai chi. Wu also studied for a brief time with Chen Qingping, a master of Chen-style and Zhaobao-style tai chi.

There is a relatively large body of writing attributed to Wu on the subject of tai chi theory, writings that are considered influential by other tai chi styles were the source of what are now known as the tai chi classics.

Wu developed his own style of tai chi and shared it with members of his family, who also wrote about the art. He trained with his two older brothers Wu Chengqing (武澄清, 1800-1884)) and Wu Ruqing (武汝清, 1803-1887), and took on two nephews as disciples. One of those nephews Li Yiyu (Li I-yu, 李亦畬, 1832–1892), authored several particularly important works on tai chi. The other nephew, Li Yiyu's younger brother Li Qixuan (Li Ch'i-hsuan, 李啟軒, 1835-1899), worked closely with Yiyu to further develop the art, and was also credited as an author of at least one work on the subject of tai chi.

The style of tai chi that Wu taught was eventually known, because of its later transmission by three generations of students of his nephew named Hao, as Wu (Hao)-style tai chi. Hao Weizhen subsequently taught Sun Lutang, the founder of Sun-style tai chi.

== Tai chi lineage tree with Wu (Hao)-style focus ==
Wu (Hao)-style tai chi lineage tree

Key:	NEIJIA
Solid lines	Direct teacher-student.
Dot lines	Partial influence /taught informally /limited time.	TAIJIQUAN
Dash lines	Individual(s) omitted.
Dash cross	Branch continues.	CHEN-STYLE	Zhaobao-style
(杨露禅); Yang Luchan; 1799–1872; YANG-STYLE	(陈清萍); Chen Qingping; 1795–1868; Chen Small Frame, Zhaobao Frame
(武禹襄); Wu Yuxiang; 1812–1880; WU (HAO)-STYLE	Zhaobao He-style
(李啟軒); Li Qixuan; 1835-1899; 2nd gen. Wu (Hao)	(李亦畬); Li Yiyu; 1832–1892; 2nd gen. Wu (Hao)
Li-style	(郝為真); Hao Weizhen; 1849–1920; 3rd gen. Wu (Hao)	(李逊之); Li Xunzhi; 1882–1944; 3rd gen. Wu (Hao)
WU-STYLE	(孙禄堂); Sun Lutang; 1861–1932; SUN-STYLE	(郝月如); Hao Yueru; 1877-1935; 4th gen. Wu (Hao)	李寶玉 (李香遠); Li Baoyu (Li Xiangyuan); 1888-1961; 4th gen. Wu (Hao)	李聖端; Li Shengduan; 1888-1948; 4th gen. Wu (Hao)	李錦藩; Li Jinfan; 4th gen. Wu (Hao)
(董英傑); Dong Yingjie; 1897–1961; 4th gen. Yang	(郝少如); Hao Shaoru; 1908-1983; 5th gen. Wu (Hao)
Wudang-style	(刘积顺); Liu Jishun; 1930-Present; 6th gen. Wu (Hao)	(李伟明); Li Weiming; 1944-Present; 6th gen. Wu (Hao)	浦公達; Pu Gongda; 1905-1997; 6th gen. Wu (Hao)
CHEN-STYLE	YANG-STYLE	WU-STYLE	SUN-STYLE	WU (HAO)-STYLE

Note:
- This lineage tree is not comprehensive, but depicts those considered the 'gate-keepers' & most recognised individuals in each generation of Wu (Hao)-style.
- Although many styles were passed down to respective descendants of the same family, the lineage focused on is that of the Wu (Hao) style & not necessarily that of the family.'
