= Wu (Hao)-style tai chi =

Chinese martial art

Wu (Hao)-style tai chi 武(郝)式太極拳
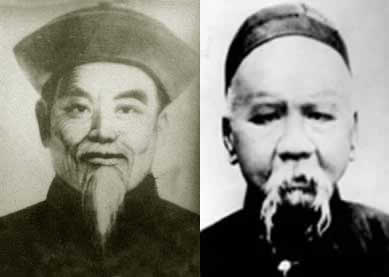
- Wu Yuxiang (left), founder, and Hao Weizhen (right), third-generation grandmaster of Wu (Hao)-style tai chi
- Also known as: Kai He tai chi (開合太極拳)
- Date founded: Mid-19th century
- Country of origin: China
- Founder: Wu Yuxiang
- Arts taught: Tai chi
- Ancestor arts: Yang-style tai chi, Chen-style tai chi
- Descendant arts: Sun-style tai chi
- Practitioners: 19th century: Li Yiyu (李亦畬); 19th-20th cent: Hao Weizhen; Li Xunzhi (李逊之); Hao Yueru (郝月如); Li Baoyu (李寶玉); Li Shengduan (李聖端); 20th century: Hao Shaoru (郝少如); Yao Jizu (姚繼祖); Chen Gu'an (陳固安); Wu Wenhan (吴文翰); 20th-21st cent: Zhai Weichuan (翟维传); Liu Jishun (刘积顺); Jimmy K. Wong (王国强)

Wu (Hao)-style tai chi
- Traditional Chinese: 武郝式太極拳
- Simplified Chinese: 武郝式太极拳
Transcriptions
Standard Mandarin
- Hanyu Pinyin: Wǔ Hǎo Shì Tàijíquán
- Wade–Giles: Wu^{3} Hao^{3} Shih^{4} T'ai^{4}-chi^{2} Ch'üan^{2}

Wu (Hao)-style tai chi (Chinese: 武(郝)式太极拳; pinyin: Wǔ (Hǎo) shì tàijíquán) is one of the five primary styles of tai chi. It was created in the mid-nineteenth century by Wu Yuxiang, a member of a wealthy and influential family in Yongnian, Hebei, China. Wu trained for approximately ten years with the founder of Yang-style tai chi, and then for over a month with a Chen-style master. Wu also obtained a manual on internal martial arts that formed the core of what are now known as the tai chi classics and include Wu's own writing on the subject. From these sources Wu and his family developed their own style, and may also have developed much of the cultural and intellectual foundation of tai chi as well.

Hao Weizhen was a disciple of Wu's nephew and was the first person outside the family to master their tai chi. Hao's contributions — in developing and spreading the art, and in training the founders of all subsequent Wu (Hao) lineages, as well as the further contributions of his son and grandson — are why many include his surname alongside or in place of Wu's when referring to this style.

This Wu style (武, Wǔ) is the third-oldest among the five major styles – Chen, Yang, Wu (Hao), Wu (吳, Wú), and Sun – but is the smallest and least well-known of the five, in part because Wu Yuxiang and his family had no need to teach professionally. It is best known for its small- and medium-frame forms, as well as its emphasis on the core tai chi concept of "open-close" or "kai he" (開合, 开合), and so is also known as Kai He tai chi (開合太極拳).

== History ==
=== Wu Yuxiang ===
Wu Yuxiang began training with Yang Luchan, the founder of Yang-style tai chi, in the early 1840s after Yang returned to Yongnian from his years in the Chen village. Among their many properties the Wu family were the landlords of Chen Dehu's pharmacy and clinic, where Yang offered instruction in what he then called "soft boxing" (軟拳), "cotton boxing" (棉拳), or "neutralizing boxing" (化拳). But in the early 1850s, Wu and his family introduced Yang as martial arts instructor to a prominent family in distant Beijing, where Yang was invited to take up a teaching position at the palace of Prince Duan.

Wu then found his way to Chen Qingping, a master of Chen-style (Note: Chen Qingping may have taught Chen small frame, but all we have in writing on that topic are assumptions made by early 20th-century historians extrapolating from their knowledge of the Hao family small frame; this was not actually recorded in any authenticated sources yet found.) and Zhaobao tai chi, in Zhaobao village where he trained with Chen for over one month (per writings left by Wu's nephew and grandson). After approximately ten years of training with Yang, Wu was likely able to quickly master a great deal from Chen, gaining further depth and insight.

From this training Wu began to develop his own style, which he shared with members of his extended family. He and his family were wealthy gentry, some of them government officials but none in military careers at that time, and had no need to teach martial arts for professional or financial purposes. They seem to have pursued tai chi primarily as a means of self-cultivation, and possibly for self-defense and leadership in a time of widespread civil breakdown and unrest including banditry, anti-landlord uprisings, and the Nian and Taiping rebellions.

=== The tai chi classics ===
In the early 1850s Wu's eldest brother Chengqing (武澄清, also known as Wu Qiuying, 武秋瀛; 1800-1884) was serving as a government official in Henan, when he obtained a manual on the principles of internal martial arts. In the writings of the next generation, this was tersely reported as having been received at "a salt shop", with the assumption that any reader would understand the context of that statement. Salt merchants were wealthy and of equal social status with an official like Wu Chengqing. At least one scholar speculates that the owner of that shop may have been a fellow book collector who had learned of the Wu family's interest in the topic, and was seeking to curry favor with Chengqing who among other things was in charge of tax collection.

Authorship of the manuscript was attributed to a Wang Zongyue of Shanxi, about whom no information is available in verifiable historical records. (Some have suggested Wang Zongyue could be a pseudonym of Wu Yuxiang or another Wu family member, but the writing style is different and the mundane salt shop story – as opposed to, say, claiming an immortal sage found it in an enchanted cave – lends believability as well.) Wu Chengqing passed the manual on to Wu Yuxiang, who discussed it with his friend and teacher Yang Luchan. Yang agreed it was important. Over the following years, Wu and his family applied the lessons of this text to the development of their art and created a body of written work around it, which together became known as the first version of the tai chi classics.

Wu's nephew and top disciple Li Yiyu (李亦畬; 1832–1892) contributed several texts to the final collection. Wu's older brothers Chengqing and Ruqing (武汝清; 1803-1887) also wrote on the topic after they retired from government service, though those works along with more by Li Yiyu were not made public until the 1980s and 1990s, so have been called "lost classics". Wu likely also shared his writings with Yang Luchan, and with Yang's son Yang Banhou, who Wu tutored (probably in literacy as well as tai chi). Although the Wu and Yang lineages appear to have drifted apart by the next generation, in the early twentieth century Yang Chengfu's disciples began to publish their own versions of these texts with their own additions, and began to call them the "tai chi classics".

==== The name of tai chi ====
The term "taijiquan" (the Chinese name of tai chi) may have first appeared in the Wu/Li family's mid-nineteenth century writings, perhaps drawn from the Wang Zongyue text which begins with the words "Taiji is born from Wuji; it is the mother of Yin and Yang". (Note: Original text: 太極者. 無極而生. 陰陽之母也.) As the Wu family had no need to promote their art, it was left to the Yangs to bring this to the public first. But with different priorities, especially as the two families drifted apart (or worse) by the second generation, they often felt no need to mention each other at all which is why few knew of this.

Yang family tradition tells us only that imperial court scholar Weng Tonghe used the term "taiji" (tai chi) in a poem to describe a performance by Yang Luchan. It is not clear if that was an additional influence on the name, or if the new name was already in use there, along with the earlier names "Thirteen Postures" (十三式), "Long Boxing"(長拳), (Note: "Long" (chang) as in "continuous, flowing, and strong like the Changjiang (Long River, Yangzi)"; not to be confused with the external martial art emphasizing long reach also known as Long Fist or Changquan.) and "Soft/Cotton/Neutralizing Boxing" (軟/棉/化拳). Written evidence that the Yang family had started using the name taiji for their martial art first appears in a later text, possibly completed in 1875 by Yang Luchan's son Yang Banhou (who had been tutored by Wu Yuxiang), or no later than the first decade of the twentieth century by one or more of Yang Banhou's disciples.

By the second decade of the twentieth century, Yang Chengfu's disciples and Sun Lutang were using the term "taijiquan" in their publications, including in the titles of some of the tai chi classics. It then appeared in a book by a Chen family member, Chen Xin, published after he died in 1929. This timeline may represent the origin and history of the adoption of this name — from Wu to Yang to Wu (吳), then Sun, then Chen — but with no record of verbal usage we have no way of knowing for sure.

==== The legend of Zhang Sanfeng ====
The Wu family wrote of many other connections between the art and traditional Chinese culture, with the writings of eldest brother Wu Chengqing especially showing his interest in Daoism when he was not occupied with his official Confucian responsibilities. Scholars believe Wu Yuxiang passed along to his successors and to the Yang family the story of the creation of internal martial arts by legendary Daoist alchemist Zhang Sanfeng.

For Wu Yuxiang and the seventeenth century authors he likely drew from, that story may have been primarily an anti-Manchu political allegory. There is no mention of Zhang in original Chen village documents, and although Wu's nephew and disciple Li Yiyu did write about Zhang, in a later piece written in 1881 Li stated "The creator of tai chi is unknown". (Note: Original text: 太極拳不知始自何人, also translated by Paul Brennan as "It is not known who Taiji Boxing came from.")

But with Wu Yuxiang most likely having planted the seeds of this tradition, supplementary chapters on internal martial arts attributed to Zhang were appended to the above-mentioned work by Yang Banhou or his disciples, and by the early twentieth century publications by Yang Chengfu's disciples and Sun Lutang proclaimed Zhang Sanfeng creator of tai chi itself. In Yang-style editions Zhang was also named as author of one of the tai chi classics.

=== Li Yiyu and Hao Weizhen ===
"Wu Yuxiang taught reading as a hobby, and Li Yiyu practiced medicine as a profession. They both considered themselves to be members of the literati, and in their hometown taught very few students. Li's best student was his neighbor, Hao He, known by the courtesy name Weizhen." —Gu Liuxin (Note: Original text: 禹襄教讀自娛，亦畬行醫為業，均以儒生自居，在鄉授徒極少。李所傳以同鄉郝和（字為真）的技術最精。)

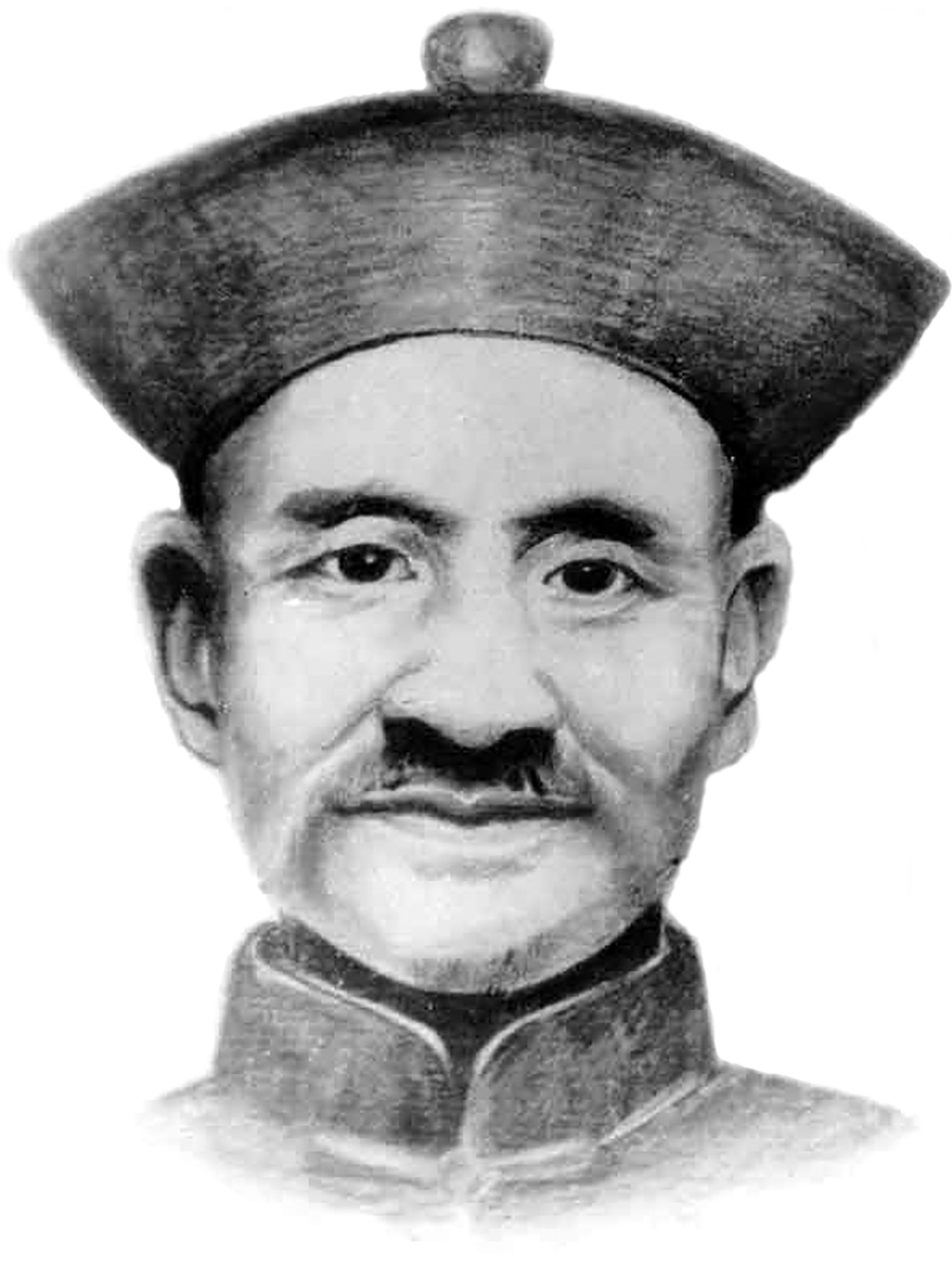
Li Yiyu (李亦畬, 1832–1892)

Wu Yuxiang practiced his tai chi with his older brothers, and his only disciples were his nephews Li Yiyu and Li Qixuan (李啟軒, Simplified Chinese 李启轩, 1835-1899). Li Yiyu became a prominent voice speaking to us from the past through his writing on tai chi, and he was the first to teach this style to anyone outside the family. Wealthy and occupied for many years with establishing and running a smallpox clinic, he devoted much of his spare time to practicing, researching, and further developing the art with his uncle Yuxiang and brother Qixuan, but also took on as a disciple his neighbor Hao Weizhen, for whom he made one of only three handwritten copies of the Wu/Li family tai chi manual.

Hao Weizhen became a well-known master and professional instructor, further refining the art and developing his own solo form (see the Characteristics section below). Closely associated with the martial arts community in Hebei, including Yang Zhaolin (楊兆林; 1884-1922) the eldest grandson of Yang Luchan, beginning in 1914 he also taught in Beijing where his students included Sun Lutang, the founder of Sun-style tai chi, and in Yongnian that same year Hao led the first tai chi program in a public middle/high school. Hao's contributions – in developing and spreading the art, and in training the founders of all subsequent Wu (Hao) lineages, as well as the further contributions of his son and grandson – are why many include his surname when referring to this style.

== Lineage ==
The Wu (Hao) lineage (传系) is represented today by at least a dozen branches (支系) with many smaller offshoots. The four largest branches are listed here, named for the purposes of this article as follows:

- Li family branch
- Hao family branch
- Li Shengduan branch
- Li Baoyu (Li Xiangyuan) branch

The founders of these branches trained under Hao Weizhen, but the first branch in the list traces lineage directly back to the original Wu and Li families. Li family descendants still teach, but no direct descendant of the Wu or Hao families has a leading role in the art today.

Although Sun style is considered a descendant (派生) of Wu (Hao) style because the founder learned tai chi from Hao Weizhen, that style is covered in a separate article and not included here.

(Article continues below lineage tree)

=== Lineage tree ===
Wu (Hao)-style tai chi lineage tree

Key:	NEIJIA
Solid lines	Direct teacher-student.
Dot lines	Partial influence /taught informally /limited time.	TAIJIQUAN
Dash lines	Individual(s) omitted.
Dash cross	Branch continues.	CHEN-STYLE	Zhaobao-style
(杨露禅); Yang Luchan; 1799–1872; YANG-STYLE	(陈清萍); Chen Qingping; 1795–1868; Chen Small Frame, Zhaobao Frame
(武禹襄); Wu Yuxiang; 1812–1880; WU (HAO)-STYLE	Zhaobao He-style
(李啟軒); Li Qixuan; 1835-1899; 2nd gen. Wu (Hao)	(李亦畬); Li Yiyu; 1832–1892; 2nd gen. Wu (Hao)
Li-style	(郝為真); Hao Weizhen; 1849–1920; 3rd gen. Wu (Hao)	(李逊之); Li Xunzhi; 1882–1944; 3rd gen. Wu (Hao)
WU-STYLE	(孙禄堂); Sun Lutang; 1861–1932; SUN-STYLE	(郝月如); Hao Yueru; 1877-1935; 4th gen. Wu (Hao)	李寶玉 (李香遠); Li Baoyu (Li Xiangyuan); 1888-1961; 4th gen. Wu (Hao)	李聖端; Li Shengduan; 1888-1948; 4th gen. Wu (Hao)	李錦藩; Li Jinfan; 4th gen. Wu (Hao)
(董英傑); Dong Yingjie; 1897–1961; 4th gen. Yang	(郝少如); Hao Shaoru; 1908-1983; 5th gen. Wu (Hao)
Wudang-style	(刘积顺); Liu Jishun; 1930-Present; 6th gen. Wu (Hao)	(李伟明); Li Weiming; 1944-Present; 6th gen. Wu (Hao)	浦公達; Pu Gongda; 1905-1997; 6th gen. Wu (Hao)
CHEN-STYLE	YANG-STYLE	WU-STYLE	SUN-STYLE	WU (HAO)-STYLE

Note:
- This lineage tree is not comprehensive, but depicts those considered the 'gate-keepers' & most recognised individuals in each generation of Wu (Hao)-style.
- Although many styles were passed down to respective descendants of the same family, the lineage focused on is that of the Wu (Hao) style & not necessarily that of the family.'

=== Li family branch ===
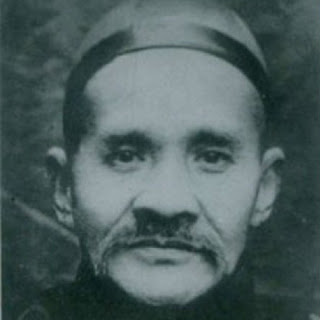
Li Xuzhi (李逊之, 1882–1944)

This branch uses the name "Wu-style tai chi" (武式太极拳), sometimes spelled "Wuu" in translation to indicate the pronunciation. Some have referred to it as "Li Frame" (李架) or "Northern Branch", and we discuss those names below, but members of this lineage do not use those labels themselves today. They also do not include the name Hao because their lineage includes family bonds to the original Li and Wu families, but Hao Weizhen did help train founder Li Xunzhi (李逊之, 1882–1944). Xunzhi was ten years old when his father Li Yiyu died, and so completed his training under his elder brothers and his elder "martial brother" Hao Weizhen.

Li Xunzhi's sons were key disciples, including Li Jinfan (Chinese: 李锦藩; 1920-1991), and the lineage continued on through his grandsons and other family members, but among his most well-known disciples were also Wei Peilin (魏佩林; 1913-1961) and Yao Jizu (Chinese: 姚继祖; 1917-1998).

Wei was rising to prominence with the National Sports Commission before he died while still in his forties. Yao led prominent tai chi organizations and schools, and published many books and articles, including 武氏太极拳全书 (The Complete Book of Wu Style Taijiquan), which covers this lineage's forms and other training practices. That serves as their core handbook, supplemented with books and articles by fifth generation grandmaster Zhai Weichuan (翟维传; 1942-) and others, including Zhai's book 武式太极拳37式 (Wu Style 37-Posture Taijiquan) on the simplified form he developed for busy beginners. This lineage has continued to develop shorter forms, including a 28-posture routine, consistent with trends and standards in the field. They generally practice in middle frame, with small frame training for advanced students.

Grandmaster Zhai was a disciple of Wei Peilin until Wei died, and then became a disciple of Yao Jizu. Zhai is currently the president of the Yongnian Yuxiang Taiji Research Institute (永年禹襄太極研究院), headquartered in Yongnian with branches in Hangzhou, Tianjin, Shijazhuang, and other places in China, and has taught in many more locations nationwide. His son Zhai Shizong (翟世宗) is managing director and a master instructor there.

In 1999 Zhai Weichuan founded a 1,000-student primary school centered around tai chi. Tens of thousands of adult tai chi students have also participated in his training programs, including groups from abroad, and he has accepted 140 formal disciples. In 2020 he appeared in the film submitted by China to place tai chi on the UNESCO Intangible Cultural Heritage List, representing the "Wuu" style.

Zhong Zhenshan (钟振山, 1949-), another fifth generation grandmaster, is perhaps better known in the West than most representatives of this lineage. Born in Yongnian, he became disciple of Yao Jizu at age 13. He has written over twenty articles on tai chi, and assisted Yao Jizu in compiling 武氏太极拳全书 (The Complete Book of Wu Style Taijiquan). With others of his lineage generation, he helped develop the Wu-style competition and simplified forms. Winner of several gold medals in tai chi contests, he was appointed general instructor for a thousand-person tai chi performance, and has been officially recognized for his accomplishments. He has trained many disciples and students in China, and has led workshops and advised Wu-style organizations in North America as well.

This lineage practices a 108-posture empty-hand form, as well as simplified and competition forms, sword and staff forms, push hands, and other aspects of the art. More about forms and partner work is in the Characteristics section.

=== Hao family branch ===
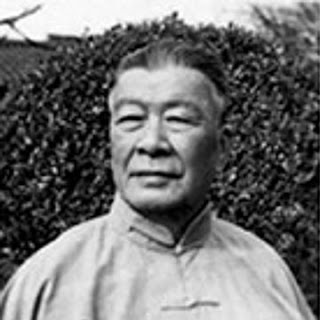
Hao Shaoru (郝少如, 1907-1983)

In the past this branch often used the name "Wu-style tai chi" (武式太極拳), with some attempts to clarify by calling it "Hao Frame" (郝架) or "Hao School" (郝派), resulting in longer locutions like "Wu Style Hao Family tai chi" (武氏郝家太极拳). But over time the trend has been to call it "Wu (Hao) tai chi" (武(郝)太極拳) or even simply "Hao Family tai chi" (郝氏太極拳). The branch was founded by Hao Weizhen's son Hao Yueru (郝月如; 1877-1935) and grandson Hao Shaoru (郝少如; 1907-1983), who brought the art from Yongnian to the Nanjing region and Shanghai in 1930, at a time when many martial artists followed the Chinese government and economy to those areas.

They also made changes to their art consistent with developments happening in many tai chi styles and other martial arts at the time, to bring the benefits of tai chi to a wider range of people. Building on the form created by his father Hao Weizhen, Hao Yueru developed a 96-posture small frame form and his son Hao Shaoru developed a shortened 49 posture version of the same form, both designed to be accessible to people who practice tai chi primarily for health, while still offering a martial core with lessons on internal power and other advanced aspects of the art to intermediate and advanced students. This lineage is known for their focus on the internal aspects of "yi" (意, "intention") and "qi" (氣, "energy") in martial applications.

Hao Shaoru paused his public tai chi teaching in the 1950s, but thanks to his friend Gu Liuxin he was invited by the government to lead a new class in Shanghai in 1960, and in 1963 published the seminal book Wu Style Taijiquan (武式太极拳) which focused on the 96-movement form. Liu Jishun (劉積順, Simplified 刘积顺, 1930-), also known as Jackson Liu, became the second student in that 1960 class. Also a master of tui na and other aspects of traditional Chinese medicine, Liu continued training with Hao Shaoru until Hao's death in 1983 (though they practiced separately for a few years during the Cultural Revolution), and in 1981 Liu was selected by Hao Shaoru to begin representing the lineage alongside top artists from other tai chi styles at events in Yongnian and elsewhere.

Grandmaster Liu trained a new generation of disciples and other students in China, serving as vice president and then president of the Shanghai Wu Style Taijiquan Research Association in the 1980s. He also accepted disciples from the United Kingdom, including the head of the British Jingwu Athletic Association, Jifu Huang (黄济复, 1935-1995), and two more UK disciples who have in turn trained several British national push hands champions and founded Hao-style schools in the UK and Singapore. In 1995 Liu moved to the United States, where he founded the Wu (Hao) Taiji Association of Silicon Valley and trained several disciples there. In 2005 he retired to the San Diego area, where he continued to teach tui na and tai chi, and in 2008 and 2012 two English/Chinese books on the Hao family style were issued under his name by a Hong Kong martial arts publisher.

Other Hao Shaoru disciples and students include Pu Gongda (浦公達/达; 1905-1997), a lifelong martial artist who began training with Hao Shaoru in the 1960s, established the Shanghai Wu Style Taijiquan Research Association with Hao in 1983 and served as president of the organization, and trained thousands of students including British and Americans; Hao's adopted son Li Weiming (李伟明, 1944-), also a master of tui na and traditional Chinese medicine, who began training with Hao Shaoru in 1961 and now teaches in Shanghai and Bangkok; and Hao's adopted son Hao Yinru (郝吟如, 1958-), who changed his name from Wang Muyin (王慕吟) and now teaches in Shanghai. In 1991 Hao Yinru wrote a new foreword to a new edition of Hao Shaoru's book, Wu Style Taijiquan (武式太极拳).

In addition to the 49- and 96-posture small frame forms, advanced students in this lineage also learn the old form of Hao Weizhen in small frame, as well as staff/pole training, straight sword, push hands, and other aspects of the art. More about forms in the Characteristics section.

=== Li Shengduan branch ===
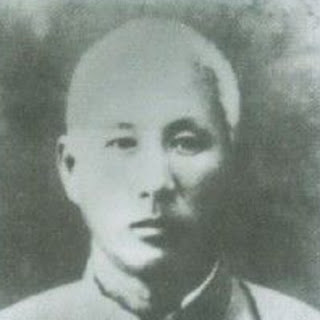
Li Shengduan (李聖端, Simplified Chinese 李圣端, 1888-1948)

This branch currently uses the name "Wu (Hao) tai chi" or "Wu Hao tai chi" (武郝太極拳). The founder, Li Shengduan (Chinese: 李圣端; 1888-1948), of Xingtai, Hebei, was a disciple of Hao Weizhen and was an accomplished scholar. Descended from China's Hui people, he was not related to Li Yiyu. His most prominent disciples were Ma Rong (马荣; 1912-1965), Chen Gu'an (陈固安; 1913-1993), and Wu Wenhan (吴文翰; 1928-2019).

A scholarly lineage from the start, Li's disciples authored many books and articles on tai chi and related subjects, in addition to training many disciples and students of their own. Chen Gu'an wrote a book on the 108-posture form he standardized for this lineage and another on the Wu (Hao) style staff. Wu Wenhan wrote a book on Wu (Hao)-style applications and edited a comprehensive collection of classic works on tai chi — from Li Yiyu's copy of the Wang Zongyue classic through major early twentieth century writers of all tai chi styles — as well as over 200 articles on the history and theory of the art.

Wu Wenhan also researched and released in 1993 previously unknown works by Wu Yuxang's eldest brother Wu Chengqing. Those texts, along with other "lost classics" by Li Yiyu, Wu Ruqing, and Yang Banhou first revealed to the public between 1985 and 1993, expanded our understanding of the original history and thought of the founding generations and the tai chi classics.

This lineage continues to thrive in China, and is represented worldwide by Texas-based Grandmaster Jimmy K. Wong (王國强, 王国强, Wang Guoqiang, Wong Kokkhang), a disciple of Chen Gu'an and Wu Wenhan. Their schools practice a small frame 108-posture long form standardized by Chen Gu'an plus several small frame simplified forms, as well as straight sword, saber, staff, and other aspects of the art. More about forms in the Characteristics section.

=== Li Baoyu (Li Xiangyuan) branch ===
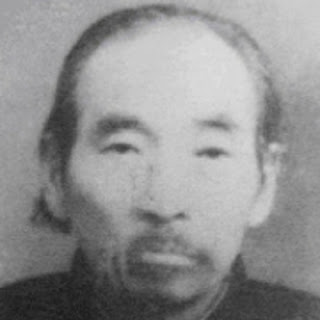
Li Baoyu (Chinese: 李宝玉, 1888–1961), also known by the courtesy name Li Xiangyuan (Chinese: 李香远)

Focused on the old form of Hao Weizhen, most masters in this lineage call their art "Hao-style tai chi" (郝式太极拳). The branch was founded by Li Baoyu (李宝玉; 1888-1961), who was also known by the courtesy name Li Xiangyuan (李香远). Li was a native of Shunde in what is now Xingtai, Hebei, and was not related to Li Yiyu. Beginning at age 14 he trained under Liu Yingzhou (劉瀛洲) in San Huang Pao Chui, and then as an adult studied Yang Banhou tai chi under Yang Luchan's eldest grandson Yang Zhaolin (楊兆林; 1884-1922), before mastering Wu (Hao)-style as a disciple of Hao Weizhen.

Small and slightly built, Li Baoyu surprised many challengers, defeating all opponents in and out of the ring including several gangsters. Thrust into a hardscrabble life at an early age, martial arts provided strength and stability, and his prowess earned him the nickname "Spirit Hand (神手) Li". He established a flour milling business and raised a family, but his many storied martial adventures continued on throughout his life. His most famous student was Dong Yingjie. He coached Dong through a nationally celebrated victory against a British boxer in Nanjing — as the story goes, Li was originally slated to fight that match, but a Chinese gangster working for the British consul temporarily blinded him by throwing lime powder in his eyes — and then taught in Suzhou, Hangzhou, Nanjing, Hebei, Shanxi, and elsewhere, his fame attracting requests for training even from the central government.

Known for his Vajra Palm (金刚掌), Tai Chi Yin Wind Palm (太极阴风掌) and Extend Peng Draw Lü Rotation (伸掤收捋旋转圈) techniques, he trained several disciples, including Shi Fengchun (石逢春), Li Wanquan (李万全), and his good friend the Daoist adept Li Jianxing (李见性) who was also a master of traditional Chinese medicine. Li Baoyu's daughter Li Guihua (李桂花), also a disciple, collaborated on a manual of their Hao style and on a novel about the heroic exploits of her father and his friends that includes the story of intrigue surrounding the famous match in Nanjing.

His disciples established teaching lineages in Hebei and Shanxi, and on the national stage his disciple Ouyang Fang (Chinese: 欧阳方) represented Wu (Hao)-style in an official 1977 government film of the major tai chi styles, performing the Hao Weizhen form. Li Baoyu's friend and student Dong Yingjie included that form, along with fast forms Dong developed in part by incorporating postures and principles he learned from Li, in the advanced curriculum of Dong family tai chi taught today in over twenty countries around the world. More about these forms is in the Characteristics section below.

=== The rectification of (branch) names ===
"When Wu-style tai chi spread to Beijing in the first years of the Republic, some people called it 'Li frame', then when Weizhen's son Yueru and grandson Shaoru went to teach in Nanjing and Shanghai in 1928, people also called it 'Hao frame'." - Gu Liuxin (Note: Original text: 武式太極拳於民國初傳入北京時，有些人把它稱作李架，待為真之子月如和其孫少如於1928間去南京、上海教拳時，也有人稱它為郝架。)

As the Hao family began to spread this style to the public, some confusion resulted. When Hao Weizhen traveled to Beijing in 1914 to teach his middle frame form, he humbly presented himself as a disciple of Li Yiyu. But in 1930 when his son and grandson moved to the Nanjing and Shanghai areas to teach their unique small frame forms, they were more forward about taking credit. And so the Wu-style form created by Hao Weizhen was sometimes called "Li frame" (李架), while the next-generation Wu-style forms created by his descendants were called "Hao frame" (郝架).

Some also attempted to clarify this by referring to the Li family lineage as the "Northern" branch, and schools of the Hao family beginning with Hao Yueru as the "Southern" branch, though for much of their lives they were all based in Hebei. The other lineages founded by the unrelated masters surnamed Li were also sometimes lumped together as "Northern".

Those terms are seldom used today. The Li family lineage has long since committed to using only the name "Wu-style", while the other branches began using variations such as "Wu Hao-style" and "Hao-style" more often over time, as described in the above sections on Lineage. The topic of Northern and Southern Chinese martial arts generally refers to a much broader geography and time frame than the early twentieth century context of Beijing vs. Nanjing/Shanghai, and in that wider context all styles of tai chi are considered "Northern".

== Characteristics ==
Wu Yuxiang's style is unlike Chen style, old or new frame, and unlike Yang style, large or small frame. After he learned those styles, he created a new system that offers these unique points: compact postures, slow relaxed movements, and footwork that strictly and clearly distinguishes empty and solid. Chest and belly are kept neutral in advancing, retreating, and turning, completely relying on the internal movement between empty and solid to transform and dominate external forces with "internal qi and hidden change". — Gu Liuxin (Note: Original text: 武禹襄拳式既不同於陳式老架和新架，亦不同於楊式大架和小架，學而化之，自成一派，其特點是：姿勢緊湊，動作舒緩，步法嚴格分清虛實，胸部、腹部的進退旋轉始終保持中正，完全是用內動的虛實轉換和"內氣潛轉"來支配外形)

=== Compact frame ===
Tai chi styles are often categorized by their "frame size", which describes how far the body is extended for small, medium, or large overall reach. Wu (Hao) is practiced primarily in small and middle frame. In describing small frame, Gu Liuxin wrote "the left and right hands each control half the body; they do not cross the center line, and they do not extend beyond the tips of the feet". (Note: Original text: 左右手各管半個身體，不相逾越，出手不過足尖。) Medium frame is, of course, midway between that and the fully extended large frame.

Wu (Hao) began as a middle frame style, and the Li family lineage continues to practice primarily in middle frame, though they also train advanced students in small frame as well.

The Hao family lineage is known for their small frame. Their forms and other practice focus on small frame movements, including the old form of Hao Weizhen which they modified for small frame practice.

The Li Shengduan lineage also focuses on small frame practice, while the Li Baoyu lineage teaches the old form of Hao Weizhen and advanced techniques in middle frame, though the Dong family branch has trended towards large frame over time.

=== Traditional and simplified forms ===
Wu (Hao)-style forms have undergone five stages of development since the nineteenth century, and since the third generation have often been called "kai he" (Chinese: 开合; lit. 'open and close') forms in reference to their focus on "opening and closing" movements.

First- and second-generation Forms

The earliest written records we have of this style's forms are in Li Yiyu's own hand. In 1881 he recorded a first-generation form consisting of 53 to 55 postures, the count varying as he worked to improve the description. He and his brother Li Qixuan continued working on improvements to the training for the rest of their lives, developing a second-generation 67-posture form. The larger total resulted from separately counting subpostures, such as left and right versions of the same posture, and some additional postures.

Among other core tai chi principles, opening and closing movements were emphasized in this style from the beginning, however in the first two generations' forms the postures named specifically for that concept were referred to not as "kai he", but with a literary term, "zhuan he" (Chinese: 转合; lit. 'turn and close'. Some have continued to use that older phrase; see the Comparisons section below for more detail on this topic).

Third generation: the Kai He form

Li Yiyu's top disciple Hao Weizhen created a form that is usually taught as a sequence of 81 to 88 postures. Hao was the first to use the term "kai he", or "opening and closing", in the names of specific movements in a form, drawing from Li Yiyu's writing on theory (discussed further below). As a result, this has often been called "the Kai He form" and at times the entire style has been called "Kai He tai chi" (開合太極拳).

This is the oldest Wu (Hao) form still widely practiced today. As performed in many schools it is still representative of the early forms with its upright middle frame and its clearly martial aspect. The sequence, in most of the posture names at least, is familiar to practitioners of Yang and other styles. In Wu (Hao) schools that no longer practice it regularly, its influence is visible to the trained eye in the fourth generation and Sun-style forms. However, some lineages or branches that still practice this form have modified certain aspects to align with their curriculums.

In 1914 when Hao Weizhen first taught in Beijing, this form was performed in about eight or nine minutes, the same speed at which Yang Chengfu and Wu Jianquan were timed doing their own long forms that decade in largely the same sequences we know today. All these forms were performed at a varying slow-swift tempo then, usually with jumps and fa jin. The 1977 film of Li Baoyu disciple Ouyang Fang's performance of this form is like a time capsule for us, with few if any changes from the original he'd begun learning almost fifty years before. In the early twentieth century, tai chi forms were still intended for martial artists who also spent long hours each day training on individual moves and their applications, often after years of experience in other martial arts.

Yang Chengfu and Wu Jianquan modified their primary training forms to a slow even speed, removing jumps and fa jin, to make the art more accessible for the health of the broader public with the encouragement of government officials. But Hao Weizhen's form retained speed, jumps, and fa jin for decades, because the next generations developed other forms to meet the new goals.

The Li Baoyu lineage has preserved this form relatively unchanged, as documented in the 1998 book 郝式太极拳 (Hao Style Taijiquan) written in collaboration with Li Baoyu's daughter Li Guihua. It is practiced with some minor variations among schools in Hebei and Shanxi, where it is taught at a steady training pace of about fourteen minutes and at the faster nine-minute pace as well. Only in the worldwide Dong family tai chi branch is the focus only on a slowed down and smoothed out pace.

Because this is the only Wu (Hao) form in the Dong family curriculum, they perform in about eighteen minutes or more with only a few optional fast movements, giving advanced students time to focus on the unique Wu (Hao)-style internal training it offers. The original slow-swift tempo is instead available in the Dong family fast forms, which include sections that incorporate techniques and principles Dong Yingjie learned from Li Baoyu.

In addition, as practiced by the Dong family branch the postures are slightly forward-inclined, in a larger frame, and with Dong Yingjie's signature "iron finger" hands. Internally, practitioners focus on bringing energy to the outside perimeter of the body in all directions, so that unlike the classic Yang-style metaphor of "an iron bar wrapped in cotton" this is more like "a crab shell on the outside, and soft inside". This remains a "soft-style" form with a focus on internal strength and structure, developed by cultivating "fullness" rather than stretching or external strength, but the Dong lineage call this their "hard form" to contrast it with their primary Yang-style "soft form". Their formal names for it remain "the Kai He form" and "the Hao form".

The Hao family lineage modified this form as well: they made it small frame, to align it with their next-generation forms. It retains vigorous features including speed, a jump kick, and some fa jin. It is taught to advanced students, and although Grandmaster Liu Jishun stated in a 1999 interview that it is taught at a fourteen-minute training pace, he also published a DVD in 2005 showing that once mastered it can still be performed in less than nine minutes or even under five minutes, in the classic slow-swift tempo.

Fourth generation: new traditional forms

In the first half of the twentieth century the forms got longer still, but with a change in focus: creating routines for the broader public and not just for martial artists.

The first was Hao Yueru's 96-movement small frame form. Gu Liuxin gave these examples of changes in that form: "Originally there were also jumping movements until the fourth generation teacher Hao Yueru (1877-1935) removed them. The 'Double-Slap Swinging Lotus' was also changed so that there is no slapping of the top of the foot. These were adaptations made for the needs of the old and infirm."

Accessible to "the old and infirm", yes, and Hao Shaoru did say it was a qigong quan (氣功拳), but it still contains a martial arts core, with lessons on the applications of internal strength and other topics for intermediate and advanced students. The Hao family lineage is known for their focus on yi (意; 'intention') as well as qi ("energy"), with masters demonstrating the use of their small and seemingly soft movements to launch opponents into the air and across the room just as well as masters of other lineages often do.

Next were two 108-movement routines. Like the Hao Yueru 96 form, these are now considered the traditional long forms of their respective lineages.

The Li family lineage (as we have named them for the purposes of this article), under Wei Peilin, Yao Jizu, and others, standardized a 108-posture form, in middle frame with no jump kicks or other immediately strenuous movements. Advanced students are introduced to fa jin movements and other aspects of internal strength in the form, and also learn to practice in small frame as well as a Pao Chui version with more fa jin.

In the Li Shengduan lineage, Chen Gu'an standardized another 108-movement form in a small frame approach that, as with the others of this generation, is accessible to a wider range of people yet contains martial training for intermediate and advanced students. This is the traditional long form taught today by Jimmy K. Wong and other disciples of that lineage, with a focus on internal strength and structure.

Fifth generation: simplified and competition forms

The era of shortened / simplified Wu (Hao) forms began in the mid-twentieth century with Hao Shaoru's 49-movement routine. Requiring only about 10 minutes to perform, as compared to approximately 25 minutes for the full 96-movement version, it is taught to beginners and used for public demonstrations.

Wu (Hao)-style masters were not included in the development of the 24-movement Simplified Form published in 1956, which was composed entirely of Yang-style postures, nor the 48-movement Combined Form of 1976 which included postures from Chen-, Yang-, Wu- (吳, Wú), and Sun-style and was later condensed into the 42-movement Competition Form in 1989.

But in 1995 a Wu (武, Wǔ)-style 46-movement Competition Form was finalized by a committee led by (as we have named them for the purposes of this article) the Li family lineage. That form was formally published and officially adopted by the national standards committee in 1996. Then in 2006 Zhai Weichuan of the same lineage published his 6-minute 37-movement simplified form to make tai chi available to a wider swath of the public. He and his disciples have since developed shorter forms, including a 28-posture routine, consistent with national trends and standards.

Meanwhile the Li Shengduan lineage, led abroad by Jimmy K. Wong, has developed simplified forms in 36, 32, 24, 13, and 8 movements. These are similar in length to new short forms developed by other styles at the behest of China's national standards committees.

Weapons forms and partner routines

Wu (Hao)-style weapons forms include, with some variation among the lineages and individual schools, straight sword (Chinese: 劍; pinyin: jiàn), saber/broadsword, and long pole (桿/杆, gǎn). Although spear methods (Chinese: 槍法; pinyin: qiāngfǎ) are mentioned in a 19th-century manual by Li Yiyu, they are seldom practiced today. However the pole forms and drills for one and two persons include many spear-like movements, similar to the sticking and thrusting pole practice of the Yang and Chen styles, but without the many rotations of Chen-style spear forms.

These forms share many other similarities with Yang-style weapons forms, and may be closely related. In some Hao family schools the straight sword form is almost exactly the same as the Yang-style version. In the Li family lineage, although their straight sword form is a different sequence, their two-person saber set is quite similar to a set practiced by some Yang-style branches and may be related via Yang Banhou. This is worthy of more research.

Partner work includes stationary and stepping push hands (推手, tuīshǒu), as well as two-person sparring routines and freestyle grappling (散打, sàndǎ). Wu Yuxiang and his family preferred moving over stationary partner practice. Further discussion of push hands theory is in the Comparisons section below. As mentioned above there are also two-person weapons sets for saber and staff.

=== The 13 Important Points ===
The tai chi classics of the Wu (Hao) style include a list of thirteen important points for every practitioner to keep in mind. Wu Yuxiang compiled the first eight, the "body methods" (身法, shēnfǎ), while Li Yiyu added the final five "essentials" (要領, Simplified 要领, yāolǐng). All Wu (Hao) lineages agree on the importance of this list for each and every movement, though some list them in a slightly different order. Following is a translation of the list as taught by Liu Jishun, grandmaster of the Hao family lineage.

1. Lift the head (提顶 / 堤頂 / tí dǐng)
2. Round the groin (吊裆 / 吊襠 / diào dāng)
3. Hollow the chest (涵胸 / 涵胸 / hán xiōng)
4. Extend the back (拔背 / 拔背 / bá bèi)
5. Protect the stomach (护肫 / 護肫 / hù zhūn)
6. Wrap the crotch (裹裆 / 裹襠 / guǒ dāng)
7. Loosen the shoulders (松肩 / 鬆肩 / sōng jiān)
8. Sink the elbows (沉肘 / 沉肘 / chén zhǒu)
9. Position the coccyx middlemost (尾闾正中 / 尾閭正中 / wěilǘ zhōngzhèng)
10. Sink the qi to the dantian (气沉丹田 / 氣沉丹田 / qì chén dāntián)
11. Clearly distinguish between empty and solid (分清虚实 / 分清虛實 / fēnqīng xūshí)
12. Always be prepared to move (腾挪 / 騰挪 / téngnuó)
13. Always attack in a flash (闪战 / 閃戰 / shǎnzhàn)

=== Comparisons: Chen and Yang (and the origin of Kai He) ===
Wu (Hao)-style tai chi is based on principles shared with other styles, especially Yang style. For example, Yang Chengfu's "Ten Essential Points" are quite similar to the Wu (Hao)-style "Thirteen Important Points" listed above, and in fact Wu Yuxiang has been named as the source of the Yang essential points list by some writers in the Yang-style lineage. Chen-style masters also teach these essentials with a few additional points, most notably the concept of internal spiral energy paths.

Like Yang-style, Wu (Hao)-style focuses on "pulling silk" (抽絲勁, 抽丝劲, chōusījìn) rather than the Chen-style "reeling silk" (纏絲勁, 缠丝劲, chánsījìn), and Wu (Hao) shares with Yang the focus on "sinking qi to the dantian" (氣沉丹田, 气沉丹田) rather than the Chen emphasis on dantian rotation (丹田運轉, 丹田运转). But all tai chi styles contain all of these principles, varied only by emphasis.

Other points of comparison include the many posture names and sequences in the empty-hand forms that are shared with Yang style and a few with Chen style, and the similarities with Yang-style weapons forms noted above, as well as similarities and differences on fundamental principles such as the Wu (Hao) style's focus on shifting and sinking vs. the Yang style's focus on shifting and twisting, though both styles contain all of those internal principles, just as all styles require the practitioner to clearly distinguish between "empty and solid" (虛實, 虚实, xūshí) weighting during those movements.

Shared principles aside, much of the Wu (Hao) approach is evidence of an independent evolution and can provide a new perspective for students of other styles. For example, in their forms where Yang stylists perform their signature moves of Commencing (qǐshì, 起勢, 起势) and Stroke Peacock's Tail's (攬雀尾, 揽雀尾) "péng lǚ jǐ àn" (掤捋擠/挤按), the Wu (Hao) forms instead perform Commencing and Lazily Bind the Cloak (lǎn zā yī, 懶紮衣, 懒扎衣). In name that would seem to derive from the Chen style, but in this style that sequence is different from both Yang and Chen, with a unique approach to internal alignment.

Beginning with Hao Weizhen, the internals of those movements have been named as:

- qǐ (起) — "Commencing", from wuji to taiji
- chéng (承) — "Connecting", from taiji to yin yang
- kāi (開, 开) — "Opening", as in "to expand" and "deliver" (擴展發放, 扩展发放) in attacking or retreating
- hé (合) — "Closing", as in "to gather" (收攏, 收拢) in completion of attacking or retreating,

and these can also be applied to every posture in the form.

Furthermore, Yao Jizu taught that all tai chi movements contain these principles:

- kāi (開, 开) — "Opening"
- hé (合) — "Closing"
- yǐn (隱, 隐) — "Hiding"
- xiàn (現, 现) — "Revealing"

This is not to say that Wu (Hao)-style masters haven't from the beginning also taught the four directions "péng lǚ jǐ àn" and the four corners "cǎi liè zhǒu kào" (採/采挒肘靠), at least in the context of pushing hands, as they have for example in the Pushing Hands Ditty (打手歌) transmitted by Li Yiyu, and in Wu Chengqing's recommendation to begin partner training with péng, lōu (摟/搂), and zhǒu (the Wu family's alternate terms for the same moves), as well as Hao Weizhen's mention of pushing hands in his advice to Sun Lutang, through more recent works such as Yao Jizu's chapter on pushing hands which shows the continued importance of the four directions and four corners by beginning with a basic push hands set in the pattern of "péng, lōu, zhǒu, àn".

Yet for Wu (Hao) stylists, the most fundamental concept is "kai he". Other styles of tai chi and other internal martial arts also give attention to the importance of opening and closing in all movements, but Li Yiyu was the first to specifically call it kai he in his "Treatise on the Diagram of Substantial/Insubstantial and Opening/Closing", (Note: Original text: 論虛實開合圖, 论虚实开合图) and Wu (Hao) masters have uniquely made this concept their central focus.

It took some time for Li's terminology to be adopted, however. The first two generations both called the internal aspects of Commencing and Lazily Bind the Cloak by the terms "qǐ chéng zhuǎn hé", with "zhuǎn" (轉, 转) meaning "to turn", "to change direction", or "to circle about". This is evidence of the origins of Wu (Hao) style with a family of the literati social class, as "qǐ chéng zhuǎn hé" is also the structure of classical Chinese essays required for the imperial examinations, as well as classical poetry. In modern times it has spread across East Asia as the structure of narratives such as screenplays, and is known in Japanese as "Kishōtenketsu" (起承転結).

But when Li Yiyu's student Hao Weizhen began spreading the art to the broader public, he refined his teaching for practical application by replacing "zhuǎn" with "kāi". Since then most masters have used the term "kai he", and in fact at times the entire style has been called "Kai He tai chi". However others, including Wu Wenhan of the Li Shengduan lineage, preserved the old terms in their teachings.

The unique focus on "zhuan he" / "kai he" in Wu (Hao) practice sets reveals their origin with the Wu/Li family of gentry scholars who cultivated this art among themselves while leading their community through difficult times, and is also a central example of the important contributions of Hao Weizhen.

== Bibliography ==
- Chen, Gu'an (陈固安, 1985), 太极棍 (Taiji Staff), 河南科学技术出版社 (Henan Science and Technology Publishing House), ISBN 978-7-50800-7601
- Chen, Gu'an (陈固安, 1988), 武式太极拳新架 (Wu Style Taijiquan New Frame), 河南科学技术出版社, (Henan Science and Technology Publishing House), ISBN 7-5349-0129-4
- Davis, Barbara (2004), The Taijiquan Classics, Blue Snake Books, ISBN 978-1-55643-431-0
- Dong, Alex & Saltman, David (2017), Grand Master, Hudson River, ISBN 978-0-9985329-0-5
- Du, Yimin (杜宜民, 1988), (太极阴风掌 (Taiji Yin Wind Palm), (花山文艺出版社 (Huashan Literature and Art Publishing House), ISBN 7805050643
- Hao, Shaoru, with 1963 introduction by Gu Liuxin (郝少如, 编者; 顾留馨, 简介; 1963, reprinted 1984, Simplified character edition), (武式太极拳 (Wu Style Taijiquan), (人民体育出版社 (People's Sports Publishing), UBC (PRC Unified Book Number) 7015•1190, OCLC 953122811, 1097666594
- Hao, Shaoru, with 1991 introduction by Hao Yinru (郝少如, 编者; 郝吟如, 1991 简介; Simplified character edition, 1999), 武式太极拳 (Wu Style Taijiquan), 人民体育出版社 (People's Sports Publishing), ISBN 9787500907565; (郝少如, 編者; 郝吟如, 1991 簡介; (Traditional character edition, 2006), 武式太極拳 (Wu Style Taijiquan), 大展出版社有限公司 (Dah Jaan Publishing Inc.), ISBN 957557477X
- Kirkpatrick, Andy, and Xu, Zhichang (2012), Chinese Rhetoric and Writing: An Introduction for Language Teachers, The WAC Clearinghouse; Parlor Press, PDF ISBN 978-0-97270-239-3 | ePub ISBN 978-0-97270-230-0 | Paperback ISBN 978-1-60235-300-8
- Li, Jianqing, Editor in Chief (李剑青, 主編, 2006), 永年太极拳志 (Yongnian Taijiquan Gazetteer), 人民体育出版社出版 (People's Sports Publishing House), ISBN 7-5009-3044-5.
- Li, Yiyu (李亦畬, 1881), 郝和珍藏 ("For Hao Weizhen to Cherish"), available online at Scribd and available in print in the 2016 Li Yiyu publication cited below.
- Li Yiyu (李亦畬, 2016), 王宗岳太极拳论 ("Wang Zongyue Taijiquan Treatise"), Beijing, 北京科学技术出版社 (Beijing Science and Technology Press), ISBN 9787530481684
- Liu, Jishun (劉積順, 2005) DVD, Wu (Hao) Tai Chi #1, DHM Productions
- Liu, Jishun (劉積順, 2005) DVD, Wu (Hao) Tai Chi #2, DHM Productions
- Liu, Jishun (劉積順, 2008), Hao Style Tai Ji Quan (Chinese/English), 郝氏太極拳真傳 (中英对照), Tin Wo Press & Publishing Co., Ltd., ISBN 9789881717276
- Liu, Jishun (劉積順, 2012), Secret Contents of Hao Weizhen Yi Qi Tai Ji Quan – Fundamental Skills (Chinese/English), 秘传郝为真意气太极拳基础功法, Tin Wo Press & Publishing Co., Ltd., ISBN 9789881797681
- Smalheiser, Marvin, "A Little History on Hao Style", T'ai Chi, June 1985, Vol. 9, No. 3. Wayfarer Publications. ISSN 0730-1049
- Smalheiser, Marvin, (with Li, Pranda, trans.), "Liu Jishun: Wu/Hao Style Internal Methods", Tai Chi, June 1999, Vol. 23, No. 3. Wayfarer Publications. ISSN 0730-1049
- Smalheiser, Marvin, (with Peng, Youlian, trans.), "Wu Wenhan on Exploring Tai Chi History", Tai Chi, Winter/December 2009, Vol. 33, No. 4. Wayfarer Publications. ISSN 0730-1049
- Sun, Lutang (孫祿堂, 1921), 太極拳學 (A Study of Taiji Boxing), available online in Chinese with English translation on Scribd, and in print (Traditional Chinese, 2018) from 大展出版社有限公司 (Dah Jaan Publishing Inc.), ISBN 978-986-346-201-9 and (Simplified Chinese, 2016), in 孙禄堂武学集注 太极拳学 ("Sun Lutang Martial Theory Collection: A Study of Taiji Boxing"), Beijing, from 北京科学技术出版社 (Beijing Science and Technology Press), ISBN 9787530486252
- Sun, Lutang (孫祿堂, 1924), 拳意述真 (Authentic Explanations of Martial Concepts), available online in Chinese with English translation on Scribd and in print (Traditional Chinese 2018) from 大展出版社有限公司 (Dah Jaan Publishing Inc.), ISBN 978-986-346-218-7, and (Simplified Chinese, 2016), 孙禄堂武学集注 拳意述真 ("Sun Lutang Martial Theory Collection: Authentic Explanations of Martial Concepts"), Beijing, 北京科学技术出版社 (Beijing Science and Technology Press), ISBN 9787530486276
- Wile, Douglas (1983), T'ai-chi Touchstones: Yang Family Secret Transmissions, Sweet Ch'i Press, ISBN 978-0912059013
- Wile, Douglas (1996), Lost T'ai-chi Classics from the Late Ch'ing Dynasty, State University of New York Press, ISBN 0-7914-2653-X
- Wu, Liuqun (吴六群, 1998), 郝式太极拳 (Hao Style Taijiquan), 河北科学技术出版社 (Hebei Science and Technology Press), ISBN 9787537519878
- Wu, Ta-yeh (1993), The Internal Training of Taijiquan, Palo Alto, CA. TTOPA.
- Wu, Wenhan (吴文翰, 2001), 武派太极拳体用全书 (Wu Style Taijiquan Applications), 北京体育大学出版社 (Beijing Sports University Press), ISBN 7-81051-494-6
- Wu, Wenhan (吴文翰, 2009, 太极拳书目考 (Taijiquan Research Library), 人民体育出版社 (People's Sports Publishing House), ISBN 978-7-5009-3700-5
- Yao, Jizu (姚继祖, Simplified character edition, 1999), 武氏太极拳全书 (The Complete Book of Wu Style Taijiquan), 山西科学技术出版社 (Shanxi Science and Technology Publishing), ISBN 9787537714556; (姚繼祖, (Traditional character edition, 2010), 武氏太極拳全書 (The Complete Book of Wu Style Taijiquan), 大展出版社有限公司 (Dah Jaan Publishing Inc.), ISBN 9789574687497
- Yan, Hanxiu (严翰秀, Simplified character edition, 1996), 太极拳奇人奇功 (Taijiquan Persons of Extraordinary Talent and Achievement), 人民体育出版社 (People's Sports Publishing), ISBN 9787500913009; (嚴翰秀, (Traditional character edition, 2001), 太極拳奇人奇功 (Taijiquan Persons of Extraordinary Talent and Achievement), 大展出版社有限公司 (Dah Jaan Publishing Inc.), ISBN 9789574680719
- Yang, Banhou (楊班侯, 1875*), 太極法說 (Explaining Taiji Principles), available online in Chinese and English translation at Scribd and also included in Chinese and English translation in Wile, Douglas (1996), Lost T'ai-chi Classics from the Late Ch'ing Dynasty, State University of New York Press, ISBN 0-7914-2653-X (*Scholars estimate the publication date to be between 1875 and 1910, and believe the author(s) to be Yang Banhou and/or his disciples)
- Yu, Gongbao (余功保, 2006), 中国太极拳辞典 (China Taijiquan Dictionary), 人民体育出版社 (People's Sports Publishing House), ISBN 978-7-5009-2879-9
- Yu, Gongbao (余功保, 2013), 董家太极: 董英杰太极拳传承与精义 (Dong Family Taiji: Dong Yingjie Taijiquan Tradition and Essentials), 当代中国出版社 (Contemporary China Publishing House), ISBN 978-7-5154-0180-5
- Zhai, Weichuan (翟维传, Simplified character edition, 2006), 武式太极拳37式 (Wu Style Taijiquan 37 Form), 山西科学技术出版社 (Shanxi Science and Technology Press), ISBN 7-5377-2674-4; (Traditional character edition, 2014) 武式太極拳37式, 大展出版社有限公司 (Dah Jaan Publishing Inc.), ISBN 978-986-346-029-9
- Zhai, Weichuan (翟维传, Simplified character edition, 2006), 武式太极拳小架 (Wu Style Taijiquan Small Frame), 山西科学技术出版社 (Shanxi Science and Technology Press), ISBN 7-5377-2676-0; (Traditional character edition, 2015) 武式太極拳小架, 大展出版社有限公司 (Dah Jaan Publishing Inc.), ISBN 978-986-346-062-6
- Zhai, Weichuan (翟维传, Simplified character edition, 2006), 武式太极拳老架 (Wu Style Taijiquan Old Frame), 山西科学技术出版社 (Shanxi Science and Technology Press), ISBN 978-753-772-675-7; (Traditional character edition, 2015) 武式太極拳老架, 大展出版社有限公司 (Dah Jaan Publishing Inc.), ISBN 978-986-346-058-9
- Zhai, Weichuan (翟维传, 2006), 武式太极拳竞赛套路, (Wu Style Taijiquan Competition Form), 山西科学技术出版社 (Shanxi Science and Technology Press), ISBN 9787537726771
- Zhang, Shan (张山, 2014), 武式太极拳竞赛套路, 第二版, The Competition Routine of Wu Style Taijiquan, Second Edition (English and Chinese edition), Shanxi Science and Technology Press, ISBN 978-7537747431
- Zhou, Lishang (October 2007). "Wu Wenhan on Wu Yuxiang's Wu Style, part 1 of 2". T'ai Chi. Vol. 31, no. 5. Wayfarer Publications. ISSN 0730-1049.
- Zhou, Lishang (December 2007). "Wu Wenhan on the Wu Style of Wu Yuxiang, part 2 of 2". T'ai Chi. Vol. 31, no. 6. Wayfarer Publications. ISSN 0730-1049.
