= Tai chi classics =

Collection of martial art articles

The tai chi classics (Chinese: 太极拳谱; pinyin: tàijíquán pǔ or 太極拳經; tàijíquán jīng) are a collection of more than 100 articles on the Chinese martial art of tai chi written by the art's master practitioners over the centuries. They cover everything from the underlying taiji philosophical principles, to methods of practice and application. Previously passed down in secret from generation to generation in whole or in parts through various lineages, they achieved classical status as they became public starting in the mid-1930s. Together they now serve as the single authoritative guide for the development and usage of tai chi skills. Written mostly in classical Chinese, they are used today mostly by the serious martial art practitioners of modern 6 Lineages that all trace their lineages to the ancient style taught by the Chen family and Yang family starting in the mid-19th century.

While great antiquity is usually claimed for texts by legendary authors, modern scholarship has not been able to date any of them earlier than the late 19th century.

== Writings accorded Classic status ==
1. Tai Chi Classic (太極拳經; Tàijíquán Jīng) attributed to the legendary founder of tai chi, Zhang Sanfeng, claimed to be ca. 12th-14th century.
2. Salt Shop Manual (鹽店譜; Yándiàn Pǔ) containing the "Tai Chi Treatise" (太極拳論; Tàijíquán Lùn) attributed to the legendary Wang Zongyue. The text was said to have been found stored in the back room of a Beijing salt shop by Wu Yuxiang's brother Wu Chengqing.
3. Miscellaneous texts: Song of Thirteen Postures, Mental Elucidation of the Practise of Tai Chi and the Song of Sparring handed down in the Yang and Wu families.
4. Texts by Wu Yuxiang, a central figure in Wu (Hao)-style tai chi, and his nephew Li Yiyu (李亦畬; 1832–1892).
5. Forty Chapters of writings, with the last three chapters directly attributed to Zhang Sanfeng, preserved in the Yang and Wu families.
6. Tai Chi Illustrated (太極拳圖說; Tàijíquán Túshuō) published in 1919 by Chen Xin (陳鑫; 1849–1929) an important Chen family scholar.
7. The Study of Tai Chi (太極拳學; Tàijíquán Xué) first published in 1924 by Sun Lutang, the founder of his eponymous style of tai chi.
8. Yang Chengfu (1883-1936) published his Complete Principles and Applications of Tai Chi in 1934, a work considered authoritative in schools influenced by his many students and progeny. The book includes the well known "Ten Essential Points of Tai Chi Theory" authored by Yang.
9. Wu Kung-tsao (Wu Gongzao; 1902–1983) provided original texts and commentary on the previously mentioned Forty Chapters in Wu Family T'ai Chi Ch'uan. Wu's grandfather Wu Quanyou had inherited the Forty Chapters from Yang Banhou. The book was first published in Changsha in 1935. In 1980, when the book was published again in Hong Kong, the famous wuxia author Jin Yong contributed a postscript to Wu Kung-tsao's text in which Jin described influences from as far back as Laozi and Zhuang Zhou on contemporary Chinese martial arts.

== Collections, translations, and studies ==
- Liang, T. T., T'ai Chi Ch'uan for Health and Self-Defense:Philosophy and Practice (New York: Vintage, 1977)
- Lo, Benjamin; Inn, Martin; Amacker, Robert; Foe, Susan - The Essence of T'ai Chi Ch'uan: The Literary Tradition (Berkeley: North Atlantic, 1979 ISBN 0913028630)
- Jou, Tsung-hwa, The Tao of T'ai Chi Ch'uan (Rutland: Tuttle, 1980)
- Wile, Doug, Tai Chi Touchstones: Yang Family Secret Transmissions (Sweet Ch'i Press, 1983)
- Wile, Doug, Lost T'ai-chi Classics from the Late Ch'ing Dynasty (Albany: SUNY, 1996)
- Davis, Barbara, The Taijiquan Classics: An Annotated Translation (Berkeley: North Atlantic, 2004)
- Xin, Chen, The Illustrated Canon of Chen Family Taijiquan (Xi'an: INBI Matrix, 2007)
- Yun, Zhang; Ho, David, The Taijiquan Classics: The Essential Translation and Explanation with Commentary on History and Culture (Lulu, 2016 ISBN 978-0-578-17886-8)
