= Hao Weizhen =

Chinese martial artist

Hao Weizhen 郝為真
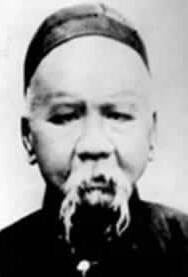
- Undated photo of Hao Weizhen
- Born: 1842; China
- Died: 1920 (aged 77–78)
- Nationality: Chinese
- Style: Wu (Hao)-style tai chi

Other information
- Notable students: Sun Lutang

Hao Weizhen
- Chinese: 郝為真
Transcriptions
Standard Mandarin
- Hanyu Pinyin: Hǎo Wéizhēn
- Wade–Giles: Hao Wei-chen

Hao Weizhen (1842–1920) was a Chinese tai chi teacher. Hao became a well known and influential teacher of Wu Yuxiang's style of tai chi, his teacher Li Yiyou was Wu Yuxiang's nephew. Hao passed the art of Wu Yuxiang's style of tai chi to his son and grandson, who became respected teachers in their own right, so that the style is sometimes now known as Wu (Hao)-style. One of Hao's most famous students was Sun Lutang.

== Tai chi lineage tree with Wu (Hao)-style focus ==
Wu (Hao)-style tai chi lineage tree

Key:	NEIJIA
Solid lines	Direct teacher-student.
Dot lines	Partial influence /taught informally /limited time.	TAIJIQUAN
Dash lines	Individual(s) omitted.
Dash cross	Branch continues.	CHEN-STYLE	Zhaobao-style
(杨露禅); Yang Luchan; 1799–1872; YANG-STYLE	(陈清萍); Chen Qingping; 1795–1868; Chen Small Frame, Zhaobao Frame
(武禹襄); Wu Yuxiang; 1812–1880; WU (HAO)-STYLE	Zhaobao He-style
(李啟軒); Li Qixuan; 1835-1899; 2nd gen. Wu (Hao)	(李亦畬); Li Yiyu; 1832–1892; 2nd gen. Wu (Hao)
Li-style	(郝為真); Hao Weizhen; 1849–1920; 3rd gen. Wu (Hao)	(李逊之); Li Xunzhi; 1882–1944; 3rd gen. Wu (Hao)
WU-STYLE	(孙禄堂); Sun Lutang; 1861–1932; SUN-STYLE	(郝月如); Hao Yueru; 1877-1935; 4th gen. Wu (Hao)	李寶玉 (李香遠); Li Baoyu (Li Xiangyuan); 1888-1961; 4th gen. Wu (Hao)	李聖端; Li Shengduan; 1888-1948; 4th gen. Wu (Hao)	李錦藩; Li Jinfan; 4th gen. Wu (Hao)
(董英傑); Dong Yingjie; 1897–1961; 4th gen. Yang	(郝少如); Hao Shaoru; 1908-1983; 5th gen. Wu (Hao)
Wudang-style	(刘积顺); Liu Jishun; 1930-Present; 6th gen. Wu (Hao)	(李伟明); Li Weiming; 1944-Present; 6th gen. Wu (Hao)	浦公達; Pu Gongda; 1905-1997; 6th gen. Wu (Hao)
CHEN-STYLE	YANG-STYLE	WU-STYLE	SUN-STYLE	WU (HAO)-STYLE

Note:
- This lineage tree is not comprehensive, but depicts those considered the 'gate-keepers' & most recognised individuals in each generation of Wu (Hao)-style.
- Although many styles were passed down to respective descendants of the same family, the lineage focused on is that of the Wu (Hao) style & not necessarily that of the family.'
