= Sun Lutang =

Chinese martial artist

Sun Lutang 孫祿堂
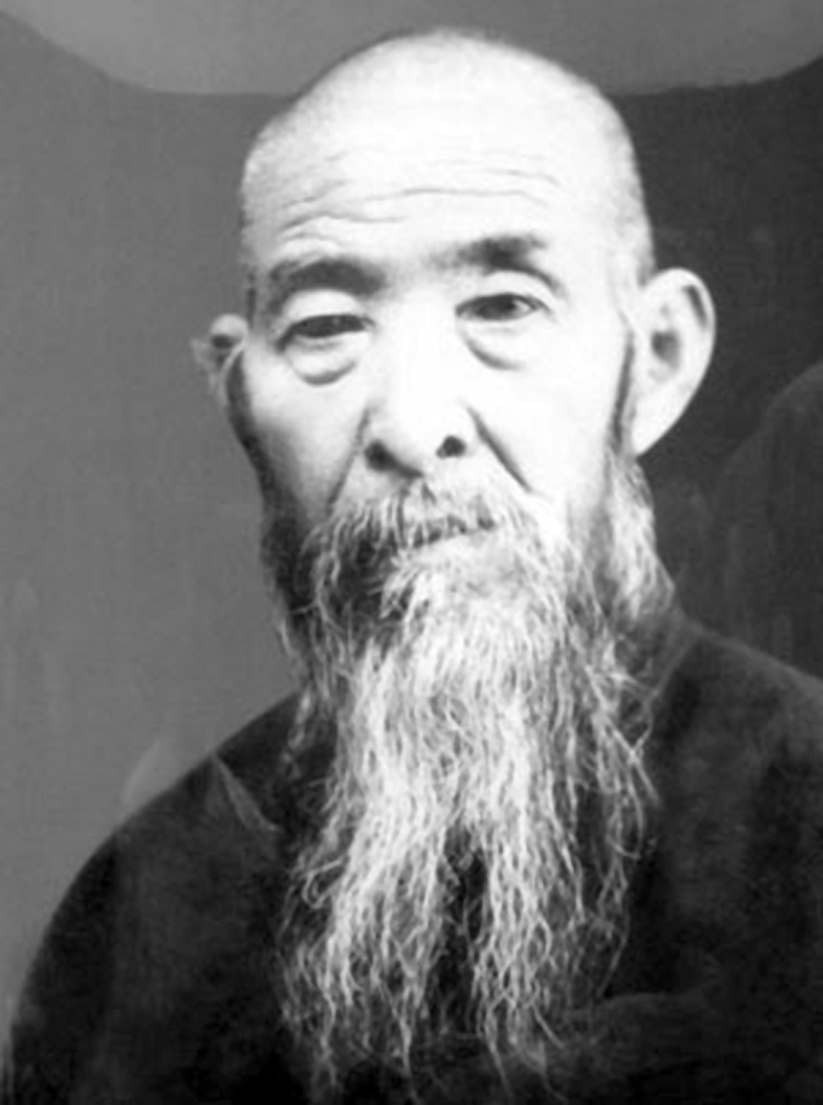
- Portrait of the Chinese, neijia martial arts master Sun Lutang
- Born: Sun Fuquan (孫福全); 1860; Hebei, China
- Died: 1933 (aged 72–73)
- Nationality: Chinese
- Style: Sun-style tai chi, Baguazhang; Xingyiquan
- Teachers: Xingyiquan: Li Kuiyuan (李魁元), later Guo Yunshen (from 1882) baguazhang: Cheng Tinghua (from 1891); Wu (Hao)-style tai chi: Hao Weizhen (from 1911)
- Rank: Founder of Sun-style tai chi Founder of Sun-style baguazhang Founder of Sun-style xingyiquan

Other information
- Website: Sun-style website

Sun Lutang
- Traditional Chinese: 孫祿堂
- Simplified Chinese: 孙禄堂
Transcriptions
Standard Mandarin
- Hanyu Pinyin: Sūn Lùtáng
- Wade–Giles: Sun Lu-t'ang

Sun Fuquan
- Chinese: 孫福全
Transcriptions
Standard Mandarin
- Hanyu Pinyin: Sūn Fúquán

Sun Lutang (1860-1933) was a master of Chinese neijia (internal) martial arts and was the progenitor of the syncretic art of Sun-style tai chi. He was also considered an accomplished Neo-Confucian and Taoist scholar (especially of the I Ching), and was a distinguished contributor to the theory of internal martial arts through his many published works.

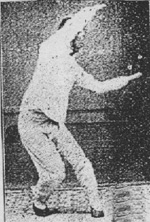
Sun Lutang performing baguazhang.

== Biography ==
He was born in Hebei and was named Sun Fuquan (孫福全) by his parents. Years later, his baguazhang teacher Cheng Tinghua gave him the name Sun Lutang. (It was common in old China for people to have multiple names, through various phases of life). He continued to use his original name in some areas, including the publishing of his books.

He was also well-versed in two other internal martial arts: xingyiquan and baguazhang before he came to study tai chi. His expertise in these two martial arts were so high that many regarded him as without equal. Sun learned Wu (Hao)-style tai chi from Hao Weizhen. Sun started studying with Hao relatively late in his life, but his accomplishments in the other two internal arts led him to develop his tai chi abilities to a high standard more quickly than is usual.

He subsequently was invited by Yang Shaohou, Yang Chengfu and Wu Jianquan to join them on the faculty of the Beijing Physical Education Research Institute where they taught tai chi to the public after 1914. Sun taught there until 1928, a seminal period in the development of modern Yang, Wu and Sun-style tai chi.

== Family ==
In 1891 he married Zhang Zhouxian, with whom he had three sons and a daughter.

- First son, Sun Xingyi (孫星一; 1891-1929)
- Second son, Sun Cunzhou (孫存周; 1893-1963)
- Third son, Sun Wuzi (孫务滋; 1897-1922)
- Daughter, Sun Jianyun (孫劍雲; 1913-2003)

== Teachers ==
- Xingyiquan from Li Kuiyuan (李奎垣), and later from Guo Yunshen (from 1882).
- Baguazhang from Cheng Tinghua (from 1891).
- Wu (Hao)-style tai chi from Hao Weizhen (from 1911).

== Tai chi lineage tree with Sun-style focus ==
Note:

- This lineage tree is not comprehensive, but depicts those considered the 'gate-keepers' & most recognised individuals in each generation of Sun-style.
- Although many styles were passed down to respective descendants of the same family, the lineage focused on is that of the Sun style & not necessarily that of the family.

Key:	NEIJIA
Solid lines	Direct teacher-student.
Dot lines	Partial influence /taught informally /limited time.	TAIJIQUAN
Dash lines	Individual(s) omitted.
Dash cross	Branch continues.	CHEN-STYLE	Zhaobao-style
YANG-STYLE
WU (HAO)-STYLE	Zhaobao He-style
Li-style	(郝為真); Hao Weizhen; 1849–1920; 3rd gen. Wu (Hao)
WU-STYLE	(孙禄堂); Sun Lutang; 1861–1932; SUN-STYLE
(孙存周); Sun Cunzhou; 1893–1963; 2nd gen. Sun	(孙剑云); Sun Jianyun; 1913–2003; 2nd gen. Sun
Wudang-style	(孙婉容); Sun Wanrong; 1927–Present; 3rd gen. Sun
CHEN-STYLE	YANG-STYLE	WU-STYLE	SUN-STYLE	WU (HAO)-STYLE

== Publications ==
In later life, he published five martial arts texts which were also later translated to English recently:

- Xingyiquan xue (A study of form mind boxing) 1915
- Baguaquan xue (A study of eight trigrams boxing) 1916
- Taijiquan xue (A study of grand ultimate boxing) 1921
- Baguajian xue (A study of eight trigrams straight sword) 1927
- Quanyi Shuzhen (An explanation of the essence of boxing)

He also wrote a study of bagua spear, though this was never published.
