= Tai chi =

Chinese martial art

Tai chi 太極拳
- The lower dantian in tai chi: Taijitu (yin and yang) rotate, while the core reverts to stillness (wuji).

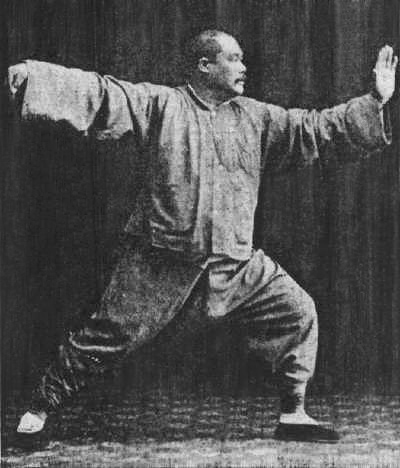
- Yang Chengfu (c. 1931) in Single Whip posture of Yang-style tai chi solo form
- Also known as: See etymology
- Focus: Taoism
- Hardness: Forms: Competition; Light contact (pushing hands, no strikes); Full contact (strikes, kicks, throws, takedowns etc.)
- Country of origin: China
- Date of formation: late 16th century
- Creator: Chen Wangting or Zhang Sanfeng
- Famous practitioners: Chen Wangting; Chen Changxing; Chen Qingping; Chen Fake; Yang Luchan; Yang Chengfu; Cheng Man-ch'ing; Wu Quanyou; Wu Jianquan; Wu Yuxiang; Sun Lutang
- Olympic sport: Demonstration sport

Taijiquan
- UNESCO Intangible Cultural Heritage
- Country: China
- Reference: 424
- Region: Asia and the Pacific

Inscription history
- Inscription: 2020 (15th session)
- List: Representative
- UNESCO Cultural Heritage

Tai chi
- Traditional Chinese: 太極拳
- Simplified Chinese: 太极拳
- Literal meaning: "Taiji Fist"
Transcriptions
Standard Mandarin
- Hanyu Pinyin: Tàijíquán
- Bopomofo: ㄊㄞˋ ㄐㄧˊ ㄑㄩㄢˊ
- Wade–Giles: T'ai^{4}-chi^{2} ch'üan^{2}
- IPA: [tʰâɪ.tɕǐ tɕʰɥɛ̌n]
Yue: Cantonese
- Yale Romanization: Taai-gihk kyùhn
- Jyutping: Taai3 gik6 kyun4
- IPA: [tʰaj˧ kɪk̚˨ kʰyn˩]
Southern Min
- Hokkien POJ: Thài-ke̍k kûn
- Tâi-lô: Thài-ki̍k kûn

Tai chi is a Chinese martial art initially created for combat and self-defense. For most practitioners, it has evolved into an exercise, a relaxation technique, and a sport. As an exercise and relaxation technique, tai chi is practiced in set sequences known as "forms" (taolu), usually in gentle flowing motions that are often described as "meditation in motion," and may also be performed in faster and more vigorous routines. As a sport, competitors are judged on their performance in forms, pushing hands, and free sparring. As a martial art, practitioners master the applications of forms and partner work for effective self-defense.

Many styles of tai chi are practiced, both traditional and modern. While the precise origins are not known, the earliest well-documented practice began during the Ming-Qing transition at Chen Village and Zhabao Village in Henan on the North China Plain, a region where centuries of rebellions, invasions, and adverse economic and social conditions nurtured the development of a wide range of martial arts, including those of the Shaolin Monastery on Mount Song at the western edge of the plain.

Most modern styles trace their development to five traditional schools: Chen, Yang, Wu (Hao), Wu, and Sun. In the early 20th century Yang Chengfu, Wu Jianquan, Sun Lutang, and others promoted and standardized the art for its health benefits in programs supported by the Nationalist government, an approach that was further expanded and institutionalized by the PRC government after 1949. In 2020, tai chi was included in the UNESCO Representative List of the Intangible Cultural Heritage of Humanity.

== Etymology ==
The name "tai chi", the most common English spelling, is not a standard romanization of the Chinese name for the art (simplified Chinese: 太极拳; traditional Chinese: 太極拳; lit. 'Taiji boxing'). The Chinese name was first commonly written in English using the Wade–Giles system as "tʻai chi chʻüan". But English speakers abbreviated it to "tʻai chi" and dropped the mark of aspiration. Since the late twentieth century, pinyin has been officially adopted in China and replaced Wade–Giles as the most popular system for romanizing Chinese. In pinyin, tai chi is spelled tàijíquán. In English, tai chi is sometimes referred to as "shadowboxing".

| Characters | Wade–Giles | Pinyin | Meaning |
|---|---|---|---|
| 太極 | tʻai chi | tàijí | Taiji, the cosmological relationship of Yin and Yang |
| 拳 | chʻüan | quán | fist, or boxing |

The etymology of tai chi's Chinese name is somewhat uncertain because of the lack of a record of spoken usage. Before the mid-nineteenth century, it appears that outsiders generically described the art as zhanquan (沾拳; "touch boxing"), "Long Boxing"(長拳), (Note: "Long" as in "Continuous"; not to be confused with the external martial art also known as Long Fist or Changquan.) mianquan ("Soft/Cotton/Neutralizing Boxing"; 軟/棉/化拳) or shisan shi (十三式; "the thirteen techniques"). In the mid-nineteenth century, the art began to be associated with the philosophy of taiji (see Conceptual background). This association may have originated in the writings of the founders of Wu (Hao)-style tai chi, perhaps inspired by a tai chi classic attributed to the semi-mythical Wang Zongyue that begins with the words "Taiji is born from Wuji; it is the mother of Yin and Yang". (Note: Original text: 太極者. 無極而生. 陰陽之母也.) However, as the Wu (Hao) founders had no financial need to promote their art, their contributions to the "tai chi classics" were not distributed widely for many years. The first public association between taiji and the art was a poem by Imperial Court scholar Weng Tonghe describing a tai chi performance by Yang Luchan. It is not clear whether Weng was making a new connection or whether the new name was already in use. Written evidence for the Yang family's adoption of the name taiji first appeared in a later text, possibly completed in 1875 by Yang Luchan's son, Yang Banhou, or no later than the first decade of the twentieth century by one or more of Yang Banhou's disciples. By the second decade of the twentieth century, Yang Chengfu's disciples and Sun Lutang were using the term taijiquan in their publications, including in the titles of some of the tai chi classics. It then appeared in a book by a Chen family member, Chen Xin, published after he died in 1929.

== Philosophical background ==
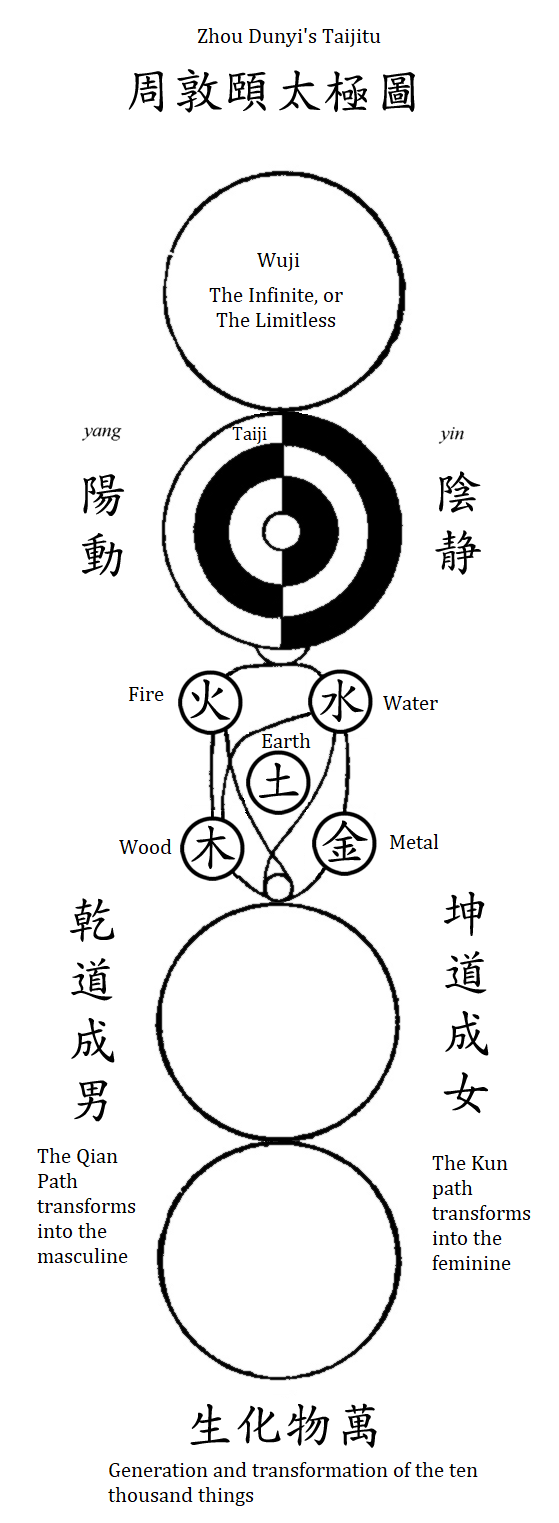
Zhou Dunyi's Taijitu diagram which illustrates the Taijitu cosmology.

Chinese philosophy, particularly Taoist and Confucian thought, forms the conceptual background to tai chi. Early tai chi texts include embedded quotations from early Chinese classics like the I Ching, Great Learning, Book of Documents, Records of the Grand Historian, and Zhuangzi, as well as from famous Chinese thinkers like Zhu Xi, Zhou Dunyi, and Mencius.

Early tai chi sources are grounded in Taiji cosmology. Taiji cosmology appears in both Taoist and Confucian philosophy, where it represents the single source or mother of yin and yang (represented by the taijitu symbol). Tai chi also draws on Chinese theories of the body, particularly Taoist neidan (internal alchemy) teachings on qi (vital energy) and on the three dantian. Cheng Man-ch'ing emphasizes the Taoist background of tai chi and states that it "enables us to reach the stage of undifferentiated pure yang, which is exactly the same as Laozi's 'concentrating the qi and developing softness'".

As such, tai chi considers itself an "internal" (neijia) martial art focused on developing qi. In China, tai chi is categorized under the Wudang group of Chinese martial arts—that is, arts applied with internal power. Although the term Wudang suggests these arts originated in the Wudang Mountains, it is used only to distinguish the skills, theories, and applications of neijia from those of the Shaolin grouping, or waijia (hard/external styles).

Tai chi also adopts the Taoist ideals of softness overcoming hardness, of wu wei (effortless action), and of yielding into its martial art technique while also retaining Taoist ideas of spiritual self-cultivation.

Tai chi's path is one of developing naturalness by relaxing, attending inward, and slowing mind, body, and breath. This allows the practitioner to become less tense, to drop conditioned habits, to let go of thoughts, to allow qi to flow smoothly, and thus to flow with the Tao. It is thus a kind of moving meditation that allows us to let go of the self and experience no-mind (wuxin) and spontaneity (ziran).

A key aspect of tai chi philosophy is to work with the flow of yin (softness) and yang (hardness) elements. When two forces push each other with equal force, neither side moves. Motion cannot occur until one side yields. Therefore, a key principle in tai chi is to avoid using force directly against force (hardness against hardness). Laozi provided the archetype for this in the Tao Te Ching when he wrote, "The soft and the pliable will defeat the hard and strong." Conversely, when in possession of leverage, one may want to use hardness to force the opponent to become soft. Traditionally, tai chi uses both soft and hard. Yin is said to be the mother of Yang, using soft power to create hard power.

Traditional schools also emphasize that one is expected to show wude ("martial virtue/heroism"), to protect the defenceless, and to show mercy to one's opponents.

In December 2020, the 15th regular session of the UNESCO Intergovernmental Committee for the Safeguarding of the Intangible Cultural Heritage included tai chi in the UNESCO Representative List of the Intangible Cultural Heritage of Humanity.

== Practice ==
Tai chi uses 'song' (鬆) to ground the practitioner's centre of gravity, which is harmonised with the rising of the head to produce a central equilibrium and the movements of the forms through asymmetries in balance. Often described as "meditation in motion," tai chi aims to cultivate harmony, maintain health, and improve efficiency of movement through relaxed alignment of the body’s structure.

Traditionally, the foundational tai chi practice consists of learning and practicing specific solo forms or routines (taolu). This entails learning a routine sequence of movements which follow a strict set of mechanical rules, abdominal breathing and a range of motion restricted to oblique angles and which are not 'double weighted' (双重). Tai chi relies on correct alignment in response to oncoming forces, by so-called 'yielding' or 'rotation' a practitioner manipulates an attack with the 'Eight Gates' (Bā Mén 八門). depending on how the opponent force is expressed. This practice is supplemented with Silk Reeling exercises, but these are only found in Chen and Wu(Hao) Style of Tai chi.

There are also numerous other supporting solo practices which are not directly linked to tai chi such as:

- Sitting meditation: to empty, focus and calm the mind and aid in opening the microcosmic orbit.
- Standing meditation (zhan zhuang) to raise the yang qi
- Qigong to mobilize the qi
- Acupressure massage to develop awareness of qi channels

There is no scientific evidence for the existence of qi, nor any demonstrating the effectiveness of acupressure beyond that of placebo treatment. However, they can have an instrumental function in interpreting culturally embedded information for modern practitioners.

Further training entails learning tuishou (push hands drills), sanshou (striking techniques), free sparring, grappling training, and weapons training.

The fundamental training concepts of the art are detailed in a few dozen classical texts originally written in classical Chinese by tai chi masters, the "tai chi classics". In these texts, it is noted that the physiological and kinesiological aspects of the body's movements are characterized by the rotation of the pelvis ('kua'), based on the metaphors of the pelvis as the hub and the arms and feet as the spokes of a wheel. Furthermore, the respiration of breath is coordinated with the physical movements in a state of myofascial release (MFR), rather than held muscular tension.

Tai chi is a complete martial art system with a full range of bare-hand movement sets and weapon forms, such as the jian (straight sword), dao (curved sword), and qiang (spear), which are based on the dynamic relationship between yin and yang. While tai chi is typified by its slow movements, many styles (including the three most popular: Yang, Wu, and Chen) can be practiced at a faster pace when the practitioner has correct alignment after enough slow form practice. Some traditional schools teach martial applications of the postures of different forms (taolu).

=== Solo practices ===
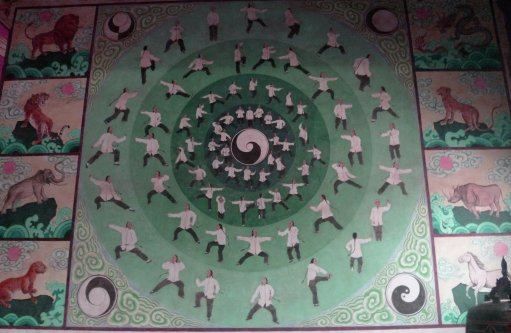
Painting in Chenjiagou, illustrating taolu according to the Chen style of tai chi

Taolu (solo "forms") are choreographed sets of movements practiced alone or in unison as a group. Tai chi is often characterized by slow movements in Taolu practice, and one of the reasons is to develop bodily awareness. Repeated and correct practice of the solo routine is said to retrain posture to align ones centre of gravity which is harmonised with the rising of the head to produce a central equilibrium and the movements of the forms through asymmetries in balance. This awareness and healthy exercise encourages controlled breathing, flexibility, strength, stamina, balance and coordination. Practice familiarizes students with the martial sequences implied by the forms to develop 'spontaneity' (ziran) in application from muscle memory. Usually performed standing, solo forms have sometimes been adapted for seated practice.

=== Weapon practice ===
Taijijian

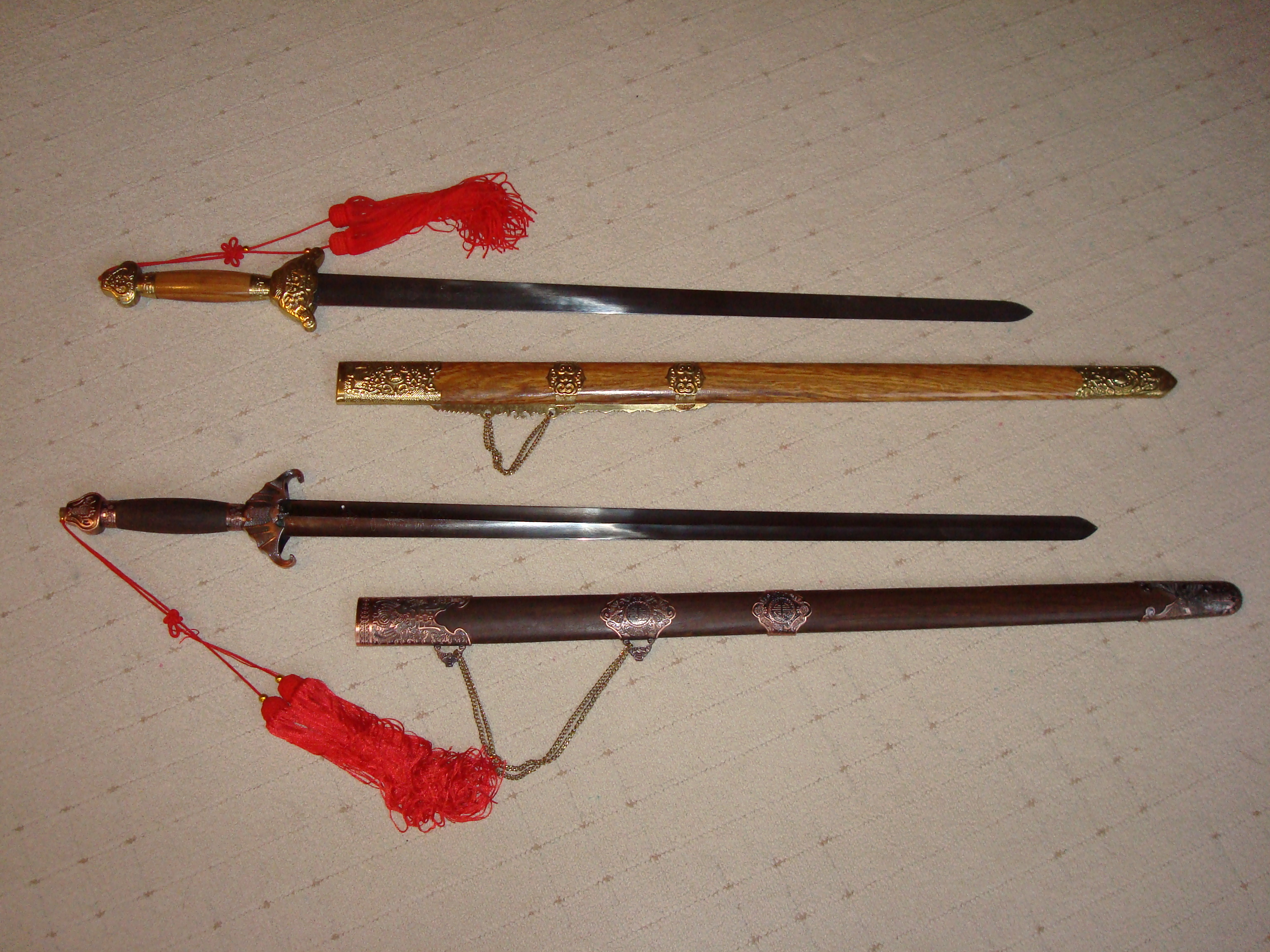
A pair of jian with their scabbards

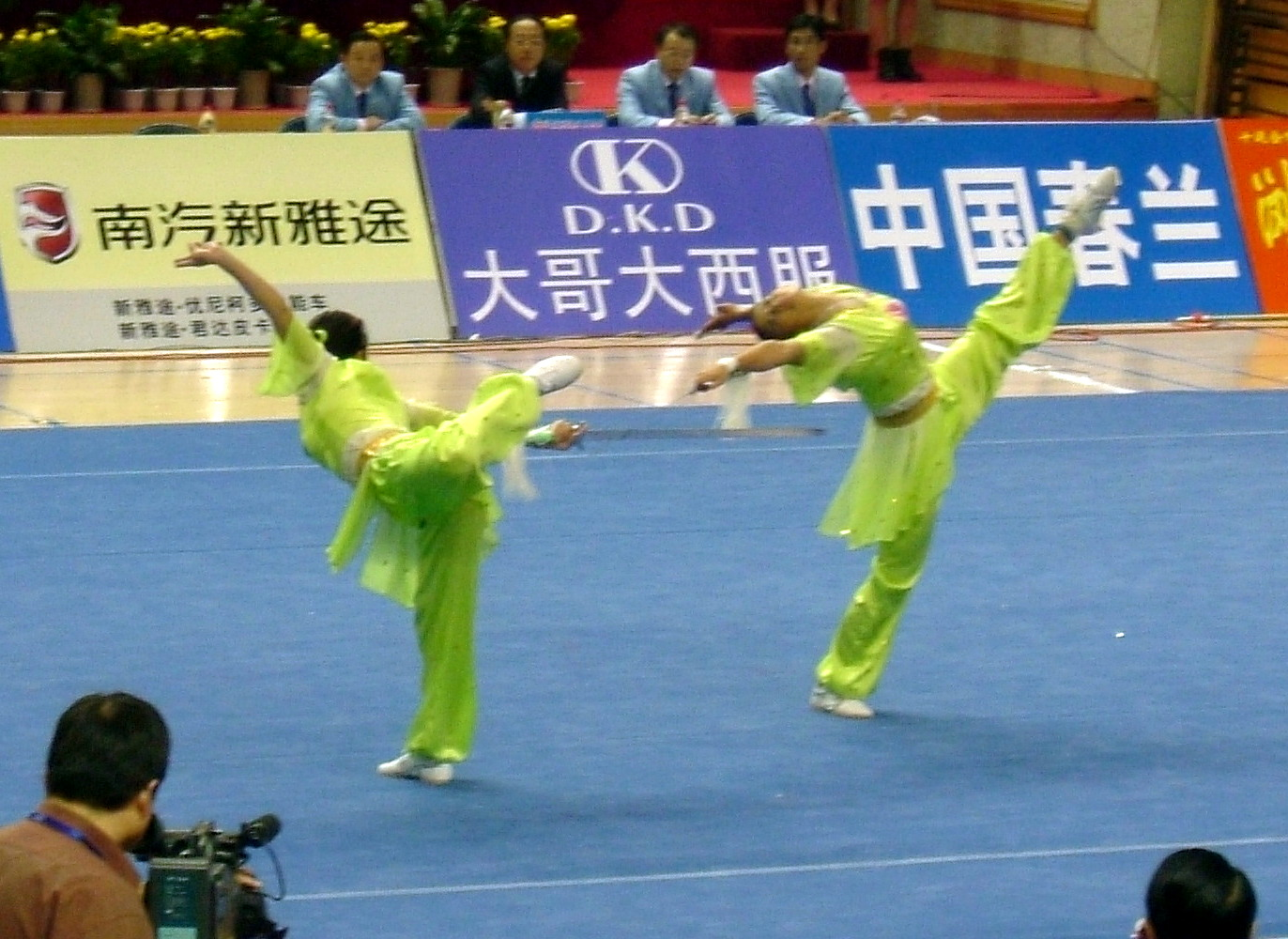
Wushu jian pair event at the 10th All China games

Tai chi practices involving weapons also exist. Weapons training and fencing applications often employ:

- the jian, a straight double-edged sword, practiced as taijijian;
- the dao, a heavier curved saber, sometimes called a broadsword;
- the tieshan, a folding fan, also called shan and practiced as taijishan;
- the gun, a 2-meter (6 1/2 ft) long wooden staff and practiced as taijigun;
- the qiang, a 2-meter (6 1/2 ft) spear or a 4-meter-long (13 ft) lance.

Among these, the taijijian is trained as an extension of the practitioner's body to cultivate tactile sensitivity (tingjin, 听劲) and issue internal power (fa jin) through the blade tip, often paired with a pommel tassel (jiansui, 剑穗) to develop whole-body coordination. Unlike hyper-flexible modern wushu competition blades, traditional practice taijijian use an unsharpened, semi-flexible steel blade with a raised central ridge (jianji, 剑脊), typically weighing 590–630 g (1.30–1.39 lb) un-scabbarded with a point of balance 6.0–9.0 cm (2.4–3.5 in) ahead of the guard and housed in a solid hardwood scabbard (such as jichi wood) to support relaxed wrist alignment.

Tai chi principles may be applied to any kind of melee weapon which can include:

- the large dadao and podao sabres;
- the ji, or halberd;
- the cane;
- the sanjiegun, or three sectional staff;
- the feng huo lun, or wind-and-fire wheels.

== History ==
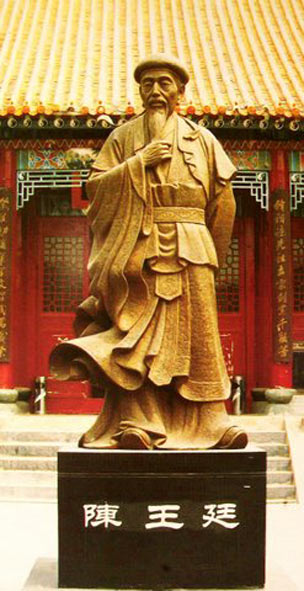
A statue of Chen Wangting, an early pioneer of tai chi

=== Early development ===
Tai chi developed during the Ming-Qing transition period, and may have been based on internal martial arts practices of the Ming dynasty, though the exact details are controversial and subject to much conflicting historical research and debate. The earliest practice documented in widely-accepted historical records began during that period of dynastic transition, in Chen Village and Zhabao Village in Henan on the North China Plain, a region where centuries of rebellions, invasions, and adverse economic and social conditions nurtured the development of a wide range of martial arts, including those of the Shaolin Monastery on Mount Song at the western edge of the plain.

Tai chi has a strong association with Taoism and traditional Chinese culture, which was increasingly emphasized during the late Qing, and by the early twentieth century was integral to any discussion of the art. Some scholars place it within the broader syncretic context of Chinese Taoism, Confucianism, and Buddhism, but most point to stories of the transmission of the art through a legendary twelfth-century immortal Taoist sage, Zhang Sanfeng.

Modern historians point out that the earliest reference indicating a connection between Zhang Sanfeng and martial arts is actually a 17th-century piece called Epitaph for Wang Zhengnan (1669), composed by Huang Zongxi (1610–1695). Aside from this single source, the other claims of connections between tai chi and Zhang Sanfeng appeared no earlier than the 19th century. According to Douglas Wile, "there is no record of a Zhang Sanfeng in the Song Dynasty (960–1279), and there is no mention in the Ming (1368–1644) histories or hagiographies of Zhang Sanfeng of any connection between the immortal and the martial arts."

Historical documentation for the development of tai chi as it is practiced today begins with Chen Wangting, who retired from military service and returned to Chen Village after the fall of the Ming dynasty. Based on some of the terminology used in the art Chen and his descendants developed, it appears to draw from the Quanjing (Classic of Pugilism) by the Ming general Qi Jiguang. Early twentieth-century martial arts historians agreed with this, though Xu Zhen claimed that Chen tai chi was also influenced by the Taizu changquan style practiced at nearby Shaolin Monastery, while Tang Hao emphasized the connection to the writings of Qi Jiguang.

Yang Luchan, the founder of the popular Yang style of tai chi, trained with Chen Changxing in Chen Village for 18 years before returning to teach in his hometown of Yongnian and later in Beijing. The other traditional tai chi styles, Wu (Hao), Wu, and Sun, also trace the source of their tai chi through Yang Luchan back to the Chen village in the nineteenth century.

=== Standardization ===
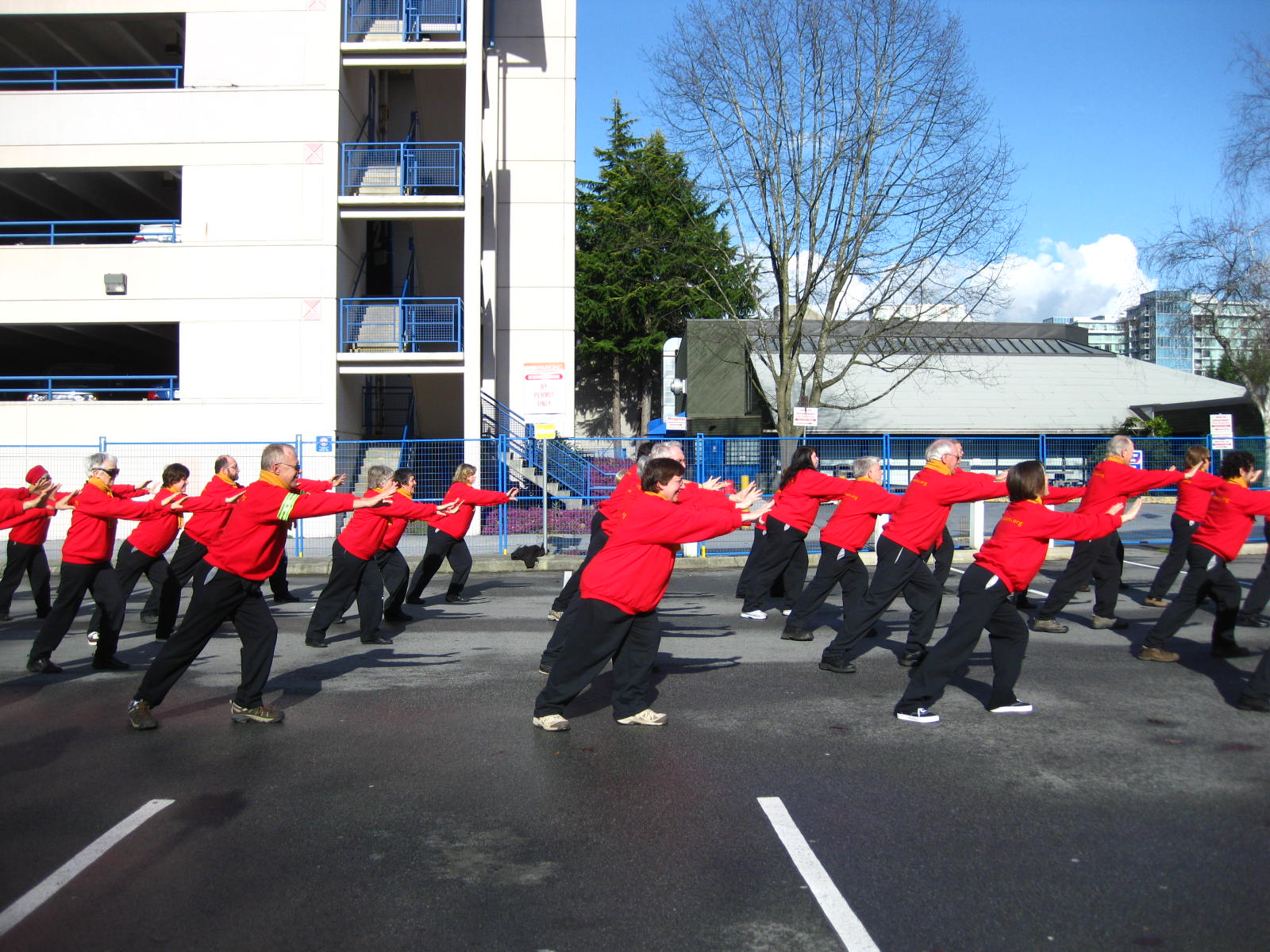
Taoist practitioners practising

In 1912 the Nationalist government-supported Beijing Physical Education Research Institute (京師體育研究社; Jīngshì Tǐyù Yánjiùshè) published tai chi manuals, possibly brought to Beijing by Yang Luchan himself, for the first time under the title Taijiquan Classics, as Yang Chengfu, Wu Jianquan, Sun Lutang, and others began teaching classes for the general public there. Based on that experience, by 1914 they began standardizing and modifying the art, removing most fast and jumping movements, and focusing primarily on health results.

This work was continued by the Central Guoshu Institute. In 1936 the Institute's Deputy Director, Chen Panling (陳泮嶺), created a 99-posture unified form called Guoshu Tai Chi (國術太極; Guóshù Tàijí) drawing on his research into the Chen, Yang, Sun and Wu styles, with most movements derived from the Yang and Wu forms. After the retreat of the Nationalists to Taiwan in 1949, Chen Panling established and served as chairman of the Chinese Martial Arts Advanced Studies Association (中華國術進修會; Zhōnghuá Guóshù Jìnxiūhuì), where he taught his combined tai chi sequence, which became known worldwide as the 99 Tai Chi Form, as well as the internal martial arts Baguazhang and Xingyiquan. Chen trained many prominent masters, including Wang Shujin.

After 1949 the PRC government continued standardization of the art with a focus on health. In 1956, the Chinese Sports Committee (CSC) brought together a group of tai chi masters to create a shortened tai chi form that could help improve the health of the general public, because the long traditional forms were considered too difficult for most people to learn. The result was the 24-posture simplified form, developed from the traditional Yang-style long form.

In 1976, as part of a post-Cultural Revolution initiative to rehabilitate martial arts as a modern sport, the "Combined 48 Form" was created for the CSC by a group of wushu coaches headed by Men Huifeng. That form integrates movements from the traditional Chen, Yang, Wu, and Sun styles. By the 1980s the CSC had also begun organizing other groups of wushu coaches to standardize longer competition forms for the major styles, including the 56-posture Chen-style national competition form published in 1988, and in 1989 the Combined 48 Form was shortened into the "42 Form", also known as the "Competition Form", for competition timing and scoring. This work of developing shorter forms for competition and for exercise convenience has continued through the present day, for example two short forms based on Yang style, the "8-Posture Tai Chi" form officially announced in 1999 and the "Eight Methods and Five Stances" form first published in 2018.

At the 1990 11th Asian Games, wushu competitions were included for the first time, with the 42 Form representing tai chi. That year the International Wushu Federation (IWUF) also submitted an application for wushu to become a permanent part of the Olympic Games.

In 2020, tai chi was included in the UNESCO List of Intangible Cultural Heritage of Humanity after the Chinese government submitted it for this recognition.

== Styles ==
=== Chinese origin ===
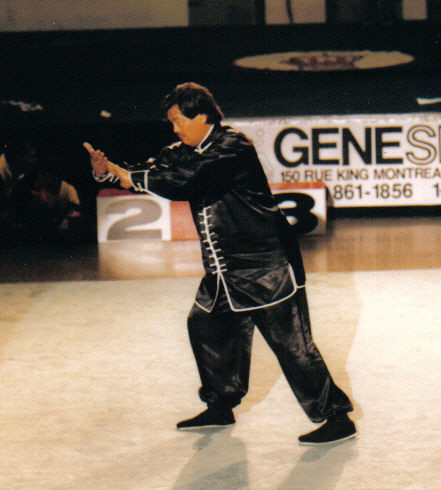
Wu-style master Eddie Wu demonstrating the form "Grasp the bird's tail" at a tournament in Toronto, Ontario, Canada

The five major styles of tai chi are named for the Chinese families who originated them:

- Chen style (陳氏) of Chen Wangting (1580–1660)
- Yang style (楊氏) of Yang Luchan (1799–1872)
- Wu/Hao style (武郝氏) of Wu Yuxiang (1812–1880) and Hao Weizhen (1842–1920)
- Wu style (吳氏) of Wu Quanyou (1834–1902) and his son Wu Jianquan (1870–1942)
- Sun style (孫氏) of Sun Lutang (1861–1932)

The most popular is Yang, followed by Wu, Chen, Sun, and Wu/Hao. The styles share underlying theory, but their training differs.

Dozens of new styles, hybrid styles, and offshoots followed, although the family schools are accepted as standard by the international community. Other important styles are Zhaobao tai chi, a close cousin of Chen style, which is recognized by Western practitioners; Fu style, created by Fu Zhensong, which evolved from Chen, Sun and Yang styles, and incorporates movements from baguazhang; and Cheng Man-ch'ing style, which simplifies Yang style.

Around the world in the 20th and 21st centuries, some Chinese emigrants who had learned tai chi in China continued to practice it together in their new communities.

=== North America ===
==== United States ====
Choy Hok Pang, a disciple of Yang Chengfu, was the first known proponent of tai chi to openly teach in the United States, beginning in 1939. His son and student Choy Kam Man emigrated to San Francisco from Hong Kong in 1949 to teach tai chi in Chinatown. Choy Kam Man taught until he died in 1994.

Sophia Delza, a professional dancer and student of Ma Yueliang, performed the first known public demonstration of tai chi in the United States at the New York City Museum of Modern Art in 1954. She wrote the first English language book on tai chi, T'ai-chi Ch'üan: Body and Mind in Harmony, in 1961. She taught regular classes at Carnegie Hall, the Actors Studio, and the United Nations.

Huang Wenshan, a Chinese-American scholar and pioneer of cultural studies, has been called "the father of Tai Chi in the America." A student of Dong Yingjie and a lifelong advocate of tai chi, in 1962 with the help of Marshall Ho'o, a former student of Choy Hok Pang, he founded the National Tai Chi Chuan Institute in Los Angeles, and the first nationwide organization of tai chi schools in the USA, the National Tai Chi Chuan Association. In 1973 Huang wrote one of the earliest comprehensive and popular books on the topic in English, Fundamentals of Tai Chi Chuan. From 1973 to 1974 Marshall Ho'o hosted a television show on tai chi broadcasting from Los Angeles, which began weekly, grew to four times per week, and was picked up by other stations across the country as its popularity grew. Ho'o also promoted the art in Black Belt magazine, authored a book on tai chi, and co-founded the Aspen Academy of Martial Arts.

Tung Hu Ling, son of Dong Yingjie and a pioneer in the spread of tai chi outside of China, was invited for a teaching tour of Los Angeles, San Francisco, New York, Toronto, and Hawaii organized by Huang and Ho'o from 1966 to 1967 During that tour Tung taught for a term at Huang's Los Angeles school assisted by Ho'o, who said that was "the first time a tai chi master came to us." Within a year Tung returned to found a school in Hawaii later led by his son Dong Zengchen and now by his grandson Alex Dong who is based in New York, while in 1971 his son Tung Kai Ying founded a school in Los Angeles now run by Kai Ying's son Tung Chen-wei, and from those centers the family has grown a global network of schools and workshops.

Cheng Man-ch'ing opened his Shr Jung Tai Chi School after he moved to New York from Taiwan in 1964. Unlike the older generation of practitioners, Cheng was cultured and educated in American ways, and thus was able to transcribe Yang's dictation into a written manuscript that became the de facto manual for Yang style. Cheng felt Yang's traditional 108-movement form was unnecessarily long and repetitive, which makes it difficult to learn. He thus created a shortened 37-movement version that he taught in his schools. Cheng's form became the dominant form in the eastern United States until other teachers immigrated in larger numbers in the 1990s. He taught until his death in 1975.

==== Canada ====
Chen Zhonghua arrived as a Chen style practitioner, teacher, and author from Shandong, China. He studied under two experts of the eighteenth generation of Chen-style tai chi, Hong Junsheng and Feng Zhiqiang (冯志强, 1928–2012). In 1985 he and his family emigrated to Canada, where he began to promote Hong's version of Chen-style tai chi to a western audience.

Another is Moy Lin-shin who arrived in Toronto, Canada, from China in 1970, where he started teaching tai chi and related internal arts.

=== Europe ===
==== Italy ====
M°Chang Dsu Yao (1918–1992) was the first Chinese Master to introduce Traditional Chinese martial arts to Italy. After a military career and teaching martial arts in Taiwan, he moved to Italy in 1975. There, he began teaching Tai Chi Chuan, that he had learned from Yang Chengfu, and Shaolin Kung Fu. His teachings attracted numerous students, among them Roberto Fassi, with whom he co-authored several martial arts publications.

==== United Kingdom ====
Norwegian Pytt Geddes was the first European to teach tai chi in Britain, holding classes at The Place in London in the early 1960s. She had first encountered tai chi in Shanghai in 1948, and studied with Choy Hok Pang and his son Choy Kam Man (who both also taught in the United States) while living in Hong Kong in the late 1950s.

== Yin and yang ==
In Daoist philosophy motion cannot be manifested without inertia, in tai chi this is yin and yang. There must be a functionally unmoving aspect for there to be any manifestation of motion. In absence of a yin/yang demarcation (i.e when motion is completely unobstructed) 'wuji' (無極) is apparent, it is just as one cannot walk without a floor to push against. This absence of yin/yang separation is applied practically as 'double weightedness' (双重). This error is what practitioners train to remove in themselves by form and push hands practice and to exploit in their opponents when applied in martial contexts.

Some practitioners interpret yin and yang as the two aspects of health and martial arts The "family" schools present their teachings in a martial art context, whatever the intention of their students.

== Health ==
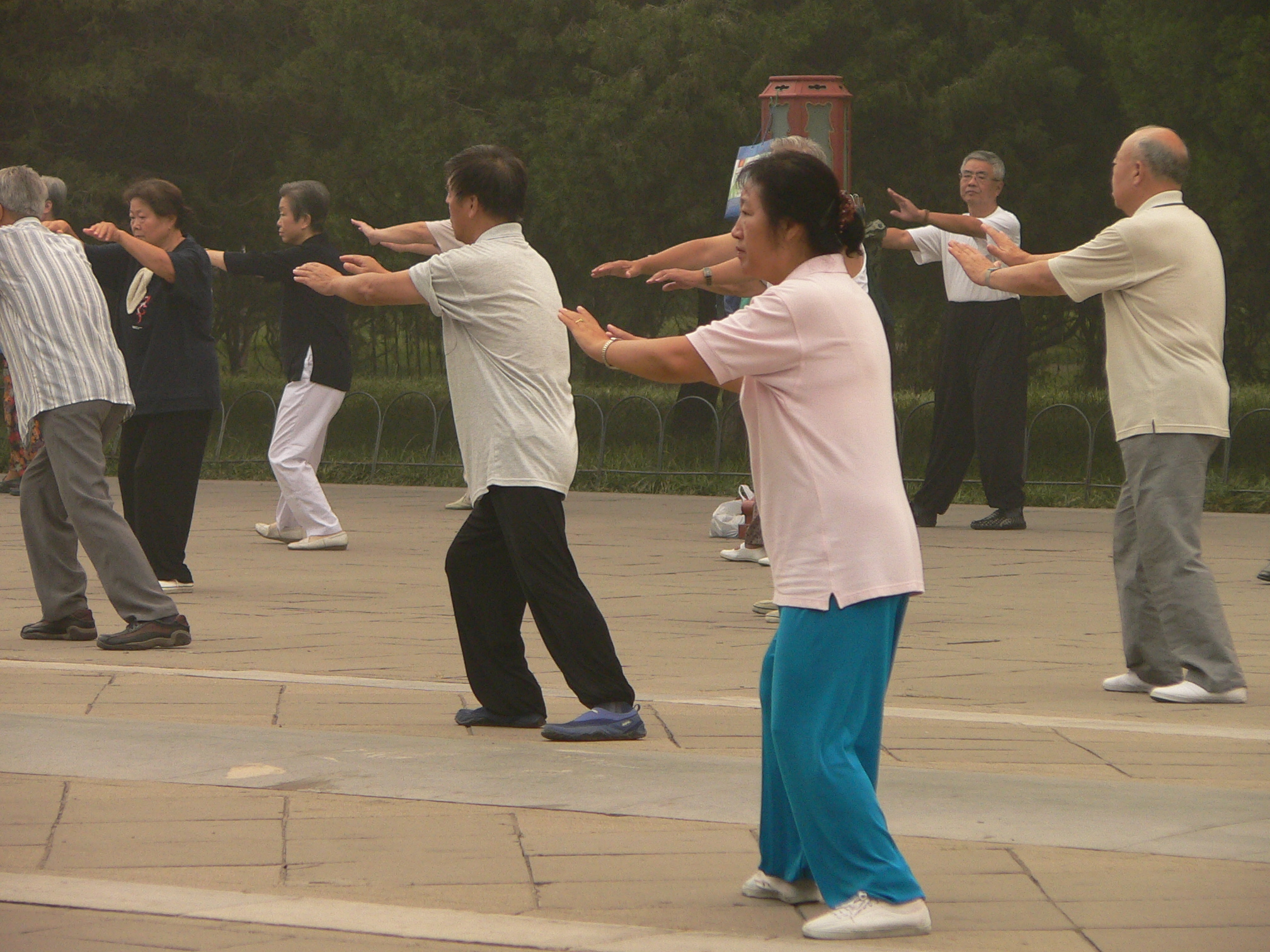
Outdoor practice in Beijing's Temple of Heaven

Tai chi's health training concentrates on preservation through correct alignment, which relieves stress on the body and mind; good posture, which can relieve joint pain by allowing weight to transfer properly; and aerobic exercise, which develops flexibility, strength, stamina, balance, and coordination. In the 21st century, tai chi classes that purely emphasize health are popular in hospitals, clinics, community centres and senior centres. Tai chi's low-stress training method for seniors has become better known.

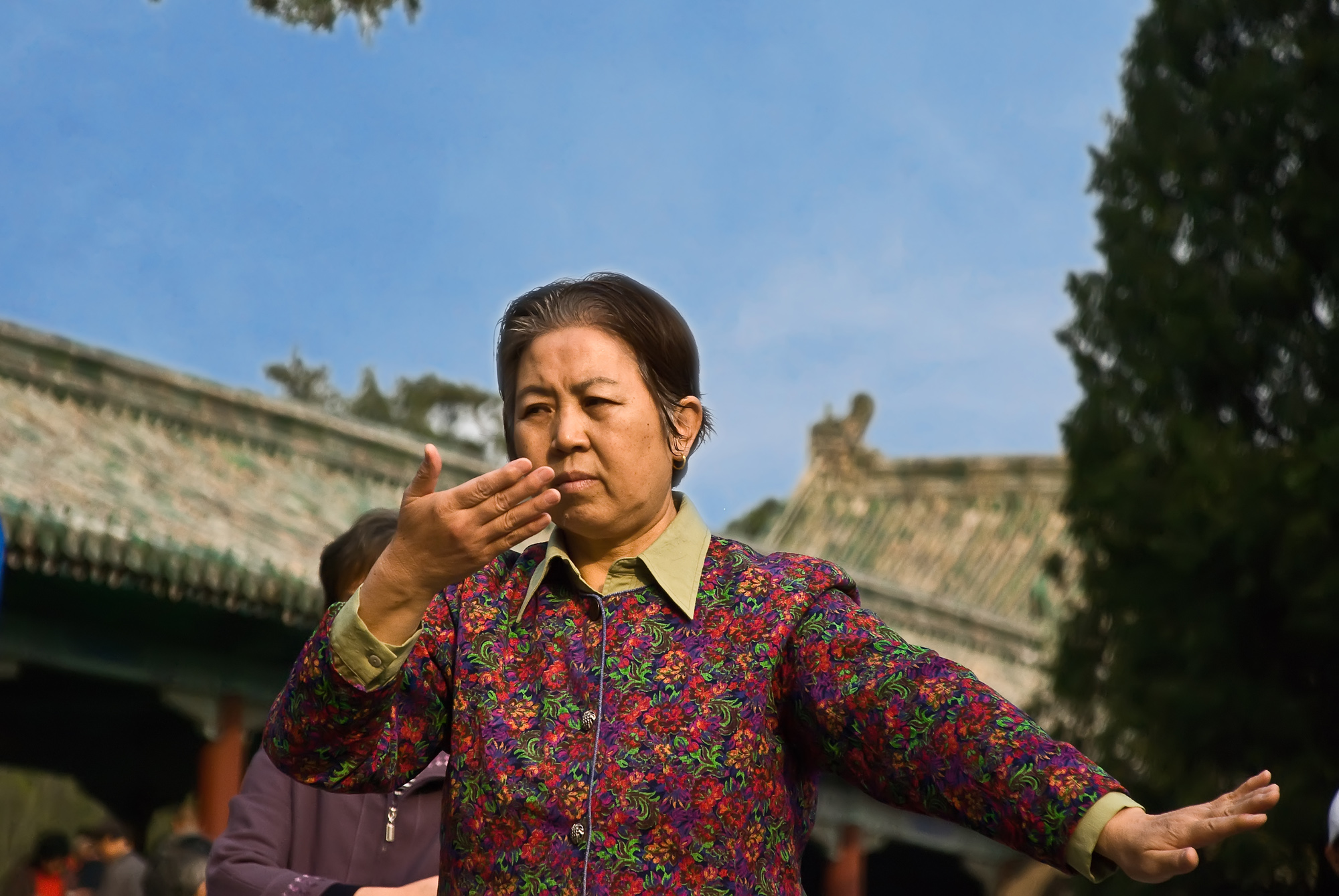
A Chinese woman performs Yang-style tai chi.

Clinical studies exploring tai chi's effect on specific diseases and health conditions exist, though there are insufficient studies with consistent approaches to generate a comprehensive conclusion.

Tai chi has been promoted for treating various ailments, and is supported by the Parkinson's Foundation and Diabetes Australia, among others. However, medical evidence of effectiveness is lacking for these conditions. A 2017 systematic review found that it decreased falls in older people.

A 2011 comprehensive overview of systematic reviews of tai chi recommended tai chi to older people for its physical and psychological benefits. It found positive results for fall prevention and overall mental health. No conclusive evidence showed benefit for most of the conditions researched, including Parkinson's disease, diabetes, cancer and arthritis. However, clinical reviews compiled by the United States Department of Veterans Affairs demonstrate that tai chi provides positive health benefits for individuals with conditions such as Parkinson's disease, hypertension, and joint pain.

A 2015 systematic review found that tai chi could be performed by those with chronic medical conditions such as chronic obstructive pulmonary disease, heart failure, and osteoarthritis without negative effects, and found favourable effects on functional exercise capacity.

In 2015 the Australian Government's Department of Health published the results of a review of alternative therapies that sought to identify any that were suitable for coverage by health insurance. Tai chi was one of 17 therapies evaluated. The study concluded that low-quality evidence suggests that tai chi may have some beneficial health effects when compared to control in a limited number of populations for a limited number of outcomes.

A 2020 review of 13 studies found that tai chi had positive effect on the quality of life and depressive symptoms of older adults with chronic conditions who lived in community settings.

In 2022, the U.S.A. agency the National Institutes of Health published an analysis of various health claims, studies and findings. They concluded the evidence was of low quality, but that it appears to have a small positive effect on quality of life.

In 2026, the British Journal of Sports Medicine published an umbrella review of 92 data syntheses encompassing 1,744 randomised controlled clinical trials and found "high certainty evidence" that traditional Chinese exercises, including tai chi, can improve several health outcomes for sufferers of musculoskeletal disorders, including physical function, mental health, sleep quality and bone mineral density. The authors also found that the greatest benefits were seen in those who practised for more than six months, at least three times a week, and for a total of at least 150 minutes per week.

== Sport and competition ==
In addition to its health and meditative aspects, Tai Chi is practiced as a competitive sport in several formats. The most common is tuishou (推手; pushing hands), in which two participants attempt to unbalance, move, or throw one another while maintaining sensitivity and control. Competitions may use fixed-step or moving-step rulesets, depending on whether foot movement is restricted. Scoring typically rewards the ability to displace the opponent through weight shifting, yielding, and redirection.

Tai Chi form routines (tàijíquán tàolù, 太極拳套路) are also performed competitively. These performances are evaluated using criteria such as balance, smoothness, and technical difficulty, sometimes incorporating movements from multiple family styles.

Some organizations promote sanshou (散手; free-hand) or light- to full-contact sparring events intended to show Tai Chi's combative efficacy, though these are less common and often overlap with broader wushu competition formats.

Tournaments are held annually in Europe, Asia and the Americas, with some drawing over 1000 competitors.

== Self-defence and martial application ==
In its martial aspect, tai chi emphasizes defence as attack, by practicing the forms to develop muscle memory (ziran) and using the forms' asymmetries to express the 'Eight Gates' (Bā Mén 八門). Depending on how the opponent uses force, the practitioner allows a rotation through the creation of a fulcrum by yin/yang demarcation thus creating a continuous lever as the perimeter, giving all applications maximum leverage no matter what the opponent does, hence the famous aphorism that "4oz moves 1000lbs" (四两拨千斤). This also requires the maintenance of 'peng' (掤) to underlie 'lu' (捋), 'ji'(挤) & 'an' (按). Further, 'cai' (採), 'lie' (挒), 'zhou' (肘) & 'kao' (靠) can be applied through the various shapes and configurations in the form. These are all done by exploiting the opponents structural flaws like balance from 'double weightedness' (双重) which allows for joint breaks as well as; leg sweeps, kicks, jabs and throws.

== See also ==
- Qigong
- Self-healing
- Wushu
- Yangsheng (Daoism)

== Other names ==
- Tai Ji Quan
- Taijiquan
- Taichi
- Tʻai chi
- Tʻai chi chʻüan

== Sources ==
- Davis, Barbara (2004). Taijiquan Classics: An Annotated Translation. North Atlantic Books. ISBN 1-55643-431-6.
- Wile, Douglas (1996). Lost T'a-Chi Classics from the Late Ch'ing Dynasty. State University of New York Press. ISBN 0-7914-2653-X.
