= Wudang tai chi =

System of tai chi

Wudang tai chi 武當太極拳
- Date founded: mid 20th century
- Country of origin: China
- Founder: Cheng Tin Hung
- Current head: Cheng Kam Yan (鄭鑑恩)
- Arts taught: Tai chi
- Ancestor arts: Wu-style tai chi
- Practitioners: Dan Docherty, Ian Cameron
- Official website: HKTaichi.com

Wudang tai chi (Chinese: 武當太極拳) is the name of a system of tai chi that was developed by a Hong Kong-based tai chi master Cheng Tin Hung. While Cheng never claimed to be teaching any particular school of tai chi, his uncle was a disciple of the Wu-style tai chi, which may or may not have had some influence on his own approach to the art.

The Wudang tai chi system is now being taught in Europe by two of Cheng Tin Hung's disciples, Dan Docherty and Ian Cameron, both based in the United Kingdom. The system also continues to be taught in Hong Kong, and the current head of that school is Cheng Tin Hung's son Cheng Kam Yan (鄭鑑恩), whose school is called the Hong Kong Tai Chi Association.

Zhang Sanfeng, a highly mythologised figure said to be the founder of tai chi, lived in the Wudang Mountains and the name "Wudang" used for this tai chi system was used in order to acknowledge Zhang Sanfeng's status as the founder of tai chi. There are other schools of tai chi that also use this name.

The Wudang tai chi system is also known as “practical tai chi”. This name comes from that given to Cheng Tin Hung's style by various Chinese martial arts journalists in Hong Kong during Cheng's heyday, and from the school's assertion that its tai chi is eminently useful as a form of self-defense.

The Wudang tai chi system teachers publish that they have links to famous tai chi masters (see lineage diagram), including Yang Banhou, Wu Quanyou, Wu Jianquan, Cheng Wing Kwong, Chen Gengyun (陳耕雲) and Wang Lanting (王蘭亭).

== Qi Minxuan ==
It is thought that Qi Minxuan (齊敏軒) came from Wen County, Hebei Dao in Henan Province. His father, Qi Gechen (齊閣臣), was a disciple of the famed tai chi master Wu Quanyou. After losing his family during the Japanese Occupation and Second World War, Qi became an itinerant martial arts instructor teaching tai chi and neigong to those that would give him board and lodgings Qi Minxuan also learnt from a Buddhist monk known as Jing Yi (静一, Tranquil One), who learnt tai chi from Wang Lanting. Qi Minxuan's Buddhist name was Zhi Meng (智孟, Sagacious Elder) and was an enthusiastic student of Chan Buddhism. The fate of Qi Minxuan is unknown.

== Cheng Tin Hung ==
As a young boy, Cheng Tin Hung learned Southern Boxing (南拳) from his father Cheng Minchueng (鄭綿彰), which was a family style, learnt from his father Cheng Lin (鄭麟) who was a professional martial artist. As Cheng Tin Hungg grew older his uncle Cheng Wingkwong (鄭榮光) took an interest in teaching him Wu-style tai chi. Cheng Wingkwong was a formal disciple of Wu Jianquan, who eventually held the rank of Sifu in the Wu family's Hong Kong school. At that ranking he had their encouragement to take on disciples of his own and open his own school. Cheng Wingkwong knew of an itinerant martial artist known as Qi Minxuan whose father was a disciple of the founder of the Wu-style, Wu Quanyou. Cheng Wingkwong arranged for his nephew to train with Master Qi from the summer of 1946 to the winter of 1948. Qi Minxuan advised his new disciple Cheng Tin Hung, that in order to gain a good reputation as a master of tai chi he must be both sound in mind and body and also be able to defend himself, thus being able to represent the art in its true form. Cheng Tin Hung later took the nickname of the "Tai Chi Bodyguard" for his enthusiastic defence of tai chi as a martial art. Cheng liked to drink, eat, and fight as well as train and teach. His predilections may have contributed to the ill-health including the onset of diabetes and its debilitating effects that plagued him in his later years.

== Dan Docherty ==
Dan Docherty was born in Glasgow, Scotland, in 1954. He graduated with an LLB in 1974 and soon after moved to Hong Kong where he served as an inspector in the Royal Hong Kong Police Force until 1984. Soon after he arrived in Hong Kong in 1975 he started training tai chi under Cheng Tin Hung and within a few years was elected to represent Hong Kong in Full-contact Fighting competitions. In 1980 he won the Open Weight Division at the 5th South East Asian Chinese Pugilistic Championships in Malaysia.

In 1985, he was awarded a Postgraduate Diploma in Chinese from Ealing College, London.

He was based in London and travelled extensively teaching and writing about tai chi. Docherty was known for his strong views on the history of tai chi and was seen as a polarizing figure within the world of tai chi. In articles and interviews he spoke of confrontations with other tai chi teachers, including an infamous meeting with one Shen Hong-xun, a master who claimed to have and to teach "empty force", or the ability to move a person without physical contact. The meeting ended up with Docherty pouring water over the head of Shen Hong-Xun, not to prove that empty force does not exist but to suggest that Master Shen was unable to summon and use it at that time.

Later in life he suffered from Parkinsons disease. He died on December 9, 2021.

== Ian Cameron ==
Ian Cameron was born in Edinburgh (Scotland, UK) in 1944. A student of Judo and Karate from a young age, he was also a keen boxer as a teenager. He trained in tai chi with Chen Tin Hung in Hong Kong from 1971 to 1974 whilst serving in the armed forces in Hong Kong. On his return to Edinburgh he set up his class which was to evolve into the Five Winds School of tai chi. He subsequently returned to Hong Kong in 1980 for a month, with the purpose of intensively training with Cheng. Cheng Tin Hung was then Cameron's guest in Scotland the following year, and again in 1985 and 86, teaching seminars throughout the UK. Ian Cameron appeared in Hong Kong newspaper articles with Cheng during the early 70s, and was described in the acknowledgements of Cheng's best known book in the UK (Wutan Tai Chi Chuan) as the "elder brother in TCC" of Dan Docherty, current president of the Tai Chi Union for Great Britain. Cameron was a founder member of the Tai Chi Union for Great Britain, and sits as Technical Director of that body. He remains a leading practitioner and teacher of tai chi in the UK and continues to fervently defend the traditional approach to Cheng's system of training.
