= List of Chinese martial arts =

This article contains a concise listing of individual systems of Chinese martial arts. Listings of various branches of a martial art system are located on a corresponding Wikipedia page which details the history of the system. The following list of Chinese martial arts is by no means exhaustive.

== Alphabetical listing ==
- Bafaquan ("eight methods boxing")
- Baguazhang ("eight trigrams palm")
- Bai He Quan (Fujian White Crane)
- Bajiquan ("eight extremities boxing")
- Bak Fu Pai ("White Tiger Kung Fu")
  - Tiger Kung Fu / Shadong-style Tiger
- Bak Hok Pai ("Tibetian White Crane")
  - Hop Ga Kuen
- Bak Mei Kung Fu ("white eyebrow")
- Baoquan (Leopard fist)
- Bei Tui ("Northern Legs")
- Black Crane Kung Fu
- Changquan ("long boxing")
  - Chaquan
- Chin Na
- Choy Gar
- Choy Li Fut
  - Hung Sing
- Choy Mok
- Chuo Jiao ("strike foot")
- Ditangquan ("ground tumbling boxing")
- DiSom
- Do Pi Kung Fu
- Duanquan ("short-range boxing")
- Emeiquan
- Fanzi ("rotating")
- Feng Shou ("wind hand")
- Fu Jow Pai ("tiger claw style")
- Five Animals
- Fut Gar ("Buddhist family")
- Go-ti Boxing
- Gou Quan ("Dog kung fu")
- Heihuquan ("black tiger boxing" / "Henan black tiger-style")
- Hong Cha
- Hou Quan (Monkey Kung Fu)
- Huaquan
- Hung Fut
- Hung Ga
- Jiu Fa Men
- Jow-Ga kung fu
- Kong-Dao (空道拳)
- Kunlunquan
- Kuntao
- Lai Tung Pai
- Lau Gar
- Li Gar kung fu ("Li family boxing")
- Liuhebafa
- Liq chuan
- Longquan (Dragon Fist)
- Lung Ying (Southern Dragon Form)
- Luohanquan
- Meihuaquan ("plum-blossom boxing")
- Mianquan ("cotton boxing")
- Mizongyi
- Mok Gar
- Nanquan
- Nan Pai Tanglang (Southern Praying Mantis)
- Nan Shaolin Wu Xing Quan (南少林五行拳)
  - Chow Gar
- Northern Shaolin
- Pao Chui
- Piguaquan ("chop-hanging boxing")
- Pushing hands
- Sanda (Chinese kick-boxing)
- Sansoo
- Shaolin kung fu
- Shaolin Nam Pai Chuan
- Shequan (Snake fist)
- Shuai jiao (Chinese wrestling)
- Tai Sheng Men ("Great Sage Kung Fu")
- Tai Shing (Drunken Monkey)
- Taijiquan ("Taiji Boxing")
- Tanglangquan (Northern Praying Mantis)
- Tang Shou Dao
- Tan Tui
- Tien Shan Pai
- Tongbeiquan
- Wing Chun
- Wudangquan
- Wujiquan
- Wu Xing Quan
- Wuzuquan (Five Ancestors)
- Xingyiquan
- Yau Kung Moon
- Ying Zhao Pai (Northern Eagle Claw)
- Yiquan / Da Cheng Quan
- Yuejiaquan ("Yue family boxing")
- Ziranmen
- Zui Quan (Drunken boxing)

== See also ==
- List of martial arts
