= Wushu (sport) =

Type of Chinese martial arts

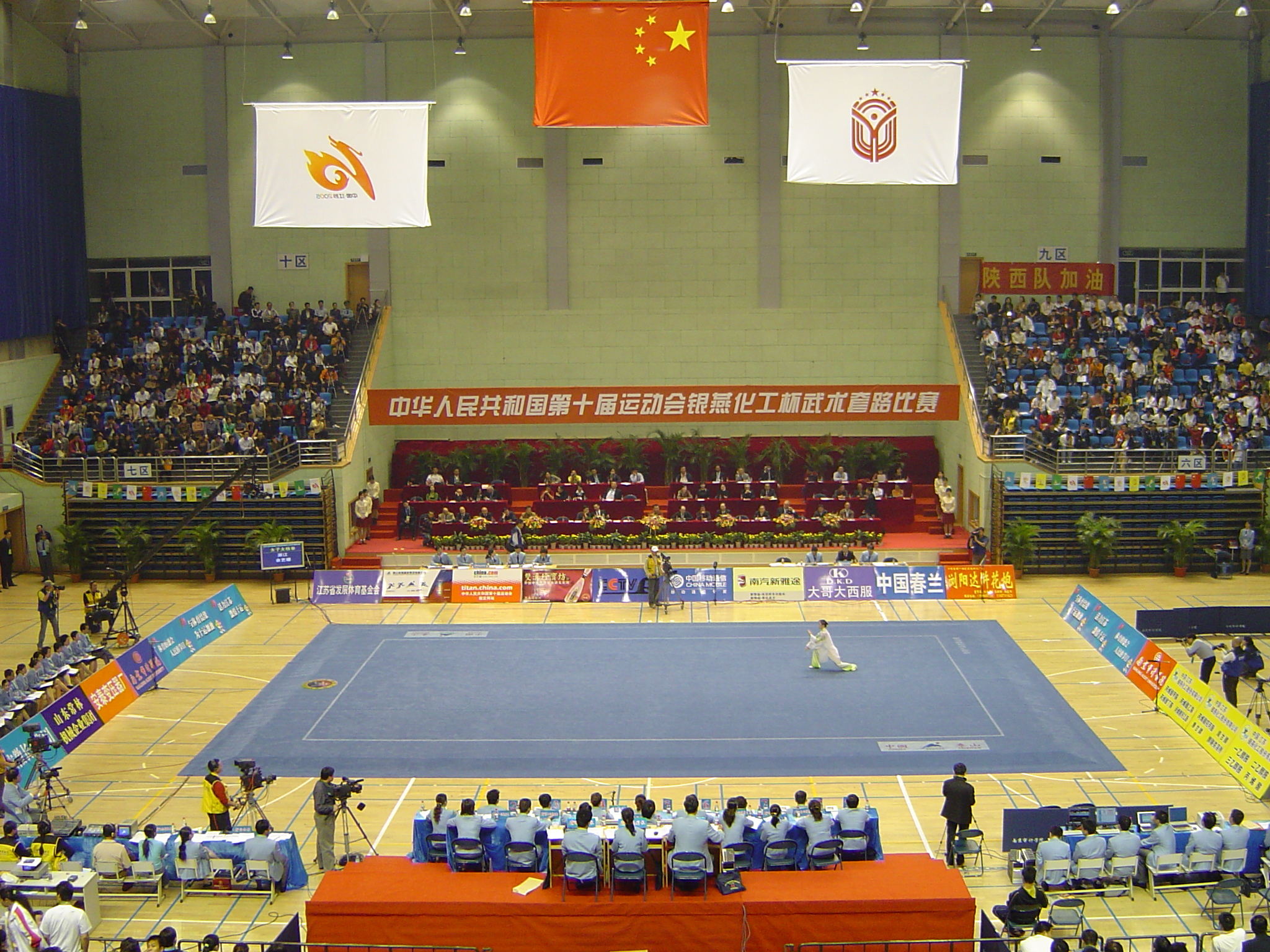
- A typical wushu taolu competition at the 10th All China Games
- Also known as: Kung fu, CMA, WS
- Focus: Striking, Grappling, Throwing, Performance Martial Art
- Country of origin: China
- Famous practitioners: See: Category:Wushu practitioners

Sport
- Highest governing body: International Wushu Federation
- First played: China

Characteristics
- Contact: Dependent on type of Wushu
- Team members: Individuals or Team
- Mixed-sex: Yes
- Type: Martial art
- Venue: Taolu Carpet or Lei Tai (fighting arena)

Presence
- Country or region: Worldwide
- Olympic: (Unofficial Sport) 2008
- World Championships: inaugurated 1991
- World Games: (Invitational Sport) 2009, 2013; (Official) 2022, 2025

Wushu
- Traditional Chinese: 武術
- Simplified Chinese: 武术
- Literal meaning: "Martial arts"
Transcriptions
Standard Mandarin
- Hanyu Pinyin: wǔshù
- Bopomofo: ㄨˇ ㄕㄨˋ
- Wade–Giles: wu^{3}-shu^{4}
- IPA: [ù.ʂû]
Wu
- Suzhounese: vu^{6}-zeq^{8}
Yue: Cantonese
- Yale Romanization: móuh-seuht
- Jyutping: mou5-seot6
- IPA: [mɔw˩˧.sɵt̚˨]
Southern Min
- Tâi-lô: bú-su̍t

Wushu (traditional Chinese: 武術; simplified Chinese: 武术; pinyin: wǔshù) (/ˌwuːˈʃuː/), or kung fu, is a Chinese martial art. It integrates concepts and forms from various traditional and modern Chinese martial arts, including Shaolin kung fu, tai chi, and Wudangquan. "Wushu" is the Chinese term for "martial arts" (武 "Wu" = combat or martial, 術 "Shu" = art), reflecting the art's goal as a compilation and standardization of various styles. To distinguish it from traditional Chinese martial arts, it is sometimes referred to as 'Modern Wushu'.

Wushu is practiced both through forms, called taolu, and as a full-contact combat sport, known as sanda. It has a long history of Chinese martial arts and was developed in 1949 to standardize the practice of traditional Chinese martial arts, though attempts to structure the various decentralized martial arts traditions date back earlier when the Central Guoshu Institute was established at Nanjing in 1928.

In contemporary times, wushu has become an international sport under the International Wushu Federation (IWUF), which holds the World Wushu Championships every two years. Wushu is an official event at the World Games, Asian Games, East Asian Youth Games, Southeast Asian Games, World Combat Games, and in various other multi-sport events.

== History ==
=== History and etymology of the term 'wushu' ===
Traditional Chinese martial arts have existed for thousands of years. The earliest term for 'martial arts', which can be found in the Han history (206 BCE – 23 CE), was "military fighting techniques" (兵技巧; bīng jìqiǎo). During the Song period (circa 960 CE) the name changed to "martial arts" (武藝; Wǔ Yì). The term 'Wushu' ('Martial Arts') was also occasionally used. The term 'Wushu' was, for example, found in a poem by Cheng Shao (1626–1644) from the Ming dynasty. In 1928 the 'officially sanctioned' name was changed to "national arts" (國術; guóshù) when the National Martial Arts Academy was established in Nanjing. The term reverted to Wushu under the People's Republic of China during the early 1950s.

The word Wǔ (武) means "Martial" and is composed of two parts: "walk" or "stop" (止; zhǐ) and "lance" (戈; gē). The term wushu being used for 'martial arts' goes back as far as the Liang Dynasty (502–557) in an anthology compiled by Xiao Tong (d. 531), called "Selected Literature" (文選; Wénxuǎn). The term is found in the second verse of a poem by Yan Yanzhi titled: Huang Taizi Shidian Hui Zuoshi (皇太子釋奠會作詩).

The great man grows the many myriad things ...

Breaking away from the military arts,

He promotes fully the cultural mandates.

— Translation from Echoes of the Past by Yan Yanzhi (384–456)

=== History of the martial sport of wushu ===
Wushu, as a 'martial sport', was created by the Chinese Communist Party (CCP) in the 20th century. This was part of an over-arching social, cultural and political movement led by the Party, to modernize China as it saw fit. In 1958, the CCP government established an organization for martial arts training. The Chinese State Commission for Physical Culture and Sports led the creation of standardized forms for most of the major arts. During this period, a national wushu system that included standard forms, teaching curriculum, and instructor grading was established. Wushu was introduced at both the high school and university level. This new system sought to incorporate common elements from many styles and forms as well as the general ideas associated with Chinese martial arts. Stylistic concepts such as hard, soft, internal, and external, as well as classifications based on schools such as Shaolin, tai chi, Wudangquan, and others were all integrated into one system. Wushu became the government-sponsored standard for training in martial arts in China. The push for standardization continued leading to widespread adaptation.

In 1979, China's State Commission for Physical Culture and Sports created a special task force for teaching and practice of Wushu. In 1986, the Chinese National Research Institute of Wushu was established as the central authority for the research and administration of wushu activities in China. Changing government policies and attitudes towards sports in general led to the closing of the State Sports Commission (the central sports authority) in 1998. This closure is viewed as an attempt to partially de-politicize organized sports and move Chinese sports policies towards a more market-driven approach. As a result of these changing sociological factors within China, both traditional styles and modern wushu approaches are being promoted by the International Wushu Federation.

== Taolu ==
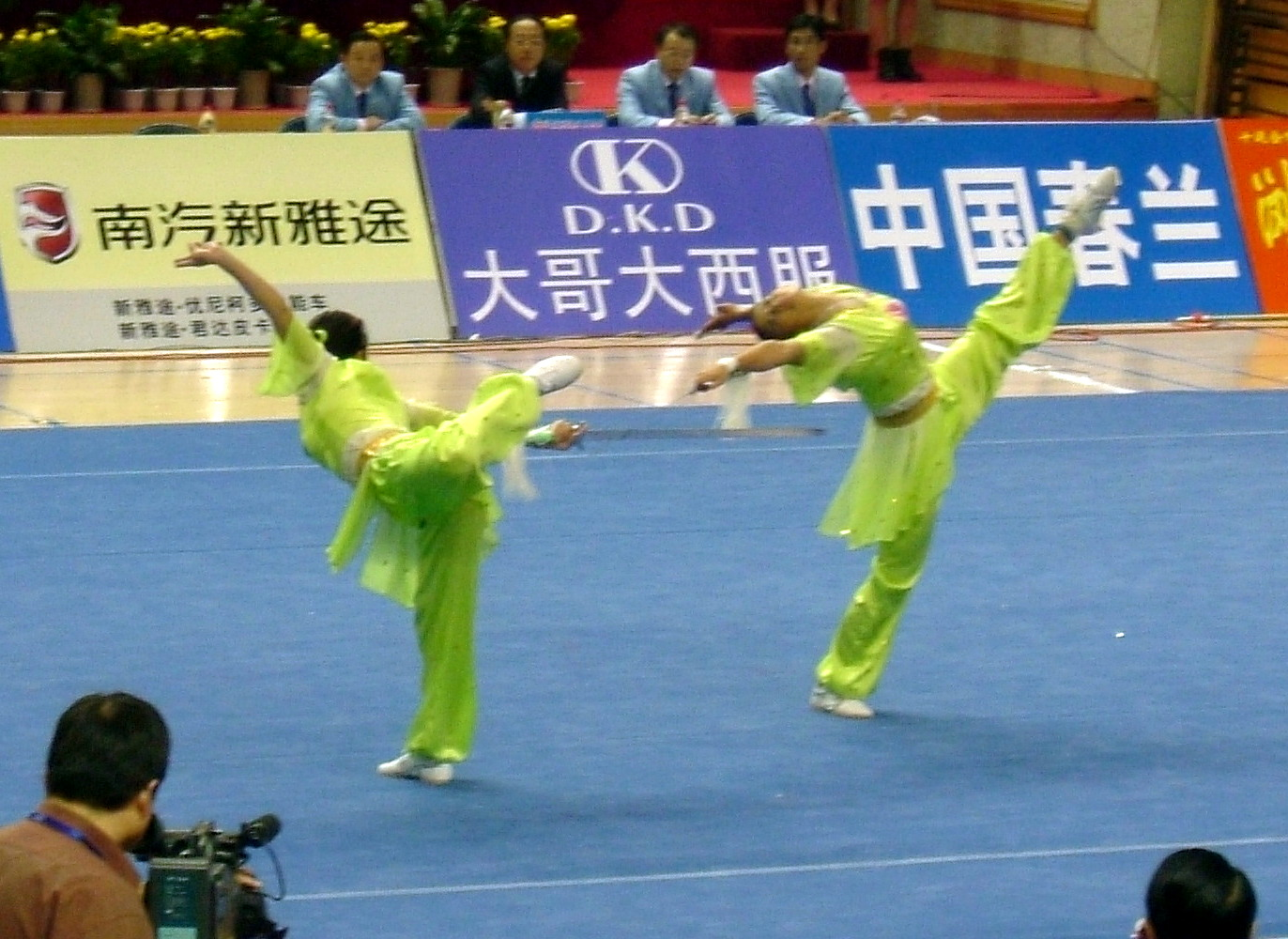
A jian dual event (choreographed)

Wushu events are performed using compulsory or "individual routines" or taolu (套路) in competition. Throughout the 1990s until 2005 for international competitions, athletes competed with routines that were choreographed by IWUF assigned coaches or athletes. In November 2003, a major revision in the taolu competition rules occurred: deduction content was standardized, judges' roles were organized and expanded, and the degree of difficulty component, also known as nandu (難度; difficulty movements), was added. This category is worth 2 points of the 10 total. The quality of movements category is worth 5 points, and the overall performance category is worth 3 points. These changes were first implemented at the 2005 World Wushu Championships, and individual routines have become standard where an athlete creates a routine with the aid of their coach while following certain rules for difficulty and technical requirements. Only the age group C and B athletes at the World Junior Wushu Championships still compete with compulsory routines at an international level. All junior events including group A athletes (which compete with individual routines), all traditional events, and all non-standard taolu events (i.e., Shuangdao, baguazhang, etc.), are judged without the degree of difficulty component.

In addition to events for individual routines, some wushu competitions also feature dual and group events. The dual event, also called duilian (對練), is an event in which there is some form of sparring with weapons or without weapons. The group event, also known as jiti (集體), requires a group of people to perform together and smooth synchronization of actions is crucial. Usually, the group event also allows instrumental music to accompany the choreography during the performance. The carpet used for the group event is also larger than the one used for individual routines. The 2019 World Wushu Championships was the first international wushu competition to feature such an event.

=== Barehanded ===
- Changquan (simplified Chinese: 长拳; traditional Chinese: 長拳; lit. 'Long fist') is an event derived from styles such as chaquan, huaquan, and Shaolin kung fu as well as other traditional styles. Changquan is the most popular and difficult of all wushu events, which requires great speed, power, accuracy, and flexibility. Most professional athletes in China start training in this style starting at a young age.
- Nanquan (Chinese: 南拳; lit. 'Southern fist') is an event derived from styles that originated in the southern regions of China such as Hung Ga, Choy Li Fut, Jow-Ga kung fu, and Wing Chun. Nanquan typically requires less flexibility and has less emphasis on acrobatics than changquan, but it also requires greater leg stability, speed, and power generation through leg, hip, and shoulder coordination.
- Tai chi as a wushu taolu event, is largely based on the Yang-style tai chi but also includes movements of the Chen, Wu, Wu (Hao), and Sun styles. Competitive contemporary tai chi is distinct from the traditional first form for styles it draws from, in that it typically involves difficult balances and jumps which require great balance, control, and flexibility. The tai chi event as well as other tai chi-based events are usually performed with musical accompaniment.

=== Short weapons ===
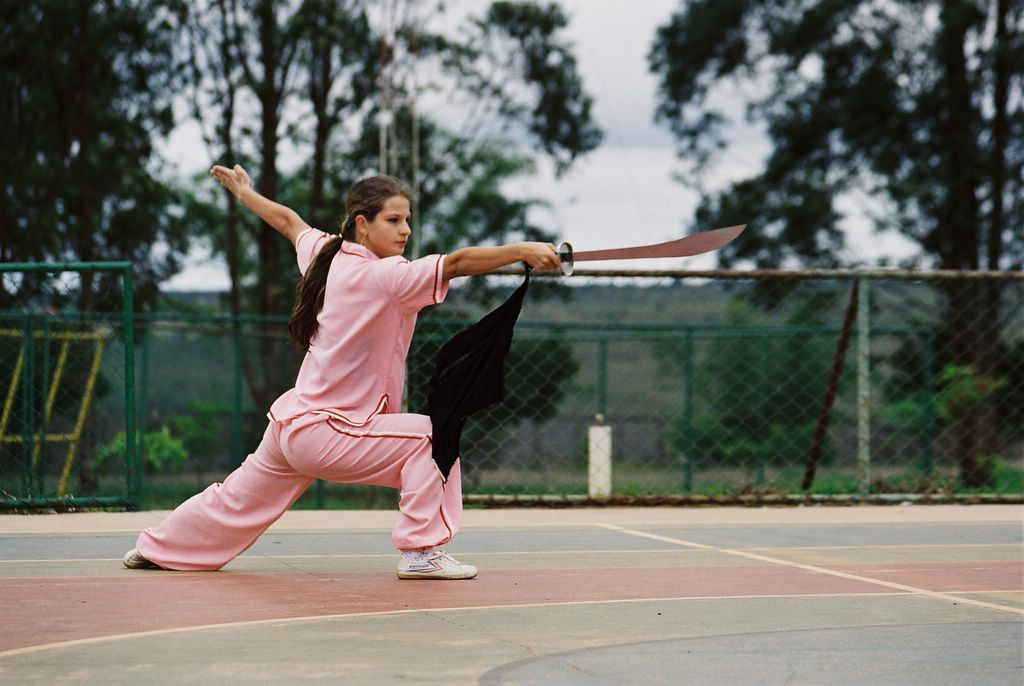
A dao

- Daoshu (simplified Chinese: 刀术; traditional Chinese: 刀術; lit. 'Broadsword') is an event that uses the dao using changquan methods of movement.
- Jianshu (simplified Chinese: 剑术; traditional Chinese: 劍術; lit. 'Straightsword') is an event that uses the jian using changquan methods of movement.
- Nandao (Chinese: 南刀; lit. 'Southern broadsword') was introduced into international wushu competition in 1999. The weapons and techniques are based on the butterfly swords of Wing Chun, a Southern style. The blade has been lengthened and modified so that a singular sword is used.
- Taijijian (simplified Chinese: 太极剑; traditional Chinese: 太極劍; lit. 'Tai chi straight sword') is an event that uses the jian based on traditional tai chi jian methods, such as the standardized 42 posture competition routine adapted primarily from Yang and Chen swordsmanship. This event was added to international competition in 1999.
- Taijishan (simplified Chinese: 太极扇; traditional Chinese: 太極扇; lit. 'Tai Chi fan') is an event that uses a Chinese hand fan with traditional tai chi methods. This event was created in 2019 ahead of Wushu's participation in the 2026 Summer Youth Olympics (originally scheduled for 2022), and so it has yet to debut in competition.

Under IWUF apparatus specifications for jianshu and daoshu, when the weapon is held vertically at the athlete's side with the guard resting in the palm, the blade tip must reach at least the top of the ear. Contemporary jianshu routines favor lightweight spring steel blades (typically around 0.7 to 0.9 lb or 300 to 400 g) rolled thin near the point so the foil flexes and snaps audibly during rapid changquan techniques and aerial jumps. By contrast, traditional taijijian training in Chen, Yang, and Wudang lineages employs a heavier, unsharpened steel practice jian (commonly forged in centers such as Longquan from martensitic stainless steel or high-carbon steel) built with a smooth flat blade profile and staged thickness taper: the lower two thirds near the guard remain rigid for structural alignment and deflections, while the front third is semi flexible and recovers straight without audible tip chatter. Proportioned to practitioner stature across 28 to 32 in (71 to 82 cm) blade lengths, traditional solo practice jian weigh around 1.30 to 1.39 lb (590 to 630 g) unscabbarded with a balance point around 2.4 to 3.5 in (6.0 to 9.0 cm) ahead of the guard, fitted with a solid hardwood scabbard (such as jichi wood) to support a relaxed wrist (鬆腕; sōng wàn) and tactile sensitivity (聽勁; tīngjìn).

=== Long weapons ===
- Gunshu (simplified Chinese: 棍术; traditional Chinese: 棍術; pinyin: Gùn shù; lit. 'Cudgel') is an event that uses a staff with changquan methods of movement. Staffs were traditionally made from white wax wood, but carbon fiber staff have become the standard in international competition since the 2010s since they are lighter and more durable.
- Qiangshu (simplified Chinese: 枪术; traditional Chinese: 槍術; pinyin: Qiāng shù; lit. 'Spear') is an event that uses a spear using changquan methods of movement. The shaft of the spear is generally more flexible and longer than what is used in the gunshu event.
- Nangun (Chinese: 南棍; pinyin: Nán gùn; lit. 'Southern cudgel') was introduced into international wushu competition in 1999. It uses a staff with nanquan methods of movement. The staff is generally much thicker and heavier than the one used in the gunshu event.

The majority of routines used in the sport are new, modernized recompilations of traditional routines. However, routines taken directly from traditional styles, including the styles that are not part of standard events, may be performed in competition, especially in China. Many of these styles though are events in the World Kung Fu Championships, another IWUF-run event that is exclusively for traditional styles of wushu. The more commonly seen routines include:

- Baguazhang (八卦掌) – Eight-Trigrams Palm
- Bajiquan (八極拳/八极拳) – Eight Extremes Fist/Boxing
- Chaquan (查拳) – Cha Fist/Boxing
- Chuojiao (戳腳/戳脚) – Poking Feet
- Ditangquan (地躺拳) – Ground-Prone Fist/Boxing
- Fanziquan (翻子拳) – Tumbling Fist/Boxing
- Houquan (猴拳) – Monkey Fist/Boxing
- Huaquan (華拳/华拳) – Hua Fist/Boxing
- Nanquan (南拳) – Southern Fist
- Pao Chui (炮捶) – Cannon Punch
- Piguaquan (劈掛拳) – Chop-Hitch Fist/Boxing
- Shequan (蛇拳) – Snake Fist/Boxing
- Tan Tui (弹腿) – Spring Kick
- Tang Lang (螳螂拳) – Praying Mantis Fist/Boxing
- Tongbeiquan (通背拳) – Through-the-Back Fist/Boxing
- Wing Chun (詠春拳/咏春拳) – Eternal Spring
- Xingyiquan (形意拳) – Shape-Intent Fist/Boxing
- Ying Zhao Pai (鷹爪拳/鹰爪拳) – Eagle Claw Fist/Boxing
- Zuiquan (醉拳) – Drunken Fist/Boxing

=== Traditional weapons routines ===
There is also a traditional weapons category, which often includes the following:

- Shuangshou jian (雙手劍/双手剑) – Two-Handed Sword
- Jiujiebian (九節鞭/九节鞭) – Nine Section Whip
- Sanjiegun (三節棍/三节棍) – Three Section Staff
- Shengbiao (繩鏢/绳镖) – Rope Dart
- Dadao (大刀) – Great Sword
- Pudao (撲刀/扑刀) – Horse Knife
- Emeici (峨嵋刺) – Emei Daggers
- Shuangdao (雙刀/双刀) – Double Broadsword
- Shuanggou (雙鈎/双钩) – Double Hook-sword
- Guai Shu (拐術/拐术) – Crutch / Walking Stick
- Fei Cha (飛叉/飞叉) – Flying Trident
- Da Chui (大錘/大锤) – Great Hammer

== Sanda ==
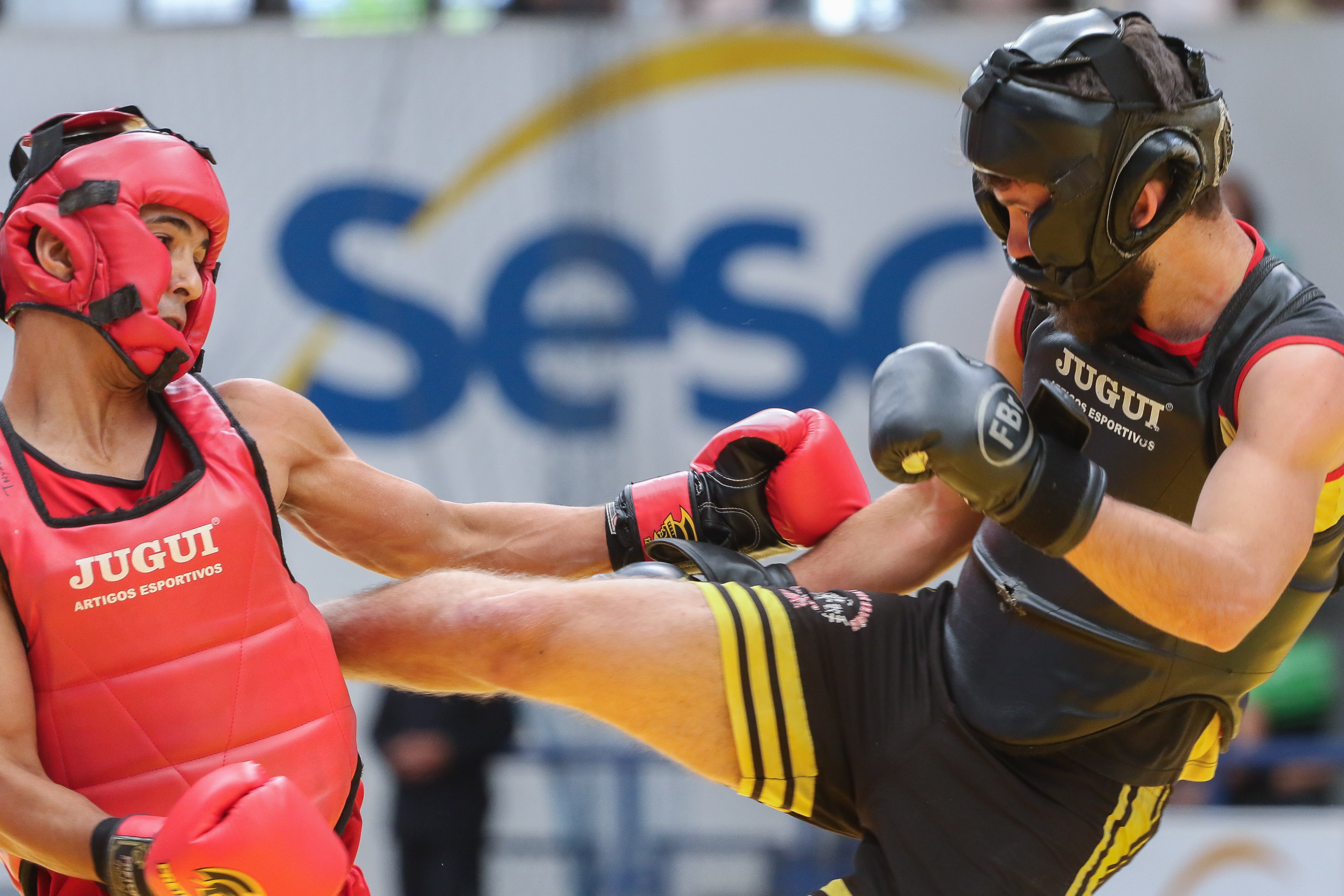
A wushu sanda match in Brazil

The other major discipline of contemporary Chinese wushu is known as sanda, yundong sanda (运动散打; yùndòng sǎndǎ, sport free-fighting), or jingzheng sanda (竞争散打; jìngzhēng sàndǎ, competitive free-fighting). Sanda is a fighting method, sport, and applicable component of wushu/kung fu influenced by traditional Chinese boxing, of which takedowns and throws are legal in competition, as well as all other sorts of striking (use of arms and legs). Chinese wrestling methods are called shuai jiao and other Chinese grappling techniques such as Chin Na. It has all the combat aspects of wushu.

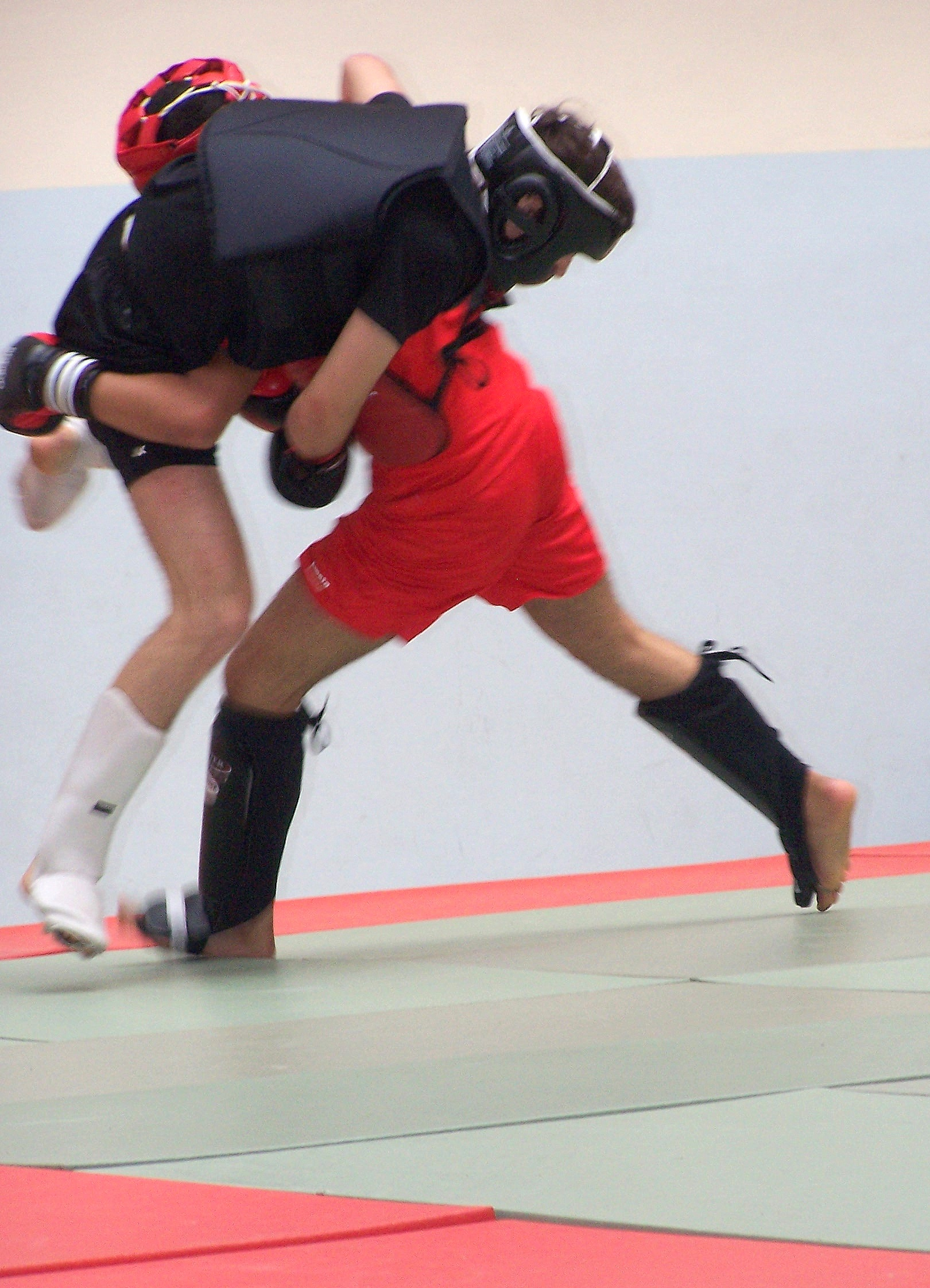
A takedown at a sanda match

Sanda appears much like kickboxing or Muay Thai but includes many more grappling techniques. Sanda fighting competitions are often held alongside taolu or form competitions. Sanda represents the modern development of lei tai contests but with rules in place to reduce the chance of serious injury. Many Chinese martial arts schools teach or work within the rule sets of sanda, working to incorporate the movements, characteristics, and theory of their style.

Chinese martial artists also compete in non-Chinese or mixed combat sports, including boxing, kickboxing, and mixed martial arts. Sanda is practiced in tournaments and is normally held alongside taolu events in wushu competitions. For safety reasons, some techniques from the self-defense form such as elbow strikes, chokes, and joint locks, are not allowed during tournaments. Competitors can win by knockout or points which are earned by landing strikes to the body or head, throwing an opponent, or when competition is held on a raised lei tai platform, pushing them off the platform. Fighters are only allowed to clinch for a few seconds. If the clinch is not broken by the fighters, and if neither succeeds in throwing his opponent within the time limit, the referee will break the clinch. In the U.S., competitions are held either in boxing rings or on the raised lei tai platform. Amateur fighters wear protective gear.

Amateur sanda allows kicks, punches, and throws. King of Sanda, a competition held in China, is held in a ring similar to a boxing ring in design but larger in dimension. Professionals wear no protective gear except for gloves, cups, and mouthpieces, and "professional sanda" allows knee and elbow strikes (including to the head) as well as kicking, punching, and throwing.

Some sanda fighters have participated in fighting tournaments such as K-1, Muay Thai, boxing, and Shoot Boxing. They have had some degree of success, especially in Shoot Boxing competitions, which is more similar to sanda. Due to the rules of kickboxing competition, sanda fighters are subjected to more limitations than usual. Also, notable competitors in China's mainstream mixed martial arts competitions, Art of War Fighting Championship, and Ranik Ultimate Fighting Federation are predominantly of wushu background. Sanda has been featured in many style-versus-style competitions. Muay Thai is frequently pitted against sanda as is karate, kickboxing, and taekwondo. Although it is less common, some sanda practitioners have also fought in publicly viewed American mixed martial arts competitions.

== Competitions ==
Major international and regional competitions featuring wushu include:

- World Wushu Championships
- World Junior Wushu Championships
- World Combat Games
- Asian Games
- National Games of China
- Southeast Asian Games

Wushu is not a Summer Olympic sport; the IWUF has repeatedly backed proposals for wushu to be added to the Olympic program, most recently as one of eight sports proposed for the 2020 Summer Olympics in Tokyo, Japan. However, it failed to reach the final shortlist, and the International Olympic Committee (IOC) ultimately voted for the re-inclusion of wrestling instead. Wushu was formally introduced into the Olympics as an exhibition sport in Berlin, in 1936, on Chancellor Hitler's request. In March 2015, IWUF executive vice president Anthony Goh stated that the Federation was planning to propose wushu again for the 2024 Summer Olympics. As part of new IOC rules allowing host committees to accept proposals for new sports to be added to the program (allowing the addition of sports of local interest to the Olympic program under an "event-based" model), in June 2015, wushu was shortlisted again as part of eight sports proposed for inclusion in the 2020 Games in this manner. However, it did not make the final shortlist of five. On 8 January 2020, it was announced by the IOC that Wushu will be added to the 2022 Summer Youth Olympics (which has been rescheduled to 2026).

Owing to its cultural significance in China, the IOC allowed the organizers of the 2008 Summer Olympics in Beijing to hold a wushu tournament in parallel with the Games as a separate event – the first time that the IOC has allowed such an event.

Wushu was also a demonstration sport at the 2014 Summer Youth Olympics at Nanjing, which featured events for Group A athletes who qualified at the World Junior Wushu Championships earlier that year. Wushu was also part of the 2014 Nanjing Sports Lab along with skateboarding, roller skating, and sports climbing.

=== Notable practitioners ===
==== Taolu ====
- Jet Li – multiple-time China national champion, internationally renowned movie star.
- Zhao Changjun – 8-time world champion and multiple-time China national champion.
- Yuan Wenqing – 9-time world champion known as the "Prince of Wushu."
- Liu Qinghua – 2-time world champion and first female "grand slam" holder.
- Lindswell Kwok – 5-time world champion known as the "Queen of Taiji" in Indonesia.
- Nguyễn Thúy Hiền – 7-time world champion known as the "Queen of Wushu" in Vietnam.
- Wu Jing – actor, martial artist, and director.
- Donnie Yen – martial artist and actor.
- Daniel Wu – martial artist and actor.
- Ray Park – actor most notable for his portrayal of Darth Maul in Star Wars: Episode I.

==== Sanda ====
- Muslim Salikhov – 5-time world champion, World Combat Games, and 2008 Beijing Wushu Tournament gold medalist in sanda, and UFC fighter.
- Cung Le – 3-time world championships medalist in sanda and UFC fighter.
- Zhang Weili – first Chinese fighter to win a UFC championship.
- Zabit Magomedsharipov – UFC fighter.

=== Criticism ===
Wushu has faced criticism as a competitive sport. It has been criticized by some traditional martial artists for being too commercialized, losing many of its original values, and potentially threatening old styles of teaching. Such critics argue that contemporary wushu helped to create a dichotomy between formwork and combat application.

== See also ==
- Kung fu
- Chinese martial arts
- Eighteen Arms of Wushu
- List of Chinese martial arts
- Wuxia
- Chinese culture
