= Bafaquan =

Chinese Martial Art

Bafaquan 八法拳
- Also known as: Eight Methods
- Focus: Striking, weapons training
- Country of origin: China
- Creator: Li De Mao
- Parenthood: Fanziquan, San Huang Pao Chui, Tán Tuǐ, Tongbeiquan, Xingyiquan
- Olympic sport: No

Ba Fa, or Eight Methods, is a Chinese martial art developed by Li De Mao (李德茂) during the Qing dynasty. He combined the techniques of Fanziquan (翻子), Paochui (炮捶), Tantui (弹腿), Tongbeiquan (劈挂) and Xingyiquan (形意) into a new style based on the theory of eight methods (八法). The eight methods are: outer trap, inner trap and stab, flick, support, shake, chop and reel. (攔、拿、扎、崩、托、抖、劈、纏) This style includes both single forms, pair training, as well as weapon training such as spear, saber and sword. Eight Methods Big Spear (Da Qiang, 大枪), also known as the Big Pole, is a specialty of this style. This technique first appeared in 1906, just before the Revolution of 1911. It combines the methods of the Yue-family spear (岳家槍), Pear-flower Spear (梨花槍) and Liuhe Spear (六合槍) with principles of the eight methods. It is also designed to work on foot or on horseback.

Ba Fa Quan is popular in regions such as Shanxi (山西), Datong (大同), Inner Mongolia (Nei Menggu 内蒙古) and Yuencheng City.
