= Taizuquan =

Martial art

Tàizǔquán (太祖拳, eng. Boxing of Tàizǔ or Great-Ancestor Fist) is a style of Chinese martial arts whose name refers to Emperor Tàizǔ of Sòng, the founder of the Sòng dynasty.

There are two distinct variations of Tàizǔquán, the Northern Style: Tàizǔ Zhǎngquán (Eng. Taizu Changquan), and the Southern Style: Nán Tàizǔquán. Tàizǔ Zhǎngquán styles are taught in Guǎngdōng. Nán Tàizǔquán is taught in Táiwān. Both styles are found in Fújiàn.

== Traditional Aphorisms ==
The essence of the style is to use the enemy's offense as means to control the enemy itself.

The routine moves are rigorous, the footwork is flexible, both firm and supple.

The practitioner is like a cat; shaking like a tiger, walking like a dragon, and moving like lightning.

It requires one courage, two strengths, three exercises, four breaths, five tricks, six changes, seven evils, and eight cruelties.

When attacking, check the situation and observe carefully; rush through the middle opening whenever weak, and step around when encountering a strong front.

The hands are connected with each other, up and down, attacking where there is a gap, and coming back together when there is a leak.

Focus on actual offense and defense. Like the wind, the shock is like electricity, the front hand is led, the back hand chases, and the two hands are exchanged.

The technique is either offensive or defensive, with the style's philosophy indicating that two are interchangeable.

== Tàizǔquán Zhǎngquán ==
According to Wu Bing and Liu Xiangyun, the Tàizǔ boxing method is the quintessential Shaolin (少 林 寺; Young Forest Temple) martial art (武 艺; Wǔyì) of the northern school, and is also called Taiziquan (太 子 拳).

Tàizǔquán has been associated with Zhǎngquán since the time of the Ming Dynasty because Ming general Qī Jìguāng (戚 繼 光) wrote "of the ancient and current families of boxing, the peaceful Taizu had thirty-six figures of Long Boxing".

Practitioners of this style are found in mainly in Láizhōu, Shāndōng.

=== Tàizǔquán Zhǎngquán Routines ===
This style of Zhǎngquán has the famous Sānshí'èr shì (三 十 二 势; 32 Techniques) mentioned in General Qī Jìguāng's Jìxiào xīnshū (紀 效 新 書; Eng. New Treatise on Military Efficiency).

Tàizǔ Zhǎngquán has 4 routines:

- Yīlù xiǎo zhàn quán (一 路 小 战 拳); 1st Road, Small Battle Fist
- Èrlù tài zhàn quán (二 路 太 战 拳); 2nd Road, Great Battle Fist
- Sānlù sàn zhàn quán (三 路 散 战 拳); 3rd Road, Three Battle Fist
- Sìlù hé zhàn quán (四 路 合 战 拳); 4th Road, Joined Battle Fist

== Tàizǔquán in Cāngzhōu ==
During the reign of the Kāngxī Emperor (1654–1722), Tàizǔquán was spread in the Cāngzhōu area of Héběi province.

The bare-hand routines:

- Yīlù tàizǔ quán (一 路 太 祖 拳) 1st Road, Great-Ancestor Fist
- Èrlù tàizǔ quán (二 路 太 祖 拳) 2nd Road, Great-Ancestor Fist
- Shí tàng bā luóhàn quán (十 趟 八 罗 汉 拳) 10 lines of 8 Arhats Fist
- Liú tuǐ jià (遛 腿 架) Walking Leg Frame
- Liú jiǎo shì (遛 脚 式) Walking Kick Technique
- Bā dǎ, èrshí shì (八 打 二 十 式) 8 Strikes of 20 Techniques
- Tàizǔ zhǎng quán (太 祖 长 拳) Great Ancestor Long Fist
- Xíng bù quán (行 步 拳) Line Walking Fist
- Shí'èr tàng dàntuǐ (十 二 趟 弹 腿) 12 Lines of Spring Legs

The routines with long weapons:

- Tàizǔ gùn (太 祖 棍) Great-Ancestor Staff
- Sānjié gùn (三 节 棍) 3-Section Staff
- Shàolín gùn (少 林 棍) Young Forest Staff
- Shí'èr lián qiāng (十 二 连 枪) 12 Linked Spear
- Méihuā qiāng (梅 花 枪) Plum Blossom Spear
- Sìmén dàdāo (四 门 大 刀) 4 Gate Cleaver
- Fāngbiàn chǎn (方 便 铲) Convenient Shovel
- Shuāngshǒu dài (双 手 带) Two Handed Sash

The routines with short weapons:

- Méihuā dāo (梅 花 刀) Plum Flower Saber
- Wàn shèng dāo (万 胜 刀) 10,000 Victories Saber
- Yìngzhàn dāo (应 战 刀) Answering Battle Saber
- Qīnglóng jiàn (青 龙 剑) Blue Dragon Sword
- Èr lǎng jiàn (二 朗 剑) Two Light Sword
- Shuāng yuè (双 钺) Double Axe
- Méihuā shuānggōu (梅 花 双 钩) Plum Flower Double Hook

The partner routines:

- Duìlián (对 连) Linked Pair
- Duìdǎ tàizǔ gùn (对 打 太 祖 棍) Paired Strike Great-Ancestor Staff
- Sānjié gùn jìn qiāng (三 节 棍 进 枪) 3-Section Staff Entering Spear
- Dāndāo jìn qiāng (单 刀 进 枪) Single Saber Entering Spear
- Dàdāo jìn qiāng (大 刀 进 枪) Cleaver Entering Spear
- Zǐmǔ chuí duìdǎ (子 母 锤 对 打) Mother & Son Hammers Paired Strike

== Nán Tàizǔquán ==
Southern tàizǔquán is particularly common in Taiwan.

The taolu or characteristic forms:

- Xiǎo sìmén (小 四 門) Small 4 Gates
- Dà sìmén (大 四 門) Large 4 Gates
- Wǔ bù (五 步) 5 Steps
- Fēi bāguà (飛 八 卦) Flying 8 Hexagrams
- Luóhàn quán (羅 漢 拳) Arhat Fist

The forms with weapons:

- Tàizǔ gùn (太 祖 棍) Great-Ancestor Staff
- Sìmén dàdāo (四 门 大 刀) 4 Gate Saber
- Méihuā dāo (梅 花 刀) Plum Blossom Saber
- Wànshèng dāo (万 胜 刀) 10,000 Victories Saber
- Shuāng dāo (双 刀) Double Saber
- Méihuā shuānggōu (梅 花 双 钩) Plum Flower Double Hooks
- Shí'èr lián qiāng (十 二 连 枪) 12 Linked Spear
- Méihuā qiāng (梅 花 枪) Plum Blossom Spear
- Máodùn (矛 盾) Spear & Shield
- Hǔchā (虎 叉) Tiger Fork
- Liúxíng chuí (遛 行 锤) Walking Hammers
- Fāngbiàn chǎn (方 便 铲) Convenient Shovel
- Jiujié biān (九 节 鞭) 9-Section Whip
- Shuāngshǒu dài (双 手 带) Two Handed Sash

The partner routines:

- Duìdǎ (對 打) Paired Strike
- Gùn duìdǎ (棍 對 打) Paired Staff
- Quán duì dāo (拳 對 刀) Fist vs Saber
- Hǔchā duì dāo (虎 叉 對 刀 ) Tiger Fork vs Saber
- Sānjiégùn jìn qiāng (三 节 棍 进 枪) 3-Section Staff Entering Spear
- Dāndāo jìn qiāng (单 刀 进 枪) Single Saber Entering Spear
- Dàdāo jìn qiāng (大 刀 进 枪) Cleaver Entering Spear
- Zǐmǔ chuí duìdǎ (子 母 锤 对 打) Mother & Son Hammers Paired Strike

== See also ==
- Tiandihui
- Southern Shaolin Monastery
- Changquan
- Chang Moo Kwan
- List of Chinese martial arts
