= Drunken boxing =

Chinese martial art

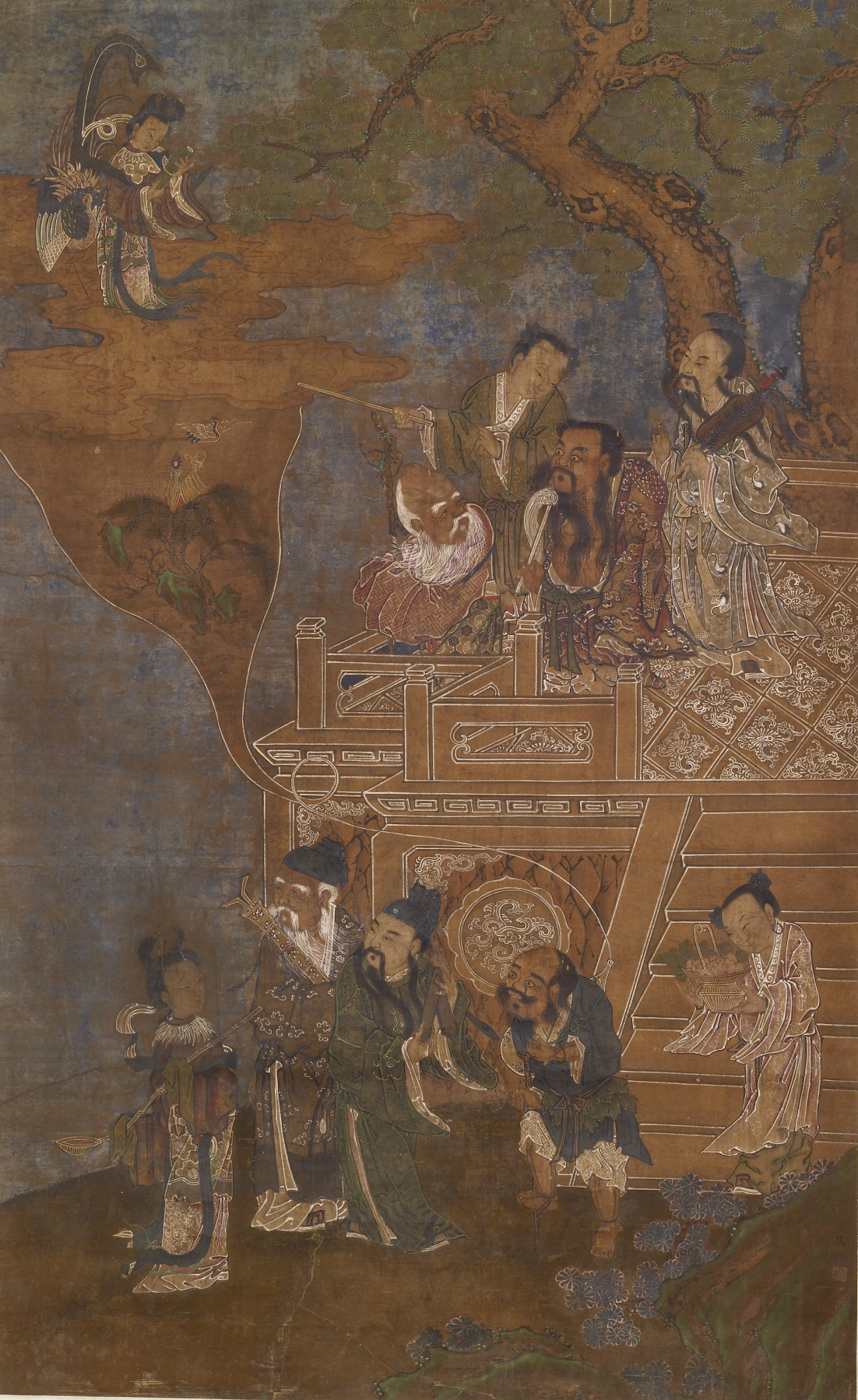
- The Eight Drunken Immortals
- Also known as: Zuiquan, Drunken Boxing, Drunken Arts, Drunken Fist, Drunken Style, Drunken Kungfu, Drunk-Fu, Drunken Eight Immortals Boxing, Drunken Luohan Boxing, Wine/Alcohol Boxing
- Focus: Feints and deception
- Country of origin: Greater China

Drunken boxing (Chinese: 醉拳; pinyin: zuì quán), also known as drunken fist, is a general name for various styles of martial arts that imitate the movements of a drunk person. It is an ancient style, and its origins are mainly traced back to the Buddhist and Daoist religious communities. The Buddhist style is related to the Shaolin Temple, while the Daoist style is based on the Daoist tale of the drunken Eight Immortals. Drunken boxing has the most unusual body movements among all styles of Chinese martial arts. Hitting, grappling, locking, dodging, feinting, ground and aerial fighting, and all other sophisticated methods of combat are incorporated.

== History ==
Due to a scarcity of historical sources, it is nearly impossible to pinpoint the time or place of drunken boxing's origin or to trace a credible lineage of teachers and students between drunken boxing's earlier documentation and present-day practice. Drunken boxing probably appeared and disappeared in different places and at different times, with little more than common cultural and martial arts context to relate the different cases of drunken boxing with each other.

=== Written records ===
The earliest written reference to drunken boxing is probably in the classic novel Water Margin, in which the Song dynasty rebel Wu Song is depicted as a master of drunken boxing.

In the kung fu manual "Boxing Classic" (拳經; quán jīng) from the 18th century, Shaolin monks are described as practicing the style of eight drunken immortals boxing. This style is described as a technical derivative of ditangquan.

=== Unwritten records ===
The bayingquan (八影拳; Bāyǐngquán) lineage from Henan attributes its wine boxing to the Shaolin Kung Fu style.

Hung Ga lineages stemming from Wong Fei-hung attribute their drunken boxing to So Chan.

== Styles ==
Drunken boxing is not a single martial art with an established lineage and hierarchy but rather a group of loosely related kung fu styles. In this respect drunken boxing could also be understood as a phenomenon within kung fu. Furthermore, drunken boxing rarely appears as a complete and independent system but rather as an advanced feature within a broader system. A martial art may include a few drunken boxing techniques, one or more drunken boxing forms, a complementary drunken boxing fighting tactic, or a more developed drunken boxing sub-system. A great variety of kung fu schools have drunken styles, but the two major schools are the Buddhist and Taoist styles:

=== Buddhist style ===
Creation of the Buddhist style of Drunken boxing is attributed to Shaolin temple. At the beginning of the Tang dynasty (618–907 AD), 13 monks from the Shaolin temple intervened in a great war to help Li Shimin against rebel forces. The role of the monks was prominent so Li Shimin, as the next emperor, appreciated the monks' help and bestowed on them officialdom, land, and wealth. In ceremony of the victory, he sent the temple a gift of meat and wine. Because of the emperor's permission, the monks could abandon the Buddhist rule of not consuming meat and wine. This happened around 621 AD and since then, some Shaolin monks have consumed wine.

According to some, the drunken style was first introduced in the Song dynasty (960–1279 AD). It is said that a famous martial artist named Liu Qizan accidentally killed a person and sought refuge in Shaolin to avoid trial and to repent. Despite his monastic vows he still continued drinking wine. This was not tolerable by the monks, and they wanted to expel him from the temple. When completely drunk after consuming a huge amount of wine, Liu defied and beat the monks, some say more than 30 of them. The abbot, after seeing this, praised Liu's skill. This drunken style of combat was adopted from him by the monks and refined over the generations.

The most important Buddhist icons in Shaolin kung fu are Arhats, known in Chinese as Luohans. The same holds for the drunken style as a part of Shaolin kung fu, in which the main character is the drunken luohan. Drunken luohan methods in Shaolin kung fu do not appear only in drunken boxing but in some other styles as well. For example, in Shaolin luohan quan a drunken luohan steps forward, in Shaolin 18 luohan quan one of the 18 characters is a drunken luohan, and in Shaolin mad-devil staff a drunken luohan sways to the sides with disorderly steps.

As with other Shaolin styles, Shaolin drunken boxing is not a complete stand-alone system itself, but it consists of a few barehanded and weapon forms which together with other forms and styles comprise the whole system of Shaolin quan. Every lineage of Shaolin monks may have one or two barehanded and one or a few weapon forms of drunken boxing. The main weapon is the drunken staff, but other weapons such as the drunken sword are also practiced. Though the technical contents are almost the same, the drunken forms of varying lineages are different and their historical sources are mostly unclear.

=== Taoist style ===
The Taoist style of drunken boxing imitates the characters of the "Drunken Eight Immortals" (八仙; ba xian), which are a group of legendary immortals in Chinese mythology. First described in the Yuan dynasty, they were probably named after the Eight Immortal Scholars of the Han. Most of them are said to have been born in the Tang or Song dynasty. They are revered by Taoists and are also a popular element in the secular Chinese culture. In drunken kung fu the eight immortals are used as martial archetypes, or as eight sub-styles of drunken kung fu. Each immortal has his or her own strategy and mindset. This style is a complete system itself comprising eight forms, each representing one of the eight immortal characters:

1. Lü Dongbin, the leader of the Eight Immortals with a sword on his back that dispels evil spirits, swaying back and forth to trick the enemy, the drunk with internal strength.
2. Li Tieguai, Li the Cripple walks with an iron cane, feigns the weakness of having just one leg to win the fight with one powerful leg.
3. Han Zhongli, the strongest immortal, carries a large cauldron of wine, tackles the enemies with strength.
4. Lan Caihe, sexually ambiguous, carries a bamboo basket, attacking the enemies with swaying waist, mostly feminine postures.
5. Zhang Guolao, old man Zhang, donkey rider, with his entertaining postures on the donkey, and his donkey's lethal swift double kicks.
6. Cao Guojiu, the youngest immortal, a clever, controlled fighter, locks and breaks the joints (擒拿; qin na), attacks the deadly soft parts of the enemy body (点穴; dian xue).
7. Han Xiangzi, flute-playing immortal, denying and countering enemy attacks with powerful wrists.
8. He Xian'gu, Miss He, flirting with the enemy to cover her short-range attacks, evading enemy attacks with a twisting body.

These elements combine to form a complete fighting art. This style also has several weapon forms. The main weapon is the drunken sword, but other weapons such as the staff are also used.

=== Other styles ===
==== Southern fist ====
- Some Hung Ga lineages include one set of drunken boxing. Wong Fei-hung's unique status as a culture hero along with his numerous depictions in popular culture were influential in disseminating drunken boxing into public consciousness.
- Some Choy Li Fut lineages include one set of drunken boxing.
- Hak Fu Mun includes one set of drunken boxing.

==== Northern fist ====
- The most popular form of drunken fist practiced today is probably the modern Wushu taolu called drunken fist. Wushu taolu are based on traditional kung fu taolu. Wushu differs from traditional kung fu in its emphasis on visual aesthetics, as opposed to combative effectiveness, and in its pedagogic structure. Wushu drunken fist is generally more acrobatic and dramatized than traditional drunken boxing, with the player visually mimicking a drunkard. Many references to drunken boxing in popular culture resemble Wushu drunken boxing.
- Bayingquan may incorporate the most extensive drunken component (called wine/alcohol fist) in existing traditional kung fu, with a developed training curriculum, weapons, movement and fighting theory, etc., making it a virtually stand-alone style.
- Eagle Claw includes one set of drunken boxing.
- Some Qi Xing Tanglang Quan lineages include at least one set of drunken boxing.
- Fu Zhensong system includes an eight drunken immortals staff set.

There are Northern and Southern versions of drunken monkey boxing, which is related to drunken boxing.

== Technique ==
Drunken boxing is internal in nature and emphasizes the role of jin. Movement is initiated in the dantian area and continues through the body distally toward the hands and feet. The musculature is kept as soft as possible.

Movement in drunken boxing is relatively unique among martial arts in the frequency and degree to which it deviates from vertical posture, with the torso bent and twisted in all directions. The default hand position is the "cup holding fist", which is a softly held semi-open fist that uses the knuckles to strike and the tips of the fingers to grab. Other hand positions are used as well, among them the phoenix-eye single-knuckle fist.

=== Combat ===
Many aspects of drunken boxing are specialized toward deception: continuous bobbing and weaving and slipping, feigning instability and lack of focus, attacking from unusual angles and seemingly weak positions, sudden changes of momentum, compounding multiple attacks with the same limb, use of blindspots and visual distractions, changing game plans in mid-fight, and employing concealed or improvised weapons.

Like many styles of kung fu, drunken boxing employs a wide variety of attacks, including striking, chin na and wrestling, with trapping range fighting as a default skill. Strikes and grabs are alternated with the hands striking as they extend toward the enemy and grabbing as they retract. The power for grabs is sometimes generated by dropping the body, either through slightly lifting the feet off the ground and then stomping down with the weight of the entire body or by falling to the prone position.

Some styles of drunken boxing use traditional kung fu weapons, often the jiàn or gùn. The Bayingquan wine boxing system includes many weapons, including saber, spear, Guandao, flute, fan, gourd bottle, sash, sash tied to guard, and more.
