= Changquan =

Group of Chinese martial arts

Changquan 長拳
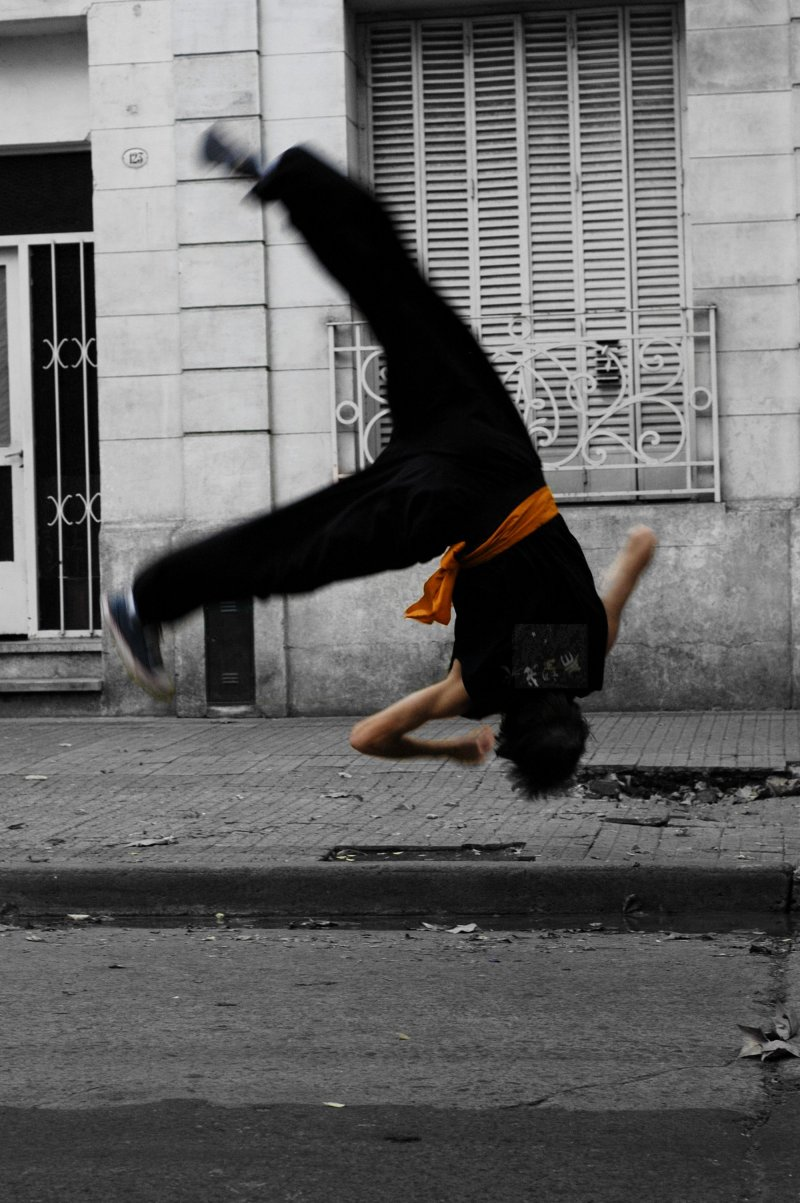
- A man doing cekongfan (侧空翻; "side somersault"), a common move in changquan.
- Also known as: Long Fist
- Focus: Striking, weapons training
- Country of origin: China
- Creator: Zhao Kuangyin
- Famous practitioners: (see notable practitioners)
- Parenthood: San Huang Pao Chui; Fanziquan; Huaquan; Taizu changquan; Hongquan
- Descendant arts: Sanshou, Northern Praying Mantis
- Olympic sport: Wushu (sport)

Changquan (/tʃɑːŋ.tʃuən/) (simplified Chinese: 长拳; traditional Chinese: 長拳; pinyin: chángquán; lit. 'Long Fist') refers to a family of external (as opposed to internal) martial arts (kung fu) styles from northern China.

The forms of the Long Fist style emphasize fully extended kicks and striking techniques, and by appearance would be considered a long-range fighting system. In some Long Fist styles, it is said "the best defense is a strong offense," in which case the practitioner launches a preemptive attack so aggressive that it deprives the opponent of the opportunity to attack. Others emphasize defense over offense, noting that nearly all techniques in Long Fist forms are counters to attacks. Long Fist uses large, extended, circular movements to improve overall body mobility in the muscles, tendons, and joints. Advanced Long Fist techniques include qin na joint-locking techniques and shuai jiao throws and takedowns.

The Long Fist style is considered to contain a good balance of hand and foot techniques, but in particular it is renowned for its impressive acrobatic kicks. In demonstration events, Long Fist techniques are most popular and memorable for their whirling, running, leaping, and acrobatics. Contemporary changquan moves are difficult to perform, requiring great flexibility and athleticism.

Long Fist's arsenal of kicks covers everything from a basic front snap-kick to a jumping back-kick, from a low sweep to a whirlwind-kick. Specifically, typical difficulty movements in modern changquan include the whirlwind kick, the butterfly kick, the cekongfan ('side somersault'), and the lotus kick.

== History ==
The core of changquan is attributed to the 10th century Emperor Taizu, the founding emperor of the Song dynasty. His style was allegedly called taizu changquan, which means "the Long Fist style of Emperor Taizu." That said, these texts can only be reliably dated to the second half of the 19th century. The Long Fist of contemporary wǔshù draws on Chaquan, "flower fist" Huāquán, Pao Chui, and "red fist" (Hongquan).

Widely perceived to have a strong Shaolin influence, traditional Long Fist was promoted at the Nanjing Guoshu Institute by Han Qing-Tang, a famous Long Fist and qin na expert. After the defeat of Chiang Kai-shek and subsequent closing of the institute, the new People's Republic of China created contemporary wushu, a popular artistic sport inspired largely by traditional Long Fist. However, this new evolution of changquan differed from the old style in that it was exhibition-focused. Higher, more elaborate jump kicks and lower stances were adopted, in order to create more aesthetically pleasing forms. Applications were then reserved for the sport of sanshou, which was kept somewhat separate from the taolu (forms). In 2005, with the creation of difficulty movements criteria in international competition, there has been a continued attention to jumps.

== Subtypes of Long Fist ==
- Pao Chui pre-Tang dynasty;
- Mizongyi Tang dynasty;
- Chaquan Tang dynasty;
- Huaquan Tang dynasty.
- Taizu changquan Song dynasty;
- Fanziquan Song dynasty;
- Hongquan ("red fist") Song dynasty;

== Sample Long Fist curriculum from Han Chin Tang Lineage ==
Northern Shaolin Long Fist Kung Fu Includes:

1. Barehand Forms
2. Weapons
3. Qin Na Dui Da (Joint Locking skills & sets)
4. Two Man Fighting Routines
5. Self Defense Applications
6. Iron Palm Training (Internal)

=== Hand forms ===
1. Lian Bu Quan - Consecutive Linking Step Fist
2. Gong Li Quan or Power Fist Form
3. Tan Tui or Springing Legs
4. Yi Lu Mai Fu or First Road of Ambush
5. Er Lu Mai Fu or Second Road of Ambush
6. Shi Zi Tang or Crossing Sequence
7. Xiao Hu Yan or Little Tiger Swallow
8. San Lu Pao or Three Ways of Running
9. Taizu Chuangquan
10. Si Lu Cha Quan or Fourth Way of Cha's Fist
11. Si Lu Ben Za or Four Way of Running and Smashing
1. 20 Methods Fighting Form or Er Shi Fa Quan
2. Duan Da Quan - Fighting In Close Quarters Boxing/Short Hit Boxing
3. Hua Quan - First Set Of China Fist Yi Lu Xi Yue
4. Hua Quan 2 - Second Set Of China Fist Er Lu Xi Yue
5. Hua Quan 3 - Third Set Of China Fist San Lu Xi Yue
6. Hua Quan 4 - Fourth Set Of China Fist Si Lu Xi Yue
7. Hua Quan 2 2 Man - Second Set Of China Fist Two Man Fighting Set Er Lu Xi Yue
8. Hua Quan 4 2 Man - Fourth Set Of China Fist Two Man Fighting Set Si Lu Xi Yue

==== Hand forms explained ====
- Lian Bu Quan - Consecutive Linking Step Fist: the most basic Shaolin Long Fist form containing over 70 applications.
- Gong Li Quan or Power Fist Form: the second basic form using dynamic tension at the end of each technique which develops muscles and tendons. Contains over 70 applications.
- Tan Tui or Springing Legs: due to their fast and accurate spring-like kicks, and they have a long history in China. The routines were popularly practiced by Northern Chinese martial arts society between 1736 and 1912. It improves fighting skills, balance, strength, and focus. These 12 routines form the basis for other, more complex forms practiced in Northern Shaolin Kung Fu.
- Yi Lu Mai Fu and Er Lu Mai Fu, the first and second Ways of Ambush, are fundamental sequences that instruct subtle methods of defense and attack. Both contain practical and effective escape and withdrawal techniques. They are intermediate forms that are considered the "foundation" of Long Fist. Contains subtle techniques designed to trick opponents.
- Shi Zi Tang builds on earlier sequences with the addition of several different kicks, side door attacks, and forceful techniques.
- Xiao Hu Yan is a challenging sequence combining techniques from Long Fist and Northern Praying Mantis. Xiao Hu Yan emphasizes low stances, powerful kicks, leg sweeps, trapping, and striking.
- San Lu Pao means "Three Ways of Running." It is the first advanced Long Fist sequence. San Lu Pao focuses on the fluid integration of speed and power through several hand and leg techniques, while also pushing the practitioner's endurance and sense of their enemy.
- Taizu Chuangquan was created by Emperor Taizu in the Song dynasty (960–976 A.D.). It is an advanced sequence that develops a student's knowledge in Long Fist fighting techniques while specifically training a combination of rooting, balance, and power.
- Si Lu Cha Quan means "Fourth Way of Cha's Fist." It is one of the more well-known Chaquan sequences in Long Fist. When practiced with a proper sense of enemy, root, speed, and power, it is very effective for training higher level techniques in long range fighting.
- Si Lu Ben Za means "Four Way of Running and Smashing." It is considered one of the most difficult and most advanced sequences created in Long Fist. Training it will lead a student to the highest level of Long Fist techniques.

=== Stances used in the system ===
1. Ma Bu (Horse Stance)
2. Deng Shan Bu/Gong Jian Bu (Mountain Climbing Stance/Bow and Arrow Stance)
3. Jin Ji Du Li (Golden Rooster Standing on One Leg Stance)
4. Xuan Ji Bu (False/Cat Stance)
5. Zuo Pan Bu (Crossed-Leg Stance)
6. Fu Hu Bu (Flat Stance)
7. Si-Liu Bu (Four-Six Stance)
8. Tun Bu - similar to False Stance, but with toes up and heel on the ground
9. Half Horse Stance (Lead foot turned forward)

=== Weapons training ===
1. Long Staff (Gun)
2. Broadsword (Dao)
3. Double Edge Sword
4. Spear (Qiang)
5. Chain/Nine Section Whip (Bian)
6. Dragon Phoenix Sword
7. Umbrella
8. Straight Sword (Jian)
9. Double Sword (Shuang Jian)
10. Double Broadsword (Shuang Dao)
11. Pudao
12. Meteor Hammer
13. Hook Sword

== Notable practitioners ==
- Bao Xian Fei
- Alfred Hsing
- Jia Rui
- Zahra Kiani
- Jet Li
- Li Yi
- Edgar Xavier Marvelo
- Vincent Ng
- Daria Tarasova
- Dennis To
- Dương Thúy Vi
- Jade Xu
- Đàm Thanh Xuân
- Yuan Xiaochao
- Yuan Wenqing
- Zhao Qingjian
- Hao Zhihua
- Chris Yen
- Laurent Buson
- Yoon Byung-in
- Donnie Yen
- Mark Musashi

== See also ==
- Northern Shaolin (martial art)
