= Lotus kick =

The lotus kick (Chinese: 腾空飞脚; pinyin: téng kōng fēi jiǎo; lit. 'flying jump kick'), also known as the jump outside or téng kōng bǎi lián, is a popular jump in modern wushu taolu.

== Execution ==
=== Running ===
The jump involves performing an outside kick (bǎi lián pāi jiǎo) in the air while spinning. The original method, seen in early modern changquan routines, includes a running setup into a jump on the right leg. While the right leg pushes upwards, the left leg either bends into a knee-raised position or to an extended position. During this, the right leg performs the outside kick in the air. After the kick, the performer has the option to either land on the left leg first or with both legs at the same time. In traditional changquan, it is typically used as a long-range attack, much like a tornado kick.

=== Standing ===
The modern lotus kick includes a stationary setup where the jump is executed evenly on both legs. The outside kick is still executed with the right leg, but the body position during the spin in the air is much more compact compared to the running method. Due to this, advanced practitioners may increase the difficulty of the move by rotating greater than 360°, usually 540° or 720° which is present in international competition. In the World Wushu Championships, the Lotus Kick is a Difficulty Technique for changquan, nanquan, and taijiquan events with standardized connections, criteria, and deduction content.

== Variations ==
=== Running ===
- Running Lotus Kick to standing
- Running Lotus Kick to Gōng Bù
- Running Lotus Kick to Zuò Pán
- Running Lotus Kick to Diē Shù Chā (front falling splits)

=== Standing ===
- Lotus kick 360° to Mǎ Bù
- Lotus kick 360° to Gōng Bù
- Lotus kick 360° to Pū Bù
- Lotus Kick 360°to Tí Xī Dú Lì (knee-raised position)
- Lotus Kick 360° to Zuò Pán
- Lotus Kick 360° to Diē Shù Chā
- Lotus Kick 540° to Mǎ Bù
- Lotus Kick 540° to Pū Bù
- Lotus Kick 540° to Tí Xī Dú Lì
- Lotus Kick 720° to Mǎ Bù
