= Luohanquan =

Group of Chinese martial arts

Luohanquan (simplified Chinese: 罗汉拳; traditional Chinese: 羅漢拳; pinyin: Luóhànquán; Wade–Giles: Lo-han ch'üan; Jyutping: lo4 hon3 kyun4), which means "Arhat fist", is a general name for all the styles of Chinese martial arts that are named after the Arhats, the holy Buddhist figures. Luohan style is the oldest and the representative style of Shaolin kung fu. The original roots of Luohan style date back to the early eras of Shaolin temple. In Shaolin temple, there are various Luohan styles. Besides the Shaolin Luohan styles, there are many Luohan-related styles that have been developed in many other areas of China. Shaolin Luohan 18 hands and Luohanquan are always praised as the root styles based on which most of the Shaolin kung fu styles and many other non-Shaolin styles have been created.

== Luohan and Shaolin ==
Enlightenment (Nirvana) is one of the first concepts of Buddhism. The name Luohan, the Chinese equivalent of the Sanskrit (Indian) word Arahat, refers to those who have achieved enlightenment. Therefore, the ultimate goal of the monks of Shaolin temple, in particular, has always been to reach the level of becoming Luohans. Therefore, the Luohan(s) have always been holy icon(s) in the daily life and martial art of Shaolin temple monks. As far as related to Shaolin temple martial arts, the names Luohanquan and Shaolin quan are often considered synonyms and therefore interchangeable.

== Luohan's 18 hands ==
There are various Luohan's 18 hands styles. These are the most important ones:

=== Shaolin Luohan's 18 hands ===
Based on Buddhist teachings, by observing and imitating the forms and expressions of Arhat statues in the temple, meditation and practice, those ancient exercises later evolved into a combat form called "18 hands of Luohan" (罗汉十八手; luóhàn shíbā shǒu), which is the oldest documented, systematized style of Shaolin kung fu. According to the historical official text of Shaolin temple, "Shaolin Kung Fu Manual" (少林拳谱; Shàolínquán Pǔ), in the Sui dynasty (581-618 AD) Shaolin monks had a selected set of 18 simple movements; until the Tang dynasty (618-907 AD) the set had developed into 18 martial postures, that were combined into a form (套路; tàolù); the number of the postures increased to 36 until the early Song dynasty (960 AD); and in the Jin-Yuan dynasty (1115-1368 AD) it was developed into 173 movements; finally, in the Ming dynasty the system of the 18 hands of Luohan was completed in 18 forms, each form having 18 postures, making a total of 324 postures. In Shaolin, this style is called "inborn Luohan's 18 hands" (先天罗汉十八手; xian tian luo han shi ba shou), because it was the style with which Shaolin kung fu was born. Monk Shi Deqian, in his efforts to document Shaolin martial arts collected 8 forms of the 18 hands of Luohan into his "Encyclopedia of Shaolin martial arts". Of these forms, most lineages of Shaolin monks have mostly kept only one form, mostly the first, or the eighth form. Shaolin Luohan's 18 hands movements are simple and straight. The methods are mostly done by the palms of the hands. Fists, hook hands, and other hand gestures and kicks are less used. Luohan's 18 hands are considered the elementary forms in Shaolin kung fu.

=== Shaolin/Huaquan Luohan's 18 hands ===
There is another Luohan's 18 hands style which is different from the original Shaolin Luohan's 18 hands but is more famous. This Luohan's 18 hands style has 18 different methods, consisted of 6 different methods of fist, 1 method of elbow, 2 methods of palm, 4 methods of leg, and 5 methods of joint locking. Of these 18 methods, a form of 24 movements for attack and defense is developed, which can be performed as a solo form or as a duet form. This style is originally from the Huaquan style of Shandong province, was brought to the Louyang area of Henan Province (close to Shaolin Temple) and was later adopted into the Shaolin curriculum, along with its sister set Babulian Huanquan.

=== Grandmaster Chen Qi Ming’s Shaolin 18 Luohan's Hands ===
This style is popularly transliterated into English as “Shaolin Eighteen Lohan Palm” and is currently carried forward by Neil Ripski and Dr Chen Qi Ming’s family. It originated in Southern Shaolin temple in the Sung Mountains.

However, Dr. Chen taught that from the 1700s to the 1960s, this lineage passed through the Himalayas via Tibetan monasteries, eventually returning to Guangzhou. After Dr. Chen healed Lama Tenzin—a Tibetan monk that was passing through Guangzhou to exchange knowledge with local Buddhists—Lama Tenzin passed this lineage of Eighteen Lohan to Dr. Chen. This lineage is a complete cultivation system that includes internal Chinese martial arts, qigong, shen gong, meditation, and neigong. PhD in Tibetan philosophy Dr. Jared Jones confirms this lineage also appears to have elements typical of Tibetan Tantric practice, like deity yoga and Phowa practice.

=== Shaolin Guard the Mountain of Child Gate Luohan's 18 hands ===
Guard the Mountain of Child Gate Luohan's 18 hands (护山子门罗汉十八手; Hù shānzi mén luóhàn shíbā shǒu) is a less known Luohan's 18 hands style. This style has 32 movements, which in total make 18 postures.

=== Shaolin Luohan's 18 hands of Dengfeng area ===
There is another less known Luohan's 18 hands style that has been passed down by Li Gensheng (李根生), a famous master from Dengfeng county near Shaolin. The 18 movements of this style are very similar to the first form of one version of Shaolin 18 Luohanquan. These kinds of movements are also used in the Tong Bi quan style of the western courtyard of Shaolin temple.

== Luohanquan styles ==
There are various Luohanquan styles. These are the most important ones:

=== Shaolin Luohanquan ===
Luohanquan is considered a completely pure Buddhist Shaolin style. It is the most famous, and of the most important styles of Shaolin kung fu. Shaolin monks developed Luohanquan as an advanced style based on the 18 hands of Luohan. Luohanquan has been created in the early ages of Shaolin temple, but it was first officially documented by Shaolin monks in the "Shaolin Kung Fu Manual" in the early years of the Song dynasty in 960s AD. This style has two forms called "small" and "big" Luohanquan, which are considered the oldest excellent styles of Shaolin temple. Small Luohanquan has 27 postures/36 movements and big Luohanquan has about 36 postures/54 movements. Big Luohanquan is traditionally called "golden child small Luohanquan" (金童小罗汉拳; jin tong xiao luo han quan).

Shaolin small and big Luohanquan are also practiced by the folk people of Dengfeng area around Shaolin in a less Luohan-imitative version, which drops out or simplifies the Luohan-imitating postures of the original Shaolin Luohanquan. They have extended the big Luohanquan with an additional part to make it 3 parts. Shi Deyang, 31st generation Shaolin monk talks about 6 forms of big Luohanquan, but most people only know these 3 parts.

Shaolin Luohanquan movements, though simple, are highly advanced and deceptive. Attack and defense are masked by Luohan Buddhist postures and come out from unlikely angles.

=== Shaolin 18 Luohanquan ===
During the centuries, Luohanquan was developed. A major contribution was by monk Jue Yuan and two others named Li Sou and Bai Yufeng. Finally, as a result of the developments since the Jin and Yuan dynasties until the middle and late Ming dynasty, a Luohanquan system of 18 forms was created, one form for each one of the famous Luohans, which at those times had increased in number to 18 in Chan Buddhism. In this style, each Luohan form is divided into 3 sections, so it has 54 sections in total. This style is less imitative than small and big Luohanquan styles and has given up or, at least, transformed many of the famous Luohan-imitating postures. 18 Luohanquan, though very famous, is rarely known. Even inside Shaolin, only a few people in each generation inherit this style completely. There are different versions of 18 Luohanquan. One version has 18 forms for the 18 Luohans, while there are other versions with 9 long forms which altogether represent 18 Luohan characters. As an estimation of the diversity, just notice that Shaolin monk Shi Degen (1914-1970) taught 3 seemingly different versions to 3 of his disciples, Liu Zhenhai, Shi Yongwen, and Zhu Tianxi.

=== Shaolin Luohan's 108 methods of combat ===
The "108 combat methods of Arhat" is a set of 108 fighting methods of hitting and grappling (throwing, locking, and take-downs), which have been created and developed by Shaolin monks of various generations. There are also a few smaller and a bigger such set of "360 combat methods of Arhat" in Shaolin.

=== Other Luohan styles ===
There is a famous saying, "all martial arts under heaven originated from Shaolin," and all styles at Shaolin originated from Luohan 18 hands and Luohanquan. Because of the historical and technical effects of Shaolin temple on other styles, Luohan styles of Shaolin are the roots of many many other styles. There are many styles with the name Luohanquan created and developed outside of Shaolin temple: In Henan province which Shaolin temple is located, there are several Luohanquans. In the nearby provinces of Hebei and Shandong, in the southern provinces of Zhejiang and Fujian, and the southwestern province of Sichuan, where Mount Emei is located, and also in south China sea area there are many different Luohan styles. For example, in Fujian there are more than 5 different Luohanquans recognized. The Luohan's 18 hands style of Hua quan from Shandong province is also very famous, so that it is even practiced by some lineages of Shaolin monks. Some of these Luohan styles have over exaggerated Luohan imitating tastes, while some do not have any Luohan-looking characteristics.
