= Lai Tung Pai =

Chinese style of martial art

Lai Tung Pai, (Chinese: 黎峒派) (sometimes spelled Lai Tong Pai, also known in Mandarin as Pán Quán 蟠拳, in Cantonese as Pùhn Kyùhn 盤拳 or coiling fist style) is a martial art of Chinese origin, coming from the Siu Lahm (Mandarin Shaolin) tradition in the Guangdong providence of China. The art was developed at the Henan Siu Lahm Temple and then was moved to the Hoi Tong Monastery in Guangdong when the former was burned down during the Qing dynasty. The dates are not certain, as the only living person, Kong Hoi (surname given first as in Chinese tradition), studied at the Hoi Tong Monastery in the early 20th century, but it is believed the style originated in the early 1600s. Grandmaster Kong is a member of the Hong Kong Chinese Martial Art Association, now named the Hong Kong Chinese Martial Arts Dragon and Lion Dancing Association Ltd.

== History ==
Lai Tung Pai was said to have been developed by a monk named Chi Sen. Chi Sen in turn trained four monks: Yuen Cheuk, Yuen Kok, Yuen Sing, and Yuen Mau. Orphans were admitted into the temple every three years and given the same surname. The four monks fled the temple after it was attacked and burned down. Each thought it safer to split up and reunite at a later time. Yuen Mau is the only monk we have any history of; the rest were lost sometime following the time the temple was burned down.

Yuen Mau traveled south to where the Guangdong providence is now. Yuen Mau sought shelter in the monastery of a small town named Lai Tung (literally translated “dig a hole”). Yuen Mau continued his studies and being from the main temple, was made abbot of the small monastery. Yuen Mau chose Lai Tung because of its small size, thinking there would be no military significance of attacking the village, as the people were poor and uneducated. Yuen Mau was wrong.

When a small regiment of troops came to Lai Tung and started to cause trouble, Yuen Mau had had enough. Having trained the monks in the art of Poon Kuen, the monks defeated the soldiers and brought peace back to the village (It is likely that the troops were either deserters or a group of bandits, as the army would have surely not taken an attack like this lightly; the other scenario is that the monks killed the troops and, being a small force, the army never went looking for them. As with all legends, there is always an element of truth to them). Yuen Mau then called the art Lai Tung Pai or “family of Lai Tung Village” after the town he helped defend.

The next monk to have any history written about him was Fa Hoi (法海, Fahai). Fa Hoi was a monk at the temple in Lai Tung when he was chosen to go to the Hoi Tong Monastery on the Pearl River. The Hoi Tong Monastery was a smaller temple, in what is now Guangdong, of the larger regional temple of Foshan. The Foshan Temple (Named after the city of Foshan) was a haven for several martial arts in the late 19th and early 20th centuries. Many famous martial artists have come from the city of Foshan and had connections to the temple including Wong Kei Ying, Wong Fei Hong, and Ip Man. Fa Hoi had come to the Hoi Tong Monastery in the late 19th century.

The temple was a place to worship and many people traveled there on a weekly basis. One such person was Kong Ki, a merchant in the surrounding area. Kong Ki saw the monks practicing kung fu. Kong Ki was skilled in Hung Gar and wanted to increase his knowledge by practicing with the monks. He noticed one monk doing a form (kata in Japanese arts) that he did not recognize. Inquiring about the form, Fa Hoi explained it was not Hung Gar, but Lai Tung Pai. In a friendly match, Kong Ki lost to Fa Hoi. Kong Ki then became the sole student of Fa Hoi and the first person outside the temple to learn Lai Tung Pai.

After some time, Kong Ki had gotten married and had a son, Kong Hoi (named after his teacher, Jiang Hai 江海). On Kong Hoi’s 10th birthday, Kong Ki started teaching him the art of Lai Tung Pai. When Kong Hoi was 13, the Japanese had invaded China. Kong Hoi joined a guerrilla resistance troop and attacked a Japanese camp. Kong Hoi was injured in the fight but made it back home. Kong Ki, not wanting his son to see war again, sent Kong Hoi to the Hoi Tong Monastery and to his old teacher, Fa Hoi. Fa Hoi took the young man in.

Kong Hoi recalled his experiences in the temple. Every day, he had to gather water, to cook for all the monks, and to clean up and take care of the temple altars. After all of this was done, then he would practice kung fu. Kong Hoi stated that he had several teachers besides Fa Hoi. Training was difficult and long. Each form was mastered before a new one was learned. Kong Hoi stayed in the temple until Fa Hoi had died.

Post World War II was a time for revolution in China. The Cultural Revolution preached out with the old customs, and martial arts were part of that “cleansing.” Kong Ki and his family moved to Hong Kong where it was safe.

Kong Hoi became a Chinese Physician certified by the Hong Kong Government. He has also served as a judge in several Hong Kong tournaments.

At one time Kong Hoi had three schools in Hong Kong. During the mid 1960s, Kong Hoi began training a student named Li Chi Keung.

Li later moved in with his Sifu and lived there for three years. Kong Hoi had shut his schools down by this time and retired from teaching. Li worked at the docks by day and studied Lai Tung Pai at night. Li had a chance to move to America and left Hong Kong in 1978.

Li joined several schools and took students sporadically. In the mid 1980s, Li moved to Charlotte, North Carolina. In the late 1980s, while working in a Chinese restaurant, Li taught at a local YMCA. Daryl McFarley learned of Li and went to see the class. Daryl studied at the local community college in the art of Li Ki. Daryl McFarly, requested to be trained by Li. A friendship was formed and later in the decade Li started teaching a few students, including Mykle Marriette, Bevo Barksdale and Anthony Stephenson and in the early 90s Michael Garcia, Drew Taylor, and Christopher Facente.

In 1990, Li went back to Hong Kong for a visit with his Sifu and was promoted to Sifu by Kong Hoi. A celebration was held, giving Sifu Li permission to carry on Lai Tung Pai. Several schools were opened and closed throughout the early 1990s. In 1992, Anthony Stephenson and Chris Facente opened a school for their Sifu and thus Sifu Li began teaching Lai Tung Pai at that school in Mint Hill, North Carolina. This school is still open as of this edit in 2019.

In 2002, 2004, 2006 and 2008, Sifu Li permitted some of his students to go to Hong Kong and train with Grandmaster Kong Hoi. In 2004, Grandmaster Kong Hoi retired from teaching, but accepted these students as closed door, Chris Facente and Anthony Stephenson, and promoted them to Sifu in order to preserve and carry on the art of Lai Tung Pai at their perspective schools. . Sifu Facente remaining in Mint Hill, North Carolina and Sifu Stephenson at that time at his school in Kings Mountain, North Carolina just east of Charlotte. In 2013, Sifu Stephenson moved to Troy, Ohio just north of Dayton, Ohio. He taught a few private students in Ohio, while visiting his school in Kings Mountain occasionally. In 2015, it was decided to close the Kings Mountain school and expand the art to Ohio in earnest at his school which officially opened in December 2015 in Troy, Ohio the Kong Hoi Kung Fu Association - Troy. Sifu Facente and Sifu Stephenson, were recently inducted as members of the Hong Kong Chinese Martial Arts Dragon and Lion Dancing Association and join their Grandmaster Kong Hoi as members keeping Lai Tung Pai alive in the Hong Kong martial arts community. Also inducted as members are a few of their disciples. They, along with a selected handful of their students, are dedicated to preserving and passing on the style of Lai Tung Pai to future generations.

Sifu Li died on March 10, 2017. A private ceremony was held including his students, friends and some family. A traditional funerary Lion Dance was done by his most senior students. Li Chi Keung will be remembered for all he did to bring Lai Tung Pai to the US and pass down the art to keep it alive for future generations.

== Style specifics ==
Lai Tung Pai is a Siu Lahm (Shaolin) style of martial art. Both external and internal in nature, Lai Tung Pai has several forms that are to be done with external and/or internal power control (see Chinese Martial Arts). Lai Tung Pai forms are generally short (24 to 36 moves), with the exception of the Kyùhn Júng form, that consists of over 400 moves. Many bridging forms exist and a very mobile form named Lao Ying. As the story goes, this form was created by a monk that had a dream of a dragon. Upon awaking from a nap the dragon was startled by the wind blowing a willow tree's limbs. This, resulted with the dragon fighting the willow tree. Lai Tung Pai also has its own tai chi forms called 五行太極 Ng Hang Taai Gik or 5 element tai chi and 極三峯, 九宮太極 Gau Gung Taai Gihk Gik Saam Fung forms 1 and 2, as well as secret forms. The style also practices the traditional Sil Lum weapons (Eyebrow staff, 9' Long Pole, broadsword, 9-Ring Kwan Doa, butterfly knives, with the most famous being the two section spear), and uses several Muhk Yan Jong. Lai Tung Pai also teaches and performs the traditional Lion Dance and the Dragon Dance.
