= San Huang Pao Chui =

San Huang Pao Chui 三皇炮捶
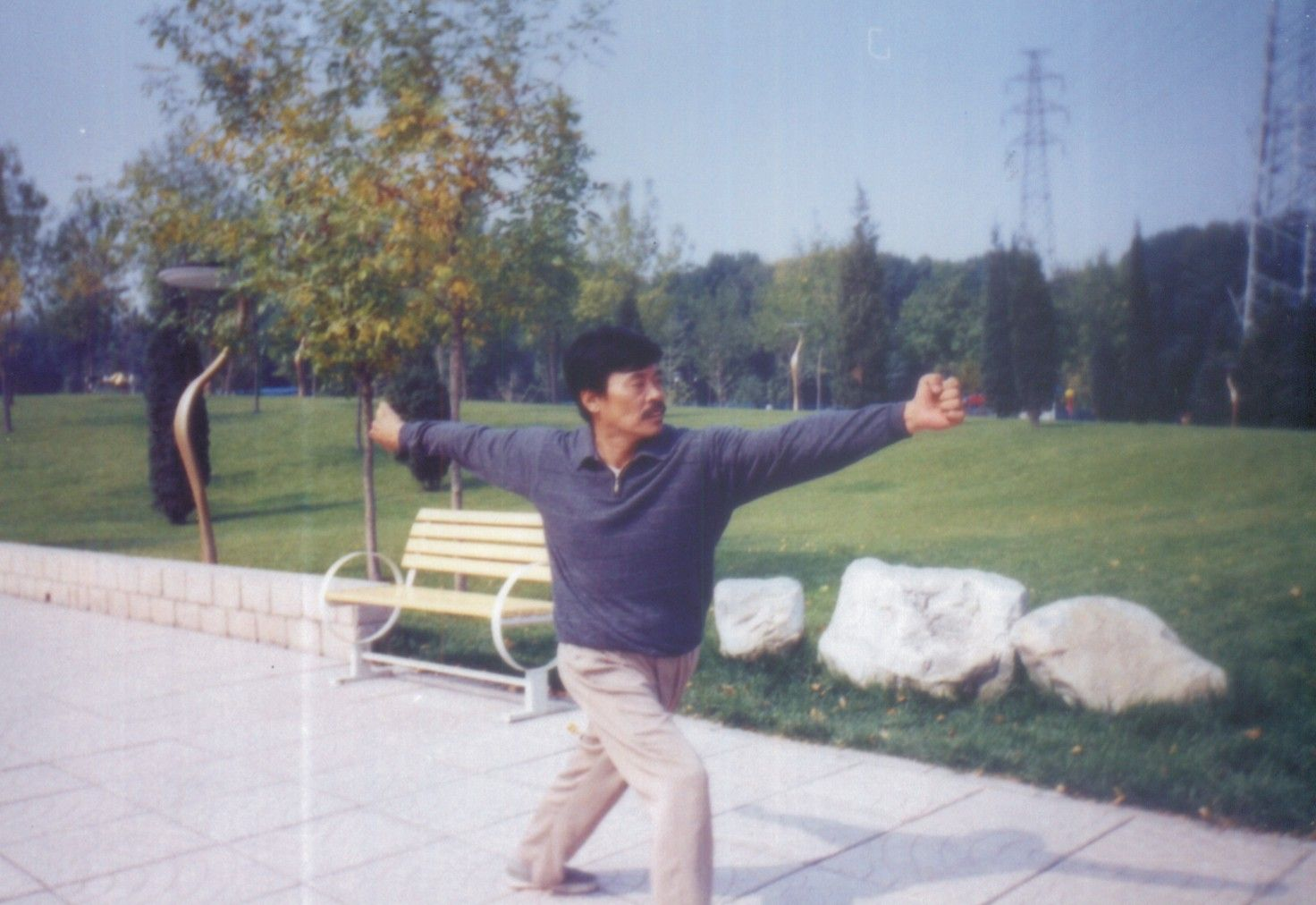
- The Shízìchuí posture ("the cross-shaped fist-hammer") executed by Shifu Yú Decai.
- Also known as: Pào Chuí, Pao Chuan
- Focus: Striking
- Country of origin: China
- Creator: Puzhao
- Parenthood: Mount Emei Taoist martial art
- Descendant arts: Chen-style tai chi
- Olympic sport: No

San Huang Pao Chui (Chinese: 三皇炮捶) literally can be translated from Chinese as "Three Emperor Cannon Fist". San Huang Pao Chui originated from the three emperors Fu Xi, Shennong, and Gonggong in China. They were previously known throughout China as the Three August Ones. The popular spread of Pao Chui was in early association with Shaolin and was one of the first styles implemented into the Shaolin monastery training regimen. The first Shaolin monks learned this style from local martial artists from Mount Emei. Local legends say that the style was created by the bonding of Heaven, Earth, and the three emperors.

At a festival of the Emperor Gaozu, Shaolin monk Tanzong gave a demonstration of Pao Chui.

Chen-style tai chi includes a Pao Chui routine in its curriculum.

== First monk on Mount Emei ==
Around the time of Ming and Qing dynasties, there was a monk by the name of Puzhao, who climbed Mount Emei in the Sichuan province. Upon arrival he became the pupil of a Daoist priest who taught him the first style of Pao Chui. Years later, he finally mastered the art and returned to teach it to Qiao Sanxiu and Gan Fengchi during the reigns of the Kangxi and Yongzheng emperors.

Puzhao taught Qiao the soft fluid motions as the core of his form but strength and power as the outward application. On the other hand, he taught Gan strength and power but to use a supple soft motion as his output.

== Gan-style of Pao Chui ==
The Gan Style focused on maintaining a positive life with strong health, with mental and physical vitality. Between 1736 and 1795, during the reign of the Qianlong Emperor, Qiao Sanxiu passed on what he learned at Mount Emei to his disciple Qiao Heling. Years later Qiao Heling passed this style on to his disciples to Song Mailun and Yu Liandeng. There are no known current disciples of Gan Fengchi.

Yu continued to teach the core foundation style of San Huang Pao Chui to the newer disciples, yet Song decided to broaden the style by combining Pao Chui with new forms from dozens of other different schools in order to create new routines. This led Song to invent the later Three-Hand hold style he is known for.

Pao Chui has become increasingly popular in Beijing, Hebei, Shanxi, Shandong, Liaoning, Henan and Jilin. The style has been divided into Song-Style and Yu-Style Three Emperor Fists, with the latter further divided into Yu Fists and Song Hands.

== Concepts ==
Sanhuang Pao Chui is also called Pao Chuan, utilizing powerful and rapid fist blows like the firing of a cannon. The foundation routine of this form is embedded in Cross Hand blows with the squatting horse stance being the core stance used.

Fa jin is used or explosive energy, to create hard powerful strikes at a target. This is extensively based on the theory of yin and yang as well as the theory of Gang Ruo which states the usage of both hard and soft energy being used together at once. The main movement is shizichi, also known as Cross Fist. This basic step is called Yuen Dang Bu, in which attacks are aimed at the target's midsection, using both powerful long and short strikes together.

The effectiveness of this style is incorporated with following the concepts of positive and negative, hard and supple, attack and defense, and advance and retreat. These are all based on the theory of Ying and Yang. Practitioners coordinate their eyes, hands, and body movement. By using the mind, spirit, footwork, and practiced breathing, practitioners can generate force on each attack. It requires all of these to be connected so when one throws a punch, the buildup of power is equivalent of pulling a bow and firing the arrow.

== See also ==
- Changquan
- Chen-style taijiquan
- List of tai chi forms
- Shaolin kung fu
