= Tongbeiquan =

Chinese martial art

Tongbeiquan 通背拳
- Also known as: Spreading Power from the Back Boxing, Arm Boxing, White Ape
- Focus: Striking, weapons training, qigong
- Country of origin: China
- Creator: Lu Yunqing (originator); Lao Qi Pai style: Qi Xin; Shao Qi Pai style: Qi Taichang; Shi Baiyuan style: Shi Hongsheng
- Famous practitioners: Xiu Jianchi (founder of Wuxing Tongbeiquan), DK Yoo
- Parenthood: Wudang Kung Fu, Wuxingquan
- Descendant arts: Bafaquan, Piguaquan, Northern Praying Mantis
- Olympic sport: No

Tongbeiquan (通背拳 tōngbèiquán; literally "Spreading Power from the Back Boxing", as tong means "through," bei means "back" and quan means "fist/boxing") is a school of martial arts popular in northern China, known for engaging opponents from maximum distance. Tongbeiquan's basic precepts are Taoist in nature and many of the training methods in tongbeiquan are similar to those of the internal styles. In traditional tongbeiquan training, several parts are included: basic training (stance, arm techniques, leg techniques and conditioning), combinations, forms training, two-person free sparring, weapons training, and qigong training.

On November 1, 2025, ninth-generation Qijia Tongbeiquan disciple Zhao Honggang was knocked unconscious after three rounds of Power Slap.

== History ==
According to the Boxing Chronicles by Xu Jianchi (1931), Qi Xin of Zhejiang went to teach back-through boxing at Gu'an County in Hebei Province in the middle and latter half of the Qing Dynasty. His style was then called Qi-style Boxing which was later named as tongbei or "Back-through Boxing". Qi's son, Qi Taichang, improved and developed the boxing techniques. People then divided Qi-style tongbeiquan into an old style (represented by the father) and a new one (represented by the son). The old style emphasizes simplicity and power whereas the new style concentrates on exquisiteness and suppleness. Many masters emerged in this school later. Tongbeiquan now in practice is generally divided into two styles. One has been passed down from Qi Xin, the father, and the other from Qi Taichang, the son. Xiu Jianchi, a successor to the new style, combined the best elements of his predecessors and left his theoretical summaries on stances, methods and philosophy of boxing to create a new style, wuxing tongbeiquan. Xiu's writings are vital materials for the study and research of tongbeiquan. Another of Lu Yunqing's students was Shi Hongsheng, who also created his own Shi-style Tongbeiquan.

From 1910s, some Qi style masters started to teach tongbeiquan to the public. Subsequently, Qi style became much more popular than the Shi style. Today the vast majority of tongbeiquan practitioners are in Qi style or its branches. But even when they taught in public, the masters still withheld some skills. Most masters only taught high level skills to some disciples in their private classes. As Qi style became somewhat more popular, a few forms were created for teaching purposes. Compared to Qi style, the Shi style maintained more traditional forms. For this reason, the Shi style is also known as heiquan (Black Fist) and the style is sometimes considered heterodox.

== Names and subsets ==
Due to its long history, tongbeiquan has various names and subsets in different places. Baiyuan tongbeiquan has two subsets: Shi- and Qi-style. From Qi-style Baiyuan tongbeiquan there are also a number of subsets such as, wuxing tongbeiquan and Five-Monkey tongbeiquan. While there are different names and styles of Baiyuan tongbeiquan all of the fore-mentioned styles are based on the same boxing theory and have similar origins. There are also Shaolin tongbeiquan, Pigua tongbeiquan, and others that differ from Baiyuan tongbeiquan in methods and principles, but bear similar names.

There are other styles, with names that are also pronounced "tongbeiquan", but are written with different "bei" or "bi" characters (with meanings of "preparing", "arm", etc.). Many books about Chinese martial arts confuse those styles with each other. Also there is another style called "Hong Dong tongbeiquan," which is a local version of tai chi and is therefore a different style.

== Abridged tongbeiquan lineage since the Qing Dynasty ==
=== Emperor Daoguang's Reign: 1821–1850 ===
Lu Yunqing
Qi Xin; Founder of Lao Qi Pai tongbeiquan	Shi Hongsheng; Founder of Baiyuan tongbeiquan
Qi Taichang; Founder of Shao Qi Pai tongbeiquan	Zhang Wencheng
Xu Tianhe	Li Zhendong; Quick Hand Black Li
Xu Jianchi; Founder of wuxing tongbeiquan	Li Shusen; Iron Arm Li

== Secrecy ==
Baiyuan tongbeiquan masters followed the orthodox Chinese martial art model of keeping their teachings very secretive. Even other traditional wushu stylists often criticize this group as too conservative. Traditionally, tongbeiquan instructors usually did not teach in public. Because of this conservatism, it was very difficult to join the group to study this skill. tongbeiquan teachers would teach only behind closed doors. The masters always felt that the high-level skills should only be passed to morally upstanding people who must have a good personality, be smart enough to grasp the principles, as well as be diligent in practice. So all this prevented tongbeiquan from having particularly large numbers of practitioners. The result of this lack of open teaching is seen in the rarity of the style. However, in recent years many teachers have become much more open and there are teachers teaching openly throughout China as well as in the West.

== Application of the Five Elements to tongbeiquan theory ==
Wuxing tongbeiquan takes the five elements as its core and back-through as its application. Back-through Boxing takes the five elements of traditional Chinese philosophy as its basic theory. This philosophy believes that heaven is an macrocosm while the human being is a microcosm but the principles of the systems remains constant regardless of the size. The five elements of the heaven are metal, wood, water, fire and earth while those of the human being the heart, liver, spleen, lung and kidney. The five elements of boxing are wrestling, batting, piercing, axing and boring. The Chinese boxing philosophy believes that everything in the world finds its roots in the five elements while all Boxing schools are also based on its five elements. The following table demonstrates the interrelations among the five elements of the heaven and those of the human being and boxing:

Human Organ	Element	Action	Feeling	Natural occurrence
Lung	Metal	Flicking	Exploding	Lightning
Liver	Wood	Batting	Pushing	Fog
Kidney	Water	Piercing	Hammering	Star
Heart	Fire	Chopping	Hitting	Thunderbolt
Spleen	Earth	Drilling	Tossing	Arrow

== Contemporary Wushu ==
Tongbeiquan is present in modern wushu as well and is practiced by the contemporary wushu athletes coming out of the Chinese sports universities (referred to in some wushu circles and the university faction Xue Yuan Pai who study the routines in school and learn with performance being the key feature).

In the 1970s, tongbeiquan was added by the Chinese Wushu Association as an open routine for wushu taolu forms competition. In the 1980s it was formally classified as a Class II Other Open Hand event, which means it is in the Northern category of traditional empty hand forms along with fanziquan, piguaquan and chuojiao.

The modern wushu style of tongbeiquan, while having a non-martial emphasis, is still popular in the same regions of northern China such as Shandong and Liaoning provinces.

== Tongbei throughout the world ==
Today, the traditional style is kept alive through the efforts of practitioners throughout northern China, particularly by small groups throughout Beijing, Shandong, and Liaoning. There are also both groups throughout North America and Europe.
