= Drunken Monkey =

Chinese martial art

Drunken Monkey 醉猴
- Also known as: Drunken Monkey Form, Drunken Monkey Pole Form, Tai Shing
- Focus: Striking
- Country of origin: China
- Creator: Kou-Sze
- Famous practitioners: Ken Tak Hoi; Cho Chat Ling
- Parenthood: Northern Shaolin Kung Fu, Tei Tong
- Olympic sport: No

Drunken Monkey Form or Drunken Monkey Pole Form of Kung Fu is a Chinese martial art, a variation of the Monkey Style.

This style is different from Zui Quan (Drunken Fist), as the practitioner is imitating gestures of an intoxicated monkey, rather than a human fighter.

Drunken Monkey does not begin with drunken-like gestures, but rather the drunken aspect enters the forms in the middle-section when the practitioner plays the movements of a monkey drinking stolen wine.

The Drunken Monkey style is visually completely different when compared to Zui Quan and is shorter in sequence. This style, however, is considered more artistically beautiful, acrobatic and agile compared to Zui Quan. This does not necessarily mean that it is more or less effective in actual combat.

Contrary to claims in movies, actually being drunk does not improve drunken monkey or drunken fist. It is based on the concept of imitating being drunk; actually being drunk is not required and may impair one's speed and ability to perform complex movements.

== Description and techniques ==
The form is short and simple, consisting of a few dozen or so movements. Much of the moves are performed at a low ground level, with rolling, tumbling and falling techniques. There are also many unusual grappling and blocking techniques. The higher level attacks include eye pokes and throat hits, as well as blocks and punches (with punching being exceptional, as monkeys generally do not attack with their fists). There are also many middle attacks such as kicks aimed to the stomach area, and lower attacks to the lower abdomen, groin and legs.

- The "Monkey-Hands" Technique: Relaxed hand strikes with the palm facing downward and fingers drooping towards the ground, used to deflect hand strikes and kicks, and also to strike with the fingers towards the throat and eyes.
- The "Monkey-Claws" Technique: This attack is basically a strike with the palm facing forward and hitting with the fingers and striking downward, like any animal's clawing motion. It is used to hit the face and eyes, and can also be used to grapple the opponent's wrist.
- Low Kicks and Ground Kicks: There are many kicks in Drunken Monkey, primarily aimed at the lower portions of the body (legs, groin, abdomen) and executed from a low position or from lying on the ground.

== Origin ==
The inspiration for Drunken Monkey was given by its founder, Kou-Sze in honor of "Sūn Wùkōng" from the story Journey to the West, written in the Ming Dynasty by Wu Cheng'en. In the story, the Monkey King stole all the peaches of the "spiritual peach tree" of the Heavenly King Mother and drank all the wine reserved for fairies and immortals who were invited to the birthday party of the Heavenly King. The Heavenly King became enraged and the Monkey King made a mess of the Heavenly Palace after fighting and defeating all of the Heavens' warriors. The Monkey King had to be finally subdued by Buddha Yu-lei.

== In media ==
- The English dub of Jackie Chan's Drunken Master II (1994) (AKA The Legend of Drunken Master (2000) (U.S.)) incorrectly references the Drunken Monkey style whenever Wong Fei-hung is about to perform some acrobatic kicks. The original dialogue actually references the immortals Li Tieguai and Zhang Gualao of the Daoist style of Drunken Fist. The former is a cripple with a powerful right leg and the latter is known for his swift double-kicks. All eight immortals are also referenced in the original Drunken Master (1978).
- The main character (Chia-Liang Liu) in Feng hou (1979) AKA Mad Monkey Kung-Fu is a master of Lau Family Hung Gar kung fu which has its own variation of Monkey Boxing inclusive of the Drunken monkey technique
- A more recent film featuring a drunken monkey style is Chui ma lau (2002) AKA Drunken Monkey In this movie Chia-Liang Liu is also one of the lead characters and again the technique on display is a variation of the Lau Family Hung Gar system.
- The movie Chu long ma liu (1979) also features the Monkey styles including Drunken
- A similar attack style appears in Escape From Monkey Island.
- In the Dragon Ball series (episode 26): Kame-Sen'nin (Master Roshi) uses the technique drunken boxing on Goku in the finals of The World Martial Arts Tournament. As a reaction to this, Goku uses a new technique called the crazy monkey technique.

== See also ==
- Drunken boxing
