= Dog kung fu =

Martial arts style from Fujian, China

Dog Kung Fu 狗拳
- Also known as: Chinese Dog Boxing, Gǒuquán, Dìshùquán, Dishu Quanfa, Ground skill canine methods, Dishang Feilong, Flying Dragon Over Ground
- Focus: Striking, Grappling
- Country of origin: China
- Creator: Unknown
- Famous practitioners: Hui Kai (founder of Ditangquan)
- Parenthood: Iron Shirt, Iron Palm
- Descendant arts: Ditangquan
- Olympic sport: No

Dog Kung Fu, i.e. Gǒuquán (狗拳), i.e. Dìshùquán (地术拳), is a martial arts style native to Fujian province China. While sharing many similar features to styles like Wuzuquan, Huzunquan, and many others from the same region, this southern style of Chinese boxing has the unique feature of specializing in takedowns, Chin Na, and ground fighting while often taking advantage of utilizing techniques from an inferior position. This martial art also teaches Iron Shirt and Iron Palm fighting methods as well as specialized leaping techniques. Its creation is traditionally credited to a Buddhist nun who developed the style to defend herself from bandits on her travels.

== Origins ==
One of the legends on the origins of Dog Kung Fu says that in the southern area of China in Fujian Province, resided the White Lotus (白蓮) temple, where often the nuns who were admitted previously lived secular lives. At that time women were often subjugated to the practice of foot binding. Therefore, any practice that required standing physical exertion was difficult in the least and practically impossible at worst. In response to these physical constraints, the nuns developed a system of fighting that they could use to defend themselves from bandits and wild animals.

During the Qing Dynasty imperial regime's destruction of the temples, a nun by the name of Si Yue had left White Lotus Temple and traveled to the northern areas of the province. Supposedly she had fallen ill in the Yongtai region near Fuzhou, it was there that she was assisted by the Chen Family who took care of her until recovery. As she was indebted to the Chen Family she remained and taught their son, Chen Biao, Gouquan. The Chen family kept this art a family secret for several generations.

Another legend suggests that the famous Fong Sai-Yuk was a master of Dishuquan and had passed his skills to monks in the Zhuyuansi Temple (nowadays known as Guanyuan Temple), this was passed through various generations until a monk named Hui Kai taught the style to Zheng Yishan.

== See also ==
- Hak Fu Mun

== Training books ==
- FuJian Shaolin Dog Boxing by Chen Zhi Fan (TC 515)
- Shaolin Dog Style Boxing Manual by Ding Xiao Se (TC 509)
- Fukien Ground Boxing: Nan Shaoling Leg Techniques (Chinese Martial Arts) by Chu-Xian Cai (Author), Mei Xue-Xiong (Translator)

== Images and videos ==
- Di Tang Ground Boxing 地趟 (VCD#755)
