= Huaquan =

Chinese martial art

Huaquan 華拳
- Also known as: China Fist, Glorious Boxing
- Focus: Striking, Chin Na, weapons training
- Country of origin: China
- Creator: Cai Mao
- Famous practitioners: Cai Tai; Cai Gang; Cai Wanzhi; Ding Yushan; Cai Guigin; Cai Longyun
- Parenthood: Northern Taoist Kung Fu, Chin Na
- Olympic sport: Wushu (sport)

Huaquan (simplified Chinese: 华拳; traditional Chinese: 華拳) is a Chinese martial art in the changquan family. It is believed to have originated during the Liu Song dynasty near Mount Hua in Shaanxi Province.

== History ==
There are legends written during Emperor Xuanzong of Tang's reign about a Mount Hua knight named Cai Mao, who was famous for his prowess in combat and swordplay. Apparently Cai Mao had killed an enemy, a noble from Chang'an and had to go into hiding to escape the family's wrath.

400 years later we hear of Cai's descendants, Cai Tai and Cai Gang of Jining in Shandong Province; were reputed using the huaquan style in public competitions. It is because of this historical record that many credit these two brothers with preserving huaquan as we know it today. However, it was Cai Wanzhi of Jining during the reign of Jaiqing during the Ming dynasty who is credited with the finishing touches on huaquan by writing the book "The Secrets of Huaquan"; the finishing touches could just be that he wrote the book, nobody can say for sure. Cai Wanzhi had based the book on the traditional philosophy of combining the "three pure essences", or treasures, of Spirit (Shen), Intrinsic Energy (Chi), and Internal force (Jing). Therefore, this specific style of Kung Fu is sometimes referred to as "Kung Fu of Essence." It is also known as Glorious/Magnificent Boxing, China Fist, or "The Fist of Hua Mountain." (Hua, meaning Glorious, is also synonymous for the word China/Chinese). Modern-day huaquan is considered to be one of the five major styles of changquan. Due to its translation and spelling, there is a different style of huaquan meaning "Flower Fist" (meihuaquan).

In classical and contemporary works of literary fiction and cinema (wuxia stories), huaquan is renowned for its swordplay skill. Historically the temples and monasteries on Mount Hua are quite ancient and the monks were renowned masters of Neidan, (Internal Alchemy) and the mountain was a designation for many martial artists, giving up common earthly life. Mount Hua is one of China's five Sacred Peaks of Taoism. Allegedly, Zhang Sanfeng, the Taoist sage and patriarch of tai chi studied at the monasteries of Mount Hua after his time at Shaolin in Song Shan and before retiring to the Wudang Mountains. The lesser-known internal martial-art style of liuhebafa was also developed on Mount Hua by the Taoist sage Chen Tuan (871–989) during the Song dynasty. The Mount Hua area played an important role for self-cultivation and Chinese Martial Arts development, like many of the other mountain regions (Song Shan, Er-Mei, Wudang, etc.).

Hua style was also brought into Shaolin Temple most notably by Emperor Taizu of Song, it is one of the four arts he brought into the temple. His martial art style (after extensive training with renowned northern masters), based on huaquan and other fists came to be known as "Emperor's Longfist", sometimes referenced as the premier Changquan style. There are also sets of forms the Shaolin monks adopted into their curriculum of training from the traditional huaquan system practised today (see reference).

Huaquan's modern history begins with Grandmaster Cai Guigin, born in Shandong province in 1877 during the later years of Qing dynasty. As a boy, Cai Guigin learned his families boxing from his grandfather, and later, after his grandfather's death, from Master Ding Yushan, another huaquan master. Cai Guigin stood out during his life as being acknowledged as the most important huaquan Grandmaster of his time. Beginning in 1897, Cai Guigin began to travel throughout China, specifically its southern provinces, spreading his boxing techniques along the way during a time of great change and revolution in China's history until he finally settled in Shanghai in the 1920s.

== Characteristics ==
Huaquan is an old style with a huge repertoire of techniques and forms. It stands as a complete system of martial art. There are traditionally 48 hand sets to master in the system - 18 primary forms, 18 secondary forms (sparring sets) and 12 advanced forms referred to as roads, as well as, Chin Na, long and short weapons sets and specialized training methods. As the style spread throughout the region, it became named after its place of origin- the Mount Hua area in Shaanxi Province. A highly developed style, there is an old saying in a form of a poem that basically states "knowing the 48 hand sets of huaquan, one can travel anywhere under the heavens.".

Huaquan is characterized by its smooth, well-connected movements. Its techniques are executed "like a fast burst of wind" and its flawless stances are "as rooted as the pine tree" (excerpt from the "12 patterns" of huaquan training). Huaquan practitioners breath deeply to spread air flows throughout the body, and the huaquan practitioner develops external/internal strength and energy for fighting, in particular cun jing (inch energy). Its footwork and hand technique are based on the Taoist philosophy of yin and yang. Huaquan is considered a Traditional Northern Kung Fu style, and is a perfect example of a "classical" long-arm style, although there is no shortage of mid-close range techniques. The huaquan 24 essentials rest on the principles of four hits (each category being quite extensive), 8 methods and 12 patterns. Eleven basic aspects of practice include use of shoulder, back, hip, knee, leg, foot, arm, elbow, fist, palm and claw.

Huaquan is also said to have the energies of five animals, although different from the "Shaolin Five Animals" System which are animal imitation forms. The energies of the huaquan 5 Animals are: Ape, Tiger, Dragon, Leopard, and Eagle. The older the style such as huaquan, the energies are used to develop and internalize the essence of the movement creating proper power, technique and form. Huaquan is an old Taoist style in origin.

== The art today ==
In the present day, huaquan is one of the main constituents of the modern "Changquan" (longfist) routines in contemporary Wushu taught in Sports Academies throughout China due to the efforts of one of the few remaining huaquan Grandmasters Cai Longyun (a.k.a. "the Big Dragon", son of Grandmaster Cai Guigin) when he wrote manuals on the first four roads and two of the sparring sets of the huaquan system (which are considered to be advanced, not beginner, forms), and collaborated with the Chinese Wushu Committee in the 1950s in creating beginner, intermediate, and advanced Wushu basics and curriculums. Cai Longyun is Vice Chairman of the Chinese Wushu Association, and an associate professor of the Shanghai Sports Academy.

Much of huaquan has been lost, absorbed, or modified by other systems and masters throughout the centuries, making the old traditional system hard to find. Currently, Sigung Joe Maury's primary focus is on preserving huaquan to be as authentic and complete as the original art dating back to the Liu Song dynasty. He has dedicated his life to the glory of spreading and teaching the original system of huaquan, as passed down from generation to generation from the last recorded huaquan Grandmaster, Cai Guiging. Sigung Maury teaches huaquan as it was taught to him by Master Chen who learned it from his father who had learned huaquan directly from Grandmaster Cai Guigin in the early 1900s.

Huaquan is a historical style, a classic Kung Fu style which is beautiful in appearance and effective in combat. The old huaquan manual states "practice boxing as if a boat floating on water; running along smoothly for a thousand miles, avoiding the barbaric style of practicing martial arts which leads to disorders of the body and mind".
