= Ditangquan =

Chinese martial art

Ditangquan 地躺拳
- Also known as: Ground Tumbling Boxing, Ground Prone Fist, Ground Fist
- Focus: Striking, weapons training
- Country of origin: China
- Creator: Hui Kai
- Famous practitioners: Zheng Yishan; Zhuang Zishen; Zhuang Xicong
- Parenthood: Dishuquan
- Descendant arts: Chuōjiǎo, Góuquán
- Olympic sport: Wushu (sport)

Ditangquan, (Chinese: 地躺拳, literally "ground tumbling boxing") is a category of martial art that originated in the Shandong Province of China during the Song dynasty (960–1279).

== History ==
According to the Quanzhou Ditangquan Fa style, a Dishuquan practitioner monk by the name of Hui Kai, a fellow of Sui Yue (also a Dishuquan practitioner) from the White Lotus temple, taught the art of Ditangquan Fa (Ground sequences Canine Methods) to Zheng Yishan. Zheng Yishan taught very few students but the main proponent of the art was Zhuang Zishen.

== Characteristics ==
The major characteristic of ditangquan is the ability to perform tumbles, falls, turns, leg skills, somersaults and aerial acrobatics using those techniques for both offense and defense.

Since the time of its origin, this martial art has spread throughout China and has been incorporated into other martial arts styles.

Although ditangquan exists as a traditional style, extant versions of it were unknown to the Chinese modern wushu coaches and players of the 1970s; as a result, a "new" version of Ditangquan was created based on the tumbling techniques of monkey and drunken styles, but without the characteristic monkey or drunken movements. Today, traditional versions of Ditangquan can still be found included as parts of other styles, such as in chuojiao, or as separate martial arts, such as Fujian gǒuquán (dog style); in the traditional styles, there is less emphasis on tumbling and more emphasis on attacking and defending while falling on the ground. In modern wushu, however, the "new" ditangquan remains a common style used in competition today.

== Styles ==
Examples of the varieties of Ditangquan that now exist include, among others:

- Moving-on-the-Ground Boxing (地行拳);
- Plum Blossom Ground Tumbling Boxing (地躺梅花拳);
- Shaolin Earth Dragon Boxing (少林地龍拳);
- Flying Dragon Ground Tumbling Boxing (飛龍地躺拳);
