= Tan Tui =

Chinese martial arts term

Tan Tui (traditional Chinese: 彈腿; simplified Chinese: 弹腿; pinyin: Tán Tuǐ) may refer to a particular style of Chinese Martial Arts, a kind of form(s), set(s) or routine(s), or a specific type of front snap kick.

As a form, set, or routine, Tantui can be found in many Northern styles of Chinese martial arts. Its prevalence being so widespread, a common saying among Chinese martial artists has evolved: If your Tán Tuǐ is good, your kung fu will be good.

The term tan tui itself has been translated into English a variety of ways, with the most prevalent equating to "Springing Leg." Others are Pond Leg, Tam's (as in surname – used to represent name of a family style of Chinese Martial Arts) Kicks, Pond Kicks and others. The name has been translated several different ways, with the most prevalent being that of 'springing leg'. The term is made up of two Chinese words or characters. Everyone tends to agree on the second word or character: 腿. In standard Mandarin Chinese, this is represented by the Pinyin romanization as Tuǐ, and literally means leg, thigh, shank, etc. However, in the world of martial arts, this has generally been accepted to mean 'kick,' or more specifically, a type of front snap kick.

The first Chinese character or word that makes up the term, however, is the one that tends to bring some confusion. The exact reasoning for the variations is unknown, however may be tied-in with the varying accounts of the form and / or style's origins and history.

Tan tui is deeply rooted in China's Hui ethnic group of people.

== Understanding Tan Tui as a form ==
Little is known of Tán Tuǐ as a complete style, however the routine bearing this name is wildly popular in various Northern styles. The two most common versions are known as 10 and 12 'road' Tán Tuǐ. The word "road" is used to refer to a piece of the form – a group of movements strung together – such that, road one will have its set of movements (perhaps executed once, but typically done three times) going in one direction, road two will have its movements going in the opposite direction and, road three going back in the other direction and so on ... It continues this way through road 10 or 12. There are other varieties of this form as well, 14, 20, 24, paired or "two-man" Tán Tuǐ, etc.

Styles that have incorporated a version of Tán Tuǐ into their curriculum usually use it as a beginner form or training form, however due to its large number of movements, could be used for intense study for many years, regardless of version.
