= Pao Chui =

Chinese martial art

Pao Chui (Chinese: 三皇炮捶; pinyin: Sān huáng pào chuí; lit. 'Three Emperor Cannon Punch') is a Chinese martial art attributed to the Three August Ones: Fuxi, Shennong, and Gonggong.

The spread of Pao Chui was due in part to its early association with Shaolin. Pao Chui was one of the earliest styles to be imported intact into the martial arts curriculum at the Shaolin Monastery. According to legend, the Shaolin monks learned Pao Chui from a martial artist of Mount Emei. At a festival thrown by the Emperor Gaozu, the Shaolin monk Tanzong gave a demonstration of Pao Chui.

Chen-style tai chi includes a Pao Chui routine in its curriculum.

== See also ==
- Changquan
- Chen-style tai chi
- List of tai chi forms
- Shaolin kung fu
