= Fanziquan =

Chinese martial art

Fanziquan 翻子拳
- Also known as: Rotating fist, bashanfan, 8 flash tumbles, bafanmen, 8 Rotations School
- Focus: Striking, weapons training
- Country of origin: China
- Creator: Qi Jiguang (attributed)
- Parenthood: Northern Shaolin kung fu
- Descendant arts: Tongbeiquan; Ma family style Mianzhang Fanzi
- Olympic sport: No

Fanziquan (Chinese: 翻子拳; pinyin: fānziquán; lit. 'Rotating fist') is a Chinese martial art that emphasizes offense and defense with the hands. Its movements have been described as:Two fists are fast like the falling rain drops, and fast like a snapping whip. Fanziquan routines are usually quite short and very fast.

== History ==
Until at least the Ming dynasty (1368–1644), fanziquan was known as 'bashanfan (Chinese: 八閃翻; literally "8 flash tumbles"), or "8 evasive tumbles" and is attributed to Qi Jiguang Whereas in the Qing dynasty it is known as BāfānMén (Chinese: 八翻门; lit. '8 Rotations School').

According to the bafanquan manuals, during the Ming dynasty a master named Wang Zhiyuan had been taught the boxing by a mountain wanderer in the turn of the 17th century. It is said that Wang was an accomplished warrior but had become injured in battle in a remote part of what is currently Shandong province. There, the wanderer assisted with Wang's injuries and instructed him in the methods of bafanquan to improve his already good martial skills.

The style then passed down through various generations in the Northern provinces such as Henan, Hebei and Shandong. During the Qing dynasty, one of the most famous exponents of the style was Li Gongran from Xiong county in Hebei province. During that time he became a famed boxer, and it was claimed that "from Nanjing to Beijing, all fanzi under heaven belongs to Li Gong (Grandmaster Li)". This indicated how key he was to the spread and development of the style. His son Li Erlou, and disciple Feng Zhenyuan, taught the style in Sunning county. Their students founded many "Security Logistics Bureaus".

In modern times, fanziquan is often taught in conjunction with chuojiao, not unlike how xingyiquan and baguazhang are often taught together. The routines of chuojiao, with its kicks, wide open stances and focus on hard power, were known as Martial Routines and those of fanziquan, with their more compact movements combining soft and hard power, were known as Scholarly Routines, which is why the chuojiao/fanziquan combination is known as Wen Wu or Martial-Scholar.

Both fanziquan and chuojiao are associated with the 12th century Song dynasty general Yue Fei, and the association between the two may date that far back. However, as a legendary figure, Yue Fei has had many martial arts attributed to him. Nonetheless, the association between the two is very old.

By the mid-19th century, Zhao Canyi, a general in the failed Taiping Rebellion, was a master of both styles. After the failure of the rebellion, Zhao went into seclusion in Raoyang, Hebei Province, where he taught fanziquan, which emphasizes the hands, to the Wang family and chuojiao, which emphasizes the feet, to the Duan family. During practice, the families would exchange techniques.

The complete system of fanziquan of Hebei province is rarely practiced today. The Dongbei Style of fanziquan is the most popular and was also the basis on which the Modern Wushu fanziquan routines have been based. Elements or parts of Old bafanmen have been spread under many banners.

- Liu Dekuan taught a set of bafanshou in Beijing which has been practiced by his descendants.
- The Eagle Claw style, which is a derivative of fanziquan, includes a set of xingquan and lianquan which are said to be the essence of the style and are based on some parts of bafanmen.
- In turn the Yingzhao fanziquan style is a combination of fanzi, Eagle Claw and Leopard kung fu.
- The Ma Family Tongbei System of North Western China includes the Dongbei variants of fanziquan.
- The Mianzhang style (Duanquan) was combined with Hebei Fanzi to create the style Mianzhang Fanzi.

Throughout history, bafanmen's techniques have been admired by many masters and as a result it is often recognized as Muquan, or Mother Fist, in representing how essential it is to the Chinese Martial Arts.
