= Shaolin kung fu =

Chinese martial art

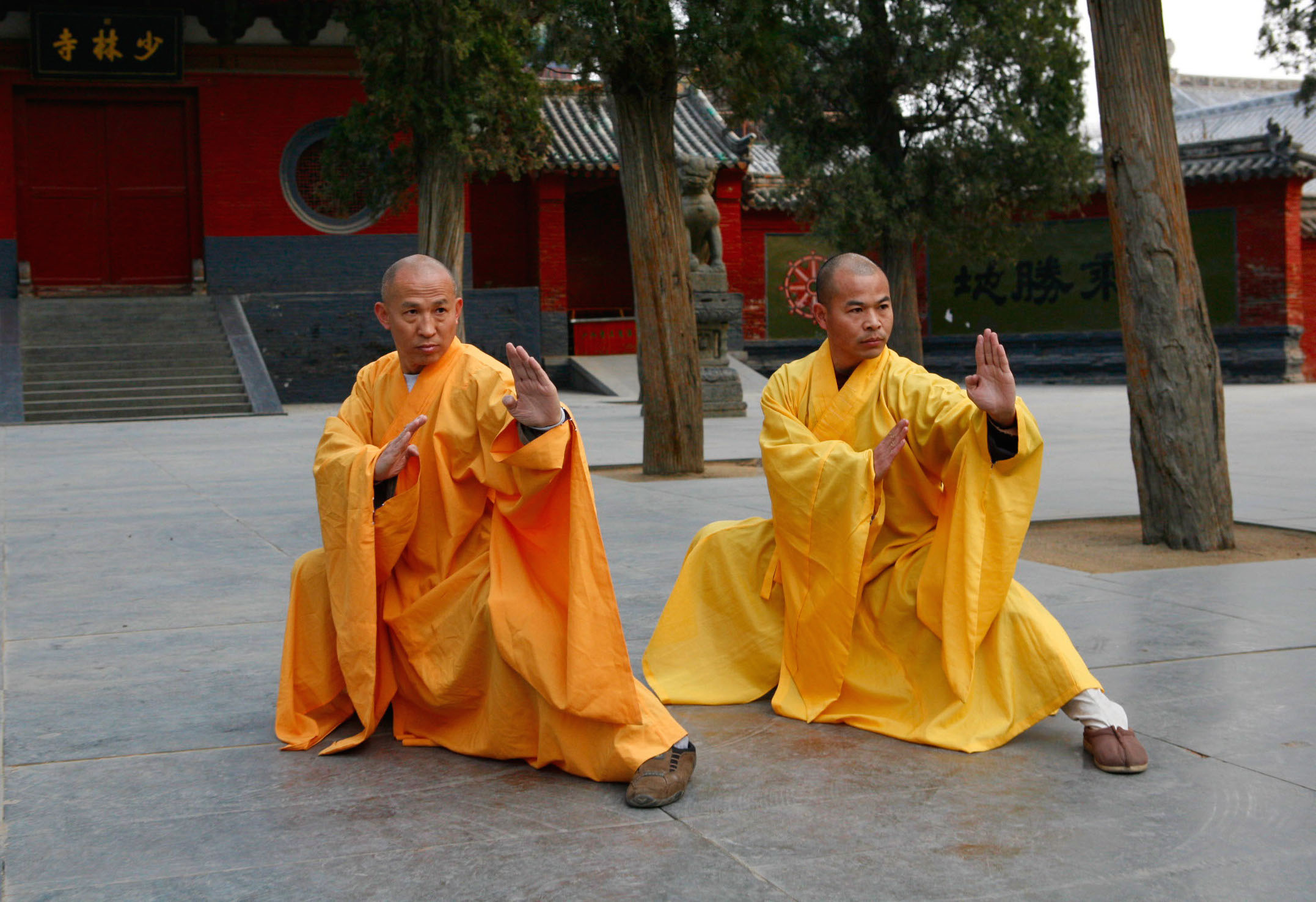
- Two fighters practicing kung fu in Shaolin Temple
- Also known as: Shaolin wushu
- Focus: Hybrid
- Hardness: Full-contact, semi-contact, light-contact
- Country of origin: China
- Famous practitioners: Shaolin monks
- Parenthood: kung fu, wushu
- Olympic sport: No

Shaolin kung fu (Chinese: 少林功夫; pinyin: Shàolín gōngfū), also called Shaolin Wushu (少林武術; Shǎolín wǔshù), or Shaolin quan (少林拳; Shàolínquán), is the largest and most famous style of kung fu. It combines Mahayana Buddhist, Chan philosophy and martial arts. It was developed in the Shaolin Temple in Henan, China during its 1500-year history. In Chinese folklore there is a saying, "Shaolin kung fu is the best under heaven", which indicates its superiority among martial arts, and "All martial arts under heaven originated from Shaolin", which indicates its influence on other martial arts. The name Shaolin is also used as a brand for the external styles of kung fu. Many styles in southern and northern China use the name Shaolin.

== History ==
=== Chinese martial arts before Shaolin ===
Chinese historical records, like Spring and Autumn Annals of Wu and Yue, the Bibliographies in the Book of the Han Dynasty, the Records of the Grand Historian, and other sources document the existence of martial arts in China for thousands of years. For example, the Chinese martial art of wrestling, Shuai Jiao, predates the establishment of Shaolin temple by several centuries. Since Chinese monasteries were large landed estates that made a considerable regular income, monks required some form of protection. Historical discoveries indicate that, even before the establishment of Shaolin temple, monks had been armed and also practiced martial arts. In 1784 the Boxing Classic: Essential Boxing Methods made the earliest extant reference to the Shaolin Monastery as Chinese boxing's place of origin. This is, however, a misconception, but even the fact that such a mistake could be made helps to show the historical importance of Shaolin kung fu.

=== Southern and Northern dynasties (420–589 AD) ===
==== Shaolin temple established ====
In 495 AD, Shaolin temple was built among the Song mountains in Henan province. The first monk who preached Buddhism there was Buddhabhadra (佛陀跋陀罗; Fótuóbátuóluó), simply called Batuo (跋陀) by the Chinese. There are historical records that Batuo's first Chinese disciples, Huiguang (慧光) and Sengchou (僧稠), both had exceptional martial skills. For example, Sengchou's skill with the tin staff and empty-hand strikes is even documented in the Chinese Buddhist canon.

==== Bodhidharma's influence ====
Bodhidharma is traditionally credited as the transmitter of Chan Buddhism to China, and regarded as its first Chinese patriarch. In Japan, he is known as Daruma.

The idea that Bodhidharma founded martial arts at the Shaolin Temple was spread in the 20th century. However, this idea came from a debunked apocryphal 17th century legend that claimed Bodhidharma taught the monks philosophies of Chan Buddhism, which the monks were then able to use to create their own combat techniques that developed into Shaolin kung fu. The idea of Bodhidharma influencing Shaolin boxing is based on a Qigong manual written during the 17th century. This is when a Taoist with the pen name 'Purple Coagulation Man of the Way' wrote the Sinews Changing Classic in 1624, but claimed to have discovered it. The first of two prefaces of the manual traces this succession from Bodhidharma to the Chinese general Li Jing via "a chain of Buddhist saints and martial heroes." The work itself is full of anachronistic mistakes and even includes a popular character from Chinese fiction, the 'Qiuran Ke' ('Bushy Bearded Hero') (虬髯客), as a lineage master. Scholar-officials as far back as the Qing dynasty have taken note of these mistakes. The scholar Ling Tinkang (1757–1809) described the author as an "ignorant village master." Even then, the association of Bodhidharma with martial arts only became widespread as a result of the 1904–1907 serialization of the novel The Travels of Lao Ts'an in Illustrated Fiction Magazine:

One of the most recently invented and familiar of the Shaolin historical narratives is a story that claims that the Indian monk Bodhidharma, the supposed founder of Chinese Chan (Zen) Buddhism, introduced boxing into the monastery as a form of exercise around a.d. 525. This story first appeared in a popular novel, The Travels of Lao T'san, published as a series in a literary magazine in 1907. This story was quickly picked up by others and spread rapidly through publication in a popular contemporary boxing manual, Secrets of Shaolin Boxing Methods, and the first Chinese physical culture history published in 1919. As a result, it has enjoyed vast oral circulation and is one of the most "sacred" of the narratives shared within Chinese and Chinese-derived martial arts. That this story is clearly a twentieth-century invention is confirmed by writings going back at least 250 years earlier, which mention both Bodhidharma and martial arts but make no connection between the two.

=== Sui and Tang dynasties (581–907 AD): Shaolin soldier monks ===
During the short period of the Sui dynasty (581–618), the building blocks of Shaolin kung fu took an official form, and Shaolin monks began to create fighting systems of their own. The 18 methods of Luohan with a strong Buddhist flavour were practiced by Shaolin monks since this time, which was later used to create more advanced Shaolin martial arts. Shaolin monks had developed very powerful martial skills, and this showed itself towards the end of the Sui dynasty.

Like most dynastic changes, the end of the Sui dynasty was a time of upheaval and contention for the throne. The oldest evidence of Shaolin participation in combat is a stele from 728 that attests to two occasions: a defense of the monastery from bandits around 610 and their role in the defeat of Wang Shichong at the Battle of Hulao in 621. Wang Shichong declared himself Emperor. He controlled the territory of Zheng and the ancient capital of Luoyang. Overlooking Luoyang on Mount Huanyuan was the Cypress Valley Estate, which had served as the site of a fort during the Jin and a commandery during the Southern Qi. Emperor Wen of Sui had bestowed the estate on a nearby monastery called Shaolin for its monks to farm, but Wang Shichong, realizing its strategic value, seized the estate and there placed troops and a signal tower, as well as establishing a prefecture called Yuanzhou. Furthermore, he had assembled an army at Luoyang to march on the Shaolin Temple itself.

The monks of Shaolin allied with Wang's enemy, Li Shimin, and took back the Cypress Valley Estate, defeating Wang's troops and capturing his nephew Renze. Without the fort at Cypress Valley, there was nothing to keep Li Shimin from marching on Luoyang after his defeat of Wang's ally Dou Jiande at the Battle of Hulao, forcing Wang Shichong to surrender. Li Shimin's father was the first Tang Emperor and Shimin himself became its second. Thereafter Shaolin enjoyed the royal patronage of the Tang.

Though the Shaolin Monastery Stele of 728 attests to these incidents in 610 and 621 when the monks engaged in combat, it does not allude to martial training in the monastery, or to any fighting technique in which its monks specialized. Nor do any other sources from the Tang, Song and Yuan periods allude to military training at the temple. According to Meir Shahar, this is explained by a confluence of the late Ming fashion for military encyclopedias and, more importantly, the conscription of civilian irregulars, including monks, as a result of Ming military decline in the 16th century. Stele and documentary evidence shows the monks historically worshiped the Bodhisattva Vajrapani's "Kinnara King" form as the progenitor of their staff and bare hand fighting styles.

=== Ming dynasty (1368–1644) ===
From the 8th to the 15th centuries, no extant source documents Shaolin participation in combat; then the 16th and 17th centuries see at least forty extant sources attest that, not only did monks of Shaolin practice martial arts, but martial practice had become such an integral element of Shaolin monastic life that the monks felt the need to justify it by creating new Buddhist lore. References to Shaolin martial arts appear in various literary genres of the late Ming: the epitaphs of Shaolin warrior monks, martial-arts manuals, military encyclopedias, historical writings, travelogues, fiction, and even poetry.

These sources, in contrast to those from the Tang dynasty period, refer to Shaolin methods of combat unarmed, with the spear, and with the weapon that was the forte of the Shaolin monks and for which they had become famous, the staff. By the mid-16th century military experts from all over Ming China were travelling to Shaolin to study its fighting techniques.

Around 1560 Yu Dayou travelled to Shaolin Monastery to see for himself its monks' fighting techniques, but found them disappointing. Yú returned to the south with two monks, Zongqing and Pucong, whom he taught the use of the staff over the next three years, after which Zongqing and Pucong returned to Shaolin Monastery and taught their brother monks what they had learned. Martial arts historian Tang Hao traced the Shaolin staff style Five Tigers Interception to Yú's teachings.

The earliest extant manual on Shaolin kung fu, the Exposition of the Original Shaolin Staff Method was written in around 1610 and published in 1621 from what its author Chéng Zōngyóu learned during a more than ten-year stay at the monastery.

Conditions of lawlessness in Henan—where the Shaolin Monastery is located—and surrounding provinces during the late Ming dynasty and all of the Qing dynasty contributed to the development of martial arts. Meir Shahar lists the martial arts tai chi, Chang Family Boxing, Baguaquan, Xingyi quan and bajiquan as originating from this region and this time period.

==== Battles against pirates ====
From the 1540s to the 1560s, pirates known as wokou raided China's eastern and southeastern coasts on an unprecedented scale. The geographer Zheng Ruoceng provides the most detailed of the 16th-century sources which confirm that, in 1553, Wan Biao, Vice Commissioner in Chief of the Nanjing Chief Military Commission, initiated the conscription of monks—including some from Shaolin—against the pirates. Warrior monks participated in at least four battles: at the Hangzhou Bay in spring 1553 and in the Huangpu River delta at Wengjiagang in July 1553, Majiabang in spring 1554, and Taozhai in autumn 1555.

The monks won their greatest victory at Wengjiagang. On 21 July 1553, 120 warrior monks led by the Shaolin monk Tianyuan defeated a group of pirates and chased the survivors over ten days and twenty miles. The pirates suffered over one hundred casualties and the monks only four.

Not all of the monks who fought at Wengjiagang were from Shaolin, and rivalries developed among them. Zheng chronicles Tianyuan's defeat of eight rival monks from Hangzhou who challenged his command. Zheng ranked Shaolin first of the top three Buddhist centers of martial arts. Zheng ranked Funiu in Henan second and Mount Wutai in Shanxi third. The Funiu monks practiced staff techniques which they had learned at the Shaolin Monastery. The Wutai monks practiced Yang Family Spear (楊家槍; pinyin: Yángjiā qiāng).

The monks suffered a defeat at Taozhai in 1555, where four of them fell in battle; their remains were buried under the Stūpa of the Four Heroic Monks (Si yi seng ta) at Mount She near Shanghai.

== Contents ==
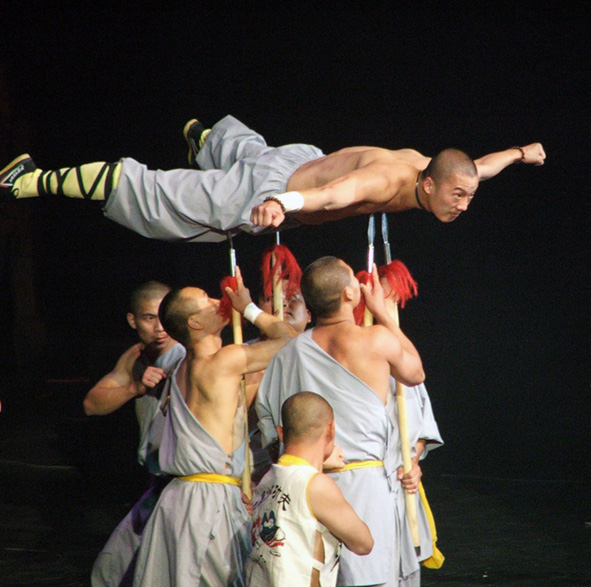
Shaolin monks demonstrate kung fu.

There is a famous saying that kung fu trains both the body and mind.

=== Body exercises ===
Body building exercises improve body abilities, including flexibility, balance, hardness, power, speed, and control of the body. These exercises are altogether called the 72 arts in the folklore. However the actual exercises are not actually countable.

=== Mind exercises ===
Combat skills (拳法; quánfǎ) include techniques, tactics, and strategies for barehanded, weapon, and barehanded vs. weapon situations.

==== Combat techniques ====
Kung fu teaches techniques for both defense and offense. Defensive techniques are mostly four types, dodge, block, catch, and parry, and offensive techniques are feint, hit, lock, and throw. Shaolin kung fu teaches all these types of techniques. In kung fu, techniques are taught via two-person practices. In these practices, one party attacks and the other defends or counters or stands in posture for the other party to perform the technique. In Shaolin kung fu, in addition, two-person forms are taught. In these two-person forms, attacks and defenses are performed one after the other. Each technique is followed by its counter, and the counter by its counter, and so on. These forms ensure perfect memorization and exact transmission of the techniques from generation to generation.

==== Combat styles ====
In addition to techniques, kung fu styles teach tactics. Tactics govern combination of techniques for better results. Because tactics are not specific techniques, they could not specifically be pre-coded into two-person practices and forms. In Shaolin kung fu, tactics are taught via solo forms (套路; tàolù). Every form teaches some related tactics, which altogether shape a strategy. In Shaolin, closely related forms are coupled together, and these couples are called the small and the big forms, like the small and big hong quan, which altogether make the Shaolin hong quan style, and the small and big pao quan, etc. There are also some styles with one form, like taizu chang quan. These styles each teach a unique strategy.

Shaolin kung fu includes hundreds of extant styles. There is recorded documentation of more than a thousand extant forms, which makes Shaolin the biggest school of martial art in the world. In the Qing dynasty (1644–1911), Shaolin monks chose 100 of the best styles of Shaolin kung fu. Then they shortlisted the 18 most famous of them. However, every lineage of Shaolin monks have always chosen their own styles. Every style teaches unique methods for fighting (散打; sàndǎ) and keeping health via one or a few forms. To learn a complete system, Shaolin monks master a number of styles and weapons. The most famous styles of Shaolin kung fu include:

- Arhat's 18 hands (罗汉十八手; luóhàn shíbā shǒu): known as the oldest style
- Flood style (洪拳; hóngquán): with the small form (小洪拳; xiǎo hóngquán) known as the son of the styles, and the big form (大洪拳; dà hóngquán) known as the mother of the styles
- 7-star & Long Guard the Heart and Mind Gate style (七星 & 长护心意门拳; qī xīng & cháng hù xīn yì mén quán),
- Explosive style (炮拳; pàoquán): known as the king of the styles
- Penetrating-Arms style (通臂拳; tōngbìquán)
- Plum Blossom style (梅花拳; méihuāquán)
- Facing & Bright Sun style (朝&昭 阳拳; cháo & zhāo yáng quán)
- Arhat style (罗汉拳; luóhànquán): known as the most representative style
- Emperor's Long-range style (太祖长拳; tàizǔ chángquán): known as the most graceful style
- Drunken style (醉拳; zuìquán)

== Internal and external kung fu ==
Huang Zongxi described martial arts in terms of Shaolin or "external" arts versus Wudang or internal arts in 1669. It has been since then that Shaolin has been popularly synonymous for what are considered the external Chinese martial arts, regardless of whether or not the particular style in question has any connection to the Shaolin Monastery. Some say that there is no differentiation between the so-called internal and external systems of the Chinese martial arts, while other well-known teachers hold the opinion that they are different. For example, the Taijiquan teacher Wu Jianquan:

Those who practice Shaolinquan leap about with strength and force; people not proficient at this kind of training soon lose their breath and are exhausted. Taijiquan is unlike this. Strive for quiescence of body, mind and intention.

== Influence on other martial arts ==
Some lineages of karate have oral traditions that claim Shaolin origins. Martial arts traditions in Japan, Korea, Sri Lanka and certain Southeast Asian countries cite Chinese influence as transmitted by Buddhist monks.

Recent developments in the 20th century such as Shorinji Kempo (少林寺拳法) practised in Japan's Sohonzan Shorinji (金剛禅総本山少林寺) still maintains close ties with China's Song Shan Shaolin Temple due to historic links. Japanese Shorinji Kempo Group received recognition in China in 2003 for their financial contributions to the maintenance of the historic edifice of the Song Shan Shaolin Temple.

== In popular culture ==
Several films have been produced, particularly during the 1970s and early 1980s, about Shaolin kung fu, including The 36th Chamber of Shaolin, The Shaolin Temple, and Shaolin Wooden Men. Modern films include Shaolin Soccer and Shaolin.

Shaolin has influenced numerous rappers, notably the members of Wu-Tang Clan.

Shaolin kung fu is one of the styles used by Mortal Kombat protagonist Liu Kang. His Pao Chui, Choy Lay Fut, Monkey Fist, and Dragon moves derive from Shaolin kung fu.

Shaolin monks (referred to simply as "monks" in-game) appear in the roguelike game NetHack, along with samurai. They are one of the two roles to use martial arts skills, with monks having the most powerful martial arts skills in the game.

In the Nickelodeon animated series Avatar: The Last Airbender, the practice of "firebending" is based on Shaolin moves.

The ABC TV series Kung Fu (1972–1975) stars David Carradine as a 19th century fugitive Shaolin monk traveling the Western United States in search of his brother. This series helped to popularize Shaolin kung fu with the general American TV audience.
