= Combat sport =

Competitive contact sport involving combat

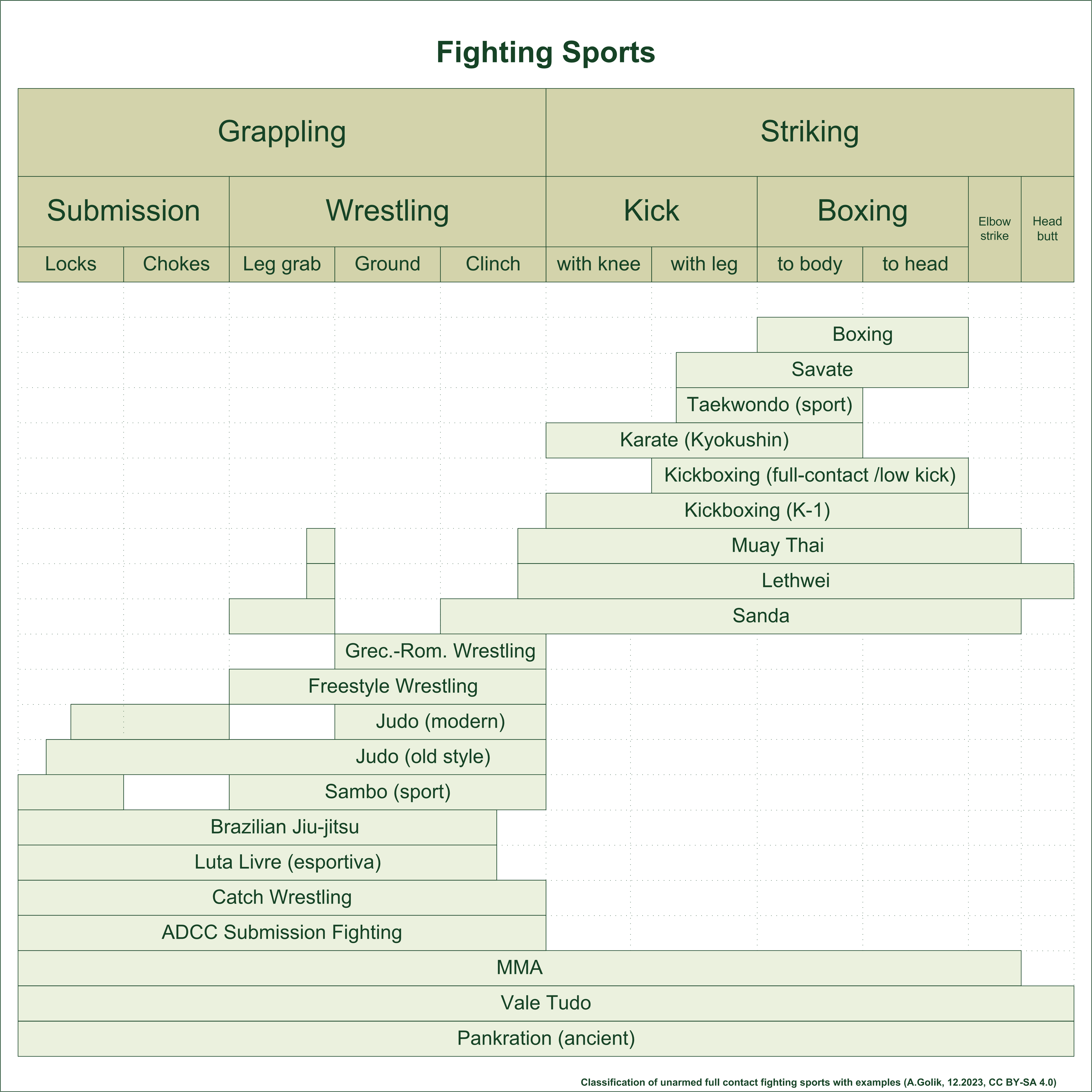
Classification of unarmed combat sports

A combat sport, or fighting sport, is a contact sport that usually involves one-on-one combat. In many combat sports, a contestant wins by scoring more points than the opponent, submitting the opponent with a hold, disabling the opponent (knockout, KO), or attacking the opponent in a specific or designated technique. Combat sports share a long history with the martial arts.

Combat sports and their national origin include (but are not limited to) boxing (Greek-British), Brazilian jiu-jitsu (Japanese-Brazilian), catch wrestling (British-American), jujutsu (Japanese), judo (Japanese), freestyle wrestling (British-American), Greco-Roman wrestling (French), karate (Chinese-Okinawan-Japanese), kickboxing (numerous origins, mainly Southeast Asian), Lethwei (Burmese), mixed martial arts (numerous origins), Muay Thai (Thai), sambo (Soviet/Russian), sanda (Chinese), savate (French), taekwondo (Korean), Vale Tudo (Brazilian), pankration (Ancient Greek), luta livre (Brazilian), and folk wrestling (various).

== History ==
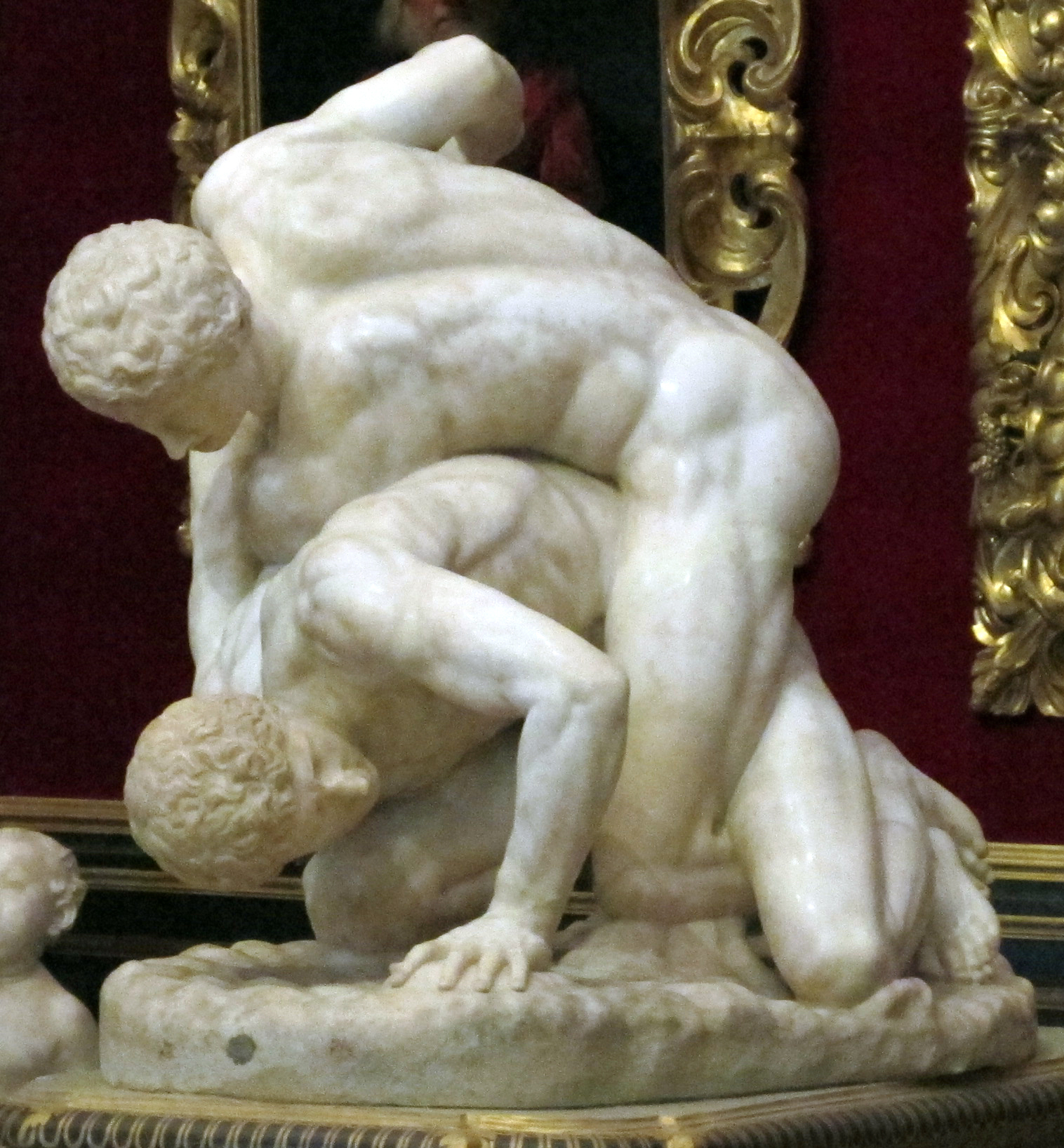
The Pancrastinae statue demonstrates the pancratium, which being similar to modern MMA featured a strong grappling element. This statue is a Roman copy of a lost Greek original, circa 3rd century BCE.

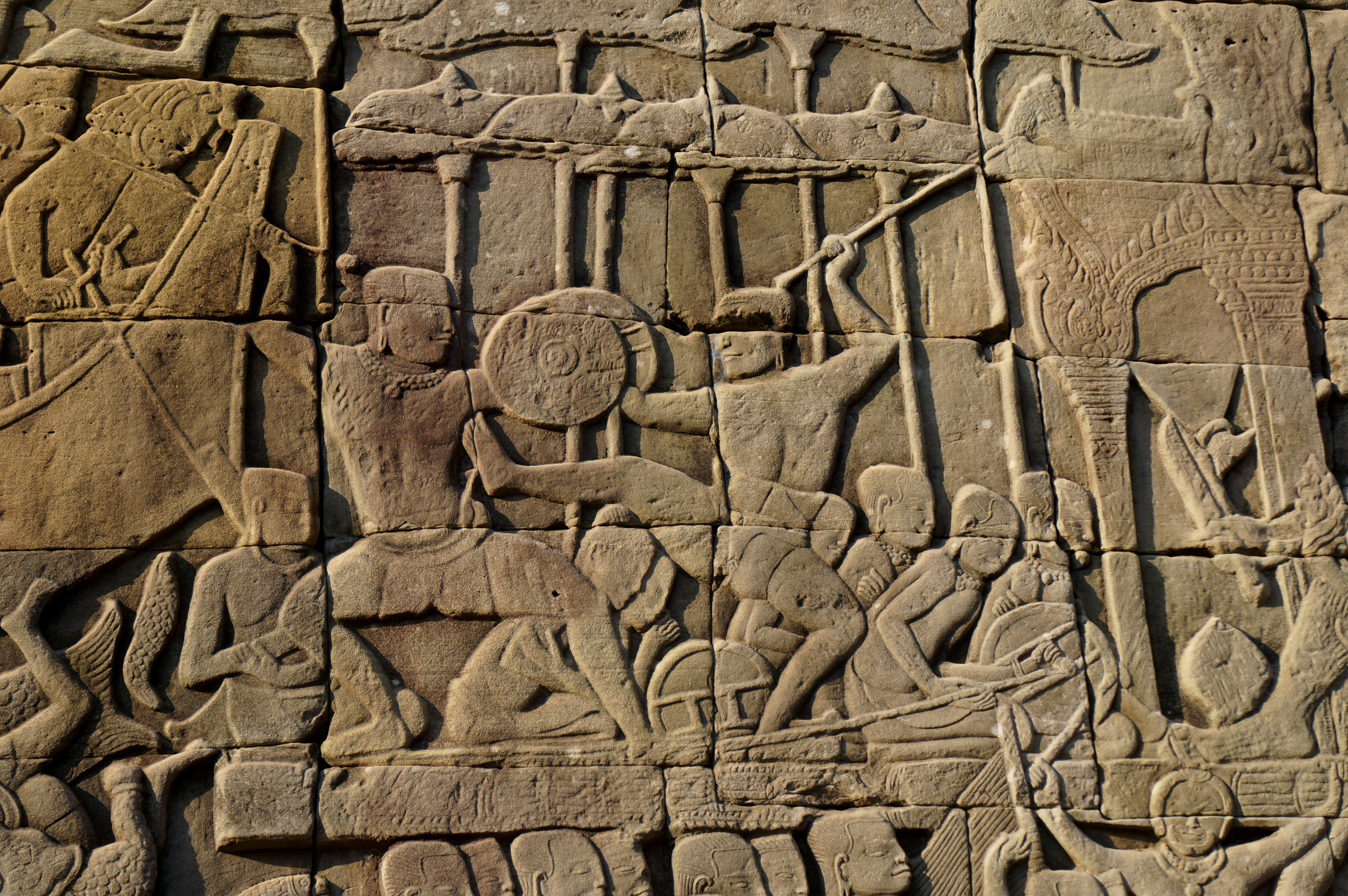
Two martial artists sparring in ancient Cambodia as depicted at the Bayon temple

Wrestling exists in most cultures, for it is the oldest existing sport that can be considered a cultural universal. While its foundational origins lie in global prehistory, various styles emerged independently throughout the world at various times in human history. Boxing contests date back to ancient Sumer in the 3rd millennium BCE and ancient Egypt circa 1350 BCE. The ancient Olympic Games included several combat-related sports: armored foot races, boxing, wrestling, and pankration, which was introduced in the Olympic Games of 648 BCE.

In ancient China, combat sport appeared in the form of lei tai. It was a no-holds barred combat sport that combined boxing and wrestling. There is evidence of similar combat sports in ancient Egypt, India and Japan.

Through the Middle Ages and Renaissance, the tournament was popular. Tournaments were competitions that featured several mock combat events, with jousting as a main event. While the tournament was popular among aristocrats, combat sports were practiced by all levels of society. The German school of late medieval martial arts distinguished sportive combat (schimpf) from serious combat (ernst). In the German Renaissance, sportive combat competitions were known as Fechtschulen, corresponding to the Prize Playing in Tudor England. Out of these Prize Playing events developed the English boxing (or prizefighting) of the 18th century, which evolved into modern boxing with the introduction of the Marquess of Queensberry rules in 1867.

Amateur boxing has been part of the modern Olympic Games since their introduction in 1904. Professional boxing became popular in the United States in the 1920s and experienced a "golden age" after World War II. Professional wrestling was once competitive catch wrestling, a legitimate combat sport in the late 19th and early 20th century, however it has since evolved into athletic theater.

The creation of Brazilian jiu-jitsu is attributed to the Gracie family of Brazil in 1925 after Asian martial arts were introduced to Brazil. Vale-tudo, wrestling, Muay Thai kickboxing and luta livre gained popularity. Modern Muay Thai was developed in the 1920s to 1930s. Sambo was introduced in the Soviet Union. Modern Taekwondo also emerged after the Japanese occupation of Korea and became an Olympic sport in 2000. Sanshou as part of modern wushu was developed in the People's Republic of China in the 1950s. Kickboxing and full contact karate were developed in the 1960s and became popular in Japan and the West during the 1980s and 1990s. Modern MMA developed out of the interconnected subcultures of Vale Tudo and shoot wrestling. It was introduced in Japan in the form of Shooto in 1985, and in the United States as Ultimate Fighting Championship (UFC) in 1993. The Unified Rules of Mixed Martial Arts were introduced in 2000, and the sport experienced peak popularity in the 2000s. During this period, multiple brands and promotions were established. The most well-known promotion for MMA is UFC.

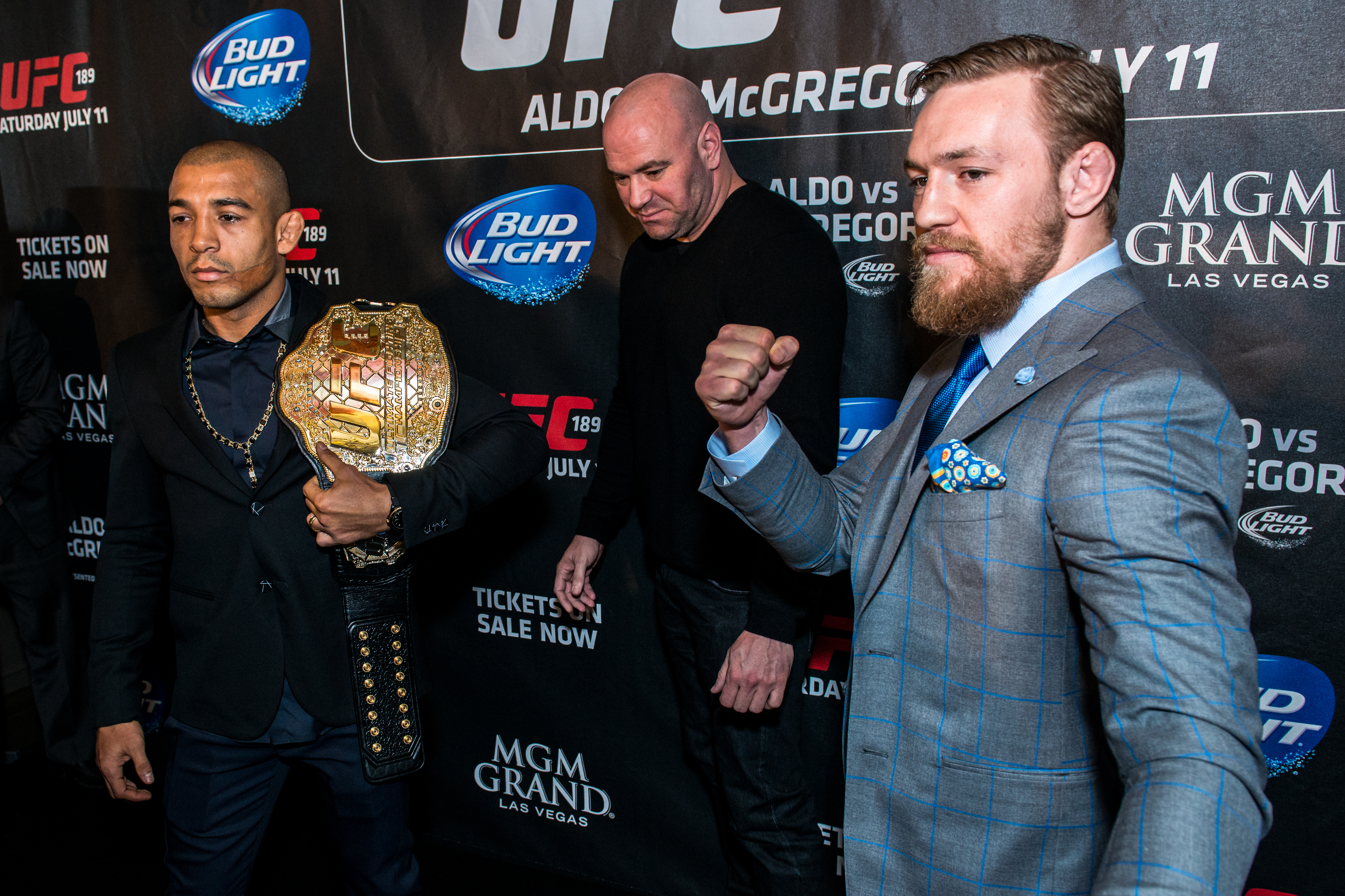
Conor McGregor, José Aldo, and Dana White at a press conference for the fight between McGregor and Aldo. This shows the two fighters posing for media, increasing revenue and interest in the fight.

== Popularity by gender ==
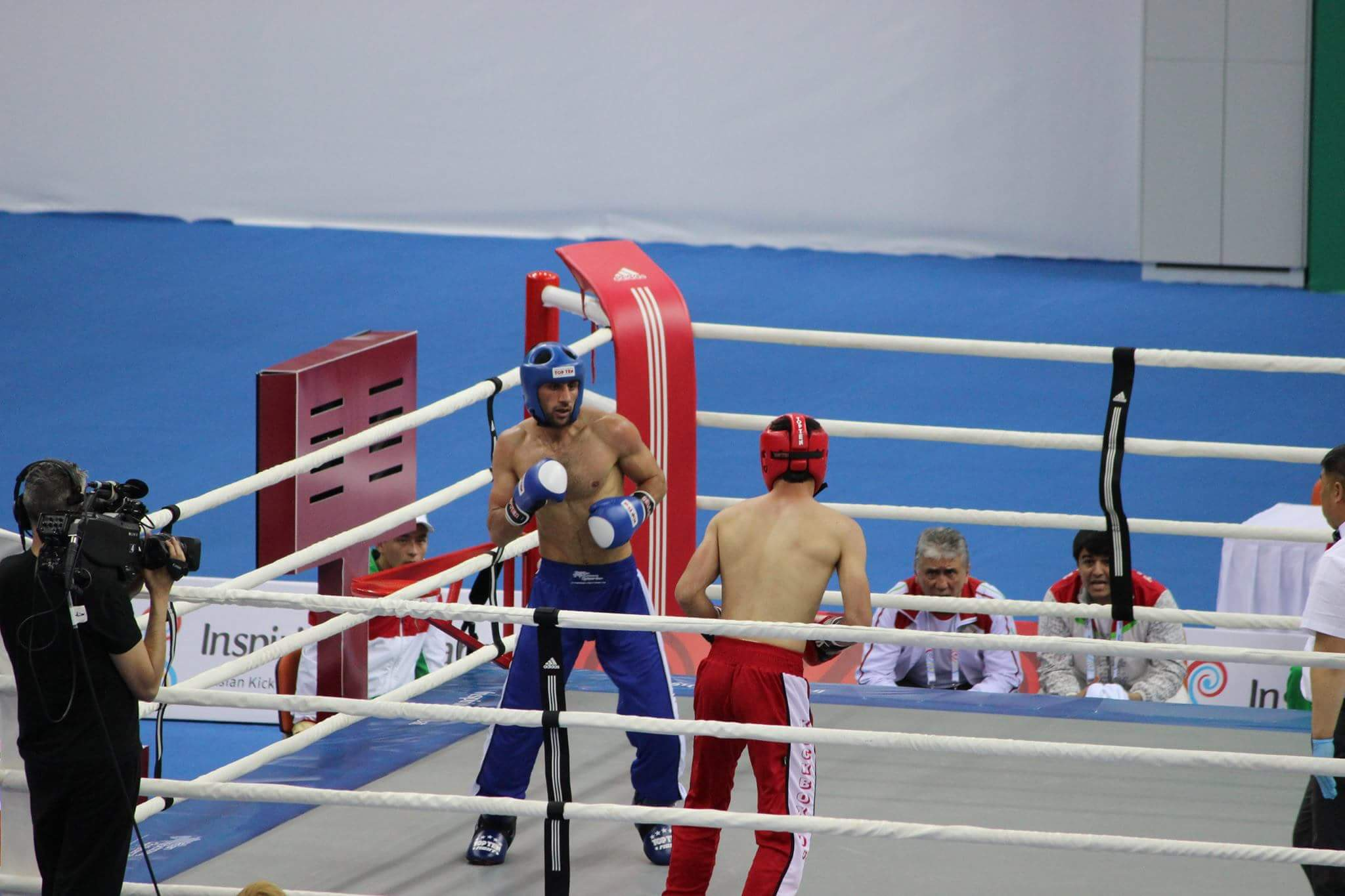
Iranian kickboxer, Hamid Amni, during the Asian Kickboxing Championships 2017

Combat sports are generally more popular among men as athletes and spectators. For many years, participation in combat sports was practically exclusive to men; USA Boxing had a ban on women's boxing until 1993. A study conducted by Greenwell, Hancock, Simmons, and Thorn in 2015 revealed that combat sports had a largely male audience.

== List ==
=== Unarmed ===
==== Striking ====
- Boxing and Kickboxing
  - Adimurai Kickboxing
  - American Boxing
  - American Kickboxing
  - Amateur Boxing
  - Armenian Boxing
  - Australian Boxing
  - Bare-knuckle Boxing
  - Bando Kickboxing
  - Chivarreto Boxing
  - Cuban Boxing
  - Dambe Boxing
  - Dutch Kickboxing
  - Enfusion Kickboxing
  - English Boxing
  - European Kickboxing
  - Filipino Boxing
  - Freestyle Kickboxing
  - Full Contact Kickboxing
  - Glory Kickboxing
  - Greek Boxing
  - Irish Boxing
  - Japanese Boxing
  - Japanese Kickboxing
  - K-1 Kickboxing
  - Kick Light Kickboxing
  - Kunguk-Do
  - Kyeok Too Ki
  - Light Contact Kickboxing
  - Mexican Boxing
  - Musangwe Boxing
  - New Zealand Kickboxing
  - Puerto Rican Boxing
  - Roman Boxing
  - Russian Boxing
  - Savate Kickboxing
  - Semi Contact Kickboxing
  - Unified Rules Kickboxing
- Karate
  - Shorin-ryu
  - Goju-ryu
  - Shotokan
  - Wadō-ryū
  - Kyokushin
  - Yoshukai
  - Bōgutsuki
  - Shito-ryu
  - Chito-ryu
  - Isshin-ryū
  - Uechi-ryu
  - Ryūei-ryū
  - Shōrei-ryū
  - Shohei-ryu
  - Tōon-ryū
  - Kenyu-ryu
  - Tokitsu-Ryu
  - Kuma-ryu
  - Washin-ryu
  - Shōrinji-ryū
  - Yoseikan-ryu
  - Shidōkan-ryu
  - Matsubayashi
  - Seidokaikan
  - Shōrinkan
  - Kyudōkan
  - Genseiryu
  - Shukokai
  - Shudokan
  - Bōgutsuki
  - Fudokan
  - Budokan
  - Seido Juku
  - Sankukai
  - Meibukan
  - Gohakukai
  - Koei Kan
- Wushu
  - Lung Ying
  - Hóu Quán
  - Zhōujiāquán
  - Bàoquán
  - Shéquán
  - Zuiquan
  - Bajiquan
  - Zi Ran Men
  - Bak Mei
  - Emeiquan
  - Mizongyi
  - Mian Quan
  - Ditangquan
  - Chuōjiǎo
  - Heihuquan
  - Changquan
  - Nanquan
  - Yiquan
  - Hung Fut
  - Duan Quan
  - Choy Gar
  - Li Gar
  - Mok Gar
  - Fut Gar
  - Chow Gar
  - Hung Ga
- Taekwondo
  - Traditional Taekwondo
  - World Taekwondo
  - ITF taekwondo
  - STF Taekwondo
  - ATA Taekwondo
  - Rhee Taekwondo
  - Kukkiwon Taekwondo
  - Extreme Taekwondo
  - Kong Soo Do
  - Chung Do Kwan
  - Chang Moo Kwan
  - Jidokwan
- Tang Soo Do
  - Soo Bahk Do
  - Moo Duk Kwan
- Suntukan
- Sikaran
- Capoeira
- Engolo
- Taido
- Kyeok Sul

==== Grappling ====
- Folk wrestling
  - Alysh
  - Backhold wrestling
  - Barróg
  - Bokh
  - Buriad bokh
  - Bukh noololdoon
  - Bultong
  - Buno
  - Canarian wrestling
  - Calegon
  - Calegon wrestling
  - Chidaoba
  - Coreeda
  - Collar-and-elbow wrestling
  - Cornish wrestling
  - Cumberland Wrestling
  - Devon wrestling
  - Dumog
  - Epoo Korio
  - Fagatua
  - Galhofa
  - Gatta Gusthi
  - Glima
  - Gorës
  - Gouren
  - Gushtingiri
  - Hokoko
  - Huka-huka
  - Iranian wrestling
  - Jobbarer Boli Khela
  - Karakucak
  - Kene
  - Khuresh
  - Khmer traditional wrestling
  - Khridoli
  - Kazakh wrestling
  - Kragkast
  - Kene
  - Kragkast
  - Kurash
  - Lutte Traditionnelle
  - Lancashire wrestling
  - Leonese wrestling
  - Malakhra
  - Mariwariwosu
  - Moana wrestling
  - Mukna
  - Naban
  - Narodno rvanje
  - Norfolk wrestling
  - Pehlwani
  - Popoko
  - Ristynės
  - Ringen
  - Rongomamau
  - Sa Strumpa
  - Schwingen
  - Southern Mongolian wrestling
  - Ssireum
  - Sumo
  - Tegumi
  - Tigel
  - Trântă
  - Taupiga
  - Vajra-mushti
  - Veibo
  - Vật cổ truyền
  - Westmorland wrestling
- Modern wrestling
  - Amateur wrestling
  - Catch wrestling
  - Collegiate wrestling
  - Combat wrestling
  - Freestyle Wrestling
  - Greco-Roman wrestling
  - Greek wrestling
  - Hayastan wrestling
  - Scholastic wrestling
- Jujutsu and Judo
  - Japanese jiu-jitsu
  - Sport jujutsu
  - International jiu-jitsu
  - Gracie ju-jitsu
  - Machado ju-jitsu
  - Brazilian jiu-jitsu
  - 10th Planet jiu-jitsu
  - Guerrilla jiu-jitsu
  - American Jiu-Jitsu
  - Hakko-ryu jiu-jitsu
  - Gyokushin-ryū Jujutsu
  - Shorinji Kan Jiu Jitsu
  - Kodokan Judo
  - Kosen Judo
  - IJF Judo
  - Olympic Judo
  - Freestyle Judo
  - Azerbaijani Judo
  - Israeli Judo
  - Mongolian Judo
  - French Judo
  - Georgian Judo
  - Russian Judo
  - Korean Judo
  - Brazilian Judo
- Kung Fu
  - Chin Na
  - Shuai Jiao
  - Die Jiao
  - Gi Ge
  - Qielixi
  - Ndrual Dluad
  - Beiga
- Sambo
  - Sport Sambo
  - Freestyle Sambo
- Submission wrestling
- Luta Livre Esportiva
- Aikido

==== Hybrid ====
- Mixed martial arts
- Karate
  - Kenko Kempo Karate
  - Kūdō
  - Shidokan Karate
  - Tenshinkan Karate
  - Tsuroka Karate
  - Ashihara kaikan
  - Enshin kaikan
  - Byakuren Kaikan
  - Kendokai Kendokan
  - Shōrinjiryū Kenkōkan
  - Okinawa Seidokan
  - Shindo Jinen-ryu
  - Shōbayashi Shōrin-ryū
  - Wado-ryu
  - Shuri-ryu
  - Gosoku-ryu
  - Sankukai
  - Sanshinkai
  - Zendokai
  - Nanbudo
  - Kokondo
  - Kansuiryu
  - Seigokan
- Boxing and Kickboxing
  - Ancient Bare-Knuckle Boxing
  - Yaw-Yan Kickboxing
  - Shoot Boxing
  - Pradal Serey Kickboxing
  - Lethwei Boxing
  - Musti-yuddha Kickboxing
  - Moraingy Boxing
  - Draka Kickboxing
  - Xtreme Gladiator
  - Muay Thai
  - Muay Lao
  - Muay Boran
  - Muay Korat
  - Muay Lopburi
  - Muay Thasao
  - Muay Chaiya
- Jujutsu and Judo
  - Japanese jujutsu
  - Combat jiu-jitsu
  - German Ju-Jitsu
  - Atemi Ju-Jitsu
  - Danzan-ryu Ju-Jitsu
  - Hokutoryu Ju-Jutsu
  - Small Circle JuJitsu
  - Budoshin Ju-Jitsu
  - Daitō-ryū Aiki-jūjutsu
  - Kyushin-ryū Ju-Jitsu
  - Kito-ryu Ju-Jitsu
  - Fudo-ryu Ju-Jitsu
  - Kick Jiu Jitsu
  - Taijutsu
  - Atemi Judo
- Aikido
  - Real Aikido
  - Shodokan Aikido
  - Yoshinkan
  - Renshinkai
  - Aikikai
  - Ki Aikido
- Hapkido
  - Combat Hapkido
  - Sin Moo Hapkido
  - Hankido
  - Kuk Sool Won
  - Hapki yusul
- Modern Wrestling
  - Combat Submission Wrestling
  - Shoot Wrestling
  - Shooto
  - Shootfighting
  - Submission Arts Wrestling
- Wushu
  - Sanda Sanshou
  - Nan Pai Tanglang
  - Tánglángquán
  - Pe̍h-ho̍h-kûn
  - Huaquan
  - Yuejiaquan
  - Wing Chun
  - Fu Jow Pai
  - Choy Li Fut
  - Eagle Claw
- Taekkyon
  - Sport Taekkyon
  - Yetbeop Taekkyon
- Kempo
  - Kosho Shorei-Ryū Kenpo
  - Nippon Kempo
  - American Kenpo
  - Shorinji Kempo
  - Okinawan Kempo
  - Kara-Ho Kempo
  - Shaolin Kempo
  - Ryūkyū Kempo
  - Ryū-te
- Folk wrestling
  - Pi'i tauva
  - Inbuan
  - Malla-yuddha
  - Senegalese wrestling
- Sambo
  - Combat sambo
  - Full Contact Fighting Sambo
- ARB
- Pankration
  - Modern Pankration
  - Ancient Pankration
- Gaidojutsu
- GongKwon Yusul
- Kyukgido
- Kajukenbo
- Vale tudo
- Luta Livre
- Combat Hopak
- Angampora
- American Tang Soo Do
- Choi Kwang Do
- Hup Kwon Do
- Han Moo Do
- Han Mu Do
- Subak
- Teuk Gong Moo Sool
- Yongmudo

=== Armed ===
- Bladed weapons
  - Academic fencing
  - Fechtschule
  - Fencing
  - Historical European martial arts
  - Armored combat (sport)
  - Kendo
  - Kumdo
- Stick-fighting
  - Bâton français
  - Quarterstaff
  - Singlestick
- Hastilude
  - Arnis
  - Competitive jousting
- Shooting sports
  - Airsoft
  - Paintball

== Techniques ==
The techniques used can be categorized into three domains: striking, grappling, and weapon usage, with some hybrid rule-sets combining striking and grappling. In combat sports the use of these various techniques are highly regulated to minimize permanent or severe physical damage to each participant though means of organized officiating by a single or multiple referees that can distribute penalties or interrupt the actions of the competitors during the competition. In weapon based sports, the weapons used are made to be non-lethal by means of modifying the striking portions of the weapon and requiring participants to wear protective clothing/armor.

== Olympics ==
- Amateur boxing (1904–1908, 1916-2024): Boxing has been staged at every summer Olympic games since 1904 except Stockholm in 1912 due to Swedish law.
- Judo (1964, 1972–2024): Judo was not included in the 1968 Mexico City summer Olympics. Women's judo was added to the Olympics in 1992 in Barcelona.
- Taekwondo (1988 Seoul Games as demonstration sport, 2000–2024): Became an official medal sport at the 2000 Sydney Olympic Games.
- Wrestling Greco-Roman (1908–2024): The first form of wrestling to be held at the Olympic Games. At the Olympics, this is a men-only event.
- Wrestling Freestyle (1920–2024): Was modified at the 2000 Sydney Games and reduced the amount of weight categories provided. Freestyle wrestling has separate woman and men events.
- Pankration and singlestick are two other forms of combat sports that have been included in the Olympics. These combat sports were introduced to the Olympic Games in the early 1900s however singlestick was only represented at the 1904 Olympic games and pankration whilst lasting four centuries in Ancient Greek Olympia's, was not included at all after 1900.
- Fencing (1896–2024): Competitive fencing is one of the five activities which have been featured in every modern Olympic Games, the other four being athletics, cycling, swimming, and gymnastics.
- Olympic dueling (1906–1908): Demonstration sport at the 1906 Olympics and 1908 Olympics.
- Karate (2020): Karate made its Olympic debut for Tokyo 2020 under new IOC rules.

== Protective gear and clothing ==
In combat sports, victory is obtained from blows, punches or attacks to the head to a point of physical injury that the opponent is unable to continue. Different forms of combat sport have different rules and regulations into the equipment competitors have to wear. In Amateur boxing seen at the Olympics, competitors are permitted to wear head guards and correctly weighted padded gloves, mouth guards are optional and the canvas floor protection from a hard fall. In sports such as Taekwondo, competitors are permitted to wear a trunk protector, head guard, gloves, groin guard and shin and forearm pads. Professional boxing and MMA are two of the most dangerous combat sports in the world due to the lack of protective gear worn (compared to the protected fists). Competitors in these two sports have the option to wear a mouthguard and must wear suitable gloves. The lack of protective clothing makes competitors vulnerable to concussions and further traumatic head injuries. A scientific experiment, conducted in 2015 by Dr Andrew McIntosh of ACRISP at the Federation University of Australia, tested the impact of seven different head guards in combat sport. The results of the experiment revealed the benefits of the combination of a glove and headguard in maximising the impact energy attenuation. A study conducted by Lystad showed that combat sports with little to no protective gear such as MMA or boxing has an injury incidence rate range of 85.1–280.7 per 1000 athletes in comparison to another striking combat sport like Taekwondo which has a large amount of protective gear such as pads, headgear, mouth guard and gloves, has an injury incidence rate range of 19.1–138.8 per 1000 athletes. This means that injury rates are drastically lowered when protective gear is used.

Gear includes:

- Gloves
- Headgear
- Mouthguard
- Shin guards
- Arm guards
- Groin guard
- Trunk guard
- Wraps (material wrapped around the hand and wrist (and/or foot and ankle) that provides added alignment, support and protection)

== Fighting area ==
- Mat

- circular layout or rectangular layout

- Ring

- with ropes around the fighting area

- boxing ring
- wrestling ring

- without ropes around the fighting area

- pit: A circle 27 feet in diameter, of which the inner 24 feet is colored blue. The next 3 feet is yellow, which is the caution area. When the fighter gets to the yellow area, he know they are getting close to stepping out-of-bounds. The last edge of the ring is the red zone, which features a 30-degree upward angle. When a fighter steps on the red area, they are stepping up slightly, letting them know they are out-of-bounds.
- sumo ring (dohyō), sand ring

- Fenced area (generically referred to as a "cage")
  - Can be round or have at least six sides. The fenced area is generally called a cage or more precisely, depending on the shape, a hexagon (if it has 6 sides) or an octagon (if it has 8 sides).
  - Some replace the metal fencing with a net.

== See also ==
- Blood sport
- Hand-to-hand combat
- Hoplology
- List of boxing films
- List of martial arts films
- Mixed martial arts
