= Gene Chen =

American martial artist (1938–2001)

Gene Chen 陳進鴻
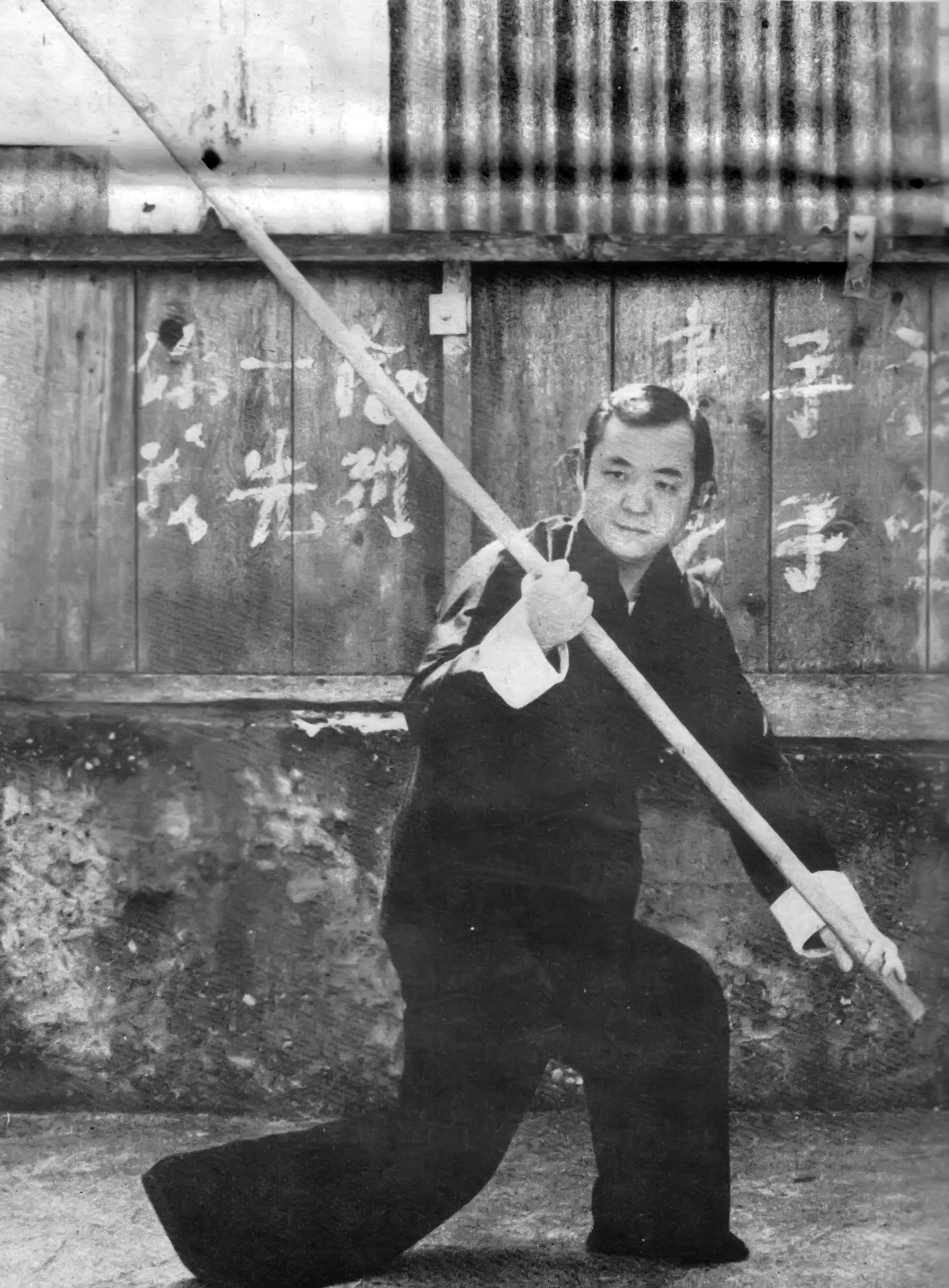
- Born: 1 August 1938; Shanghai, China
- Died: 5 June 2001 (aged 62); San Francisco, California, U.S.
- Other names: Eugene Chen
- Nationality: Chinese; American
- Style: Chen-style tai chi, Southern Praying Mantis

Other information
- Occupation: Martial artist

Gene Chen
- Traditional Chinese: 陳進鴻
Transcriptions
Standard Mandarin
- Hanyu Pinyin: Chén Jìnhóng
- Wade–Giles: Chen Ching Hong

Gene Chen (1 August 1938 – 5 June 2001) was a Chinese American martial artist. Though he was knowledgeable in many Chinese martial arts, he was a master in Chu Gar Southern Praying Mantis and Chen-style tai chi.

== Early life ==
Gene Chen was born in Shanghai 1938, the Year of the Tiger. He lived there with his father, mother, two older sisters and two younger brothers until the family fled to Hong Kong due to the Chinese Communist Revolution following World War II.

As a boy, Gene and his younger brothers would often be surrounded and harassed by neighborhood bullies when walking home from school. Gene stood his ground and did what he could to protect his younger brothers. Since these bullies had learned martial arts, Gene decided that he needed to learn a system that he could use to defeat them. He approached Chu Yu Hing's top disciple, Dong Yet Long and asked to learn Chu Gar Southern Mantis style. Master Dong was a cook at a local school when young Gene first met him. Master Dong initially refused to teach, denying any knowledge of martial arts. Gene was persistent though, and after making offerings of chicken, pork and wine, with his mother by his side, he was finally accepted as a student. Shortly after, Gene was introduced to Chu Yu Hing, and for the next for 7 years, under their tutelage; he patiently devoted himself to learning Southern Praying Mantis. He had discovered his lifelong passion for martial arts.

== Move to America ==
In 1959, along with his family, Gene Chen moved to the US and settled in San Francisco. On the boat trip across the Pacific Ocean, he met Choi Gam Man, a student of Yi Sui, Master of Chow Gar Southern Praying Mantis. He asked Choi to teach him Chow Gar, but as Choi's purpose in going to America was to join his father Choi Hok Peng to help teach Yang-style tai chi, he would not teach Mantis. He did agree to teach Gene Yang's tai chi and they passed the long trip days practicing martial arts together.

Over the decades that followed, Gene worked to make a living and to save money for his return trips to study in China. He was trained as a drafter and had an impeccable hand, but disliked being confined inside an office and having to wear a starched shirt and tie. Eventually he left drafting and took a series of odd jobs to make money, such as serving as a translator for Vietnamese refugees and working as a bellhop. Gene was so focused on his martial arts that when his job was a shipping receiver in one of the Jack Tar Hotels' loading dock, he installed his wooden dummy in a nearby storeroom so he could get in some extra practice when things were slow. Over the years he took many extended trips back to Hong Kong, often staying for 6 months at a time to get intensive training with Yi Sui, Chu Yu Hing and Dong Yet Long. In 1970 Master Dong conferred on Gene Chen the title of Chief Instructor with certificate and Chu Yu Hing granted the title of Instructor with certificate in 1971. With his certificates in hand, he began his career as a martial arts teacher. In 1971, Gene opened his first school in the Richmond District, San Francisco. When the rent got too high at the first location, they relocated class to the basement of a local Japanese church. However, the school still was not providing the financial return on his time and effort that Gene desired and he closed it for good in 1975. He continued to teach Yang's tai chi, Southern Praying Mantis and Wing Chun at his house through 1980. During these years Gene especially enjoyed going out to different martial arts schools to test himself against other martial artists and other fighting styles. His Praying mantis training served him very well in these encounters.

== Family life ==
Family was very important to Gene and he remained close to his relatives all his life even though their interactions were often contentious and dramatic. He was always ready to help out his siblings, whether it was taking care of his sister's rental properties or driving his old VW Beetle down to Los Angeles to help his brother move. Gene took his role as the eldest son very seriously and even remodeled the lower floor of his house to make a comfortable room for his mother to live. For the better part of 20 years she lived at his home. Eventually Gene settled down and married. His only child, a daughter was born the next year. Near the end of his life, Gene confided to his brother that the best times in his life were practicing martial arts with his students and seeing his wife and daughter happy.

== Chen style ==
In 1980 Chen decided to stop teaching the Southern Mantis because its focus on fighting means that it is not suitable to teach to everyone. Having resolved to give up publicly teaching Southern Mantis, he decided to pursue his study of tai chi. He was already familiar with Yang's tai chi, and several years earlier (in 1965) he learned the Chen-style tai chi from his grandparents' former bodyguard. On his return trips to China Gene sought out the best tai chi teachers he could find. After additional training in Yang's tai chi with Master Fu Zhongwen and Wu-style tai chi with Master Ma Yueliang, Gene began to study the Chen's Style with Lei Munyi and Chen Zhaokui, the 18th generation Grand Master.

In 1980 Chen Zhaokui introduced Gene to Feng Zhiqiang. A few days later, Master Feng came to visit Gene in his hotel and the two men practiced pushing hands together. After his return to the US, Gene Chen received a letter from Feng. In the letter, Master Feng noted Chen had natural ability, sensitivity and the relaxation to learn well. He praised Gene for his years of hard work and encouraged him to continue his practice.

The following year, 1981, Chen Zhaokui died. When Gene returned to China later in the year he chose to continue his tai chi study with Master Feng. Since Feng was still working at his job in the machine shop, Gene took evening lessons at Feng's home in the Zhong Wen Area of Beijing. In 1982 Gene Chen was honored to become Master Feng's very first disciple. Gene practiced hard and returned to China to visit Feng (and also to Chen's Village) many times to continue his studies. In recognition of his achievements in Chen's tai chi, Gene Chen's name was included on a memorial tablet in the Chen Village during a ceremony in 1990. This tablet recounts the history of the Chen's Martial Art and lists his name among the most high-ranking practitioners of the style. During these travels Gene also trained additionally in Wu-style taijiquan with Master Wang Peisheng, and spent time learning from Chen Yuxia (Daughter of Chen Fake) and Hong Junsheng as well.

== Return to teaching ==
Gene formed the Chen's Tai Chi Association USA in 1982. For many years his school would meet in the evenings at the Fort Mason Center and on the weekends in Golden Gate Park. He taught a complete curriculum including the first and second sets, qigong, pushing hands, weapons, the 8 energies, philosophy and history. He placed a special emphasis on developing root, peng and a proper centerline in all the moves of the set. In the martial practice, he emphasized using an undetectable interception, catching of the opponent's energy and unbalancing them before issuing fa jin.

His teachings went far beyond just martial arts, however. Gene referred to tai chi as the art of all arts – an art that was based on the very principles of nature. Whether it was playing basketball, buying clothing or sitting down to eat dim sum, he would always give something of the Taiji philosophy. Through his embodiment and explanation of the Taiji philosophy, he taught things that could be applied to daily life: how to flow gracefully with the ups and downs of life and to enjoy the simple pleasures along the way. He taught that in life, nothing is 100%, for everything changes, and even the most desperate situation contains a seed of growth and hope.

It was always a goal of Gene's to write a book about Chen's tai chi, to help explain its history and principles to a Western audience. Working with a group of students, he did put together and outline of the book and a series of extensive lecture notes that would serve as the chapters, but he ultimately never finished the project. Throughout the years he did however have multiple articles published in national martial arts magazines including, Inside Kung Fu, the Tai Chi Journal and China Sport.
