= Genseiryū Karate-do International Federation =

Governing body of the sport karate

The Genseiryū Karate-do International Federation (GKIF) (国際玄制流空手道連盟), Butokukai Branch (武徳会支部) was established in 1959 by Kunihiko Tosa and junior co-worker Yohimitsu Furuya who both were part of the first dojo ever established by Seiken Shukumine at the Tachikawa Self Defense Forces.

== First Meeting ==
Around 1950, Kunihiko Tosa joined the Japanese Self-Defense Forces. During the years of the JSDF, Kunihiko Tosa met the founder of Genseiryū, Seiken Shukumine, for the first time.

"There was a sports day at the JSDF. In the competition of high jumping, a man jumped over the bar after taking just two steps back. He landed with in a cat's stance (Neko-ashi-dachi). The person was Seiken Shukumine, who at that time was an officer of the storage management section. A few days later, Kunihiko Tosa met Shukumine again and asked him if he was doing karate. Shukumine said nothing but took Kunihiko Tosa to the back of a storage. Suddenly Seiken Shukumine jumped over Kunihiko Tosa's head just like in that high jump. When Kunihiko Tosa looked back at Seiken Shukumine, he faced a finger strike (Nuki-te) to his throat. Kunihiko Tosa could not help but ask Seiken Shukumine on the spot to instruct him in karate. At that time Seiken Shukumine had not yet named his style Genseiryū. There was not a well organized dojo, but only a small group of people who recognized Seiken Shukumine's incredibly talented techniques. Seiken Shukumine and his companions created Genseiryū's original katas in those days. Needless to say, that Kunihiko Tosa was one of the participating members." -Kunihiko Tosa

== History ==
Seiken Shukumine, the founder of Genseiryū accepted his first student, Kunihiko Tosa, in 1952. Seiken Shukumine and Kunihiko Tosa among others worked together on establishing the Genseiryū organization. Seiken Shukumine switched to Taidō in 1962, but Kunihiko Tosa continued promoting Genseiryū in Japan as well as internationally.

The Ōizumi Gakuen, Tokyo honbu dojo (supreme headquarters) was established in 1959 by Kunihiko Tosa. This dojo was named Butokukai and became the honbu dojo of the Genseiryū Karate-do International Federation that same year. In 1965 an additional dojo was built in Asaka, Saitama Prefecture. Although the Ōizumi Gakuen, Tokyo dojo still exists today, the supreme headquarters was moved from Ōizumi Gakuen, Tokyo to the new Asaka building in 1965.

The Genseiryū organisation founded by Seiken Shukumine in 1953 was dissolved in late 1961 or early 1962. This is also partly the reason for Kunihiko Tosa to establish the new headquarters of the GKIF in Asaka (Japan) in 1965. This building is the official headquarters and honbu dojo of the GKIF.

The Genseiryū Karate-do International Federation has about 150 dojos worldwide, but most of them are in Japan. Kunihiko Tosa is the Saiko-Shihan (grand master) and president of the organization. Kunihiko Tosa was awarded the 9th dan by the GKIF, while the Japan Karatedo Federation (JKF) recognizes the 8th dan.

== Literature ==
=== Genseiryū Karate-do Kyōhan ===
Kunihiko Tosa wrote and published a book on Genseiryū in 1984. The book is titled: 玄制流空手道教範2 - 型編 ("Genseiryū Karatedō Kyōhan 2 - kata hen" or: "The teachings of Genseiryu Karatedo 2 - kata collection") and contains a preface by Seiken Shukumine (1925–2001). The book contains pictures and detailed descriptions of the nine official advanced kata of Genseiryū (a total of 23 kata are taught and practiced in Genseiryū as part of the official curriculum). The versions of the kata in this book are the versions officially recognized in Japan by the Japan Karate-do Federation (JKF).

==== Volume 2 ====
The author, Kunihiko Tosa, initially planned a 2 volume series, one containing the basics of Genseiryū and the other containing the advanced kata. Due to the costs of issuing two volumes at that time (early 1980s), Kunihiko Tosa decided to first issue the sequel considering, that a book containing the advanced kata was much more needed than a book about the basics. Kunihiko Tosa is planning to publish the first volume at a later date, thus completing the Genseiryū volumes 1 and 2.

== Curriculum ==
The GKIF include the following in its curriculum divided into two sections, one for juniors and one for seniors.

- Shiho Tsuki Keri, Shiho Nuki and Happo Nuki.

=== Kata ===
==== Kihon Kata ====
- Heian Shodan, Heian Nidan, Heian Sandan, Heian Yondan and Heian Godan.

==== Tanren Kata ====
- Naihanchi, Wankan, Bassai, Bassai Sho, Sansai, Rohai, Koshokun Dai, Koshokun Sho and Chinto.

==== Shitei Kata ====
As officially defined by the Japan Karate-do Federation.

- Jion, Kanku Dai, Bassai Dai, Seienchin.
- Nipaipo, Kanku Sho and Enpi.

==== Kobudo kata ====
- Bō Jutsu Kihon Kata, Bo Jutsu Kumite Kata, Nunchaku Kihon Kata and Nunchaku Kumite Kata.

== Worldwide Headquarters ==
- GKIF World Headquarters, Japan
- Brazil & South America
- Dominica
- Denmark, Europe Headquarters
- Australia
- Sri Lanka
- India
