= Thomas Greenwell =

Thomas Greenwell may refer to:

- Thomas George Greenwell (1894–1967), British politician
- Tom Greenwell (1956–2013), judge in Texas, United States
