= World Genseiryū Karatedō Federation =

Governing body of sport karate

World Genseiryū Karatedō Federation (WGKF) is an international karate organization established in 2003.

Instructors from several countries, including Denmark, the Netherlands, Spain, Finland and Japan, met in Oviedo, Spain in November, 2003, for purposes of establishing the World Genseiryū Karatedō Federation. At the end of the meeting, on November 14, the parties signed an agreement promising, among other things, to follow Seiken Shukumine's book Shin Karatedō Kyōhan (published 1964), which the WGKF considers the original Genseiryū, as a training guideline. Ten-i, Chi-i and Jin-i are considered by the WGKF to be among the basic and most essential kata of the organization's curriculum. Some instructors from within the WGKF have chosen to also practice and teach other kata such as Heian (basic kata from Shotokan), kata that are not included in the official curriculum. None of these instructors have rejected any of the kata mentioned in the book Shin Karatedō Kyōhan.

Currently, the President of the WGKF is Yasunori Kanai, Vice-President is Rodolfo S. Alonso and the Director-General is Nobuaki Konno.

Seiken Shukumine (1925–2001) founded both Genseiryū (in 1950) and Taidō (in 1965). Since 1962 Shukumine involved himself mainly with matters related to Taidō., but he also stayed involved in Genseiryu karate He received the title of Grand Master (Saikō-Shihan) of Genseiryū, which he carried until his death in 2001. He appointed several former students, as teachers and to operate the Genseiryū schools as the Head Master/President. The first was Yamada (one of Shukumine's first students) in 1968, later followed by Haruo Saito.

The Nippon Karate Budō Kyōkai, which takes part in the World Genseiryū Karatedō Federation (WGKF), has Yasunori Kanai as the president of both. The Nippon Karate Budō Kyōkai took up the role as honbu (本部, headquarters) of the World Genseiryū Karatedō Federation with the office located in Itō, Japan. Seiken Shukumine lived in Ito for many years and was eventually buried there.
