= Greenwell =

Greenwell is an English surname. Notable people with the surname include:

== Arts and entertainment ==
- Dora Greenwell (1821–1882), English poet
- Emma Greenwell (born 1989), American actress
- Garth Greenwell (born 1978), American poet, author, literary critic, and educator
- Mary Greenwell (active 2025), British make-up artist
- Peter Greenwell (1929–2006), English composer and pianist

== Sport ==
- Don Greenwell (1924–2002), English footballer, played one game for York City
- Jack Greenwell (1884–1942), English footballer and manager, notably for Barcelona
- Mike Greenwell (1963–2025), American baseball player
- Rebecca Greenwell (born 1995), American basketball player
- Ross Greenwell (born 1998), English cricketer

== Other ==
- Andrew Greenwell (born 1983), American real estate broker and reality TV personality
- Ashlee Greenwell (born 1988), American beauty queen
- Carlyle Greenwell (1884–1961), Australian architect
- George Clementson Greenwell (1821–1900), British mining engineer
- Harry Edward Greenwell (1944–2013), American serial killer
- Henry Nicholas Greenwell (1826–1891), English merchant who sold Kona coffee, founder of the Greenwell Store
- Joe Greenwell (born 1951), British business executive
- Leonard Greenwell (1781–1844), British Major-general
- Richard Greenwell (1942–2005), British cryptozoologist and explorer
- Thomas George Greenwell (1894–1967), British Member of Parliament
- Tom Greenwell (1956–2013), judge in the U.S. state of Texas
- William Greenwell (1820–1918), English archaeologist and Church of England priest

== See also ==
- Amy B. H. Greenwell Ethnobotanical Garden, Hawaii, U.S.
- Greenwell baronets, a title in the Baronetage of the United Kingdom, created in 1906
- Greenwell, a hamlet in Cumberland, Cumbria, England
- Greenwell Glacier, Antarctica
- Greenwell Matongo (suburb), a suburb in the city of Windhoek, Namibia
- Greenwell Point, New South Wales, an inhabited place in Australia
- Greenwell Springs, Louisiana, an unincorporated community in the U.S. state of Louisiana
- Greenwell State Park, in the U.S. state of Maryland
- Greenwell Store, a historic building in the U.S. state of Hawaii
- Kent Budden & Greenwell, an Australian architectural practice in Sydney, New South Wales 1913–1919
