= Leonese wrestling =

Form of wrestling in the Province of León, Spain

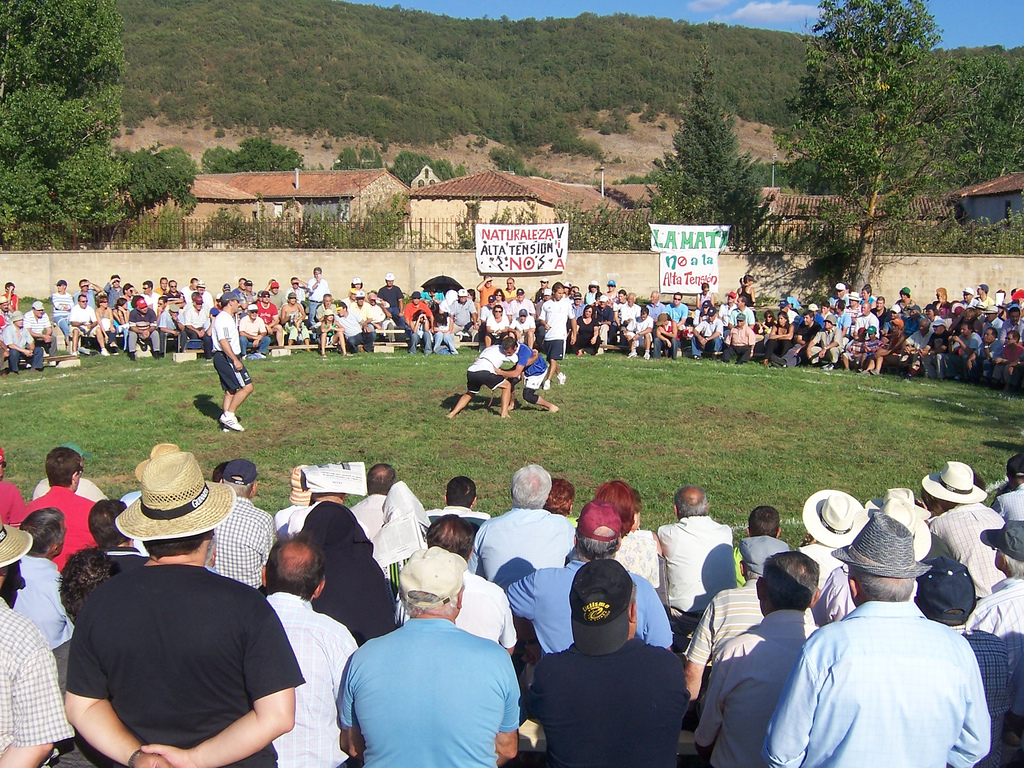

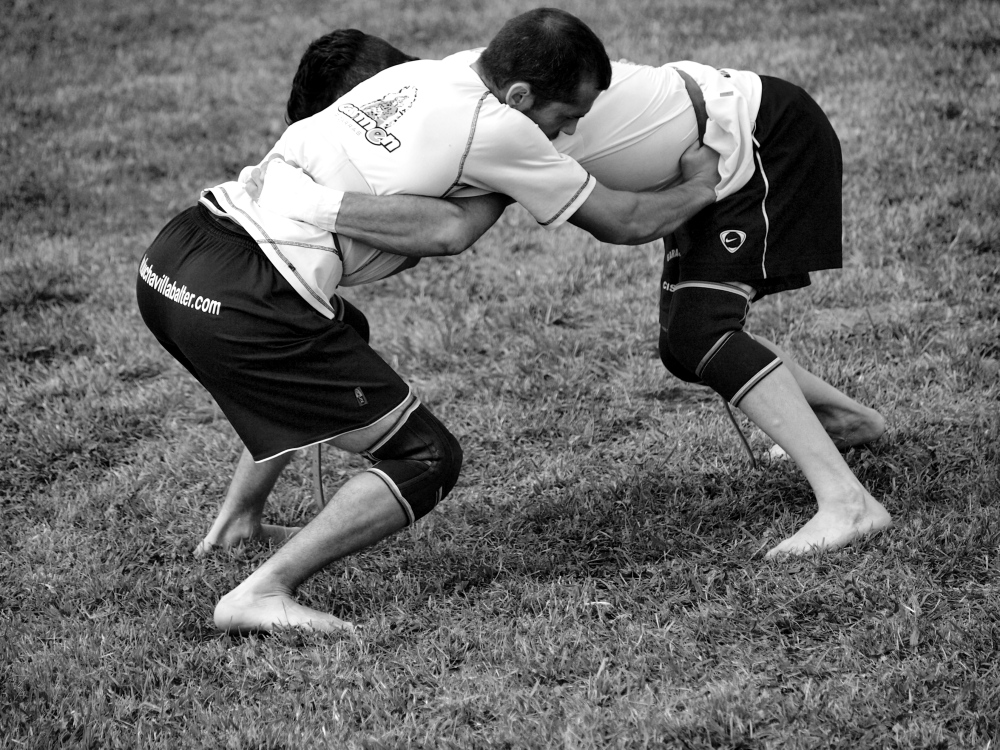

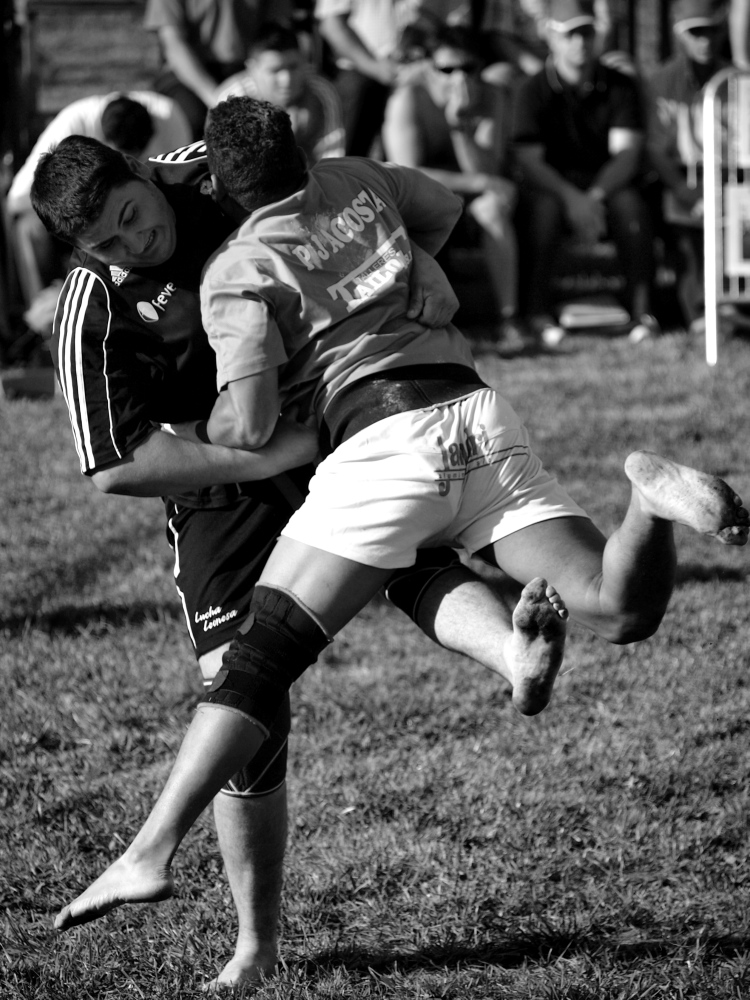

Leonese wrestling (Leonese: aluche, Spanish: lucha leonesa), is a form of wrestling specific to the Province of León in Spain. It is one of the oldest sports on the European continent.

== Rules and technique ==
Leonese wrestling bouts occur in the corro, a circle of 12 to 18 metres (39 to 59 ft) diameter. The corro is traditionally a grassed area, but bouts can now occur on mats.

Contestants wrestle barefooted in short trousers and shirt. Characteristically, they wear a leather belt 2 centimetres (0.79 in) wide. This belt surrounds the waist above the hips so that it can be easily held by the opponent.

Points are scored if:

- the opponent touches the floor with any part of the back (fall; 2 points)
- the opponent touches the floor otherwise (half fall; 1 point)
- the opponent's belt is removed (fall; 2 points).

The match ends either after one contestant reaches four points, or after two minutes when it is awarded on points. In the case of a tie, the referee may rule that the contestant who has shown the most initiative has won.

The name "aluche" is possibly of Celtic origin. Leonese wrestling was spread throughout Iberia by Leonese shepherds in their seasonal migrations. The style became known by various names through the region, including Lucha de la Cruz in Salamanca; vueltas or marañas in Muga de Sayago; luchas or trinchas in Zamora; Lucha in La Moraña (Ávila); galhofa in the north of Portugal; valto in the La Lomba, León; altío or aluchas in La Cepeda; and lucha in the Palencia mountains and Saldaña.

The Comisión Provincial de Lucha (Provincial Wrestling Commission) formed in 1920, and standardised the rules of the sport in 1931–1932. The Federación de Lucha Leonesa was formed in 1932, as part of the national Federación Española de Lucha.

It remains a successful regional style.

Leonese wrestling was commemorated as part of a set of stamps on traditional sports that was released by Correos in 2008.

== Leagues ==
Two leagues exist: the winter league and the summer league. The first one is wrestled by teams (there exist currently seven teams and three municipal schools). The second one is wrestled individually and has four categories: light (up to 68 kilograms (150 lb)), average (up to 78 kilograms (172 lb)), heavy-average (up to 88 kilograms (194 lb)) and heavy (above 88 kilograms (194 lb)). Also for the boys that want to participate in this sport there is a league designated "base league" that is divided in age and weight categories.

The season ends with the traditional competition "Rivera VS Montaña" (River Bank VS Mountain) that every year is celebrated alternately in the mountains and in the river valley. These teams divide their influence area by the FEVE railway line (León-Bilbao). For this competition the scoring system changes, since it is wrestled to one fall or to 4 half falls and without time, and the winner team is the one that keeps at least a fighter in the ring (designated the rooster of the ring).
