= James Cama =

James Cama Sr.
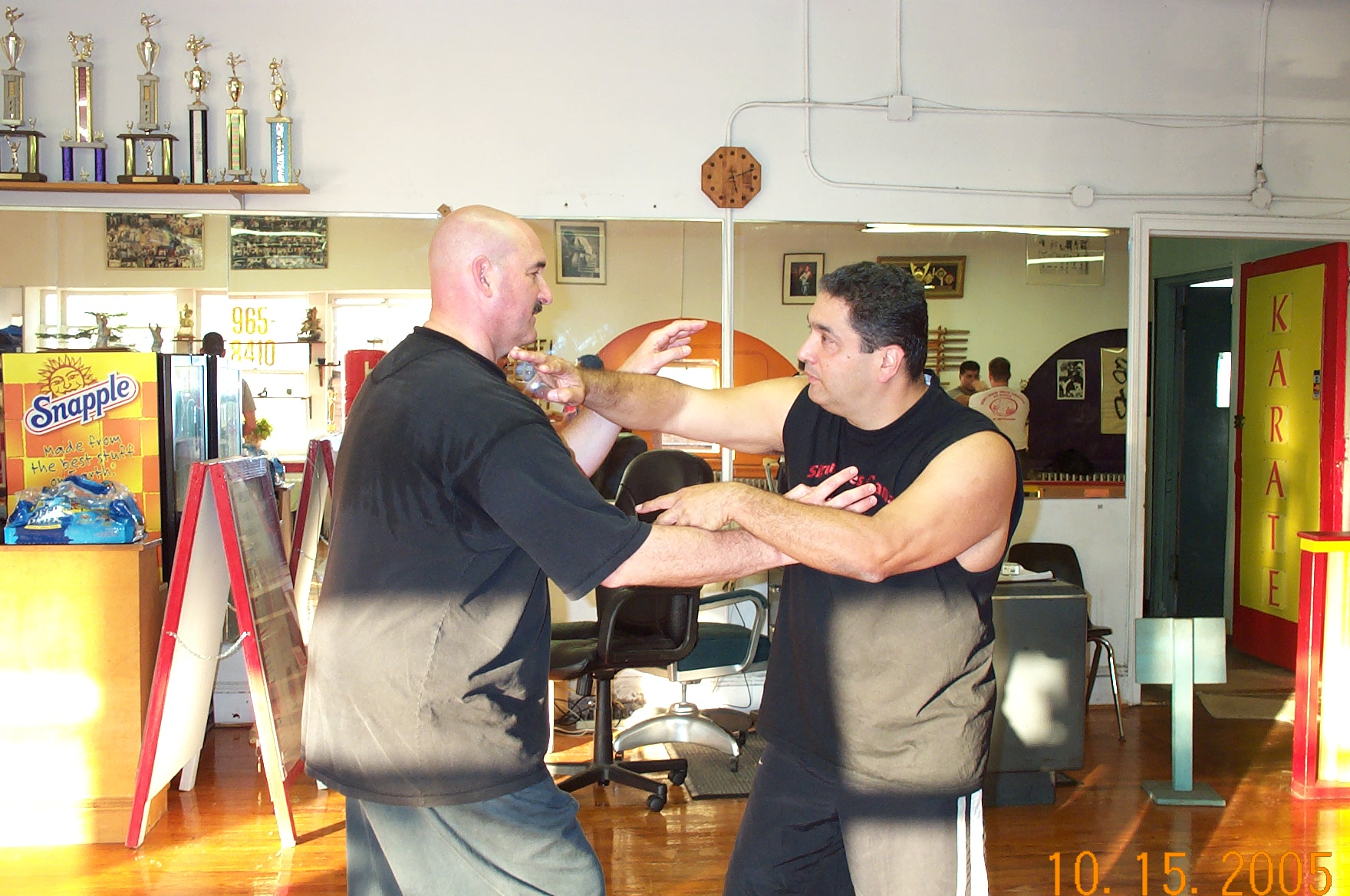
- Late sifu James Cama (on the right) with a student
- Born: December 8, 1957; New York City, United States
- Died: August 15, 2014 (aged 56); New York City, New York, United States
- Style: Wing Chun, Southern Praying Mantis
- Teachers: Peter Urban, Henry Leung, Robert Lee (martial artist)
- Years active: 1975 – 2014

Other information
- Occupation: Martial Arts Teacher
- Website: https://buddhahand-wingchun.com/

James Cama Sr. (December 8, 1957 – August 15, 2014) was an American martial arts practitioner and teacher.

== Career ==
Beginning his martial arts training as a young child, Cama soon became a notable student of Peter Urban and opened his own first dojo at the age of 18. He eventually reached the rank of 8th Dan in Urban's American Goju system. While still teaching karate and studying under Urban, Cama experimented and studied for shorter periods of time a variety of styles, including Eagle Claw and Hung Gar.

James eventually ended up becoming a disciple of Henry Leung, of the Buddha Hand Wing Chun system. Sifu Leung was the only recognized grand-master of the Fut Sao Wing Chun system in the West. After many years or practice and following Leung's death in 2011, Cama became the sole inheritor of this unique system outside of China. Over the years, this system became Cama's main style of practice and teaching, and he had been instructing it many years before Leung's death, with his blessing. Being the sole inheritor of the Fut Sao Wing Chun system through direct lineage teachings made James Cama a unique individual in Chinese Martial Arts circles.

Later in life while in his 30s, Cama became interested in pursuing the study of Southern Praying Mantis. After visiting a number of teachers from various lineages, chance led him to become a disciple of Robert Lee. The latter is a disciple of the late Lam Sang, who had brought the Kwong Sai Jook Lum Southern Mantis system to the United States. After many years of intensive training, Cama became the head instructor at the Hung Ching (Chinese Masons) club in New York, where Lam Sang once taught. James maintained this respectable position until his death in 2014.

Cama died on August 15, 2014, and is survived by his wife and two children.

Cama wrote a single book, covering the Buddha Hand Wing Chun system, which was published on August 14, 2014.
