= Okinawa Seidokan =

Style of karate

Shian Toma
- Born: November 23, 1929; Okinawa, Japan
- Died: May 30, 2013 (aged 83); Okinawa, Japan
- Style: Shorin-Ryu, Goju-Ryu, Motobu-Ryu, Kenpō, Okinawan kobudō
- Teachers: Shinzato Sokishi, Seiki Toma, Zenryo Shimabukuro, Nakamura Shigeru, Seikichi Uehara
- Rank: 10th degree red belt in Okinawan Karate and Kobudo

Okinawa Seidokan is a style of Okinawa classical karate (Tode) and Kobudo founded in 1984 by Shian Toma. It is a synthesis of the Shorin Ryu katas, Motobu Ryu two-person open hand grappling and weapons techniques, and Kobudo katas mostly of the Ryukyu Kobudo lineages.

== History ==
Shian Toma opened his dojo in 1960 teaching Shorin Ryu and Kobudo to the local populace and the US Servicemen. Originally Shian Toma named his dojo Toma Dojo, but later the name was changed to Sei-Do-Kan Dojo. This translates to "True Way House/Style" or "A House of the True Way".

In the early 1960s, Shian Toma's teachings were referred to as a style called Shorinji Ryu, and his dojo belonged to the Okinawa Kenpo Renmei under Shigeru Nakamura. In 1968 Shian Toma, Seikichi Uehara and Seiyu Oyata formed the Ryukyu Karate-do Renmei. Then in 1969 the dojo became an official member of the Motobu Undun Di society and the style came to be referred to as Seidokan Motobu Ryu, Toma was promoted by the 13th Soke of Motobu-Ryu, Seikichi Uehara, to 9th Dan Hanshi.

Toma was the first person to introduce Motobu-Ryu outside of Okinawa, teaching in North America. The first student of Master Toma to bring Seidokan to the United States was John E. Kennedy who was promoted to 9th Dan by Grand Master Toma in 2001. He is the senior student of Grand Master Toma and continues to teach the true Seidokan in Spencerport, NY. His senior student is John LaMarca, 8th Dan and Chief of Instruction for Toma Karate Dojos in Spencerport and Arizona. After a separation from the Motobu Society in 1983, Shian Toma formed his own organization called the Zen Okinawa Seidokan Karate Kobudo.

A need to develop and organize Okinawa Seidokan's international efforts gave birth to the Ryukoku Seidokan Karate Kobudo Renmei (RSKKR) in 2008. This international headquarters is located at the Nix Seidokan Dojo in Okinawa City. Ron Nix is the International Ambassador and President of the RSKKR.

Due to the death of the headmaster Shian Toma in May 2013, Shigemitsu Tamae of Yomitan, Okinawa became the second headmaster of Okinawa Seidokan. The surviving Toma family officially retired the original organization "Zen Okinawa Seidokan Karate Kobudo Renmei" name. The first word "Zen" was then dropped out of respect to the Toma Family wishes and Shigemitsu Tamae formed the Okinawa Seidokan Karate Kobudo Renmei (OSKKR) as the head dojo. Shigemitsu Tamae and Ron Nix travel out of Okinawa to teach seminars, and host visiting karate practitioners from all over the world.

In 2016 C. Michial Jones, who was graded to Shihan by Shian Toma and to Kyoshi by Col. Roy J. Hobbs in Seidokan Karate and Kobudo, founded the International Karate Kobudo Kyokai to further the teachings of Shian Toma.

== Major associations ==
- Okinawa Seidokan Karate Kobudo Renmei - Shigemitsu Tamae (Toma's Successor)
- Ryukoku Seidokan Karate Kobudo Renmei - Ron Nix (promoted to 9th Dan by Toma)
- Kenshinkan Sogo Budo Kenkyukai - Roy J. Hobbs (promoted to 9th Dan Hanshi by Toma) with dojo in 26 countries
- International Seidokan Motobu-Ryu Rengokai - Jody Paul
- Seidokan International - Allen Tackett (9th Dan by Toma)
- International Seidokan - Glenn Capistrant (promoted to 9th Dan by Toma)
- Sakura Take Kan International - Mimoun Boulahfa (promoted to 8th Dan by Toma)
- International Karate Kobudo Association - C. Michial Jones
