= Genseiryū =

Style of karate

Genseiryū (玄制流) is a style of Karate founded by Seiken Shukumine (1925-2001). With Genseiryū, Shukumine combined classic Shuri-te techniques with his own innovations thus developing the special characteristics unique to the style. However, Shukumine would eventually come to realize the shortcomings of this system, but still use it as the foundation of his much more well-known style Taido.

== Etymology ==
The name Genseiryū was first used in 1953. In Japanese the name consists of three different characters (kanji):玄制流.

The first is gen (玄) and means 'mysterious', 'occult', and 'universe' but also 'a subtle and deep truth'. The second is sei (制) and translates to 'control', 'system', 'law' or 'rule' but also 'creating a form.' The last is ryū (流, ryū) which simply means 'style' or 'school.' The combination of gensei (玄制) could be translated as 'to control the universe', but is interpreted by members of the school to mean something like "to pursue the deep truth and making it clear through the form," which can be regarded physically as well as spiritually.

== History ==
Genseiryū has its roots in an old karate style called Shuri-te. Some sources speak of Tomari-te being the source, but the differences were minimal since both styles contributed to the development of Shōrin-ryū. In the 1920s and '30s there were three major karate styles in Okinawa. They were all named after the cities where they were developed: Naha, Tomari and Shuri. These three styles (Naha-Te, Tomari-Te and Shuri-Te) are sometimes called more generally Okinawan Karate.

Matsumura "Bushi" Sōkon (1809–1898) was one of the masters of Shuri-te. His many students who later became legends of karate included Yasutsune (Ankō) Itosu. A lesser known disciple was Bushi Takemura. He developed a version of the kata (型) Kushanku that is still trained in Genseiryū and Bugeikan today. One of Takemura's disciples was Kishimoto (1862–1945, some sources speak of 1868 as birth year). He became the later teacher of Seiken Shukumine.

Seiken Shukumine, born 9 December 1925 in Nago on the Japanese island of Okinawa, started at age 8 with karate lessons from Ankō Sadoyama, a grandmaster in koryū karate ("Old style/school Chinese techniques"). He trained him for four years. When Shukumine was about 14 years old, he was accepted by Kishimoto. Kishimoto was very selective: he had only nine kōhai (=disciples) throughout his life and also Seiken Shukumine had to insist many times, before Kishimoto decided to teach the young man. The last two students of Kishimoto actually were Seiken Shukumine and Seitoku Higa (born 1920). Another source states that Seiken Shukumine was tested before Kishimoto accepted him as a student. When Shukumine and Kishimoto met for the first time, Kishimoto took a poker and threw a piece of wooden coal with full force towards Shukumine, who evaded. Kishimoto accepted him as a student on one condition: to promise him to keep the techniques a secret.

During the Second World War the 18-year-old Shukumine was drafted into the navy and had to join the Japanese Kamikaze Corps where he became a "kaiten" pilot, a one-man ship packed with explosives used in kamikaze suicide attacks against American warships. Seiken Shukumine was trained to guide this small craft through the protective maze of steel netting that was laid down in the water around the ships, to prevent them from being attacked by these kaiten. He thought in a martial art way to manoeuvre between these steel nettings and tried to think of techniques to avoid enemy torpedoes. He learned that he had to work hard to penetrate the enemy's defenses, and the imagination of the martial artist in him saw how such an approach could be adapted to traditional karate to make for a more supple and dynamic form of combat.

Fortunately Shukumine was never appointed for a suicide attack and he survived the war. But when he came back home he found Okinawa demolished by the bombings and his master Soko Kishomoto was killed during the Battle of Okinawa in 1945. Shukumine retreated in solitude for a couple of years and started to develop his karate style with his training as a kaiten pilot in the back of his head. He combined his new techniques with the classic techniques he had learned from his masters Sadoyama and Kishimoto, thus developing the special characteristics of Genseiryū.

In 1949 in the town of Itō (Shizuoka Prefecture, Japan), Seiken Shukumine demonstrated publicly his karate techniques for the first time. In October 1950 Seiken Shukumine participated in a karate exhibition arranged by Nippon Television. In this demonstration also participated other masters like Hidetaka Nishiyama (of the Japan Karate Association, JKA), Yasuhiro Konishi (Ryobukai) Ryusho Sakagami (Itosukai), H. Kenjo (Kenshukai), Kanki Izumikawa and Shikan (Seiichi) Akamine (both of Gōjū-ryū). Shukumine demonstrated a.o. the kata Koshokun dai, Tameshiwari (breaking technique, in this case Shukumine broke 34 roof tiles with shutō, the edge of the open hand) and Hachidan-tobi-geri (jumping kick with 8 kicks in one jump). In the early 1950s Shukumine created Sansai no kata, a masterpiece of Genseiryū karate.

In 1953 Shukumine started to give lessons on the Tachikawa military base to the Self-Defense Forces and for the next 10 years he gave lessons at many dojos (e.g. at universities and corporate groups) around the Tokyo area. It was in 1953 that Shukumine officially announced his techniques were Genseiryū, but the year 1950 is often mentioned as the year of the beginning of Genseiryū.

In 1964 Shukumine published his book Shin Karatedō Kyōhan in which he describes the basics of Ko-ryu Karate-do. Some of the kata in the book are explained thoroughly, with pictures.

- Ten-i no Kata
- Chi-i no Kata
- Jin-i no Kata
- Sansai
- Koryū Naifanchi
- Koryū Bassai
- Koryū Kusanku

There are many more kata mentioned in this book, without pictures, a total of about 44 kata, including Taikyoku-Shodan, Tensho-no-Kata, Wankan, etc. In the book he mentions the name Genseiryū a few times. He refer to the contents of the book as being koryū (古流), which is considered as 'old tradition' or 'old school' karate. In the book he added some kata that he created himself: Ten-i no Kata Chi-i no Kata Jin-i no Kata and Sansai. In the book Shin Karatedō Kyōhan many kata and techniques and training materials are described.

From the 1960s Genseiryū started to spread also outside Japan, to countries like the USA, Spain, Finland, Holland, Denmark, Australia, Brazil, India, etc.

In 1965 Shukumine introduced a new martial art. This martial art is a further development of Genseiryū which he named Taidō. Taidō is not to be regarded as karate, but as a new martial art. From that point on, Shukumine was mainly involved with Taidō and many of his pupils started to train in Taidō as well. However, some students of Taidō kept a friendly relationship with some students of Genseiryū and Shukumine was still occasionally involved with his former students, as he wished for them to join him in Taido.

In the mid 1970s, Shukumine wrote another book which is much lesser known in the karate world than his first one. The title of this book is (translated into English) "The Karate training by complete drawing" and has about 200 pages where he describes karate techniques but also the differences between karate and judo, karate and aikido, karate and Taidō, etc.

On 26 November 2001 Seiken Shukumine died of cardiac arrest, after a long sickness (since 1995). He was 75 years old and left a wife, a son and two daughters behind.

== Characteristics of Genseiryū ==
Shukumine was also known as a philosopher and during the war he learned that to do something unanticipated or unexpected is the secret to victory, whether in a war between two nations or in a mere personal conflict. In other words: the basic philosophy of Genseiryū pursues this idea of doing the unexpected.

Shukumine ruminated on how to apply this idea not only to life but also to Genseiryū Karate and its kata. Eventually he created the basic theory of "Sen, Un, Hen, Nen and Ten." These are the basic principles that make Genseiryū a three-dimensional karate style:

- Sen (whirlwind): vertical circular movement of the body axis (rotating, turning);
- Un (waves): elegant up and down movement in the directions of front and back;
- Hen (clouds): falling movement in front and back, right and left by your own will;
- Nen (maelstrom, whirlpool): twisted hand and arm techniques, mainly executed on the spot;
- Ten (luminous): a technique in an unexpected situation created by front turn, back turn and side turn.

It is "Sansai" that is known widely as a typical kata of Genseiryū with many of these techniques. Other genuine techniques of Genseiryū are the kicks Ebi-geri (back kick with both hands on the ground and the face close to the ground) and Manji-geri (side kick (mawashi-geri) with head close to the ground and both hands on the ground). Both kicks belong to the so-called Shajo-geri group (leaning body) and are also trained in Taidō. Besides kata, Genseiryū also practices Shihō and Happō (some other styles do too, but not all of them). Shihō (四方) translates into 'four directions' and comprises exercises in which a combination of techniques is repeated several times in four different directions (front, back, right and left). This is almost the same with Happō, but it translates into 'eight directions', thus it comprises exercises in eight different directions.

== Post-1965 ==
Throughout the years, a few students of Seiken Shukumine rejected Taido and thus continued Genseiryū even though Shukumine stopped teaching Genseiryū in 1965. Although Seiken Shukumine left Genseiryū in 1965, his students have kept on his teaching. Butokukai, which was established three years prior to Seiken Shukumine's exit from the Karate world, was continued by Kunihiko Tosa. The oldest organization of Genseiryū still existing today is that of the Genseiryū Karate-do International Federation (1959).

== See also ==
- Genseiryū Karate-do International Federation (GKIF).
- World Genseiryū Karate-dō Federation (WGKF).
