= Don Greenwell =

English footballer

Personal information
- Full name: Donald Greenwell
- Date of birth: 4 January 1924
- Place of birth: Chester-le-Street, County Durham, England
- Date of death: December 2002 (aged 78)
- Place of death: Sunderland, Tyne and Wear, England
- Position: Half-back

Senior career*
Years	Team	Apps	(Gls)
1946–1947	York City	1	(0)
Total		1	(0)
- * Club domestic league appearances and goals

Donald Greenwell (4 January 1924 – December 2002) was an English professional footballer who played as a half-back in the Football League for York City.
