= Muga de Sayago =

Place in Castile and León, Spain

Coordinates: 41°23′N 6°12′W

Muga de Sayago, Spain
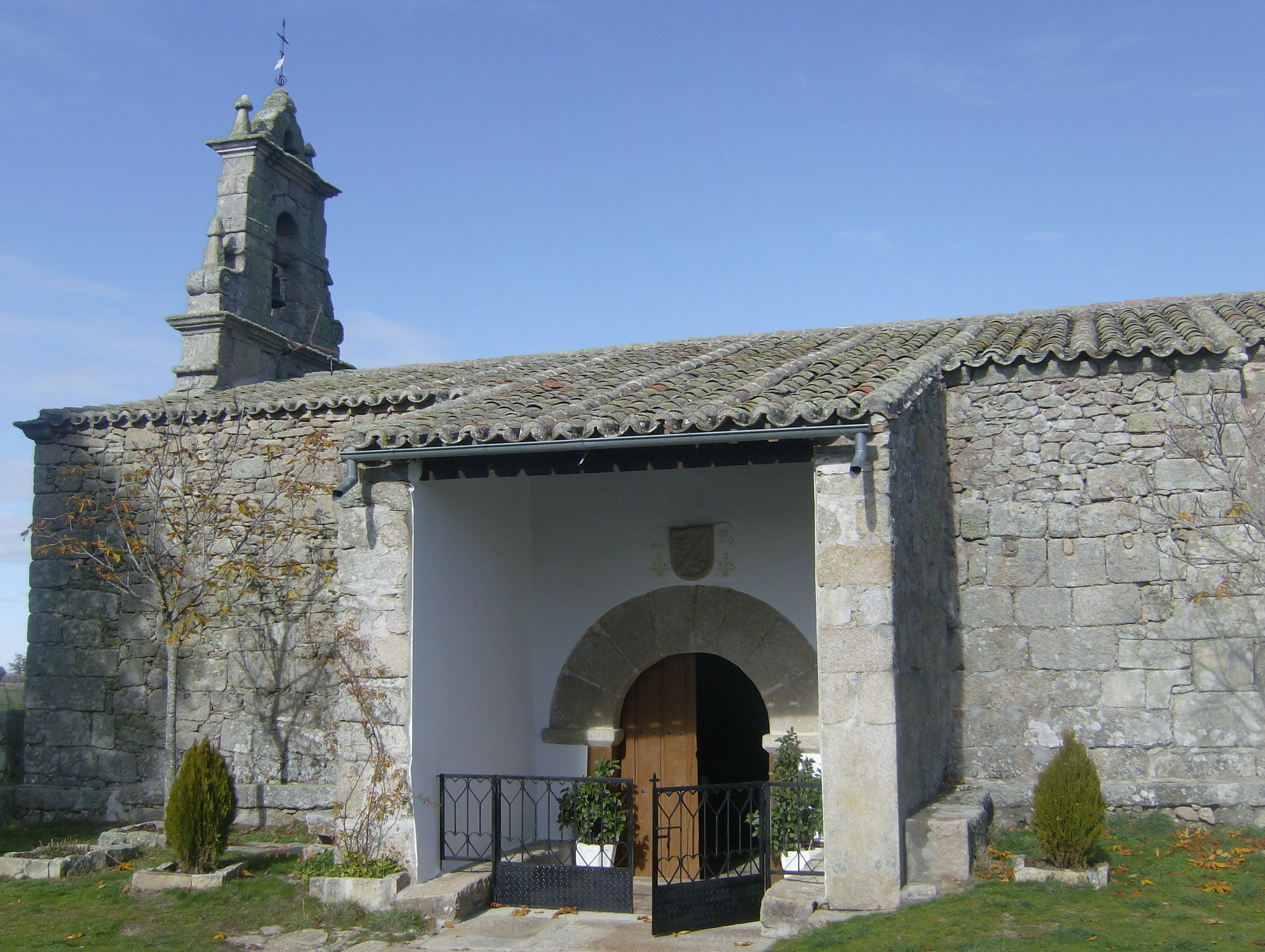
- Hermitage of Fernandiel

- Flag Coat of arms
- Interactive map of Muga de Sayago, Spain
- Country: Spain
- Autonomous community: Castile and León
- Province: Zamora
- Municipality: Muga de Sayago

Area
  - Total: 36.42 km^{2} (14.06 sq mi)
- Elevation: 773 m (2,536 ft)

Population (2025-01-01)
  - Total: 313
  - Density: 8.59/km^{2} (22.3/sq mi)
- Time zone: UTC+1 (CET)
  - Summer (DST): UTC+2 (CEST)

Muga de Sayago is a municipality located in the province of Zamora, Castile and León, Spain. According to the 2004 census (INE), the municipality had a population of 472 inhabitants.
