= Mianquan =

Martial arts in Hebei province of northern China

- Also known as: Cotton Boxing, Soft Boxing
- Focus: Striking
- Hardness: Soft attacks gradually and stealthily become hard attacks
- Country of origin: China
- Creator: Mong Gwa Yu
- Famous practitioners: Lan Suzhen
- Descendant arts: Yang Mian System
- Olympic sport: No

Mianquan (Chinese: 綿拳; Wade–Giles: mien ch'uan; lit. 'continuous boxing') is a northern Chinese martial arts style which most likely originated in the province of Hebei. There is no definite given record of the creator or origin of the style.

The theory for this style is that defense becomes offense and softness turns to hardness, and the practitioner's attacks always follow after the opponent's. Soft attacks gain the upper hand for a practitioner and sets up the opponent for a harder, more dominant array of movements. It was one of the wushu styles demonstrated at the 1936 Summer Olympics in Berlin, Germany. Lan Suzhen performed a modified version of the art at the 1953 Tianjin Sports festival and it was generally well received.

The style is simple to use as it does not require advanced movements such as grappling, therefore only using punches and kicks. Mianquan requires balanced posture, with the majority of the body relaxed and a short-range attack span.
