= Chow Gar =

Chinese martial arts discipline

Tung Kong Chow Gar Tong Long 東江周家螳螂
- Also known as: Chow Gar
- Focus: Striking
- Country of origin: China
- Creator: Chow Ah Naam
- Famous practitioners: Lau Soei (劉水), Yip Shui (葉瑞)
- Parenthood: Southern Shaolin Kung Fu, Shanxi kung fu
- Olympic sport: No

Tung Kong Chow Gar Tong Long (Chinese: 東江周家螳螂; pinyin: dōngjiāng zhōujiā tángláng; lit. 'Dong River Chow Family Praying Mantis'), or simply Chow Gar (周家), is a southern Chinese martial art (kung fu) of the Hakka (客家) people. It is one of the four major schools of Southern Praying Mantis, the other schools being Chu Gar (朱家; 'Chu Family'), Kwong Sai Jook Lum (江西竹林; 'Jiangxi Bamboo Forest'), and Tit Ngau (鐵牛; 'Iron Ox'). It is an aggressive style of kung fu with an emphasis on close-range fighting. These skills are developed by utilizing a range of training techniques that have been developed over several centuries.

This style is unrelated to Jow-Ga kung fu (周家), a southern Chinese martial art founded by Jow Lung in the early 1900s. It is also unrelated to the Northern Praying Mantis systems such as Seven Star Praying Mantis (七星螳螂拳), Plum Blossom Praying Mantis (梅花螳螂拳), and Tai Chi Praying Mantis (太極螳螂拳).

== Introduction ==
=== History ===
The history of Chow Gar was transmitted orally with little supporting documentation until the 1900s. The origins of the system are similar to other martial arts of the Hakka community with references to the Southern Shaolin Monastery and exploits centered around southern China. Information before the turn of the 20th century is speculative at best. In the modern era, Lau Soei is recognized by both Chow Gar and Chu Gar practitioners as the leading promoter of this style. The leading authorities on Chow Gar are the students of Yip Shui, and their schools can be found worldwide.

=== Lineage of past masters ===
- Chow Ah Naam (周亞南) is the traditional founder of Chow Gar in the 19th century. He is said to have spent many years in the Southern Shaolin Monastery under the guidance of the abbot Sim See Yan. He later developed a new style which he called Praying Mantis after watching a fight between a praying mantis and a bird. His style is not related to the Northern Praying Mantis style created by Wang Lang (王朗) during the Song dynasty (960–1279). Chow taught the style to many people in the region, including his student Wong Fook Go.
- Wong Fook Go (黃福高) was initially a layperson but later became a traveling monk. He traveled throughout southern China including Waiyeung (Huiyang) village in the area of Tungkong (Dong Jiang).
- Lau Soei (劉水; 1866–1942) was an accomplished teacher of martial arts in his home village of Waiyeung in Guangdong Province, before meeting Wong. Oral traditions suggest that Lau challenged Wong but was soundly defeated by him. Lau then became a student of Wong and became proficient in Chow Gar. Using this knowledge, he further enhanced his reputation and earned the nickname "Number one of the three Dongjiang tigers" (東江三虎之一). In 1913, Lau moved to Hong Kong and established a Southern Praying Mantis school in Kowloon. Initially, he would teach his system only to members of the Hakka community. Near the end of his career, he opened up his teachings to the general public.
- Yip Shui (葉瑞; 啟瑞; 1912–2004), who was one of Lau's first non-Hakka students, perpetuated his tradition after training extensively with his predecessor. He established a reputation for the effectiveness of the Chow Gar style by meeting all challenges.

=== Masters in Hong Kong ===
After the passing of Grandmaster Yip Shui in 2004, the legacy of Chow Gar continues to be taught and passed down to future generations. Listed below are some of the masters who are currently teaching the system in Hong Kong:

- Yip Chee Keung (葉志強), the son of Yip Shui, continues the family tradition as the inheritor, gatekeeper, and Grandmaster of the system. Chee Keung emigrated to London, England in the 1970s, where he established a Chow Gar school. Chee Keung currently resides in Hong Kong but regularly travels abroad to teach in Hungary and the UK.
- Ng Si Kay (吳士麒), Yip Shui's son-in-law, is the current head instructor for the Chow Gar Mantis Association (International) based in Hong Kong.
- Li Tin Loi (李天來), a student of Yip Shui, teaches at the Hong Kong Tung Kong Chow Gar Praying Mantis Li Tin Loi Martial Arts Association (香港東江周家螳螂李天來拳術會). In recent years, master Li has joined with other masters of Hakka kung fu to form the Hakka Kung Fu and Culture Research Society, with the goal of preserving and promoting the traditions of Hakka martial arts and culture such as the Unicorn Qilin dance.
- Ng Woon Hang (吳煥亨), a student of Yip Shui, teaches at the Chow Gar Praying Mantis Kung Fu Association (周家螳螂國技會) in Mong Kok.
- Ng Ying Choi (伍英才), a student of Yip Shui, has taught privately at the Longevity Pavillion (養身軒) in Causeway Bay

=== Masters around the world ===
In the UK, Paul Whitrod started training in Chow Gar at the age of 15 at Yip Chee Keung's school in 1975. Whitrod later visited and trained in Hong Kong where he stayed at Grandmaster Yip Shui's home and became a closed-door student (入室弟子), learning the finer details of the system and traditional dit da medicine. In the fall of 1986, Whitrod opened his first full-time school in London, and the following year invited his Sigung Yip Shui and Sifu Yip Chee Keung to London, where they made Paul Whitrod the UK representative of Chow Gar. At the request of Yip Shui, Paul Whitrod also established the International Chow Gar Praying Mantis Association in 1986. Whitrod continues to teach at his school in Stratford, London, and has taught many students over the years, many of whom have gone on to spread the art in other countries, including Italy, Switzerland, Germany, Ireland, Greece, and the US.

Australian Chow Gar Sifu Paul Brennan, an original student of Yip Chee Keung and his father Yip Shui, then became a closed-door student of Master Ng Si Kay and as of 2023 offers classes at several locations in Queensland, Australia.

Chow Gar's Hungary branch has a following with many students. The school is led by Sifu Bálint Vitárius, who started his martial arts studies in 1996. He has been learning directly from Yip Chee Keung since 2005.

In the United States, one of Yip Shui's first-generation students, Ngai Piu Tan, went to New York City in the late 1950s to 1960 in search of opportunity. He started to teach Praying Mantis, and by chance one of his kung fu brothers from Hong Kong also arrived in NYC and had a location for him to teach in Manhattan's Chinatown, where the exclusive club remains to this day. Over time other students of Yip Shui made their way to NYC. In the 1970s, Lee Kwun, Yip Shui's brother-in-law and one of his earliest students, emigrated to the city and took over the Chow Gar Praying Mantis club until his passing in May 2023. The club remains active to this day and is the first and oldest club in the country.

== Forms ==
There are many different forms in the Chow Gar system and each instructor may teach a variety of them. In addition to the solo forms, there are also numerous pair forms for empty hands and weapons, and many two-person drills (樁; zhuāng) to train technique, sensitivity, and power.

The names for some of the solo forms found in the system include:

=== Core fist forms ===
Chow Gar has a core set of basic forms that all instructors from different schools and lineages teach. The first three forms are known as the seed forms (拳種, lit. 'boxing') of the system and are usually the first three forms taught to beginner students to familiarize them with the correct mantis structure and shape. The last two forms in the list are also commonly taught by every school:

- Sarm Bo Jin (三步箭; 'three-step arrow')
- Sarm Jin Yiu Kiu (三箭搖橋; 'three arrows shaking bridge')
- Sarm Jin Pai Kiu (三箭批橋; 'three arrows shaving bridge')
- Sarm Gong Pin Kiu or Sarm Gong Bik Kiu (三弓片橋/三弓迫橋; 'three bows slicing or pressing bridge')
- Fut Sau, (佛手; 'Buddha's hand')

=== Intermediate forms ===
Chow Gar has a modular syllabus; the names and order of the forms may vary depending on the instructor. Some of the intermediate-level forms (中級) have relatively short sequences and can be trained in combination with other sections. Some of the intermediate forms are:

- Yum Yeung Sau (陰陽手; 'yin yang hands'), Yum Yeung Tow Jeung (陰陽吐掌; 'yin yang spitting palms'), or Yum Yeung Kam Sau (陰陽冚手; 'yin yang covering hand')
- Sup Jee Kau Da Sau (十字扣打手; 'ten-stroke striking hands')
- Law Suen Sau (Chinese: 螺旋手; lit. 'spiral hands')
- Banging on the drum
- Tow Mow Sau (吐霧手; 'spitting mist hands')
- Seong Tow Sau (雙吐手; 'double spitting hands')
- Pao Tow Quan (拋吐拳; 'throwing punches')
- Leep Kiu (獵橋; 'hunting the bridge')
- Gau Si Mun Sau
- Mo Ying Sau (無影手; 'shadowless hands')
- Chor Kui (挫橋; 'breaking the bridge')
- Say Ban Gen Tan (四板驚彈; 'four-direction shock power')
- Gen Tan Geng Sau (驚彈勁手; 'shock power hand')

=== Advanced forms ===
- Second and third level Sarm Bo Jin (二, 三級三步箭)
- Poon Loong Keok (蟠龍腳; 'coiling dragon leg')
- Sup Baat Yau Loong Sau (十八游龍手; '18 swimming dragon hands')
- Bic Saan Quan (迫山拳; 'pressing the mountain fist')
- Chin Si Sau (纏絲手; 'silk-wrapped hands')
- Dai Siu Lin Wan Sau (大小連環手; 'large and small circular handshake')
- Bo Sim Sau (捕蟬手; 'cicada-catching hand')
- Say Mun Sau (四門手; 'four-gate hand')
- Hall of light steps

=== Qigong sets ===
There are many internal energy (Chinese: 氣功; pinyin: qigong; Jyutping: hei3 gung1) exercises found in the system, which can be broadly put into three categories: exercises for maintaining health (養生功; joeng5sang1 gung1), exercises for protecting the body from physical attacks (護體功; wu6 tai2 gung1), and exercises for developing the body and power for fighting (博擊功; bok3 gik1 gung1).

Some of the key sets are:

- Sup Baat Um Geng Sau (十八暗勁手; '18 hidden power hands')
- Hap Jeung Gong (合掌功; 'clamping palm power')
- Hoot Sar Jeung (血沙掌; 'blood [and] sand palm')
- But Saan Gong (拔山功; 'lifting the mountain power')

=== Weapons ===
The main weapon in Chow Gar is a long pole, the dan tou gun (單頭棍; 'single-headed staff'). This type of polearm is typically around 7 feet 2 inches (2.18 m) and is tapered.

The long pole forms include:

- Ng Hang Gwun (五行棍; 'five element pole')
- Dook Sair Gwun (毒蛇棍; 'poison snake pole')
- Bo Sim Gwun (捕蟬棍; 'cicada-catching pole')
- Lau Seoi Gwun (劉水棍; 'Lau Soei's pole [form]')
- Wong Ngau Chin Joi Gwun (黃牛鑽咀棍; 'yellow cattle drill bit pole')

Other weapons include:

- Tse Mo Sheung Do (子母雙刀; 'mother and son double knives')
- Tit Chek (鐵尺; 'iron ruler')
- Joi Fung Gim (追風劍; 'wind-chasing sword')
- Dan Do (單刀; 'broadsword')
- Dai Paa (大耙; 'trident' or 'big rake')
- Hakka Til or Sheung Tau Gwun (客家挑 or 雙頭棍; 'Hakka pick' or 'double-headed staff')
- Tit Jim (鐵針; 'metal needle')
- Walking stick
- Umbrella (傘)

Weapons pair work includes:

- Pole vs pole
- Pole vs tit chek
- Empty hand vs butterfly knives
- Spear vs broadsword and shield

== Techniques ==
=== Basic movements ===
In 1965, Grandmaster Yip Shui published the book Mantis Boxing Basic Techniques (螳螂拳散手; Tong Long Quan San Sau), wherein he described the history of the style along with explanations and instructions for some of the most common basic techniques (散手; San Sau) and fundamental training methods found within the system.

There are at least 36 basic movements consisting of one or three moves, including:

1. Bow Chong (包椿; 'wrap up punch')
2. Gau Choi (絞槌; 'twisting punch')
3. Yui Sau (搖手; 'shake off hand')
4. Chuen Sau (傳手; 'passing hand')
5. Cye Sau (拪手; 'deflecting hand')
6. Narp Sau (押手; 'pressing hand')
7. Saw Sau (鎖手; 'lock hand')
8. Man Dan Sau (掹單手; 'single hand throw')
9. Doa Sau (抖手; 'trembling hand')
10. Kum La Sau or Kum Na Ja Jook (擒拿手 or 擒拿揸捉; 'grappling hand' or 'capture')
11. Kum Jin Sau (擒箭手; 'seizing arrow hand')
12. Ying Kum Sau (鷹擒手; 'eagle seizing hand')
13. Got Sau (割手; 'backhand cut')
14. Kok Choi (角槌; 'angled punch')
15. Suet Sau (雪手; 'sweeping hand') or Mut Sau
16. Yong Sau (lit. 'upward reaching hand')
17. Pai Sau (批手; 'slicing hand')
18. Chum Chung Sau (沉掙手; 'sinking elbow hand')
19. Lim Chung Sau (拈掙手; 'picking elbow hand')
20. Dun Chung (墩掙; 'backward elbow')
21. Tai Sau (帶手; 'carrying hand')
22. Chup Sau (插手; 'straight thrusting hand')
23. Yum Yearn Kum Sau (陰陽冚手; 'yin yang covering hand')
24. Jor Yau Biu Sau (左右標手; 'left and right finger thrusting hand')
25. Din Sau (鼎手; 'ding hand'; a ding is an ancient Chinese three-legged ceremonial cauldron)
26. Jin Sau (剪手; 'scissor or shearing hand')
27. Soc Sau (索手; 'shock pulling hand')
28. Lau Sau (漏手; 'leaking hand')
29. Deng Choi (釘槌; 'nailing hook punch')
30. Cheet Jeung (切掌; 'cutting palm strike')
31. Yum Yearn Yuet Jeung (陰陽乙掌; 'yin yang second palm')
32. Pin Chung (掽掙; 'bumping elbow')

Other techniques not mentioned in the book:

- Noi Choi Fun Sau or Fun Sau (分手; 'splitting hand')
- Larp Sau (lit. 'snatch hand')
- Kwor Sau (lit. 'circle over hand')
- Pik Sau (辟手; 'opening hand')
- Jin Choi (箭槌; 'straight arrow punch')
- Siep Choi (lit. 'to slip in punch')
- Pin Kiu (片橋; 'slicing bridge')
- Chor Kiu (挫橋; 'smashing bridge')

== Training methods ==
The Chow Gar system has numerous training methods for both solo and partner training. There are a few very important exercises that every Chow Gar practitioner must practice from the beginning and continue to train constantly and consistently, even at the advanced levels. These are Sarm Bo Jin, Chy Sau, Doi Chong, and Chuen Saan Gap.

=== Sarm Bo Jin ===
Sarm Bo Jin is the first and most important form that is learnt in the system. It develops all the foundations required to progress in this system, and training in this form never stops.

=== Chy Sau ===
The Chy sau (搓手; 'grinding hands' or 'grinding arm') exercise is done with a partner and aims to develop the power of the body into the arms and the bridge. There are several variations of this exercise with emphasis on different aspects of training.

=== Pair drills ===
Doi chong (對樁; 'pair drills') are exercises that take the skills developed from Sarm Bo Jin and Chy sau, and teach how to use them on a partner and how to handle incoming attacks, both while staying balanced and with the correct structure and form.

The exercises are initially done with both arms together, Seong Chong (雙樁; 'double [arm] drill'), then progress to alternating each arm Dan Chong (單樁; 'single [arm] drill') which is done with increasing resistance, speed and intensity. Eventually, every technique within the system can be trained in this format as a pair drill.

There are many pair drills in the system that are used to help train different techniques, conditioning, sensitivity and power. They include:

- Seong Chong
- Dan Chong
- Lim Chung Chong (拈掙樁; 'elbow pick drill'), or Cye Sau Gau Choi Chong (篩手絞搥樁; 'deflecting hand hammer fist drill')
- Gau Choi Chong
- Hoi Kui Chong (開橋樁; 'opening the bridge drill')
- Sheung Toi Chong (上退樁; 'advance and retreat drill')
- Man Dan Sak Kiu (掹單殺橋; 'single hand throw kill the bridge [drill]')
- Sher Ying Shu Bo (蛇形鼠步; 'serpentine rat steps')

=== Pangolin press-up ===
Chuen Saan Gap (穿山甲; 'pangolin') is a type of press-up where the practitioner dives to the ground and then back up again. The action resembles that of a pangolin when it burrows into the ground, hence the name. As this practice advances to later stages, this can be done on the fingertips with the hands in the shape of a claw, and also one-handed. Over time, this exercise can develop tremendous strength in the fingers, elbows and arms.

== Special skills and characteristics of the style ==
All martial art styles have their own unique aspects and special skill sets that distinguish them from other styles. Chow Gar also has some unique skills which aim to give the practitioner an advantage during a physical confrontation. Some of these skills are described below:

=== Shock power ===
The short-range shock power or startled power (驚彈勁法) is a basic characteristic of this style. According to legend, this technique was created when founder Chow Ah Naam saw a praying mantis fighting off a blackbird using quick sudden movements.

In Chow Gar, there are three stages of achieving this type of power. The initial stage is referred to as cho ging or rough unrefined natural power and strength. The second stage is a type of refined and trained controllable power called um ging or hidden power. The final stage is the shock power geng tan ging.

=== Four directional power ===
This skill trains the techniques so that within each movement, the power is never only in one single direction or plane, but in multiple directions (四板勁; 'four plank power'). Essentially this skill allows defence and offence to be combined into one movement.

== Principles and theory ==
There are many poems and maxims related to Chow Gar which aim to help students understand how the system works and how they should train and practice.

=== Morality and ethics ===
- Chinese: 遵親遵師遵教訓; pinyin: Zūn qīn zūn shī zūn jiàoxùn; lit. 'Obey [one's] parents', 'obey [one's] teachers', 'obey [their] lessons'
- 學仁學義學功夫; Xué rén xué yìxué gōngfū; 'Learn benevolence', 'learn righteousness', 'learn kung fu'

=== Poems and maxims ===
Each style has its own requirements on the body structure for application, which are expressed by the body, hands and steps. The Chow Gar system has some unique characteristics regarding its body structure that are passed down in poems.

==== Characteristics of posture (莊頭) ====
- Yuan Diu Sok – 懸吊索; 'suspended sling' or 'hanging noose', referring to the arms which should be like a hanging noose that suddenly opens and contracts
- Kum Na Ja Jook; seize and catch
- Chin Jee Tau – 千字頭; 'thousand character head', referring to keeping the chin tucked into the neck, in resemblance to the 千 character
- Wa Jai Sut – 蛙仔膝; 'young frog knees'
- Sau Gei Bui – 筲箕背; 'woven basket back', referring to the shape of the upper back being curved or rounded like that of a basket to engage the posterior back muscles and not just the superficial muscles of the arms when applying the techniques
- Tit Chek Yui – 鐵尺腰; 'iron ruler waist'

==== Principles (心法) ====
- Maa Bo Ding But Ding, Baat But Baat – 馬步丁不丁, 八不八; '[one's] stance is like a T but not a T', 'like a V but not a V'
- Sau Chong Sum How Faat – 手從心口發; 'start [with] hands that come from the heart'
- Lei But Loi, Ngor But Faat – 你不來, 我不發; 'if you do not come', 'I will not advance'
- Sau Chong Sum Faat, Fat Chong Sau Chut – 手從心發, 法從手出; 'the hands come from the heart', 'the method comes from the hands'
- Sau Hoi Sun Chum – 手去身沉; '[when] the hands go out sink the body'
- Kiu Loi Kui Sheung Gor – 橋來橋上過; 'if a bridge comes cross over it'
- Mo Kiu Ji Jo Kiu – 無橋自造橋; 'if there is no bridge', 'make one'
- 兩橋不歸隨手轉; 'Do not retrieve the bridges', 'but change the hands', which refers to how the hands, upon making contact with the opponent, do not need to withdraw to attack again, but can stick to the opponent, to sense, adapt and change according to the situation

==== Body posture (身法) ====
- Dropping the shoulders and elbows is required (要求沉肩墜肘)
- Swallow the chest and arch the back (吞胸拔背)
- Do not overdo the swallowing, do not spit (吞不能死, 吐不能盡)
- Swallow if needed, but if not turn to the side (有吞則吞, 無吞則側)
- Get smart on the single and double (及雙單要醒). This refers to turning half to the side on "single" and fully square on "double" and knowing when and why to switch back and forth during a fight.

=== Five large and five small strengths ===
The Ng Dai Geng (五大勁; 'five large strengths') are:

- Yui Geng – 腰勁; waist power
- Ma Geng – 馬勁; stance or leg power
- Kiu Geng – 橋勁; bridge or arm power
- Hong Geng – 胸勁; chest or torso power
- Tau Geng – 頭勁; head power

The Ng Siu Geng (五小勁; 'five small strengths') are:

- Ngak Geng – 額勁 forehead power
- 眼勁 – Ngan Geng; eyes power
- 牙勁 – Ngar Geng; teeth power
- 喉勁 – How Geng; throat power
- 頸勁 – Gen Geng; neck power

=== Three treasures of towns and mountains (三大鎮山之寶) ===
- Nar Loong Jau – 拿龍爪; 'grasping dragon claw'
- But San Gong - 拔山功; 'Lifting the mountain power'
- Geng Tan Geng - 驚彈勁; 'Shock power'
- Dip Gwut Gong – 疊骨功; 'rib bone power'
- Chuen San Gap - 穿山甲; 'Pangolin press ups'
- Tit Jee Gong – 鐵指功; 'iron finger power'

== See also ==
- Southern Praying Mantis
