= Tom Greenwell =

American judge

Judge of the 319th Judicial District of Texas
- In office January 1, 2003 – July 15, 2013
- Succeeded by: Jack Hunter (interim)

Personal details
- Born: Thomas Frederick Greenwell; August 6, 1956 Huntington, West Virginia, U.S.
- Died: July 15, 2013 (aged 56) Corpus Christi, Texas, U.S.
- Cause of death: Suicide by firearm
- Party: Republican
- Education: George Washington University (BA); University of Texas School of Law
- Occupation: Attorney
- Greenwell was the first Republican to serve as a judge on the 319th District Court.

Thomas Frederick Greenwell (August 6, 1956 – July 15, 2013) was a judge of the Texas 319th District Court based in Corpus Christi in Nueces County, Texas. The first Republican to serve on the 319th court, Greenwell was first elected in 2002 and reelected in 2006 and 2010.

== Legal career ==
In 1981, Greenwell graduated from the University of Texas School of Law. In 1978, he received his Bachelor of Arts with concentration in political science and journalism from George Washington University in Washington, D.C. In 1981, he was appointed a staff attorney on the Texas 13th Court of Appeals. He was chief of the legal staff on that court from 1991 to 1996. From 1997 until 2002, he was in private practice. For two years Greenwell served as the presiding administrative district judge of Nueces County. He also presided over the newly established Nueces County Veterans Court, which uses a collaborative approach among the courts, probation and corrections, and law enforcement agencies. It assists with cases of substance abuse, post traumatic stress, and anger.

Greenwell ran unsuccessfully in the general election held on November 6, 2012, for the position of judge of the Texas 13th District Court of Appeals for a term that would have expired in 2018. He was defeated by the Democrat Nora Longoria, 262,235 (59.5 percent) to 178,554 (40.5 percent). He had planned to seek another term on the state district court in the Republican primary scheduled for March 4, 2014. His friend and campaign manager Al Hinojosa described Greenwell as "caring" and "very steady" and expressed surprise at his sudden death.

== Suicide and aftermath ==
Greenwell was found in his chambers dead from a self-inflicted gunshot to the head. A handwritten will was found near the body. According to Nueces County Sheriff Jim Kaelin, the judge faced financial ruin. He had exhausted spending caps on five credit cards and owed the repayment of loans. Kaelin said that Greenwell earned at least $140,000 annually but did not apparently live extravagantly. Investigators are looking into possible blackmail or extortion attempts against the judge.

A memorial service was to be held on July 25, 2013, at the First United Methodist Church in Corpus Christi.

Greenwell had a surviving brother. He left his estate to Albert Fuentes (born c. 1977), one of the persons of interest in Greenwell's death. Fuentes has in the past had scrapes with the law, and Greenwell had been trying to help him for at least six years. Fuentes moved rent-free into a house that the judge owned in Sun Valley Estates and was allowed to drive Greenwell's vehicle.

Political offices
Preceded by Unknown	Judge of the 319th Judicial District of Texas; 2003–2013	Succeeded by Jack Hunter (interim)
