= Taidō =

Karate-based Japanese martial art

Taidō 躰道
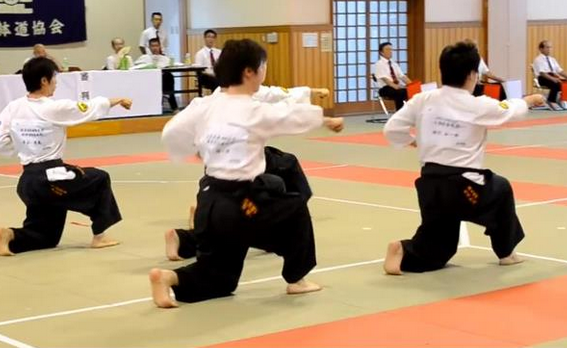
- Taidō practitioners in competition
- Focus: Striking
- Country of origin: Japan
- Creator: Seiken Shukumine
- Famous practitioners: Yutaka Ozaki, Hideo Yokoyama
- Parenthood: Okinawan martial arts (Shuri-te), Genseiryū Karate
- Official website: Japan Taido Association; World Taido Federation

Taidō (Note: 躰道, meaning "way of the body". Can be romanized as taidō, taido, taidou, taidoh.) is a Japanese martial art created in 1965 by Seiken Shukumine (1925–2001). Taidō has its roots in traditional Okinawan karate. Feeling that the martial arts, particularly karate, were not adapting to meet the needs of a changing world, Shukumine first developed a style of karate called Genseiryū around 1950.

Taidō is practiced in multiple countries, including Japan, United States, Haiti, Australia, England, France, Portugal, Sweden, Finland, the Netherlands, Denmark and Norway. The martial art is particularly popular in Finland.

== Founding ==
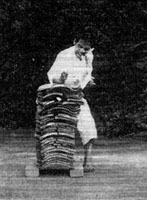
Seiken Shukumine, the founder of Taidō, sought to overcome limitations of karate by developing the more flexible Taidō.

Initially, Seiken Shukumine had founded Genseiryū Karate. But eventually, Shukumine was convinced that the limitations of karate lay in its linear mode of training. He considered how to make the defense more flexible and universal.

In 1965, Shukumine introduced a new martial art. This martial art is a further development of Genseiryū which he named Taidō. Taidō is not to be regarded as karate, but as a new martial art. Taidō's techniques offered many innovations: the inclusion of spinning and twisting movements, gymnastic maneuvers, speedy and effective footwork, and a changing body angle.

From that point on, Shukumine was mainly involved with Taidō and many of his pupils started to train in Taidō as well. However, some students of Taidō kept a friendly relationship with some students of Genseiryū and Shukumine was still occasionally involved with his former students, as he wished for them to join him in Taido.

Taidō's purpose was, and continues to be, the application of scientific methodology and traditional values to the evolution of the martial arts. According to its creator, Taidō's ultimate aim is to equip its practitioners to function at a high level in society.

In 1984, the World Taido Federation was established, globally standardizing the martial art of Taido. The first official World Championships in the sport were held in Japan in 1993.

== Five principles of Taidō ==
The five principles of Taidō are:

- Keep your mind as clear and calm as the polished surface of a mirror. This way you will see the heart of things. Having the right state of mind will help you avoid confusion.
- Be composed. Body and mind should be one. Bear yourself correctly and you need to never fear insults.
- Invigorate your spirit from the source of energy deep in your abdomen. With the right spirit you will never fear combat.
- In every action, follow the correct precepts you have been taught. By doing so you cannot act wrongly.
- Be adaptable in your techniques and maintain freedom of physical movement. The right technique will prevent you from being dominated.

== Five types of body movements ==
Taidō classifies attack and defense techniques into five categories of body movement:

- Sen (旋) - Vertical spinning movement
- Un (運) - Ascending and descending wave-like movement
- Hen (変) - Falling movement characterized by changing the body's axis
- Nen (捻) - Horizontal spinning movement
- Ten (転) - Rolling and tumbling movement

These movements are combined with punches, kicks, and other techniques. The last category, Ten, includes acrobatic movements, for instance back-flips, which makes Taidō spectacular to watch.

Taidō has a special kind of footwork, which is called unsoku, as well as non-stepping (acrobatic) locomotion, called unshin.

== Competition ==
Competitions in Taidō include Jissen (sparring), Hokei (which is similar to kata), and Tenkai, which is a made-up fight, where one "hero" defeats five opponents during the last part of a 30-second bout. In Tenkai the judges give points to the competing teams in a similar manner as is done in for instance figure skating.

=== Jissen (Sparring) ===
Taido is a semi contact sport. A taido match is won by the competitor who is either the first to score a full point (ippon), or has more points when the time ends. A good hit must have proper and legal technique, timing, target, contact and kiai (a shout accompanying the strike). The head is not a valid target. Also, hits must not knock out the other person, but simply indicate the weak point in the opponent's defence.

A kick or a punch is worthy of ippon when it is performed from proper taido movement, has control, lands on the opponent's torso and is finally followed by an immediate retraction and return to one's original position. Failing these, an imperfect hit can however merit a half point (wazari) or a quarter point (yuko).

Warnings are given for improper and bad movement, poor basic stance, wrong target area for strikes or physical damage to the opponent. Typical of a taido match is the constant movement, used for maintaining good distance to the opponent and gaining a feasible offensive position. Turning and twisting moves, acrobatics and shifts in body axes are integral parts of a taido match.

There are no weight classes in taido, because a taidoka must be able to fight against all and any kinds of opponents.

=== Hokei ===
Movements sets are an inherent part of training in martial arts, and are made up of various basic techniques. They function as a powerful form of basic training, developing both technique, strength, speed and body control. The name for taido's movement sets is hokei.

There are 10 basic hokeis in taido. All of these sets have a basic, prearranged shape and form, but a competitor may change the rhythm and breathing of the hokei as long as the essence of the hokei remains unchanged. A competitor may also receive extra points from the referees, if the difficulty of the hokei is heightened via addition of somersaults or other moves, not found in the basic version.

The movement sets do not exist only for basic techniques, however, but also for practising combinations and training fighting against imaginary foes. Thus a good form will contain, in addition to good technique, changes in rhythm and features of offence and defence, such as focusing one's eyes on the imagined enemy, movement and production of power. Hokei is an official competition in taido, all the way up to European and World Championship level.

Those who have trained taido for a longer time will also practise hokeis for special techniques and breathing. In all hokeis the result of the match will be determined by three judges, all of whom announce via a raised flag which of the participants won.

=== Dantai jissen ===
Dantai jissen, or team sparring, is fought between two teams of five competitors each. Women may have 3-person teams. Matches are played out individually, and the team that accumulates more victories wins.

In dantai jissen the rules and scoring is similar to individual jissen, so a full point (ippon), half point (wazari) and quarter point (yuko) are available, but in addition a single match can also end in a draw, hikiwake.

A kick or a punch is worthy of ippon when it is performed from proper Taido movement, has control, lands on the opponent's torso and is finally followed by an immediate retraction and return to one's original fighting position. A perfect technique should also include a shout (kiai).

Each team has a team leader. The task of this leader is to draw up the team's tactics, and based on this to choose the appropriate fighter for each round.

Team training adds variety to one's regular training. Competing together is a part of the art's appeal. The team to win more individual bouts wins the game.

=== Dantai hokei ===
Not many may consider Taido a team sport, although training together is a key part of the art's appeal. Team hokei is a movement set performed by five competitors at the same time, in as unison as possible.

The intensive training contributes a good performance. Competitors attempt to maintain their formation from the very beginning as coherently as possible. The movement set must remain within the limits of the area.

The ultimate aim of the team is a performance in perfect unison. The rhythm and breathing in the set can be altered. Also, additional points can be awarded for more difficult techniques not found in the original basic set, such as somersaults.

Grading in team hokei involves, amongst other things, the maintaining of the formation, simultaneousness of the techniques and creativity. Also important are the general impression and the harmony of the set. All of the referees will score the whole hokei, and individual performances within will not be scored separately. The team with the highest score wins. In a tie situation, the head judge's points will determine the winner.

=== Tenkai ===
Tenkai is a prearranged and choreographed, from 25 to 30 seconds long “fight”, in which five persons (wakiyaku) will attack a single central "hero" fighter (shuyaku).

In tenkai both creativity and three-dimensionality are best brought to the stage. The group will design the fight together, which only adds to the team spirit. The timing of the techniques is crucial for the entire fight, and thus merit careful design and much practice. Tenkai thus gives one the opportunity to fully employ the large technique and movement repertoire in taido and also to utilize moves rarely seen in a normal match.

The developer of taido created these team sports to supplement the single ones, since he wanted to emphasize interactivity and sociability amongst the practitioners.

The criteria for points in tenkai include i.a. moving, usage of distance and space, three-dimensionality in both offence and defence, the difficulty of the techniques and the realism and feasibility of the attacks. The central “hero’s” performance will also be graded with regards to the moves used to finish the tenkai and five attackers. Altogether five judges will be evaluating the activities of the contestants. Furthermore, the main judge will observe the central man and the performance as a whole. The central man must win all the five attackers each at a time. Should the total time either exceed or fall short of the parameters, points will be deducted.

== International spread ==
Taidō is practiced in Japan, Sweden, Finland, Portugal, Denmark, Norway, France, Germany, the United Kingdom, the Netherlands, Australia, Canada and the United States.

There are an estimated 10,000 to 15,000 Taidoka worldwide, most of them in Japan. In Europe, Finland and Sweden are the countries with the most athletes. The world association, the World Taido Federation, was founded in 1985.

=== Finland ===
Taido first arrived in Finland in Lahti in 1972. It was brought by the Japanese student Minoru Okanda, 2nd dan. He appeared at the Sugata judo exercises in Lahti, after which he asked if people there would like to start practising a new sport.

The first Taidoka were the Judoka of the Lahti Sugata, who were impressed by Okanda's powerful technique and fast movement. Taido was started to be practiced under Genseidojo, which was the Taido section of Lahti Sugata.

The Suomen Taidoliitto (Finnish Taido Association) was founded in 1981, and it operated as the umbrella organization of all Finnish art clubs until 31 December 2013. Since 2011, the Finnish Taido Association was first a member of the Finnish Karate Association, and on 31 December 2013, after the dissolution of the Finnish Taido Association, its member clubs became directly members of the Karate Association as of 1 January 2014. Since then, the former arts association has formed an arts college in the Finnish Karate Association. Taido's sports college acts as a link between all Finnish Taido clubs and as an advocate for the sport in Finland and is called fi:Suomen Taido.

=== Sweden ===
Taido came to Sweden and outside Japan via Kauko Korhonen who founded the club Taidokan in Stenungsund, which was the first in Sweden/Europe. In Sweden, Taido is organized through the Swedish Budo and Martial Arts Association.

=== United States ===
According to American Taido Association, the presence of Taido in United States is extremely limited, with merely a single dojo situated in Peachtree Corners, Georgia. However, the association is aiming to expand in the future.

Multiple university clubs, all acting as branches of the dojo in Peachtree Corners, exist in the Southeastern United States, including at the University of Georgia, Georgia Institute of Technology, and Mississippi State University. Occasional Taido seminars are taught through the Dartmouth Japan Society at Dartmouth College in New Hampshire. Fort Lauderdale, Florida once hosted a branch of the Peachtree Corners dojo, but is now defunct.

=== Elsewhere ===
In Germany, since October 2011 there is an association in Lübeck (Uni-Dojo Zanshin Lübeck).

Taido was established in Norway in 2009. Currently, Halden Taido Club is the only club in Norway.

Australia has Taido clubs in UNSW Sydney and Victoria University Melbourne.

Great Britain too is currently limited to a single dojo situated in Exeter.

== Other ==
Taidō is unrelated to Shintaido. Taidō is also unrelated to Taido 太道 (read by some as 'futoudo').

Shojo Manga Hitomi o sorasazu ni ite (Keep Your Eyes Open) is centered on the martial art of Taido.

Yutaka Ozaki studied Taido in his childhood. Novelist Hideo Yokoyama also belonged to Taido Club during his college years. Finnish MMA fighter Aleksi Toivonen studied Taido in his youth.

On November 12, 2023, Bandai Namco revealed a new character for the upcoming Tekken 8, Reina, whose fighting style is based on Taido. Bandai Namco collaborated with renowned Taido expert Tetsuji Nakano (中野 哲爾), four-time winner of the Taido World Championships, during the design and animation phase of Reina's moveset.
