= Martial arts of Zhou Tong =

Chinese styles tied to the Song dynasty figure

This is an article about martial arts styles attributed to Zhou Tong. To read his main article, go to Zhou Tong (archer).

Various martial arts have been attributed to or associated with Zhou Tong, the archery teacher of the Song dynasty general Yue Fei. This is because assorted wuxia novels and folk legends portray him as being either a Shaolin monk or a lay disciple of Shaolin. Some of these skills range from mastery of the bow, double swords and Chinese spear to that of Wudang hard qigong, Chuojiao boxing and even magical X-ray eyes. However, the oldest historical record that mentions his name only says he taught archery to Yue Fei. Nothing is ever said about him knowing or teaching a specific style of Chinese martial arts.

Zhou Tong can also be linked to these combat arts through his historical and folklore students. Practitioners of Eagle Claw, Chuojiao and Xingyi commonly include him within their lineage history because of his association with Yue Fei, the supposed progenitor of these styles. He is also linked to Northern Praying Mantis boxing through his fictional students, the Water Margin bandits Lin Chong and Yan Qing, the adopted son of Lu Junyi. One modern day folktale even represents him as a master of Drunken Eight Immortals boxing.

According to a Yangzhou Pinghua (扬州评话 – “Yangzhou storytelling”) folktale called Meeting Zhou Tong by Chance,

“Among the itinerant people of the rivers and lakes this man was of illustrious fame, a fame reverberating like thunder, an expert in both civilian and military matters. Iron Arm Zhou Tong, Old Master Zhou!” (“Iron Arm” being his martial nickname.) Another source makes the bold assumption that he was "known as the greatest of grand-masters of all times in the history of Chinese martial arts and has many disciples who scattered across the country to teach the martial arts and all the culture involved in its knowledge, such as calligraphy, painting, poetry, chess..."

== Military ==
Yang Jwing Ming, author of Analysis of Shaolin Chin Na: instructor's Manual for all Martial Styles, states Zhou Tong taught Yue Fei "a complete system involving barehand combat, weapons, military tactics, horsemenship, archery, and other related subjects." The historical Yue Fei Biography states, “家貧力學，尤好【左氏春秋】、孫吳兵法。"

"Despite his family's poverty, [Yue Fei] was studious, and particularly favored the Zuo Zhuan edition of the Spring and Autumn Annals and the strategies of Sun Tzu and Wu Qi."

A 1930s Xingyi manual, which details a Yue biography that appears to be a variation of the semi-historical Biography of Song Yue, Prince of E, Prince of E, says the “military leader Zhou Tong” taught Yue the “deployment of troops”.

Sinologist Hellmut Wilhelm theorized that Yue Fei purposely patterned his life after famous Chinese heroes from dynasties past. Apart from studying literature under his father, Yue Huo (Chinese: 岳和, d. late 1122), Yue loved to read military classics. Although his literacy afforded him the chance to become a scholar, which was a position held in much higher regard than the common soldiery during the Song, Yue chose the military path because there had never been any tradition of civil service in his family. Therefore, he had no reason to study the Confucian classics in order to surpass the accomplishments of his ancestors or to raise his family's social status to the next level. His fourth-generation ancestor, Yue Huan (Chinese: 岳涣), had served as a functionary on the lowest rung of the government ladder, but he was never a full-fledged member of the civil service rank. The paper goes on to say the Yue learned "archery, swordsmanship, and lanceplay" from Zhou Tong.

=== Bow ===
The wuxia novel The Story of Yue Fei says "the supernatural strength of the lord Yue was developed as a result of Zhou Tong's training. He taught him this skill called ‘the Bow for Supernatural Arms!’” The Yue Fei Biography states, "生有神力，未冠，挽弓三百斤，弩八石。學射与周侗，盡其術，能左右射"

"[Yue Fei] possessed supernatural power and before his adulthood, he was able to draw a bow of 300 catties and a Cross-bow of 8 stone. He learned archery from Zhou Tong. He learned everything and could fire with both hands."

The Biography of Song Yue, Prince of E states “Yue Fei began studying spear techniques at the age of eleven under a teacher named Chen Guang ... By the time he was thirteen he started studying archery under Zhou Tong ... When he became a general he used what he learned from Zhou Tong to train his troops, and they became renowned for their skill and discipline.”

According to a moral tale called “Yue Fei Studies the Archery” in You Er Hua Bao (Chinese: 幼儿画报 – “Children's Pictorial”) Magazine, a Chinese magazine tailored for children ages two through seven, Zhou taught Yue Fei the skill of the “far-sighted person”, which involved staring at the morning sunrise, to improve his eyesight for archery.

=== Eighteen Weapons of War ===
The Story of Yue Fei reads, "...because Zhou Tong was old, he was eager to teach the military arts for all the eighteen weapons to [Yue Fei]." The aforementioned tale about Yue Fei learning archery says "Yue Fei practiced diligently [under Zhou] and became a master of the eighteen weapons of war." The book Qigong Empowerment: A Guide to Medical, Taoist, Buddhist, Wushu Energy Cultivation reads, “Yue Fei began learning martial arts in his early childhood from Zhou Tong, mastering many martial arts systems and all 18 primary weapons.”

==== Spear ====
Zhou Tong is usually represented as a master of the Chinese spear through his association with Yue Fei, who, according to legend, created Xingyi boxing from the movements of this weapon. The Story of Yue Fei states Zhou "also taught Yue Fei the method of the spear." According to a famous Xingyi boxing manual, “...岳飞当童子时，受业于周侗师，精通枪法,"

"...when [Yue Fei] was a child, he received special instructions from Zhou Tong. He became extremely skilled in the spear method.”

The Story of Yue Fei says the Water Margin bandit Lin Chong was his student. In the Water Margin's 9th chapter entitled “Chai Jin Keeps Open House For All Bold Men, Lin Chong Defeats Instructor Hong in a Bout with Staves”, it reads, “Chai Jin said to the man, whom he called Arms instructor Hong: ‘This is Arms instructor Lin who teaches the art of spears and staves in the Eastern Capital's Imperial Guards.’”

==== Swords ====
Young Zhou wielding a broadsword.

Meeting Zhou Tong by Chance reads, “The steel blades of [Zhou Tong's] double swords shone as bright as snow in his hands. Now he was giving a performance of his swordplay [in front of several royal-looking people]. How did he play? How he did play? Ha! How could this be called swordplay! He looked like a snowball, as if he were totally wrapped in snow! He performed his swordplay extremely well!” The tale continues on to emphasize his skill was so good that even if a person threw a bowlful of writing ink at him during his swordplay, not a single drop of it would land on his white clothing.

According to The Story of Yue Fei, Zhou had an intimate knowledge of Chinese sword history. Yue Fei says, “Formerly I have heard my late teacher [Zhou] mention that any truly sharp sword can sever a dragon in water and cut down a rhinoceros on land and that there is an origin for each of the famous swords, like the Dragon Stream Sword, the Tai O Sword, the White Rainbow Sword, the Purple Lightning Sword, the Sword of Fish Intestine, the Moxieh Sword, Gan Jiang’s Sword, the Sword of Great Tower and others.”

The book Four Masters Of Chinese Storytelling: Full-length Repertoires Of Yangzhou Storytelling On Video reads, "During Wu Song's stay in the capital, he studies the swordplay of the 'Rolling dragon sword' from the senior master, Zhou Tong."

== Civilian ==
None of Yue Fei's biographies--Yue Fei Biography, The Story of Yue Fei or Biography of Song Yue, Prince of E—ever mention any kind of Kung fu styles in connection with Zhou Tong. The following skills come from sources not originating from the Song dynasty.

=== Chuojiao ===
Chuojiao is an external northern Chinese boxing style famous for its deceptive footwork and wide array of kicking techniques. One legend states a wandering Taoist named Deng Liang (Chinese: 邓良) created the style during the Song dynasty when he used a Chinese abacus to expand the 18 basic leg attacks to 108. From Deng, the style passed to Zhou Tong, who supposedly taught it to Yue Fei. Because of his popularity, Yue Fei is often considered the progenitor of the style. According to the book Jiuzhuan Lianhuan Yuanyangtui (Chinese: 九转连环鸳鸯腿), practitioners of "Nine Ring Mandarin Duck Chuojiao" consider Zhou Tong their founder.

Chuojiao is alternatively known as the "Water Margin Outlaw style" and Yuānyāng Tuǐ (Chinese: 鴛鴦腿 - "Mandarin Duck Leg"). In the Water Margin's twenty-ninth chapter, entitled "Wu Song, Drunk, Beats Jiang the Gate Guard Giant", it mentions Wu Song using the "Jade Circle-Steps with Duck and Drake feet". One Northern Praying Mantis manual mentions Lin Chong as the thirteenth master (out of eighteen) invited to Shaolin to teach his "'Mandarin ducks' kicking technique". This links together Zhou Tong's historical and folklore students Yue Fei, Wu Song and Lin Chong and Chuojiao and Mantis fist boxing.

=== Eagle Claw ===
Eagle Claw is an external northern Chinese boxing style known for its powerful gripping techniques, Qinna joint-locking, pressure point strikes, and acrobatic leaping. According to Yang Jwing Ming, "Yue, Fei created for his troops two new styles of Wushu. The first [was Xingyi]. The second style, which he created out of external Wushu, was Eagle Claw (鷹爪), a style which put a major emphasis on Qin Na (擒拿). The external style, because it was learn more easily, and because it had immediately practiced techniques, mad Yue's troops successful in battle.”

Popular legend states Zhou Tong taught a joint-locking style known as “Elephant” to Yue Fei, who then expanded it to create the Yībǎi Lingbā Qínná (Chinese: 一百零八擒拿 – “108 Seize-Grab”) fighting-techniques, 108 being a recurring mystical number in Chinese culture. According to Eagle Claw Grandmaster, Lily Lau, “Ngok-Fei inherited this set of techniques from Chow Tong in Shaolin.” Leung Shum states Yue Fei taught his soldiers the "fighting techniques he had learned from...Jow Tong." This style is fabled to have been used by the Yue Family Army to combat the occupying Jin armies who invaded China during the Jìngkāng (Chinese: 靖康) reign era of Emperor Qinzong. However, there is no historical evidence to support the claim that Zhou Tong taught Elephant style to Yue Fei.

The Secrets of Eagle Claw Kung Fu: Ying Jow Pai comments, "...Ngok Fei’s techniques, known as Ying Kuen, acquired a fierce reputation throughout China. Known as the '108 Locking Hand Techniques' or Ying Sao (Eagle Hand), the system consisted primarily of handwork, varying from simple blocking and punching to more complicated grappling, emphasizing the use of grabbing, locking, and pressure point strikes ... Enraged by their leader's tragic demise, Ngok Fei's soldiers left the service of the King [of China]. They wandered to all parts of China, some of them continuing their practice of the 108 Locking Hand Techniques. In this way, Ying Sao spread and survived the political and social upheavals of thirteenth-century China. In time, the system found its way back to its roots – the Shaolin Monastery where Ngok Fei had studied with Jow Tong years before."

In Chinese, elephant is pronounced Xiàng (Chinese: 象). However, the same character can also mean "shape, form, or appearance". The elephant style in question is a mistranslation of xiang, which actually refers to Xiàng Xíng Quán (Chinese: 象形拳 - "Imitation Boxing"), a fighting technique which emphasizes the imitation of the offensive and defensive actions of a certain animal or person, in this case an eagle.

=== Drunken Eight Immortals ===
Drunken Eight Immortals is an external Chinese boxing style known for imitation of the swaying and stumbling of a drunkard. Meeting Zhou Tong by Chance says,

“He [Zhou] practiced ‘Drunken Eight Immortals’ boxing’. He had just finished two movements. What two movements? The first movement was when he [screamed], fell down, stretched out his left leg straight in the air, rolled his right leg under his crotch and clutched his two [swords] under his left and right armpit...This was the first movement in ‘Eight Immortals’ boxing’: ‘Iron Staff Li kicks over the Oven-of-Immortality Pills’. Then he changed into the next movement, he soared into the air...holding his two [swords] pointing upwards. What is that movement called? It's called: ‘Master Han Xiang lets loose the purple swallows’. You see, he was extremely good at ‘Drunken Eight Immortals’ boxing’. How good was he? He was so good, that he had tricked one of his fellow boxers to end up muddle-headed."

=== Hard Qigong ===
Hard Qigong is any set of internal and external preparatory exercises created in pre-modern China to drastically toughen a practitioner's body to deflect or absorb an opponent's attack without serious injury. Zhou Tong is said to be linked to a series of these exercises according to thirteenth generation lineage Tai He ("Great Harmony") Wudangquan Master Fan Keping (Chinese: 范克平), a collector of rare Kung fu manuals. One of these qigong exercises is called the Shènzi bādà Qígōng (Chinese: 肾子八大奇功 - "Testicle Eight Outstanding Techniques"). A book of this style supposedly appeared during the Ming dynasty and was taught on Wudang Mountain. It became a "hereditary style", taught only to close family members. Other styles include the Hǔ Xiào Jīn Zhōng Zhào (Chinese: 虎啸金钟罩 – “Tiger Shouting Golden Bell Exercise"), Tie Bu Shan ("Five Phoenix Iron Shirt Work") and the Wu Feng Qi Ming Gui Xi Su ("Five Phoenix Combined Shouting Tortoise Resting Method"). Zhou Tong supposedly learned these skills from an “unknown master” and passed it along. During the Ming dynasty, Daoist priest Deng Kun Lun (Chinese: 邓坤伦) is fabled to have learned the set and later published a book in 1426 called Dà Sòng Quān Nèi Dì Yī Gāo Shǒu Zhōu Tóng Zhēn Chuán Hǔ Xiào Jīn Zhōng Zhào Fú Qì Liàn Xíng Mì Shù (Chinese: 大宋圈内第一高手周侗真传虎啸金钟罩服气炼形秘术 - “Great Song Circle Internal Sequence First Zhou Tong True Line Tiger Shouting Golden Bell Exercise Build Secret Technique”). There is a VCD series about this set of qigong exercises.

Meeting Zhou Tong by Chance states Zhou Tong was walking down the far side of a tall bridge when he noticed a large young man walking up in his direction while looking down at his own feet. Thinking the young man to be a martial arts master wanting to embarrass Zhou by knocking off the bridge with a shoulder strike, Zhou began to swallow air with a subtle “Hm!” and channeled all of his energy to his right shoulder. The skin of his shoulder turned red then purple and became hard as rock underneath his clothing. When the two men brushed shoulders, the young man was nearly knocked off of the bridge and the pain caused saliva to pour from his mouth. The attack left him weak in the knees and one side of his body was completely numb. But the incident was a misunderstanding. The young man was none-other-than his future student, the Water Margin bandit Wu Song who was looking down at his feet to avoid large water puddles born from a freak rain shower.

=== X-ray eyes ===
Meeting Zhou Tong by Chance also says,

“The moon was shining brightly, everything was clear to see, the old man [Zhou] only had to see half of the man Wu Song, who was standing behind a brick wall]: Here was a truly handsome man, a real masculine person. Just look at his bones and muscles, how well built! Why? Could he even see his bones? Well, what kind of eyes didn't the old master have! Not only could he see through the bones, he could even see through to the marrow of the bones! His eyes were just like the X-rays of our hospitals, he could screen you! The very moment he saw you, he would know...”

This is very similar to the skill of the “far-sighted person” as taught to Yue Fei by Zhou.

Masters with X-ray eyes appear frequently within Chinese folklore. According to the book To Live As Long As Heaven and Earth: Ge Hong's Traditions of Divine Transcendents, immortals were able to read a person's skeletal structure to tell if they were fated to become immortals themselves. For instance, the Hagiography of the Immortal Wang Yuan (Chinese: 王遠) states he was traveling through the Wu state on his way to Mount Guacang when he spied the peasant Cai Jing (Chinese: 蔡經). Wang could tell “...his bones and physiognomy indicated that [Cai] was fit for [eventual] transcendence.”

== Links to other styles ==
Zhou Tong can be linked to numerous other styles through his historical and folklore students.

=== Fanzi ===
Fanzi is an external northern Chinese boxing style known for its rapid punches that are said to be “as fast as lightning and thunderclaps”. The 'Fanzi Quan ballad' reads: “Wu Mu has passed down the Fanzi Quan which has mystery in its straightforward movements.” Wu Mu (Chinese: 武穆 – “Majestic Martial”) was a Posthumous name given to Yue Fei after his death. Zhou is often considered a master of this style, not only because of his association with Yue Fei, but also because Fanzi is usually taught in unison with Chuojiao boxing. There is a derivative of the two called Chuojiao Fanzi boxing.

=== Praying Mantis ===
Northern Praying Mantis is an external northern Chinese boxing style known for its Qinna joint-locking and distinctive Tángláng Gōu (Chinese: 螳螂勾 - "praying mantis hook") hand formation. There are many legends surrounding the creation of Northern Praying Mantis boxing. One attributes the creation of Mantis fist to the Song dynasty when Abbot Fu Ju (Chinese: 福居), a legendary persona of the historical Abbot Fu Yu (Chinese: 福裕) (1203–1275), invited Wang Lang (Chinese: 王朗), the style's founder, and seventeen other masters to come and improve the martial arts of Shaolin. The Abbot recorded all of the techniques in a manual called the Mishou (Chinese: 祕手 – “Secret Hands”) and later passed it onto the Taoist priest Shen Xiao. This manual supposedly disappeared until the Qianlong reign era when it was published under the name Luohan Xing Gong Duan Da Tuo Pu (Chinese: 罗汉行功短打 - Arhat exercising merit short strike illustrated manuscripts). Some sources place the folk manuscript's publication on the “sixteenth day of the third month of the spring of 1794”.

Zhou Tong's connection to the art comes from a list within the Luohan Xinggong Duan Da manuscript. The work individually lists each of the eighteen masters and their contribution. Yan Qing (#7), the adopted son of Lu Junyi and Zhou's fictional grandstudent, is listed as a master of "Sticking, Grabbing, and Falling" and Lin Chong (#13) is listed as a master of “Mandarin ducks kicking technique” (Chuojiao). The manual records Wang Lang “absorbed and equalized all previous techniques” learned from the 17 other masters to create Mantis Fist.

The 18 Masters Invited to Shaolin
#	Name	Technique	Master
1	Chang Quan	Long-range Boxing	Emperor Taizu
2	Tonbei	Through the Back	Han Tong
3	Chan Feng	Wrap Around and Seal	Zhang En
4	Duanda	Close-range Strikes	Ma Ji
5	Keshou Tongquan	Blocking Hands and Following Through Fist	Jin Xiang
6	Gou Lou Cai Shou	Hooking, Scooping and Grabbing Hands	Liu Xing
7	ZHANNA DIEFA	METHODS OF STICKING, GRABBING, AND FALLING	YAN QING
8	Duan Quan	Short Boxing	Wen Yuan
9	Hou Quan	Monkey Boxing	Sun Heng
10	Mien Quan	Cotton Fist	Mien Shen
11	Shuailue Yingbeng	Throwing-Grabbing and Hard Crashing	Huai De
12	Gunlou Guaner	Ducking, Leaking and Passing through the Ears	Tan Fang
13	YUANYANG JIAO	MANDARIN DUCKS KICKING TECHNIQUE	LIN CHONG
14	Qishi Lianquan	Seven Postures of Continuous Fist Strikes	Meng Su
15	Kunlu Zhenru	Hand Binding and Grabbing	Yang Gun
16	Woli Paochui	Explosive Strikes into the Hollow Body Parts	Cui Lian
17	Kao Shou	Close Range Hand Techniques	Huang You
18	Tanglang	Praying Mantis	Wang Lang

Historically, this list is erroneous because Emperor Taizu lived in the late 10th century and the Lin Chong and Yan Qing from the Water Margin are fictional characters based in the 12th century. Also, the historical Abbot Fu Yu lived towards the end of the Southern Song dynasty. Even if the gathering was held then and they had truly existed under their fictional personas, Lin Chong and Yan Qing would have died of old age long before this time. Plus, a full one third of the masters listed all come from fictional novels. Lin Chong and Yan Qing come from the Water Margin and Emperor Taizu (#1), Han Tong (#2), Zhang En (#3) and Huai De (#11) come from the Fei Long Quan Zhuan (Chinese: 飞龙全传 – “The Complete Flying Dragon Biography”). In addition, most legends place Wang Lang living in the late Ming dynasty.

=== Xingyi ===
Xingyi is an internal northern Chinese boxing style with five interchangeable fist attacks, based on the Five Chinese elements, and 10 or 12 animal imitation forms (depending on branch). One legend attributes the style to the Song dynasty when Yue Fei supposedly created linear fist attacks based upon the “thrusting” motions of the Chinese spear. According to the book Henan Orthodox Xingyi Quan written by Pei Xirong (Chinese: 裴锡荣) and Li Ying’ang (Chinese: 李英昂), Xingyi Dai Longbang "于乾隆十五年为“六合拳”作序云：“岳飞当童子时，受业于周侗师，精通枪法，以枪为拳，立法以教将佐，名曰意拳，神妙莫测，盖从古未有之技也。"

"...wrote the 'Preface to Six Harmonies Boxing in the 15th reign year of the Qianlong Emperor [1750]. Inside it says, '...when [Yue Fei] was a child, he received special instructions from Zhou Tong. He became extremely skilled in the spear method. He used the spear to create methods for the fist. He established a method called Yi Quan [意拳]. Mysterious and unfathomable, followers of old did not have these skills. Throughout the Jin, Yuan and Ming Dynasties few had his art. Only Ji Gong [Ji Longfeng] had it."

According to one source, “there is no name below the text [of the "Preface to Six Harmonies"] and there is no evidence Dai actually wrote it. While most Xingyiquan practitioners consider the ["Preface"] to be a document of historical value, more and more researchers doubt its authenticity. Some even claim it is a forgery made out in Shanxi at the end of the 19th century. This, coupled with the fact that the Yue Fei Biography only mentions Zhou teaching Yue archery and not the spear, means Zhou's connection with the art is only legendary. In his book Xíngyì Quán Shù Jué Wēi (Chinese: 形意拳术抉微), author Liu Dian Chen (Chinese: 刘殿琛) mentions that some military works wrongly consider Zhou Tong the founder of Xingyi.

However, others still assert that Zhou has connections with the art. Shaolin Wong Kiew Kit, author of the Art of Shaolin Kung Fu: The Secrets of Kung Fu for Self-Defense Health and Enlightenment, writes, “Xingyiquan was developed by the great marshal of the Song Dynasty, Yue Fei ... Like Taijiquan which came later, Xingyiquan is generally not considered as a form of Shaolin Kungfu but it was derived from Shaolin. Yue Fei's teacher was Zhou Tong, a Shaolin master.” According to Yang Jwing Ming, "Yue, Fei created for his troops two new styles of Wushu. The first which he taught to the troops came from his internal training, and led to the creation of Xingyiquan. The second style, which he created out of external Wushu, was Eagle Claw..."

== See also ==
- Media about Zhou Tong
