= Cultural depictions of Zhou Tong =

Cultural depiction

Zhou Tong, the archery teacher of Song dynasty General Yue Fei, has appeared in black-and-white films, wuxia novels, and folktales. He mainly appears in material dealing with Yue Fei, but also in media about his other students and his own biography and comic book.

== Film and television ==
- Yuè Fēi (Chinese: 岳飛) (1940). Zhou was portrayed by Huang Shou Nian (Chinese: 黄寿年).
- Jīn Zhōng Bào Guó (Chinese: 尽忠报国 – "Serve the Country Loyally") (1940). Zhou was portrayed by Li Ming (Chinese: 黎明, not to confuse with Leon Lai, a similarly named actor). The name of this movie comes from the famous tattoo on Yue Fei's back.
- Yuè Fēi Chū Shì (Chinese: 岳飛出世 – "The Birth of Yue Fei") (1962). Zhou was portrayed by Jing Ci Bo (Chinese: 靓次伯). A ten-year-old Sammo Hung played young Yue Fei. This film was largely based on The Story of Yue Fei.
- Eight Thousand Li of Cloud and Moon (Chinese: 八千里路雲和月) is a 1988 Taiwanese television series based on the story of Yue Fei. Hong Kong actor Kenny Ho played Yue Fei while Lu Fung appeared as Zhou Tong.

Veteran martial arts actor Yu Chenghui (Chinese: 于承惠), who played the villain "Wang Renzhe" in Shaolin Temple (1982) and "Master Shadow-Glow" in Seven Swords (2005), has expressed interest in playing Zhou in a future movie. In an interview, Mr. Yu said he never shaved his famous beard for any role, even at the request of movie producers, because he wanted to portray the "Shaanxi knight-errant Iron Arm, Zhou Tong".

Shortly after filming New Police Story in 2004, Jackie Chan reported that he would produce and play Yue Fei in a biopic about the general's life. Jaycee Chan, Jackie's son, will share the role as young Yue Fei. Jackie said, "There's already a rough draft right now, we've even found a co-star. In fact, filming of 'Genghis Khan' is also under consideration, but it must be a good script, because a lot of people have filmed this story, and the story itself is complicated and randomized, so up to now, there isn't a concrete plan yet. And [the script for] 'Yue Fei' is nearly completed." He continues, "I think Yue Fei is a man with great sense of loyalty, so am I. I've been loyal to Golden Harvest, to friends and to my country!" Filming will not begin until Jackie finishes filming several other projects (including Rush Hour 3), but he is willing to work for reduced pay so he can work with his son. This is because he believes the box office results will be good. However, Director Stanley Tong says the role of Yue Fei could possibly go to Andy Lau. It has yet to be announced which actor will portray Zhou.

- The Patriot Yue Fei is an upcoming television series based on the biography of Yue Fei. Huang Xiaoming stars as the titular character while Yu Rongguang plays Zhou Tong.

== Literature ==
=== The Story of Yue Fei ===
Zhou is a minor character in Shuo Yue Quan Zhuan (Chinese: 說岳全傳 – The Story of Yue Fei), a popular wuxia fiction written by Qian Cai (Chinese: 钱彩) sometime during the reigns of the Kangxi and Yongzheng emperors (1661–1735) during the Qing dynasty. He first appears in Chapter 2 when he becomes the new teacher of the Wang household (some 7 chronological years after newborn Yue Fei and his mother are rescued from the Yellow River flood). In chapters three through four, he adopts Yue Fei as heir and student, trains all of his students in archery and the 18 weapons of war, enters them in a military cadet contest, and arranges a marriage for 16-year-old Yue Fei. In Chapter 5, Zhou becomes ill after a heated horse race with Yue and stays bedridden for 7 days before his death. Yue lives by his grave for five months before returning home to his mother and eventual taking a wife.

=== Yue Fei Biography ===
Zhou appeared in the fictional Yue Fei Zhuan (Chinese: 岳飛傳 – Yue Fei Biography) by Huanzhulouzhu (1902–1961). In this tale, Yue happens upon Zhou's military training hall in a neighboring town while chopping firewood in the forest. This should not be confused with the historical Yue Fei Biography written during the Song dynasty, but compiled with other such biographies in the Yuan dynasty.

=== Fictional biography ===
The wuxia paperback novel Tiě Bèi Jīn Dāo Zhōu Tóng Zhuàn (Chinese: 铁臂金刀周侗传 – "Iron Arm, Golden Sabre: The Biography of Zhou Tong"), written by Wang Yun Heng (Chinese: 汪运衡) and Xiao Yun Long (Chinese: 筱云龙), details the fictional adventures of Zhou as a young man. It has 451 pages, 72 chapters and reads "left-to-right" like an english language novel. Ten black-and-white line drawings sporadically appear throughout the publication to illustrate the action in a certain chapter. These pictures are reminiscent of the Manga genre (Click here to see these illustrations). This is now a very rare book. In 1986, only 66,000 copies were made.

=== Comic book ===
Zhou stars in a ten volume lianhuanhua-style comic book called Zhou Tong Zhuan Qi (Chinese: 周侗传奇 – "The Legend of Zhou Tong"). The plot takes place before the events of the Water Margin and The Story of Yue Fei (i.e. before he takes Yue Fei as his student). The plot revolves around his vow to the military to destroy the bandits of Lake Tai and his resistance against armies of the Liao dynasty. The last few pages of volume ten touches upon the four chapters that he appeared in The Story of Yue Fei.

Title of each volume
Vol.	Chinese	Translation	Pages
1	首战传捷报	Victory Report from the First Battle	126
2	大破石佛寺	Defeat of the (Monks of) Stone Buddha Temple	110
3	孤胆闯太湖	The Lone Soul Travels to Taihu (Lake Tai)	126
4	奇取同盟录	Obtaining the Records of the Alliance By Trickery	134
5	剿杀熊双飞	Killing the Bandit Xiong Shuangfei	118
6	联姻邈川关	Marriage at Miaochuan Pass	110
7	受困桃源山	Trapped in Mount Taoyuan	102
8	全歼赵都都	Being Destroyed At the Capital of Zhao	110
9	除暴芒山道	Ending the Tyranny on Mount Mang Road	126
10	名师出高徒	A Famed Teacher Produces A Great Disciple	110

=== Other ===
Young Zhou is mentioned as the younger martial arts brother of General Jin Tai (Chinese: 金台) in the book Jin Tai San Da Shaolin Si (Chinese: 金台三打少林寺 – "Jin Tai has three fights with the Shaolin Monastery"). Zhou's own fictional biographical novel was published in 1986, the same year as Jin Tai's book. Both have similar storylines that fit into an overall chronology and appear to have been written in congruence with each other.

== Storytelling ==
Zhou is either mentioned in or connected to the tales these storytellers of the following material sing about.The Story of Yue Fei is a favorite among Pingshu (Chinese: 评书) or Pinghua (Chinese: 评话) storytellers, which is a modern-day form of Shuoshu ("talk-story") storytelling that became popular in the Tang and Song dynasties. One of the most famous of these artists is Liu Lanfang (1944–present), a noted singer and actress. She first made a name for herself in 1972 when she sang the full-length script of The Story of Yue Fei. In September 1981, the Chunfeng Literature Publishing House published the 100-chapter pingshu script of Yue Fei's tale.

Yangzhou Pinghua (Chinese: 扬州评话 – "Yangzhou storytelling") is divided into major (Da shu) and minor (Xiao shu) texts. The Story of Yue Fei is one of the major texts, along with the Water Margin. One of the most famous singers of the Water Margin tale was Wang Shaotang (1889–1968). He compiled four scripts from the Water Margin tales about the bandits Wu Song, Shi Xiu and Lu Junyi and formed his own school of storytelling called the "Wang School Shui Hu".

=== Yue Fei Studies the Archery ===
According to a moral tale called "Yue Fei Studies the Archery" in You Er Hua Bao (Chinese: 幼儿画报 – "Children's Pictorial"), a Chinese magazine tailored for children ages two through seven, young Yue Fei purchased a bow, a sword, and a spear to practice martial arts on his own since he did not have a teacher to train him properly. One day when he was chopping fire wood, he passed by a village with a military training hall ran by a famous master. Yue Fei immediately asked the master to become his student, not even knowing that this person was none-other-than Zhou Tong. Zhou told the boy "Your skill in wushu is inadequate, so you must first train the eyes."

As a part of his training, Yue Fei began to stare directly into the morning sunrise. At first the training was hard because the bright sun hurt his eyes, but he continued to practice the skill of the "far-sighted person" for many years. One day, Zhou came to Yue Fei and pointed to an object high up in the sky. When he focused his trained vision, Yue saw that it was a lone goose. Zhou then directed Yue to scan some trees that were one hundred paces away. Yue again focused his vision and caught sight of two black cicadas on a tree. Zhou then laughed in approval and said "Now that your eyesight is practiced, I not only receive you as my student, but as my adopted son. I will now teach you wushu."

Yue Fei practiced diligently and became a master of the eighteen weapons of war. He could draw a 300-catty bow and, with a "whiz" of the arrow, shoot a leaf from 100 paces away. The moral of the story is that achievements are only made through diligent practice. The magazine then states it is very dangerous to stare into the sun and that this tale is only used to exemplify hard work.

=== How Wu Song becomes Zhou's student ===
The following tale alternatively known as "Meeting Zhou Tong By Chance" and "Swordplay under the Moon" belongs to the "Wang School of Shui Hu" Yangzhou storytelling. It acts as a Shu wai shu (Chinese: 书外书 – "Story outside of the story"), meaning it takes place during the Water Margin, but is outside of the main storyline. The tale takes place after Wu Song kills a man-eating tiger, resists the charms of his sister-in-law and accepts a mission from the Magistrate to transport money to Kaifeng, but before he becomes a bandit. It explains how he came to learn swordplay from Zhou Tong:

Wu was given orders to travel on assignment to the eastern Song capital of Kaifeng after becoming a constable for the Yanggu District police force in Shandong province. When he arrived in Kaifeng, Wu took his introduction letter to the office of the local administration building and retired to an inn to await his summons. The following day, he left his inn to explore the bustling city.

The city of Kaifeng was one of the largest in the world at this time and it was full of various kinds of shops and heavy traffic from people coming in and leaving the city. As Wu walked along enjoying the organized chaos, the sky changed color and it became a torrential down pour with rain the size of casks (a play on "raining buckets of water"). It rained so much that waves flowed across the ground and mist rose around the houses. The rain hurt the top of Wu's head so he huddled under the roof of a small shop along with several other people vying for safety. But as soon as it started, the rain suddenly stopped.

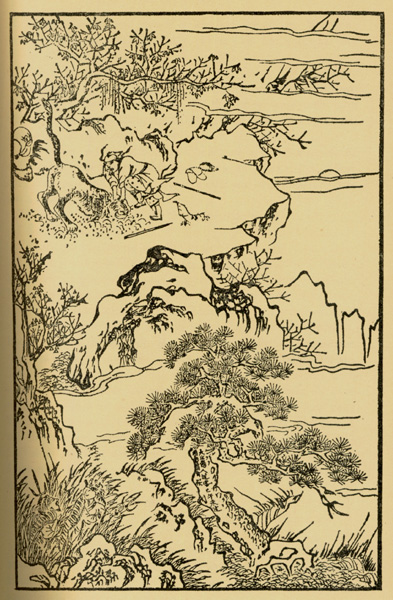
Wu Song killing a man-eating tiger (top left).

Wu continued on his way when he came to a large Chinese style bridge. It was called the Tianhan Bridge. It was arched, so people had to use steps to ascend to the top. When he stepped onto the bridge, Wu lifted up his clothing and looked down at his feet so he could avoid the huge puddles of water left from the freak rain shower. Unbeknownst to him, he was walking directly towards an elderly man who was descending the stairs right above him. Wu continued to walk up the bridge without looking in front of him. This old man was Zhou Tong and he was in a hurry. When Zhou saw Wu approaching him on the bridge without watching in front of him, the old master took the large young man to be another martial arts master who wished to tarnish Zhou's reputation by throwing him off the bridge with a shoulder strike. So Zhou prepared for a counter-attack and began to swallow air with a subtle "Hm!" and directed his energy to his right shoulder, which turned red then purple and became as hard as rock underneath his clothing. When the two men brushed shoulders, despite being a master of Iron Shirt and Drunken Eight Immortals boxing, Wu was nearly knocked off the bridge and the pain caused saliva to pour from his mouth. The attack left him weak in the knees and one side of his body was completely numb. He thought after all of his years of martial arts practice his body was nearly invincible, but he had met his superior in Zhou. Instead of cursing and reprimanding the old man, Wu held his tongue, which greatly impressed Zhou. In lieu of a kind word, Zhou simply bowed in apology and went on his way since he was in a terrible rush.

After Zhou disappeared into the bustling crowd, Wu rubbed his shoulder and returned to his inn. He ate his lunch and supper in turn, but felt it was too early to go to bed. So he went outside into a quiet courtyard behind the inn to do a little Shadowboxing underneath the starry nighttime sky. He untied his belt and wrenched it to the left and right until it was very tight and tied it into a knot. He then focused his energy and began to practice his Drunken Eight Immortals boxing. But before he was even half way done with his routine, the loud screams of another person's martial arts practice interrupted his concentration. So he grabbed a bench to steady himself on and looked over the top of a brick wall that opened into the hall of a large mansion to the east of the inn.

In the middle of the hall sat three tables laden with all the myriad kinds of food. But the stately-looking people attending this sumptuous feast were underneath the eaves of the hall watching a person practice his swordplay in the manor's courtyard. This person was none-other-than Zhou and he had his beard tied into a knot so he would not accidentally cut it off with his double swords. Zhou wielded his swords to and fro and did it so fast that the flashes of light cast from the blades made it look like his entire body was wrapped in snow. Even if a person threw a bowlful of writing ink at him, not a single drop of it would tarnish his clothing. Wu became mesmerized by Zhou's display of superior swordsmanship. When he twirled around and ended up facing in his direction, Wu recognized Zhou as the old man he had bumped into on the bridge earlier in the day. He realized that Zhou must be a great master adapt in the art of the "deep breath" technique.

During his practice, Zhou let out a mountain-crumbling scream and fell onto his back while kicking one leg into the air. Wu felt sorry for Zhou because he thought maybe the man was too old to practice the martial arts and had lost his balance. However, Zhou screamed once more and this time he shot high into the sky with his swords pointed upward towards the Moon. After watching him land and perform a few punches and kicks, it finally dawned on Wu that Zhou was indeed practicing the boxing routines of the immortals Iron-Crutch Li and Han Xiang from the Drunken Eight Immortals style. Zhou was so good at this style that his performance once caused a fellow warrior to become intoxicated. Puzzled, Wu recalled that his own martial arts master had told him there were only two people in the world (namely he and his master) who could perform such boxing, but Zhou also knew the style. Because Zhou's performance was so great, Wu went against the rules of etiquette and shouted praise from the top of the wall.

Zhou accepts Wu as his student.

This shouting interrupted Zhou before he could finish the forms for the rest of the Eight Immortals. He spun around and asked his aristocratic audience who it was that was shouting praise of his performance. But they were unable to answer because their snobbery prevented them from noticing anything outside of their own amusement. However, one of their level-headed servants heard the noise and pointed towards the brick wall. Zhou used his magical X-ray eyes to peer through the brick wall and into Wu's bone structure to see he was a special person indeed. When Wu praised Zhou's performance, he formed an instant friendship with the old man. Zhou invited Wu over the wall to partake in the festivities.

When Zhou asked for his name, he was delighted to learn Wu Song was the same fellow who became famous for killing a man-eating tiger with his bare hands on Jingyang Mountain in Shandong province the previous year. When Wu learned who Zhou Tong was, Wu immediately dropped to his knees, knocked his head on the floor and pleaded to become his student. Wu was thrilled to meet this old generation master who was famous throughout the rivers and lakes for his skill in military and civilian martial arts. Zhou helped Wu up and began to teach him the "Rolling dragon" style of swordplay under the moon.

== See also ==
- Military and civilian combat arts of Zhou Tong
