= Zhou Tong (archer) =

Chinese archer (died 1121)

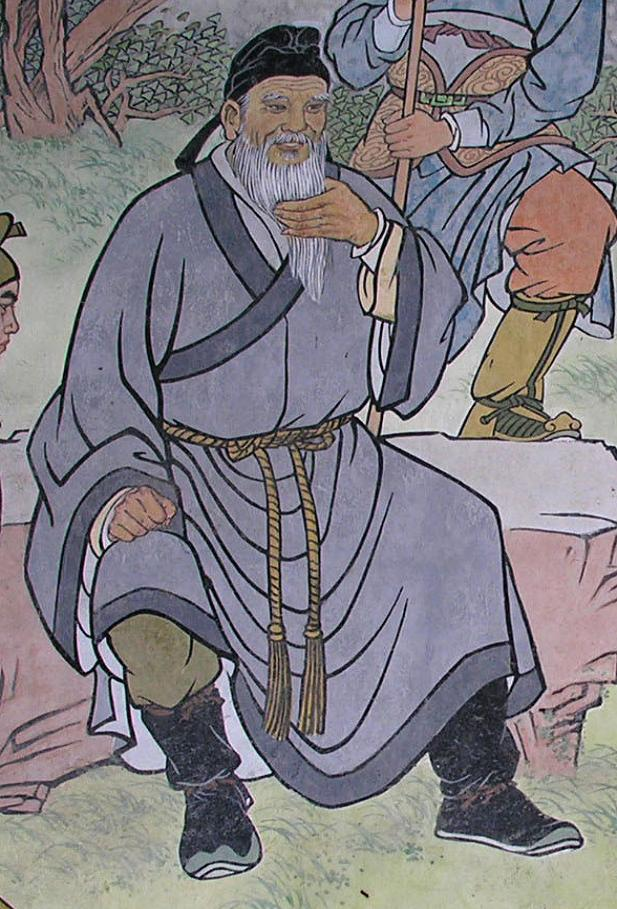
- Zhou Tong stroking his beard
- Born: Tangyin County, Anyang, Henan, Song dynasty
- Died: 1121; Tangyin County, Anyang, Henan, Song dynasty
- Relatives: Yue Fei (student)
- Military career
- Allegiance: Song dynasty
- Other work: Archery teacher; military arts tutor

Historical name
- Chinese: 周同
- Hanyu Pinyin: Zhōu Tóng
Transcriptions
Standard Mandarin
- Hanyu Pinyin: Zhōu Tóng
- Wade–Giles: Chou T'ung
Yue: Cantonese
- Jyutping: Jau1 Tung4

Fictional name
- Chinese: 周侗
- Hanyu Pinyin: Zhōu Dòng
Transcriptions
Standard Mandarin
- Hanyu Pinyin: Zhōu Dòng
Yue: Cantonese
- Jyutping: Jau1 Dung6

Nickname
- Traditional Chinese: 鐵臂膀
- Simplified Chinese: 铁臂膀
- Hanyu Pinyin: Tiě Bèibǎng
- Literal meaning: Iron Arm
Transcriptions
Standard Mandarin
- Hanyu Pinyin: Tiě Bèibǎng
- Wade–Giles: T'ieh Pei-pang
Yue: Cantonese
- Jyutping: Tit3 Bei3-bong2; Tit3 Bei3-pong4

Zhou Tong (Chinese: 周同 and 周侗; pinyin: Zhōu Tóng; died late 1121) was the archery teacher and second military arts tutor of famous Song dynasty general Yue Fei. Originally a local hero from Henan, he was hired to continue Yue Fei's military training in archery after the boy had rapidly mastered spearplay under his first teacher. In addition to the future general, Zhou accepted other children as archery pupils. During his tutelage, Zhou taught the children all of his skills and even rewarded Yue with his two favorite bows because he was his best pupil. After Zhou's death, Yue would regularly visit his tomb twice a month and perform unorthodox sacrifices that far surpassed that done for even beloved tutors. Yue later taught what he had learned from Zhou to his soldiers and they were successful in battle.

With the publishing of Yue Fei's 17th folklore biography, The Story of Yue Fei (1684), a new, fictional Zhou Tong emerged, who differed greatly from his historical persona. Not only was he now from Shaanxi, but he was Yue's adopted father, a learned scholar with knowledge of the eighteen weapons of war, and his personal name was spelled with a different, yet related, Chinese character. The novel's author portrayed him as an elderly widower and military arts tutor who counted Lin Chong and Lu Junyi, two of the fictional 108 outlaws on which the Water Margin is based, among his former pupils. A later republican era folktale by noted Yangzhou storyteller Wang Shaotang not only adds Wu Song to this list, but represents Zhou as a knight-errant with supreme swordsmanship. The tale also gives him the nickname "Iron Arm", which he shares with the executioner-turned-outlaw Cai Fu, and makes the outlaw Lu Zhishen his sworn brother. Because of his association with the outlaws, he is often confused with the similarly named outlaw Zhou Tong.

Various wuxia novels and folk legends have endowed Zhou with different kinds of martial and supernatural skills. These range from mastery of the bow, double broadswords, and Chinese spear to that of Wudang hard qigong and even x-ray vision. Practitioners of Eagle Claw, Chuōjiǎo and Xingyi commonly include him within their lineage history because of his association with Yue Fei, the supposed progenitor of these styles. He is also linked to Northern Praying Mantis boxing via Lin Chong and Yan Qing. Wang Shaotang's folktale even represents him as a master of Drunken Eight Immortals boxing. However, the oldest historical record that mentions his name only says he taught archery to Yue Fei. Nothing is ever said about him knowing or teaching a specific style of Chinese martial arts.

Zhou has appeared in various forms of media such as novels, comic books, and movies. His rare 20th century biography, Iron Arm, Golden Sabre, serves as a sequel to The Story of Yue Fei because it details his adventures decades prior to taking Yue as his pupil. This was later adapted into a ten volume Lianhuanhua comic book. He also appears in a novel concerning one of his fictional martial arts brothers. He was portrayed by three different actors in a string of black and white Yue Fei films produced in the 1940s and 1960s, one of which featured a ten-year-old Sammo Hung as the lead. Veteran martial arts actor Yu Chenghui, who played the sword-wielding antagonist in Jet Li's Shaolin Temple, stated in a 2005 interview that he has always wanted to portray Zhou in a film.

== History ==
=== Mention in Yue family memoirs ===
On his deathbed, Yue Fei's third son Yue Lin (岳霖, 1130–1192 AD) asked his own son, the poet and historian Yue Ke (岳珂, 1183–post-1240), to complete Yue Fei's memoirs. This two-part memoir was completed in 1203, some sixty years after the general's political execution, but was not published until 1234. It was later abridged in 1345 and published in the Yuan dynasty's dynastic chronology History of the Song Dynasty under the title Biography of Yue Fei (chapter 365, biography 124). Zhou's mention in Yue Ke's memoir was only briefly summarized in the Yuan rewrite. It reads, "He [Yue Fei] learned archery from Zhou Tong. He learned everything and could fire with his left and right hands. After Tong's death, he would offer sacrifices at his tomb".

Western Washington University history professor Edward Kaplan explains Zhou was a "local hao" (豪 – "heroic (person)"). He comments Hao can also mean "a 'knight errant' in poetic translation, or in prosaic terms a professional strongman and bodyguard.'" This means Zhou was a local hero from Tangyin County, Anyang prefecture, Henan province (the same area as Yue Fei).

Historical and scholarly sources spell his personal name as 同 (Tong), meaning "same or similar". This differs from the spelling present in fictional sources, which will be further explained below. So, "周同" represents the historical archer.

=== Tutelage ===
Despite being literate, giving him a chance to become a scholar, young Yue Fei chose the military path because there had never been any tradition of full-fledged Confucian civil service in his family history. He would stay up all night reading military strategy books and idolized such great historical heroes as Guan Yu. However, the Yue family was much too poor to afford military lessons for their son, so, Yao Dewang, the boy's maternal grandfather, hired Chen Guang (陳廣) to teach the eleven-year-old how to wield the Chinese spear. Yao was very surprised when his grandson quickly mastered the spear by the age of thirteen. Zhou was then brought in to continue Yue's military training in archery. Dr. Kaplan describes Zhou as the "most important" of the two teachers.

A section of the Jin Tuo Xu Pian, the second part of Yue Ke's original published memoir, describes one of Zhou's archery lessons and reveals that he took other children as his pupils:

"One day, [Chou] T'ung gathered his pupils for an archery session and to display his ability put three arrows in succession into the center of the target. Pointing to the target to show grandfather [Yue Fei], he said: 'After you can perform like this, you can say you are an archer'. Grandfather thanked him and asked to be allowed to try. He drew his bow, let fly his arrow and struck the end of T'ung's arrow. He shot again and again hit the mark. T'ung was greatly amazed and subsequently presented to grandfather his two favorite bows. Thereafter grandfather practiced still more [until] he was able to shoot to the left and right, accurately letting fly the arrow as he moved. When he became a general he taught this to his officers and men so that his whole army became skilled at shooting to the left and right and frequently used this technique to crush the enemy's spirit".

The last sentence of the passage is similar to one from the Republican era Biography of Song Yue, Prince of E. But instead of teaching them his own technique, it states Yue taught what he had learned from Zhou to his soldiers who were victorious in battle.

=== Death ===
Zhou continued to teach the children until his death, prior to Yue's legal adulthood. Following his passing, Yue became extremely depressed since Zhou had been the greatest influence on his early life. Zhou's student would regularly visit his tomb on the first and fifteenth of every month with sacrifices of meat and wine and would shoot three arrows in succession with one of the two bows his tutor had presented him with (it is never mentioned whether any of Zhou's other archery pupils came to visit his tomb). Dr. Kaplan comments that this continuous unusual display of mourning "went far beyond the ceremonial appropriate for even a highly respected teacher". Noted Sinologist Hellmut Wilhelm claims even though the display of grief was genuine, it was also a way of emulating the stories of his heroic idols and "[establishing himself] in the public eye". Yue's father later followed him secretly to Zhou's tomb after striking him during an argument over his melancholic behavior. There, he saw him perform the unorthodox obediences involving the meat, wine, and three arrows. When he finally confronted him, the son confessed that "his gratitude for Chou's instruction could not be requited simply by the usual first and middle of the month ceremonies and so he ... shot off the three arrows to symbolize that Chou had been the source of his inspiration as an archer". Dr. Kaplan's states this happened just prior to Yue's entrance into the army and that the entire event served as a symbol for Yue's "entrance into responsible manhood".

The Chronology of Yue Wumu lists the events at Zhou's tomb happening in 1121 when Yue was nineteen, but Yue would have been eighteen in that year since he was born on "the fifteenth day of the second month of 1103". The author of the original source material was using xusui age calculation, in which a child is already considered one year old at birth. Since Yue joined the military shortly after Zhou's death, a relative time frame can be given for when he died. During the early months of 1122, the Song empire mobilized its armed forces to assist the Jurchen in confronting their common enemy, the Liao dynasty. Therefore, it appears that Zhou died in late 1121, before the call to arms was issued.

== Fiction ==
Zhou Tong's fictional life story can be pieced together from two sources: The Story of Yue Fei and Iron Arm, Golden Sabre. The Story of Yue Fei is a fictionalized retelling of Yue Fei's young life, military exploits, and execution. It was written by a native of Renhuo named Qian Cai (钱彩), who lived sometime between the reigns of the Kangxi and Qianlong emperors in the Qing dynasty. The preface dates the book's publication to 1684. It was deemed a threat by the Qing emperors and banned during the Qianlong era. In the novel, Zhou is portrayed as an elderly widower and Yue's only military arts tutor. The General's historical spear master Chen Guang is never mentioned. Zhou teaches Yue Fei and his sworn brothers military and literary arts from chapters two through five, before his death.

In the writing of his novel, Qian Cai used a different character when spelling Zhou's given name. Instead of the original character meaning "similar", it was changed to 侗, meaning "rude or rustic". So, "周侗" represents Zhou's distinct fictional persona. This spelling has even been carried over into modern day martial arts manuals.

Iron Arm, Golden Sabre was written by Wang Yun Heng and Xiao Yun Long and published in 1986. This novel, which serves as Zhou's own fictional biography, is a prequel to The Story of Yue Fei because it details his adventures decades prior to taking Yue Fei as his student. It follows his life as a young martial arts instructor in the Song army's Imperial guard, his struggles against the Xixia and Liao Tartar barbarian tribes and his tutelage of Water Margin outlaws. The last few chapters incorporate the storyline from the four chapters that he appears in The Story of Yue Fei. This was later adapted into a ten volume Lianhuanhua-style comic book called The Legend of Zhou Tong in 1987.

=== Early life and adulthood ===
Zhou is born in Shaanxi and trains in the martial arts from a young age. He is taken as one of the pupils of Shaolin master Tan Zhengfang (谭正芳) and, learning the true essence of Shaolin Kung Fu, becomes proficient in things both literary and martial. Tan's other students include the future generals Jin Tai (金台) and Zong Ze (宗澤) and the future Water Margin outlaws Sun Li and Luan Tingyu. As a young man, Zhou catches the attention of Judge Bao Zheng and enlists in the military as an officer. His superiors take note of his great skill after he helps his classmate General Jin battle Liao Tartars in northern China and install him as a teacher in the Capital Imperial Martial Arts School. The school has three teaching positions named in order of prestige: "Heaven," "Earth," and "Man." Since he has the greatest skill, he occupies the Heaven position. He uses this post and his friendship with General Zong to get their classmate Sun Li installed as the Superintendent of Forces of Dengzhou. Sun later becomes an outlaw under Chao Gai and helps defeat the evil Zhu Family, who learn military arts from his classmate Luan Tingyu.

As he grows older, Zhou becomes dissatisfied with politics because the Imperial court chooses to appease the northern barbarian tribes instead of standing against them. He then devotes himself wholeheartedly to his martial arts practice and creates several official and authoritative techniques including the "five step, thirteen lance piercing kick", which is a development of Shaolin Fanzi boxing, and the "Zhou Tong cudgel." He makes a concerted effort to transmit his martial efforts while teaching at the Imperial Martial Arts School and formally accepts two disciples: "Jade Unicorn" Lu Junyi and "Panther head" Lin Chong. Lu Junyi is a millionaire with vast land holdings and does not hold office, but Lin Chong inherits Zhou's position after his retirement, and continues to serve as the lead instructor for the 800,000 members of the Song army's Imperial Guard.

During this time, Zhou Tong also has an additional disciple named Wu Song. Wu Song becomes famous for killing a man-eating tiger with his bare hands and is appointed as a constable in his native Shandong. The county magistrate Sun Guoqin later sends Wu on a mission to Kaifeng with precious tiger bone balm in order to curry favor with influential personages. During his stay in the capital, he makes the acquaintance of Zhou. Zhou finds Wu to be a man of great strength, but feels that he lacks refinement in his martial technique and, therefore, offers guidance for Wu's training. Unfortunately, these two men only interact for a brief two months before Wu has to return home, never to see Zhou again.

Following his retirement, Zhou serves for a time as an advisor to General Liu Guangshi (劉光世), whose troops are garrisoned in Henan Province. But Zhou later becomes an outlaw himself after he aids the heroes of the Water Margin and is forced to flee from government forces. Meanwhile, he learns his elderly classmate Jin Tai is close to death and hurries to Shaolin (where the general had become a Buddhist monk after the murder of his family) to pay his last respects. As the oldest of Tan's pupils, Jin orders Zhou to find a talented youth to pass on all of his martial arts knowledge to. However, this reunion is cut short when the troops track him to Shaolin. He flees to Wine Spring mountain and lives in hiding for sometime before being invited by his old friend Wang Ming (王明) to become the precept of the Wang family in Unicorn Village.

=== Old age and death ===
One day, Zhou surprises the children with a written exam and leaves the classroom to speak with a visitor. Wang's son, Wang Gui (王贵), tricks their maid's son, Yue Fei, into completing their assignment while they go outside to play. After easily finishing the task at hand, Yue writes a heroic poem on a whitewashed wall and signs it with his name. The children then burst into the classroom upon learning of Zhou's forthcoming return and tell Yue to escape in order to avoid apprehension. The old teacher eventually discovers the ruse and, after marveling at Yue's impromptu ballad, asks Yue to fetch his mother, Lady Yao (姚夫人), for an important meeting. With the entire Wang household assembled in the main hall, Zhou asks the Lady for her blessing to have the boy as his adopted son and student. She consents and Yue takes his seat amongst Zhou's students the following morning. Because Zhou knows Yue is poor, he commands the four students to become sworn brothers. Zhou also begins to teach Yue all of the eighteen weapons of war.

Six years later, Zhou takes the group to visit his old friend, the abbot of a small Buddhist temple on the "Hill of Dripping Water". Thirteen-year-old Yue wanders behind the temple and finds the "Cave of Dripping Water", in which lives a magical snake. When it lunges at Yue, he dodges to one side and pulls on its tail with his supernatural strength, causing it to turn into an 18-foot-long (5.5 m), gold-plated spear named the "Supernatural Spear of Dripping Water". When they return home, Zhou begins to drill all of his students in the military arts—eighteen weapons of war, archery, and hand-to-hand combat. After three years of practice, Zhou enters them into a preliminary military examination in Tangyin in which sixteen-year-old Yue wins first place by shooting a succession of nine arrows through the bullseye of a target two hundred and forty paces away. After his display of marksmanship, Yue is asked to marry the daughter of Li Chun (李春), an old friend of Zhou's and the county magistrate who presided over the military exams. Father and son then returns home to their village.

Yue making obediences to Zhou on his death bed

Magistrate Li writes out a marriage certificate and dispatches a messenger to deliver the document to Yue Fei in Unicorn Village. Zhou and Yue sets out at dawn and travel back to Tangyin to thank the Magistrate for his generosity and kindness. There, Li prepares a great feast for them, but when food is brought out for any servants that might have accompanied them, Zhou comments that they had come on foot without help. Li decides to let Yue pick from any one of his thousands of horses because every able military man needs a strong steed. After finishing their feast, Zhou and Yue thank Li once again and leave Tangyin to return home. During their journey, Zhou recommends that Yue run the horse to test its speed. Yue spurs the horse on leaving Zhou in pursuit. When they reach the village gate, the two dismount and Zhou returns to his study where he feels hot from the race and removes his outer garments to fan himself. But he soon falls ill and stays bedridden for seven days. Then the book describes his death and burial:

"... his phlegm bubbled up and he died. This was on the fourteenth day of the ninth month in the seventeenth year of the Reign of Xuan He, and his age was seventy-nine ... Buddhist and Taoist Priests were asked to come and chant prayers, for seven times seven, namely forty-nine days. Then the body was taken up to be buried beside the Hill of Dripping Water".

Yue lives in a shed by his grave through the winter and in the second lunar month of the following year, his martial brothers come and pull the building down, forcing him to return home and take care of his mother.

The quoted death date is not only unreliable because the book is fiction, but also because the Xuan He reign era of Emperor Huizong lasted only seven years (1119–1125) and not seventeen. Although The Story of Yue Fei states Zhou died shortly before Yue took a wife, he historically died after Yue married. It is likely that the original author invented this fictional date.

=== Family ===
According to The Story of Yue Fei, Zhou was married with a son. But Zhou comments that his "old wife" died and his "small son" was killed in battle against the Liaos after leaving with the outlaw Lu Junyi to fight in the war. In The Legend of Zhou Tong, his wife is named Meng Cuiying (孟翠英) and his son is named Zhou Yunqing (周云清). He defeats Meng in a lei tai martial arts contest and wins her as his wife. But she is shortly thereafter kidnapped by the wicked monks of the Stone Buddha temple. Both Zhou and Meng eventually defeat the monks with their combined martial skills and later marry at the Miaochuan Pass in Hubei province.

Zhou adopts Yue

Zhou Yunqing first appears as a fierce, impulsive young man who rides his horse into the thick of enemy encampments wielding a long spear. He later dies in battle against the Liao dynasty. After his son's death, Zhou retreats to the Xiangguo Temple for a long mourning period. He later takes seven-year-old Yue Fei as his adopted son and sole heir years after the boy's father drowns in a great flood:

"I see that he [Yue Fei] is clever and handsome and I, an old man, wish to have him as my adopted son ... He need change neither his name nor his surname. I only want him to call me father temporarily so that I can faithfully transmit all the skills I have learned in my life to a single person. Later, when I die, all he has to do is to bury my old bones in the earth and not allow them to be exposed, and that is all".

However, after comparing events from The Story of Yue Fei and an account of Yue's life from the sixteenth-century work Restoration of the Great Song Dynasty: The Story of King Yue (大宋中興岳王傳), literary critic C.T. Hsia concluded "that his father did not [historically] die in the flood and that, although Yueh Fei showed almost filial regard for the memory of his teacher Chou T'ung 同 (not 侗), the latter had not been his adopted father". The Restoration of the Great Song was one of the earliest of four "historical novels" (fictionalized dynastic chronologies) written about Yue during the Ming dynasty, all of which predate The Story of Yue Fei. Despite the addition of popular legends, Xiong Damu (fl 1552), the author of The Story of King Yue, relied heavily on historical chronologies including Zhu Xi's (1130–1200) Outlines and Details Based on the T'ung-chien, Yue Ke's family memoir, and the Yuan dynasty's official Biography of Yue Fei to write his story. So, The Story of Yue Fei was the first full-blown fictionalized novel to introduce the adoption storyline.

=== Appearance and voice ===
Illustration of an elderly Zhou from Iron Arm, Golden Sabre

He is generally portrayed as a large elderly man with a powerful voice. A modern folktale by noted Yangzhou storyteller Wang Shaotang (1889–1968), whom folklore researcher Vibeke Børdahl called "the unrivaled master of this [the 20th] century", describes Zhou thus,

"He was beyond the age of fifty, he was more than fifty, and standing upright he measured about eight feet. His face had a golden tan, arched brows, a pair of bright eyes, a regular head form, a square mouth, a pair of protruding ears, and under his chin there were three locks of beard, a grizzled beard. On his head he wore a sky-blue satin scarf, and he was dressed in a stately sky-blue satin coat with a silken girdle, a pair of wide black trousers without crotch and satin boots with thin soles".

Heroes and religious masters with above normal height are a recurring theme in Chinese folklore. For instance, his student Wu Song is said to be over nine feet tall in the same folktale. In The Story of Yue Fei, the General simultaneously duels with two other warriors vying for first place in a military exam; one is nine feet tall and the other is eight feet tall. A Hagiography of the Taoist saint Zhang Daoling states he was over seven feet tall.

When Zhou is vocalized in "Yangzhou storytelling", he speaks in "Square mouth public talk", which is a manner of speaking reserved for martial heroes, highly respected characters, or, sometimes, lesser characters that pretend to be an important hero. Square mouth public talk is actually a mixture of two forms of dialogue: Fangkou and Guanbai. Fangkou (square mouth) is a manner of steady, yet forceful over pronunciation of dialogue that was possibly influenced by Northern Chinese opera. Guanbai (public talk) is monologue and dialogue that is sometimes used for "imposing heroes". This mixture of styles means Zhou Tong is treated as a highly regarded hero.

In her analysis of Yangzhou storytelling, Børdahl noted that the aforementioned tale about Zhou and Wu Song uses different forms of dialogue for both characters. Wu speaks square mouth utilizing standard Mandarin without rusheng (short glottal syllables). On the contrary, Zhou speaks squaremouth using the Yangzhou tone system, which does utilize rusheng syllables. Therefore, she believes "square mouth dialogue should at least be divided into two subcategories, namely the Wu Song variant—without rusheng, and the Zhou Tong variant—with rusheng".

=== Students ===
==== Water Margin outlaws ====
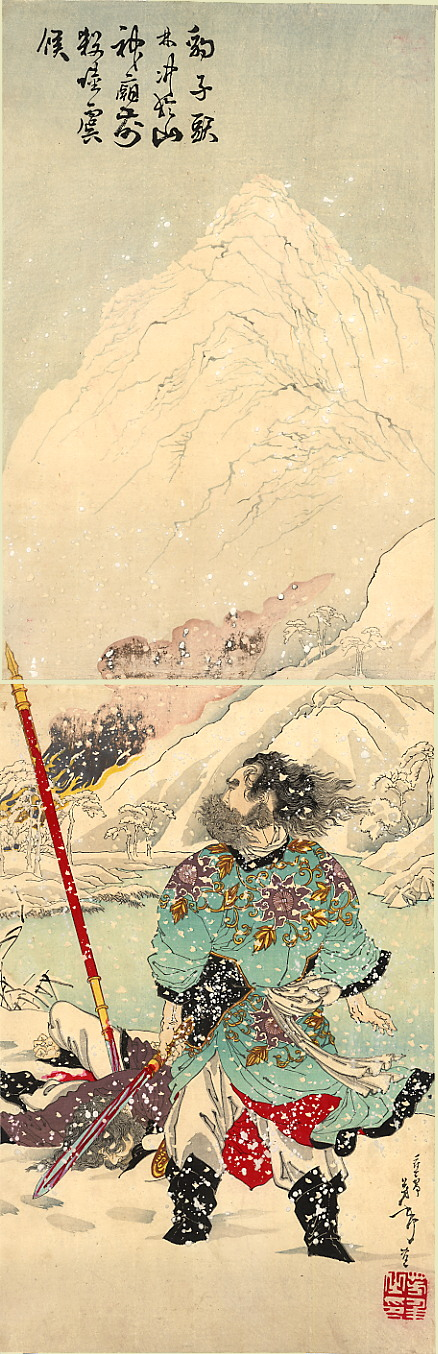
An 1886 block print by Yoshitoshi, depicting Lin Chong outside the Temple of the Mountain Spirit, after he has killed Lu Qian and all his other captors

The Water Margin (c. 1400) is a Ming dynasty military romance about one hundred and eight demons-born-men and women who band together to rebel against the lavish Song dynasty government. Lin Chong and Lu Junyi, two of these outlaws, are briefly mentioned as being Zhou's previous students in The Story of Yue Fei. They are not characters within the main plot, though, as both are killed by "villainous officials" prior to Zhou becoming precept of the Wang household. Most importantly, the two were not among his historical students since they are fictional characters.

Zhou's portrayal as their teacher is connected to a recurring element in Chinese fiction where Tang and Song dynasty heroes train under a "celestial master", usually a Taoist immortal, prior to their military exploits. C. T. Hsia suggests the mold from which all other similar teachers are cast is Guiguzi, master of the feuding strategists Sun Bin and Pang Juan, from the Yuan dynasty tale Latter Volume of the Spring and Autumn Annals of the Seven Kingdoms (七國春秋後集). Hsia goes on to say that Qian Cai, Yue's fictional biographer, associated Zhou with the outlaws because "most such teachers [in the military romance genre] are celestials" with at least two students. But in adopting this format, Qian reversed the traditional pattern of "celestial tutelage" since Zhou is written as a human, while his students are reincarnations of demons (Lin and Lu) and the celestial bird Garuda (Yue Fei).

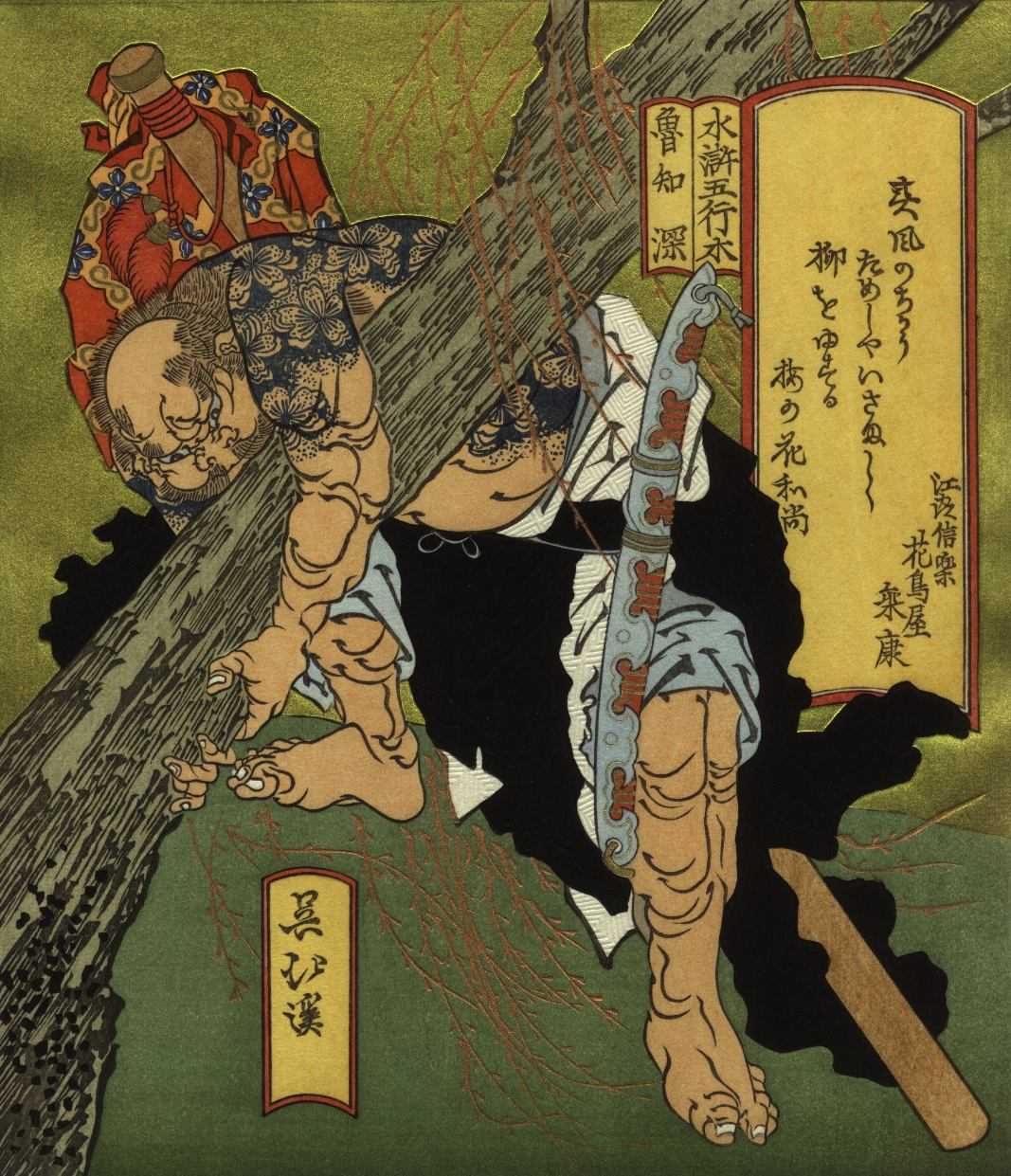
Zhou's sworn brother, the "Flowery Monk" Lu Zhishen

Although Lin and Lu have been connected to Zhou since the early Qing dynasty, Wu Song did not become associated with him until Wang Shaotang created a 20th-century folktale in which the two meet in Kaifeng. The tale takes place during Wu's mission to Kaifeng, but before the murder of his older brother Wu Dalang. Zhou teaches Wu the "Rolling Dragon" style of swordplay during the constable's one-month stay in the capital city. This tale was chapter two of Wang's "Ten chapters on Wu Song" storytelling repertoire, which was later transcribed and published in the book Wu Sung in 1959. It eventually carried over into the storyline of Iron Arm, Golden Sabre and, subsequently, The Legend of Zhou Tong. In the latter version, Wu instead learns Chuōjiǎo boxing from Zhou during a two-month stay in the capital.

Wang's tale portrays Zhou as an aging itinerant swordmaster with "a fame reverberating like thunder" throughout the underworld society of Jianghu. He is made the sworn brother of the outlaw "Flowery Monk" Lu Zhishen, a military officer-turned-fighting monk, who is, according to Hsia, first among the most popular protagonists of the Water Margin. He is also given the nickname "Iron Arm" (铁臂膀), which carried over into the title of his fictional biography Iron Arm, Golden Sabre. While the tale fails to explain the reason for the moniker, it does mention Zhou's ability to direct his qi to any part of his body to make it hard enough to overpower the "Iron shirt" technique of another martial artist. Furthermore, Zhou shares the same nickname with Cai Fu, an executioner-turned-outlaw known for his ease in wielding a heavy sword.

Because of his association with these outlaws, Zhou is often confused with the similarly named outlaw "Little Conqueror" Zhou Tong. In the Water Margin, this Zhou Tong is a bandit chief of Mount Peach Blossom whom Lu Zhishen beats for trying to forcibly marry the daughter of the Liu family. He dies later under the sword of Li Tianrun, an officer in the rebel army of Fang La. So, the connection between both Zhou's is based solely on the romanized transcription of their name.

==== Yue Fei ====
The Story of Yue Fei comments Lu Junyi is Zhou's last student prior to taking on seven-year-old Yue Fei and his three sworn-brothers Wang Gui, Tang Huai (湯懷) and Zhang Xian (張顯). He teaches them literary and military lessons on even and odd days. The novel says Yue is talented in all manners of "literary and military matters" and even surpasses the skill of Lin and Lu. After Yue acquires his "Supernatural Spear of Dripping Water", Zhou tutors all of his students in the eighteen weapons of war, but each excels with one in particular; Yue Fei and Tang Huai, the spear; Zhang Xian, the Hook-Sickle spear and Wang Gui, the Yanyue Dao. All of them learn the skill of archery in addition. Some of these and other children are mentioned in Yue Ke's memoir as being his grandfather's historical childhood friends, but they are never specified as being Zhou's students.

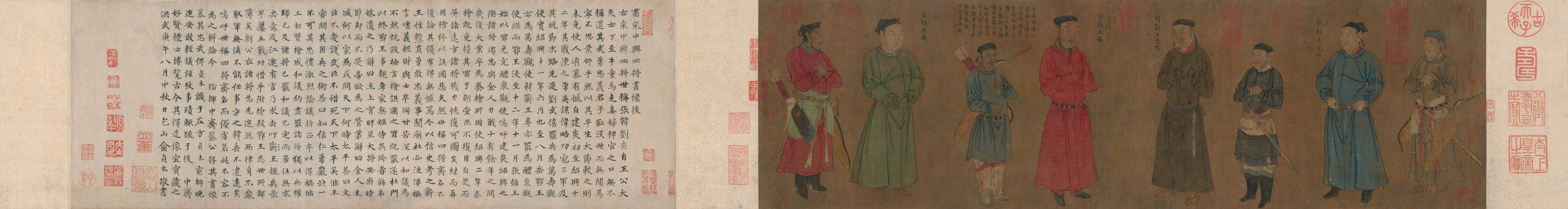
The "Four Generals of the Restoration" and their four attendants, painted by Liu Songnian during the Southern Song dynasty. Yue Fei is the second person from the left. It is believed to be the "truest portrait of Yue in all extant materials".

Books written by modern-day martial artists make many claims that are not congruent with historical documents or current scholarly thought. For instance, internalist Yang Jwing-Ming says Zhou was a scholar who studied martial arts in the Shaolin Monastery and later took Yue as his student after the young man worked as a tenant farmer for the official-general Han Qi (韓琦, 1008–1075). During this time, he learned all types of military weapons, horseback riding, and hand-to-hand combat. The General later created Xingyi and Eagle Claw boxing from his internal and external training under Zhou. However, history Prof. Meir Shahar notes that unarmed boxing styles did not develop at Shaolin until the late Ming dynasty. He also states that Ji family memoirs and Qing dynasty records suggest Xingyi was created hundreds of years after the death of Yue by a spearplayer named Ji Jike (fl. 1651). In addition, the appearance of Han Qi in the story is a chronological anachronism since he died nearly 30 years before Yue's birth. Yue historically worked as a tenant farmer and bodyguard for descendants of Han Qi in 1124 after leaving the military upon the death of his father in late 1122, but he learned from Zhou well before this time.

Eagle Claw Grandmasters Leung Shum and Lily Lau believe "Jow Tong" (the Cantonese rendering of his name) was a monk who brought young Yue to the Shaolin Monastery and taught him a set of hand techniques, which Yue later adapted to create his Ying Kuen (Eagle fist). Liang Shouyu states practitioners of Emei Dapeng Qigong believe Yue trained under Zhou as a child and competed to become China's top fighter at an early age. Their lineage story dictates Zhou also took Yue to a "Buddhist hermit" who taught him said qigong style. Northern Praying Mantis Master Yuen Mankai says Zhou taught Yue the "same school" of martial arts as he did his Water Margin students and that the General was the originator of the praying mantis technique "Black Tiger Steeling [sic] Heart". Although Martial arts historian Stanley Henning admits that Yue's biographies do not mention boxing, he says "he [Yue] almost certainly did practice some form of bare handed fighting" to prepare for his weapons training. But he does not suggest who Yue might have learned it from.

=== Martial arts ===
There is insufficient historical evidence to support the claim he knew any skills beyond archery. Contemporary records never once mention Zhou teaching Yue boxing. Despite this, various wuxia novels and folk legends have attributed many different military and supernatural skills to Zhou. These range from mastery of the bow, double swords and Chinese spear to that of Wudang hard qigong, Chuōjiǎo boxing and even X-ray vision. Wang Shaotang's folktale even represents him as a master of Drunken Eight Immortals boxing. In the Shaolin Temple of Henan province at the end of the Ming dynasty, the warrior monks were practicing leg techniques exercises and jumps that they attributed to Zhou Tong. There is a system of fighting called "The Shaolin legs and fists of Zhou Tong" (Shaolin Zhou Tong quantui) attributed to Zhou Tong. Mostly, Shaolin martial arts focusing in leg techniques and jumps are referring to Zhou Tong as the founder of their respective styles.

Zhou can also be linked to these combat arts through his historical and folklore students. Practitioners of Eagle Claw, Chuōjiǎo and Xingyi commonly include him within their lineage history because of his association with Yue Fei, the supposed progenitor of these styles. Yuen Mankai believes Zhou taught Lin Chong and Lu Junyi the "same school" of martial arts that was later combined with seventeen other schools to create Mantis fist. This combination of various schools refers to an eighteenth-century martial arts manual that describes the gathering of eighteen masters at the Shaolin Monastery that supposedly took place during the early years of the Song dynasty. Lin Chong and Yan Qing are listed as two of the eighteen masters invited, which means their skills of Mandarin Duck Leg and ground fighting are treated as two separate schools, instead of one. But he believes Mantis first was created during the Ming dynasty and was therefore influenced by these eighteen schools from the Song. He also says Lu Junyi taught Yan Qing the same martial arts as he learned from Zhou.

Very few references are made to the people who supposedly taught martial arts to Zhou. In The Legend of Zhou Tong, he learns as a child from a Shaolin master named Tan Zhengfang. Practitioners of Chuōjiǎo claim he learned the style from its creator, a wandering Taoist named Deng Liang. Practitioners of Geok Gar Kuen, a style attributed to Yue Fei, believe he studied under Han De, a "chivalrous person" from Shaanxi.

== In popular culture ==
Zhou has appeared in various kinds of media including novels, comic books, and movies. Apart from The Story of Yue Fei and Iron Arm, Golden Sabre, he appears in a novel based around his older martial arts brother, Jin Tai. A recent graphic novel of The Story of Yue Fei, deletes all mythological elements from the storyline and presents it in a historical manner. Instead of traveling from Hebei to Hubei to inspect land, Zhou travels from Shaanxi to Kaifeng City in Henan to visit an old friend who had been promoted to General. While en route to the capital city, Zhou takes note of a great famine plaguing the peasantry and even hears stories of some people resorting to cannibalism. However, when he arrives in Kaifeng, he sees the empire is wasting money on the construction of large imperial gardens, the court officials Cai Jing and Wang Pu have extravagant residencies, and hears that even eunuchs are rich because they are given high government posts. Upon locating his friend, Zhou is distressed to find him in stocks and shackles and being escorted to the farthest reaches of China by imperial guards. He later learns that the General had accidentally offended some court officials and was sentenced to permanent exile on some trumped up charges. Apparently having little or no money, Zhou decides to visit Wang Ming in Hubei (mistakenly called Hebei) and becomes the estate's tutor.

Another noticeable difference in the storyline takes place when Zhou travels with his teenage disciples to visit his friend the Abbot. Instead of Yue wandering behind the temple to battle the magical snake, he stays with Zhou and the Abbot, while the other disciples go off to explore. Zhou watches as the Abbot tests Yue's strength by asking him to move an ornate 300-pound copper stove dating from the Han dynasty. The abbot then lifts a stone floor tile and presents the boy with a large book on military strategy. He goes on to tell Yue how he was once a great soldier who fought in campaigns against the Liao and Western Xia empires, but became a monk after the Song agreed to become a vassal of each state. He later made a name for himself by teaching military skills to youths from the surrounding area. Since he has no heir of his own, the Abbot presents Yue with his own personal spear and instructs him in the proper use of the weapon. Zhou kindly protests the gift at first, but allows Yue to keep it out of friendship.

A second graphic novelization drastically changes the storyline involving Zhou. Like the original, Zhou becomes the tutor of the Wang estate, but, when news of his arrival prompts rich families to send their sons to learn from him, he is forced to accept droves of these students on a trial basis. He eventually chooses his friends' sons as his indoor disciples and Yue as his "godchild". Years later, he takes his now teenage students not to see the Buddhist abbot, but to teach them military strategy out in the mountain wilderness. Yue senses trouble after his martial brothers separate to explore the forest and rushes off to rescue them, only to be confronted by a monstrous snake. After vanquishing the beast with his sword, Yue discovers a magic glowing spear within a cave and reports back to Zhou. Following their training, Zhou becomes ill from overexposure to the cold mountain air on the return trip home and dies soon after. Instead of just Yue, all of his students live beside his grave for a mourning period of one hundred days before returning home to their families. These events take place three years before Zhou originally died in The Story of Yue Fei.

Stories including Zhou have also been used to educate. The secondary school system of Hong Kong teaches children the value of mentorship by making them read about the close teacher-pupil relationship between Zhou and Yue. A morale tale called "Yue Fei Studies Archery" in Children's Pictorial, a Chinese magazine tailored for children ages two through seven, demonstrates how great achievements are only made possible via diligent practice. The story states how young Yue stumbles upon Zhou's training hall in a neighboring town while gathering fire wood. Yue applies to become a student, but Zhou tells him he must first practice the art of the "far-sighted person" by staring into the morning sun to improve his eyesight. After years of unrelenting practice, Yue is able to spot a lone goose flying off in the distance and two cicadas on a tree far into the forest. Zhou then officially takes him as his disciple and adopted son. Under his tutelage, Yue is able to master the eighteen weapons of war and to shoot a falling leaf from one hundred paces away.

He is mentioned numerous times in author Robert Liparulo's thriller Deadlock (2009). Zhou is first featured in chapter eight during a conversation between the main character John "Hutch" Hutchinson, a journalist bent on stopping the maniacal plans of a billionaire madman, and his friend's young son Dillon, an archery enthusiast. When Hutch asks him if he had ever heard of the archery-champion-turned-actor Howard Hill, Dillon replies: "I don't think so ... You told me about Zhou Tong". Hutch then says: "Oh, yeah. Zhou Tong was something. Taught the Song dynasty to be the best military archers in history. But Howard Hill [was the best]". Later in chapter fifty, while Hutch is trailing a killer through an airport, a page goes out over the intercom system for a "Mr. Zhou Tong". When the page goes out again, Hutch muses: "Zhou Tong had been a famous archery teacher and military arts tutor in the Song dynasty. [Dillon and I] had long telephone conversations about him, because of Tong's blending of archery skills and self-discipline. He was an inspiration to [me]. Dillon had sensed that and wanted to known everything about him". He finally realizes that the page had to have been left by Dillon's mother Laura to catch his attention. The page is sent to warn him of a trap, but Hutch receives it too late.

Screen actors who have portrayed Zhou in films from the 1940s and 1960s include Wong Sau Nin, Li Ming, and Jing Ci Bo. Jing starred alongside a ten-year-old Sammo Hung, who played young Yue Fei. Veteran martial arts actor Yu Chenghui, who played the sword-wielding antagonist in Jet Li's Shaolin Temple, stated in a 2005 newspaper interview that he never shaved his trademark beard, even at the request of movie producers, because he wanted to portray Zhou in a future film. He went on to say "He is an outstandingly able person from the northern and southern Song dynasties and many Water Margin heroes are his disciples. This person is very important in the martial arts and many people want to portray him in films".

== See also ==
- List of archers
- Man Jiang Hong
