= Yuejiaquan =

Martial arts of the Song Dynasty

Yuejiaquan 岳家拳
- Also known as: Yue family Fist/Boxing
- Focus: Striking, Chin Na, weapons training
- Country of origin: China
- Creator: Yue Fei (attributed)
- Famous practitioners: Ng Mui
- Parenthood: Eagle Claw, Chin Na
- Descendant arts: Xingyiquan

Yuejiaquan (岳家拳, literally Yue Family Fist, alternately Yue Ch'uan) is a style of Chinese martial arts attributed to Yue Fei, a noted general and patriot from the Song dynasty.

== History and philosophy ==
Legend claims Yue taught the style to his soldiers who passed it down for generations after his death. It contains mostly military-oriented attacks, and is based primarily upon the principles of combining internal and external techniques, theory and application. Its various tricks stem from its principal philosophy of the positive and negative and the five elements of the heart, liver, lung, spleen and kidney in the human body. This art created by Yue Fei includes Eagle Claw Chin Na submissions and other fighting techniques that would later become the basis of the creation of xingyiquan.

== In popular culture ==
The style is mentioned towards the end of Yue Fei's highly popular folklore biography The Story of Yue Fei published in 1684. In the novel, Yue Lei, Yue's second son, uses the style in a brawl against the martial instructor of a group of bandits who forcefully took over residence of a local Taoist temple to Lord Guan. During the fight, "The instructor went forward one step to catch up with Yue Lei. Yue Lei turned around and used his right hand to push away his opponent's two hands whilst using his left hand to give a push on the chest. The instructor was startled and quickly dodged the blow, shouting, 'Stay your hands! This is the Yue Family's Pugilistic Fight. Where did you learn this from? I beg for your name!'" After Yue learns the instructor is Zhong Liang, the grandson of the famous Song General Zhong Ze, Zhong muses: "My family and the Yue family have been friends for three generations. Commander Yue had often discussed pugilistic skills with my father [Zhong Fang], so I could recognize your move as 'The Black Tiger's Theft of the Heart,' which comes from the Yue Family."
