= General Yue Fei =

1684 novel by Qian Cai

- Cover of an 1864 edition of General Yue Fei, volume one
- Author: Qian Cai
- Translator: T.L. Yang
- Language: Written Chinese
- Genre: Historical fiction
- Set in: 12th century
- Publication date: 1684, 1744
- Publication place: Qing dynasty
- Media type: Print

Cover of an English translated edition of General Yue Fei

General Yue Fei (Chinese: 說岳全傳) is a Chinese historical novel written by Qian Cai in the Qing dynasty. Consisting of 80 chapters, the first 61 chapters detail the life and adventures of Yue Fei, while the last 19 concern the exploits of Yue Fei's son Yue Lei after Yue Fei's unjust death.

== Description ==
The author Qian Cai (錢彩) lived sometime during the reigns of the Kangxi and Yongzheng (1661–1735) emperors of the Qing dynasty. A dating symbol in its preface points either to the year 1684 or to 1744. It was banned during the reign of the Qianlong Emperor. There are two main versions of this novel. The original one had 80 chapters. There was an illustrated edition of this version published in 1912. The other version also had 80 chapters and was published during the reign of the Tongzhi Emperor (1861–1875).

Some people mistakenly take this novel to be historical fact when it is purely fiction. According to Sir Yang Ti-liang's introduction to his translation:

The work is a historical novel in form, but it is in fact based almost mainly on legends which were current amongst the common people for centuries. Indeed some of the events described there are nothing more than Qian Cai's own imagination.

== English translation ==
Starting in 1964 and finishing in 1995, Sir Yang Ti-liang, former Chief Justice of Hong Kong, current Chairman of the Hong Kong Red Cross, combined the first chapters of these works (in an attempt to weed out the overabundance of supernatural elements) to create a 79-chapter version with 961 pages, which he translated into English. It was published by Joint Publishing in 1995.

== Major characters ==
=== Protagonists ===
- Yue Fei and his family
  - Yue Yun, Yue Fei's first son
  - Yue Lei, Yue Fei's second son
- Zhang Xian
- Niu Gao
- Yang Zaixing
- Gao Chong
- Lu Wenlong
- Wang Zuo
- Zhou Tong
- Huyan Zhuo
- Han Shizhong
- Liang Hongyu
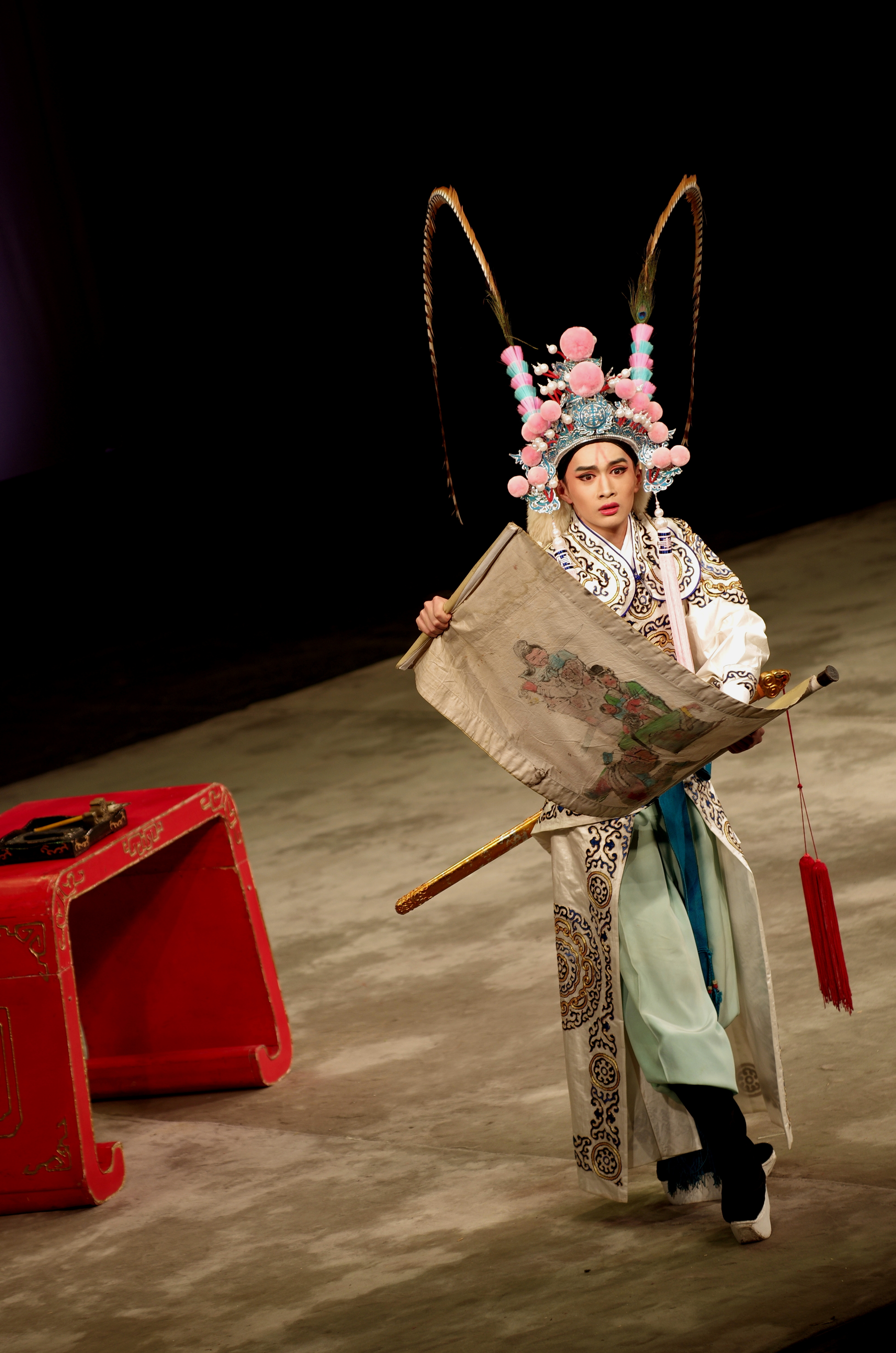
Lu Wenlong in Yue opera

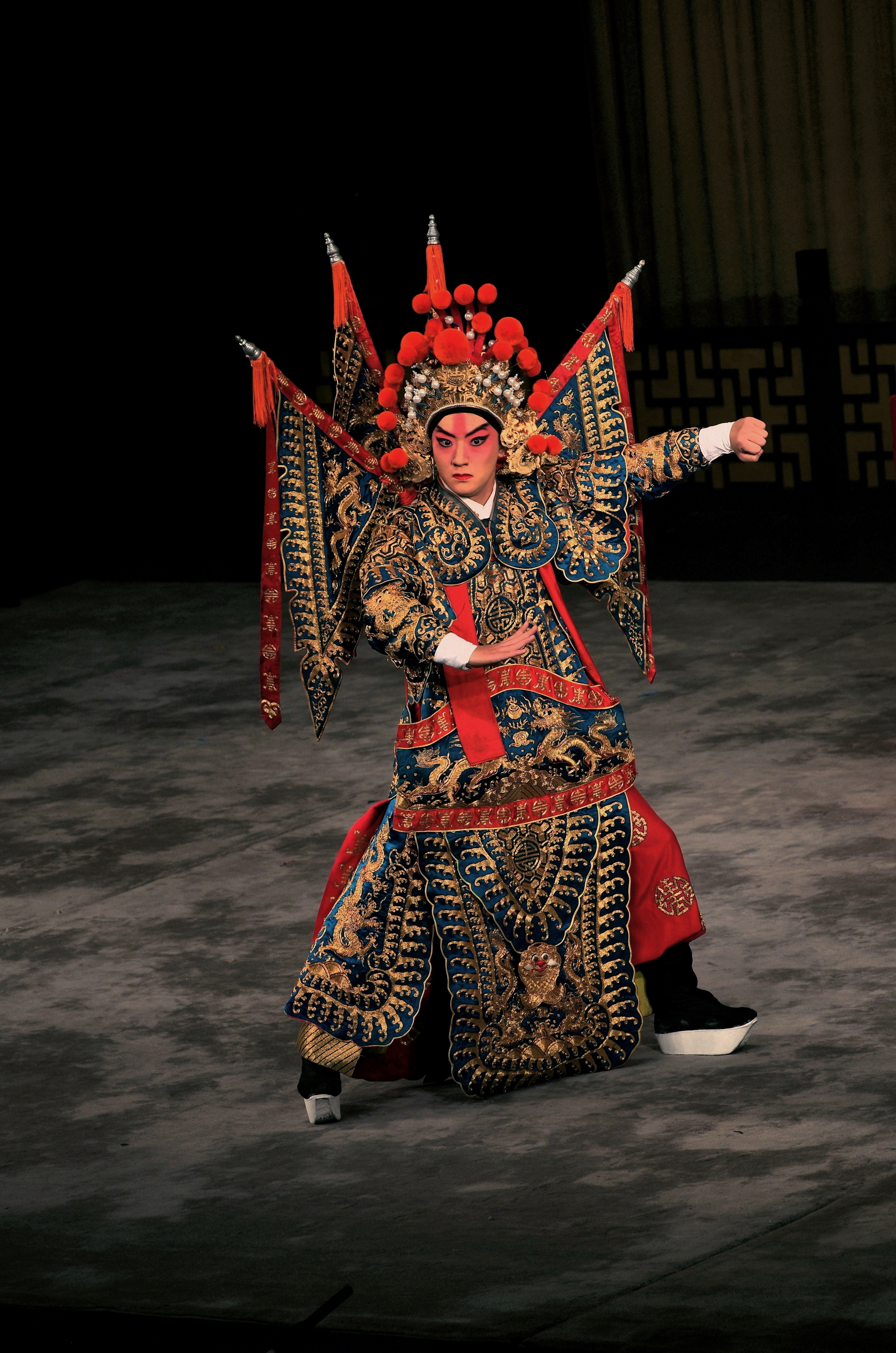
Gao Chong in Peking opera

=== Antagonists ===
- Qin Hui and his wife
- Wuzhu
- Hamichi, Wuzhu's strategist
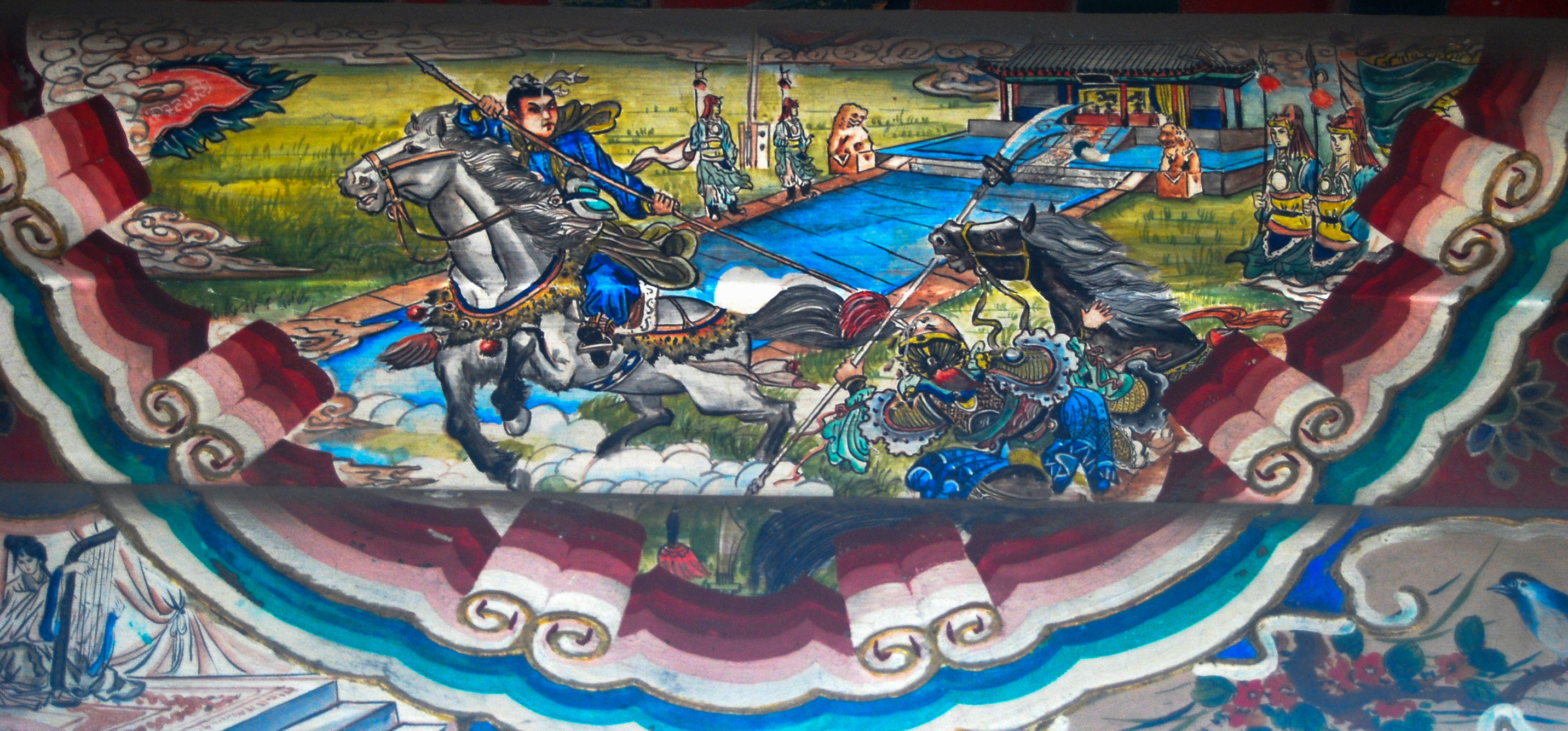
Yue Fei kills the Little Prince of Liang

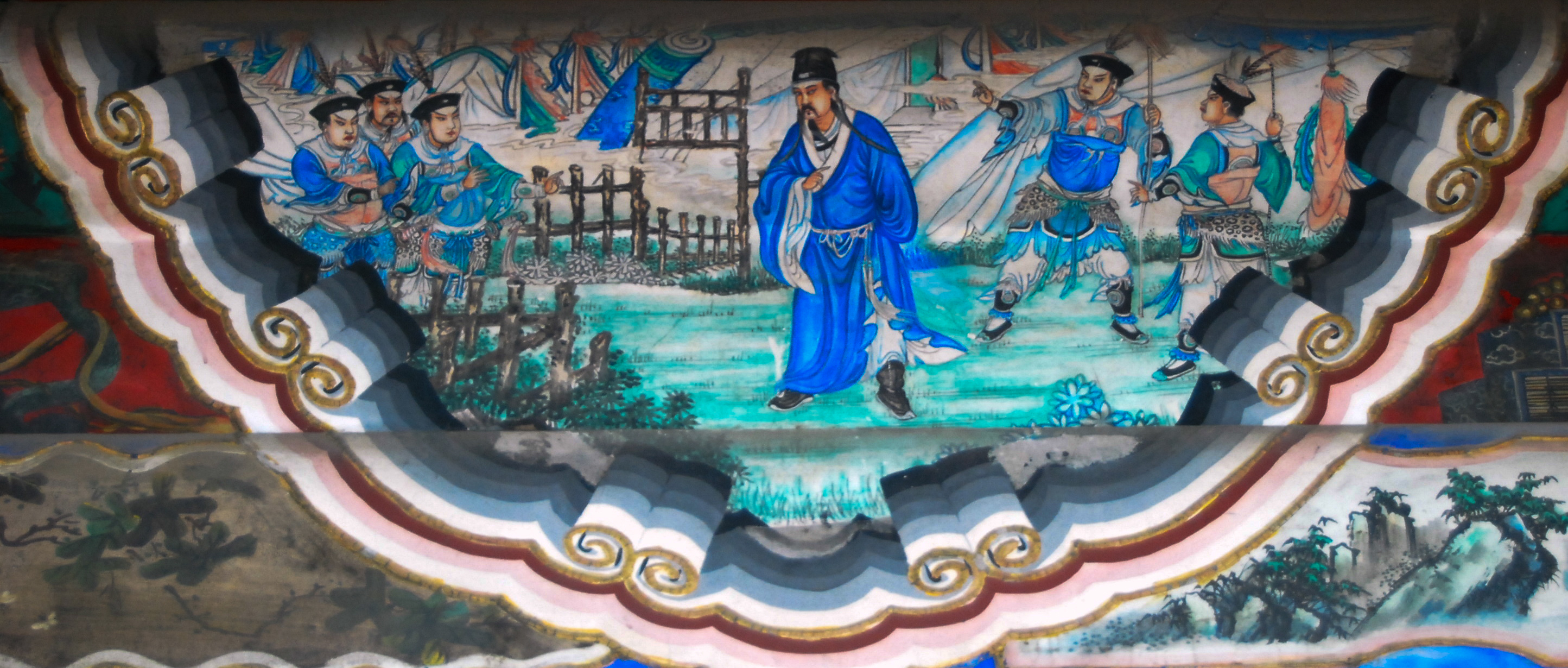
Wang Zuo "surrenders" to Jin
