= Northern Praying Mantis =

Chinese martial art

Tang Lang 螳螂拳
- Also known as: Tong^{4} Long^{4} Tōrō-ken (Note: Japanese translation of the Chinese name.)
- Focus: Striking, Grappling
- Country of origin: China
- Creator: Wang Lang (王朗)
- Parenthood: see Origins section

Northern Praying Mantis (Chinese: 螳螂拳; pinyin: tánglángquán; lit. 'praying mantis fist') is a style of Chinese martial arts, sometimes called Shandong Praying Mantis after its province of origin. It is one of the best known styles of "Northern" kung fu and it encompasses of many styles, with the three main ones being the six-harmony style, eight-steps style and seven-star style.

According to common folk stories, it was created by Wang Lang (王朗) and was named after the praying mantis, an insect, the aggressiveness of which inspired the style. One version of the myth places the creation of the style during the Song dynasty when Wang Lang was supposedly one of 18 masters gathered by the Abbot Fu Ju (福居), a legendary persona of the historical Abbot Fu Yu (福裕; 1203–1275), to improve Shaolin martial arts. However, most legends place Wang Lang in the late Ming dynasty, or early Qing dynasty circa 1650.

== Features ==
Comparison of a technical drawing of a mantis arm and the "mantis hook" hand posture.

The mantis is a long and narrow predatory insect. While heavily armoured, it is not built to withstand forces from perpendicular directions. Consequently, its fighting style involves the use of whip-like/circular motions to deflect direct attacks, which it follows up with precise attacks to the opponent's vital spots. These traits have been subsumed into the Northern Praying Mantis style, under the rubric of "removing something" (blocking to create a gap) and "adding something" (rapid attack).

One of the most distinctive features of Northern Praying Mantis is the "praying mantis hook" (Chinese: 螳螂勾; pinyin: tángláng gōu): a hook made of one to three fingers directing force in a whip-like manner. The hook may be used to divert force (blocking), hook onto and adhere to an opponent's limb, such as in clinching, or to strike with the back of the wrist.

Northern Praying Mantis is especially known for its speed and continuous attacks. Wrist/arm techniques in particular are emphasized, as well as knee and elbow strikes. Another prominent feature of the style is its complex footwork, borrowed from Monkey Kung Fu.

The core of the Mantis system is made up of the following forms: Beng Bu, Luan Jie, Fen Shen Ba Zhou, Quan Zhong Zhai Yao and Fan Che.

According to the writings of Liang Xuexiang, the original forms of the system, as passed down by Wang Lang, were Luan Jie, Fen Shen Ba Zhou, and the Mi Shou (secret hands, not a form but solo movements). Others have stated that Beng Bu, Luan Jie and Fen Shou Ba Zhou are the original.

Quan Zhong Zhai Yao was created later, and is a compilation of the most important techniques and combinations of the system. A set of seven forms, Zhai Yao is typically regarded as being the result of exchanges between Jiang Hua Long, Li Dan Bai and Song Zi De. Some sources say that Seven Star Mantis founder, Wang Yun Sheng, was also involved in the creation.

== Origins ==
There are many legends surrounding the creation of Northern Praying Mantis boxing. One legend attributes the creation of Mantis fist to the Song dynasty when Abbot Fu Ju (福居), a legendary persona of the historical Abbot Fu Yu (福裕) (1203–1275), supposedly invited Wang Lang (王朗) and seventeen other masters to come and improve the martial arts of Shaolin. The Abbot recorded all of the techniques in a manual called the Mishou (祕手 – "Secret Hands") and later passed it onto the Taoist priest Shen Xiao. This manual supposedly disappeared until the Qianlong reign era when it was published under the name "Arhat exercising merit short strike illustrated manuscript" (Chinese: 罗汉行功短打; pinyin: Luóhàn Xínggōng Duǎn Dǎ). Some sources place the folk manuscript's publication on the "sixteenth day of the third month of the spring of 1794". The manual records Wang Lang "absorbed and equalized all previous techniques" learned from the 17 other masters.

The 18 Masters Invited to Shaolin
#	Name	Technique	Master
1	Changquan	Long Fist Boxing	Emperor Taizu of Song
2	Tongbeiquan	Through the Back	Han Tong
3	Chan Feng	Wrap Around and Seal	Zheng En
4	Duanda	Close-range Strikes	Ma Ji
5	Keshou Tongquan	Knocking Hands and Follow Through Fist	Jin Xiang
6	Gou Lou Cai Shou	Hooking, Grappling and Plucking Hands	Liu Xing
7	Zhanna Diefa	Methods of Sticking, Grabbing, and Falling	Yan Qing
8	Duan Quan	Short Boxing	Wen Yuan
9	Hou Quan	Monkey Boxing	Sun Heng
10	Mien Quan	Cotton Fist	Mien Shen
11	Shuailue Yingbeng	Throwing-Grabbing and Hard Crashing	Gao Huaide
12	Gunlou Guaner	Rolling, Leaking and Piercing the Ears	Tan Fang
13	Chuojiao	Mandarin ducks kicking technique	Lin Chong
14	Qishi Lianquan	Seven Postures of Continuously Linked Strikes	Meng Su
15	Kunlu Zhenru	Hand Binding and Grabbing	Yang Gun
16	Woli Paochui	Explosive Strikes into the Hollow Body Parts	Cui Lian
17	Kao Shen	Leaning Body Techniques	Huang You
18	Tong long	Praying Mantis	Wong Long

A third of the masters listed all come from fictional novels. Yan Qing (#7) and Lin Chong (#13) come from the Water Margin and Emperor Taizu of Song (#1), Han Tong (#2), Zheng En (#3) and Gao Huaide (#11) come from the Fei Long Quan Zhuan (飞龙全传 – "The Complete Flying Dragon Biography"), which was published prior to the aforementioned manual.

Another legend connected to the Song Dynasty states Wang Lang participated in a Lei tai contest in the capital city of Kaifeng and was defeated by General Han Tong (韩通), the founder of Tongbeiquan. After leaving the fighting arena, he saw a brave praying mantis attacking the wheels of oncoming carts with its "broadsword-like" arms, Mantis fist was born shortly thereafter.

Many martial scholars doubt the existence of Wang Lang, and believe that Mantis was an amalgamation of local Shandong styles, such as Long Fist, Groundboxing, Luohan Quan and Shui Kou Men.

=== Connection with General Yue Fei ===
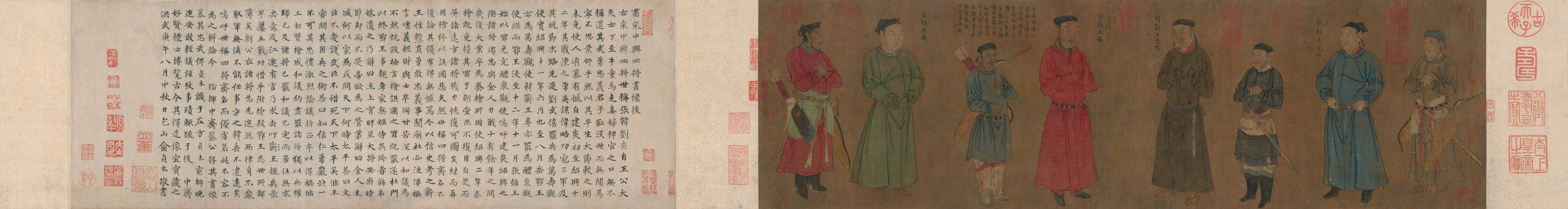
The "Four Generals of the Restoration" painted by Liu Songnian during the Southern Song dynasty. Yue Fei is the second person from the left. It is believed to be the "truest portrait of Yue in all extant materials."

As previously stated, the Water Margin bandits Lin Chong and Yan Qing, the adopted of Lu Junyi, are said to be part of the 18 masters supposedly invited to Shaolin by the legendary Abbot Fuju. According to the folklore biography of Song dynasty General Yue Fei, Lin and Lu were former students of Zhou Tong, the general's military arts teacher. One martial legend states Zhou learned Chuojiao boxing from its originator Deng Liang (邓良) and then passed it onto Yue Fei. Chuojiao is also known as the "Water Margin Outlaw style" and "Mandarin Duck Leg" (Chinese: 鴛鴦腿; pinyin: Yuānyāng Tuǐ). In the Water Margin's twenty-ninth chapter, entitled "Wu Song, Drunk, Beats Jiang the Gate Guard Giant", it mentions Wu Song, another of Zhou's fictional students, using the "Jade Circle-Steps with Duck and Drake feet". Lin Chong is listed above as being a master of "Mandarin ducks kicking technique".

Northern Mantis Lineage Master Yuen Man Kai openly claims Zhou taught Lin and Lu the "same school" of martial arts that was later combined with the seventeen other schools to create the Mantis style. However, he believes Mantis style was created during the Ming dynasty, and was therefore influenced by these eighteen schools from the Song. He also says Lu Junyi taught Yan Qing the same martial arts as he learned from Zhou. Master Yuen further comments Zhou later taught Yue the same school and that Yue was the originator of the mantis move "Black Tiger Steeling [sic] Heart". Note that the various branches of Yue Jia Quan (Yue Family Boxing) do indeed have an analogous postural movement named "Black Tiger Steals the Heart". Also various Yue Jia Quan sets feature a "Preying Mantis Pounces on Prey" claw hand posture as well.

== Styles ==
=== Widespread styles ===
There are several styles of Northern Praying Mantis, the best known of which are:

- Seven Star Praying Mantis Boxing (Chinese: 七星螳螂拳; pinyin: qī xīng tángláng quán) is arguably the most well known and practiced branch of Northern Praying Mantis. In China, it is widely practiced in Liaoning and Shandong Provinces. Today this system is represented by the lineages of Wang Rongsheng (王榮生) and Wang Yunpeng, based on the teachings of Li Sanjian (李三箭). Fan Xudong (范旭東) teaches In the modern era, Luo Guangyu (羅光玉) is known for having passed down this style to Hong Kong, Shanghai and other parts of Southern China via the Jingwu Athletic Association, and by his disciples Chiu Chi Man (趙志民) and Wong Hon Fun (黃漢勛1) the martial tradition has been disseminated internationally through the Chinese Diaspora. Seven Star Mantis combines elements of Hard and Soft methods, Long and Short attacks, internal and external principles. It is considered by many as the 'hardest' of the Praying Mantis styles, but this association is misleading. A common saying, "Hide the hard in the soft," means both Hard and Soft are interwoven together.
- Plum Blossom Praying Mantis Boxing (Chinese: 梅花螳螂拳; pinyin: méihuā tángláng quán). it is widespread in Shandong Province, Jilin, Liaoning and South Korea. Though heavily influenced by the development of Taiji Mantis of Cui Shoushan and Wang Yushan, Taiji Plum Blossom of Hao Family, Taiji Mantis of Zhao Zhuxi and Babu Mantis of Wei Xiaotang in the early 1900s, the art traces its lineage directly from Li Bingxiao (b.1700s) to Zhao Zhu to Liang Xuexiang (1810–1895). Liang Xuexiang (alternately listed as living from 1790-1860) was mentioned prominently by the Korean Branch of the Mei Hua Tang Lang as the "creator of the Plum Flower Branch of Praying Mantis Boxing and was the first master to use the name "Plum Blossom". Liang Xuexiang's disciples, mainly Jiang Hualong, Liang Jingchuan, Sun Yuanchang, Hao Hong and Xiu Kunshan are responsible for popularization of this style in the 20th century while Lin Ping Jiang, an emigre of the 1940s is known to have come from Shantong province to teach Praying Mantis in the area of Seoul, Korea.
- Taiji Praying Mantis Boxing (Chinese: 太極螳螂拳; pinyin: tàijí tángláng quán). Today this style is represented by two distinct lineages. The first one is that of Cui Shoushan and Wang Yushan and is based on Song Zide and Jiang Hualong's Plum Blossom teachings in Laiyang, Shandong Province. It is popular in Laiyang, Yantai, Qingdao, Dalian, North America, Russia, France and Spain. The second lineage can be traced to Sun Yuanchang's Plum Blossom, who was yet another disciple of Liang Xuexiang. Its best known progenitor is Zhao Zhuxi, who is said to have taught (both directly and indirectly) thousands of students during his lifetime in Vietnam and Hong Kong, who have since spread to all corners of the globe. He was given the Cantonese nickname "Chuk Kai", meaning "Bamboo Creek", for a famous battle he fought with bandits at that location. This style has since become prevalent in places such as Korea, Hong Kong, Vietnam, and North America.
- Taiji Plum Blossom Praying Mantis Boxing (Chinese: 太極梅花螳螂拳; pinyin: tàijí méihuā tángláng quán). This style is, historically, a combination of two different lineages of Mantis: Taiji Mantis and Plum Blossom Mantis. This style is widespread in Yantai, Qingdao, Beijing, Dalian, Harbin, etc. What is now called Taiji Plum Blossom traces its lineage to Hao Lianru (郝蓮茹)—a disciple of Liang Xuexiang, his sons Hao Henglu, Hao Hengxin and his grandson Hao Bin. The later three combined both Taiji Mantis and Plum Blossom in the early 20th century, creating the current style. Hao Lianru's five sons have since spread the style elsewhere. This style is well known for its large, two-handed sword, and for being somewhat 'softer' than Seven Star Praying Mantis.
- Six Harmony Praying Mantis Boxing (Chinese: 六合螳螂拳; pinyin: liù hé tángláng quán). Known as the 'softest' or most 'internal' of the Praying Mantis styles, Six Harmony was passed down by Ding Zicheng (丁子成), whose students taught in Shandong Province as well as Taiwan. Six Harmony Praying Mantis has a very different curriculum, with unique routines not found in other Praying Mantis styles.
- Eight Step Praying Mantis Boxing (Chinese: 八步螳螂拳; pinyin: bā bù tángláng quán). This style claims to have been originally conceived by Jiang Hualong (姜化龍), and was further refined by his principle disciple of the style, Feng Huanyi (馮環義), which was passed down by his disciple Wei Xiaotang (衛笑堂) in Taiwan. However, Wei Xiaotang is the first verifiable teacher of the style, and it seems most likely that he developed the style himself, either while still in China, or later after he relocated to Taiwan. It is claimed that the style was passed down to his disciple Shyun Guang Long (荀廣龍) (James Shyun), although this claim has been contested. The style is taught in Taiwan by Master Tso Hsien Fu, and was taught abroad by Su Yuchang, both disciples of Wei Xiaotang, amongst others.

== Media ==
Mantis fist is usually the main antagonist's style of choice in various forms of media.

=== Film ===
Northern Praying Mantis is one of the most common martial arts appearing in the movies.

David Chiang learns this style from the Mantis in The Deadly Mantis (1978 film) a.k.a. Shaolin mantis (1978)

The Style is performed in Yuen Siu-tien's starring Dance of the Drunk Mantis (1979)

In The Tricky Master (1999), Stephen Chow's apprentice beats an overweight card sharp in a "fixed" high-stakes poker game. When taunted, the card sharp jumps onto the playing table and defeats Chow's deaf, cross-dressing bodyguard with a "long lost kung fu" called "Fat Mantis", which is the "most powerful...and kills without blood." In the end, Stephen Chow sprays the card sharp with a can of insecticide. He falls to the ground dead with his hands and legs held into the air like a bug.

In The Forbidden Kingdom (2008), the "Silent Monk" (Jet Li) employs mantis fist in his battle over the Monkey King's magical staff with Lu Yan, the "Drunken Immortal" (Jackie Chan). But his Mantis boxing is shortly thereafter overpowered by Lu's Tiger boxing. The movie's screenwriter, John Fusco, is a long-time student of Northern Praying Mantis and worked closely with Jet Li during production.

In the animated movie Kung Fu Panda, one of the six kung fu students is an actual praying mantis who uses Northern Praying Mantis kung fu.

=== Television ===
In Hung Hei-Gun: Decisive Battle With Praying Mantis Fists (洪熙官: 决战螳螂拳) (a.k.a. The Kung Fu Master, 1994), Donnie Yen plays the titular role of legendary martial arts hero Hung Hei-Gun. After being beaten up as a Child, Hung's parents send him away to study Kung Fu. He returns eight years later to find his father (who is secretly an anti-Manchu rebel leader) working as the military arms instructor for the Qing government, much to the chagrin of the local villagers. Despite his years of training, a rakish manchu Prince easily overpowers Hung with the mantis style. After the supposed death of his father, Hung faces the prince once more. When the prince shoots poisonous arrows from his sleeves, Hung twirls his staff to collect the projectiles and then flings them back. The Prince dies from his own poison arrows.

In the 2014 Netflix TV series Marco Polo, Jia Sidao, the main antagonist, portrayed by Chin Han, uses praying mantis kung fu.

=== Books ===
Mantis is about a half-Vietnamese serial killer who murders erotic dancers because he believes his pet praying mantis tells him to do so (which is quite similar the real life case involving the "Son of Sam"). He uses this style of fighting utilizing his fingers to attack the neck veins and the eyes.

=== Video games ===
Lion Rafale, a character from Sega's Virtua Fighter series, uses Praying Mantis style. He was introduced in Virtua Fighter 2. Chai, a recurring villain of the Shenmue series, also uses the style. It is also used by Kung Lao and Shujinko in the Mortal Kombat series. Wulong Goth, the leader of the evil "Black Mantis" sect, employs Praying Mantis in the game Tao Feng: Fist of the Lotus. Gen, from the Street Fighter series of video games, uses this technique, which he can change at will with the Crane style. In the Eternal Champions series, Praying Mantis is used by Larcen Tyler.

== Sources ==
- Ryuchi Matsuda, "Illustrated History of Chinese Martial Arts" - Sojinja Shrine
- Yoshinori Aoki, "Chinese Martial Arts Eight Great Gates Combat Theory" - Airyudo
- Kazumi Nemoto "Summary of Toroken -Comprehensive fist method of both Yin and Yang" Fukushodo
