= Chin Na =

Technique in Chinese martial arts

- Also known as: 擒拿, Qinna
- Focus: Grappling
- Country of origin: China
- Meaning: Capture and hold

Qin Na (Chinese: 擒拿; pinyin: qínná; Wade–Giles: ch'in na) is the set of joint lock techniques used in the Chinese martial arts to control or lock an opponent's joints or muscles/tendons so they cannot move, thus neutralizing the opponent's fighting ability. Qin Na Shu (Chinese: 術; pinyin: shù meaning "technique") literally translates as lock catch technique. Some schools simply use the word na ("hold") to describe the techniques. Qinna features both standing and ground-based grappling techniques.

Some Chinese martial arts instructors focus more on their Qin Na techniques than others. This is one of the many reasons why the qinna of one school may differ from that of another. All martial arts contain qinna techniques in some degree. The southern Chinese martial arts have more developed Qin Na techniques than northern Chinese martial systems. The southern martial arts have much more prevalent reliance on hand techniques which causes the practitioner to be in closer range to their opponent. There are over 700 Qin Na traditional techniques found in all martial arts. Along with Fujian White Crane, styles such as Northern Eagle Claw (Ying Jow Pai) and Tiger Claw (Fu Jow Pai) have qinna as their major martial focus and tend to rely on these advanced techniques.

There is no universally accepted systemized form of Qin Na. Instead, each school varies depending on the instructor's training and/or personal preference of focus.

== Techniques ==
While techniques of qinna are trained to some degree by most martial arts worldwide, many Chinese martial arts are famous for their specialization in such applications. Styles such as Eagle Claw (Yīng zhua quán 鹰爪拳), which includes 108 qinna techniques, Praying Mantis (Tánglángquán 螳螂拳), the Tiger Claw techniques of Hung Gar (洪家), and Shuai Jiao are well known examples.

Qinna can generally be categorized (in Chinese) as:

1. "Fen jin" or "zhua jin" (dividing the muscle/tendon, grabbing the muscle/tendon). Fen means "to divide", zhua is "to grab" and jin means "tendon, muscle, sinew". They refer to techniques which tear apart an opponent's muscles or tendons.
2. "Cuo gu" (misplacing the bone). Cuo means "wrong, disorder" and gu means "bone". Cuo gu therefore refer to techniques which put bones in wrong positions and is usually applied specifically to joints.
3. "Bi qi" (sealing the breath). Bi means "to close, seal or shut" and qi, or more specifically kong qi, meaning "air". "Bi qi" is the technique of preventing the opponent from inhaling. This differs from mere strangulation in that it may be applied not only to the windpipe directly but also to muscles surrounding the lungs, supposedly to shock the system into a contraction which impairs breathing.
4. "Dian mai" or "dian xue" (sealing the vein/artery or acupressure cavity). Similar to the Cantonese dim mak, these are the technique of sealing or striking blood vessels and chi points.
5. "Rou dao" or "rou shu dao" (soft techniques) which generally refers to the techniques deemed safe for sparring and/or training purposes.

Qin means to capture or lock, na means to grab or hold, and while those actions are very often executed in that order, the actions can be performed distinctly in training and self-defense: a trap isn't always followed by a lock or break, and a lock or break is not necessarily set up by a trap.

There is quite a bit of overlap between qinna theory and technique with the branches of Traditional Chinese Medicine known as tui na (推拏) as well as the use of offensive and defensive qigong as an adjunct of qinna training in some styles.

== See also ==
- Fu Jow Pai
- Nam Pai Tong Long
- Shuai Jiao
- Tanglangquan
- Ying Jow Pai
- Jujutsu
- Judo
- Aikido
