= Chuojiao =

Chinese martial art

Chuojiao 戳腳
- Also known as: Poking foot
- Focus: Striking
- Country of origin: China
- Creator: Deng Liang
- Famous practitioners: Zhou Tong (archer); Yue Fei; Zhao Canyi; Wu Binlou
- Olympic sport: No

Chuojiao (Chinese: 戳腳; pinyin: Chuōjiǎo; lit. 'poking foot') is a Chinese martial art that comprises many jumps, kicks, and fast fist sequences. The fist and feet work in unison and strike continuously forward, like "falling meteorites", never giving the opponent a moment to recover. The qinggong portion of this style's training involves a practitioner jumping against a wall with heavy weights affixed to his/her calves. This style is practiced mainly in northern and northeast China, including central Hebei, Beijing, and Liaoning.

== History ==
Chuojiao originated in the Northern Song dynasty (960–1127) and became popular during the Ming and Qing dynasties (1368–1911). The source from Wu Binlou, a famous Chuojiao expert and founder of Beijing style, believed Chuojiao comes from the Wen Family Boxing style of the Song dynasty (960–1279).

Chuojiao is attributed to Deng Liang, who is said to have created the style on the basis of the 18 basic feet plays. He developed the basics according to calculations of the Chinese abacus to form a chain of feet plays incorporating 108 tricks. According to legend, he later taught the monk Zhou Tong the style, who later passed it on to his pupil General Yue Fei.

Some of the outlaws who appear in the famous novel The Water Margin, such as Wu Song, were experts in this style; this is why Chuojiao was alternately known as the "Water Margin Outlaw style". It is also known as Yuanyang Tui (鴛鴦腿) or "Mandarin Duck Leg." In The Water Margin's 28th chapter, "Drunken Wu Song beats Jiang Menshen innkeeper", it mentions that Wu Song uses the following moves: "step of nephrite ring, leg of mandarin duck".

Feng Keshan (冯克善), a general in the failed Taiping Rebellion of the early 19th century, was a Chuojiao Fanzi master. After the failure of the rebellion, Feng went into seclusion with two other experts Tang Youyi in Hebei Province in Raoyang, where he taught Fanzi, which emphasizes the hands, to the Wang family and Chuojiao, which emphasizes the feet, to the Duan family. During practice, the families would exchange techniques.

== Styles ==
After Master Zhao Canyi (赵灿益), Chuojiao has evolved into many branches such as those below:

Liu Family Chuojiao: Spread throughout Li County, so much so that a large proportion of the county can practice some aspects of Chuojiao even until today. Liu Guanlan taught third generation Guo Gexi, Liu Songlin, Liu Zhenguo, Li Gepu and Liu Zhenjiang. Liu Family Chuojiao is representative of Lixian Chuojiao or Hebei Chuojiao. Current Representatives include Zhang Shuanglong, Wang Zhiyi, Zhang Xiaowang, Liu Zhenmin, Liu Xuehui and Cui Linsheng.

Duan Family Chuojiao: The Duan brothers taught in Raoyang the following third generation: Liu Laowang, Li Timing, Jia Laokai, Zhang Laoxiao, and others. This style is typically known as Raoyang Chuojiao. Current representatives of Raoyang Chuojiao include Li Jiantao, Song Qingbo, Ma Yongchao, Li Juncai, Li Zhenguo and Li Jiankuan.

Wang Family Chuojiao: Wang Zhanao who studied with his father Wang Zhiguo and Zhao Canyi, taught Zhang Jingtian, Wang Zhongli who then taught others. Additionally he taught Xu Zhaoxiong who then took the style to Dongbei.

Zhao Family Chuojiao: Zhao Yiguan taught in the Gaoyang and Baoding areas including Zhao Zhenben, Zhao Laoxian, Chen Yuanhu, Zhou Yuxiang and others. Noting that this style had consolidated influences in earlier generations via Wang Zhiguo and in latter generations from Raoyang (Li Timing) and Lixian (Liu Zhenjiang). This style was commonly referred to as Gaoyang Chuojiao. Some of the Current representatives of Zhao Family Chuojiao include Zhao Haowei and Wu Chanlong (Nephy Perez).

Wei Family Chuojiao: Wei Changyi taught many including the sharing with Xingyi practitioners, but his main disciple was Wei Zankui who in turn taught the famous Beijing Chuojiao/Fanzi master Wu Binlou. Additionally Wei Laofang taught Chuojiao in Li county and his disciples spread the art in Zhangjiakou and western regions of China such as Gansu province. Some branches are also known as Lixian Chuojiao. Some of the current representatives of Beijing Chuojiao/Fanzi tradition include Hong Zhitian and Liu Xuebo. Current Representative of the Wei Laofang school includes Sun Deyu and Kang Yiwu.

Yin Family Chuojiao: Yin Chun Zhang taught his son Yin Ruyan, who in turn taught Yin Xuelang. Yin Xuelang had held the skills within the family until the late 20th century when he taught Liu Renyi and Zhang Hong, the current masters and propagators of this family's Chuojiao. This style is also referred to as "Gu Zhizi".

Later branches derived from the original ones above include:

Zhang Family Chuojiao: Zhang Jing Tian, was a disciple of Master Wang Zhi Guo. He passed his skills to Zhang Heng Qing, nicknamed "Iron Leg Zhang Heng Qing" taught Chuojiao in Yangzhou to Wang Qing Fu, He Yu Shan, Tian Chun and others.

Gao Family Chuojiao: In Shenyang a master from Li county by the name of Gao Bai Quan passed on a Chuo jiao style named "Di Gong Chuo Jiao" (Ground Skill Chuo Jiao). Master Gao was born in Li county and commenced the practice of Chuo Jiao at the age of 11 under master Wang Yong Cen (a disciple of Wei Lao Fang who studied with Zhao Can Yi).

Xu Family Chuojiao: Xu Zhaoxiong, was a student of Wang Zhanao (Son of Wang Zhiguo and disciple of Zhao Canyi). Master Xu brought his Chuojiao and propagated the art in Dongbei areas (Liaoning etc.). This is also known as Dongbei Chuojiao.

Hu Family Chuojiao: Hu Feng San, nicknamed "Hua Qiang Hu" (Flower Spear Hu) for his command of the spear, was a master of other martial arts (Shaolin, Xingyi etc.) prior to studying with the Duan brothers in Raoyang. He taught sequences of Wen Tang Zi (Scholarly Sequences) to students in the city of Shenyang in Liaoning Province, that he was said to have created after studying with the Duan brothers in Rao Yang. It is said that he mastered great Duan family's short kicks. This is also known as Dongbei Chuojiao.

== Techniques ==
The martial routine was the origin of Chuojiao (poking feet boxing). The martial routine in Shenyang later became known as the Hao-style Chuojiao, namely feet poking boxing named after Hao Mingjiu. It features powerful but comfortable moves and its blows are accurate and incorporate a variety of subtle feet tricks. Hands and feet cooperate well for better advantage and longer reach. Its strikes are short but fatal. Hardness is the core of Chuojiao which it combines with suppleness. Its routine consists of nine inter-connected twin feet routines. These routines can be practised either one by one, or linked together. The feet plays call for close cooperation between the feet which is why it is called twin feet play. Another feet poking Chuan is called nine-tumble 18-fall Chuan.

The scholarly routine is a derivative of the martial routine. It is said that during the reign of the Guangxu Emperor (r. 1875–1908) in the Qing dynasty, boxer Hu Fengsan of Shenyang learned of the fame of Chuojiao masters, the Duans in Hebei Province, and traveled 500 kilometers to study with him. After years of hard work, Hu came to understand the secrets of Chuojiao and went back to his native town, where he further developed the art into the scholarly routine, known later as the Hu-style Chuojiao. It is characterized by its exquisite and compact stances and clear-cut, accurate and varied movements. It is also very fast in delivering both fist and feet blows. The scholarly style features such routines as 12-move Chuan, 18-move Chuan, flying swallow Chuan (small flying swallow Chuan), arm Chuan, turning-ring Chuan, jade-ring Chuan, six-method Chuan, two-eight Chuan, two-eight feet plays, 16-move Chuan, 24-move Chuan, 32-move Chuan, soft tumbling Chuan, one-legged 80-move feet plays, one-handed 81-move fist plays, etc.

The martial-scholar tumbling Chuan has combined the strengths of the martial and scholar routines, especially the combative techniques. It is arranged according to the rhythms of offence and defence of the martial arts and combines high-low, release-catch, extension-flexion and straight-rounded movements. Its tricks, combinations of motions, still exercises, hardness, suppleness, substantial and insubstantial moves are well planned and accurate. New tricks include ground skill feet poking, feet poking tumbles, Shaolin feet poking, leg flicking feet poking, free-mind feet poking, eight-diagram feet poking, etc. All these have their own styles, forms, rhythms and techniques.

== See also ==
- Fanzi
- Changquan
- Eagle Claw
- Taekkyon
