= Eagle Claw =

Chinese martial art

Eagle Claw Ying Zhao
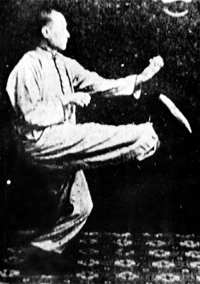
- Chan Tzi Ching performing a technique
- Also known as: Eagle Claw, Eagle Fist, Eagle Hand, Ying Kuen, Ying Quan, Ying Sao, Ying Shou
- Focus: Chin Na, Pressure point Striking, Grappling, Joint lock
- Country of origin: China
- Creator: Yue Fei (attributed)
- Famous practitioners: Lai Chin; Liu Shi Jun; Liu Cheng You; Chan Tzi Ching / Chen Zizheng; Lau Kai Man; Chian Jin Man; Cynthia Rothrock
- Parenthood: Shaolin kung fu (credited), Chin Na, (later combined by Lai Chin)
- Descendant arts: Yuejiaquan, Xingyiquan
- Olympic sport: No

Eagle Claw 鷹爪派 (; pinyin: yīng zhǎo ; eagle claw school) is a style of Chinese martial arts known for its gripping techniques, system of joint locks, takedowns, and pressure point strikes, which is representative of Chinese grappling known as Chin Na. The style is normally attributed to the famous patriotic Song dynasty General Yue Fei. Popular legends states that he learned martial arts from a Wudang Monk named Zhou Tong and later created Eagle Claw to help his armies combat the invading armies of the Jin dynasty. It was passed down until the Ming dynasty. Thus, the style took on long range strikes and aerial jumps. During the Qing dynasty, the military instructor Liu Shi Jun became known as the modern progenitor of Eagle Claw and taught many students. His student Liu Cheng You later taught Chen Zizheng who was invited to teach the style in the prestigious Chin Woo Athletic Association during the Republican era. The style spread as Chin Woo opened sister schools in other provinces. Today, it is practiced around the world.

== History ==
While the details of the history alter according to the teller, with names and places shifting as they tend to do in any oral history, in essence the story of Eagle Claw began in the Shaolin Temple and in Chinese military training, became a family tradition passed on from parent to child for generations and eventually shed its air of secrecy with the advent of public martial arts schools.

=== Yue Fei ===
The creation of the Eagle Claw method is normally attributed to General Yue Fei, who lived at a time of conflict between the Southern Song dynasty and the Jurchen tribes of the Jin dynasty. Despite being literate, young Yue Fei chose the military path because there had never been any tradition of full-fledged Confucian civil service in his family history. However, the Yue family was much too poor to afford military lessons for their son, so the boy's maternal grandfather Yao Dewang hired Chen Guang to teach the eleven-year-old how to wield the Chinese spear. Then a local knight errant named Zhou Tong was brought in to continue Yue's military training in archery after he had quickly mastered the spear by the age of thirteen.

None of Yue Fei's biographies mention him learning boxing as a child, but martial researcher Stanley Henning states "[Yue] almost certainly did practice some form of bare handed fighting as a basic foundation for use of weapons." However, he does not venture to guess if either of his teachers or someone else taught him boxing. Despite this, many modern day martial arts masters have assigned Zhou Tong this position. For instance, the internalist Yang Jwingming claims Zhou was a scholar who trained at the famed Shaolin temple and later taught Yue other skills beyond archery, such as various forms of internal and external martial arts. Yang believes this later led to Yue's creation of Eagle Claw and xingyi, another style associated with the general. The history that Yang presents does not mention the spearplayer Chen Guang and erroneously casts Zhou as Yue's only teacher. Eagle Claw proponent Leung Shum does this as well and goes so far as to claim Zhou was a full-fledged Shaolin monk who trained Yue Fei inside of the temple itself. Leung believes Zhou taught him "Elephant Style" which the general later expanded to create the "'108 Locking Hands Techniques' or Ying Sao (Eagle Hand)." There is no evidence that Zhou was ever associated with the Shaolin Temple, though. **There is no verifiable source in China that confirms the suggested Elephant style existing**

The general's biographies are also silent about him creating any styles of his own. The historian Meir Shahar notes Yue's mention in the second preface of the Sinew-Changing Classic (1624) is what "spurred a wave of allusions to the patriotic hero in later military literature". He continues, "By the eighteenth century, Yue Fei had been credited with the inventions of xingyiquan, and by the nineteenth century the 'Eight Section Brocade' and weapon techniques were attributed to him as well." The Ten Compilations on Cultivating Perfection (c. 1300) assigns the creation of the Eight Section Brocade to two of the Eight Immortals, namely Zhongli Quan and Lü Dongbin.

==== Shape-Mimicking Fist ====
In Chinese, xiang means "shape, form, or appearance". Xiang Xing Quan literally means "Imitation Boxing" or "Shape-Mimicking Fist". It is a fighting technique which emphasizes the imitation of the offensive and defensive actions of a certain animal characteristic or celestial personage. In the relevance of the Ying Zhao Fan Tzi system the Xiang refers to moving or movement within the walking fist routine Xiang Xing Quan Shi Lu

Xiang Xing Quan is an umbrella term for any martial arts that mimics characteristic/ forms/ movement/ action from anything other than human, and there are more than one school of kungfu practicing imitation boxing. Example of the animal style: Dragon, Tiger, Panther, Snake, Crane style (that falls under Hung Gar) Eagle Style Chin Na, horse, Mantis Boxing and so on.

=== Shaolin ===
According to legend, in the late Ming dynasty Yue Fei's material is said to have made a re-appearance at one of the sister schools of the Shaolin temple. Lai Chin/Liquan Seng, an expert in the Bashanfan boxing method, encountered soldiers practicing the hand techniques that was called Yue Shi San Shou. After taking the time to learn and master these skills he undertook the daunting task of assimilating them into his pre-existing Fanziquan sets. Some earlier exponents nicknamed it "Ying Quan/Eagle Fist" due to the numerous grabbing skills present.

=== Qing dynasty ===
In 1644 the Ming dynasty was overthrown and replaced by the Qing dynasty. The earliest mention of a traceable lineage of Eagle Claw comes from the Liu Family of Xiong county in Hebei Province China.

=== Liu Shi Jun and Liu Cheng You ===
Liu Shi Jun (1827？-1910) of Xiong County, Baoding City, Hebei is considered the Sijo (founder/ancestor) of the yīng zhǎo fān zi quán. He took up martial arts at an early age and studied under several exponents. Around middle age, he learned Yue Shi San Shouand Fanzi from Fa Cheng and Dao Ji Seng. He later was appointed as the military arts instructor for one of the barracks in the capital city of Beijing. He taught the troops fist and spear skills.

Liu Cheng You first learned martial arts from his uncle Liu Dekuan, who had been a student of Liu Shi Jun. He continued his instruction under other prominent martial artist of the region. He later received advanced training under Liu Shi Jun when he retired to his home village. Liu Chen You turned out to be a very strict teacher and only accepted a few students. The main 2 were Liu Qi Wen & Chen Zizheng. From them, the system expanded and became popular when associated with the famous Chin Woo Association.

=== Chin Woo Athletic Association ===
The Chin Woo Athletic Association was fronted by the famed martial artist Huo Yuanjia in Shanghai. Its purpose was the dissemination of not only Martial Arts but sports and other educational systems to the public. The Eagle Claw system remained relatively restricted to the Xiong County, Baoding City in Hebei until Chen Zizheng was invited to teach at the Chin Wu.

After initial success with the first School in Shanghai, Chen went to his training brother Liu Qi Wen to offer his students careers as Martial Arts instructors in the Chin Woo Association. In time, Eagle Claw was being taught in Shanghai, Hong Kong, GuangZhou, Foshan, Singapore, Malaysia etc.

== Training ==
How the Eagle Claw system is taught varies between each teacher's skill and experiences. What is consistent of an Eagle Claw Master is their knowledge of the 3 core Hand sets of the style and the Spear.

- Xíng Quán is known as the "Walking Fist." This set consists of ten to twelve rows of techniques representative of what is today known as Shaolin Fanziquan.
- Lián Quán is known as the "Linking Fist." A very important set consisting of 50 short lines/rows repetitive techniques on both the left side and right side, in that it not only provides the exponent with an encyclopedic base of the various seizing, grappling and joint-locks of qinna, but it also incorporates various Qigong skills as well.
- Yuè Shì Sàn Shǒu (Yue Clan Free Hand) is considered the "heart" of the Eagle Claw system. It is believed to be the original material passed down by the style's legendary founder Yue Fei. This material has 108 different categories of skills/techniques that are trained to a level of perfection with partners. Each sequence is only an example of that category which contains numerous variations and offshoots.
- Qiang The spear is the primary Weapon associated with the Eagle Claw Style.
