= Eighteen Arms of Wushu =

Main weapons in Chinese martial arts

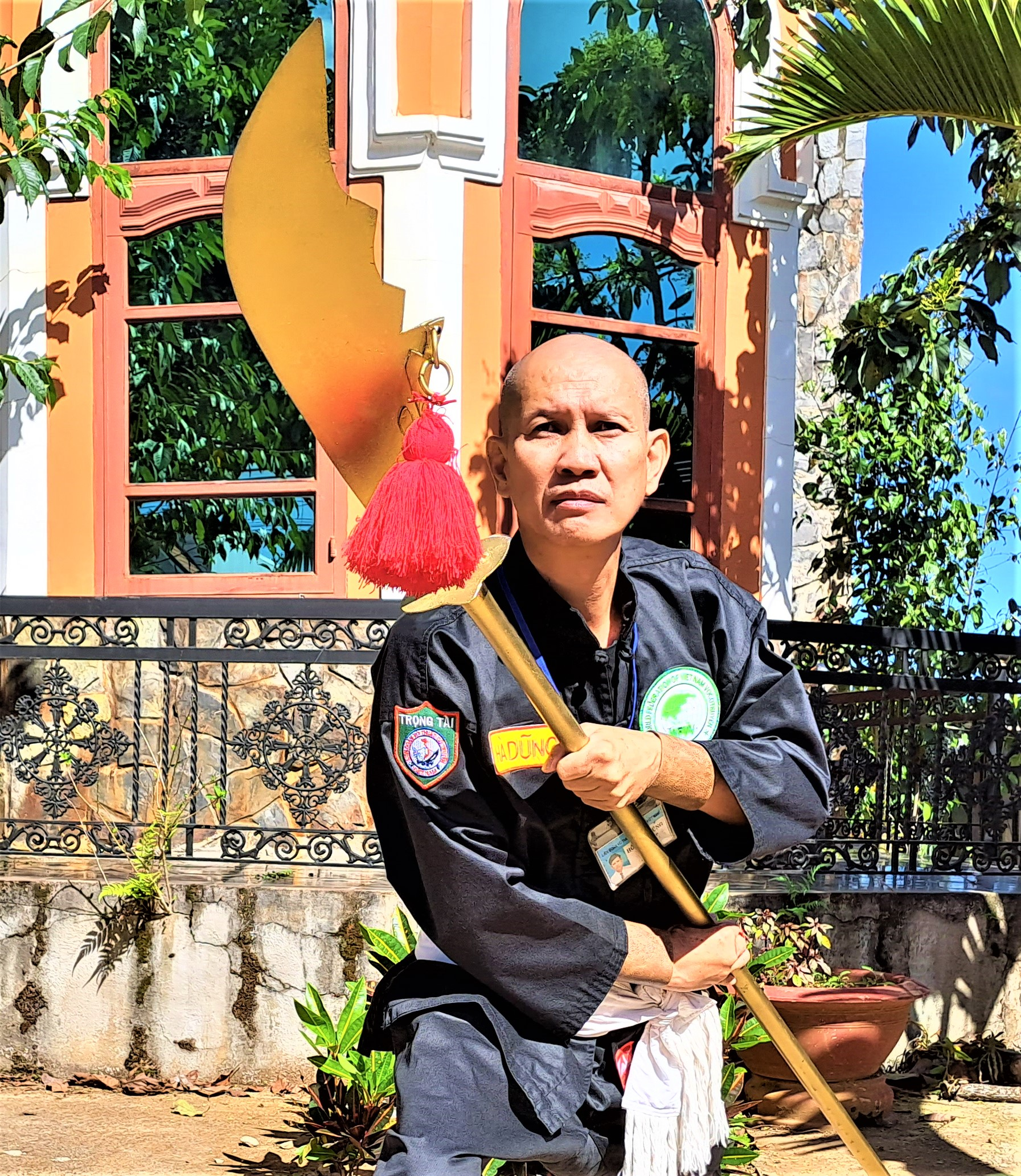
Guandao

The Eighteen Arms is a list of the eighteen main weapons of Chinese martial arts. The origin of the list is unclear and there have been disputes as to what the eighteen weapons actually are.

== See also ==
- Legendary Weapons of China
