= Iron shirt =

Form of hard style martial art exercise

Iron Shirt 鐵衫
- Also known as: Iron Body
- Focus: Striking, Qigong
- Country of origin: China
- Creator: Zhou Tong (monk)
- Famous practitioners: Wu Song
- Parenthood: Unknown
- Descendant arts: Wuzuquan
- Olympic sport: No

Iron Shirt (simplified Chinese: 铁衫; traditional Chinese: 鐵衫; pinyin: tiě shān; Cantonese: tit1 saam3) is a form of hard style martial art exercise believed to help protect the human body from impacts in a fight. This is one of the 72 arts of the Shaolin Temple. Some martial arts are based on the belief that a correctly trained body can withstand more damage than one that is untrained. Iron Shirt is said to be a series of exercises using many post stances, herbs, qigong and body movements to cause the body's natural energy (qi) to reinforce its structural strength. Practitioners believe that directing energy to parts of the body can reinforce these parts of the body to take blows against them. In the Shaolin version of Iron Shirt, the practitioner would do things such as lying on a stump or supporting tablets of granite on the chest with the goal of toughening the body.

== Famous practitioners ==
According to 13th generation lineage Tai He ("Great Harmony") Wudangquan Master Fan Ke Ping (Chinese: 范克平), a collector of rare Kung fu manuals, Zhou Tong, the archery teacher of General Yue Fei, practiced Shènzi bādà Qígōng (Chinese: 肾子八大奇功 - "Testicle Eight Outstanding Techniques"). A book of this style supposedly appeared during the Ming Dynasty and was taught on Wudang Mountain. It became a "hereditary style", taught only to close family members. Other styles include the Hǔ Xiào Jīn Zhōng Zhào (Chinese: 虎啸金钟罩 – “Tiger Shouting Golden Bell Exercise"), Tie Bu Shan ("Five Phoenix Iron Shirt Work") and the Wu Feng Qi Ming Gui Xi Su ("Five Phoenix Combined Shouting Tortoise Resting Method"). Zhou Tong supposedly learned these skills from an “unknown master” and passed it along. During the Ming Dynasty, Daoist Priest Deng Kun Lun (Chinese: 邓坤伦) is fabled to have learned the set and later published a book in 1426 called Dà Sòng Quān Nèi Dì Yī Gāo Shǒu Zhōu Tóng Zhēn Chuán Hǔ Xiào Jīn Zhōng Zhào Fú Qì Liàn Xíng Mì Shù (Chinese: 大宋圈内第一高手周侗真传虎啸金钟罩服气炼形秘术 - “Great Song Circle Internal Sequence First Master Zhou Tong True Line Tiger Shouting Golden Bell Exercise Build Secret Technique”). There is a VCD series about this set of qigong exercises.

A folktale called "Meeting Zhou Tong By Chance" states Zhou Tong was walking down the far side of a tall bridge when he noticed a large young man walking up in his direction while looking down at his own feet. Thinking the young man to be a martial arts master wanting to embarrass Zhou by knocking him off the bridge with a shoulder strike, Zhou prepared for a counter-attack and began to swallow air with a subtle “Hm!” and focused all of his energy to his right shoulder. The skin of his shoulder turned red then purple and became hard as rock underneath his clothing. When the two men brushed shoulders, the young man was nearly knocked off of the bridge and the pain caused saliva to pour from his mouth. The attack left him weak in the knees and one side of his body was completely numb. But the incident was a misunderstanding. The young man was none other than his future student, the Water Margin bandit Wu Song who was looking down at his feet to avoid large water puddles born from a freak rain shower.

== See also ==
- Dim mak
- Iron Palm
