= Chan Kowk-wai =

Chinese martial artist (1936–2022)

Chan Kowk-wai 陳國偉
- Born: Chan Gwok-wai (Chén Guówěi); 3 April 1936; Toisaan, China
- Died: 17 January 2022 (aged 85); São Paulo, Brazil
- Nationality: Chinese
- Style: Northern Shaolin, Yang-style Taiji, Baguazhang, Xingyiquan, Choileifat
- Teachers: Ma Gim-fung (馬劍風), Yim Seung-mou (嚴尚武), Wong Hon-fan (黃漢勳), Jeung Jim-man (張占文), Wàn Làishēng (萬籟聲), Fu Wing-fai (傅永輝), Jan Yiu-chiu (甄耀超)
- Rank: Grandmaster of Northern Shaolin, Yang-style Taiji, Bagua, Xingyi and Hungsing Choy Li Fut

Other information
- Website: Academia Sinobrasileira de Kung Fu e Tai Chi Chuan

Chan Kowk-wai (Chinese: 陳國偉; pinyin: Chén Guówěi; Cantonese Yale: Chan Gwok-wai; 1936-2022) was born on 3 April 1936, in Taishan in the province of Guangdong, China. He introduced traditional Shaolin kung fu to Brazil through the China-Brazil Kung Fu Academy. His disciples have spread as far as the USA, Canada, Spain, Argentina, Chile and the Czech Republic.

In September 2004, Chan was awarded the 10th degree of the World Organization of Wu Shu & Kung Fu Masters at Vancouver, BC, Canada, in five styles: Northern Shaolin, Yang-style Taiji, Baguazhang, Xingyiquan and Hungsing Choileifat.

Chan has authored books, such as Kung Fu Shaolin do Norte - Técnicas Básicas (1995) and Tai Chi Chuan - Estilo Yang Tradicional (2014).

== Kung fu styles ==
Chan taught a broad curriculum of old-school kung fu styles. Most of them are external styles (外家, Wàijiā):

- Northern Shaolin Boxing School (Chinese: 北少林拳門; pinyin: Běi Shàolín Quánmén; Cantonese Yale: Bak Siu-lam Kyun-mun), from the Buddhist Shaolin Monastery of Henan, in Northern China, received from the Yan clan.
- Deep Legs (Chinese: 潭腿 or 彈腿; pinyin: Tán Tuǐ; Cantonese Yale: Taan-teui), from the Islamic Hui people's tradition.
- Fist of (Master) Cha (Chinese: 查拳; pinyin: Zhāquán; Cantonese Yale: Cha-kyun), also from Hui tradition.
- Fist of (Masters) Choi, Lei & Buddha (Chinese: 蔡李佛拳; pinyin: Cài Lǐ Fó Quán; Cantonese Yale: Choi-lei-fat-kyun), including both the original Southern Shaolin Exalted Victory (Chinese: 鴻勝; pinyin: Hóngshèng; Cantonese Yale: Hung-sing) style, and the Northern Victory (Chinese: 北勝; pinyin: Běishèng; Cantonese Yale: Bak-sing) style.
- Seven Stars Praying Mantis Fist (Chinese: 七星螳螂拳; pinyin: Qīxīng Tánglángquán; Cantonese Yale: Chat-sing Tong-long-kyun), where Seven Stars refers to the northern asterism called the Big Dipper.
- Tumbling Eagle Claw (Chinese: 翻子鷹爪; pinyin: Fānzi Yīngzhǎo; Cantonese Yale: Faan-ji Ying-jaau).
- Fist of the Arhat (Chinese: 羅漢拳; pinyin: Lúohànquan; Cantonese Yale: Lo-hon-kyun), from the Buddhist concept of Arhat ("worthy of Nirvana" in Sanskrit).
- Fist of the Six Harmonies (Chinese: 六合拳; pinyin: Liùhéquán; Cantonese Yale: Luk-hap-kyun), a Shaolin style based on leveraging power by synchronizing joints and stances.

The internal styles (内家, Nèijiā) taught by Chan are:

- Yang Clan Fist of the Extreme Polarities (Chinese: 楊氏 太極拳; pinyin: Yángshì Taìjíquán; Cantonese Yale: Yeung-si Taai-gik-kyun), from the Taoist concept of the Taiji or Yin and Yang.
- Fist of the Eight Directions (Chinese: 八極拳; pinyin: Bājíquán; Cantonese Yale: Baat-gik-kyun), from the Chinese concept of Baji, everything within the eight ends (directions or corners) of the world, the Infinity; also from Hui tradition.
- Palm of the Eight Trigrams (Chinese: 八卦掌; pinyin: Bāguàzhǎng; Cantonese Yale: Baat-gwa-jeung), from the Taoist concept of Bagua, the 8 combinations of three proportions of Yin and Yang.
- Fist of Form and Intent (Chinese: 形意拳; pinyin: Xíngyìquán; Cantonese Yale: Ying-yi-kyun).
- Natural School (Chinese: 自然門; pinyin: Zìránmén; Cantonese Yale: Ji-yin-mun).

== Kung fu heritage ==
Chan initiated his kung fu by the age of four with Chan Cheoksing, who taught him Choileifat until he was 14. In 1949, in the context of the Chinese Communist Revolution, Chan moved with his family to Hong Kong, where he trained Shaolin Luohan with his uncle Ma Gimfung (馬劍風).

When Yim Seungmou (嚴尚武) too left the People's Republic of China, he stayed in Hong Kong with Chan's family and taught him Gu Yujeung's Northern Shaolin Style, along with many other systems: Gu's martial qigong (氣功), healing massage techniques, Taijiquan, Xingyiquan, Bajiquan and Tantui; and Baksing Choileifat, which Yim learned directly from its founder Taam Saam, a colleague of Gu. Other students under Yim have also achieved international renown, such as Wong Jack-man and Wing Lam.

Yim Seungmou also introduced the young Chan to reputable teachers of other styles, many from the Chin Woo Athletic Association: Wong Honfan (黃漢勳) of Seven Stars Mantis; Jeung Jimman (張占文) of Eagle Claw; Wan Laisheng (萬籟聲) of Ziranmen and Liuhequan; Fu Wingfai (傅永輝), son of Fu Jansung, of Baguazhang; and Doctor Yan Yiuchiu (甄耀超) of Hungsing Choileifat, with whom he learned everything he could for roughly ten years. Aforementioned masters Gu Yujeung, Fu Jansung, and Wan Laisheng, alongside Li Xianwu (李先五) and Wan's cousin Wan Laiping, are renowned by being sent by the Central Guoshu Institute of Nanjing to teach northern styles to the South, specifically Guangzhou, around 1929, where their prowess's reputation earned them the nickname "Five Northern Tigers".

In 1960, Chan moved to Brazil, where he co-founded the Chinese Social Center (Portuguese: Centro Social Chinês), where he taught kung fu classes for twelve years. He also taught classes at the renowned Universidade de São Paulo (USP) for seven years. In 1973, Chan founded the Academia Sino-Brasileira de Kung-Fu, for which he is largely known today; this school remains active today, managed by his family, and has trained hundreds of students and dozens of teachers.

The heritage tree given below details the main characters of all kung fu styles taught by Chan. Many of these characters are renowned; see section "See Also".

Heritage Tree

== Personal approach ==
Chan taught the core Northern Shaolin hand sets in a different order than Gu Yujeung. The core ten sets are preceded by an introductory set and 12 Roads Tantui, as inherited by the Central Guoshu Institute. His methodology is propagated throughout the whole Sinobrasileira family.

Romanized names below are given Pinyin (Mandarin) first, then Jyupting (Cantonese).

Introductory set:

- 練步拳 [Liànbùquán / Lin-bou-kyun] Training of Stances and Fists

The five shorter sets:

- 短打 [Duǎndǎ / Dyun-da] Short Strikes (Gu's 6th), 34 patterns
- 梅花 [Méihuā / Mui-fa] Plum Blossom (Gu's 7th), 34 patterns
- 穿心 [Chuānxīn / Cyun-sam] Pierce the Heart (Gu's 4th), 41 patterns
- 武藝 [Wǔyì / Mo-ngai] Martial Skills (Gu's 5th), 41 patterns
- 拔步 [Bábù / Bat-bou] Pull Out the Step (Gu's 8th), 38 patterns

The five longer sets:

- 坐馬 [Zuòmǎ / Jo-ma] Sit on the Horse (Gu's 3rd), 78 patterns
- 領路 [Lǐnglù / Ling-lo] Lead the Way (Gu's 2nd), 76 patterns
- 開門 [Kāimén / Hoi-mun] Open the Gate (Gu's 1st), 63 patterns
- 連環 [Liánhuán / Lin-waan] Interlinked Repetitions (Gu's 9th), 69 patterns
- 式法 [Shìfǎ / Sik-faat] Patterns Techniques (Gu's 10th), 70 patterns

== Trivia ==
On April 11, 2005, the city of São Paulo paid homage to several pioneers of martial arts teaching in Brazil, including Chan, and instituted that date as the city's official Kung Fu Day. Although the date choice refers to the foundation of the São Paulo Kung Fu Federation in 1989, incidentally it also coincides with the date of Chan's first arrival in Brazil in 1960.

== See also ==
- List of Chinese martial arts
