= Chang Dsu Yao =

Chang Dsu Yao 張祖堯
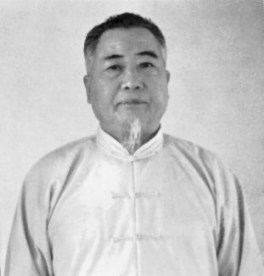
- Born: June 14, 1918; Pei County
- Died: February 7, 1992 (aged 73); Taipei, Taiwan
- Style: Meihuaquan; Tai chi
- Teacher: Liu Baojun

Other information
- Notable school: "Scuola Chang" or "Chang kung fu"

Chang Dsu Yao
- Chinese: 張祖堯
Transcriptions
Standard Mandarin
- Hanyu Pinyin: Zhāng Zǔyáo
- Wade–Giles: Chang Tsu-Yao
- Tongyong Pinyin: Jhāng Zǔyáo
- Yale Romanization: Jāng Dzǔyáu
- IPA: [ʈʂáŋ tsùjǎʊ]
Yue: Cantonese
- Yale Romanization: Jeūng Jóu Jìuh
- Jyutping: Zoeng1 Zou2 Jiu4
- IPA: [tsœ́ŋ tsǒutɕȉːu]
Southern Min
- Hokkien POJ: Tiuⁿ chó͘-Giâu

Alternative Chinese name
- Chinese: 張成勳
Transcriptions
Standard Mandarin
- Hanyu Pinyin: Zhāng Chéngxūn
- Wade–Giles: Chang Ch'êng Hsün
- Tongyong Pinyin: Jhāng Chéngsyūn
- Yale Romanization: Jāng Chéngsyūn
Yue: Cantonese
- Yale Romanization: Jeūng Chìhng Fān
- Jyutping: Zoeng1 Cing4 Fan1
- IPA: [tsœ́ŋ tsʰɪ̏ŋfɐ́n]
Southern Min
- Hokkien POJ: Tiuⁿ Sêng-chiong

Chang Dsu Yao (Chinese: 張祖堯; Wade–Giles: Chang Tsu-yao; 14 June 1918 – 7 February 1992) was a teacher of the martial arts Meihuaquan and tai chi from Taiwan.

== Biography ==
Chang Dsu Yao was born on June 14, 1918 in Chaiji (Chinese: 柴集村), a village in Zhuzhai district of Pei County, Jiangsu. He died in Taipei, Taiwan, on February 7, 1992. He was the sixteenth generation lineage holder of Meihuaquan.

He began to study Meihuaquan when he was six years old, and later trained under Liu Baojun.

In 1938, he came to Guilin to study at the Military School for Officers, a branch of Whampoa Military Academy created in that Year, named "Military Sixth Campus" (Chinese: 軍校第六分校; Wade–Giles: Chün-hsiao Ti-liou Fên-hsiao)). Here, Chang met some important teachers, such as Chang Dongsheng, and studied different styles of Martial Arts, such as bajiquan, baguazhang, xingyiquan, and Fu Style Baguazhang. After graduation, he fought in the anti-Japanese War first and then in the Chinese Civil War with the faction of Chiang Kai-shek against the Communists.

After the defeat of Chiang Kai-shek, Chang Dsu Yao took refuge in Taiwan. In Taiwan he established contact with several famous Martial Artists such as Cheng Man-ch'ing, Liu Yunqiao, Wu Tipang (吳體胖), and Zhang Wuchen. He also taught Martial Arts to the Army and Police. Chang wrote articles for "Wutan Tsa Chih", a magazine founded by Liu Yunqiao.

In 1974, Chang Dsu Yao retired from the Army and in 1975, he moved to Bologna, and then, in 1977, to Milan. He had many students, including his sons Chang Wei-hsin and Chang Yu-hsin, and others, such as Xu Wenli, Maurizio Zanetti, Enrico Lazzerini, and Roberto Fassi, with whom he wrote several books on martial arts.

== Chang School ==
In Italy, people referred to Chang Dsu Yao teachings as "the School of Chang" or "Chang kung fu". This school is divided in two sections: Waijia and Neijia.

- Waijia
- From Nanjing Central Guoshu Institute:

Kung Li Ch'üan (功力拳).

- From Meihuaquan:

a style named Lien Pu Ch'üan (練歩拳), which is a simplified version of Meihuaquan, created in Italy and that takes the name of the famous set in Central Guoshu Institute;
a set named "5 Shaolin" ("Meihuaquan Laojia" (梅花拳老架), known in Taiwan as Meihuaquan Yilujia (梅花一路架);

"Ti Kung Ch'üan" (地功拳) o "Ti T'ang Ch'üan" (地膛拳);

other Meihuaquan sets (erlujia 二路架, sanlujia 三路架, ecc.);
pair exercise named "Po Chi" (搏擊) in Italy, and in China and Taiwan named Tuei Ta (對打).

- From Hongquan:

"Xiao Hongquan" (小洪拳);
"Da Hongquan" (大洪拳).

- From Seven Star Praying Mantis:

the set "Peng Pü Ch'üan" (崩歩拳).

- From Bajiquan: "Tan Ta Shang Chia" (單打上架)

a set from Yuejiaquan
a set from Tsui Pa Hsien Ch'üan (醉八仙拳)

- Neijia

Tai chi:

Yang-style tai chi 108 postures form;
Tuishou;
Sanshou;
Chin Na;
Da Lu (大捋);
Sanshou.

Xingyiquan

Wuxingquan.

Fu Style Baguazhang (Fu Zhensong-style):

Longxing Baguazhang (龍形八卦掌);

Liang-style Yiquan;
Kunlunquan (四象拳).

- Qigong

In Chang Dsu Yao School there are three exercise named "Baduanjin qigong" (八段錦). The first set has traditional Baduanjin movements, the other two are made of modern Stretching exercises.

- Weapons

After the graduation in Black Belt there are the study of many weapons and pair exercises with weapons. Also Weapons teaching is divided into Waijia and Neijia.

- For Waijia, this directory came from the book "Enciclopedia del Kungfu Shaolin":

Bang (棒);
Gun;
Dandao (單刀);
Guai;
Shuang jiegun;
Guandao;
qiang.

Duilian Bingxie (weapons in pair exercises):

Pang tuei Pang (棒對棒);
Kun tuei Kun (棍對棍);
Tan Tao tuei Pang (單刀對棒);
Tan Tao tuei Kun (單刀對棍);
Pang tuei Kun (棒對棍);
Kwai tuei Kun (枴對棍);
Shuang Chieh Kun dui Pang (雙節棍對棒);
Gun tuei Shuang Chieh Kun (棍對雙節棍);
Kwai tuei Tan Tao (枴對單刀).

- For Neijia, weapons came from Yang-style tai chi:

Tai chi dao;
Tai chi gun;
Tai chi qiang;
Tai chi T'ieh Ch'ih (太極鐵尺);
Tai chi Jian

Duilian Bingxie (weapons in pair exercises):

T'ai Chi Tao tuei T'ai Chi Tao (太極刀對太極刀);
T'ai Chi Kun tuei T'ai Chi Kun (太極棍對太極棍);
T'ai Chi Tao tuei T'ai Chi Kun (太極刀對太極棍);
T'ai Chi Tao tuei T'ai Chi Ch'iang (太極刀對太極槍);
T'ai Chi Kun tuei T'ai Chi Ch'iang (太極棍對太極槍);
T'ai Chi Ch'iang tuei T'ai Chi Ch'iang (太極槍對太極槍);
T'ai Chi Chien tuei T'ai Chi Chien (太極劍對太極劍);
T'ai Chi T'ieh Ch'ih tuei T'ai Chi Kun (太極鐵尺對太極棍);
T'ai Chi T'ieh Ch'ih tuei T'ai Chi Ch'iang (太極鐵尺對太極槍).

== Bibliography ==
- Ignazio Cuturello, Giuseppe Ghezzi (1996), De Vecchi (ed.), Kung Fu Shaolin, Milan, ISBN 88-412-2003-1
- Giuseppe Ghezzi (2004), Io e il Maestro
- Liu Pai Meihuaquan (劉派梅花拳), Liu Baojun School (Peixian)
- Peixian Wushu Zhi (沛縣武術志), Peixian, 2000
