= Spiritual Kung Fu =

1978 Hong Kong film by Lo Wei

- Theatrical poster
- Directed by: Lo Wei
- Written by: Pan Lei
- Produced by: Lo Wei
- Starring: Jackie Chan; James Tien; Dean Shek; Yuen Biao
- Cinematography: Chan Wing-shu
- Edited by: Vincent Leung
- Music by: Frankie Chan
- Distributed by: Lo Wei Motion Picture Company
- Release date: 23 November 1978
- Running time: 97 mins
- Country: Hong Kong
- Language: Mandarin
- Box office: est. US$842,386 (Asia); 210,579 tickets (overseas)

Spiritual Kung Fu (Chinese: 拳精) (Quan Jing) is a 1978 Hong Kong martial arts comedy film directed and produced by Lo Wei. The film stars Jackie Chan, James Tien, and Dean Shek. The film features Yuen Biao as one of the Master of the Five Fists martial arts, and Chan was also the film's stunt co-ordinator. The film was also known in some other dubbed language releases as Karate Ghostbuster.

== Plot synopsis ==
Yi-lang (Jackie Chan) is a smart-alec martial arts student at a Shaolin Temple. An anonymous thief steals a book from the library which teaches a potentially fatal style of Kung Fu. Yi-lang, along with a group of five other monks, is punished for not stopping the thief, but his bravery leads to him signing up to defend a supposedly haunted portion of the school.

Upon discovering the ghosts, who are masters of a supposedly lost style of fighting known as The "Five Style Fists", Yi-lang offers himself as a student, masters the form and uses it to progress quickly through the ranks of the school. In order to defend the school against the very thief who stole the book from its library, Yi-lang demonstrates his new style and defeats the invading troupe, with a little help from his five spiritual masters.

== Cast ==
- Jackie Chan as Yi-lang
- Kao Kuang
- Dean Shek
- James Tien
- Yee Fat
- Wang Yao
- Jane Kwong
- Hsu Hong
- Chui Yuen (uncredited)
- Peng Kang
- Li Hai Lung
- Li Chun Tung
- Yuen Biao (uncredited)
- Wang Kuang Yu
- Li Chnig Fu
- Wu Te Shan
- Chung Wai (uncredited)

== Production ==
Along with Dragon Fist, Spiritual Kung Fu was filmed in early 1978. As Lo Wei's studio was running out of money, they shelved both films due to cost-cutting measures and Chan was loaned out to Seasonal Films for a two-picture deal. Whilst there he made Snake in the Eagle's Shadow and Drunken Master with Yuen Woo-ping. The success of these two films at the domestic box office prompted Lo to give belated releases to Spiritual Kung Fu (late 1978) and Dragon Fist (1979).

Spiritual Kung Fu was Lo Wei's response to Chan's earlier attempt at blending comedy with kung fu in the film Half a Loaf of Kung Fu. The supernatural elements of the film were brought to life by some early examples of Hong Kong special effects. Much of the scripted comedy in the film centred on Chan's exaggerated facial expressions and reactions to his ghostly teachers.

The "Five Style Fists" kung fu style is based on the Five Fists (Animal) Pattern, one of the early Martial Arts practiced at the Shaolin Temple, as discussed in Qiu Yue Chan Shi's book "The Essence of the Five Fists". This system contains Dragon, Tiger, Snake, Crane and Leopard / Panther styles.

== Box office ==
During its Hong Kong theatrical run, Spiritual Kung Fu grossed HK$2,397,558 (US$512,299). Upon its 1982 release in South Korea, it sold 80,440 tickets in Seoul, equivalent to an estimated gross revenue of approximately ₩241.32 million (US$330,087). Combined, the film grossed an estimated total of approximately US$842,386 in East Asia, equivalent to US$4.2 million adjusted for inflation.

In France, the film sold 130,139 tickets upon release there in 1983. This adds up to a combined 210,579 tickets sold overseas in Seoul and France.

== Versions ==
- The film was made with the intention of releasing in Mandarin in early 1978 but shelved. Prior to its belated theatrical release late that year, a Cantonese soundtrack and some small edits were made. It wasn't until 1980 that the film was finally given a release with the original Mandarin soundtrack.
- Two Chinese versions of the film have surfaced to date. The most notable difference is during a scene depicting temple duty. In one version (synced in accordance with the Mandarin soundtrack), Yi-Lang is knocked unconscious with an attack to the back of the neck. In the other version (synching with the Cantonese soundtrack), he is knocked out with poison from a burning joss stick; this has caused issues on home video due to mismatched audio/visual.
- The Korean theatrical version contains a completely different opening.

== See also ==
- Jackie Chan filmography
- List of Hong Kong films
- List of martial arts films
