= Yaquan =

Yaquan or Duck Boxing (simplified Chinese: 鸭拳; traditional Chinese: 鴨拳; pinyin: yāquán), also called Duck-Form Boxing (simplified Chinese: 鸭形拳; traditional Chinese: 鴨形拳), is a style of Chinese martial arts, classifiable in the animal-style category, as it imitates the movements of the animal from which it takes its name.

== Origins ==
Its creation was said to have been during the Tang dynasty, and the creator is said to have been a legendary Taoist monk from Mount Emei by the name of Lu Ya (陆雅道人; Lu Ya Daoren, i.e. "Daoist Lu Ya").

This style is inspired by the characteristics of the duck's movements on land and in water, and is notable for its distinctive footwork and use of the head. At the end of the Qing dynasty, this martial art was practiced by Zhang Xishun (张希顺), head of an escort agency in Liaoning.

== History ==
Of the twelve original sequences, only one sequence of 62 movements has survived to the present day. Some movements, such as the Yaxingbu (鸭形步), are also found in the Meihuaquan style.

The Yaquan style is practiced today by Zhou Mingde (周明德) and his daughter Zhou Yuwen (周玉文). Zhou Mingde also transmitted other martial arts, including Heihuquan, Meihua dandao (梅花单刀), and Liuheqiang (六合枪).

== Other media ==
- There is also a VCD on this style: Wushu Jingdian Xilie - Yaxingquan 武术经典系列—鸭形拳, published by Henan Dianzi Yinxiang Chubanshe, demonstrated by Bai Yong 白勇.
- Yan Zhenfa 颜振发 demonstrated the Yaxingquan form in the DVD: Shaolin Damomen quan xie xilie - Yaxingquan 少林达摩门拳械系列 鸭形拳, Renmin Tiyu Chubanshe, ISRC CNM230735200. Yan Zhenfa is a fourth generation of Shaolin Damomen (少林达摩门).

== Bibliography / Further reading ==
- Carmona, José (1999). De Shaolin à Wudang: les arts martiaux chinois (in French). Guy Trédaniel Éditeur. ISBN 2-84445-085-7.
- Duan, Ping; Zheng, Shouzhi, eds. (2007). Wushu Cidian (Wushu Dictionary) (in Chinese and English). Renmin Tiyu Chubanshe. ISBN 978-7-5009-3001-3.
- Li, Hongwen (2008). "Yaquan". Gushi Shijie (in Chinese). No. 24.
- Ma, Changyu. "Minjian Wulin Gaoshou yanlian Yaxingquan". Chengshi wanbao (in Chinese).
- Zhou, Mingde (1987). Yaxingquan. Shenzhou Wushu Congshu (in Chinese). Jilin Wenshi Chubanshe.
