= Wan Laisheng =

- Born: 21 February 1903; Hubei, China
- Died: 8 August 1992 (aged 89)
- Native name: 萬藾聲 万籁声
- Nationality: Chinese
- Style: Shaolin Kung Fu, Zi Ran Men
- Teachers: Liu Xinzhou, Du Xinwu

Other information
- Occupation: Martial artist, professor, writer
- University: China Agricultural University

Wan Laisheng (Chinese: 万籁声; 1903–1992) was a Chinese martial artist and author.

== Early life ==
Wan was born into an affluent scholar's family in Hubei in 1903. He studied at the China Agricultural University and after graduation became a member of the faculty there. It was at the University that he met Liu Xinzhou, who taught him the Liu He Man (Six Harmonies Style) of Shaolin boxing. Wan also sought out the martial arts master Du Xinwu, who was working at the Ministry of Agriculture, and learned Zi Ran Men boxing from him.

== Writing career ==
Whilst working at the University, Wan wrote a series of articles on the martial arts for the Chen Bao Morning News. In 1928, these articles were republished as a book, A Collection of Reviews on Martial Arts. Over the course of his career Wan authored sixteen books on a variety of topics. The most well-known is The Common Basis of Martial Arts (1927), a treatise on many different aspects of the martial arts, with a distinct emphasis on the propagation of martial arts for public health. In The Common Basis..., Wan recommends the investigation and modernisation of traditional Chinese martial arts, a demand that was to be echoed by Bruce Lee and other revivalists some fifty years later. Other books by Wan include titles on philosophy (One Zero Philosophy), medicine and bone-setting (Traditional Chinese Orthopedics), the martial arts (Zi Ran Men, Illustrated Shaolin Lou Han Boxing, Essence of Wushu) and historical biography (Zhang Sun Fen).

== Martial arts career ==
Around the start of his writing career, Wan was also becoming nationally famous for his appearances in martial arts competitions. A successful appearance at the first national contest of the Central Guoshu Institute in 1928 led to a government-sponsored post as director of the Guangdon-Guangxi Martial Arts Academy. It also attracted the interest of Liu Baichuan, a master of the Shaolin Luohan style. Hearing about Wan's exploits at the competition, Liu travelled from Shanghai to Nanjing to challenge the newcomer. The challenge was met by Wan's teacher Du Xinwu, who afterwards recommended that Liu take Wan on as a student.

Wan was one of the "Five Tigers" (the others being Gu Ruzhang, Li Xianwu, Wang Xiao and Fu Zhensong) who were dispatched to Guangzhou to teach their martial arts methods.

Wan held a number of posts during his teaching career. Among other appointments, he was in charge of the Ling Guang Wushu Gymnasium, and was a chief instructor at the Wushu Military Training Centre. He also ran the Hunan Wushu Institute and taught at Guangxi University. In 1939, he established the Yong'an Teachers School of Physical Education. In 1944, Wan became Professor of Sports at Fujian Agriculture and Forestry University, which was to be his last teaching position. He retired from teaching martial arts in 1951, but remained an active practitioner until his death.
