= Du Xinwu =

- Born: 1869; Zhangjiajie, Hunan province, China
- Died: 1953 (aged 83–84)
- Native name: 杜心武
- Other names: Ru Xia (儒侠); Dou Mi Guan Jushi (斗米观居士)
- Nationality: Chinese
- Style: Zi Ran Men
- Teachers: Yang Ke, Xu
- Years active: 1878–1953

Other information
- Occupation: Martial artist, politician, bodyguard, revolutionary, resistance fighter
- University: Tokyo Agricultural University
- Notable students: Wan Laisheng

Du Xinwu (Chinese: 杜心武; Wade–Giles: Tu Hsin-wu; 1869–1953), aka Ru Xia (儒侠), Dou Mi Guan Jushi (斗米观居士) was a Chinese martial artist and an important figure in the development of Zi Ran Men kung fu.

Du was born into a wealthy family in the city of Zhangjiajie in Hunan province. He started training in martial arts at the age of six, and by the time he was nine he was a student of a local martial arts master named Yang Ke. After becoming involved with a revolutionary anti-government movement, Du was forced to flee from Zhangjiajie to the province of Yunnan. Here, in an attempt to find a new teacher, he issued a general challenge by posting a notice on a street corner. The challenge was met by a beggar named Xu (Hsu), a dwarf. Xu soundly defeated Du and then took him on as a student, teaching him the Zi Ran Men style. Du trained with Xu, travelling across the country with him, until the age of 16.

Du was a user of opium even at this young age, and Xu openly disapproved of the habit. On one occasion, incensed at Xu's criticism, Du ambushed his teacher on a bridge, but was surprised when the dwarf overpowered him, knocked him from the bridge and saved him by catching his queue.

After leaving Xu, Du worked as a security guard escorting people and goods. In 1900, he travelled to Japan to study at Tokyo Agricultural University, where he met and befriended the revolutionary leader Song Jiaoren. An introduction from Song led to Du being employed as Sun Yat-sen's personal bodyguard. Now fully engaged with the revolutionary movement, Du used his contacts in China's Tiandihui underworld to help Sun establish the Tongmenghui Party. He abandoned politics after Song's death, and concentrated on esoteric religious practices. He was arrested and imprisoned by the Japanese during the Second Sino-Japanese War, but escaped. He then travelled to Chongqing, where he co-ordinated activities against the Japanese. After the establishment of the People's Republic of China he served in the Ministry of Agriculture and as a consultant to the Hunan Provincial People's Political Committee. Du died from a recurrent injury in 1953 at the age of 84.

Du was noted for his exceptional martial abilities, particularly his skill in kicking. He fought and defeated many martial artists, including Cheng Man-ch'ing and Liu Baichuan. He also taught Wan Laisheng.
