= Liu Baojun =

- Born: 1892; Caozhou
- Died: 1947 (aged 55); Peixian, China; By Execution
- Style: Meihuaquan, Taijiquan
- Teacher: Kong Qingbiao

Other information
- Notable students: Chang Dsu Yao
- Notable school: "Liupai Meihuaquan" or "Baijiazhi Meihaquan"

Liu Baojun (Hanyu Pinyin), or Liu Pao-ch'ün (Wade-Giles) (Chinese: 劉保軍) (1892–1947) was a teacher of the martial arts of Meihuaquan and Taijiquan. He was also known as Liu Jinchen (Hanyu Pinyin), or Liu Chin-ch'en (Wade-Giles) (Chinese: 刘尽臣).

== Biography ==
Liu Baojun was born in 1892 in the village (Chinese: 焦莊村) of Caozhou. He was a master of Meihuaquan, a style that he may have learned from Kong Qingbiao. After working as a bodyguard, from 1925 onwards he taught in Peixian. He was executed in 1947, accused of collaborating with the Japanese occupation army. From the transcript of a short interview with Chang Yu-shin, son of Chang Dsu Yao (a famous student of Liu Baojun, who later moved to Italy):

(Luigi Caforio, interviewer): Did your father see Master Liu Bao Chun again? (Chang Yushin): It is sad to remember that he tried to see him again but was never able to. He tried many times in vain. At a time when the invaders were in retreat, Chinese authorities unjustly accused the Master and his family of collaborating with the enemy. My father, who was a soldier and had returned from Shandong was able to free himself and the Master's family of those charges. But he was unable to clear the Master himself, who was summarily executed. It will never be known if he actually collaborated with the enemy. Those charges were never proved, but Liu Bao Chun was executed nonetheless.

— Luigi Caforio, Il Capostipite

In October 1925 Liu Baojun participated in a competition in Nanjing, where he won a pair of double sabres (shuangdao) as a prize. In 1937, in Peixian, he participated in a competition in which he won a banner with a golden dart as a prize. Master Liu was a direct-lineage student of Yang style tai chi chuan Grandmaster Yang Chengfu, as evidenced in Yang Chengfu's first book, the Taijiquan Shiyongfa, that contains the list of his disciples, where Liu Baojun's name appears.

== Liu Baojun and Meihuaquan ==
Liu Baojun belonged to the Bai branch of the Meihuaquan martial art family (Baijiazhi Meihuaquan). When he moved to Peixian, he created his own branch of the style, which was later called, in his honor, Liupai Meihuaquan (Boxing of the Plum Flower, of the School of Liu.) Initially he taught with Li Zhengting, who was from the Luodi Meihuaquan family, but they later parted ways.

His most famous students in Peixian were Chang Dsu Yao, Fang Dunyi (方敦義), Fang Dunle (方敦樂), Zhao Houfu (趙後福), and others.

== Bibliography ==
- Chang Dsu Yao, Roberto Fassi (1986). L'enciclopedia del Kung Fu Shaolin. Vol. 1 (Edizioni Mediterranee ed.). Roma. ISBN 88-272-0016-9.
- Chang Dsu Yao, Roberto Fassi (1987). L'enciclopedia del Kung Fu Shaolin. Vol. 2 (Edizioni Mediterranee ed.). Roma. ISBN 88-272-0211-0.
- Chang Dsu Yao, Roberto Fassi (1989). L'enciclopedia del Kung Fu Shaolin. Vol. 3 (Edizioni Mediterranee ed.). Roma. ISBN 88-272-0356-7.
