= Leopard Blow =

Type of punch used in unarmed combat

"Leopard Blow," "leopard punch," and "leopard fist" are common terms for a specific type of striking blow, associated primarily with the Leopard Kung Fu substyle of the Five Animals in Chinese martial arts, though it is also used in styles such as Krav Maga, Choy Li Fut and Karate (in which case, it is known as "Hiraken Tsuki" or "Ryotoken Tsuki"). The maneuver involves folding the first two joints of the fingers inward and striking with the fore-knuckles. It is used most often to strike at soft, vulnerable targets, such as the ribs, throat, inner arms and temples.

== Forming the fist ==
The fist is formed by folding the first two joints of the fingers. There are two variations of the maneuver; the first involves folding only the first four fingers of the hand. The second involves compressing the fist further by folding in the thumb as well to the side of the hand. The advantage of using the first is that it has a slightly longer reach and can be formed faster. The second variation's advantage is that it is more firm, reducing the risk of injury to a user's hand.

== Usage ==
The nature of this strike allows for greater penetration against weak spots on an opponent's body, but presents a very real risk of self-injury should a user be careless while using it. The strike is, therefore, best used at close range, where it is easier to reach soft targets and where there doesn't need to be too much force behind the blow to deal significant damage. It is also recommended that users strike from angles when attacking with this fist, as this decreases the impact to one's hand whilst still maintaining the impact delivered to an opponent.

This strike is also a useful tool in self-defense where long fingernails may impede other strikes. With the leopard fist, fingernails do not usually get in the way when forming the fist. It also amplifies the damage done to an opponent by focusing the force of a punch over a much smaller surface area. Aside from striking with the metacarpals, the palm heel and the side of the hand may also be used against an opponent.

The strike is most prominently used in Leopard Kung Fu, but can also be found in certain styles of Karate, such as Kyokushin, Shotokan and Uechi-ryū (though they are rarely used), Kempo and in rare cases, Wing Chun. It is also sometimes used as the primary weapon of Choy Li Fut practitioners.

== Possible uses ==
This form of strike can be used against any target, but is most commonly demonstrated as a strike to the throat, ribs, solar plexus, side of the stomach, kidneys, groin, bladder, back muscles, inner arms, jugular vein, side of the face, eyes, cheekbones, bridge of the nose, upper lip, jaw and temples.

== In the media ==
The Leopard Blow is also the name of a special Dim Mak maneuver used by Lady Shiva, a comic book supervillain published by DC Comics.

In Detective Comics #443 published by DC Comics, a villain called the Enforcer uses "an off-beat variation on the Leopard's Paw knuckle strike" against Batman. Later, his "overuse [of] that knuckle strike variation" allows Batman to guess the Enforcer's true identity.

The Marvel Comics superhero known as Iron Fist uses this punch in the Netflix TV series of the same name.
