= Animal styles in Chinese martial arts =

- Focus: Striking, Chin Na, Qigong
- Country of origin: China
- Creator: Five animal forms: Jueyuan & Li Yuanshou (Li Sou) with Bai Yufeng (co-founders); Five animal play: Huatuo & Jiun Chiam (attributed)
- Parenthood: Five animal forms: 18 Luohan Hands, Neigong; Five animal play: Qigong
- Descendant arts: Fujian White Crane, Hung Ga

In Chinese martial arts, there are fighting styles that are modeled after animals.

In Southern styles, especially those associated with Guangdong and Fujian provinces, there are five traditional animal styles known as Ng Ying Kung Fu ("Five Forms")—Tiger, Crane, Leopard, Snake, and Dragon. The five animal martial arts styles supposedly originated from the Henan Shaolin Temple, which is north of the Yangtze River, even though imagery of these particular five animals as a distinct set (i.e. in the absence of other animals such as the horse or the monkey as in tai chi or xingyiquan) is either rare in Northern Shaolin martial arts—and Northern Chinese martial arts in general—or recent ("Five Form Eight Method Fist"). An alternate selection which is also widely used is the crane, the tiger, the monkey, the snake, and the mantis.

In Mandarin, "wuxing" is the pronunciation not only of "five animals", but also of "five elements", the core techniques of xing wu quan martial arts, which also features animal mimicry, but often with ten or twelve animals rather than five, and with its high narrow Santishi stance, these look nothing like a Fujianese Southern style found in the North. Other animal styles of various types are sometimes used.

== Origin and Formation ==
=== The 12 animals of Xinyiquan ===
The Xingyiquan 12 animal forms were some of the chronologically first manifestation of animal-based martial arts. The 12 animal forms emulate the techniques and tactics of the corresponding animal rather than just their physical movements. Some of the animal techniques have only simple, straightforward movements where others are more complex and involve a sequence of mimicking movements.

Xingyiquan 12 animal forms are as follows

- Alligator – gliding
- Snake – sliding
- Ostrich – ramming
- Cockerel – combative
- Swallow – skimming
- Hawk – soaring
- Eagle – gripping
- Eagle or Bear – stability
- Horse – speed
- Tiger – courage
- Monkey – agility
- Dragon – contracting and expanding

== Later manifestations ==
=== Origin of Southern Shaolin animalistic martial arts ===
According to legend, Jueyuan, a 13th-century Shaolin martial artist, used the original 18 Luohan Hands as a foundation, expanding its 18 techniques into 72. In Gansu Province in the west of China, in the city of Lanzhou, he met Li Sou, a master of "Red Fist" Hongquan. Li Sou accompanied Jueyuan back to Henan, to Luoyang to introduce Jueyuan to Bai Yufeng, master of an internal method.

They returned to Shaolin with Bai Yufeng and expanded Jueyuan's 72 techniques to approximately 170. Using their combined knowledge, they restored internal aspects to Shaolin boxing. They organized these techniques into Five Animals: the Tiger, the Crane, the Leopard, the Snake and the Dragon.

Jueyuan is also credited with the Northern style "Flood Fist" Hongquan, which does not feature the Five Animals but is written with the same characters as the Southern style Hung Kuen, perhaps the quintessential Five Animals style.

Moreover, as in the Southern Hung Kuen, the "Hong" character (洪) in Hongquan actually refers to a family name rather than its literal meaning of "flood." However, the two styles have nothing in common beyond their shared name.

==== Five-animal exercise in present-day qigong ====
The 5 animal forms of Southern Shaolin, like Hung Ka and Choy Li Fut, are quite different from the 12 animal forms of Xingyiquan. The Southern Shaolin five animal forms developed after 12 animal forms of Xingyiquan, with about 600 years in between. The techniques used in the 5 element forms complement those used in the 12 animal forms and add more striking, kicking and stepping techniques.

The "Five Animal play" (Wuqinxi) are a set of qigong exercises developed during the Han dynasty (202 BC – 220 AD). Some claim the author of this qigong sequence to be Hua Tuo, however Yang Jwing-Ming suggests it was the Taoist Master Jiun Chiam and Huatuo merely perfected its application and passed it onto gifted disciples including Wu Pu, Fan E, and Li Dangzhi.

The five animals in the exercises are the tiger, deer, bear, monkey and crane. According to TCM theory of wuxing (Five Elements), each animal has two exercises corresponding to the yin and yang internal organs (zangfu). Regular practise of this qigong is said to improve functioning of the Liver/Gallbladder (Wood Element – tiger), Kidneys/Bladder (Water Element – deer), Spleen/Stomach (Earth Element – bear), Heart/Small Intestine (Fire Element – monkey) and Lung/Large Intestine (Metal Element – crane) respectively.

===== Tiger =====
The first animal is Tiger. It relates to the wood element, the season of spring, and therefore the liver and gallbladder. The liver's emotion is anger and has many important functions including storing blood (Xue), ensuring the smooth movement of qi in the body, and housing the ethereal soul (hun). Liver Xue nourishes the sinews, therefore, allowing physical exercise. The liver is often compared to an army general because it is responsible for the smooth flow of qi, essential to all physiological processes of every organ and part of the body. The hun provides the mind (Shen) with inspiration, creativity, and a sense of direction in life. The emphasis of this exercise is grasping and stretching. By reaching up to bring down Heaven and reaching down to draw up Earth grasping is encouraged; which relates to sinews and therefore the liver. Rolling through the spine stimulates both yin and yang of ren mai and du mai channels activating the microcosmic orbit. This is then completed with a slow 'stalking' forward bend and sudden shout (release of anger) as the Tiger catches its prey with vigor while standing on one leg, to stretch the sinews while activating the jing-well points at the tips of the fingers, opening PC-8 and incorporating another important Wood trait

===== Deer =====
The second animal is Deer. It relates to the water element, the season of winter and therefore the kidneys and bladder. The kidneys emotion is fear and is often referred to as the "root of life" as they store essence (jing). Jing determines basic constitution, is derived by our parents and established at conception. The kidneys are the foundation of yin and yang in the body and therefore every other organ and govern birth, growth, reproduction and development. They also produce marrow, control bones and the Gate of Life (Minister Fire), while housing willpower (Zhi). By twisting the torso, the energy of one kidney is opened while the other is closed creating a pump to regulate chong mai and therefore yuan qi. Fire (heart) and water (kidney) must connect energetically to maintain health. The hand gesture replicating horns calms Shen and connects with the heart by keeping the middle fingers in touch with the palms via the pericardium and san jiao channels. The eyes are the 'window' to shine and are smiling and joyous as we turn to look at the back heel and medial malleolus (kidney channel), also connecting fire.

===== Bear =====
The third animal is Bear. It relates to the earth element, the season of late summer and therefore the spleen and stomach. The spleen's emotion is worry and is the central organ in the production of gu qi from the food and drink we ingest. The spleen's transformation and transportation of gu qi are paramount in the process of digestion which is the basis for the formation of qi and xue. The spleen is where the intellect (yi) is said to reside and is responsible for applied thinking and the generating of ideas, memorizing and concentration. This animal is cumbersome and its awkward traits are expressed in each movement. It starts off with circular abdominal massage to aid digestion by warming and supporting spleen yang, using the entire upper torso to move the hands. The arms are then poised to open and stretch the armpit activating the spleen's close relationship with Heart and Liver (Heart is the "mother" of spleen and liver stores xue) by stretching the flanks. The palms are empty to open PC-8 as the hip is raised to shift the leg forward while keeping the knee straight. The swinging torso and heavy step activates kidney yang to supports spleen yang in heating and "cooking" food.

===== Monkey =====
The fourth animal is Monkey. It relates to the fire element, the season of summer and therefore the heart and small intestine. The heart is considered the most important and therefore the "emperor" of the internal organs. It relates to the emotion joy and its main function is to govern and circulate xue in the vessels to nourish tissues and house the mind (Shen). Shen is used to indicate the entire sphere of mental and spiritual aspects of a human being and therefore encompasses hun, Zhi, yi and corporeal soul (po). Similar to the heart, the monkey is forever moving like the flickering of a flame. With the first exercise, suddenly lifting the hands with hook palms up towards the chest, the shoulders towards the ears and balancing on the toes with the monkey looking to the side, squeezes the heart and pumps xue as you release down again. The second part calms Shen by clearing the mind (moving the branch) to grasp the peach (fruit of heaven) with the thumb inside of the palm to hold the Hun within. Grasping in this exercise relates to the liver's ability to hold and store xue, while the lifting of the back heel activates the Kidneys also supporting the Heart. The peach is then brought into view but is too heavy and must be supported as the monkey enjoys his find and soon to be "treat".

===== Crane =====
The fifth animal is Crane. It relates to the metal element and the season of autumn and therefore the lungs and large intestine. The Lungs emotion is sadness and governs qi and respiration, while being in charge of inhalation and the regulation of water passages. They are the intermediary organ between man and his environment, likened to a prime minister in charge of qi regulation particularly in the blood vessels to assist the heart in controlling blood circulation. The lungs house po the most physical and material part of the human soul; sensations and feelings. The activation of the microcosmic orbit is again featured by firstly working the spine in a concave fashion. The shoulders are raised and squeezed into the neck to squeeze the heart and pump xue while the arms are brought up to mimic a beak and the tailbone is thrust out. The arms are brought back along with one leg to mimic gliding. The second part of the exercise regulates the ascending (liver – xue) and descending (lungs – qi) function of qi in the Lungs. The ultimate yin and yang expressed by breathing in (kidneys) and breathing out (lungs) connects these two organs to regulate xue and assist the heart. The rhythm created by the up and down movement of the body, the opening and closing of the arms (lung and large intestine channels) and the in and out breath helps us adapt to the rhythmical changes of the seasons. The final stretch upwards on one leg stretches the flanks and therefore the liver and gall bladder channels to balance with the Lungs. The lungs are said to be "spoilt" being the last organ to start working just after birth and are therefore fragile and sensitive to change, explaining why gentle exercise is preferred.

== Complete list of animal styles ==
Although the technique is mainly associated with the tiger, dragon, snake, crane and leopard, many other animal styles have been developed:

1. Bear
2. Boar
3. Crane
  - Fujian White Crane
  - Tibetan White Crane
4. Deer
5. Dog
  - Dog kung fu
6. Dragon
  - Southern Dragon kung fu
7. Duck
  - Yaquan
8. Eagle
  - Eagle Claw
9. Leopard
  - Leopard kung fu
10. Monkey
  - Monkey Kung Fu
11. Horse
12. Mantis
  - Northern Praying Mantis
  - Southern Praying Mantis
13. Panther
14. Scorpion
15. Snake
  - Snake kung fu
16. Tiger
  - Fu Jow Pai
  - Hak Fu Mun
  - Heihuquan
17. Toad
18. Tortoise
19. Wolf

== In popular culture ==
- In the 1978 Hong Kong action martial arts film Spiritual Kung Fu , Jackie Chan stars as a laïc student in the legendary Shaolin Temple of South who practices wuxingquan ("Five Forms Boxing").
- In the film Wendy Wu: Homecoming Warrior, Shen uses statues of the Five Animals containing the spirits of five monks to train the title character with those spirits possessing her teachers.
- In the Kung Fu Panda franchise, supporting characters the Furious Five consist of a crane, snake, monkey, mantis, and tiger. Additionally, their predecessor Tai Lung was a leopard whose name meant "Great Dragon". The main character, Po, is a panda bear, who is appointed the title of "Dragon Warrior".

== See also ==
- Bando, a Burmese martial art that also features animal styles
