= Modern history of East Asian martial arts =

East Asia, the region dominated by Chinese, Japanese and Korean culture, was greatly transformed following its contact with the West in the 19th century. This defining period can be considered as the start of the modern period of East Asian history, and also happens to be the time of origin of most schools of martial arts of East Asian origin practiced today. New approaches and ideas about martial arts were created that are distinctly different from the previous history of martial arts, especially under the influence of nascent nationalism in the region, which took the respective traditions of martial arts as being part of the nation's heritage to be polished and standardized into a pure form and showcased to the rest of the world.

As a result, the modern martial arts of China and Japan are for the most part a product of the nationalist governments in power during the 1920s and 1930s, in the case of Korea developed under Japanese occupation and cast in terms of a Korean national art during the 1950s. The modern history of Indochinese martial arts is closely related, and especially modern Muay Thai was developed in the years leading up to and following the Siamese revolution of 1932.

In many countries local arts like Te in Okinawa, kenjutsu and jujutsu in Japan, and taekyon and soobak in Korea mixed with other martial arts and evolved to produce some of the more well-known martial arts in the late nineteenth and twentieth centuries like karate, aikido, and taekwondo.

== China ==
During the Republic of China's Kuomintang government of mainland China (1915–1949), the Jing Wu Athletic Association (established in 1910) together with the Central Guoshu Institute (established 1928) played an important role in the preservation of traditional schools of martial arts and their transformation into the various modern styles practiced today. In October 1928, the Central Guoshu Institute held a national examination, the so-called Leitai raised platform full contact competition, which came to be regarded as one of the most significant historic gatherings of Chinese martial arts masters.

== Japan ==
Koryū is the Japanese term for all martial arts schools that predate the Meiji restoration (1860s); they are typically named with -jutsu (術) and emphasized effectiveness in Japanese feudal warfare. The systems of Japanese martial arts that post-date the Meiji Restoration are known as gendai budō, and are typically named with -dō (道). These include judo, karate, kendo, kyūdō, iaidō, and aikido. These newer systems are commonly valued as sports or arts for self- development, self-improvement, rather than methods for killing or maiming a battlefield opponent.

== Korea ==
The modern Korean martial arts developed in the early 20th century, under influence of the Japanese martial arts of the period. Thus, hapkido originates from Daitō-ryū Aiki-jūjutsu during the Japanese occupation of Korea (1910–1945).

Taekwondo was developed from karate for use in the Republic of Korea Armed Forces from 1954. For this purpose, karate terminology needed to be "nationalized". The name taekwondo was coined by shotokan practitioner and army general Choi Hong Hi. After the Korean War, Taekwondo was further developed into a purely sportive discipline, since 1973 overseen by the World Taekwondo Federation. During 1964–1966, Choi Hong Hi continued to promote taekwondo, working to put together a world-class exhibition team. Taekwondo's emphasis on jumping and flying kicks dates to this period. While taekwondo was based on karate, the structural changes made in the 1950s and 1960s were significant, and it cannot now be considered a branch of karate, but is a standalone modern martial art. Taekwondo was presented at the Summer Olympics as a demonstration sport in 1988 and 1992, and became an official Olympic discipline in 2000.

== Western interest ==
The Western interest in East Asian Martial arts dates back to the late 19th century, due to the increase in trade between the West and China and Japan. Reports on various Chinese and Japanese martial arts appeared in both academic journals and in the popular press during the later 19th century. However, relatively few Westerners actually practiced the arts, considering it to be mere performance.

Edward William Barton-Wright, a British railway engineer who had studied Jujutsu while working in Japan between 1894 and 1897, was the first man known to have taught Asian martial arts in Europe. In 1899 he also founded an eclectic martial arts style named Bartitsu which combined jujutsu, judo, boxing, savate and stick fighting. Within ten years, jujutsu classes were being taught in many Western countries including England, France, Germany, Italy, the USA, Australia and New Zealand. Subsequently, an awareness of jujutsu, in particular, entered Western popular culture and the art was featured in innumerable newspaper and magazine articles, novels and instructional manuals throughout the early-mid 20th century.

Its use during pre-war and World War Two showed the practicality of martial arts in the modern world and were used by Japanese, US, Nepalese (Gurkha) commandos as well as Resistance groups, such as in the Philippines, (see Raid at Los Baños) but not so excessively or at all for common soldiers.

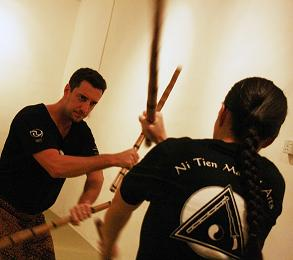
Filipino Martial Arts (Eskrima) from Ni Tien Martial Arts Schools

However, aside from jujutsu, Asian martial arts remained largely unknown in the West even as late as the 1950s; for example, in the 1959 popular fiction Goldfinger, Karate was described to readers in near-mythical terms and it was credible for British unarmed combat experts to be represented as completely unaware of martial arts of this kind. The novel describes the protagonist James Bond, an expert in unarmed combat, as utterly ignorant of Karate and its demonstrations, and describes the Korean 'Oddjob' in these terms:

"Goldfinger said, 'Have you ever heard of Karate? No? Well that man is one of the three in the world who have achieved the Black Belt in Karate. Karate is a branch of judo, but it is to judo what a Spandau is to a catapult...'."

Such a description in a popular novel assumed and relied upon karate being almost unknown in the West. It linked karate with judo, whereas in reality karate is a distinct art almost unrelated to judo.

As Western influence grew in East Asia a greater number of military personnel spent time in China, Japan, and Korea. Exposure to martial arts during the Korean War was also significant. Gradually some soldiers saw the value of Eastern martial arts and began training in them.

With large numbers of American servicemen stationed in Japan after World War II, the adoption of techniques and the gradual transmission of entire systems of martial arts to the West started, eventually resulting in American Karate and other adaptations. It was in the 1950s, however, when this exportation of systems really began to gain momentum. Large groups of U.S. military personnel were taught Korean arts (Taekwondo) during the Korean War. American interest in martial arts began to broaden in the late 1960s after Bruce Lee played the role of Kato in The Green Hornet. This show introduced Asian martial fighting styles to the American television audience. In the early 1970s, martial arts movies furthered the popularity of martial arts.

This exportation of the martial arts led to such styles as sport karate, which became a major international sport, with professional fighters, big prizes, television coverage, and sponsorship deals.

The later 1970s and 1980s witnessed an increased media interest in the martial arts, thanks in part to Asian and Hollywood martial arts movies and very popular television shows like "Kung Fu" that incorporated martial arts moments or themes. Jackie Chan and Jet Li are prominent movie figures who have been responsible for promoting Chinese martial arts in recent years.

== See also ==
- Origins of Asian martial arts
- Historical European martial arts
