= Meihuaquan =

Styles of kung fu

Meihuaquan (Chinese: 梅花拳; literally "plum-blossom Fist") is a common term used to name styles or exercise sets of kung fu:

- 1) a style of kung fu that originated in the northern provinces of China centuries ago. Meihuaquan is also known as Meihuazhuang (梅花桩).
- 2) other kung fu styles with the name, like Meishanquan from southern China;
- 3) exercise, or sparring, sets within differently named styles of kung fu, like Da and Xiao Meihuaquan in Songshan Shaolinquan.

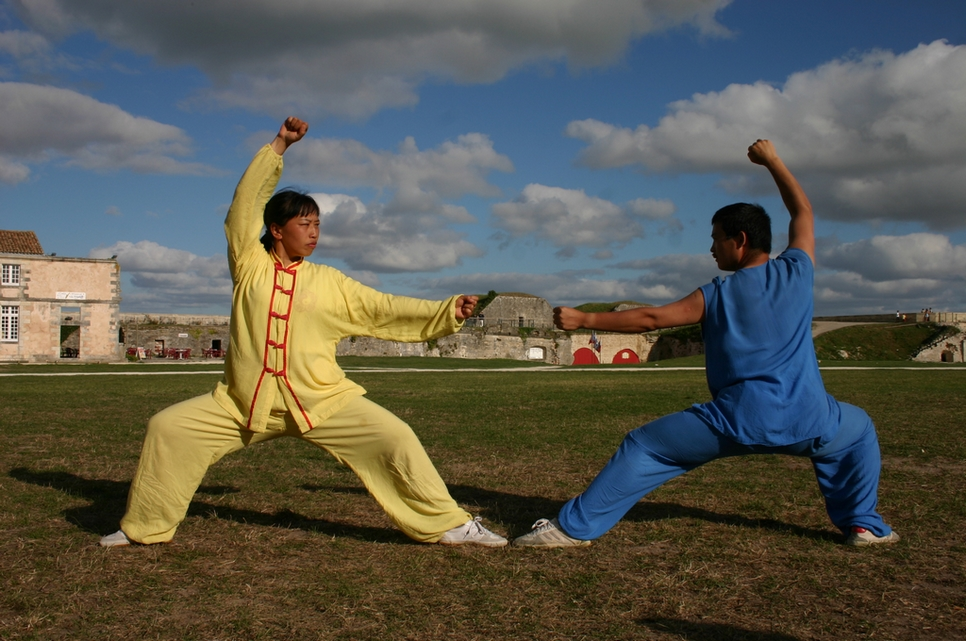
Dashi

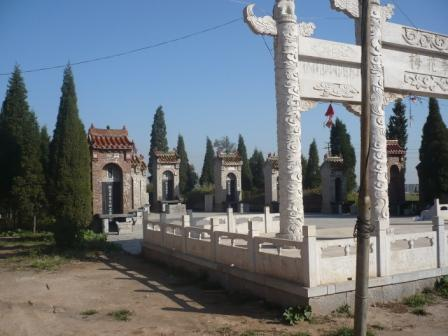
Group of steles dedicated to masters of Meihuaquan near the Houmazhuang village.

== Meihuaquan and its branches ==
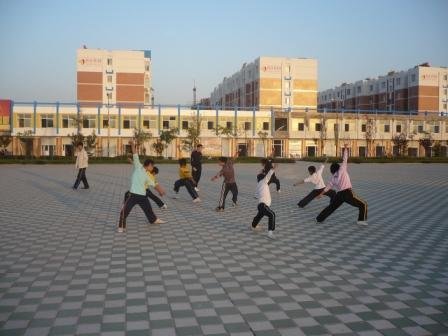
Pingxiang: Group Meihuaquan practise, Shunshi

There are many Meihuaquan that have the same origins: Ganzhi Wushi Meihuazhuang, Baijiazhi Meihuaquan, Luodi Meihuaquan, Wuzi Meihuaquan, Leijia Meihuaquan, etc. There are various traditions regarding the foundation of this style; it is said that Meihuaquan has no single founder.

=== Ganzhi Wushi Meihuazhuang ===
Ganzhi wushi meihuazhuang (干支五式梅花桩, Plum-blossom Pillars of Stems and Branches) is a branch of Meihuaquan, shortened to Meihuazhuang (Plum-blossom Pillars). Ganzhi is a contraction of Tiangan Dizhi, or more fully Tiangan Dizhi Wushi Meihuazhuang. The eighth-generation master Zhang Congfu created a new kind of practise called Xiaojia (Little Frame) as opposed to the older style known as Dajia (Big Frame).

Meihuazhuang is divided into two parts: Wenchang (literary) encompasses theory; Wuchang (martial) encompasses techniques such as Jiazi (frame), Shoutao (sparring exercise to teach combat skills), Chengquan (combat choreography), Yingquan (combat), and Gongquan and Ningquan (moving in war).

Jiazi is characterized by five static positions (Wushi: 五式, five patterns; or 五势, five postures) intermixed with dynamic motion (Xingbu, 行步), and consisting of light rapid footwork and large flowing movements. With a simple expansive posture and built-in poise, Meihuaquan releases and strengthens the flow of energy to increase concentration of the mind. The basic training methods of Meihuaquan are simple, strong, relaxed, and highly adaptable.

"Meihuazhuang" ("pillars of plum-blossom") is a shortened form of "ganzhi wushi meihuazhuang" ("trunks, branches and five forms on pillars of meihua plum"), this style also being known as "meihuaquan" ("fist of meihua plum"). It has more than a thousand-year history. This style originates with monks and belongs to the Kunlun branch of Chinese martial arts. Over a long time it passed from father to son, from son to grandson, only through the male line, which was a reason for the name "fuziquan" ("fist of father and son"). Consequently, although this style is known from ancient times, it spread widely only at the end of the Ming, and the beginning of the Qing, dynasties, in Hebei, Henan, Shandong, and Shanxi provinces.

— Meihuazhuang (pillars of meihua plum)

=== Baijiazhi Meihuaquan ===
Baijiazhi Meihuaquan (白家支梅花拳, Bai-family Branch of Plum-blossom Boxing) is a Meihuaquan practised in the southwest part of Shandong Province. It was founded by Bai Jindou (白金斗, Pai Chin-tou, in Wade-Giles), a ninth generation master of Plum Blossom Boxing. In Taiwan this school is called Beipai Shaolin Meihuaquan (北派少林梅花拳, Plum Blossom Boxing of Shaolin Northern Faction) or Meihuamen(梅花门, Plum Blossom School). Jiazi of this school are referred to as Meihuaquan Laojia (Old Frame of Plum Blossom Boxing). While studying this set, disciples often train in pairs—duida (hit in pair) and duilian (train in pair)—with and without weapons. At the basic level, duida are only for two opponents and of two kinds: hand-and-kick techniques, or falling techniques. At intermediate level, disciples practise combat against two to five people. At the advanced level, they may study war and Meihua Zhen Gong Fang (梅花陣攻防, Plum Blossom's Arrays).

=== Leijia Meihuaquan ===
Leijia Meihuaquan (雷家梅花拳) is a branch of Meihuaquan that derives its name from having been practiced near Leijiacun village and spreading to the surrounding area. This branch is clearly related to the Ganzhi Wushi Meihuazhuang, as it identifies in its lineage Zhang Sansheng (or Zhang Zhenshu (张朕书), a second generation master). This type of Meihuaquan differs from the Ganzhi Wushi Meihuazhuang and the Baijiazhi in having only four postures rather than the usual five: dashi, aoshi, xiaoshi, and baishi. Dashi is roughly identical to the shunshi of the other branches. The attitude of the hands during the basic form (Jiazi) is characterised by the open palm.

=== Wuzi Meihuaquan ===
Wuzi Meihuaquan (武子梅花拳) is a shortened form of Sun Wuzi Chuanxin Meihuaquan (孙武子穿心梅花拳, Plum Blossom Boxing Piercing the Heart of Sun Wuzi), also called Sun Wuzi Meihuaquan (孙武子梅花拳), Chuanxin Meihuaquan (穿心梅花拳), or Zhongxin Meihuaquan (中心梅花拳). Disciples of this school believe it was founded by Sun Zi, also known as Sun Wuzi. A famous master of this branch is Kou Yunxing (寇运兴). The sets of Wuzi Meihuaquan are Shilu Tantui (十二路弹腿); Da Meihuaquan er lu e san lu (大梅花拳二、三路); Xiao Meihuaquan er lu (小梅花拳二路); Meihuadao (梅花刀); Meihua longxingjian (梅花龙形剑); and Meihua qiang (梅花枪).

=== Luodi Meihuaquan ===
Luodi Meihuaquan (落地梅花拳, Plum-blossom Boxing on Ground) is a generic name for Meihuaquan, but can indicate a branch that was taught by Li Zhenting (李振亭) in Peixian. The core of this system is Luodi Meihuaquan Bajiao (落地梅花拳八角, Eight Angles of Plum Blossom Boxing on Ground).

=== Meihua Changquan ===
Meihua Changquan (梅花长拳) is the name given to a branch of Meihuaquan taught on the island of Taiwan by Han Qingtang, a branch that is part of a wider system that includes other boxing styles of northern China. Its followers also call it Changquan or Beishaolin. Han Qingtang learned this Meihuaquan in Jimo from Sun Maolin (孫茂林) and Jiang Benhe (姜本河), two masters originally from Liangshan. This Meihua boxing has three forms: Maifuquan (埋伏拳), Shizitang (十字趟), and Taizu Changquan (太祖长拳). They also taught a duilian named Xiaowushou (小五手).

=== Shangsheng Meihuaquan ===
Shangcheng Meihuaquan (上乘梅花拳, Plum-blossom Boxing of Optimal Quality) is a branch of Meihuaquan taught in Fujian by Wang Jincheng (王金城) to his son Wang Ding (王鼎, 1882–1985).

=== Shaomoquan – Wang Xiangzhai and Meihuaquan ===
Among the several styles analyzed by Wang Xiangzhai in a well-known interview is the style of Meihuaquan that is called Wushizhuang (五式桩, Five-figures Pole), which tradition says was taught in Henan and Sichuan. Wang Xiangzhai had contact with this style during his travels through China, in 1928 making friends with Liu Pixian, a master of the twelfth generation of Meihuaquan, with whom Wang Xiangzhai compared methods. After this experience Liu Pixian created a new style to which he gave the name Shaomoquan (少摩拳).

=== Weapons ===
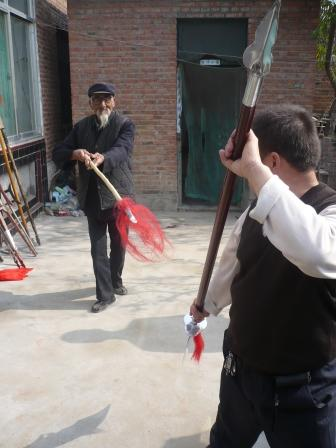
Dadao dui Qiang at Liangshan.

Training in Meihuaquan includes the use of eighteen types of traditional weapons, some of which are rarely seen. This is the list of weapons in Baijiazhi Meihuaquan in Taiwan: dandao (單刀), Qimeigun (齊眉棍), qiang (槍, spear), shuangdao (雙刀, double sabre), Xiao shao gun (小哨棍), jian (劍), Da shao gun (大哨棍), jiujie gangbian (九節鋼鞭, see jiujiebian), liuxingchui (流星錘, meteor hammer), sanjiegun (三節棍), Meihua Guai (梅花拐), Bishou (匕手), dadao (大刀, alebard). The first book on rarely-seen weapons is by Genyuan (根源):

Master Zou Hongyi came from Xuzhou, on a little chariot. He traversed the Yellow River with four disciples, and with these weapons: Liuxingchui (流行锤), a Fenghuolun (风火轮), some Sanjiegun (三节棍, also named Da shaozi 大梢子), a Qijiebian (七节鞭), two Wenbang (文棒), a scale (上天梯Shang Tianti), a Qunqiangmu (群枪母), two Xiaoguai (小拐) Liangtianchi (量天尺), Yiben sanqiang (一锛三枪), etc.

— Le armi nel Meihuaquan

=== Origins of Meihuaquan ===
The origins of the style are lost in legend. It is said that when Zhang Sansheng taught in public, there had been 100 generations of teachers before him.

In many of the rural areas in which meihuazhuang has been practiced for centuries, the founding of the sect is attributed to the mythological figure Yun Pan. Villagers often say "Meihuazhuang existed since the beginning" and folk legends claim that its history extends to the Han dynasty. Meihuazhuang's oldest written records, genealogies and textual, date to the records of 2nd-generation master Zhang Sansheng.

— History of meihuazhuang

Other sources claim an origin before the Han dynasty, from Shaolinquan:

There are different versions of the origins of Meihuaquan: one legend said it came from the Shaolinquan.... Another maintained that Meihuaquan would have been present before the time of Han Wudi (emperor 187-140 B.C.). Lacking written reports it is impossible to conduct a textual search and so my information depends from what my old Master, Liu Baojun, said: "Meihuaquan would have originated from no one ancient founder living in a specific age; but it synthesizes the ancient military tactics of our country and is the quintessence of both Shaolin and Taiji. Meihuaquan is the result of experiences during years and years of study, experimentation, and transformation, becoming a typical Chinese martial art." Meihuaquan is a critical search for the models of Wushu, and, in spite of the resemblance with Shaolin and Taiji, is different from the latter styles. Meihuaquan's style is deep and well-researched. It must be compared to Shaolin or Taiji with caution, because many Meihuaquan movements are absent from the latter disciplines. The oral tradition of my old Master has the value of a written report.

— Chang Dsu Yao, Meihua Quanshu – Jianjie

=== Meihuaquan and History ===
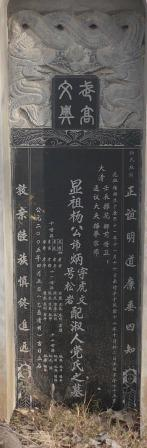
Stele of Yang Bing

Some Meihuaquan disciples believe that there were 100 generations of masters before the 20 who came after the Ming dynasty. During the Qing dynasty people who practiced this style were involved in various uprisings, like Wang Lun in 1774, Feng Keshan in 1814, and Zhao Sanduo in the 1900 Boxer Uprising. (Meihuaquan was particularly linked with the early phases of the Boxer Uprising.) Another practitioner, Yang Bing, was an Imperial Palace guard:

The history of this school (Meihuaquan) goes back at least to the kang-xi period, when it was taught by a certain Yang Bing, from Hua county in Henan, who had passed the highest military examination with third place honor, and served in the metropolitan garrison

— The origins of the Boxer Uprising

Now we know that Yang Bing is a fifth-generation master born in Neihuangxian, not in Huaxian.

About Feng Keshan and Meihuaquan:

In the 1800s, Feng Keshan developed the Mei Hua Quan or Plum Flower Boxing style. This style was strongly based on internal chi circulation and large external circular movements. It was developed out of the Shaolin system. In 1814, Feng recruited members for the Eight Diagrams Sect (Ba Qua Jiao) and participated in an anti-Ching uprising. He was caught by the Ching Court, found guilty, and executed by dismemberment. The Mei Hua style was attributed to Wu Mei (also called Ng Mui), who was a legendary figure – a Shaolin nun, in order to disguise Feng Keshan`s underground activities. The style was essentially a condensing of Shaolin's best techniques into one system and with its own footwork patterns (five directions) unifying the techniques.

— The history of traditional Chinese martial arts: Southern Style During the Qing Dynasty

Unfortunately, there aren't other sources to confirm that the style was attributed to Wu Mei. Feng Keshan is of the eighth generation. The legend of Wu Mei came from another style named Wumeihuaquan, or Wumeipai, and is found in some accounts of Yongchunquan, a martial art not practiced by Feng Keshan, and different from Meihuaquan.

== Other Meihuaquan styles ==
=== Meishanquan ===
Meishanquan (梅山拳, Plum Mountain Boxing), also known as Meihuaquan, is a style created during the Song dynasty in Meishan county of Hunan. It has 77 sets.

=== Hunan Meihuaquan ===
A style named Meihuaquan was spread in Hunan during the period of Guanxu (光绪, 1875–1908), by the master Wan Fuzi (万福子), who learned it in Sichuan.

=== Emei Meihuaquan ===
Information on Emei Meihuaquan (峨嵋梅花拳, Plum-blossom boxing of the Emei mountain) is scanty. It is said that Zhou Beitao (周北涛) created a set with this name, made up of over 100 figures, after a long meditation with his forehead touching Meihua plants. The book Zhongguo Wushu Renmin Cidian (中国武术人名辞典) instead alleges that Zhou would have learned Meihuaquan, and Taijiquan, from Zhang Yimin (张镒民), in 1930. There are various styles of Meihuaquan from Sichuan.

=== De'ang Meihuaquan ===
The members of the De'ang (德昂族), of Yunnan and the area south of Sichuan, have practiced Meihuaquan since the Ming dynasty. Plum-blossom Boxing figured in the White Lotus Rebellion, between 1794 and 1805, in Sichuan, Shaanxi, Henan and Hubei, the revolt also known as Chuanchu Bailianjiao Qi Yi (川楚白莲教起义, Rebellion of schism of the White Lotus in Sichuan and Hubei) or Chuanchu Jiao Luan (川楚教乱, Chaotic Schism of the Sichuan and the Hubei).

=== Meihua Jiequan ===
Meihua Jie Quan (梅花捷拳, Plum-blossom Fast Boxing) is a style of Chinese martial arts derived from the Shaolin School. Han Kuisheng (韩愧生), a man of Shandong, practiced this boxing and taught it to Fu Xiushan (傅秀山) from Yucheng (禹城). Fu has published a book titled Jiequan Tushuo (捷拳图说) about the style. Meihua Jie Quan uses the fists as in Xingyiquan, palm blows as in Baguazhang, and has figures as in Yunu Chuansuo (玉女穿梭) and Danbian (单鞭), an identical to Taijiquan. It has five basic figures (Wushi): Pi (劈), Tiao (挑), Shan (闪), Chong (冲), and Xie (斜). Hand strikes are divided into high, medium, and low types, with like types for agility. The complete form is made up of 48 figures, comprising the start and end positions, according to 12-character formulas (十二字诀, Shier zi jue).

=== Shunshimen and Meihuaquan ===
Shunshimen (顺式门) is a composite style with the following forms belonging to Meihuaquan: Meihuaquan (梅花拳), Chuanlinzhang (穿林掌), Bafangzhang (八方掌), Meihua Sanshou Ershi Shi (梅花散手二十式), Meihuaqiang (梅花枪), and Wuhu qunyang gun (五虎群羊棍).

=== Wumeiquan or Wumeipai ===
Wumeiquan (五枚拳, Boxing of Wumei) or Wumeipai (School of Wumei) is a style of Chinese martial arts which may be put in the Nanquan class. Some write Wumeiquan with other ideograms (e.g. 五梅拳, Five-plum Boxing); in Cantonese it is Ng Mui Kuen. In the Wumeiquan Quanpu (五梅拳拳谱) it is said that the style has been handed down from a Buddhist nun (尼姑) whose religious name was Wu Mei (五梅). In other traditions Wu Mei was a Taoist nun (Daogu, 道姑). She transmitted the style to Huang Baoshan (黄宝善; also known as Huang Baolin, 黄宝林)—of the city of Lufengxiang (庐丰乡), of Shanghangxian (上杭县), in Fujian province—who handed it on in turn to Gong Rongguang (龚荣煌) of Lanxixiang (兰溪乡), also in Fujian. Gradually the style spread through Fujian and Guangdong. The Annals of the County of Shanghang (上杭县志, Shanghang Xianzhi) tell that, at the end of the Qing dynasty, Wumeiquan (五梅拳), which is the orthodox Shaolin boxing, was diffused throughout the districts of Lanxi (蓝溪), Huangtan (黄潭), Taiba (太拔), and the same Shanghang. These are some sequences of hand-fighting taught in New York: Tianguangzhang (天光掌), Wuxingquan (五行拳), and Shier Dizhi (十二地支). This style is often practiced "free form", giving wide latitude to the free application of the movements. These are the weapons used in the school of Shanghang Sanchiba (三齿耙): gou lian qiang (钩镰枪); qinglongdao (青龙刀); mupa (木耙); dandao (单刀); shuangdao (双刀); jian (剑); fu (斧); shuang tongchui (双铜锤); tiechi (铁尺); hutoupai (虎头牌); and bandeng (板凳).

== Sets in other styles ==
Many styles have sets named Plum-blossom Boxing within their programs, including Cailifo, Tanglangquan, Hongdong Tongbeiquan, Songshan Shaolinquan, and Hongjiaquan.

=== Shaolin Meihuaquan ===
There are two sets named Shaolin meihuaquan (少林梅花拳) in Songshan Shaolinquan: Xiao Meihuaquan (Little Plum-blossom Fist) and Da Meihuaquan (Big Plum-blossom Fist). Xiao Meihuaquan is also known as Shaolin Ditang Meihuaquan. It is said that these sets were created by Jinnaluo Wang (紧那罗王).

=== Shaolin Yi Zhi Mei ===
In Southern Shaolin style Nam Pai Chuan (南北拳), Yi Zhi Mei Quan (一枝梅拳) or Single Plum Blossom Fist is a popular form created by Shi Gao Can.

=== Cailifo Xiao Meihuaquan ===
In Cailifo (蔡李佛, Choyleefut) is Little Plum-blossom Boxing (小梅花拳), a famous set with this name.

=== Hongjia Meihuaquan (Hunggar Mui Fa Kuen) ===
Hongjia Meihuaquan (洪家梅花拳, Plum-blossom Fist of Hong Family) is a set of Hongjiaquan, better known as Mui Fa Kuen in Cantonese. Its complete name is Shizi Meihuaquan (十字梅花拳, Crossing Plum-blossom Fist; in Cantonese, Sap Ji Mui Fa Kuen).

=== Meihuaquan and Tanglangquan ===
Tanglangquan has varied connections with the Meihuaquan name. One of the main branches of the style is called Meihua Tanglangquan, and another Taiji Meihua Tanglangquan. Some forms are called Meihua, and in particular one is known as Meihuaquan. Others are Meihualu (梅花路) and Meihuashou (梅花手). Three sets together are "three bloomed hands". Jiang Hualong (姜化龙), founder of the branch Babu Tanglangquan, would have practiced Meihuaquan before beginning to study Praying Mantis boxing.

=== Qilu Chaquan Meihuaquan ===
In Chaquan there is a taolu (form) called Meihuaquan and the Seventh Way of the Chaquan (七路查拳).

=== Gu Ruzhang Bei Shaolin Meihuaquan ===
Another Seventh Way (Qilu, 七路) is the Meihuaquan of Bei Shaolin of Gu Ruzhang, whose form and style probably is derived from Chaquan.

=== Qianhou Meihuaquan ===
Qianhou Meihuaquan (前后梅花拳) is the name of a sequence of Liuhequan.

=== Qimen and Meihuaquan ===
Qi School (亓门, qímén) contains a form called Meihuaquan, which is a method of preparation for all incoming boxing students in the school.
