= Zhao Sanduo =

Qing Boxer leader

- 赵三多
- Born: 1841
- Died: 1902 (aged 59–60)
- Other names: Zhao Zhusheng (赵祝盛); Zhao Laozhu (赵老祝)
- Occupation: Boxer

Chinese name
- Traditional Chinese: 趙三多
- Simplified Chinese: 赵三多
Transcriptions
Standard Mandarin
- Hanyu Pinyin: zhào sānduō
- Wade–Giles: chao san-to

Zhao Sanduo (simplified Chinese: 赵三多; traditional Chinese: 趙三多,1841–1902) was a leader of the Boxer Rebellion during the late Qing dynasty. His courtesy name was Zhusheng, and he was also known as Zhao Laozhu or Zhao Luozhu. He had led many attacks against foreign nationals and Christians in China from 1892 to 1900. He was arrested by Yuan Shikai in 1902 and died in prison.

== Early life ==
Zhao was born into a lower gentry family in Shaliuzhai Village of Wei County, Zhili. From a young age, he studied martial arts under Zhang Rukuan, and later became a skilled practitioner and master of Meihuaquan (Chinese: 梅花拳, lit. 'Plum flower boxing').

In 1895, Zhao set up boxing gyms in villages and towns of Wei and neighboring counties, recruiting more than 2,000 disciples into Meihuaquan.

== Uprisings ==
In 1869, Christian missionaries in Liyuantun of Guan County reached an agreement with local landlords to convert a temple dedicated to the Jade Emperor into a church. This decision sparked widespread opposition from the villagers, who impeded the conversion in the following decades. By 1892, the temple was demolished. In response, the leaders of the protest, known as Shiba Kui (Chinese: 十八魁, lit. 'Eighteen Chiefs'), invited Zhao and his followers to join their cause.

In the spring of 1897, the Christians in Liyuantun attempted to construct a church on the site of the former temple. On 24 March, Zhao and his disciples arrived in Liyuantun and held a boxing show for three days. More than 3,000 people arrived to protest against the local government and missionaries. Fighting broke out on 27 April, which led to the destruction of the newly constructed church. By early 1898, Zhao started using the name Yihequan (Chinese: 义和拳, lit. 'Harmony and justice boxing') for his group, as many practitioners of Meihuaquan sought to distance themselves from anti-foreign and anti-Christian activities. Around the same time, Cao Ti, the acting governor of Guan County, initiated negotiations with the boxers. Zhao agreed to the terms proposed by Cao, and dismissed his followers in exchange for relocation of the planned church and official pardon for the boxers.

In June, under pressure from the French minister to China Stephen Pichon, the Qing government overturned the previous resolution to favor the missionaries. On 24 October 1898, Zhao and the Eighteen Chiefs gathered in Jiangjiazhuang, Guan County. With a group of 3,000 people, they started an uprising under the slogan "Fu Qing Mie Yang" (Chinese: 扶清灭洋, lit. 'Support the Qing, destroy the foreigners'), and attacked churches as well as armed strongholds of the local Christians. On 27 October, Zhao's group broke off from other boxers and returned to Wei County. Initially surrendering to the government on 31 October, they later rejoined the rebellion on 3 November. Qing army managed to quell the uprising on the next day. Most of the boxers scattered, while Zhao and a small group of followers fled to Linqing and went into hiding.

In 1900, Zhao and his followers carried out multiple attacks on churches in Fucheng and Linqing. On 6 November, they were surrounded by the troops of Yuan Shikai, the then governor of Shandong, in Houwei Village of Wei County. Despite sustaining significant casualties, Zhao managed to lead the remaining forces in a breakout and retreated to Guangzong, Zhili. He and his followers continued to attack churches and carry out Junliang (Chinese: 均粮, lit. 'Equalize grain') operations in southern and central Zhili.

== Arrest ==
After the Eight-Nation Alliance captured Beijing, Zhao and his followers joined forces with Jing Tingbin, who had similarly amassed an army in opposition to the Boxer Protocol. On 23 April 1902, the combined rebel army launched a revolt in Julu County with the aim of "Sao Qing Mie Yang" (Chinese: 扫清灭洋, lit. 'Eliminate the Qing, destroy the foreigners'). Zhao was reportedly known for leading multiple charges at the forefront of the army with a black flag. In June, the uprising was suppressed by Yuan Shikai. Zhao was captured, and he later died in prison during a hunger strike.

== Bibliography ==
- Cohen, Paul A. (1997). History in Three Keys: The Boxers as Event, Experience, and Myth. Columbia University Press. ISBN 978-0-231-10650-4.
- Esherick, Joseph (1987). The Origins of the Boxer Uprising. University of California Press. ISBN 978-0-520-06459-1.
- Li, Gengxin (6 September 2018). The Elergy for a Century: Christians, Imperialism, North China Society, and the Boxer Rebellion (in Simplified Chinese). American Academic Press. ISBN 978-1-63181-963-6.
