= Leopard kung fu =

Chinese martial art

Leopard kung fu 豹拳
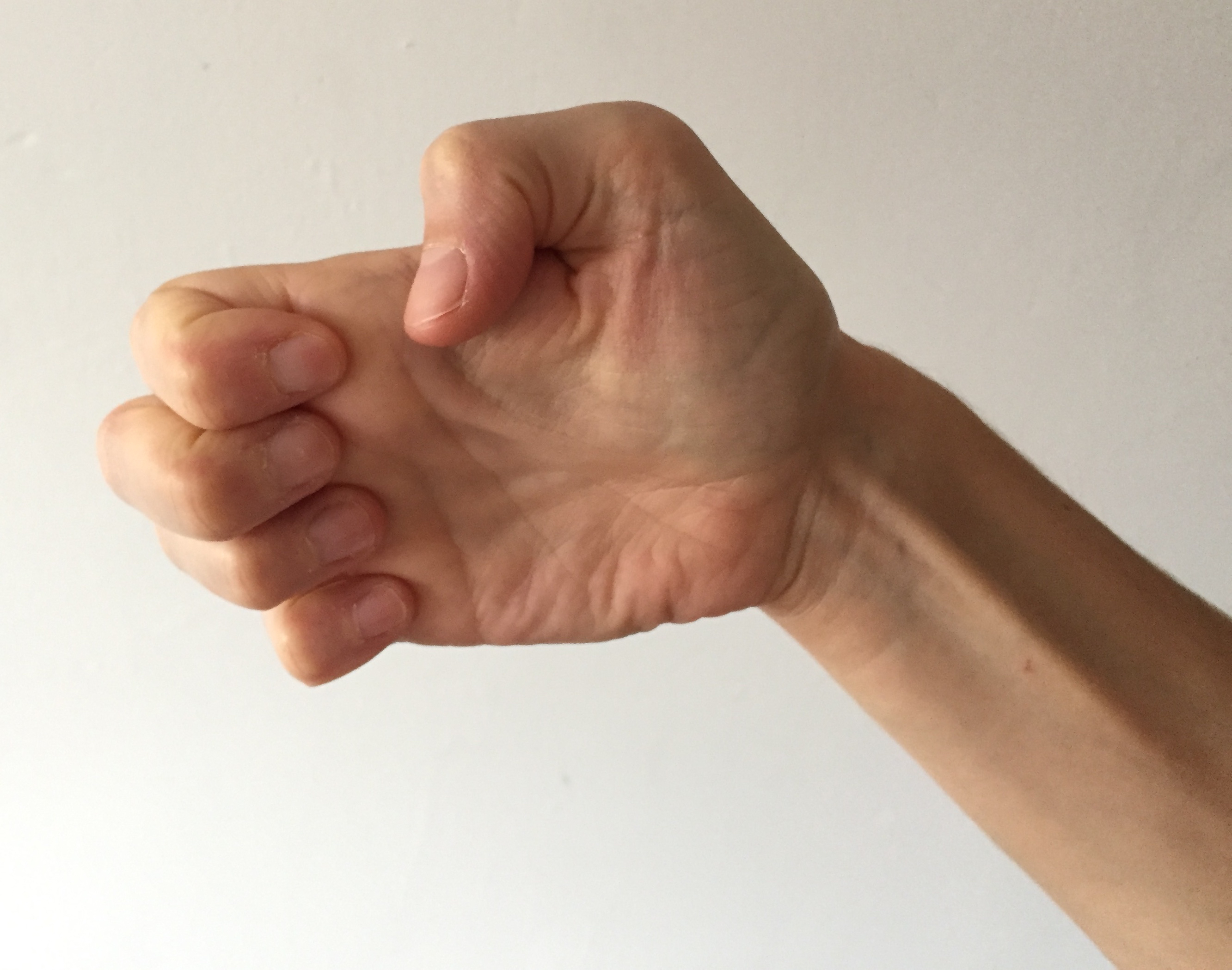
- Also known as: Bàoquán, Leopard Fist
- Focus: Striking
- Country of origin: China
- Creator: Jueyuan with Li Yuanshou (Li Sou) and Bai Yufeng (co-founders)
- Parenthood: Wuxingquan, Luohan quan, Neigong, Hongquan
- Descendant arts: Li Gar, Fanzi (Yingzhao style)

Leopard kung fu is style of southern Chinese martial arts and is one of the Five Animal styles, fighting styles modeled after animals and their actions.

== History ==
It was supposedly created by Jue Yuan with help from Bai Yufeng and Li Sou.

== Features of the style ==
The emphasis of Indochinese leopard is speed and angular attack. The leopard does not overwhelm or rely on strength, as does the tiger, but instead relies on speed and outsmarting its opponent. The power of the style derives from its aggressive speed.

The leopard practitioner will focus on elbows, knees, low kicks, and leopard punches. Leopard kung fu is a hit, damage and run style designed to overcome superior forces with inferior resources. Counter attacks are sudden, indirect and short, with the aim of landing a debilitating technique.

The primary goals whilst learning the Leopard style are:

1. Develop the speed of one's muscles for external strength.
2. Teaching patience so as to attack when the moment calls for it.
3. Using the leopard punch for penetration.
4. Training the lower body for enhanced springing power.

The leopard style was founded on the creators' observation of the movements of the leopard in the wild, and therefore practitioners of the style imitate these movements. Leopard style is geared towards the use of one to three technique combinations that cause a lot of damage, disorientating or even blinding the attacker. Blocking is wasted in Leopard – the style can best be summed up with the phrase: "Why block when you can hit?". It does not rely on rooted stances, and would only assume a stance whilst attacking in order to launch at the opponent. The hit-and-run strategy of the leopard style, something especially effective against larger opponents, is unique to the animal.

The primary weapon is the leopard fist, which can be likened to a half-opened fist. The primary striking surface is the ridge formed by folding the fingers at the first phalangeal joint; the secondary striking surface is the palm hand. Some of the most well-known strikes include the "Phoenix Eye", a punch to the pressure points near the eye and temple done by using only the knuckle of the index while the rest of the fingers are kept in a usual fist form. The leopard fist can also be modified by slightly lifting the fingers to form a claw, the "Leopard Claw" can be used to rake, slash, and tear at the face and throat of an assailant.

The leopard style is thought to be a midway point between the Tiger and Crane styles, in that it focuses on strength and height.

An interesting technique of the leopard is the ability to simultaneously block and strike the opponent. This is not commonly used in the harder martial arts (like the other Shaolin styles, for example). The sheer speed of the leopard is a defining characteristic of the style.
