= Fu Jow Pai =

Chinese martial art

Fu Jow Pai (虎爪派) Tiger Claw Style
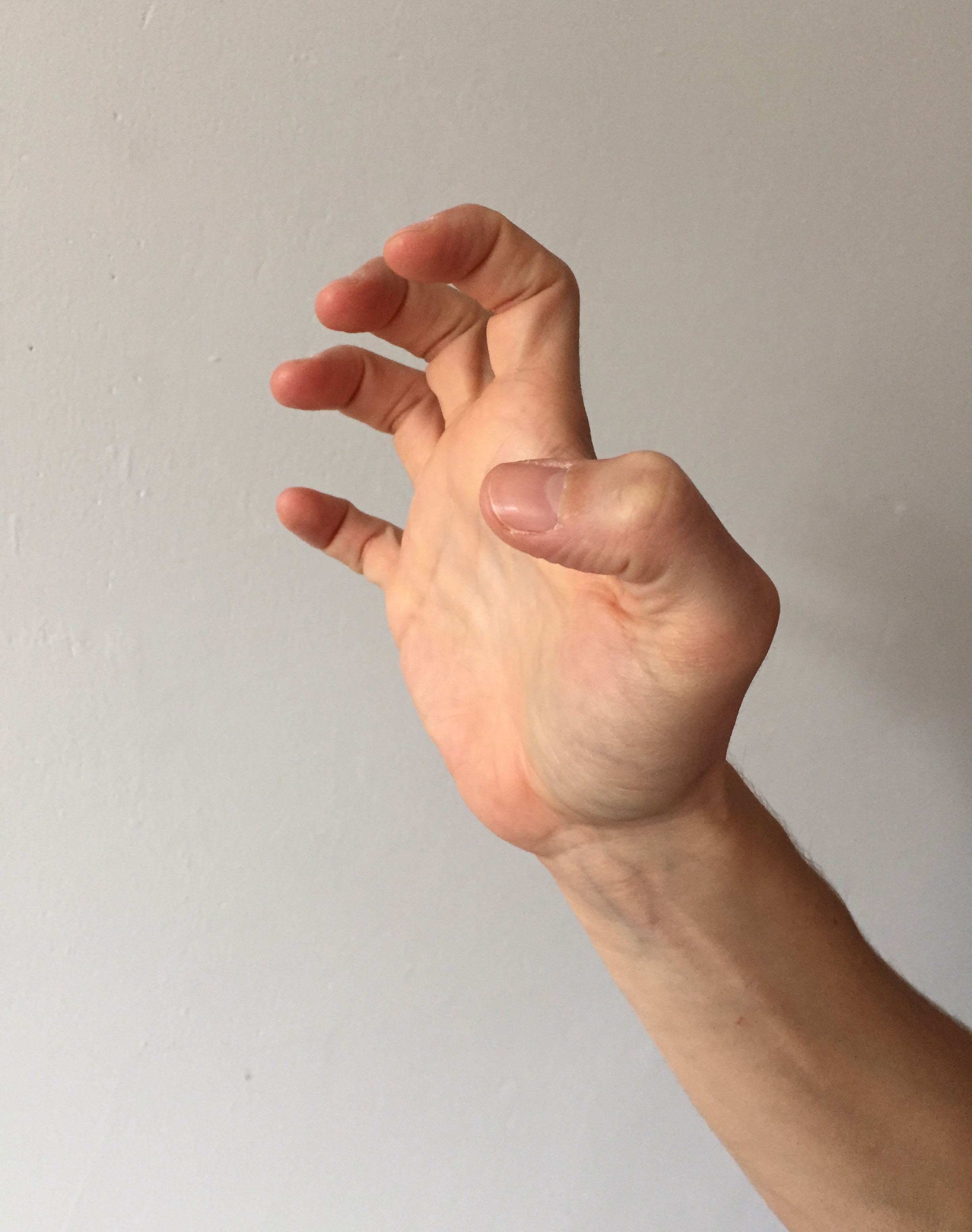
- Also known as: Hark Fu Moon (黑虎門); Black Tiger System
- Focus: Striking, throwing, joint manipulation
- Country of origin: China
- Creator: Wong Bil Hong
- Famous practitioners: Paul Eng
- Parenthood: Shaolin Kung Fu, Hung Gar

Fu Jow Pai
- Chinese: 虎爪派
- Jyutping: fu2 zaau2 paai3
- Hanyu Pinyin: Hǔzhǎopài
- Literal meaning: Tiger Claw Style/Branch
Transcriptions
Standard Mandarin
- Hanyu Pinyin: Hǔzhǎopài
- Wade–Giles: Hu^{3}-chao^{3} P'ai^{4}
Yue: Cantonese
- Yale Romanization: fú jáau paai
- Jyutping: fu2 zaau2 paai3

Hark Fu Moon
- Chinese: 黑虎門
- Jyutping: hak1 fu2 mun4
- Hanyu Pinyin: Hēihǔmén
- Literal meaning: Black Tiger Sect/School
Transcriptions
Standard Mandarin
- Hanyu Pinyin: Hēihǔmén
- Wade–Giles: Hei^{1}-hu^{3} Men^{2}
Yue: Cantonese
- Yale Romanization: hāk fú mùhn
- Jyutping: hak1 fu2 mun4

Fu Jow Pai (Chinese: 虎爪派, Tiger Claw Style), originally named Hark Fu Moon (Chinese: 黑虎門, Black Tiger System) is a Chinese martial art that originated in the Hoy Hong Temple of Guangdong, China, during the Qing dynasty. The system "was modeled after the demeanor and fighting strategy of an attacking South China tiger. Techniques unique to Fu-Jow Pai are ripping, tearing, clawing and grasping applications."

== Influences ==
Lineage

Anonymous Monk of Hoy Hong Temple	??-??
First Generation Grand Master Wong Bil Hong	b.1841 d.1934
Late Grand Master Wong Moon Toy	b.1907 d.1960
Grand Master Wai Hong 伍偉康掌門	b.1938

Other key dates

1876	Wong Bil Hong begins studying Hark Fu Moon
1927	Wong Moon Toy begins studying Hark Fu Moon
1934	Wong Bil Hong renames the system Fu Jow Pai
1934	Wong Moon Toy arrives in New York City
1940	Wong Moon Toy started teaching Hung Gar
1957	Chinese Youth Athletic Club formed for the instruction of Fu Jow Pai (private)
1960	Wai Hong becomes the successor of the system
1968	Chinese Youth Athletic Club becomes Fu Jow Pai Federation, opens to the public

Fu Jow Pai Grand Masters trained in the following additional styles:

- Wong Bil Hong mastered Hung Gar under Wong Kei-Ying and his son, Wong Fei-Hung.
- Wong Moon Toy 黄公文 mastered Hung Gar under Lam Sai Wing + Wong Bil Hong and Mizongyi under Lau Chook Fung and Doon Yuk Ching before training in Hark Fu Moon with his uncle, Wong Bil Hong.
- Wai Hong 伍偉康 also learned (most notably) Hung Gar, Mizongyi, Choy Lee Fut, and tai chi.

== Contributions ==
In 1971, Wai Hong sponsored the first all open style full-contact kung fu tournament in the US and which became the model for future US full-contact tournaments. He also founded the Eastern United States Kung-Fu Federation, which he led for eight years. Fu-Jow Pai has appeared in multiple movies, documentaries, and tournaments.

== See also ==
- Chin Na
- Shuai Jiao
- Heihuquan (unrelated northern Chinese martial art)
- Tiger Claws (film)
