= Iron palm =

Body of training techniques in various Chinese martial arts

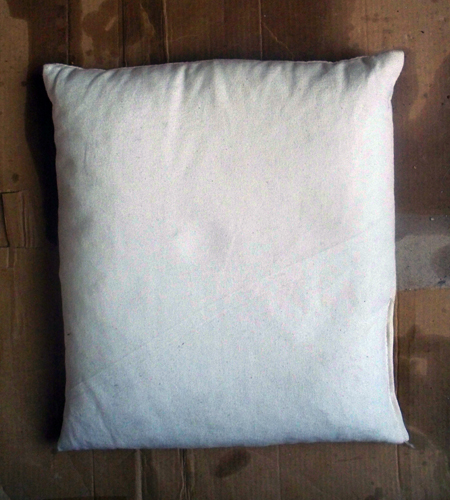
Canvas bag filled with gravel, used in Iron Palm training.

Iron palm or iron hand (Chinese: 鐵沙掌, 鐵砂掌 or 鐵絲掌; pinyin: tiě shā zhǎng or tiě sī zhǎng; lit. 'hands hard as iron yet soft as silk') is a body of training techniques in various Chinese martial arts. It is one of the original 72 arts of the Shaolin temple. These conditioning techniques are typically meant to condition the hands to allow a practitioner to deliver very powerful blows without injury to their hands.

== Overview ==
Iron Palm is the vernacular for the results of serious training centered mainly on the palm of the hand, although other parts of the hand may also be targeted, and covers many different conditioning methods. Most Iron Palm systems are considered internal, utilizing qigong exercises to train other aspects of development in addition to the external conditioning which ultimately alters the internal structures of the hand, such as the bones and sinews.

Not all Iron Palm methods are a martial arts style unto itself, but rather form a special feature of specialized conditioning that appears in many schools of Chinese martial arts. Some non-Chinese martial arts styles, such as Muay Thai and many schools of Karate, also feature hand conditioning, but the term Iron Palm is not typically used to describe these types of training, as they tend not to focus on developing internal power when conditioning the hands for the bone-crushing forces encountered with the striking maneuvers evident in breaking normally "unbreakable" objects.

== General principles ==
Iron Palm training often involves three primary components:

1. Strengthening of the striking limbs by developing the tendons and ligaments from the shoulders to the fingertips, then striking or slapping relatively hard objects enclosed in canvas/leather bags. Following a conditioning session, the striking area is usually treated with a medicinal aid created from plant derivatives, usually a traditional Chinese liniment called Dit Da Jow. A common belief among practitioners is that failing to apply Dit Da Jow after Iron Palm training sessions can have negative effects on long-term health, such as movement limitation, arthritis, and other nerve damage to the hands. Soaking and thorough massaging of hands after training is imperative.
2. Using proper technique to strike with greater force: As in other martial arts, students learn specific body mechanics with the intent to produce a more powerful strike. Students train to relax the body and release residual tension in order to move faster. This is usually done with standing meditation routines designed to release the residual tension in the body and develop "linking" power.
3. Engaging in Qigong [氣功] exercises, purportedly in order to develop "qi" (also chi or ch'i, or Japanese/Korean, ki [氣]). This Qigong training coordinates breathing to improve mental focus, resulting in a more powerful strike.

== Direct and indirect methods ==
Schools of Iron Palm training are often divided into "direct" or "indirect". Both methods usually consist of striking progressively harder surfaces. Some practitioners also refer to their training as Neijin ("internal strength") or Li ("strength", also known as Waijin, "external strength"), referring to the Qi energy or type of force (jin) used. In the "direct" method the hands are thrust into buckets or containers of the medium; the hands come into direct contact with the substance. In the "indirect" method, the practitioner strikes bags or other containers filled with various materials. As training progresses, the bags or buckets are filled with increasingly resistant substances, starting with beans then sand, progressing onto gravel or river rocks (i.e. smooth pebbles), then finally steel, copper, or iron shot. Practitioners can measure their progress based upon the number of strikes performed in a particular training session or by the amount of clock time spent training. Relaxation while training the strikes and use of good Dit Da Jow medicine is imperative to yielding proper success. Exacting breath control is also essential for maximum effect/success.

== Uses ==
The Chinese martial arts can utilize a wide variety of open and closed hand strikes. Hardening the hands is also considered by some to supplement speed and strength lost through aging. Iron palm practitioners often demonstrate their abilities by breaking hard objects such as bricks, coconuts, stones and boards with their bare hands or in some cases forcefully hitting a steel object rapidly without sustaining significant injury.

== Techniques ==
Iron Palm uses five different striking techniques:

- Slapping with the whole palm
- Throwing with the back of the hand
- Cutting with the side of the palm
- Dotting with the fingertips
- Stamping with the base of the palm

These techniques are used when striking the Iron Palm bag which can be filled with a variety of materials such as sand, rice, dried mung beans or soy beans, pea gravel, or steel shot (whether bird shot or buck shot), depending on one's level of expertise. Sometimes a mixture is utilized, e.g. soybeans & steel shot in the same bag. Before and after each training session, an Iron Palm liniment is applied to the hands to prevent injury and condition the hands. Tie Ba Zhang Yao is a popular liniment used for Iron Palm training and conditioning.

== See also ==
- Ku Yu Cheung
- James Yimm Lee
- Iron Shirt
- Dim Mak
