= Ziranmen =

Style of kung fu

Ziranmen 自然門
- Focus: Striking
- Country of origin: China
- Creator: Dwarf Wu
- Famous practitioners: Du Xinwu, Wan Laisheng
- Olympic sport: No

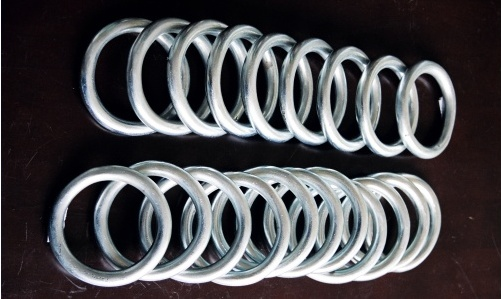
Ziranmen iron rings.

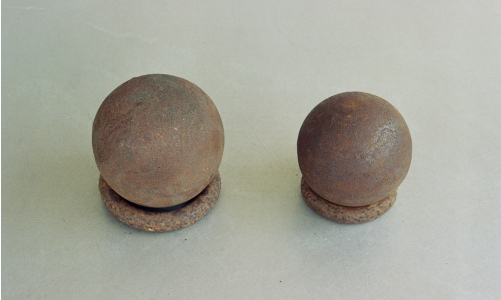
Metal balls used in Ziranmen.

Ziranmen (simplified Chinese: 自然门; traditional Chinese: 自然門; pinyin: zìránmén; Wade–Giles: tzu-jan men; literally "the ziran ["natural"] style"), also known as Natural Boxing, is a Northern internal style of kung fu that is taught in conjunction with qigong breathing techniques. The style traces its lineage to Dwarf Xu, who based it on ancient Taoist philosophy. Du Xinwu, the next bearer of the lineage, served as a bodyguard to Sun Yat-sen, then the provisional president of the Republic of China. Du imparted his knowledge of "Natural Boxing" to his eldest son Du Xiusi and Wan Laisheng, a prominent twentieth century martial artist.

== Philosophy ==
Ziranmen is based on ancient Taoist philosophy, Traditional Chinese Medicine and, most importantly, the philosophy of "One and Zero". It combines physical training, qigong, meditation and combat techniques. Through training, Ziranmen is said to enhance the spirit of the mind, regulate the circulation of qi and develops physical sensitivity. According to practitioners when the body is in harmony, one will live a long and healthy life.

The main principle of Ziranmen is to overwhelm the opponent by attacking continuously, using every part of the body to strike. Ziranmen make use of four fundamental techniques: Tun (contraction), Tu (expansion), Fu (floating) and Chen (sinking). These techniques are generally expressed through movement of the spine. Ziranmen is also noted for its footwork (bu fa), which involves moving lightly on the balls of the feet and enables sudden changes of direction. Kicks are a key part of the art's arsenal.

== Training ==
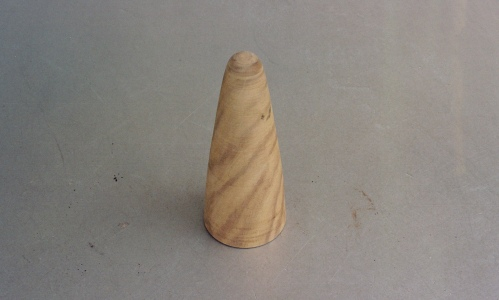
Wooden stake used for practice.

Unlike many internal martial arts, Ziranmen's early training focuses on hard physical exertion, with the internal aspects only becoming apparent to the practitioner later in training. The style contains over eighty extended forms and hundreds of short combination drills. Training to exhaustion in these methods forces the student to cease using muscular force and to move in a relaxed manner. The basic training routine is a static exercise which involves rotating the hands in sequence; Du Xinwu is said to have practiced this routine atop wooden stakes with weighted sandbags attached to his arms and legs, which enabled him to highly develop his qing gong ("light body technique"). Over time, the student's natural stepping movements develop into lower stances. Ziranmen emphasises the natural development of movement.

Practitioners also make use of pai da gong techniques, which involves striking and being struck by various pieces of equipment, including wooden posts, sandbags and iron balls. These practices are intended to strengthen the body and increase striking power. An item of equipment apparently unique to Zinranmen is the "pushing/striking cart", a wooden cart filled with stone which is moved by shoves and strikes.
