= Kunlunquan =

Chinese martial arts in Guangdong

Kunlunquan (昆仑拳, Kunlun Fist) is a style of Chinese martial arts popular in the province of Guangdong. As it is practiced by the minority Hakka it is considered a Kejiaquan. It was officially included among the styles nanquan, but originated in northern China. It was handed down in 1880 by Huang Huilong (黄辉龙) or Feilong Huang (黄飞龙), a native of Jinan in the province of Shandong. Shuangqing Huang, a practitioner of this style today, is considered sixty seventh generation, witness to what is considered ancient style.

According to legend, Kunlunquan's name was inspired by the Kunlun Mountains, the location where Kunlunquan was created by Quanzhen School of Taoism founder Wang Chongyang and his seven disciples. Writing in Landtai World: Early Years, Xinyang Normal University scholar Zhang Xiang said about Kunlunquan, "Its boxing characteristics are free and easy when defending, and deadly and fierce when attacking." According to the Guangdong Province Chronicle: Sports Chronicle, "The characteristics of Kunlunquan: Fierce, tricky, heaving, floating and sinking, every move is to attack the vital parts. The stakes are higher, exhale, and inhale."

== Taolu of Kunlunquan of Huang Huilong ==
- Empty hand forms: Sixiangquan (四象拳[3]); Wuxingquan (五行拳[4]); Erlongquan (二龙拳[5]); Liu Zhang Gong Panxuan (刘公盘旋掌[6]); Maziquan (马子拳[7]); Wushou Wuji (无极五手[8]); Bafazhang (八法掌[9]); Kuiwuquan (魁武拳[10]); Qishier Chui (七十二捶[11] ) Weishi Ba Guan (卫士坝关); Huimen Ba Da (回门八打), Bagua (八挂); Gun Shiba Da Jiu (九滚十八打); Ditang (地躺); Hu bao shuang xing (虎豹双刑); Xique Shuangzhi (喜鹊双枝); Erdu mei (二度梅) etc.
- Weapons Forms: Baihe dandao (白鹤单刀[12]); Qixing Taiyang Bagua jian [13]; Qiang (枪); dadao Chunqiu (春秋刀); bandeng (板凳) ji (戟); Gou qiang lian (勾镰枪), Tiao gun (条棍) etc.
- Paired exercises: Kongshou Duida (空手对打, fight a couple without weapons); Duangun Duida (短棍对打, fighting in tandem with the short stick); Shuangdao Duida (双刀对打, fighting in tandem with the double saber); gun dui bandeng (棍对板凳, stick on stool), etc.

== See also ==
- Kunlun Mountains
- Kunlun Sect

== Notes ==
1. ^ Yun Suifeng云随风, Chaoshan Wushu Shuo Lue潮汕武术说略
2. ^ Chaoshan Quanpai Shuo Duanxiang 潮汕拳派说端详, articolo pubblicato sulla rivista Zhonghua Wushu nei numeri 1 e 4 del 1998 ^ Chaoshan Quanpai Shuo Duanxiang潮汕拳派说端详, the journal Zhonghua Wushu in 1 and 4 of 1998
3. ^ in Cina è stata prodotta una serie di VCD tra cui Kunlunquan Xilie - Sixiangquan (昆仑拳系列-四象拳) dimostrato da Huang Shuangqing (黄双庆), edito dalla Renmin Tiyu Yinxiang Chubanshe nel 2007 a Guangzhou ^ China has produced a series of VCD including Kunlunquan Xilie - Sixiangquan (昆仑拳系列-四象拳) Shuangqing demonstrated by Huang (黄双庆), published by Renmin chubanshe Yinxiang Tiyu in 2007 in Guangzhou
4. ^ in Cina è stata prodotta una serie di VCD tra cui Kunlunquan Xilie - Wuxingquan (昆仑拳系列-五行拳) dimostrato da Huang Shuangqing (黄双庆), edito dalla Renmin Tiyu Yinxiang Chubanshe nel 2007 a Guangzhou ^ China has produced a series of VCD including Kunlunquan Xilie - Wuxingquan (昆仑拳系列-五行拳) Shuangqing demonstrated by Huang (黄双庆), published by Renmin chubanshe Yinxiang Tiyu in 2007 in Guangzhou
5. ^ in Cina è stata prodotta una serie di VCD tra cui Kunlunquan Xilie - Erlongquan (昆仑拳系列-二龙拳) dimostrato da Huang Shuangqing (黄双庆), edito dalla Renmin Tiyu Yinxiang Chubanshe nel 2007 a Guangzhou ^ China has produced a series of VCD including Kunlunquan Xilie - Erlongquan (昆仑拳系列-二龙拳) Shuangqing demonstrated by Huang (黄双庆), published by Renmin chubanshe Yinxiang Tiyu in 2007 in Guangzhou
6. ^ in Cina è stata prodotta una serie di VCD tra cui Kunlunquan Xilie - Liu Gong Panxuan Zhang (昆仑拳系列-刘公盘旋掌) dimostrato da Huang Shuangqing (黄双庆), edito dalla Renmin Tiyu Yinxiang Chubanshe nel 2007 a Guangzhou ^ China has produced a series of VCD including Kunlunquan Xilie - Liu Zhang Gong Panxuan (昆仑拳系列-刘公盘旋掌) Shuangqing demonstrated by Huang (黄双庆), published by Renmin chubanshe Yinxiang Tiyu in 2007 in Guangzhou
7. ^ in Cina è stata prodotta una serie di VCD tra cui Kunlunquan Xilie - Maziquan (昆仑拳系列-马子拳) dimostrato da Huang Shuangqing (黄双庆), edito dalla Renmin Tiyu Yinxiang Chubanshe nel 2007 a Guangzhou ^ China has produced a series of VCD including Kunlunquan Xilie - Maziquan (昆仑拳系列-马子拳) Shuangqing demonstrated by Huang (黄双庆), published by Renmin chubanshe Yinxiang Tiyu in 2007 in Guangzhou
8. ^ in Cina è stata prodotta una serie di VCD tra cui Kunlunquan Xilie – Wuji Wushou (昆仑拳系列-无极五手) dimostrato da Huang Shuangqing (黄双庆), edito dalla Renmin Tiyu Yinxiang Chubanshe nel 2007 a Guangzhou ^ China has produced a series of VCD including Kunlunquan Xilie - Wuji Wushou (昆仑拳系列-无极五手) Shuangqing demonstrated by Huang (黄双庆), published by Renmin chubanshe Yinxiang Tiyu in 2007 in Guangzhou
9. ^ in Cina è stata prodotta una serie di VCD tra cui Kunlunquan Xilie - Bafazhang (昆仑拳系列-八法掌) dimostrato da Huang Shuangqing (黄双庆), edito dalla Renmin Tiyu Yinxiang Chubanshe nel 2007 a Guangzhou ^ China has produced a series of VCD including Kunlunquan Xilie - Bafazhang (昆仑拳系列-八法掌) Shuangqing demonstrated by Huang (黄双庆), published by Renmin chubanshe Yinxiang Tiyu in 2007 in Guangzhou
10. ^ in Cina è stata prodotta una serie di VCD tra cui Kunlunquan Xilie - Kuiwuquan (昆仑拳系列-魁武拳) dimostrato da Huang Shuangqing (黄双庆), edito dalla Renmin Tiyu Yinxiang Chubanshe nel 2007 a Guangzhou ^ China has produced a series of VCD including Kunlunquan Xilie - Kuiwuquan (昆仑拳系列-魁武拳) Shuangqing demonstrated by Huang (黄双庆), published by Renmin chubanshe Yinxiang Tiyu in 2007 in Guangzhou
11. ^ in Cina è stata prodotta una serie di VCD tra cui Kunlunquan Xilie – Qishier Chui (昆仑拳系列-七十二捶) dimostrato da Huang Shuangqing (黄双庆), edito dalla Renmin Tiyu Yinxiang Chubanshe nel 2007 a Guangzhou ^ China has produced a series of VCD including Kunlunquan Xilie - Qishier Chui (昆仑拳系列-七十二捶) Shuangqing demonstrated by Huang (黄双庆), published by Renmin chubanshe Yinxiang Tiyu in 2007 in Guangzhou
12. ^ in Cina è stata prodotta una serie di VCD tra cui Kunlunquan Xilie – Baihe Dandao (昆仑拳系列-白鹤单刀) dimostrato da Huang Shuangqing (黄双庆), edito dalla Renmin Tiyu Yinxiang Chubanshe nel 2007 a Guangzhou ^ China has produced a series of VCD including Kunlunquan Xilie - Baihe Dandao (昆仑拳系列-白鹤单刀) Shuangqing demonstrated by Huang (黄双庆), published by Renmin chubanshe Yinxiang Tiyu in 2007 in Guangzhou
13. ^ in Cina è stata prodotta una serie di VCD tra cui Kunlunquan Xilie – Bagua Qixing Taiyang Jian (昆仑拳系列-八卦七星太阳剑) dimostrato da Huang Shuangqing (黄双庆), edito dalla Renmin Tiyu Yinxiang Chubanshe nel 2007 a Guangzhou ^ China has produced a series of VCD including Kunlunquan Xilie - Qixing Taiyang Bagua Jian (昆仑拳系列-八卦七星太阳剑) Shuangqing demonstrated by Huang (黄双庆), published by Renmin chubanshe Yinxiang Tiyu in 2007 in Guangzhou
