= Liu Baichuan =

Liu Baichuan (1870–1964) was a Chinese martial artist.

Liu was born in 1870 in Anhui. He studied martial arts from an early age with the Shaolin monk Yang Cheng. After passing the Imperial Military Examinations Liu became a security guard. He was employed for a time as a martial arts instructor at Huo Yuanjia's Chin Woo Athletic Association, and also taught at the Central Guoshu Institute in Nanking.

He used a form of Luohan boxing, excelling in the use of kicks, which led to his nickname "Number One Leg Sough of Yangzi". He died in 1964.
