= Northern Shaolin kung fu =

Chinese martial art discipline

Northern Shaolin (Chinese: 北少林; pinyin: Běishàolín; Cantonese Yale: Bak-siu-làhm; sometimes also Northern Shaolin Boxing School, Chinese: 北少林拳門; Cantonese Yale: Bak-siu-làhm Kyun-mun) are the martial arts of Northern China, in particular the styles from the Northern Shaolin Monastery in Henan. It is most associated with the style practiced by Gù Rǔzhāng (顧汝章 1894–1952; also known as Ku Yu-cheung), the Sōngshān Shí Lù Shàolínquán (嵩山十路少林拳) / Song Mountain Ten Road Shaolin Boxing. When the distinction is made, it is an "external" martial art (rather than an "internal" martial art).

== Northern styles ==
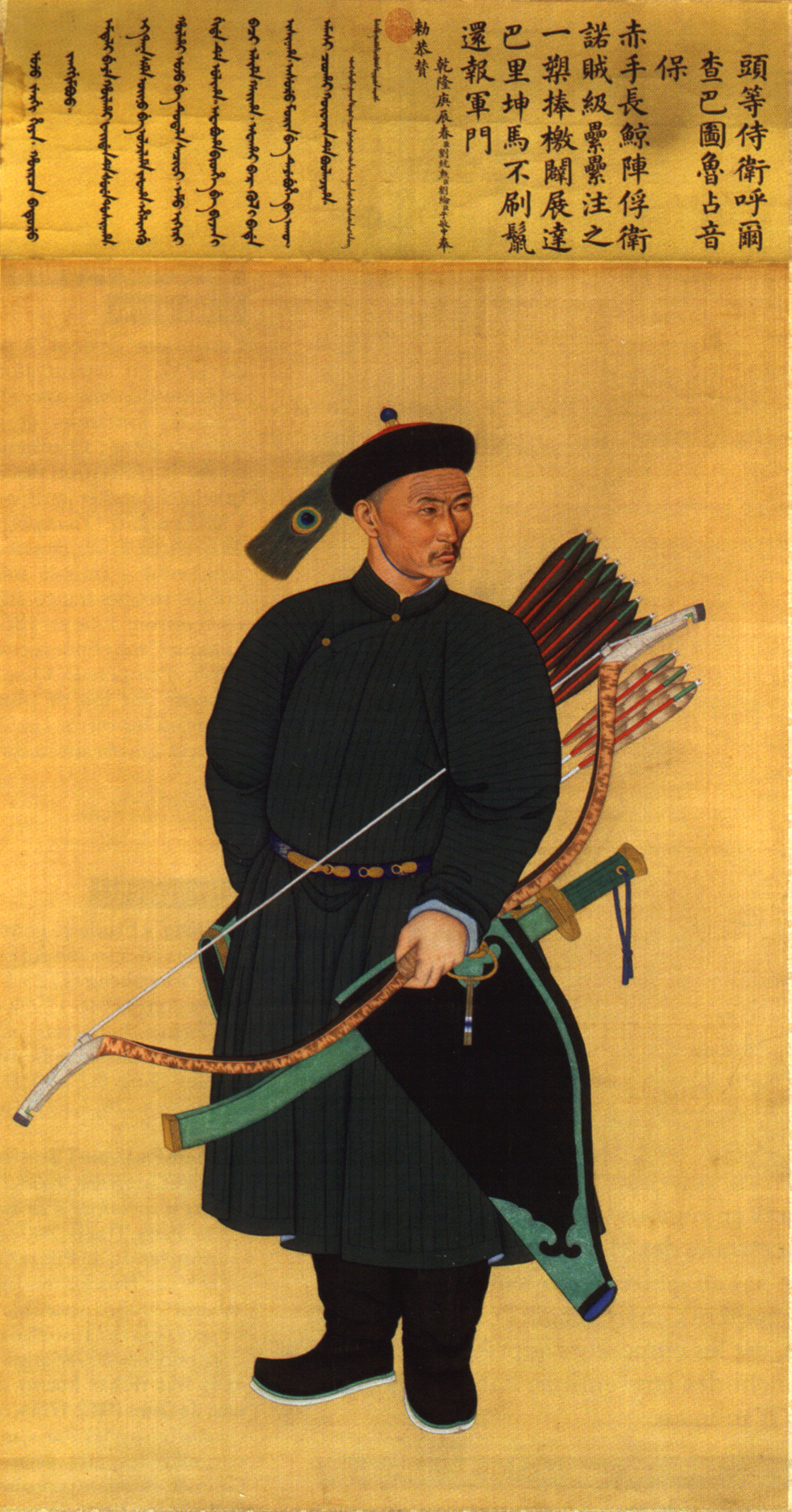
Manchu banner soldier, a caste of professional martial artists active in Chinese society as recently as a hundred years ago

Northern styles/Běi pài (北派) feature deeply extended postures—such as the horse, bow, drop, and dragon stances—connected by quick fluid transitions, able to quickly change the direction in which force is issued.

The group of Northern martial arts includes many illustrious styles such as Baguazhang, Bajiquan, Chāquán, Chuojiao, Eagle Claw, Mizongyi, Northern Praying Mantis and Taijiquan. Chángquán is often identified as the representative Northern style and forms a separate division in modern Wushu curriculum.

Northern styles exhibit a distinctively different flavor from the martial arts practiced in the South. In general, the training characteristics of northern styles put more focus on legwork, kicking and acrobatics. The influence of Northern styles can be found in traditional Korean martial arts and their emphasis on high-level kicks.

It has been suggested that the presence of high kicks and flying kicks found in Southern styles, in Okinawan martial arts, and hence in modern non-Chinese styles such as karate and taekwondo (and by extension modern kickboxing) are due to influence from northern styles during the first half of the 20th century.

== Characteristics ==
The Northern Shaolin style of kung fu is one of the most prominent traditional northern styles of Chinese martial arts. The northern styles of kung-fu generally emphasize long range techniques, quick advances and retreats, wide stances, kicking and leaping techniques, whirling circular blocks, quickness, agility, and aggressive attacks.

The system teaches empty-hand techniques and weaponry through predetermined combinations, known as forms, routines, or movement of sets. The students learn the basics by practicing the routines until the movements in the routines can be executed naturally based on instinct. Then, two or multiple main sets are practiced to train responses and applications of techniques learned from the sets. The practice sets/routines are not only practical in applications but are also graceful and artistic in nature. The fluidness of the movements combined with acrobatic techniques are trademarks of the Northern Shaolin sets.

The Northern Shaolin style was made famous by the late Gu Yu-jeung. Many legends tell of Gu's feats; according to tales related by his close students, Gu's father was an accomplished exponent of the Tan Tui ("springing leg") form. When he was young, Gu traveled throughout Northern China to learn all the northern kung fu systems. He was renowned for his Iron Palm techniques and the application of the long spear. He organized all his learnings into what is today's Northern Shaolin style.

== History ==
The monastery in Henan is the original Shaolin Monastery. The monks began to practice military weapons sometime around the Tang dynasty and became famous for aiding the future Emperor Li Shimin in struggles against rebellious forces. The monks were primarily known for their spear and staff techniques until the Ming–Qing transition when they began to specialize in unarmed combat. As the reputation of the Shaolin martial arts grew during the following centuries, its name became synonymous with martial arts, regardless of whether an individual art traced its origins to the Shaolin Monastery in Henan or not. As a result, the "Shaolin" moniker was applied to other Buddhist temples with strong reputations for martial arts. The characteristics of the martial arts taught at each temple were so different from each other that they became identified with their place of origin.

=== The Northern Shaolin Lineage ===
The Northern Shaolin (北少林 denotes the famous 河南崇山少林寺 Song Mountain Shaolin Temple, in Henan province) style associated with Gu Ruzhang was first taught to a lay disciple, the celebrated 18th century master Gan Fengchi of Jiangsu Province, by a Shaolin monk named Zhao Yuan, born Zhu Fu, a member of the Ming royal family who joined the sangha after the Ming was overthrown by the Qing in 1644. (Gan is also remembered for founding the martial art Huāquán 花拳, literally "flower fist", about which he wrote the book Introduction to Huāquán.) Gan in turn taught Wan Bangcai, who taught Yan Degong, who taught Yan Sansen, who taught Yan Jiwen, who taught his nephew Gu Ruzhang.

Generation 1–9

1. 朝元 和尚 (Monk Zhāo Yuán)
2. 甘鳳池 (Gān Fèngchí)
3. 萬邦才 (Wàn Bāngcái)
4. 嚴徳功 (Yán Dégōng)
5. 嚴三省 (Yán Sānxǐng)
6. 嚴機(繼)溫 (Yán Jīwēn)
7. 顧汝章 (Gù Rǔzhāng), 白志祥 (Bái Zhìxiáng)
8. 馬劍風 (Ma Jianfeng), 嚴尚武 (Yan Shangwu), 龍子祥 (Long Zixiang)
9. 黃澤民 (Wong Jack-man / Huáng Zémín), 陳國偉 (Chan Kwok-wai), 黎雄 (Lai Hung), 鄺榮林 (Kwong Wing-lam) and 蘇炳源 (Jonny So) – Among others

Yán Jīwēn also taught Gu the skills of Iron Body and Iron Palm. On a famous occasion in 1931, Gu is said to have demonstrated the latter on a horse.

Among the martial artists who gathered at the Central National Martial Arts Institute in Nanjing in 1928, Gu placed in the top fifteen and was included— alongside Fu Zhen-song, Li Xian-wu, Wan Lai-sheng, and Wong Shao-chou in the Five Southbound Tigers a.k.a. The Five Tigers From The North (五虎下江南, Pinyin Wǔhǔ Xià Jiāngnán; literally, "five tigers heading south of the great river"), five masters of the Northern Chinese martial arts sent to Guangzhou (Canton) to organize another National Martial Arts Institute. In Guangzhou, the name "Shaolin" 南少林寺福建省(refer to South Shaolin temple in Fukian province—being sub-temple from the Northern one) was already associated with Hung Gar and other styles, so the style (嵩山十路少林拳 Sōngshān Shí Lù Shàolínquán / Song Mountain Ten Road Shaolin Boxing) practiced by Gu Ruzhang came to be known in those days in southern China by the nickname Northern Shaolin.

== The Northern Shaolin curriculum of Gu Ruzhang (Ku Yu-cheung) ==
Translated Name	Chinese	Mandarin Pinyin	Cantonese Jyutping	Comments
Open the Gate	開門	Kāimén	Hoimun	Essential entry/basic skills.
Lead the Way	領路	Lǐnglù	Linglou	Lead the opponent around to his defeat.
Mount the Horse	坐馬	Zuòmǎ	Jomaa	Counter-attacks.
Pierce the Heart	穿心	Chuānxīn	Cyunsam	Attacks up the solar plexus.
Martial Skills	武藝	Wǔyì	Moungai	Combat techniques.
Short Strikes	短打	Duǎndǎ	Dyundaa	Close-encounter combinations.
Plum Blossom	梅花	Méihuā	Muifaa	Breaking an ambush.
Pull the Step	拔歩	Bábù	Batbou	Open-space fighting combinations.
Linked Chain	連環	Liánhuán	Linwaan	Chained multiple strikes.
Stance Techniques	式法	Shìfǎ	Sikfaat	The essence of the style.

Note that some heirs to Gu Ruzhang's tradition teach these routines in a different order, particularly those under the lineage of Chan Kowk Wai(陳國偉).

These are the 10 forms as standardized by Gu, comprising the core of the system, sometimes known as the Ten Classical Forms. They are standard in all of Gu's Northern Shaolin Kung Fu lineages. However, as mentioned above, they are sometimes taught or learned in differing orders. As with many different martial arts, from lineage to lineage, one may find slight differences in the way the movements are expressed.

Students learning this style usually do not only learn the 10 core forms however. There are often additional teachings such as introductory material (Lianbuquan, Gongliquan, Tan Tui), several traditional weapons forms, two-man forms qigong [including the famous Shaolin Golden Bell Qigong System], etc.
