= Heihuquan =

Chinese martial art

- 黑虎拳
- Also known as: Black Tiger Fist
- Country of origin: China (Five Dynasties and Ten Kingdoms period), Henan Province
- Creator: Wang Zhenyuan
- Parenthood: Northern Shaolin Kung Fu
- Olympic sport: No

Black Tiger Fist (Chinese: 黑虎拳; pinyin: Hēihǔquán) is a northern Chinese martial art originating in Henan Province.

== Origins ==
The style is believed to have originated sometime around the 10th century. The traditional lineage of the system begins with master Wang Zhenyuan in the late nineteenth-century; but the style was originally formed at the Shaolin Temple in Henan before being transferred to Wang.The style was then passed from Wang Zhenyuan to Wang Zijiu to Wang Zhixiao (1862–1948).

== Techniques ==
The Black Tiger style is characterised by its extensive footwork, acrobatic kicks, low, wide stances, and unique fist position (where the thumb is curled in the same manner as the other fingers, rather than wrapped around them).

The Black Tiger style's fighting mentality is to use these sweeps and kicks by acrobatic movements, with the purpose of overwhelming the opponent before they are able to attack.

The style places emphasis on developing physical power and focus on fitness, rather than on internal aspects. Iron palm training is central to this style.
