= Central Guoshu Institute =

The Central Guoshu Institute (simplified Chinese: 中央国术馆; traditional Chinese: 中央國術館; pinyin: Zhōngyāng Guóshù Guǎn; lit. 'Central Martial Arts Academy') was established in Nanjing by the Kuomintang government of the Republic of China in March 1928 for the propagation of Chinese martial arts, and was an important center of martial arts during the Nanjing decade. Guoshu (國術; romanized in Wade-Giles as Kuoshu) "national art" was the term for martial arts adopted by the Republic of China at the time. The institute was created by Zhang Zhijiang (张之江, 1882–1966) under the sponsorship of elite government officials such as Li Liejun and others. Along with the Jing Wu Athletic Association (established in 1910), the academy played a crucial role in the transmission of traditional Chinese martial arts into the 20th century.

In April 1928, The Institute held its first national martial arts competition in Beijing in the form of a highly competitive lei tai tournament. It was presided by General Zhang Zhijiang. This competition attracted 400 of the best martial artists in China.

In October 1928, the Central Guoshu Institute held another national examination in Nanjing. This event came to be regarded as one of the most significant historic gatherings of Chinese martial arts masters. The tournament was presided by generals Zhang Zhijiang, Li Liejun, and Li Jinglin, who separated the 600 participants into two categories: Shaolin and Wudang. After the first several days of competition, the fighting competitions had to be halted because many participants were severely injured. The final 12 contestants were not permitted to continue, with the public excuse being the fear more injury or a death. The winner was determined by a vote by the participants.

Many of the "Top 15" finishers went on to teach at the institute. The Fifteen athletes in particular that distinguished themselves: Zhu Guofu (朱国福), Gu Ruzhang (顾 汝 章), Wang Yunpeng (王云鹏), Zhang Changyi (张长义), Ma Yufu (马裕甫), Dou Laigeng (窦 来 庚), Yang Shiwen (杨士文), Zhang Yingzhen(张英振), Yang Fawu (杨 法 武), Wang Chengzhang (王成章), Zhu Guozhen (朱国桢), Zhang Weitong (张维 通), Zhu Guolu (朱国禄), Ma Chengzhi (马成智), Hu Jiong (胡 炯)

== Instructors ==
The original masters brought in to teach included Fu Zhensong, Wan Laisheng, Gu Ruzhang, and Li Jinglin.

Yang Chengfu was named the institute's head instructor of tai chi; Sun Lutang was named head instructor of Xingyiquan; and Fu Zhensong was named head instructor of Baguazhang.

In 1929, the governor of Guangdong invited some of the institute's masters (including some of those that had competed in the 1928 lei tai) to come south to establish a "Southern Kuoshu Institute". General Li Jinglin chose five masters to represent northern China: Baguazhang master Fu Zhensong; Shaolin Iron Palm master Gu Ruzhang; Six Harmony master Wan Laishen; Tan Tui master Li Shanwu; and Chaquan master, Wang Shaozhao. These men were known as the Wu hu xia jiangnan (五虎下江南 - "Five tigers heading south of Jiangnan"). In 1933, the institute again hosted the national competition. The rules said, "...if death occurs as a result of boxing injuries and fights, the coffin with a body of the deceased will be sent home."

== Standardized Martial Arts Curriculum ==
Empty Handed: xíng yì quán, tài jí quán, bā guà zhǎng, chá quán, xīn wǔ shù (Modern MA), lián bù quán (linking step fist), zá quán (mixed hybrid), xíng quán(line fist), duō jiǎo ( chuō jiǎo ), pī guà quán etc.,

Weapons: jiàn (sword), dāo (saber), gùn (staff), qiāng (spear), biān (whip) etc.

Conditioning: qì gōng, tiě shā shǒu (iron sand palm), hóng shā shǒu (red sand palm) etc.

Combat: Empty Handed: yǐ jí sàn dǎ (kickboxing), shuāi jiāo (wrestling) le quán jī (western boxing), rì běn pī cì shù (kendo) - Weapons: cháng bīng (long), duǎn bīng (short) etc. 。

== Guoshu Today ==
The center relocated several times during World War II and returned to Nanjing in 1946. It closed in 1948 due to lack of funding.

When the Kuomintang resettled on Taiwan many Guoshu Masters and students went with them.

Not until 1950 was the Guoshu Organization once again formed.

== Guoshu Organizations ==
Taiwan - (Headquarters) - ICKF - International Chinese Kuoshu Federation - http://www.ickf-kuoshu.org/

U.S.A - (Headquarters) - TWKSF -The World Kuo Shu Federation - Huang, Chien Liang - https://twksf.org/

== See also ==
- History of Chinese martial arts
- Modern history of East Asian martial arts
