= Gu Ruzhang =

Chinese martial artist (1894–1952)

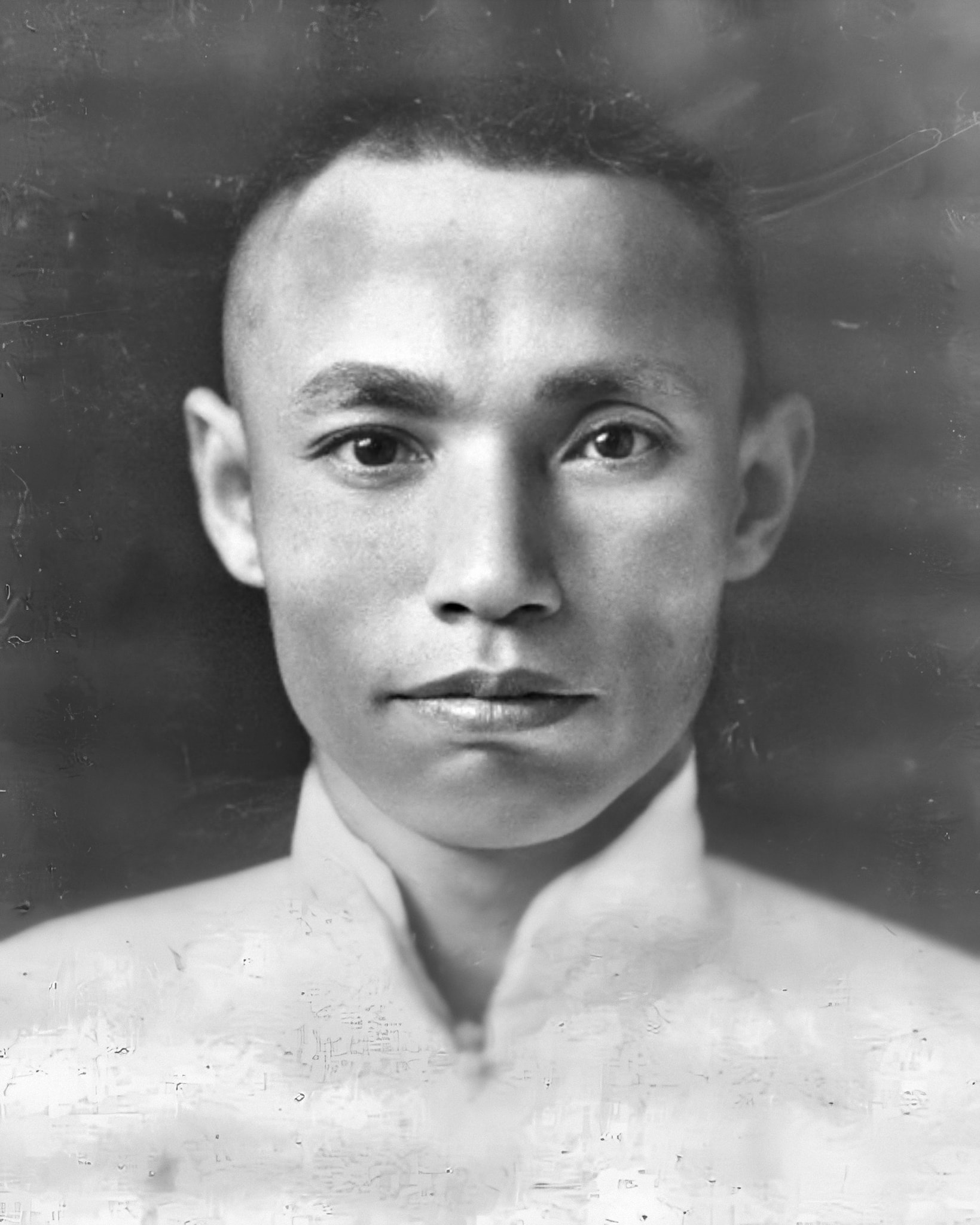
Profile Portrait of Ku Yu Cheung

Gu Ruzhang (Chinese: 顾汝章; pinyin: Gù Rǔzhāng; Cantonese Yale: Gu Yu-jeung; 1894–1952) was a Chinese martial artist who disseminated the Bak Siu Lum (Northern Shaolin) martial arts system across southern China in the early 20th century. Gu was known for his expertise in Iron Palm hand conditioning among other Chinese martial art training exercises. He became a legendary heroic figure in some Chinese martial arts communities.

Gu was a son of Gu Lizhi (顾利之), an adept of Tantui and Zhaquan and security and escort businessman (at the time, a common business for martial artists in China). Gu Ruzhang's father was friends with Yán Jīwēn (嚴機溫), and Gu inherited his Bei Shaolin style which included 10 empty-hand forms, several weapon forms, and martial qigong techniques such as Iron Palm, Iron Body, and Golden Bell. He was selected by the Central Guoshu Institute to teach Northern martial arts to the South as one of the "Five Southern Tigers".

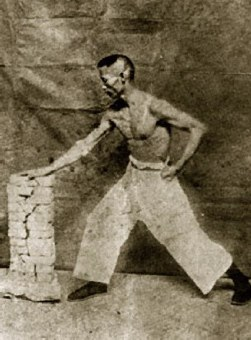
Gu photographed demonstrating his famous iron palm

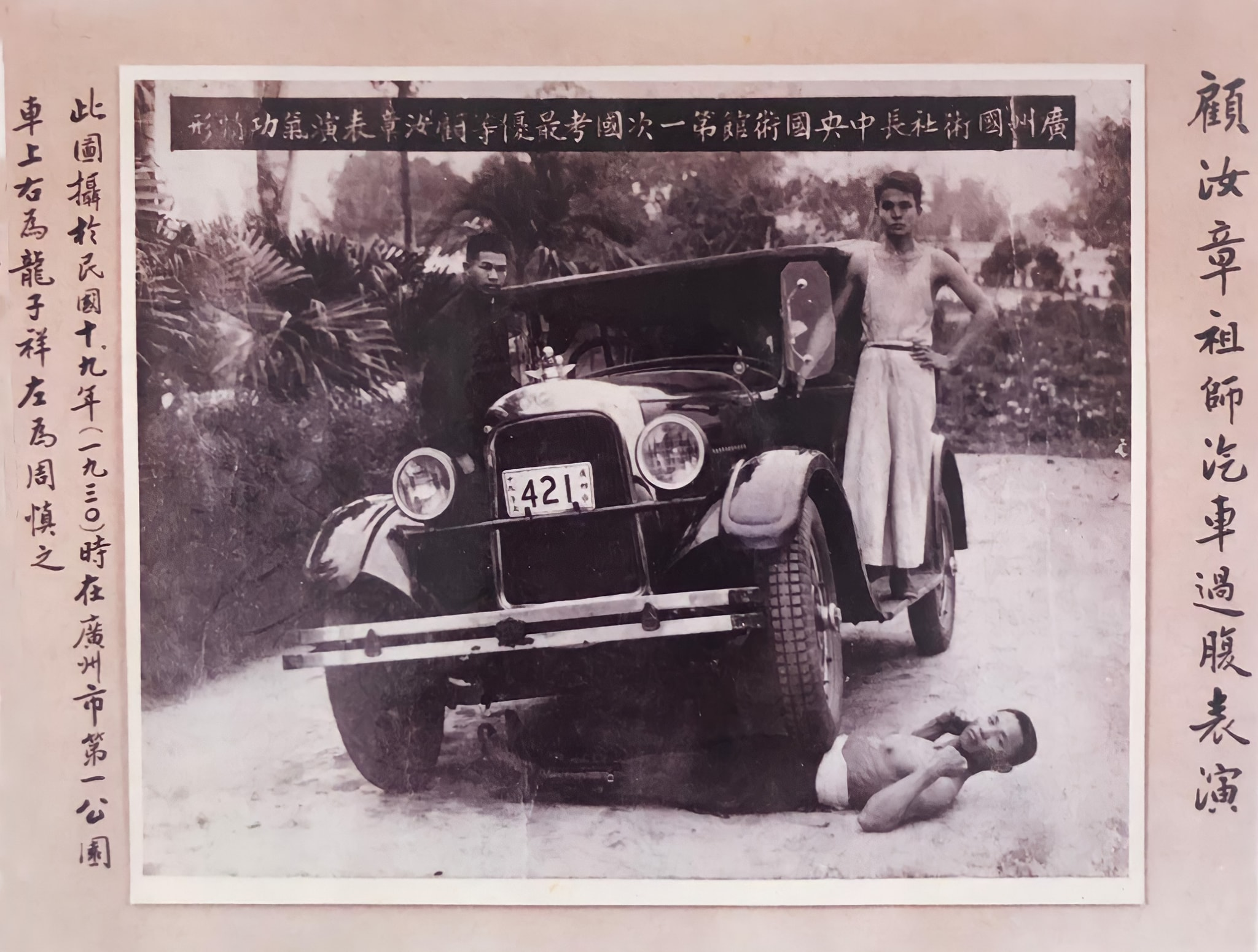
Gu demonstrating his famous Iron Shirt Technique with 2 people standing on a vehicle parked over his torso

Gu also learned Chaquan from Yú Zhènshēng (于振聲); Yang Taijiquan and Bajiquan from Li Jinglin (李景林); and Baguazhang, Xingyiquan from Sūn Lùtáng (孫祿堂).

He participated in the Nanjing 1928 First National Exam under the Central Guoshu Institute intended to seek out the greatest martial artists in China to promote national martial arts in China and placed in the top 15. There was no single winner as to prevent injury to the participants given the high skill level of the participants and the competition ended with 15 champions, where a few would become instructors at the Central Guoshu Institute.

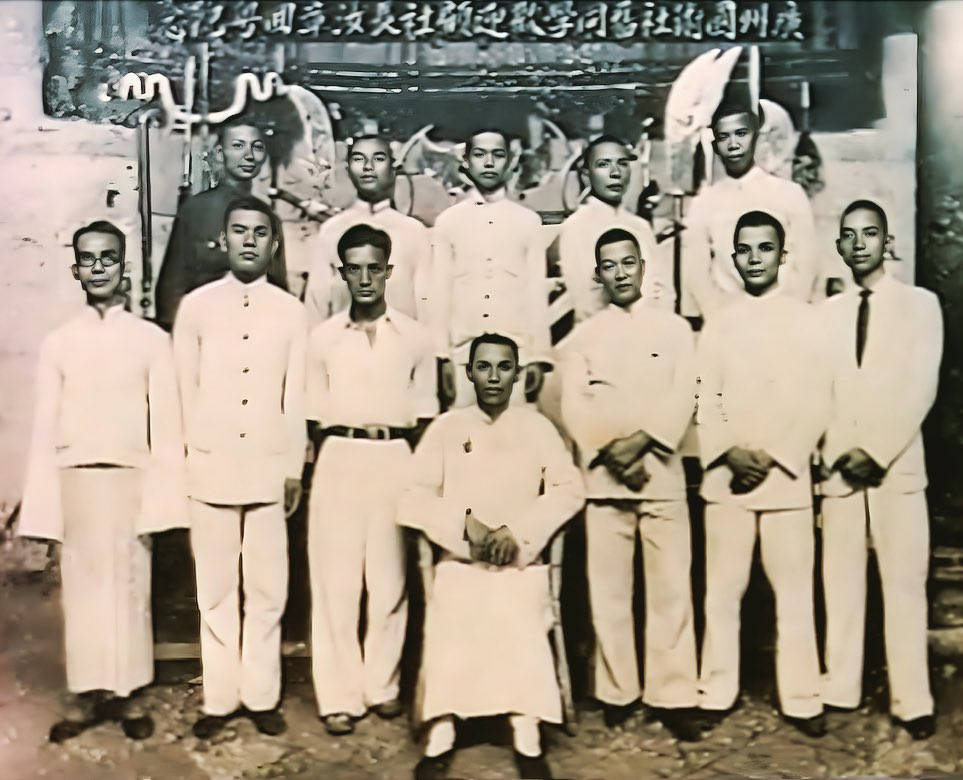
Ku Yu Cheung Seated in front centre, with his students. Photo has been enhanced

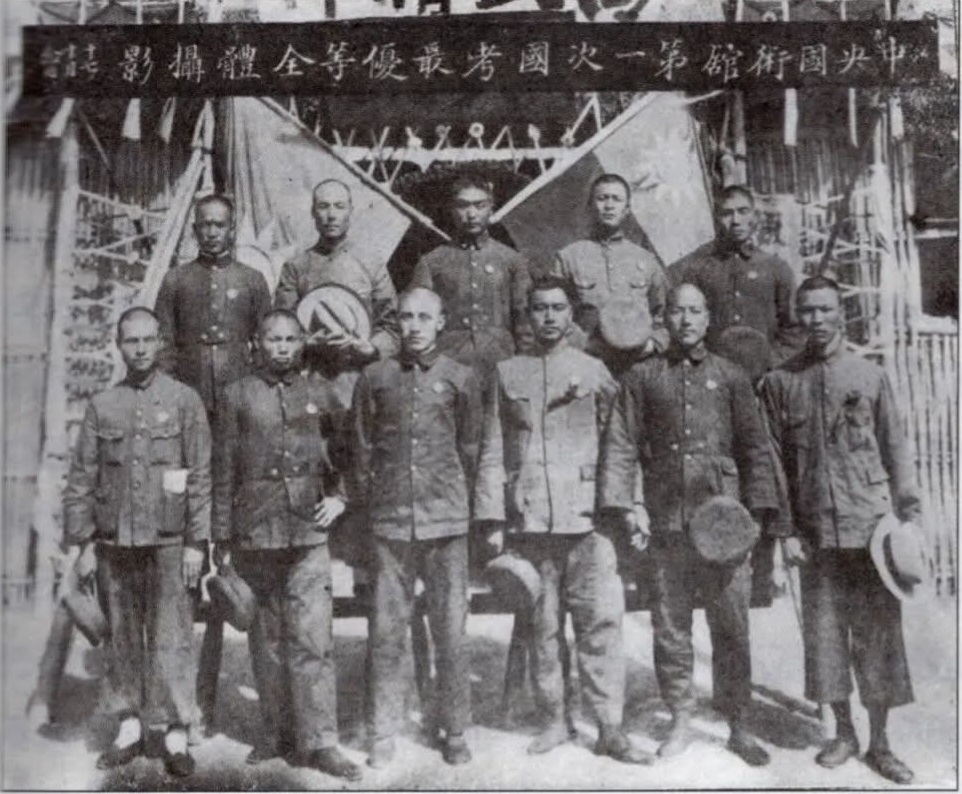
1928 Kuoshu 11 of the top 15 winners. Ku is front row with his left arm on his hip

== Exploits ==
Major events in Gu’s life are difficult to verify, as many of his achievements have been made legendary and may have been subject to gross exaggeration.

Gu was photographed breaking twelve un-spaced bricks with one strike. He entered the first National Wushu Fighting Examination and placed in the top 15 competitors. He was also an instructor for the Guangdong Armed Forces.

According to legend, Gu, in the same spirit as the folk hero Huo Yuanjia, defeated foreign fighters who viewed the Chinese martial arts as an inferior system of fighting.

Gu Ruzhang, using his iron palm skill, won back the fame of the Chinese against the disrespectful act of a Russian circus horse, who was made to kick everyone down from stage as these Chinese were attempting to win a bonus of making the horse lie down. Gu Ruzhang's iron palm struck the horse on its back, and it fell down with a severely damaged backbone and died the next morning. Gu Ruzhang told the Russian owner he was not taking any money from him.

== Later life ==
In the early 1940s Gu Ruzhang retired from the world of the martial arts disappearing from public view and living a private life. He is known to have died in 1952 at the age of 58, with a few students citing potential heart problems as the cause.
