= Luo Dexiu =

Taiwanese martial artist (born 1956)

羅德修 Luo Dexiu
- Luo Dexiu coming out of a turn in Xiantian Swallow Form of Baguazhang.
- Born: 1956 (age 69–70); Taipei, Taiwan
- Style: Xingyiquan, Gao Style Baguazhang; Cheng Style Baguazhang

Luo Dexiu or Lo Te-Hsiu (simplified Chinese: 罗德修; traditional Chinese: 羅德修; pinyin: Luó Déxiū) is a Taiwanese martial artist who specializes in the internal Chinese styles of Xingyiquan, Baguazhang, and Taijiquan.

He was born in 1956 (25th day, 11th month of the lunar calendar, which he follows for his birthdate) in Taipei, Taiwan.

Luo Dexiu entered the Tang Shou Tao (唐手道) school of Hong Yixiang (洪懿祥) in 1971, where he began his study of the Internal Martial Arts, devoting himself in the beginning to the use of these arts for fighting, with particular emphasis on Xingyiquan. He became one of Hong Yixiang's best fighters (Pa Kua Chang Journal, 1993).

He later became deeply interested in Baguazhang, which was at the core of the skills taught by Hong Yixiang, having been passed directly from Zhang Junfeng (張俊峰), who trained under Gao Yisheng (高義盛), a master in the Cheng Tinghua (程廷華) branch of Baguazhang. Zhang Junfeng had brought the Gao style of Baguazhang to Taiwan. This lineage and school is called Yizong. Luo Dexiu studied Gao style Baguazhang with Hong Yixiang, and with many of Zhang's other students as well, including Hong Yixiang's brothers Hong Yiwen (洪懿文) and Hong Yimian (洪懿棉). He later continued his intensive studies of Baguazhang with Liu Qian, an early student of Sun Xikun.

Luo Dexiu currently teaches Gao style Baguazhang and Hebei Xingyiquan, carrying on the Yizong tradition through his classes in Taipei, Taiwan, and holds seminar tours annually throughout Europe, America, and the Middle East.
