= Xingyiquan =

Chinese martial art

Xingyiquan 形意拳
- Focus: Internal mechanics (neijia), Striking, Takedowns
- Hardness: Both hard and soft, depending on application
- Country of origin: China
- Creator: Yue Fei, circa 12th century (attributed as the legendary founder). Li Luoneng, 19th century (founder of modern xingyiquan).
- Famous practitioners: See under Famous practitioners
- Parenthood: The historical origins of this martial art are disputed (see Lineage chart) and remain unclear. Modern xingyi originated from Dai Clan's liuhe xinyiquan, was heavily influenced by military spear techniques, and was possibly also affected and shaped by other styles as well.
- Olympic sport: No

Xingyiquan
- Chinese: 形意拳
- Literal meaning: form-thought-fist
Transcriptions
Standard Mandarin
- Hanyu Pinyin: Xíngyìquán
- Bopomofo: ㄒㄧㄥˊ ㄧˋ ㄑㄩㄢˊ
- Wade–Giles: Hsing^{2}-i^{4}-ch‘üan^{2}
- IPA: [ɕǐŋ.î.tɕʰɥɛ̌n]
Yue: Cantonese
- Yale Romanization: Yìhngyikyùhn
- Jyutping: jing4 ji3 kyun4
- IPA: [jɪŋ˩.ji˧.kʰyn˩]

Xingyiquan (Chinese: 形意拳; pinyin: xíngyìquán), (Note: The name is pronounced Sheeng E Chwen? in English. The word "quan" has a tone that sounds like one is asking a question.) also known as xingyi (Chinese: 形意; pinyin: xíngyì), is a style of internal Chinese martial arts. The word approximately translates to "Form-Intention Fist", or "Shape-Will Fist".

The style is characterized by aggressive, seemingly linear movements, and explosive power most often applied from a short range. A practitioner of xingyi uses coordinated movements to generate bursts of power intended to overwhelm the opponent, simultaneously attacking and defending. Methods vary from school to school but always include bare-handed fighting (mostly in single movements/combinations and sometimes in forms) and using weapons with similar body mechanics to those in bare-handed intense fighting. Movement and body mechanics in the art were heavily influenced by the practice of using staves and spears.

Historically and technically related martial arts include Dai-style xinyi liuhequan, liuhe xinyiquan, and yiquan.

== Origins ==
=== Legends ===
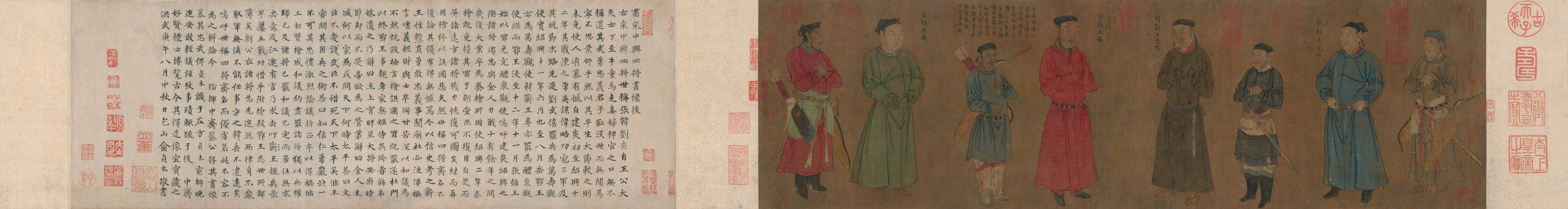
The "Four Generals of Zhongxing" painted by Liu Songnian during the Southern Song dynasty. Yue Fei is the second person from the left. This portrait is believed to be the "truest portrait of Yue in all extant materials."

The earliest written records of xingyi can be traced to the 18th century, and are attributed to Ma Xueli of Henan Province and Dai Longbang of Shanxi Province. Legend credits the creation of xingyi to renowned Song dynasty (960–1279 AD) general Yue Fei, but this is disputed.

According to the book Henan Orthodox Xingyiquan written by Pei Xirong (裴錫榮) and Li Ying'ang (李英昂):

[Dai Longbang] wrote the Preface to Six Harmonies Boxing in the 15th reign year of the Qianlong Emperor [1750]. Inside it says, '...when Yue Fei was a child, he received special instructions from Zhou Tong. Extremely skilled in spearfighting, he used the spear to create fist techniques and established a skill called Yiquan' (意拳). Meticulous and unfathomable, this technique far outstripped ancient ones.

According to legend, throughout the Jin, Yuan, and Ming dynasties few individuals studied this art, one of them being Ji Gong (also known as Ji Longfeng or Ji Jike) of Shanxi province. After Yue Fei's death, the art was lost for half a millennium. Then, during the Ming and Qing dynasties in Shaanxi province's Zhongnan Mountains, Yue Fei's boxing manual was said to have been discovered by Ji Gong.

=== General history (ancient times – 20th century) ===
Aspects of xingyiquan (particularly the animal styles) are identifiable as far back as the Liang dynasty at the Shaolin Temple. Yue Fei therefore did not, strictly speaking, invent xingyiquan, but synthesized and perfected existing Shaolin principles into his own style of gongfu which he popularized during his military service. Nonetheless, Yue Fei is usually identified as the creator because of his considerable understanding of the art (as shown in the work The Ten Theses of Xingyiquan, credited to Yue) and his cultural status as a Chinese war hero.

Some martial artists and Chinese martial art historians hold that Yue's story is largely legendary. While xingyiquan may well have evolved from military spear techniques, there is no supporting evidence to show that Yue Fei was involved or that the art dates to the Song dynasty. These authors point out that the works attributed to Yue Fei long postdate his life, some being as recent as the Republican era, and that it was common practice in China to attribute new works to a famous or legendary person, rather than take credit for oneself. In addition, historical memoirs and scholarly research papers only mention Zhou Tong teaching Yue archery and not spear play. Yue historically learned spear play from Chen Guang (陳廣), who was hired by the boy's paternal grandfather, Yao Daweng (姚大翁).

Beginning in the late Ming era, the evidence for the art's history grows clearer. Ji Longfeng, also known as Ji Jike, is the first person generally agreed to have both existed and practiced the art. Ji Longfeng's contributions to the art are described in the Ji Clan Chronicles (姬氏族譜; pinyin: Ji Shi Zupu). The Chronicles describe xingyiquan as a martial art based on the combat principles of the spear. The Chronicles attribute this stylistic influence to Ji himself, who was known as the "Divine Spear" (神槍; pinyin: Shén Qiāng) for his extraordinary skill with the weapon. Nowadays, many believe that the style Ji Longfeng was taught had been Shaolin Xinyiba (a style which still exists today, and bears some resemblance to xinyi liuhequan). Ji Longfeng referred to his art as liuhe, The Six Harmonies, a reference to the most highly developed spear style practiced in the late Ming military.

Li Luoneng was proficient in other martial arts before studying Dai-style Xinyi. Some claim his original art was qimenquan (奇門拳), perhaps his family's style, while others believe he actually studied tongbeiquan and gongliquan. Li came to study under the Dai family either because he heard of their fame in the martial arts and business, or maybe as suggested by others, after having fought and lost to a practitioner of their art. It is generally agreed that he then settled in the area of their village, and grew and sold vegetables, which earned him the nickname "Li Laonong" (李老農, literally "Old Farmer Li", but with the connotation of "Respectable Farmer Li"). Initially, members of the Dai clan refused to teach him, but he eventually won over their trust, and he was taught by Dai Wenxiong, Guo Weihan, or both. After learning Dai-style Xinyi for a number of years, perhaps over a decade, Li left the Dai territories and traveled across Shanxi and Hebei provinces, teaching for many years his own elaboration on the art, now called "xingyiquan". No reasons were ever recorded for the many changes Li made to the art, but there are those who claim that Li wished to compete with the Dai clan's fame, perhaps because of some grudge. Li and many of his students and grand-students were famous for offering bodyguard and caravan escort services.

=== Recent history (20th and 21st centuries) ===
A condensed version of xingyiquan was taught to Chinese officers at the Military Academy at Nanjing during the Second Sino-Japanese War for close quarters combat. This included armed techniques – such as bayonet and sabre drills – alongside unarmed techniques.

Sun Lutang became famous in the early 20th century for his skills (chiefly in the Beijing and Tianjin areas), and for the martial books he wrote about the Internal arts. During Sun Lutang's lifetime and martial career, he and several of his contemporaries began to classify xingyi, together with tai chi and baguazhang, as the "Wudang" style of martial arts. Sun also exchanged knowledge with his friend and colleague Fu Zhensong, who subsequently took this branch of the art to southern China (after centuries of it mostly being practiced in the northern parts of the country). Later, many others have spread the art across China and the world. Yiquan, which descended from xingyiquan by Wang Xiangzhai, became especially widespread during the 20th century, in China and across the world.

Following the Cultural Revolution in China, some xingyi forms have been adapted to fit the needs of modern practitioners of the competitive sport of wushu. This meant that various movement forms from the art were adapted to a competitive format, in which the emphasis was put on aesthetics and flowery movements, rather than on fighting. The style is nonetheless relatively rare in wushu competitions because all wushu practitioners must compete in several mandatory events, which make xingyi, a non-mandatory art, a secondary priority in wushu competitive circles.

As there has never been a single organizational body governing the teaching of the art, several variant styles and sub-styles developed. Although there are classical texts which include specific instructions and general guidelines for practice, many of these are ignored by most modern practitioners, and interpreted in different ways by those who follow their instruction (this is depicted in the lineage chart further down this page). As a result, over the decades and especially over the last few dozen years, branches of the art have become considerably different as they diverged. This trend was strengthened by the influence of other martial arts and the spread of xingyi to the Western World.

The art began to be taught in the West somewhere along the 1960s–1970s. However, it only rose to prominence among martial arts communities worldwide during the first decade of the 21st century. Currently, it is still not well known among the general public. One explanation for this is that unlike other traditional oriental martial arts, xingyi was not a notable style in movies which became popular in the West (and though a modified 'wushu' version of it appeared in The One, starring Jet Li, this was not told to the viewers as part of the film itself).

Arguably, the most common xingyiquan lineage in the West today is the yizong branch, which came down from Zhang Junfeng. Many of Zhang's students and grand-students, such as Kenneth Fish (martial artist), Hung I-Hsiang, Su Dongchen, Luo Dexiu, Hsu Hung-chi and others have taught his xingyi to Westerners since the 1980s – especially Americans. This branch became the most popular because Taiwan was open to Westerners during the 20th century, while throughout much of that century, the People's Republic of China did not allow Westerners to visit regularly, and thus people were not exposed to branches of the art from the mainland. Contrary to popular belief, spread by some Taiwanese teachers, the art had not 'died out' on the mainland, but was simply inaccessible to outsiders for several decades. Another popular Taiwanese branch in the West is Wang Shujin's lineage, which was chiefly transmitted by his student Wang Fulai.

There are also several lineages from Tianjin which are nowadays taught in the West, namely in Canada and Israel. Lines of Dai-style xingyi and xingyi liuhe are still rare in the West, and can be said to even be relatively rare in China, though they are not at risk of becoming 'extinct'. In the United States, Dai-style xingyi is taught by Li Tailiang and several of his students. Yiquan, on the other hand, has become exceedingly popular in the West, being taught in many schools, especially in Europe. There are no statistics as to the number of practitioners in any of these arts in either China or other countries.

=== Disputed history ===
Ancient Chinese texts, like those which make up the "Xingyi Classics", often contain characters whose meanings are obscure or have disappeared completely from the Chinese language. Specialized terms which describe historically specific concepts (e.g. names of ancient weapons) are commonly interpreted with reference to their closest, modern linguistic equivalent. The results can be problematic, producing translations which are linguistically correct but inconsistent within a fighting or martial context.

The recognized founder of baguazhang, Dong Haichuan, was reputed to have fought Guo Yunshen with neither able to defeat the other – though it is possible that they were training together. It would have been controversial at the time for Dong Haichuan to have studied under Guo Yunshen, since Dong was the older of the two. The most neutral viewpoint would be to say that they trained together, which may explain the stylistic similarities between baguazhang and the xingyiquan monkey shape. Frantzis argues that this encounter never took place and that Guo and Dong had little contact with each other. Frantzis argues that a xingyi-bagua exchange was more likely to have occurred in Tianjin c. 1900 where xingyi masters Li Cunyi and Zhang Zhaodong, bagua master Cheng Tinghua, and four other xingyi and bagua teachers lived together (Frantzis, 1998, p. 179). Sun Lutang states in his autobiography that the legendary fight between Guo Yunshen and Dong Haichuan never happened. The book states that the truth of the matter is that Guo Yunshen actually fought one of his older xingyi brothers and lost. Sun Lutang was a student of both Guo Yunshen and Cheng Tinghua so this understanding on the subject seems to be one of the most accurate.

Treating the story of Dong Haichuan and Guo Yunshen as allegory, however, reveals a common training protocol among xingyiquan and baguazhang practitioners. Often, because baguazhang requires significantly more time for a practitioner's skill to mature, it is acceptable to learn xingyiquan first or simultaneously. Such a practitioner develops a tactical vocabulary that is more readily apparent than the core baguazhang movements.

Another debated question in this regard is the identity of the teacher of Li Luoneng, the founder of modern xingyiquan. It is known that Li studied with the Dai clan, but remains unclear who taught him. Some people and lineages have traditionally claimed that he was taught by master Dai Longbang. However, many others point to the fact that Longbang died before Luoneng was born, or when Luoneng was quite young. Combined with the fact that Luoneng only arrived at Dai territory as a traveling adult, others argue that it would have been impossible for him to have studied under Longbang, and suggest his teacher was actually Longbang's student, Guo Weihan.

Another historical controversy relates to the identity of the teacher of the founder of yiquan, late master Wang Xiangzhai (~1886–1963). Most yiquan oral traditions have it that Guo Yunshen, a student of the founder of modern xingyi (Li Luoneng), had been Wang Xiangzhai's teacher. However, since Wang was not yet alive (or was a young child) at the time of Guo Yunshen's death, others suggest he must have learnt from Guo's other disciples (Li Bao 李豹 is thought to have been his true main teacher). The chart below lists Li Bao as Wang's teacher, and Guo Yunshen as an indirect teacher due to the controversy surrounding the matter (until further historical evidence surfaces).

== Branches ==
After Cao Jiwu, the art split into two branches:

- Ma-style xinyi liuhequan.
- Dai-style liuhe xinyiquan.

These two branches survive to this day. Later, Li Luoneng developed xingyiquan out of the Dai family branch. From Li Luoneng's time onward, the art has been said to have three main developmental branches:

- Shanxi (including the Song- and Che-family sub-branches)
- Hebei (Most commonly practiced xingyiquan, and the branch yiquan evolved from)
- Henan (an alternative name for Ma-style xinyi liuhequan)

However, the identification of three separate branches is tenuous because of the extensive cross-training that occurred across the different lineages of the art. This suggests that the branches did not evolve in isolation, diluting any major differences between them.

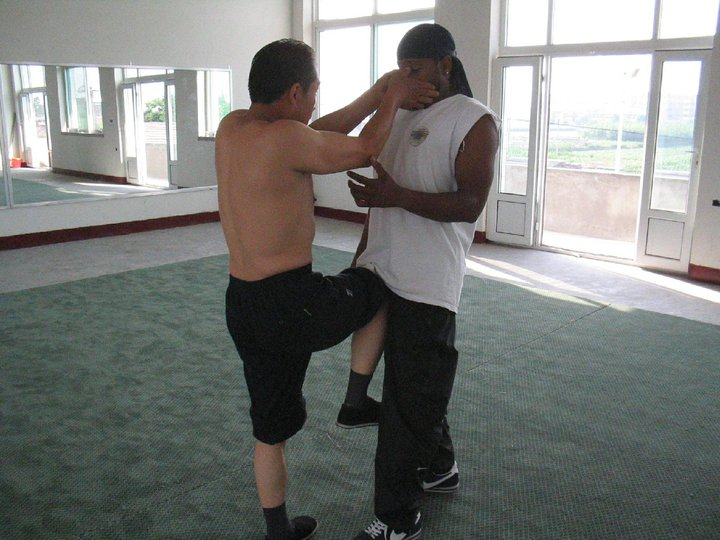
Master Yang Fansheng (1949–2014) demonstrating the technique 'Ying Zhua' (Eagle Grasp) from the Si Ba Chui form. The style being demonstrated is Dai-style xinyi liuhequan, the precursor to modern xingyi. Shot at the International Xinyi-Dao Federation headquarters, Taigu County, Shanxi province, China. Year 2004. The student being demonstrated upon is late master Yang's disciple, Sudan Jeffers.

Schools of the Shanxi branch have a narrower stance, lighter footwork and tend to be more evasive. They emphasize the development of relaxation before the practice of intention (yi). Schools of the Hebei branch emphasize xing and yi before developing a higher level of relaxed structure, and have a slightly different evasive footwork. Schools of the Henan branch are typically the most aggressive of the three.

The Henan branch is known as the Muslim branch because it was handed down within the Muslim community in Luoyang to which its founder, Ma Xueli, belonged. The Henan branch is sometimes referred to by practitioners as xinyiliuhequan instead of simply xingyiquan, as per the general preference of those who formally teach the art.

The general Henan branch, xinyiliuhequan (Chinese: 心意六合拳) - often also anglicized as xinyi liuhe quan - means "heart-intention six harmonies fist." Though it is often called "Henan style xingyiquan" due to its and xingyiquan's ancestral origin in Ji Jike, xinyiliuhequan is an individual style in its own right. It is, in fact, the ancestral art of both Dai clan xinyiquan and modern xingyiquan, making it, arguably, the style from which the entire xingyi lineage springs - though such is debatable. Xinyiliuhequan as we know it originated with Ma Xueli, who, along with Cao Jiwu, constituted Ji Jike's two top indoor disciples.

Xinyiliuhequan's general lineage is as follows: Ji Jike (Longfeng)--Ma Xueli--Ma San Yuan--Zhang Zhicheng--Li Zheng--Zhang Zhu--Zhang Longe'er--Ma Zhuangdu--An Daqing--Bao Xianating.

Naturally, there are many others within the xinyiliuhequan lineage, yet most of the verifiable schools trace their common roots to tenth generation lineage holder, Bao Xianting, making him an appropriate endpoint for a basic overview of xinyiliuhequan's lineage. Because of its guarded secrecy within the Hui Muslim community - which forms the majority of the xinyiliuhequan schools all the way back to Ma Xueli - information on the style's lineage tree as a whole is more difficult to obtain than the lineage charts of its cousin art, xingyiquan. What is known is that xinyiliuhequan is plausibly closer to the original art that Ji Jike developed than any of the others within the xingyi family because of its being guarded within tight Hui Muslim circles from Ji Jike onward for over two centuries, undergoing few changes to its core curriculum during that 200 year period.

Unlike the Hebei and Shanxi branches of xingyiquan, which are based on the five elements and twelve animals, the core of xinyiliuhequan is based on the four seizing hammers (Chinese: 四把錘) - also known as the four fists - and - the ten big forms (Chinese: 十大形), also known as the ten animals, i.e.:

THE FOUR FISTS 四把錘:

(1) Tilting/Picking 挑领把

(2) Eagle Catch 鹰捉把

(3) Horizontal 横拳把

(4) Cutting 斩手把

THE TEN BIG FORMS (10 ANIMALS) 十大形: (1) Dragon (2) Tiger (3) Monkey (4) Horse (5) Chicken (6) Swallow (7) Snake (8) Sparrowhawk (9) Eagle (10) Bear

Xinyiliuhequan is not to be confused with the separate internal art liuhebafa.

Though xinyiliuhequan has been presumably consistent in content from Ma Xueli onwards, due to the historical complexity and vagueness of the lineages, it is uncertain which branch would constitute the "authentic" xingyiquan. What is absolutely certain is that finding a qualified lineage-holding teacher within the xinyiliuhequan system who's willing to teach an outsider is profoundly difficult. The Hebei style of xingyiquan is by far the most publicly available, while the Shanxi branches, such as the Song or Che styles, are comparatively rarer yet often more directly accessible than xinyiliuhequan tutelage.

The following sections discuss the art of xingyiquan that as descended from Li Luoneng. These sections are not representative of Dai-style xinyiquan or xinyiliuhequan.

== Characteristics and principles ==
Xingyiquan features aggressive shocking attacks and direct footwork. Most of the training and footwork is practiced on straight lines, but occurs on all planes of movement. The linear nature of training in the art hints at both the military origins and the influence of spear technique. The goal of the xingyi practitioner is to reach the opponent quickly and drive power through them in a single burst, to close in and make it so that the opponent can neither attack nor defend. The fighter utilizes tight circles, usually in a forward direction, but can fight using all 6 directions of energy (forward, backward, left, right, up, and down). Issuing explosive power in xingyi is referred to as fa jin, the same term used in many other traditional Chinese Martial Arts.

Despite its hard, angular appearance, cultivating "soft" internal strength is essential to achieving power in xingyiquan. The advanced practitioner always contains their movements to tight spirals, so even the seemingly direct and linear movements are circular on a very small scale. Such circles and spirals also exist in other martial arts, but xingyi (like Southern Praying Mantis) tends to keep them smaller than others.

Efficiency and economy of movement are the qualities of a xingyi stylist, and the style's direct fighting philosophy advocates simultaneous attack and defense. According to current practitioners, there are few kicks except for extremely low foot kicks (which avoids the hazards of balance involved with higher kicks) and some mid-level kicks, and these techniques are prized for their working within key principles rather than aesthetic value.

Xingyiquan favors a training stance called santishi (simplified Chinese: 三体势; traditional Chinese: 三體勢; pinyin: Sāntǐshì), literally "three bodies power," referring to how the stance holds the head, torso and feet along the same vertical plane (As a Zhan zhuang method, this stance is trained lower). In actual fighting, a free-form traditional guard should be used in the application of intent (yi) rather than adhering to any aesthetic value, in training santishi is more often trained at middle-low heights.

Like other Internal Arts, much of the training in xingyiquan is done in slow-motion. This is true for almost all the movements in the art, though the majority of them can and are also trained explosively.

== Overview of the art and its training methods ==
=== Zhan zhuang ===
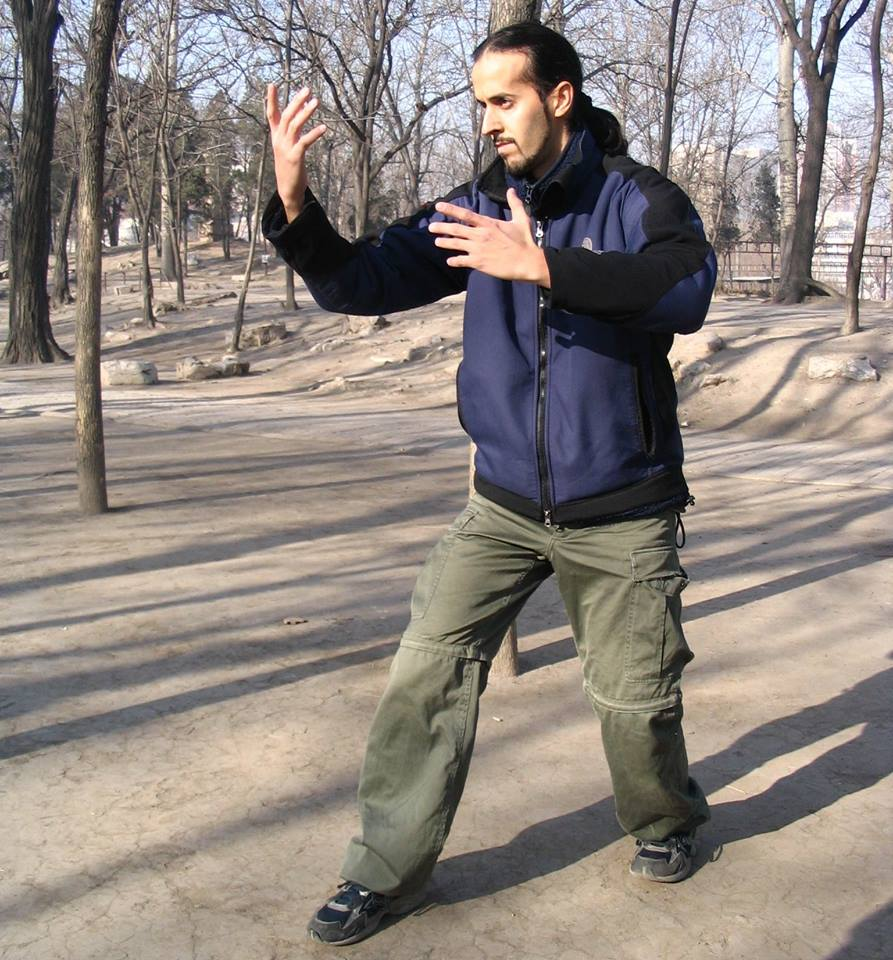
Shifu Nitzan Oren, demonstrating a zhan zhuang posture which combines the santishi stance and a hunyuan hand variation

Zhan zhuang is a general name given to postures which one holds in place for prolonged periods of time – anywhere between 2 minutes and 2 hours. These postures are related to postures used in actual fighting, and are sometimes identical to them. Initially, these postures are taught as static training stances. After a short amount of time though, the practitioner would be taught how to move the muscles and connective tissues on a minute level from the inside of the body, making these stances very dynamic internally and more challenging to train. The most common zhan zhuang among all xingyi schools is santishi (it is the stance demonstrated by Sun Lutang in the picture at the beginning of the article). Other common stances are: hunyuan zhuang, wuji zhuang, fuhu zhuang, xianglong zhuang and their many variants. There are many reasons for training zhan zhuang. Among them are, in general:

- It is the simplest method to work on the training of one's Intent (yi).
- They are used to develop one's martial structure.
- One can learn the bodily alignments of the art and perfect them in a more relaxed state.
- Correct breathing can be trained more methodically while holding zhan zhuang.
- There are certain health benefits involved in such training.

Some teachers consider zhan zhuang to be the most important practice in xingyi; whereas others opt to not train or teach them at all. The use of the santishi zhan zhuang as the main training method in xingyi dates back to Li Luoneng, the founder of modern version of the art. In Dai-style xinyi, the central and most important training method is called 'Squatting Monkey' – a dynamic movement exercise rather than a static posture held in place. In the Geng Jishan/Deng Yunfeng/Rose Li tradition, the phrase santi in santishi is sometimes replaced by "central equilibrium stance".

Since the 1980s, zhan zhuang has become more and more popular in other martial arts; many of which, such as some schools of Chen-style tai chi, borrowed these methods from xingyi schools. Other martial arts sometimes had their own zhan zhuang methods beforehand. Today, the posture hunyuan zhuang in particular has become a mainstay of many styles; its spread probably owing to the growing popularity of yiquan.

=== Plow stepping ===
Also called 'friction stepping' (摩擦步; mócā bù), this exercise is meant to ingrain in the practitioner the correct forward-stepping habits and methods of xingyi, which are different from those of other arts (though similar to those found in some styles of baguazhang). Plow stepping is a precursor to xingyi's 'Chicken Stepping', which is the faster and more explosive stepping method in the art. In yiquan, plow stepping had been replaced with 'mud stepping'.

=== Shi Li/Mo Jin ===
In many lineages, there is an intermittent stage between the stationary zhan zhuang and the more complex Five Elements (though this stage might also be taught following the Five Elements). The two names above are interchangeable for a few exercises developed to fulfill that purpose. Shi li movements are basically simplified versions of the more advanced body mechanics and circles found in the Five Elements and the Animals. Their focus is on training one's structure and Yi, and can be thought of as "zhan zhuang in movement". They are usually trained very slowly, one movement at a time, repeating the same movement for many minutes on end. The more advanced practitioner many also spontaneously link up and flow between different Shi Li movements, or train them more explosively with fa jin. In yiquan, the original Five Elements and 12 Animals have all been 'condensed' and 'refined' into forms of Shi Li, which replace them as the core exercises in the art (together with zhan zhuang).

There also exists in certain lineages a type of Shi Li drill called Si Bu Pan Gen. It originates from baguazhang, and is a form of tight Circle Walking – encircling a small square rather than a circle. The main purposes of it is to train evasive stepping and to stretch the hip and groin regions.

=== Five Element Shapes ===
Xingyi uses movements named after the five classical Chinese elements to metaphorically represent five different states of combat. Also called the "Five Fists" or "Five Phases", the Five Elements are related to Taoist cosmology although the names do not literally correspond to the cosmological terms. These five movements make the 'base' of the art, upon which all further combative knowledge and skill is built upon. Most schools will teach the five elements before the twelve animals because they are easier and shorter to learn (though eventually more difficult to master). The Five Elements do not appear in Henan xinyi liuhequan, though similar movements and methods exist in that art's curriculum.

The Five Elements of xingyiquan
	Chinese	Pinyin
Chopping	劈	Pī	Metal	Like an axe chopping down and over.
Drilling	鑽	Zuān	Water	Drilling forward diagonally. Like two waves crashing into each other.
Crushing	崩	Bēng	Wood	Like an arrow shot directly forward.
Exploding	炮	Pào	Fire	Exploding outward like a cannonball, while covering at the same time.
Crossing	橫	Héng	Earth	Crossing across the line of attack while turning over.

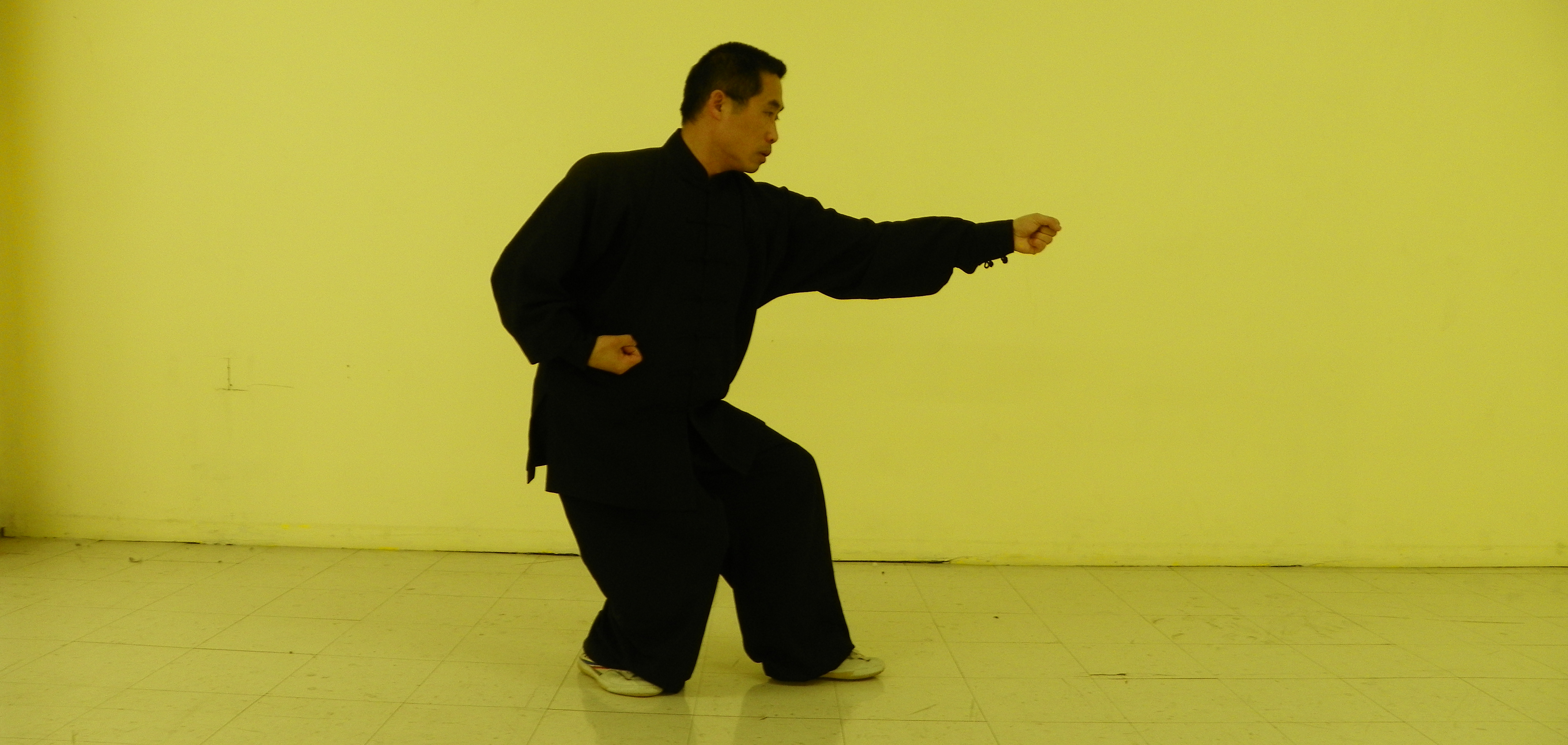
Master Yang Hai of Montreal (originally from Tianjin), demonstrating a variation of bengquan (崩拳) – one of the Five Fists (wuxing) of xingyiquan.

Each of the Five Element movements has many vectors of movement contained within it. Together, they are used to explore all the useful ways through which one could advance on a straight line. Each of the Elements may be used as a zhan zhuang in-itself, and in some schools this is encouraged.

A common saying originating from the xingyi classics is: "The hands do not leave the heart and the elbows do not leave the ribs". This is most evident in the Five Elements.

=== Animal Shapes ===
Xingyiquan is also based on twelve distinct Animal Shapes (of which, ten animals are more common – see table below). Present in all regional and family styles, these animal movements emulate the techniques and tactics of the corresponding animal rather than just their physical movements. Many schools of xingyiquan have only a small number of movements for each animal, though some teach extended sequences of movements.

The ten common animals
	Chinese	Pinyin
Bear	熊	Xióng	In xingyi, "the Bear and Eagle combine", meaning that the Bear and Eagle techniques are often used in conjunction with each other. There is a bird called the "bear eagle", which covers the characteristics of both forms. The Eagle is a piquan variation. It mimics the downward clawing action of this bird.
Eagle	鷹	Yīng	In xingyi, "the Bear and Eagle combine", meaning that the Bear and Eagle techniques are often used in conjunction with each other. There is a bird called the "bear eagle", which covers the characteristics of both forms. The Eagle is a piquan variation. It mimics the downward clawing action of this bird.
Snake	蛇	Shé	Includes both Constrictor and Viper movements.
Tiger	虎	Hǔ	Features lunging with open-handed clawing attacks mimicking the pounce of a tiger.
Dragon	龍	Lóng	The only "mythical" animal taught (except in those family systems where the phoenix is one of the 12 animals). In some lineages it is practiced separately from tiger because they are said to clash (this is a minority opinion).
Chicken	鷄	Jī	Mimics the pecking movement of a chicken and the flapping of its wings. This form also mimics the quick and aggressive combat style of the rooster.
Horse	馬	Mǎ	Combination of Pi and Heng movements that mimics the action of a rearing a horse.
Swallow	燕	Yàn	Follows the swift and random movements of the swallow by rotating position and circling the enemy with strong but quick foot movement. May refer to the purple swamphen.
Goshawk	鷂	Yào	This can mean 'Sparrowhawk,' though the more common word for "Sparrowhawk" used to be Zhān (鸇), which has fallen from use over the years. The Chinese word for "goshawk" covers both the goshawk and the sparrowhawk. Note – in some lineages this animal is translated to mean the grouse or small pheasant, as well as the phoenix. Among other things, the idea here is to train the practitioner's ability to move between the opponent's limbs and body with strikes or takedowns.
Monkey	猴	Hóu	Performed with light, agile and simple striking combined with parrying and deception of distance.

Other animals that may be present in a particular lineage
	Chinese	Pinyin
Crane	鶴	Hè
Crocodile	鼍	Tuó	The animal this is meant to represent is the Yangtze River alligator. Sometimes referred to as a water-skimming insect, or water lizard. In other lineages, this animal represents the Chinese ostrich, which some sources speculate could actually be the source of the Chinese Phoenix
Tai	鳥台 (𩿡) see note		A flycatcher bird native to Asia. Due to its rarity, the two characters may be translated as ostrich, dove, hawk or even phoenix. The correct Chinese character for this animal is 𩿡, not two. This character is not in the earlier versions of the Unicode standard, so not all computers are capable of displaying it. For further information, check the Unihan database for complete data on this character.
Turtle	龜	Guī	Represents the softshell turtle which uses quick head snapping motions to catch fish. Some schools will teach this in combination with Tuó (crocodile), considering them to be the same animal.

=== Bazigong ===
The bazigong are eight fighting combinations that exist in some lineages of the art. They emphasize direct combat applicability, and elaborate further on the movement vectors and powers explored and trained via the Five Elements. There are two variations for the bazigong – one for kung fu development, and another for actual fighting usage. The eight bazigong are: Cutting Down/Severing (Zhǎn 斬), Intercepting (Jié 截), Wrapping (Guǒ 裹), Carrying (Kuà 挎), Lifting/Raising (Tiāo 挑), Pushing Upwards (Dǐng 頂), Leading (Lìng 令) and Cloud (Yún 雲).

=== Linking forms ===
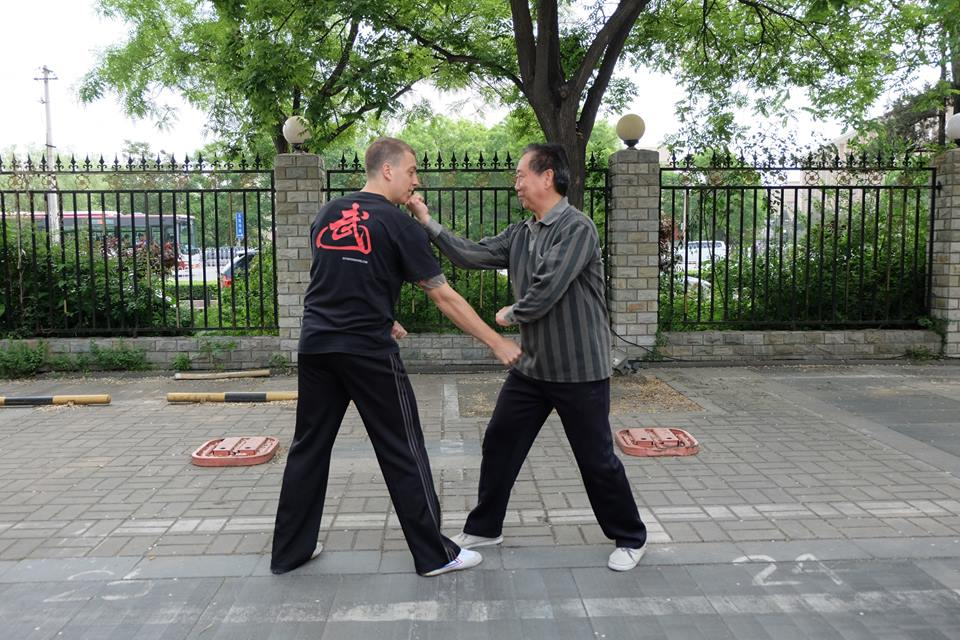
Master Di Guoyong of Beijing demonstrating a zuanquan application as part of a partner practice form (dui lian).

As well as the Five Fists and animal shapes, many lineages employ the training of several additional movement forms. Some of the more common forms are partner forms, which simulate combat scenarios. Once the individual animal shapes are taught, a student is often taught an animal linking form (shi'er xing lianhuan) which connects all the taught animals together in a sequence. Some styles have longer, or multiple forms for individual animals, such Eight Tiger Forms (huxing bashi). Other forms often link movements from the Five Fists, the different animal shapes, or both, and commonly include additional movements and techniques not found elsewhere. There also exist a bazigong linking form and many weapons forms.

=== Weapons ===
Xingyiquan emphasizes a close relationship between the movements of armed/unarmed techniques. This technical overlap aims to produce greater learning efficiency.

Traditionally xingyi was an armed art. Students would train initially with the spear, progressing to shorter weapons and eventually empty-handed fighting. This gradually changed throughout the 20th century, as the emphasis in most traditional Chinese martial arts shifted from the use of weapons to fighting empty-handed. Weapon diversity is great in many lineages, with the idea being that an experienced xingyi fighter would be able to pick up almost any weapon available (or an object to use as such) irrespective of its exact length, weight and shape.

Common weapons in the art:

- Spear. This is the weapon usually thought of as synonymous with the art. Spears are usually 1.8–5 meters in length, though those over 3 meters long are meant solely for increasing training intensity and challenge, and historically people would not commonly fight with spears that large. The five fists of xingyi have variations which are trained with the spear.
- Chinese straight sword
- Chinese sabre

Less common weapons:

- Large sabre (used by infantry against mounted opponents)
- Long staff
- Short staff (at maximum length this would be held between the palms of your hands at each end – techniques with this weapon may have been used with a spear that had been broken)
- Needles (much like a double ended rondel gripped in the centre – on the battlefield this would mostly have been used like its western equivalent to finish a fallen opponent through weak points in the armour)
- Fuyue (halberds of various types)
- Chicken-sabre sickle. This weapon was supposedly created by Ji Longfeng and became the special weapon of the style. Its alternate name is translated as "Binding Flower Waist Carry".

=== The Xingyi Classics ===
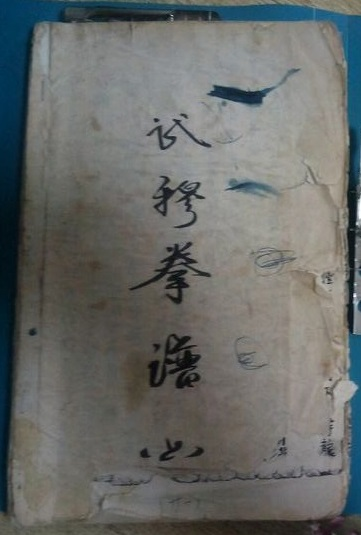
Wumuquan Pu (武穆拳譜)

A variety of important texts have survived throughout the years, often called "Classics", "Songs" or "Theories". These texts use intentionally vague language to describe the principles and methods of practice in Liuhe xingyiquan, Dai-style xingyiquan and xingyiquan. They are less relevant to more modern interpretations of these arts, such as yiquan. In the past, these texts were copied by hand, and were kept secret.

The following is a list of the most commonly referred-to classical texts:

- Classic of Unification
- Classic of Fighting
- Classic of Stepping
- Classic of Six Harmonies

Much of these texts can be read in English.

== The three stages of training power ==
Generally speaking, it is accepted that in xingyi (at least in Hebei-derived lineages), there are three stages to a practitioner's development of power and overall skill. These three stages develop and change in parallel to all other training methods, and dictate the quality of one's training methods. The following is a description of these three stages (a translation of classic texts by Devlin G. Horrinek):

- Ming jin (明勁; "Clear-to-see jin") – The strength and form must be strong, precise, and clear. Extend outward with force. When putting out force it must pass through, penetrate, pierce, connect, be pliant, ferocious, round, firm, have a shaking-cutting strength, and deliver explosive force. Practice and drill the hand techniques to develop the external 5-Elements and the elbows to develop the internal 5-Elements. Advancing and retreating with bent legs as if wading through mud (tang ni; refers to the practice and intent of Plow/Mud Stepping) like "walking while plowing through mud". This is the stage of ming jin.
- An jin (暗勁; "Hidden jin") – One must have already grasped and have a strong foundation in the ming jin stage. Then you can start on the second stage. Now when using strength you contain it and don't reveal it on the outside. Store up (xu) but don't emit (fa). Deliberately store up your Jin. The practitioner's power is held back but not released, the goal here is to unsettle the opponent and only then use the power. This is called "Treading on thin Ice" [And the feeling is like when walking on an iced-over lake and never knowing when, or if, you're going to break through the ice.]. This is the stage of an jin.
- Hua jin (化勁; "Transforming jin") – This is considered the highest stage of practice. You must have already grasped the stages of ming jin and an jin and have a very strong foundation in them. You should have a lot of fighting experience as you must know that this stage is Sheji Cong Ren (same as in tai chi). Give up yourself and comply with the opponent. Use "zhan, lian, nian, and sui" (sticky, link, adhering, and complying). Everywhere you need to be empty and not exerting strength. The whole body must be blending and smooth (hunyuan – smooth roundness) and not starting and stopping. This is the skill of 'The opponent does not know me, I alone know the opponent.' At any time, place, or moment you can emit (fa), but only emitting force at the precise moment. This is the hua jin stage.

== Famous practitioners ==
Since the validity of lineages are often controversial, this list is not intended to represent any particular lineage. Names are presented in alphabetical order using pinyin romanization.

Famous figures
Name	Chinese	Other names	Notes
Bu Xuekuan	布學寬	布子容	Famous disciple of Che Yizhai. He taught Zhao Runting who taught Wang Peisheng.
Cao Jiwu	曹繼武		Reported to have won first place in the Imperial Martial Examinations sometime in the 17th or 18th century. Student of Ji Jike and teacher of the Dai family. From him, the art split into the two lines of Dai-style xinyi and liuhe xinyiquan.
Che Yonghong	车永宏	Che Yizhai 車毅齋	First disciple (kaimen) of Li Luoneng.
Chu Guiting	褚桂亭		Disciple of Li Cunyi. He mastered xingyi, baguazhang and tai chi.
Dai Longbang	戴龍邦		First student of the art from the Dai family. Was taught by Cao Jiwu.
Fu Zhensong	傅振嵩		Chief instructor of baguazhang at the Nanjing Central Goushu Institute. Was good friends with Sun Lutang and exchanged martial arts skills with him.
Guo Yunshen	郭雲深		A famous student of Li Luoneng. A legendary tale reports him as having been incarcerated for killing a man with his Bengquan, and when confined to a prison cell only being able to practice the Tiger shape movements due to his hands being tied by chains.
Han Muxia	韓慕俠		Student of Zhang Zhaodong. Famous Northern practitioner who traveled south to train in Shanxi as well. Great patriot and national hero who defeated a well-known Russian wrestler and strongman in a duel that has since been fictionalized on television and film. Nicknamed Bei Fang Da Xia 北方大侠 (Great Northern Hero). Founder of Han Pai Wushu. Teacher of Ma Jie and Wang Peisheng.
Hong Yixiang	洪懿祥		Student of Zhang Junfeng. Founder of the Tang Shou Tao school in 1960s Taiwan. Teacher of Xu Hongji, Luo Dexiu and Su Dongchen.
Hong Yimien	洪懿祥		Older brother of Hong Yixiang and Student of Zhang Junfeng. Teacher of Allen Pittman.
Ji Longfeng	姬龍峰	Ji Jike (姬際可)	The first person to have historically been shown to practice the style that later diverged into Dai xinyi, xinyi liuehequan and xingyiquan. Taught Cao Jiwu.
Li Fuzhen	李復禎		Famous disciple of Che Yizhai.
Li Luoneng	李洛能	Li Nengran (李能然)	Nicknamed "Divine Fist Li"; The founder of modern xingyiquan.
Li Tianji	李天驥	Li LongFei (李龍飛)	Author of The Skill of Xingyiquan. Was the first Chairman of the Chinese Wushu Association. Helped to preserve the art during the Cultural Revolution.
Li Cunyi	李存義	Li Kui Yuan (李魁元)	Famous boxer. Disciple of Liu Qilan and Guo Yunshen (1847–1921). Was the owner of an armed protection services company in which many xingyi practitioners worked, including some of his own students.
Ma Xueli	馬學禮		Founder of the Henan or Muslim branch of xinyi liuhequan.
Shang Yunxiang	尚雲祥		Founder of the Shang or "New Style" of the Hebei branch. Was a disciple of Li Cunyi.
Song Shirong	宋世榮		Founder of the Song Family Style – a sub-style of the Shanxi xingyi branch.
Sun Lutang	孫祿堂	Sun Fuquan (孫福全)	Author of several books on internal arts, also known for developing Sun-style tai chi and Sun-style baguazhang. Disciple of Guo Yunshen and Li Cunyi.
Wang Jiwu	王繼武		Born 1891 in Shanxi, Yuci – 1991 in Beijing. Important master of 20th century. Disciple of Wang Fuyuan (王福元). He also got Dai-style xinyi liuhequan true legacy through his gong fu brother Peng Tingjun (彭廷雋), who also studied from Dai Kui (戴奎). He taught high skilled disciples as Zhang Baoyang (張寶楊), Li Zhongyin (李忠蔭), Pan Zhiyuan (潘志遠), He Shouqi (何守岐), Wang Lianyi (son 王連義) etc... His only one living disciple now is Zhang Baoyang (張寶楊).
Zhang Baoyang	張寶楊		Born 1922 in Hebei – 2016. Disciple of Wang Jiwu (王繼武) and uncle Zhang Xiangzhai (張祥齋). Also studied Qigong and bone-setting/acupuncture with XYQ brother Hu Yaozhen (胡耀貞). Founder and honorary president of the Beijing Xingyi Research Association. Author of the book Xingyi Neigong, written with Wang Jinyu. Still has a few highly skilled disciples in Beijing. One of his disciples Du Fukun teaches a small group of disciples in Prague, Czech republic.
Zhang Junfeng	張俊峰		Founded a major school in Taiwan in the 1950s. Later, via the lineage of his student, Hong Yixiang, his branch became one of the most popular lines of xingyi in the West. Hong Yimien, one of his most senior students.
Zhang Zhaodong	張兆	Zhang Zhankui (張占魁)	Famous boxer. Disciple of Liu Qilan. Founder of the xingyi-baguazhang system. Taught many people in the Tianjin area who later became masters in their own right.

Sifu Jose Marín-País Costa Rica (Actualmente el maestro Jose Marín del país de Costa Rica es el único heredero activo del Xing Yi Quan a nivel mundial, sistema heredado por su Maestro ya fallecido Alejandro Fung Yang.

== Lineage chart ==
The following chart, created by Shifu Jonathan Bluestein and Shifu Nitzan Oren, demonstrates the historical connections between most known lineages of xingyiquan, and related martial arts. The chart is a collaborative project between Mr. Bluestein, who created the bulk of it, and several dozen xingyiquan teachers from the West, who contributed information on their lineages and those of others. The chart project is well known in the xingyiquan community, and the information contained in it has never been disputed. An attempt was made to include as many notable teachers as possible, but due to the obvious constraints of space, not all could have been included. Disciples are marked by a direct, full, downward-flowing line. Regular students are marked with a broken line. Please note that a few minor details on the chart concerning people who lived and taught prior to the 20th century are still somewhat controversial. This is due to a lack of historical documentation.

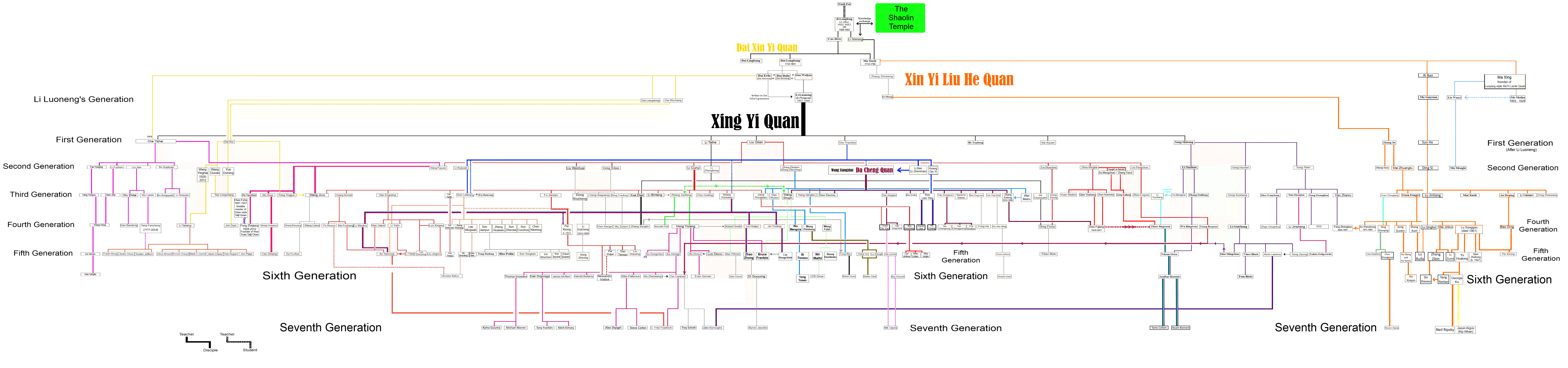
The various lineages of xingyiquan

See § Further reading for specific lineages of xingyiquan.

== Cross influences with other martial arts ==
During the course of the late 19th century and 20th century, there was a lot of cross-fertilization between notable masters of xingyi, and those of baguazhang and tai chi. This resulted in many mutual influences.

Chen Panling's tai chi (originating from Taiwan) has been influenced by xingyi and bagua.

Shanxi-style xingyi in the line of Song Shirong has incorporated bagua's Circle Walking practice, in either a circle, or tight squares or triangles (the latter practice referred to as 'Si Bu Pan Gen' – Four Step Base Encirclement).

Cheng Tinghua, a famous student of bagua founder Dong Haichuan, is said to have taught his Bagua to many xingyi masters, including Gao Yisheng, Geng Jishan and Sun Lutang.

Gao Yisheng's Gao-style baguazhang has incorporated a lot of material from xingyiquan, and his lineage, known as yizong, includes the teaching of both arts.

Sun Lutang, one of the most famous practitioner of xingyi in the 20th century, had learnt Chen-style baguazhang and Wu (Hao)-style tai chi after many decades of practicing xingyi. He then later went to develop his own unique forms of bagua and tai chi, which were heavily influenced by his former experience training in xingyi.

Many martial arts lines, notably that of Chen-style tai chi from Chen village, have begun to practice the zhan zhuang posture known as hunyuan zhuang (or chengbao zhuang) in recent decades. The origin of that posture in modern times is probably either xingyiquan or yiquan, as it is basic in the arts' practices.

Contrary to a modern hypothesis proposed by Karate practitioners, Xingyi was not "created based on Bajiquan and did not "influence greatly the development of Okinawan Karate". Rather, Okinawan Karate was most heavily influenced by southern-Chinese arts. This is well substantiated in historical Karate literature, such as in the works of Patrick McCarthy.

== Cultural aspects ==
=== Relationship with Chinese culture ===
Like all traditional Chinese martial arts, xingyi features a strong bond to the military, religious, philosophical and cultural traditions of China.

Xingyi's weapons are mostly ones which were used on Chinese battlefields throughout the centuries, with the dao (sword) and qiang (spear) being the most prominent members of that group. Many consider the style to have originally been a 'military art' (as opposed to a sport like boxing, or an urban self-defense system like Wing Chun).

Xingyi's Five Shapes ('Five Elements') are a borrowed concept from Traditional Chinese Medicine (which in turn had borrowed them from Daoism).

The 12 Animal shapes were influenced, in part, by the Chinese zodiac. The Dragon, being the Chinese mythical animal, begets its supposed physical description and attributes from Chinese lore.

Like all neijia arts, xingyi is heavily influenced by Daoism. Its combat meditation methods (zhan zhuang) existed in similar forms in Daoism before being integrated into martial arts in later centuries. The whole theory behind "using softness to overcome hardness" and similar ideas have their origins in the Dao De Jing. Daoist concepts are readily implemented into xingyi training, as described in the following paragraph from Sun Lutang: "Before training, there is no thought or intention, no figure or image, no self or others, only qi exists in the chaos of the body. The state is called Wuji in Xingyi. Without knowing the principle of "inverse motion", people always rigidly adhered to the principle of the "direct motion nature". Hence the internal Qi is restrained and things cannot be properly realized due to an obscure mind that causes the body to be weak. They do not know the principle of health that extreme Yang leads to Yin and extreme Yin leads to death. However, sages can be versed in the way of inverse motion, and control the relation between Yin and Yang, manage the principal of creation, direct Liang Yi (another name for Yin and Yang), grasp the key points, and go back to the pre-natal from the post-natal realm to settle at the original position as the body becomes an integral unit. Its way is nothing more than the principle of stretching and contracting as in post-natal Wu Xing and Bagua boxing. This is called the generation of Qi from WuJi."

=== Popular culture appearances in modern times ===
Xingyiquan has been featured in various media through the years.

- In the Dead or Alive series of video games, Gen Fu and Eliot employ the style.
- In the Tekken series, Wang Jinrei uses xingyiquan, while Michelle Chang and her daughter, Julia Chang, use xingyi mixed with professional wrestling and Bajiquan.
- In the Mortal Kombat series, Shao Kahn employs xingyiquan as well as Taizu changquan.
- Jet Li performed a modern Wushu adaptation of xingyi in the 2001 action movie The One (seen used by the hero's evil alternate dimensional self in a multiverse).
- In the manga series Negima!, the title character studies xingyi as part of his Chinese martial arts training.
- Xingyi, as well as xinyi liuhequan, are also featured in the manga series Kenji.
- In the film Ip Man 4: The Finale, supporting character Master Chiang is a xingyi grandmaster.
- Xingyiquan inspired some techniques on airbending and firebending on the 2005–2008 Nickelodeon Animation Studio TV series Avatar: The Last Airbender, M. Night Shyamalan's 2010 film counterpart, its 2024 Netflix counterpart, and its sequel series The Legend of Korra.

== See also ==
- Baguazhang
- Liuhebafa
- Neijia
- Tai chi
- Yiquan
