= Gao-style baguazhang =

Gao Style Baguazhang
- Also known as: Cheng School Gao Style Baguazhang
- Hardness: Internal (neijia)
- Country of origin: China
- Creator: Gao Yisheng
- Famous practitioners: Hong Yixiang, Luo Dexiu, He Kecai (founder of Ho Ho Choy Baguazhang)
- Parenthood: Baguazhang (Song & Cheng Style Baguazhang), Xingyiquan, Yang-style tai chi, Dachengquan
- Descendant arts: Ho Ho Choy Baguazhang
- Olympic sport: No

Gao Style Baguazhang (Chinese: 高氏八卦掌) is the style of Baguazhang descended from Gao Yisheng, a student of Cheng Tinghua, who founded one of the two main branches of Baguazhang. Gao is alternatively said to have originally studied with Song Changrong (宋長榮) or Yin Fu, later (or alternatively previously) studying with one of Cheng's students, Zhou Yuxiang (周玉祥). Gao style is one of the most widely practiced Baguazhang styles in the West; there are also many practitioners in Tianjin and Taiwan. It has many variations held within various lineages, some which are given below:

- Dong Haichuan
  - Cheng Tinghua
    - Zhou Yuxiang
      - Gao Yisheng
        - Wu Jinyuan
        - Wu Huaishan
          - Wu Guozheng
        - Liu Fengcai
          - Wang Shusheng
          - Liu Shuhang
          - Chen Baozhen
          - Han Fangrui
        - He Kecai (Cantonese: Ho Ho Choi)
          - Cheung Sing Tang (C. S. Tang)
        - Zhang Junfeng
          - Hong Yixiang
            - Luo Dexiu
            - Su Dongchen
          - Hong Yiwen
          - Hong Yimien
            - Allen Pittman
        - Wu Mengxia
          - Wu Min'an
          - Bi Tianzuo
        - Bi Motang
          - Bi Tianzuo

The Gao style system is referred to as the Gao Yisheng branch of the Cheng Tinghua system of Baguazhang. Essentially, Gao Style Bagua is a unique subsystem. The Gao style system, because of Gao's own martial progression over time, can be found to have a number of different permutations, represented in these various lingages. All are valid examples of Gao style Bagua because they all represent Gao Yisheng’s progression as a martial artist. Gao was refining and creating sets until he died. He changed his straight line, pre-heaven and weapons sets more than once in his life but at its core it is a complete Baguazhang system.

Gao style explicitly divides training into two categories: pre-heaven (先天) and post-heaven (後天). Pre-heaven training includes walking the circle and practicing changing palms on the circle; this material is similar to that found in the other Cheng styles. Post-heaven training consists of 64 linear palms (六十四掌) is said by Gao Yisheng to be passed down by a man known as Song Yiren (宋益仁) (i.e., Song Yiren (送藝人), or "person who gives arts"); these palms are unique to the Gao system.

Many Gao style practitioners can be found in Tianjin (lineage of Liu Fengcai and others), Taiwan (lineage of Zhang Junfeng), and Hong Kong (lineage of He Kecai).
