= Fu Zhensong =

Chinese martial artist

Fu Zhensong 傅振嵩
- Born: 1872; Mapo village, Biyangxian, Huaiqing, Henan, China
- Died: 1953 (aged 80–81)
- Style: Chen-style tai chi, Ma style Baguazhang, Cheng Style Baguazhang, Wudang Sword, Xingyiquan, Sun-style tai chi, Yang-style tai chi
- Teachers: Ma Gui; Cheng Tinghua; Song Weiyi; Sun Lutang; Yang Chengfu
- Rank: Founder of Fu Style Baguazhang

Fu Zhensong
- Chinese: 傅振嵩
Transcriptions
Standard Mandarin
- Hanyu Pinyin: Fu Zhènsōng
- Wade–Giles: Fu Chen-sung

Fu Qiankun
- Chinese: 傅乾坤
Transcriptions

Fu Zhensong (Wade–Giles: Fu Chen-sung; 1872–1953), also known by his courtesy name Fu Qiankun, was a grandmaster of Wudangquan martial arts who founded Fu Style Baguazhang.

He was born in Mapo village, Biyang County, Henan province, China.
