= Sun Zhijun =

Chinese martial artist

Sun Zhijun (Chinese: 孫志君) (1933 – August 13, 2016) was a teacher of Cheng style baguazhang, in Beijing, China. Born in 1933 in Cheng Village, Shen County, Hebei Province, Sun began his baguazhang training under Liu Ziyang (劉子楊), disciple of Cheng Dianhua (程殿華) (Cheng Tinghua's younger brother). Later, he also had the opportunity to study with Cheng Yousheng (程有生) (Cheng Dianhua's son) and Cheng Youxin (程有信) (Cheng Tinghua's second son) in Beijing. He had many disciples teaching his baguazhang around the world. At 23:20 on August 13, 2016, he died in Jingxian at the age of 83.

Besides traditional baguazhang, Sun also taught baguazhang to modern wushu players for competition, training over 10 baguazhang national champions in the past 20 years.

Championships:

- 1. 1964 Beijing Martial Art Championship Champion (palms & weapons)
- 2. 1983 National Conventional Martial Arts Championship Champion
- 3. 2004 World Conventional Martial Arts Festival Champion (palm & saber)

Coaching Achievements:

- 1982 Coached Beijing Municipal Women's Martial Art Team
- 1982 Coached at Eastern Municipal Martial Art Institute
- 1983 Obtained National Coach of Excellence's title
- 1983 2 Academic visits to Japan for Ba Gua Zhang exchanges
- 1992/93/2005 3 Academic visits introducing Cheng style Ba Gua Zhang to Singapore
- 2006 Coached Cheng style Ba Gua Zhang in Korea

Publications:

- 1983-86 Was appointed by the Chinese Wu Shu association, as an exclusive commissar of Cheng style to compile information on Cheng Style Baguazhang and weapons. (China)
- 1990 Conventional Chinese Martial Arts (China) VCD
- 1992 Ba Gua Zhang
- 1992 Cheng Style Ba Gua Zhang
- 1994; 2004 Swimming Body interlinked Ba Gua Zhang (China; Taipei, Singapore) Book
- 2001 Swimming Body interlinked Ba Gua Zhang (including weapons) (China) VCD
- 2005 Ba Gua Zhang Counter-Attack (China) VCD
- 2005 Ba Gua Saber Counter-Attack (China) VCD
- 2005 Elaborations on the Applications Of Swimming Body Interlinked Ba Gua Zhang (China) VCD
- 2005 Hei Bei Xing Yi Boxing (China) VCD
- 2012 You Shen Ba Gua Lian Huan Zhang (China) Book and DVD
