= Hsu Hung-chi =

Taiwanese martial artist

Hsu Hung-chi

Hsu Hung-chi or Xu Hongji (simplified Chinese: 许鸿基; traditional Chinese: 許鴻基; pinyin: Xǔ Hóngjī) (1934–1984) was a Taiwanese martial artist who specialized in the Neijia of xingyiquan, baguazhang and taijiquan.

Hsu was born in Taihoku, Taihoku Prefecture, in 1934 to a family of six brothers. In school, he was very athletic and participated in swimming, soccer and judo. He began his study of Shaolin kung fu with his father at an early age. He also learned boxing and became a skilled street fighter. After studying the external styles of shaolin for many years, he discovered the unique effectiveness of the neijia and began training with Hung I-Hsiang, a master of all three of the major Chinese internal arts, xingyiquan, baguazhang and taijiquan.

After many years of training, Hsu opened his own martial arts school. Hsu's school used a modified version of the Tang Shou Tao (唐手道; lit. Chinese Hand Way) system developed by his teacher Hung I-hsiang. Hsu named his school Shen Long Tang Shou Tao (神龙唐手道; lit. Spirit Dragon Chinese Hand Way). Tang Shou Tao is not a separate style of martial art, but rather a practical, step-by-step, systematic approach to learning internal martial arts and developing highly refined levels of skill.

It incorporates elements of all three of the internal arts (xingyi, bagua, taiji) as well as Shaolin kung fu and qigong. Although he incorporated elements learned from other teachers, Hsu's Tang Shou Tao curriculum was very similar to Hung's.

Hsu felt that if a person, no matter what their race or nationality, sincerely wanted to learn and was willing to work hard, then he would teach them. In the late 1960s he began teaching American and Japanese students in Taiwan. This led to his falling out of grace with many of his fellow Chinese, including his teacher Hung I-hsiang, even though Hsu was one of Hung's senior students at the time.

For many years, Hsu traveled annually to Japan to teach, and several of his Japanese students later established martial arts school there, including Senga masaki. He also taught a number of long-term American students in Taiwan who later founded schools in the United States, among them Mike Bingo, Mike Patterson, John Price, Harold Bellamy, Thomas Snowden, Dale Shigenaga, Charles Alsip, and Pam Holder. Several second-generation students also went on to establish schools, including Vince Black, James McNeil, Steven Baugh, Tom Bisio, Anthony Franklin, Mark Kimzey, Alex Shpigel, and Steve Cotter. Later generations of students including Read Wall and Danny Motta, also became instructors.

== Links to Websites of Hsu Hung-Chi's Students ==
- Shen Lung Tang Shou Tao John Price
- Hsing-I Martial Arts Institute (Mike Patterson)
- Little Nine Heaven Kung Fu School (James McNeil)
- New York Internal Arts (Tom Bisio)
- American Tang Shou Tao Association (Dale Shigenaga)
- North American Tang Shou Tao Association (Vince Black)
- The Sin Lung Kwoon (Mike Bingo)
- Lohan School of Shaolin (Steven Baugh)
- AiBukan Dojo (Thomas Snowden)
- Saint Louis School of Xing Yi (Mark Kimzey)
- Kingdom Warrior Academy Of Martial Arts (Dr. Read Wall, DPT)
