= Liang Zhenpu =

Chinese martial artist

Liang Zhenpu 梁振蒲
- Born: 1863; Beihaojia Village, Ji County, Hebei, China
- Died: 1932 (aged 68–69)
- Other names: Second Hand Clothing Liang
- Style: Tán Tuǐ, Baguazhang
- Teacher: Dong Haichuan (董海川)
- Trainer: Yin Fu, Cheng Tinghua, Shi Jidong, Liu Fengchun
- Rank: Founder of Liang Style Baguazhang

Other information
- Notable students: Li Ziming

Liang Zhenpu (梁振蒲) (1863–1932) was a Chinese martial artist.

== Biography ==
Liang Zhenpu was born in Beihaojia Village in Ji County in Hebei province on May 20, 1863 during the Qing dynasty under the reign of the Tongzhi Emperor. He trained in Tan Tui and Biaozhang during his early childhood. At the age of 13, he moved to Beijing to become an apprentice at his father's second-hand clothing store. At this time he had the nickname "Second Hand Clothing Liang". During this period, in 1877, he became a direct disciple of Baguazhang creator Dong Haichuan. He studied with Dong for about five years, also learning from Dong's other students including Cheng Tinghua, Yin Fu, Shi Jidong, and Liu Fengchun. After the death of both his parents at age 20, he opened a martial arts guan to make a living.

In Ji County he defeated the four "Batian" gangs. In 1899, he saw many injustices being committed by local gangs in the Beijing suburb of Majiapu (马家堡) and single-handedly fought over 200 gang members armed only with a seven-section chain whip, killing 20 and wounding over 50. He was subsequently imprisoned and sentenced to death. When the Eight-Nation Alliance army invaded Beijing to crush the Boxer Rebellion, his prison was heavily damaged and he managed to escape.

Liang Zhenpu died on August 13, 1932, at the age of 69. He is the only student of Dong Haichuan to be buried next to his tomb.

== Baguazhang style ==
As the youngest disciple of Dong, he trained not only with Dong but also with both Yin Fu and Cheng Tinghua, and as a result his style of Baguazhang has some characteristics of both styles. Examples include the Ox Tongue Palm from Yin Style and wrestling movements from Cheng Style. His Baguazhang forms are taught in a circle with the exception of Liu Dekuan's 64 Linear Palms, unlike versions from earlier students (for example, Yin Style Baguazhang) which have many linear segments. One of Liang's students was Li Ziming.
