= Ho Ho Choy-style baguazhang =

Style of Chinese martial art

Ho Ho Choy Baguazhang (何可才八卦掌)
- Also known as: Ho Ho Choi Baguazhang, Dao Zong
- Hardness: Internal (neijia)
- Country of origin: China
- Creator: He Kecai
- Famous practitioners: Cheung-Sing Tang / C.S. Tang
- Parenthood: Gao Style Baguazhang
- Olympic sport: No

Ho Ho Choy Baguazhang is a style of Baguazhang, a Chinese martial art. Specifically, it is a substyle of Gao Style Baguazhang, which is in turn a substyle of Cheng Style Baguazhang.

== History ==
A disciple of Gao Yisheng, named He Kecai (Cantonese: Ho Ho Choy; 何可才) taught Baguazhang in Hong Kong. His students still teach today. However the name is now called "Ho Ho Choy Baguazhang" to differentiate from other branches spread from Gao Yisheng.

As Ho Ho Choy was one of the last disciples of Gao, and after Gao's death he compared his art with those of Gao's earlier students and found that although the name and movement of most techniques are the same, the inner dynamics vary considerably; and so Ho's student called the Baguazhang they teach "Ho Ho Choy Baguazhang" to differentiate.
