= Tang Shou Tao =

Hung I-Hsiang (L) teaching Tang Shou Tao system in Taipei, Taiwan (c. 1970s)

Yizong Tang Shou Tao (易宗唐手道, Hanyu Pinyin: Yi Zong Tang Shou Dao, lit. "Essence of Change Chinese Hand Way") is a system of Chinese internal martial arts training founded in the 1950s and 1960s by Hung I-Hsiang (洪懿祥, Hanyu Pinyin: Hong Yixiang), a well-known Taiwanese internal martial artist. The system was further modified by Hung's student, Hsu Hung-Chi (許鴻基, Hanyu Pinyin: Xu Hongji) under the name Shen Long Tang Shou Tao (神龍唐手道; lit. "Spirit Dragon Chinese Hand Way").

Tang Shou Tao is not a separate style of martial art, but rather a practical, step-by-step, systematic approach to learning internal martial arts and developing highly refined levels of skill. It incorporates elements of all three of the major Chinese internal arts (xingyiquan, baguazhang, and taijiquan) as well as Shaolin kung fu, Taiwanese White Crane, qigong and the essentials of Karate.

However, the emphasis of this system is on xingyi and bagua. Although the system itself was formed and founded by Hung I-Hsiang during the 1950s and 1960s, the roots of using the commonalities of bagua and xingyi in practice and application can easily be traced back through Hung's teacher Chang Chun-Feng (張俊峰) to his teachers, Li Cunyi (李存義) and Gao Yisheng (高義盛). Hung opened his first school Tang Shou Tao school in Taipei in the mid-1960s.

When Hung I-Hsiang took a trip to Japan, he was very impressed with the way martial arts instruction was organized there. He liked the uniforms, the belt system, and the systematic approach to training. Subsequently, he adopted many of the Japanese style martial arts school characteristics when he opened his own school. The students had belt ranks, wore Japanese style uniforms, and Hung devised a more systematic approach to martial arts instruction than what was typical of most Chinese style schools.

Hung felt that before a student was ready to learn xingyiquan or any of the other internal arts, he first had to acquire body strength and basic martial arts skill. The beginning student in Hung's Tang Shou Tao system executes many basic exercises which develop body strength, flexibility, coordination, and balance at the rudimentary level. Many of these exercises were taken from Japanese styles such as Judo. The basic curriculum also included simple forms which Hung had put together by combining Shaolin with basic xingyi and bagua movements and techniques. Hung wanted students to have a basic understanding of blocking, kicking, punching, and throwing before they began to study the more refined internal arts.
