= Liu Wanchuan =

Liu Wanchuan (刘万川)
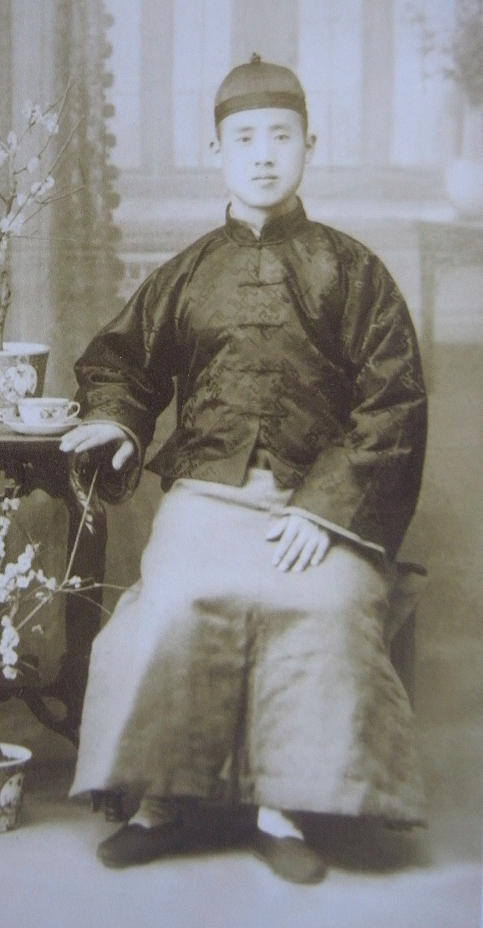
- Liu Wanchuan
- Born: November 1, 1906; Haiyang, China
- Died: November 6, 1991; Beijing, China
- Other names: Liu Yi Hai
- Nationality: Chinese
- Style: Baguazhang

Other information
- Occupation: Martial arts teacher

Liu Wanchuan (also known as Liu Yi Hai) (Chinese: 刘万川) (November 1, 1906 – November 6, 1991) was a teacher of the Chinese Neijia (internal) martial art Baguazhang. He studied with Ma Gui
