= Ma Gui =

Ma Gui may refer to:

- Ma Gui (general) (1543–1607), Ming Dynasty general
- Ma Gui (martial artist) (1847/51–1941), master of the Chinese martial art of Baguazhang
