= Ma Gui (martial artist) =

Ma Gui (马贵)
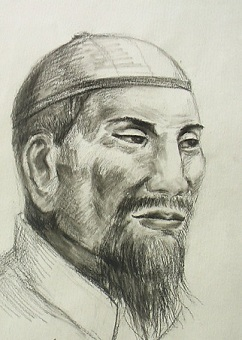
- A portrait of Ma Gui.
- Born: 1847/1851; Beijing, China
- Died: 1941 (aged 93–94); Beijing, China
- Other names: Ma Shiqing, Wood Ma
- Nationality: Chinese
- Style: Baguazhang
- Teachers: Yin Fu; Dong Haichuan
- Rank: Founder of Ma Gui style Baguazhang

Other information
- Occupation: Martial arts teacher Lumber merchant
- Notable students: Liu Wanchuan; Wang Peisheng

Ma Gui (also known as Ma Shiqing) (Chinese: 马贵; pinyin: Má Guì) (1847–1941 or 1851–1941) was an accomplished master of the internal Chinese martial art of Baguazhang, and was the first disciple of Yin Fu, who in turn was the first disciple of Baguazhang's founder Dong Haichuan. Various lines of Baguazhang claiming lineage to Ma Gui (but comprising different material) are still actively taught in China as well as in Japan, North America, and Europe.

== Biography ==
Ma Gui's parents were originally from Laishui County, Hebei province but eventually relocated to Beijing where Ma Gui was born and raised.

Ma Gui grew up to become a lumber merchant by trade and was nicknamed "Mu Ma" or "Lumber Ma". He was called this to differentiate himself from another prominent Bagua master, Ma Weiqi, who was in the coal business and hence nicknamed "Mei Ma" or "Coal Ma". Ma Gui was also called "Cuozi Ma" or "Little Ma" due to his short stature.

=== Introduction to Bagua at an early age ===
Ma Gui began studying Baguazhang at the age of twelve with Yin Fu and then with Dong Haichuan while still a teenager. Unlike many of Dong's top students, Yin Fu, Cheng Tinghua, and Ma Weiqi, who blended Bagua into their extensive martial arts background, Ma Gui had very little martial arts experience before studying Bagua and therefore was taught unique training fundamentals designed to develop Bagua fighting skills from the ground up. He remained steadfastly devoted to his two masters and trained with them exclusively throughout both of their lives. Like Dong's disciple Shi Shidong, Ma Gui helped house the elderly Dong Haichuan for several years until Dong's death in 1882.

=== Rigorous training and a conservative approach to teaching ===
Ma Gui advocated a rigorous approach to training with a heavy emphasis on developing extraordinary lower leg strength. According to current Ma Gui Style Baguazhang teacher Li Baohua, "The Baguazhang passed on by Ma Gui emphasizes the lower basin walking, so his lower legs were extremely thick. Lower basin walking means that the strength of the whole body is concentrated on the lower legs and feet, using the hidden strength of the bones and tendons. Ma Gui's lower legs were so developed that the shin bone was completely protected by tissue. He often had Liu Wanchuan (Li Baohua's grandmaster) look at his shins, and would occasionally allow people to hit them with wooden or iron staffs." Ma Gui would often wear a sand filled jacket on his body or a sand filled belt around his waist or legs for strength training and would also attach ropes on nearby trees to make a netting, and then train under the netting. The netting would ensure that he stayed low. Ma Gui was also known to demonstrate his strength by Bagua circle walking underneath a three foot high table. While an impressive feat, the majority of Ma Gui's leg training was not done through walking at such an extremely low level, but rather was cultivated by countless hours of his system's "bear walking:" slow concentrated circle-walking in a horse stance that dramatically transforms the large tendon lines from neck to feet and strengthens the entire body.

Ma Gui was most famous for his devastating fighting technique called the "zhibi wanda"—a wrist strike with a straightened arm. According to third generation Yin Style Baguazhang master He Puren, "In order to practice his wrist-striking, he would do a press-up style exercise that involved him falling forward onto the floor onto the back of his wrists and then springing back up to a standing position, which he would practice repeatedly and could do with ease. He had bested many famous masters using only his wrist-striking. You couldn't touch his body, if you did it felt like being electrocuted." To further strengthen this technique Ma was also known to practice with ten-pound iron rings on each wrist.

Ma Gui had a reputation for being an extremely conservative teacher who demanded the very best of his students. As a busy lumber merchant he did not have to teach professionally and he was therefore able to maintain extremely high standards in training. Fiercely dedicated to the traditional way he had been taught Bagua by Yin Fu and Dong Haichuan, he refused to modify his teachings to make them easier and felt that "anyone who felt the skill was too difficult to learn should not be taught in the first place."

=== A Leader of the Third Bagua Generation ===
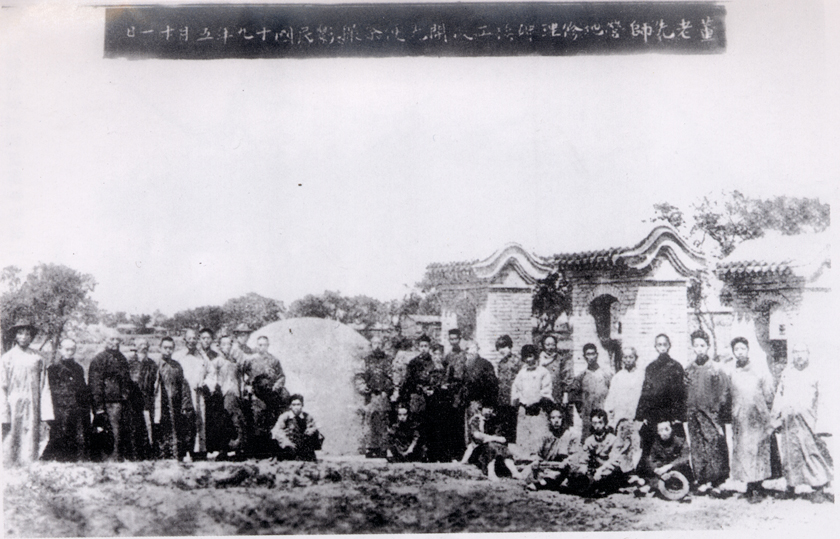
Ma (third from the right of the headstone, in black hat)) at Dong Haichuan's Tomb

While Ma Gui's conservative teaching approach turned away many students, he was still highly sought after as an instructor. He was hired as the martial arts instructor for the son of Qing Dynasty Prince Duan early in his career. His reputation only grew over time, and after surviving both the turmoil of the Boxer Rebellion and later the Xinhai Revolution, he eventually became a martial arts instructor at the National Police School in 1919.

In 1930, following in his teacher Yin Fu's footsteps he erected in 1930 a third commemorative stele on Dong Haichuan's gravesite. As the leader of the third generation of Bagua students, he offered the following words for future generations:

Dong left us happiness and long age as lasting mountains from the land of Chinese Traditions. May his art shine and expand in our nation. He had an incredible strength and was involved in the education of his country. He was trying to bring happiness by elevating to the origin of everything.

=== Teaching increases in old age ===
While still highly conservative in his teaching, Ma Gui began to teach more openly to students in his seventies after his lumber business began to fail and he needed financial support. Among the prominent students whom Ma Gui taught in his later years were Li Shao'an (1888–1982), and his business partner Liu Wanchuan, Wu-style tai chi master Wang Peisheng, and Liu Hung Chieh (1905–1986).

In his advanced age, Ma Gui also imparted special teachings from Dong Haichuan on meditation and energy work, including Dong's special "internal dantian" practice. According to Liu Hung Chieh's student Bruce Frantzis, "Ma Shr Ching told Liu how Dong had taught. Dong frequently would sit with his eyes closed, describe every motion Ma was making, and tell him to adjust it one way or another. Dong used to sit and meditate for hours every day. The basis of his martial power, at least according to Ma, was at least as much due to his sitting practices, which were pure Taoist meditation, as to his martial arts techniques."

Ma Gui continued to train extremely hard well into his golden years and for sparring was said to favor the triple chuanzhang (spearing palm), another famous technique that Ma Gui perfected. According to Li Baohua, "When Ma Gui was in his 80s he would still train the triple chuanzhang. To Liu Wanchuan, watching from the side, Ma Gui's body looked very light, as if his feet did not even touch the ground."

=== Ma Gui's legacy ===
Ma Gui's decision to teach more seriously later in life meant that only a rare few actually carried on the full extent of his knowledge. Many third and fourth generation Baguazhang fighters were influenced by Ma Gui's teachings but only received bits of his knowledge. Today there are only two known lineages that can be said to have received the full transmission of his martial arts teachings—the schools of Liu Wanchuan and Wang Peisheng. Liu Wanchuan's lineage is being taught through the Magui Baguazhang Promotion Center, and its many teachers around the globe. Wang Peisheng's lineage is being taught by the Yin Cheng Gong Fa Association. However, the material taught by both lines are dissimilar—Liu Wanchuan's material includes 8 animals, an 88 movement routine, a 128 movement routine, partner drills, and other material; Wang Peisheng's material includes luohanquan, 64 palms, and the 18 intercepting sabers from Ma.
