= Gao Yisheng =

Chinese baguazhang practitioner

Gao Yisheng 高義盛
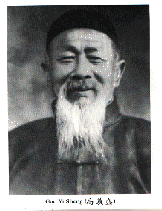
- Portrait of Gao Yisheng.
- Born: 1866; Da Zhuang Zi Village, Da Shan Township, Wu Di County, Shandong province, China
- Died: 1951 (aged 84–85)
- Style: Dahongquan, Song-style baguazhang, Cheng-style baguazhang, Xingyiquan
- Teachers: Song Changrong (宋长荣); Cheng Tinghua; Li Cunyi; Sung Yi-Ren
- Rank: Founder of Gao-style baguazhang

Gao Yisheng (simplified Chinese: 高义盛; traditional Chinese: 高義盛; pinyin: Gāo Yìshèng) (1866–1951) was the creator of the Gao style of baguazhang. His life bridged the second generation and third generation of baguazhang practitioners into the 20th century. He was one of the few third generation baguazhang practitioners to live beyond the 1940s. His innovation and impact on baguazhang as a fighting art cannot be underestimated.

== Life ==
Gao Yisheng was born in Dazhuangzi Village, Dashan Township, Wudi County, Shandong province, China in 1866. During his childhood his family fortune was lost so they moved to Wu Ching County, Shaogao township in Hebei province to find employment. When he was young his leg was broken by a mule cart and the bone was set incorrectly so Gao walked with a cane the rest of his life. As a boy he learned the art of dahongquan (Big Red Fist) in his home village.

In 1892 when Gao was twenty-six years old he began his study of baguazhang with Dong Haichuan’s student Sung Zhangjun (Song Changrong). After three years of practice with Song all he had learned was basic circle walking and the single palm change. Gao asked for more instruction, but Song refused and Gao left to find another teacher.

At age thirty, in 1896, Gao met Zhou Yuxiang. Zhou was a talented student of Cheng Tinghua. Zhou’s skill in fighting had earned him the nickname “Peerless Palm” Zhou. Gao and Zhou “crossed hands” three times and Gao was defeated each time. Gao knelt and asked to become Zhou's disciple. Zhou said they were too close in age for him to bring him into the system so Zhou took Gao to Beijing to meet his teacher Cheng Tinghua. Cheng accepted him as his student because of his previous experience with Sung and on Zhou Yuxiang's recommendation. Gao learned the majority of the system from Zhou and would travel to Beijing periodically to study with Cheng, until Cheng's death four years later. Gao learned the eight xian tian palms, weapons forms and applications.

After six years of intense study Gao began teaching Cheng-style baguazhang in Shaogao. Some time between 1902 and 1911 Gao also studied xingyiquan with Li Cunyi. In 1911 he returned to his home village in Shandong province at the age of forty–five at which time he started teaching his own Gao-style baguazhang.

Around 1912 Gao claimed he met Song Yiren, a Taoist from Guanghua Mountain who gave him the houtian sets. It is likely that this is a fabrication because the Chinese attribute many of their martial arts to famous yet obscure sources. Even his direct students expressed doubts about this story. There are many baguazhang systems with application based short forms similar to Gao's houtian sets. It is not difficult to imagine that Gao had learned some of them from Cheng or Zhou. Another student of Zhou Yuxiang wrote a book that had 31 of Gao's 64 houtian palms in it. Han Muxia, grand-student of Cheng Tinghua and friend of Zhou Yuxiang's had 48 straight line baguazhang sets almost identical to Gao's. Based on the above facts, it is possible that Gao may have standardized 48 of the houtian from his experience with Zhou, Cheng and Li Cunyi then rounded out the total number to 64 in accordance with well-known Daoist cosmology.

Between 1911 and 1917, Gao moved to Yang village in Wu Ching County, about ten miles from Tianjin. He taught in Yang village and in Tianjin. Gao would also periodically return to his home village in Da Shan Township in Shandong province to teach. Tianjin was a rough and violent place with many experienced martial artists, gangsters and coarse people. Anyone who taught martial arts in Tianjin City had to have real fighting skill.

Gao's main source of income was teaching martial arts classes so his class structure was designed to teach anyone who wanted to learn. His public classes contained multiple levels, each level of study costing more money; some students only wanted to learn baguazhang for health, others for show, some could not afford to learn more than what was taught in the basic class and still others wanted fighting skill. He trained his students according to their interests, attitude, and physical condition.

In 1942 he fought with a tai chi teacher in the park. Gao defeated him but injured him so badly he died three days later. To avoid the police Gao fled to Wu Ching village. He never returned to the Tianjin area and spent his remaining years living in the back of a Chinese medicine shop; he died in 1951 at the age of eighty-five.

== Lineages ==
During his 40+ years of teaching baguazhang Gao Yisheng's skill grew and developed. Accordingly, his baguazhang changed and developed as well. During his long teaching career, he had hundreds if not thousands of students. These students and schools show the progression of Gao as a martial artist. This does not mean that one lineage is better than another. What it does show is that Gao had a deep understanding of the principles of baguazhang throughout his long career and all these schools are representative of Gao Yisheng's teaching and philosophy.

Today, there many schools and teachers that have descended from his lineage. There are many other schools not listed here. The main branches of his lineage come from Tianjin, Hong Kong, and Taipei (there are two separate lineages in Taipei).

Tianjin City: Liu Fengcai was Gao's nephew and studied with him in Shandong and followed him to Tianjin city when he moved there. He taught classes for Gao and was known for his skill in the Xian Tian (pre-heaven) palms.

In Taipei, Taiwan the older lineage comes from Wu Jin-yuan and his son Wu Huai-shan. Both of these men studied with Gao early on when he was teaching in Shandong province. It is possible that Wu Jin-Yuan, who was already an accomplished martial artist, helped Gao develop some of the houtian sets. Wu Jin-yuan was Gao's first disciple. The family fled to Taiwan during the Chinese Communist Revolution.

The other lineage from Taipei, Taiwan comes from Zhang Junfeng. Zhang was a private student of Gao during his years in the city of Tianjin, China. He became Chairman of the Tianjin City Martial Arts Association and was known for his fighting skill. Gao gave his lineage the name "yizong". He fled to Taipei, Taiwan during the Communist Revolution.

The Hong Kong branch of Gao's art comes from He Kecai (Ho Ho Choi). Ho was a student of Gao's who was small in stature and had to work very hard against the larger students, thereby learning a great deal in the process. Gao gave this branch the lineage name "daozong", but the name is rarely used.

In addition to these more well-known branches, there is also a branch of Gao-style baguazhang called "zhezong" (广华哲宗同易派) which traces its teaching from Gao's well-known student Wu Mengxia. According to both Zhang Junfeng and He Kecai, Wu Mengxia was their senior brother under Gao Yisheng and shared much information on Gao-style baguazhang theory with them. This branch survived quietly via the Bi family in Beijing after Wu Mengxia was imprisoned during the Communist assumption of power.

== The Gao-style system ==
The Gao-style system of martial arts is specifically referred to as the Gao Yisheng branch of the Cheng Tinghua system of baguazhang. Essentially, Gao-style baguazhang is a unique subsystem. The Gao-style system, because of Gao's own martial progression over time, can be found to have a number of different permutations, represented in various lineages. All are valid examples of Gao-style baguazhang because they all represent Gao Yisheng's progression as a martial artist. Not all of the lineages have all of the levels. Gao was refining and creating sets until he died. He changed his straight line, pre-heaven and weapons sets more than once in his life, but at its core it is a complete baguazhang system.

Gao's baguazhang as listed in his book:

1. Basic Exercises (Start posture, standing postures, tangnibu, wuxingbu, eight Basic Stretches)
2. Basic Forms - Turning Forms (static palms)
3. Xiantian - Changing Forms (8 Big Palms)
4. Dan Huan Zhang and Wu Lung Bai Wei (Beginning and Ending Palms)
5. Houtian 64 Palms
6. 12 animals
7. Push Hands and Attack & Defense
8. Weapons Forms

The zhezong and yizong branches of Gao-style baguazhang will refer to their art as "Guanghua baguazhang", which refers to Guanghua Mountain, from whence hailed the legendary Daoist teacher Song Yiren (who Gao claimed to have learned his houtian 64 palms from). This is the preferred terminology and oral history among the Wu Mengxia and Zhang Junfeng branches.

Guanghua baguazhang as practiced in the Wu Mengxia line consists of 108 "major exercises".. a number with numerological and cosmological significance (108 beads on a mala, 108 stars in ziwei doushu).

4 Main Divisions: ben (本), jie (解), cai (拆), bian (变).

1. Practices in xiantian (pre-heaven) for building up the body is ben.
2. Practices in houtian (post- heaven) is for applications & fighting techniques is jie.
3. Practices in two person sets is cai,
4. Practices for free sparring using the bagua once learned is bian.

The xiantian section of the art includes:

1. four postures training( stand, walk, leaning, lay down)
2. Single palm change (Dan Huan Zhang)
3. Eight Big changes (Ba Mu Zhang), which are divided into four animal changes and four body changes
4. Wulongbaiwei or five Dragons Changes (also called five dragons wave tails)

Guanghua Bagua in the Wu Mengxia line does not have the eight "static" or neigong palms found in many Cheng-based baguazhang styles).

The houtian section of the art includes:

1. 10 tiangan (Ten Heavenly Stems - developmental and power training exercises)
2. 64 houtian Palms - tactical fighting movements
3. 12 Di Zhi (12 Animal forms - which are different than Xingyiquan's 12 animals)
4. eight Tang Chan Zhang (eight sticky palms)

Additionally there are also has 108 classic songs for the system to complement the 108 major movements.

Significant amounts of theory, such as the Eight Powers (Ba Gang), Three Basins (upright, slanting, flat) and the Five Elements for each basin are also included in the Wu Mengxia line (and other lines may contain these elements also).

== See also ==
- Neijia
- Neigong
- Neijin
- Chinese martial arts
