= Yin-yang-style baguazhang =

Chinese martial art

Tian Family's Yin Yang Style Baguazhang
- Also known as: Yin-Yang Ba Gua Zhang
- Hardness: Internal (neijia)
- Country of origin: China
- Creator: Bi Yun / Pi Jiang & Jing Yun / Jing Jiang
- Famous practitioners: Tian Houjie (student of Bi Yun & Jing Yun), Tian Hui, Tian Keyan, Lu Zijian (student of Tian Hui)
- Parenthood: Baguazhang
- Olympic sport: No

The Tian family's Yin Yang Style of the martial art baguazhang (simplified Chinese: 阴阳八卦掌; traditional Chinese: 陰陽八卦掌) originated in the area around the Ermei and Qingzhen Mountains of Sichuan province in China.

== History ==
It was transmitted from the Daoists Bi Yun and Jing Yun during late Ming Dynasty and early Qing Dynasty. Tian Hui (田廻) was the ninth-generation-continuator and made contributions on revealing, organizing and practicing Bagua Zhang, spreading promoting, and writing books of Yin Yang Bagua Zhang to the public. The works "Python form palms" (蟒形掌) and "Lion form palms" (狮形掌) in Tian family's Yin Yang Bagua Zhang are part of the "Chinese Wushu Literati Archive" series, and included in the "China's Wushu Complete Encyclopedia". Mr. Tian Keyan (田克延), the tenth-generation-continuator, did in-depth research and exploration on the theories and combat techniques and formed a complete theoretical system of teaching.

== Features ==
Tian family's Yin Yang Bagua Zhang is one of three main Bagua Zhang systems in China. It integrates the crane-walking and roc-spanning powers, the soft and hard, uplifting, elegant, impressive and graceful styles.

Tian family's Yin Yang Bagua Zhang is the martial arts styled as twisting, spanning, sitting and lifting. This style integrates offense with defense and combines the internal with the external. The origin of this style occurred when the Chinese ancestors combined the "Book of Changes" (易经) with the Yin Yang truth. Following the Eight Trigrams, they observed the actions of animals and environmental changes. Tian family's Yin Yang Bagua Zhang was created from these observations being studied and practiced over several generation.

The practice routines is divided into eight forms: Python, Lion, Tiger, Bear, Snake, Horse, Monkey and Eagle. "Ba" means eight, "Gua" means form, and "Zhang" means palm. One "Zhang" palm is divided into eight postures. Each posture is divided into three different "Cheng" movements. The total is one hundred and ninety-two Chengs. Each Gua is clearly distinctive. The style of Tian family's Yin Yang Bagua Zhang is integrated with the soft and the hard, powerful and majestic—transmitting China's exquisite traditional culture. Tian family's Yin Yang Bagua Zhang took the meaning of Yin Yang and the Eight Trigrams and applied it to the theories and principles of the palms. The actions of the Yin Yang Bagua Zhang eight forms routine involve the practitioners adjusting the upper, middle and lower sections of their body. The Eight Trigrams are eight different symbols: Qian (乾), Kan (坎), Gen (艮), Zhen (震), Xun (巽), Li (离), Kun (坤), and Dui (兑) which correspond to and form the changing ways of the Yin and Yang and the Bagua. The postures of crane walking and eagle spanning also correspond to the eight directions: East, West, South, North, Northeast, Northwest, Southeast and Southwest of the Yin and Yang and the Eight Trigrams. The movements also mimic the arc in the Yin Yang Fish. There are eight characters, eight directions, eight body sections, eight steps, eight posture palms, eight energies and eight coincidences.

== Eight posture-palms ==
=== Python Form ===
The Python Form Palms of Tian's family Yin Yang Bagua Zhang consists of eight postures:

1. "Python writhing through the forest"
2. "Python bending, ground stomping",
3. "Python grabbing, crossing and piercing",
4. "Python wandering, crossing with a single arm"
5. "Python bending, crossing with a crooked arm"
6. "Python writhing and piercing"
7. "Python cleaving, spanning and lashing"
8. "Python writhing, rocking, bending and crossing"

Each posture has 3 Chengs and total is 24 Chengs. The Python Form Palms routine is divided into two parts and each part includes four postures.
The characteristics of the Python Form Palms: turning waist and spanning arms, integrated with the soft and the hard. It is like a python coming out of a hole and writhing through the forest.

=== Lion Form ===
The Lion Form Palms of Tian's family Yin Yang Bagua Zhang consists of eight postures:

1. "Lion turning, spanning and cleaving"
2. "Lion turning, grazing and seizing"
3. "Lion turning, spanning and parrying"
4. "Lion turning, grazing and slicing"
5. "Lion turning, cleaving and flicking"
6. "Lion turning, reeling and flicking",
7. "Lion turning, cloud-reeling and ramming"
8. "Lion turning, reeling and slicing"

Each posture has 3 Chengs and total is 24 Chengs. The Lion Form Palms routine is divided into two parts and each part includes four postures.
The characteristics of the Lion Form Palms: the movements are smooth, dynamic, powerful. It is like a lion playing with a ball, and intimidation.

=== Tiger Form ===
The Tiger Form Palms of Tian's family Yin Yang Bagua Zhang consists of eight postures:

1. "Tiger swaying, body-rocking, pulling and pouncing"
2. "Tiger bending, turning, striking, hooking, hanging"
3. "Tiger pouncing, draping, shaking and sending"
4. "Tiger sitting, suppressing, striking, spanning and bending"
5. "Tiger ramming, sweeping, stomping, swinging and spanning"
6. "Tiger carrying, turning, bending and body turning"
7. "Tiger lashing, spanning, bending and horizontal sweeping"
8. "Tiger crossing, raising and body swinging"

Each posture has 3 Chengs and the total is 24 Chengs. The Tiger Form Palms routine is divided into two parts and each part includes four postures.
The characteristics of the Tiger Form Palms: the movements are powerful and mighty. It is like a hungry tiger preying and smashing.

=== Bear Form ===
The Bear Form Palms of Tian's family Yin Yang Bagua Zhang consists of eight postures:

1. "Bear backing, choking and reaching"
2. "Bear backing, spanning, bending and striking"
3. "Bear backing, spanning, covering and ground stomping"
4. "Bear backing, rocking and striking"
5. "Bear backing, spanning, cleaving and striking"
6. "Bear backing, swaying and striking"
7. "Bear backing, body swinging and striking"
8. "Bear backing, turning, ramming and striking"

Each posture has 3 Chengs and the total is 24 Chengs. The bear form palms routine is divided into two parts and each part includes four postures.
The characteristics of the Bear Form Palms: turning its waist and bending its back, having bold and vigorous power. It is like a black bear flexing back, rolling, and pouncing.

=== Snake Form ===
The Snake Form Palms of Tian's family Yin Yang Bagua Zhang consists of eight postures:

1. "Snake bending, arm swaying, crossing and piercing"
2. "Snake thrusting, arm flipping and body turning"
3. "Snake drilling, arm turning and body swinging"
4. "Snake reeling, arm swinging, spanning and bending"
5. "Snake coiling, twisting, spanning and sitting"
6. "Snake flicking, rocking, turning and bending"
7. "Snake lashing, flicking, wrapping and spanning"
8. "Snake wandering, spanning, reeling and body roving"

Each posture has 3 Chengs and the total is 24 Chengs. The Snake Form Palms routine is divided into two parts and each part includes four postures.
The characteristics of the Snake Form Palms: coiling and drilling power, mixing the hard and the soft. The movements are like a snake wandering and darting fangs.

=== Horse Form ===
The Horse Form Palms of Tian's family Yin Yang Bagua Zhang consists of eight postures:

1. "Horse walking, slicing and raising"
2. "Horse sweeping and body swinging"
3. "Horse ramming, turning and bending"
4. "Horse bending and hooking"
5. "Horse neighing, push kicking and stomping"
6. "Horse digging and body roving"
7. "Horse bucking, raising and hitting"
8. "Horse rushing, charging and stomping".

Each posture has 3 Chengs and the total is 24 Chengs. The Horse Form Palms routine is divided into two parts and each part includes four postures.
The characteristics of the horse form palms: the movements are bold and uninhibited, like a wild horse bucking and rushing.

=== Monkey Form ===
The Monkey Form Palms of Tian's family Yin Yang Bagua Zhang consists of eight postures:

1. "Monkey picking fruits"
2. "Monkey presenting fruits"
3. "Monkey guarding fruits"
4. "Monkey playing with fruits"
5. "Monkey showing palms"
6. "Monkey showing arms"
7. "Monkey stepping on branch"
8. "Monkey circling palms"

Each posture has 3 Chengs and the total is 24 Chengs. The Monkey Form Palms routine is divided into two parts and each part includes four postures.
The characteristics of the Monkey Form Palms: the movements are nimble and it has adorable looks. It is like a monkey playing and guarding its catch.

=== Eagle Form ===
The Eagle Form Palms of Tian's family Yin Yang Bagua Zhang consists of eight postures:

1. "Eagle slicing, wing spreading and launching"
2. "Eagle spanning, bending, turning, pressing and covering"
3. "Eagle stretching, spanning, reeling, bending and turning"
4. "Eagle retracting, arm stretching and hooking"
5. "Eagle bucking, spanning, turning and body roving"
6. "Eagle spanning, twisting, turning and body roving"
7. "Eagle slapping, arm swinging, push kicking and stomping"
8. "Eagle turning, swinging, spanning and body turning"

Each posture has 3 Chengs and the total is 24 Chengs. The Eagle Form Palms routine is divided into two parts and each part includes four postures.
The characteristics of the Eagle Form Palms: the movements are open and natural. It has the vigor to combat the elements and disdaining the firmament, and has the spirit of soaring the sky and spanning in the empyrean.
