= Hung I-Hsiang =

Taiwanese martial artist (1925–1993)

洪懿祥 Hong Yixiang
- Hung I-Hsiang (left) demonstrates with a student Qin Ming-shan in the 1970s.
- Born: 1925; Taiwan
- Died: 1993 (aged 67–68)
- Style: Guo Shu-style tai chi; Xingyiquan; Gao Style Baguazhang; Shaolin kung fu; Qigong
- Teachers: Chang Chun-Feng, Chen Pan Ling

Other information
- Notable school: Tang Shou Tao

Hung I-Hsiang or Hong Yixiang (Chinese: 洪懿祥; pinyin: Hóng Yìxiáng) (1925–1993) was a Taiwanese martial artist who specialized in the internal Chinese styles of xingyiquan, baguazhang, and taijiquan.

== Biography ==
Hung I-Hsiang was born in Taiwan into a wealthy merchant family in the Dihua district of Taipei. He commenced his training of martial art in elementary school during the Japanese colonial period studying kendo and judo as well has the Southern Shaolin style of Crane Boxing passed down within his family. This cemented his lifelong interest in and commitment to training. As a teenager, his father arranged his study with several local Southern Shaolin stylists. His first exposure to internal martial art was Yang style Taijiquan under Master Tu (Chinese: 涂師傅), a Taiwanese teacher who had studied in Mainland China. He subsequently studied with Chang Chun-Feng (Chinese: 張俊峰; pinyin: Zhang Junfeng), a master of internal Chinese martial arts from Northern China. Chang introduced these arts to Taiwan in 1948, when he moved there following the Chinese Communist Revolution. Initially, Chang was met with resistance from mainlanders on Taiwan who objected to his teaching the secrets of internal martial arts to native Taiwanese such as Hung.

With the mass exodus of mainland Chinese to Taiwan in 1949, the Hung family compound became known as a refuge for destitute martial artists. In the decade following, Hung Yi-hsiang was exposed to the teachings of these fighters from various styles.

When Chang began teaching in the northern part of Taipei, his first group of core students included the three Hung brothers: Hung I-Hsiang, Hung I-Wen, and Hung I-Mien. According to the Hung family, Hung I-Wen specialized in xingyiquan, boxing theory, longevity exercises and Chinese medicine, Hung I-Mien was the baguazhang specialist, while Hung I-Hsiang mastered the 3 internal arts of xingyiquan, baguazhang, and taijiquan.

After he had studied with Chang for several years, Hung often led classes for Chang. Because the internal martial arts were still very new in Taiwan, many curious people would come to test Chang's skill. Hung said that Chang would often send him out to show the visitors what the internal styles were all about. Many martial artists in Taiwan remember Hung as being someone who was involved in many fights, both in and out of the martial arts studio.

Besides Chang Chun-Feng, Hung also studied in depth with Chen Pan-Ling in the 99 taijiquan form and benefited from Chen's comments on his xingyiquan and baguazhang.

In the mid-1960s, Hung I-Hsiang opened up his own school under the name Yizong Tang Shou Tao. In the 1970s, Hung's Tang Shou Tao school reportedly had well over 200 students, including people foreigners from outside of Taiwan.

Hung I-Hsiang internal arts training program included xingyiquan, baguazhang and taijiquan, Shaolin kung fu, and qigong. He suggests that students learn Shaolin kung fu when they are very young, progress to xingyiquan to learn how to develop internal power, and then progress to baguazhang and tai chi to learn how to refine the power. This is also the teaching sequence used by Hung's teacher, Chang Chun-Feng. Hung believed that in practicing the xingyiquan five elements as an introduction to the internal martial arts, the student can clearly understand the way the body should be trained to move in the internal styles. If the student starts out in tai chi, it is very difficult to develop and understand internal power.

Many of Hung's students dominated the full-contact tournaments in Taiwan. One student, Weng Hsien-ming, won the Taiwan full contact championships three years in a row. Although he was thin and short, but won through his clever use of internal martial art skills. Another, Huang Hsi-I, also usually won his all-Taiwan full contact tournaments with knock-outs.
