= Cheng-style baguazhang =

Cheng Style Baguazhang (程氏八卦掌)
- Hardness: Internal (neijia)
- Country of origin: China
- Creator: Cheng Tinghua
- Famous practitioners: Sun Lutang (founder of Sun Style Baguazhang), Jiang Rong Qiao (founder of Jiang Style Baguazhang), Gao Yisheng (founder of Gao Style Baguazhang), Sun Zhijun
- Parenthood: Baguazhang, Shuaijiao
- Descendant arts: Gao Style Baguazhang, Jiang Style Baguazhang, Sun Style Baguazhang
- Olympic sport: No

Cheng Style Baguazhang is the style of Baguazhang descended from Cheng Tinghua, the fourth disciple of Baguazhang's founder, Dong Haichuan (Yin Fu was the first, followed by Ma Weiqi and Shi Jidong).

Cheng Tinghua was from Shen County; he later moved to Beijing where he had an eyeglasses shop located next to the Fire Spirit Temple on Si Shuai Street in the Flower Market Plaza. Therefore, he was called Eyeglasses Cheng.

During the Boxer Rebellion (July 1900) Cheng swore to defend his country from the enemy. One day, around the government buildings near the Yong Ding Gate, Cheng met ten of the enemy and subdued them all and none dared to advance. The officers were furious, and ordered a large patrol with rifles to surround Cheng. Cheng calmly used piercing palm to evade them. Then he turned around, leaped up on top of a wall and walked away. They did not have pity on him when he was on the wall and he perished in a hail of bullets.

The special characteristics of Cheng Style Baguazhang are:

- The stepping method are the hook step and the swing step. Their qualities are: the hook step must be small, and the swing step must be big.
- The Dragon Claw palm as follows: the thumb is spread wide. The tiger's mouth is curved and pushed up. The second, third and fourth fingers are slightly spread apart. The little finger and the fourth finger are in contact with each other.

Due to Cheng Tinghua's extensive background in shuaijiao throwing techniques before learning baguazhang, Cheng style tends to emphasize throwing techniques, while Yin style tends to emphasize striking techniques. In Yin style bagua, many of the martial applications are evident in the form. Cheng style applications are not as evident, but are equally as powerful.

Each Cheng substyle uses as its technical basis eight basic palms (Badamuzhang 八大母掌), from which more complicated linking forms are derived.

Of the eight basic palms, only the first three (Laosanzhang 老三掌) are considered to be the oldest and passed down by Cheng Tinghua himself before his death in 1900.

These three palms are:

- Single Change Palm (單換掌)
- Double Change Palm (雙換掌)
- Smooth Posture Palm (順勢掌)

Cheng style has many substyles, some of the lineages for which are given below:

- Dong Haichuan
  - Cheng Tinghua
    - Cheng Youlong
      - Sun Xikun
        - Liu Qian
          - Luo Dexiu
    - Liu Ziyang
    - Cheng Youxin
      - Xu Lifang
        - Ma Lincheng
    - Cheng Yousheng
      - Sun Zhijun
    - Yang Mingsheng
      - Wang Rongtang
    - Liu Bin
      - Wang Wenkui
      - Liu Xinghan
    - Sun Lutang
      - Sun Cunzhou
      - Sun Jianyun
    - Li Wenbiao
      - Luo Xingwu
        - Liu Jingru
    - Jiang Rong Qiao
    - Zhou Yuxiang
      - Gao Yisheng
