= Bruce Frantzis =

American martial artist

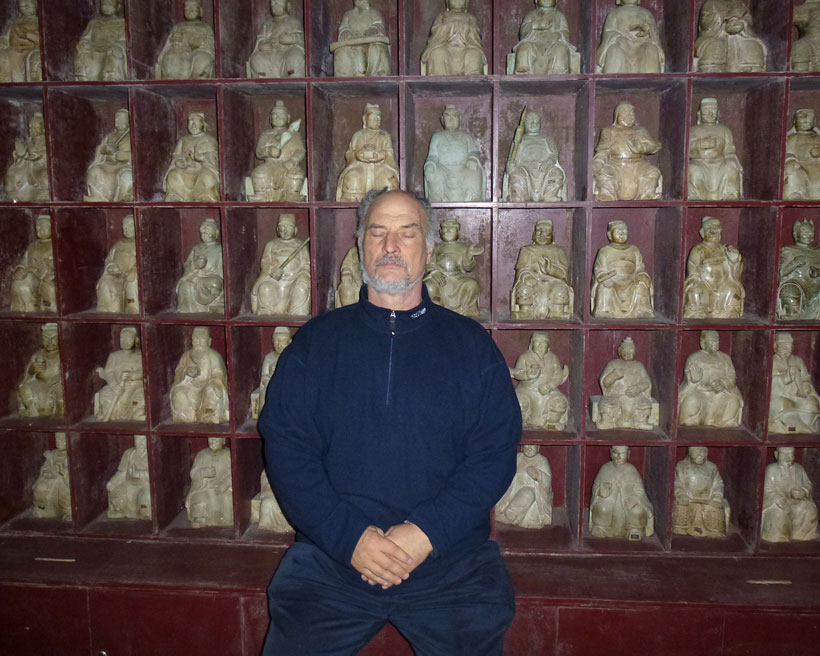
- Born: April 1949 (age 77); New York City
- Occupations: Tai Chi, Meditation and Qigong Teacher and Author
- Known for: Taoist Lineage Master (Liu Hung-Chieh)

Bruce Kumar Frantzis is a Taoist educator.

== Biography ==
Bruce moved to Japan to attend Sophia University at the age of eighteen. There, he obtained multiple black belts and trained with Aikido’s founder Morihei Ueshiba. He soon branched out to Taiwan and China to study internal Chinese martial arts.

In 1973, Bruce traveled to India to train in Pranayama, Hatha yoga, Raja yoga and Tantra, gaining experience with “Kundalini Shakti”.

Returning to China in the mid 1970s, he spent the next seven years training in the Taoist Fire tradition (unverified tradition) and became a priest of it. Next he studied the Water tradition (unverified tradition) under Liu Hung-Chieh. Through Liu Hung-Chieh he was introduced to Jiang Jia Hua the vice president of the All-China Scientific Qigong Association. This connection gave Bruce access to Chinese cancer clinics where he completed his training as Medical Qigong doctor.

Bruce inherited the Taoist Water tradition lineages shortly before Liu-Hung Chieh's passing in 1986. Afterwards the next 25 years of his career pivoted to teaching Taoism to Western societies. He primarily teaches the Energy Arts qigong System, Wu-style tai chi, bagua, Taoist yoga and Taoist meditation. He has authored numerous works (including The Power of the Internal Martial Arts and Chi, Tao of Letting Go, Dragon and Tiger Medical Qigong, and Opening the Energy Gates of Your Body) on Taoist energetic practices and taught over 20,000 students many of whom have gone on to become active certified instructors.

== Authored Books ==
- Opening the Energy Gates of Your Body: Chi Gung for Lifelong Health ISBN 978-1583941461
- The Power of Internal Martial Arts and Chi: Combat and Energy Secrets of Ba Gua, Tai Chi and Hsing-I ISBN 978-1583941904
- Relaxing into Your Being: The Taoist Meditation Tradition of Lao Tse, Volume 1 ISBN 978-1556434075
- The Great Stillness: The Water Method of Taoist Meditation Series, Volume 2 ISBN 978-1556434082
- Tai Chi: Health for Life ISBN 978-1583941447
- The CHI Revolution: Harnessing the Healing Power of Your Life Force ISBN 978-1583941935
- TAO of Letting Go: Meditation for Modern Living ISBN 978-1556438080
- Dragon and Tiger Medical Qigong, Volume 1: Develop Health and Energy in 7 Simple Movements ISBN 978-1556439216
- Dragon and Tiger Medical Qigong, Volume 2: Qi Cultivation Principles and Exercises ISBN 978-1583946619
- Bagua and Tai Chi: Exploring the Potential of Chi, Martial Arts, Meditation and the I Ching ISBN 978-1583943595
- Taoist Sexual Meditation: Connecting Love, Energy and Spirit ISBN 978-1583944950
- The Big Book of Tai Chi: Build health fast in slow motion ISBN 978-0007130900

== Personal life ==
He is a regular participant in the Tibetan Buddhist community, a process that began with his training under Dudjom Rinpoche in 1976. He is an active student of Dzogchen.
