= Yin Fu =

Chinese martial artist (1840–1909)

Yin Fu 尹福
- Born: 1840; China
- Died: 1909 (aged 68–69)
- Style: Baguazhang
- Teacher: Dong Haichuan (董海川)
- Rank: Founder of Yin Style Baguazhang

Other information
- Notable students: Ma Gui

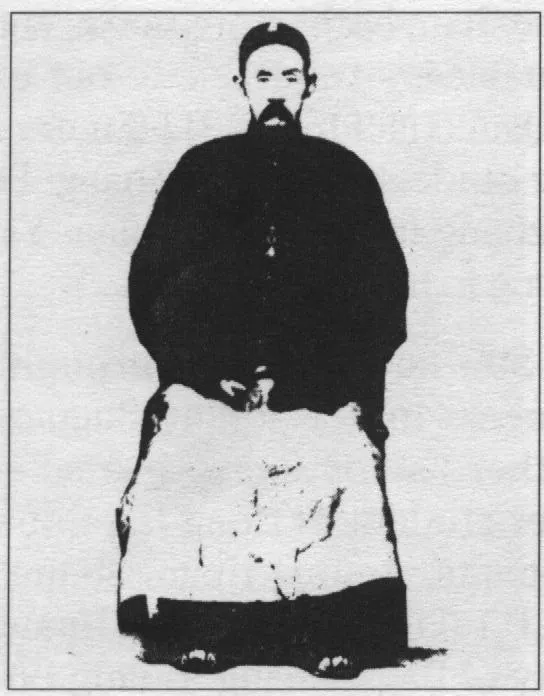
Yin Fu, the student of Dong Hai Chuan and progenitor of Yin Style BaguaZhang

Yin Fu (Chinese: 尹福; pinyin: Yǐn Fú) (Chanhuaicun (漳淮村), Jixian (冀县), China, 1840 – China, June, 1909) was a Baguazhang (a martial art) disciple of Dong Haichuan responsible for the creation of the Yin Style Baguazhang.

Yin Fu was Dong's earliest disciple in Prince Duan's palace. Yin's kungfu skills advanced very fast during the next several years and Duan let Yin join the king's security guards.

When Master Dong retired, Yin took over as the supervisor of the security guards, working for the emperor in the Forbidden City. The Empress Dowager was impressed by his skill and even wanted to study with him.

Yin taught Bagua and lived on the eastern side of Beijing city; as a result, the Yin style of kungfu is called Dong-cheng Zhang (Eastern City Palm). The other name for the Yin style is Niu-she Zhang (Ox Tongue Palm) because the palm's shape in this style looks like an ox tongue. Some Yin style Bagua Zhang schools teach in layers of a few sets of 8 basic palm changes with different strategies applied to the palm changes leading to a multi layered ever changing series of palm changes. Other schools teach 8 palm changes organized in eight sections, each with eight postures. The sixty-four posture palm change is practiced in circle walking.

Later some of Yin's students changed their style. They did eight palm changes as a major practice. This approach is similar to Cheng style Baguazhang.
