= Dong Haichuan =

Chinese martial artist (1797–1882)

董海川 Dong Haichuan
- Born: October 13, 1797 or October 13, 1813; Zhu village, Ju Jia Wu, Wen'an, Hebei, China
- Died: October 25, 1882 (aged 85) or October 25, 1882 (aged 69); Beijing, China
- Nationality: Chinese
- Style: Luohanquan
- Rank: Founder of Baguazhang

Other information
- Notable students: Yin Fu (尹福), Ma Gui (马贵), Cheng Tinghua (程廷华), Liang Zhenpu (梁振蒲)

Dong Haichuan
- Chinese: 董海川
Transcriptions
Standard Mandarin
- Hanyu Pinyin: Dǒng Hǎichuān

Dong Haichuan (13 October 1797 or 1813 – 25 October 1882) is regarded as a skillful martial artist and widely credited to be the founder of Baguazhang. Most, if not all, existing schools of Baguazhang place Dong Haichuan at the beginning of their lineage. Some traditional teachers in China do not regard Dong as the founder, though, merely as the first identified transmitter of Baguazhang knowledge to the wider public. In their opinion, prior to Dong, Baguazhang teaching was conducted behind closed doors from one Taoist to another within Taoist schools.

== Biography ==
He was born on 13 October 1797 or 1813 in Zhu village, Ju Jia Wu Township, Wen'an County, Hebei Province, China. As a child and young man he intensely trained in the martial arts of his village. The arts were probably Shaolin-based and may have included Bafanshan (a possible precursor to Fanziquan), Hongquan, Xingmenquan, and Jingangquan. These were the arts being taught in and around Dong's village at this time. Alternatively, Dong is sometimes said to have learned and practiced Erlangquan or Luohanquan,

Some believe that he consistently taught only the first three of eight palms (Single Change Palm, Double Change Palm and Smooth Body Palm) and that he would vary the last five depending on the individuals' previous martial arts experience. Others believe that he taught considerably more material. It was also in his public teaching period that the art was given the name Baguazhang (Eight tri-gram palm). Baguazhang became popular in Beijing and surrounding areas.

He died on 25 October 1882 in Beijing.

== Students ==
Dong taught Baguazhang to several highly regarded martial artists, notably Fu Zhensong, Yin Fu, Ma Gui, Cheng Tinghua and Liang Zhenpu. Some of these students' names are recorded on his grave.

== Bibliography ==
- Smith, Robert W. "Chinese Boxing", ISBN 1-55643-085-X
- Liang, Shou-Yu; Yang, Jwing-Ming; Wu, Wen-Ching "Baguazhang : Emei Baguazhang Theory and Applications", pp 36–38, ISBN 0-940871-30-0
- Smith, Robert W.; Pittman, Allen "Pa-Kua – Eight Trigram Boxing" pp 19–22, ISBN 0-8048-1618-2

== See also ==
- Neijia
- Neigong
- Neijin
- Chinese martial arts
- Li Ziming
- Sui Yunjiang
