= Neijin =

Internal power in Chinese martial arts

In advanced traditional Chinese kung fu (martial arts), Neijin (Traditional Chinese: 內勁; pinyin: nèijìn) refers to the conscious control of the practitioner's qi, or "life energy" via strengthening self physical posture, to gain power delivery capability and efficiency advantages in combat. Nèijìn is developed by using "Neigong" (Traditional Chinese: 內功; pinyin: nèigōng) (內功), or "internal exercises," as opposed to "wàigōng" (外功), "external exercises."

== Li vs. Neijin ==
Practitioners of kung fu refer to two separate forms of personal force: Li (Traditional Chinese: 力) refers to the more elementary use of tangible physical (or "external") force, such as that produced by muscles. Neijin (Traditional Chinese:內勁) or Neigong (Traditional Chinese: 內功), in contrast, refer to "internal" forces produced via advanced mental control over psychic energy (the qi).

The degree of Li force one can employ in kung fu depends on several variables such as resilience of muscles, strength of bones, speed and timing of attack and so on. An effective way to enhance the Li force is to exercise one's muscles and bones by applying increasing pressure on them (weight training, gym exercises, etc.). The stronger one's muscles and bones become, the more powerful and skillful the level of kung fu is.

On the other hand, the level of the Neijin force depends on the extent one can exercise over one's will power to release an inner qi energy. Within the framework of Chinese martial arts, every person is believed to possess the inborn energy of qi. Martial artists can harness the force of qi so that it is strong enough to be applied in combat. When qi is being directed by one's will, it is called Neijin.

The Li force is observable when it is employed. Unlike the Li force, Neijin is said to be invisible. Both Li and Neijin need the "pivot point", but Neijin is intelligent enough to deliver contact force near muscle force when able to minimize the resistance arm length of self body's mechanical disadvantage lever. At the point of attack, one must ‘song’ (loosen) himself to change the contact force angle and position for proper lever control, to generate all Neijin energy one possesses and to direct this energy stream through one's contact point with an opponent. The contact point only represents the gateway to conduct Neijin energy at the point of attack.

The kung fu component of Li force is limited by one's physical condition. When a person passes his/her prime age, one's kung fu ability will pass the optimum level, too. The degree of kung fu will decline when muscles and bones are not as strong as they used to be. On the other hand, the kung fu aspect of Neijin is said to continually grow as long as one lives and always practices in lever control.

== Net force and lever control ==
Self controllable physical elements in martial art include: mass, muscle strength, and lever

Neijin needs net force control to maximize the force constraint based on one's muscle strength training and lever control to maximize the muscle force delivery efficiency. The following joint safety is also important for Neijin:

1. For extension, reserve flexion angle and prevent overextension. All extended strikes, whether they successfully hit the opponent or are unexpectedly redirected by them, must be quickly retracted to continue maintaining defense, evasion, and readiness for the next strike.

2. For active strike or push-pull contact actions, keep parallel relation between shoulder/hip torque and elbow/knee pivot, and avoid perpendicular relation(only able for defense posture or slipping direction adjustment) between them for forearm/palm and lower leg/sole not to be controlled.

=== Net force control ===
Whatever one is going to strike, block or dodge(away from opponent or perpendicular to the distance between one and opponent), the following force sources for temporary self body mass or momentum increase can resist, stop the effect of contact force applied by opponent and even control self body's net force actively:

- self weight
- ground friction
- normal reaction forces from standing ground and holding wall, handrail, and opponent body

Since the coefficient of friction changes with the environment, frictional force becomes unstable. Direct normal force is more reliable and allows muscular strength to be exerted more effectively. If one can only rely on ground friction, the following short‑term conditions must be met in order to maximize impact force close to the limit of ground friction:

- Assuming the ground is not wet or slippery, the preferred method of pushing off is first with the heel and then naturally with the forefoot. The secondary option is to use the forefoot directly. This reduces the chance of ankle joint misalignment or tendon strain.
- The rear foot serves as the driving foot relying on friction, while the front foot acts as the braking foot. First use the iliopsoas muscle or the forefoot to push against the ground and lift the braking foot, allowing the driving foot and the body’s center of gravity to lean freely. This prevents excessive pressure on the ankle, excessive pulling of the hip and thigh tendons, or unexpected calf cramps, thereby safely accelerating the center of gravity.
- At the moment when imbalance causes the center of gravity to nearly topple, the ground‑contact position of the limb and the tilt of the body’s center of gravity directly affect the speed and direction of the center of gravity’s propulsion when that limb pushes off.
- While the center of gravity is accelerating and the braking foot has not yet landed, use the hand or foot to strike in a straight line close to the direction of forward movement. This raises the impact force to approach muscular strength, or even approach the limit of ground friction. Regardless of whether the strike lands, the striking limb must be quickly retracted. Then, using the iliopsoas and gluteal muscles, control the braking foot so that the whole sole or ankle lands first (reducing the risk of sprains from improper landing on uneven ground). Continue maintaining defense and prepare for the next strike.

Additionally, in any state where one’s own free fall or projectile motion is intentionally or unintentionally triggered, the following points must be noted:

- In such a state, the greatest or only net force source is gravity.
- The predetermined trajectory of the projectile motion cannot be changed until landing, touching, or colliding with an external object, whether expected or unexpected.

=== Lever control ===
Since effort arm length formed by muscle attachment and relevant leverage joint is short and fixed, when one is able to maintain the best mechanical disadvantage lever with the following two conditions by minimizing resistance arm in terms of pivot joints (e.g, center of gravity, shoulder and hip, elbow and knee), the contact force can be near the muscle force:

1. Minimize the direction difference between net force control, contact force and pivot joints movements

2. Minimize the perpendicular distance between the paths of net force control, contact force and pivot joints movements

The worst mechanical disadvantage lever, which violates the two conditions and lengthens the resistance arm to make contact force significantly lower than the muscle force, should be avoided in self body. With proper limb strike/catch angle and timing, keeping the best mechanical disadvantage lever to control opponent's worst mechanical disadvantage lever by maximizing their resistance arm will take the best mechanical advantage lever. Therefore, one's longer arm span (wingspan or reach) or leg length allows longer striking distance, but also allows opponent to take longer effort arm for destabilizing in striking or controlling in grappling if one's corresponding muscles are not strong enough to resist. Besides, self body creating mechanical advantage lever involves combining own limbs, allowing the direction of combined force to be changed at any time (direct normal force is preferable). This maintains one limb with a shorter resistance arm to push or pull another limb with a longer resistance arm, a method commonly seen in grappling or throwing techniques as auxiliary locking or suppression maneuvers.

Through these control methods, nutritional intake can be transferred efficiently to Neijin.

== Sports example ==
The Neijin physical body structures with best self body mechanical disadvantage lever can be seen in following sports examples:

- Hands and legs in series(net force control and contact force are near parallel to spine)
- Hands in series(net force control and contact force are near parallel to shoulders distance)
- Hands and legs in parallel
- Hands in parallel
- Legs in parallel

The above exercise examples not only allow one to experience the concepts of joint safety in internal force and the optimization of leverage to reduce wasted muscular effort, but they can also be extended to the level of mechanical operation to appreciate the convenience of using transport tools to assist human labor. For instance, a handcart can replace manual carrying, a forklift can further use energy to drive transportation, and drones can go even further with remote control operation. However, because the leverage effects of tools or machines directly challenge material endurance and balance control, accidents and injuries may occur. Therefore, it is essential to establish and follow safety operating guidelines, strengthen awareness of mechanical safety, and enforce licensing systems to reduce the risk of accidents.

== Lever in striking techniques (without capture) ==
Striking techniques generally employ evasion and blocking. These not only reduce the opponent’s chance of striking one when one is in a weaker leverage state, but also increase one own chance of striking the opponent when they are in a weaker leverage state, potentially causing them to lose balance. Among these, the flexion and extension angles of hinge joints such as the elbow and knee, and their relationship to internal force leverage distance, have different tactical functions:

1. Elbow/knee joint at or greater than a right angle

- Commonly used in straight punch, pushing palm, ulna near elbow strike, pushing kick/side kick, tibia near knee strike, or positional evasion.
- The distance between the contact force point and the shoulder/hip becomes nearly parallel to the direction of applied force (short resistance arm), placing the body in a stronger leverage state.
- However, when the distance becomes nearly perpendicular to the direction of applied force (long resistance arm), placing the body in a weaker leverage state. The limb is farther from the body’s center of gravity or shoulder–hip structure, making the forearm or lower leg as vulnerable as the head to strikes or suppression. Therefore, extended limbs must be quickly retracted to maintain defense and prepare for the next attack.

General safety principle for joint strikes or pulls:

- The pillar closer to the body’s center of gravity and the pillar farther away should form a near-right angle.
- Use the part of the farther pillar closer to the joint for pulling, striking, or pressing.
- The closer pillar should align parallel to the direction of force.

Since bone structures withstand parallel forces better than perpendicular ones due to the flexural strength, these techniques emphasize straight-line pushing or pulling, shortening the resistance arm and making contact force closer to muscle strength while safer. Curved strikes with nearly straight elbow/knee (e.g., whip punch, whip kick) require safety considerations:

- Need acceleration to generate momentum, targeting non-bone areas or weaker skeletal leverage states to be effective.
- This posture increases the resistance arm distance to lower the muscle strength delivery efficiency via contact point. Even in the same contact force level, the posture will consume more muscle strength and make opponent's suppression easier compared to straight strikes.
- The ulna and tibia are sharp with small impact areas but high pressure, lacking muscle cushioning. Bone-to-bone collisions during sweeping rotations risk fractures for both attacker and defender.
- Unexpected collisions with upper arm or thigh can cause dislocation injuries at the elbow or knee.
- Using the back of the hand/foot in sweeping strikes risks nerve damage and tendon sprains in the wrist or ankle.

2. Elbow/knee joint less than a right angle

- Commonly used for protecting the body and head while preparing to strike.
- Also used in elbow/knee strikes (as long as shoulder/hip joints are not overextended, both straight and curved strikes are safer than fully extended ones, though strike angles must be controlled to avoid nerve injury).
- This posture is less vulnerable to strikes or suppression due to short resistance arm.

Before opportunities to escape or capture arise, one must consistently evade and protect the head and body to reduce injury risk and severity. Evasion involves moving away from the opponent’s direction or at a right angle to the direct line between oneself and the opponent, increasing the chance that the opponent’s attack misses or glances off. Adding hand/leg pushes against the opponent’s weaker leverage state (e.g, leg, head or chin) can further disrupt their balance, hindering their attack and improving escape chances. For capture or suppression, two conditions should occur simultaneously to increase success:

- The opponent’s limb pillar should align at a right angle to one’s line of sight for easier sensory judgment and body reaction.
- One’s forearm should contact the opponent’s limb pillar at a right angle for better control.

== Lever in grappling techniques (with capture) ==
Grabbing limbs works by obstructing the opponent’s ability to coordinate multiple limbs while enhancing self own limb cooperation, thereby altering the original leverage structure of the arms and legs to facilitate the use of Neijin:

1. Grabbing the opponent’s limb

- Using joint locks or certain technical throws does not require bearing most of the opponent’s weight. Instead, it relies on pulling with the hands combined with pushing from other hands, legs, or tibia near knee, pulling with the hands while using external objects to obstruct the opponent’s limbs or using own weight to imbalance opponent.
- This cooperation of multiple limbs forces the opponent’s single limb into a disadvantageous leverage state, while one can gain a more efficient leverage advantage, causing the opponent to lose balance and be subdued or thrown.
- Other strength-based throws require squatting or deadlift ability. Only when the opponent’s center of gravity is forced closer to one’s own, or nearly aligned vertically, so one can bear most or all of their body weight for leading to suppression or a throw.

Principle for effectively suppressing the opponent’s joint structures (to reduce their chance of continuing attacks):

- If a pillar-like object is to be prevented from rotating in a certain dimension, its surfaces near both ends must receive two forces in the same direction, while any point between those ends must receive one force in the opposite direction. The sum of the two same-direction forces must equal the opposite force.
- Applying this principle to the elbow or knee (one-dimensional rotational joints with angular limits)
- Using only the hands/legs, or the hands/legs together (only emphasize near the palm/sole or the elbow/knee of opponent) with other body parts, or the hands/legs together (only emphasize near the palm/sole or the elbow/knee of opponent) with external objects, force is applied at two positions — the forearm/lower leg near the palm/sole, and the elbow/knee — simultaneously exerting push-and-pull forces at right angles to the opponent’s limb, causing it to stretch.
- These push-and-pull forces act parallel and combine to draw the opponent’s chest toward a wall or the ground.
- As a result, the force on the opponent’s elbow or knee equals the sum of the applied force on their forearm/lower leg and the external force on their shoulder/hip (wall pressure, ground reaction against gravity, or their own body weight). This prevents the elbow or knee from contracting, disabling further attacks.

2. Grabbing one’s own limb

The only way to create advantage lever using one’s own limbs is by combining multiple limbs into a more solid structure to neutralize joint locks or throws that rely on grabbing the opponent’s limb as a prerequisite. In other words, it dismantles the opponent’s multi‑limb combination (their own leverage creation), or at least reduces the number of opponent’s limbs simultaneously grabbing the same limb of one’s. Also, this method can be used as a circular lock on parts of the opponent’s body or as a suppression technique. The most common forms include: forearms or lower legs gripping each other at the wrists/ankles, the elbow crook locking with the wrist/forearm, or the knee crook locking with the ankle/lower leg.

If the practitioner’s technique can simultaneously achieve the following three conditions, it will be difficult for the locked person to break the combined/interlocked limb structure using only pushing or pulling with their arms and legs:

- The locked person’s limbs cannot reach the practitioner’s wrist/forearm or ankle/lower leg that are not involved in the interlock.
- The locked person’s limbs cannot insert into any gaps within the practitioner’s interlocked limbs, and therefore cannot generate direct normal force to trigger leverage resistance.
- All of the practitioner’s wrists/forearms or ankles/lower legs involved in the interlock are tightly gripping stable positions.

Since physically both the grabber and the grabbed are mutually capturing each other, adding a push at this moment produces greater force than pushing without being grabbed. Therefore, when necessary, one can add leg power to push against the opponent for repelling and breaking free.

== Lever of weapons ==
Holding hard or soft weapons with both hands, regardless of whether their shapes are naturally formed or deliberately designed, shares a common principle with the extension of arms and legs. The length is proportional to the thrusting distance. At the same time, it is proportional to the possible resistance arm length. This results in an inverse relationship with leverage suppression ability.

Without considering material strength, using direct normal force at the gripping point can withstand impact or suppression more effectively and stably than relying on friction. Only then internal force can be properly applied.

=== Hard Weapons ===
When both hands tightly grip the same hard weapon, there are three leverage methods. Using a staff for horizontal striking as an example (excluding the staff’s own weight factors), and with both hands gripping anywhere between the two ends:

1. Chest push or back pull with the staff

- Push or pull perpendicular to the staff between the two grip points.
- Strike force equals the sum of both hands’ push or pull.
- If the hand spacing is about shoulder width, the strike force aligns more closely with core muscles (chest, back).

2. Two-handed thrusting with the staff

- Apply force at the tip of the staff, parallel to its length.
- Strike force equals the sum of both hands’ push or pull.
- If the staff is close to the shoulders, the force aligns with core muscles (chest, back, shoulders).
- However, because the hands must withstand friction, excessive thrusting force may cause loss of grip.

3. Two-handed sweeping with the staff

- Strike perpendicular to the staff outside the two grip points.
- In rotation, strike force changes depending on grip spacing.
- If the distance between the hands is less than the distance from the strike point to the nearer hand, the strike force is less than half of that nearer hand’s force. However, with the same contact force, a smaller contact surface still generates greater pressure.
- If the distance between the hands is greater than the distance from the strike point to the nearer hand, the strike force is more than half of that nearer hand’s force.

With one hand gripping, only thrusting and sweeping techniques are possible. In addition to friction limits in thrusting, wrist and finger strength training is crucial to reduce injury risk during sweeping.

General principle for hard weapons: If the tip can be inserted into a gap in an external object, that gap can serve as a temporary fulcrum. This allows the weapon’s length to form an mechanical advantage lever, amplifying internal force to pry open or remove obstacles more easily.

=== Soft Weapons ===
When both hands tightly grip the same soft weapon, there are two methods. Using a rope for horizontal striking as an example (excluding the rope’s own weight factors), and with both hands gripping anywhere between the two ends:

1. Two-handed pulling with the rope

- Apply force along the rope’s length at any point, pushing or pulling.
- Contact force equals the sum of both hands’ push or pull.
- If the rope is close to the shoulders, the force aligns with core muscles (chest, back, shoulders).
- However, because the hands must withstand friction, excessive pulling force may cause loss of grip.

2. One-handed or two-handed swinging with the rope

- Strike perpendicular to the rope’s length at any point.
- Technical limitation is that effective rope strikes require tangential acceleration over time to reach sufficient speed.
- Regardless of whether the rotating rope is parallel or perpendicular to the forearm, the acceleration direction is nearly perpendicular to the forearm. This means the acceleration path is far from leverage points like the elbow, shoulder, or body center, forming a significant disadvantage lever.
- Air resistance requires continuous tangential acceleration to maintain or increase rope speed; otherwise, it will naturally slow down.
- After impact, unlike a staff, the rope cannot continuously apply force for suppression. Tangential acceleration must be repeated for each strike, making this technique physically demanding and technically challenging.
- Because the hands must withstand friction, excessive centripetal force during rope rotation may cause loss of grip.

== Methods and difficulties in evaluating internal force ==
The strength of internal force and muscular force is commonly expressed through the size of contact force to estimate muscle strength. However, accurately evaluating internal force has the following methods and limitations:

1. Vertical contact force (involving gravity, counterbalanced by ground reaction force)

- While falling or crashing down on the opponent, the downward contact force exerted equals one’s body weight plus muscular force. In this case, body weight becomes an auxiliary to force generation. It shows that even without muscular effort, body weight alone can produce contact force on the opponent. Therefore, such techniques are difficult for evaluating the strength of internal force, and it may be impossible to determine whether muscular strength was used. Nonetheless, they are strategic techniques in martial arts physical application.
- While squat-style lifting the opponent, the upward contact force generated by pushing against the ground is reduced by one’s own body weight. Thus, body weight becomes a burden to force generation. This technique is suitable for directly evaluating internal force strength or for physical training. In occupational safety, lifting objects is an important topic and often used as a safety reminder. However, for martial arts application, this is not an ideal stamina-efficient technique.

2. Horizontal contact force (no gravity involvement; relies on friction or reaction force from objects)

- When both sides generate impact without external support, each relies only on ground friction. Assuming equal friction coefficients (same shoes, same surface), and both can match muscular force with impact force:
- If one’s body weight is less than the opponent’s, even with much stronger trained muscles, once the impact force exceeds the ground friction one can sustain, one will be pushed backward.
- Even if one can fully exert high-level trained muscle strength to overcome the opponent’s friction, the result will be that the lighter person retreats a long distance while the heavier opponent retreats only a short distance.
- If one applies contact force while holding onto a solid external structure, body weight is temporarily increased, making it easier to fully exert trained muscle strength. Once the opponent’s ground friction is overcome, the opponent retreats while the person applying force often remains unmoved.
- Ultimately, only the trained individual knows whether their training intensity has surpassed the required contact force. Observers, without precise friction-testing instruments and proper materials, can only confirm that muscular force was used to strike and move the opponent.
- If the successful striker is lighter, estimation is roughly based on the heavier opponent’s weight retreating.
- If the successful striker is heavier, estimation is roughly based on the retreat distance of the lighter opponent.

From these methods and limitations, it is clear that martial arts skills involving internal force and physical application are difficult to evaluate accurately without precise instruments.

Additionally, some individuals have muscle attachments farther from the relevant leverage joints than average. This creates longer effort arms, meaning the impact force they generate against an opponent may exceed their actual muscular strength. As a result, internal force evaluation may overestimate such individuals’ muscle power.

== Training concepts ==
Regular nutrition and training are the main components to strengthen Neijin.

=== Nutritional intake ===
Healthy eating and excretion habits should be kept as regular as possible before exercise, it is important to ensure that most or all toxins have been eliminated to prevent prolonged reabsorption and negative effects. This allows the body to rely primarily on the day's nutritional intake to support training and recovery.

=== Sports training ===
Regardless of whether the training goal is martial application or physical conditioning, one should maintain the habit of exhaling during force exertion and inhaling during recovery or preparation, so that breathing and muscular activity remain as coordinated as possible.

The key to unlock and nurture Neijin is said to be the practice of ‘song’ (Traditional Chinese: 鬆 ). The term ‘song’ can function as a verb which means to keep one's mind and body loose resilient and expanding like the consistency of cotton or clouds or relaxed yet concentrated like the sharp alertness of cats immediately before attack. The term can also be used as an adjective which has the same meaning as described above. The greater the extent one can achieve ‘song’ and minimize the use of Li, the greater the release of Neijin force.

Neijin trainees are often reminded to refrain from using the Li force, because the energy of Neijin will be locked and blocked whenever the Li force is applied. So, Neijin and Li are said to be mutually exclusive.

The Taijiquan master Yang Chengfu used the concept of ‘song’ as a benchmark in his daily teaching. It was his daily routine to keep reminding his disciples to ‘song’ thoroughly more than 10 times when he inspected them.

== See also ==
- Neijia
