= Baguazhang =

Chinese martial art

Baguazhang 八卦掌
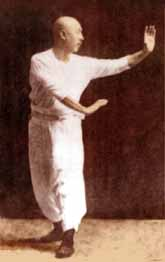
- Zhang Zhaodong, also known as Zhang Zhankui, performing Baguazhang
- Also known as: Baguaquan or Bagua
- Hardness: Internal (neijia)
- Country of origin: China
- Creator: Dong Haichuan (attributed)
- Famous practitioners: Yin Fu; Cheng Tinghua; Ma Gui; Liang Zhenpu; Fu Zhensong; Gao Yisheng; Jiang Rongqiao; Sun Lutang
- Olympic sport: No

Baguazhang (Chinese: 八卦掌; pinyin: bā guà zhǎng; Wade–Giles: pa-kua chang) is one of the three main Chinese martial arts of the so called 內家拳 NèiJiāQuán (neijia), the other two being tai chi and xingyiquan. Baguazhang literally means "eight trigram palm", referring to the bagua "trigrams" of the Yijing, one of the canons of Daoism.

== History ==
The creation of baguazhang as a formalized martial art is attributed to Dong Haichuan, who is said to have learned it from Taoist and Buddhist masters in the mountains of rural China during the early 19th century. Many Chinese authorities do not accept the Buddhist origin, instead maintaining that those teachers were purely Taoist in origin, the evidence lying in baguazhang's frequent reference to core concepts central to Taoism, such as yin and yang theory, I Ching, and Taoism's most distinctive paradigm, the bagua diagram. The attribution to Buddhist teachers came from the second generation teachers, i.e. Dong Haichuan's students, some of whom were Buddhist. There is evidence to suggest a synthesis of several pre-existing martial arts taught and practised in the region in which Dong Haichuan lived, combined with Taoist circle walking that emulates the cyclical patterns found in nature. Through his work as a servant in the Imperial Palace he impressed the emperor with his graceful movements and fighting skill, and became an instructor and a bodyguard to the court. Dong Haichuan taught for many years in Beijing, eventually earning patronage by the Imperial court.

Famous disciples of Dong Haichuan to become teachers were Yin Fu, Cheng Tinghua, Ma Gui, Song Changrong (宋長榮), Liu Fengchun, Ma Weiqi (馬維棋), Liu Baozhen (劉寶珍), Liang Zhenpu, and Liu Dekuan (劉德寛). Although they were all students of the same teacher, their methods of training and expressions of palm techniques differed. The Cheng and Liu styles are said to specialize in "pushing" the palms, Yin style is known for "threading" the palms, Song's followers practice "Plum Flower" (梅花 Mei Hua) palm technique and Ma style palms are known as "hammers". Some of Dong Haichuan's students, including Cheng Tinghua, participated in the Boxer Rebellion. In general, most baguazhang exponents today practice either the Yin (尹), Cheng (程), Liang (梁) styles, although Fan (樊), Shi (史), Liu (劉), Fu (傅), and other styles also exist (the Liu-style is a special case, in that it is rarely practiced alone, but as a complement to other styles). In addition, there are sub-styles of the above methods as well, such as the Sun (孫), Gao (高), and Jiang (姜) styles, which are sub-styles of Cheng method.

== Modern styles ==
- Yin-style developed by Yin Fu
- Cheng-style developed by Cheng Tinghua
- Liang-style developed by Liang Zhenpu
- Gao-style developed by Gao Yisheng
- Yin Sect Gao-style developed by Gao Ziying
- Jiang Style developed by Jiang Rongqiao
- Shi-style developed by Shi Jidong (史計棟)
- Song-style developed by Song Changrong 宋長榮 and Song Yongxiang (宋永祥)
- Fan-style developed by Fan Zhiyong (范志勇)
- Liu-style developed by Liu Baozhen (劉寶珍)
- Ma-style developed by Ma Weiqi (馬維棋)
- Ma Gui-style developed by Ma Gui
- Gong Baotian-style developed by Gong Baotian (宮寶田)
- Sun-style developed by Sun Lutang
- Fu-style developed by Fu Zhensong
- Yin-yang-style baguazhang developed by Tian Hui (田廻)
- Ho Ho Choy-style baguazhang developed by He Kecai (何可才)
- Lu-style developed by Lu Shuitian (盧水田)

=== Common aspects ===
The practice of circle walking, or "turning the circle", as it is sometimes called, is baguazhang's characteristic method of stance and movement training. All forms of baguazhang utilize circle walking as an integral part of training. Practitioners walk around the edge of the circle in various low stances, facing the center, and periodically change direction as they execute forms. For a beginner, the circle is six to twelve feet in diameter. Students first learn flexibility and proper body alignment through the basic exercises, then move on to more complex forms and internal power mechanics. Although the internal aspects of baguazhang are similar to those of xingyiquan and tai chi, they are distinct in nature.

Many distinctive styles of weapons are contained within baguazhang; some use concealment, like the "judge's pen" (Chinese: 判官筆; pinyin: Pànguān Bǐ) or a pair of knives. The most elaborate knives, which are unique to the style, are wind and fire wheels (Chinese: 風火輪; pinyin: fēnghuǒlún) associated with the deity Nezha, and crescent-shaped deer horn knives (Chinese: 鹿角刀; pinyin: lùjiǎodāo) which have a similar aspect. Baguazhang is also known for practicing with extremely large weapons, another reference to Nezha, such as the bagua sword (八卦劍; bāguàjiàn) and the bagua broadsword (八卦刀; bāguàdāo). Other weapons are also used, such as the staff (gun), spear (qiang), cane (guai), and hook sword (gou). Baguazhang practitioners are known for being able to use anything as a weapon using the principles of their art.

Baguazhang contains an extremely wide variety of techniques as well as weapons, including various strikes (with palm, fist, elbow, fingers, etc.), kicks, joint locks, throws, and distinctively evasive circular footwork. As such, baguazhang is considered neither a purely striking nor a purely grappling martial art. Baguazhang emphasizes circular movement, allowing practitioners to flow, harmonize and evade objects and opponents. This is the source of the theory of being able to deal with multiple attackers and find solutions to seemingly complicated scenarios, within training or in daily life. Baguazhang's evasive nature is also shown by the practice of moving behind an attacker, so that the opponent cannot harm the practitioner.

Although the many branches of baguazhang are often quite different from each other (some, like Cheng-style, specialize in close-in wrestling and joint locks, while others, like some of the Yin styles, specialize in quick, long-range striking), all have circle walking, spiraling movement, and certain methods and techniques (piercing palms, crashing palms, etc.) in common.

Baguazhang's movements employ the whole body with smooth coiling and uncoiling actions, utilizing hand techniques, dynamic footwork, and throws. Rapid-fire movements draw energy from the center of the abdomen or dantian. The circular stepping pattern also builds up centripetal force, allowing the practitioner to maneuver quickly around an opponent.

== In media ==
- Baguazhang inspired the main basis of airbending in the 2005–2008 Nickelodeon Animation Studio TV series Avatar: The Last Airbender, M. Night Shyamalan's 2010 film counterpart, its 2024 Netflix counterpart, and its sequel series The Legend of Korra.
- Shang Chi and the Legend of the Ten Rings features baguazhang being used by Ying Li, mother of the title character and wife of Wenwu (the MCU's version of the Mandarin).
- Baguazhang is used by Zhang Ziyi as Gong Ruo Mei and Zhang Jin as Ma San in The Grandmaster.
- Jet Li uses baguazhang when playing Gabriel Yulaw in The One.
- Baguazhang inspired the Hyuga clan's gentle fist-fighting style in Naruto.
- Ling Xiaoyu of the Tekken series of games is said to practice Baguazhang and Piguazhang styles.
- Kitana uses a variation of baguazhang in Mortal Kombat: Deadly Alliance and Mortal Kombat: Armageddon. It was also used by Ashrah in Mortal Kombat: Deception.

== See also ==
- Bagua—the eight trigrams, used as guiding principles for baguazhang.
- I Ching—the Chinese Classic relied on by Taoist thinking.
- Feng shui—the metaphysical system of interior design based on the bagua.
- Tai chi—a similar neijia.
