= Cheng Tinghua =

Chinese martial artist

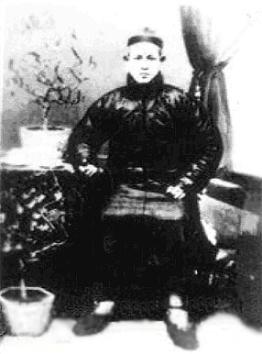
- Born: 1848; Shen County, China
- Died: 1900 (aged 51–52); Gun shot during the Battle of Peking (1900)
- Native name: 程廷華
- Other names: Cheng Yingfang
- Style: Shuaijiao, baguazhang
- Teacher: Dong Haichuan
- Rank: Founder of Cheng-style baguazhang

Other information
- Occupation: Martial artist

Cheng Tinghua (also known as Cheng Yingfang) (simplified Chinese: 程廷华; traditional Chinese: 程廷華; pinyin: Chéng Tínghuá) (1848–1900) was a teacher of Chinese neijia (baguazhang).

He was born in Shen County, (then in Hebei province, later in Shandong). He left his hometown and went to Beijing to apprentice with an eyeglass-maker. He was killed in 1900 during the Boxer Rebellion by German soldiers who shot him when he resisted their attempts to forcibly conscript him for a labor gang.

== Bibliography ==
- "The Pa Kua Chang Journal". 3 (6). September–October 1993.
