= Taoist meditation =

Meditative practice

- Chinese: 道家冥想
- Literal meaning: Tao school deep thinking
Transcriptions
Standard Mandarin
- Hanyu Pinyin: Dàojiā míngxiǎng
- Wade–Giles: Tao-chia ming-hsiang

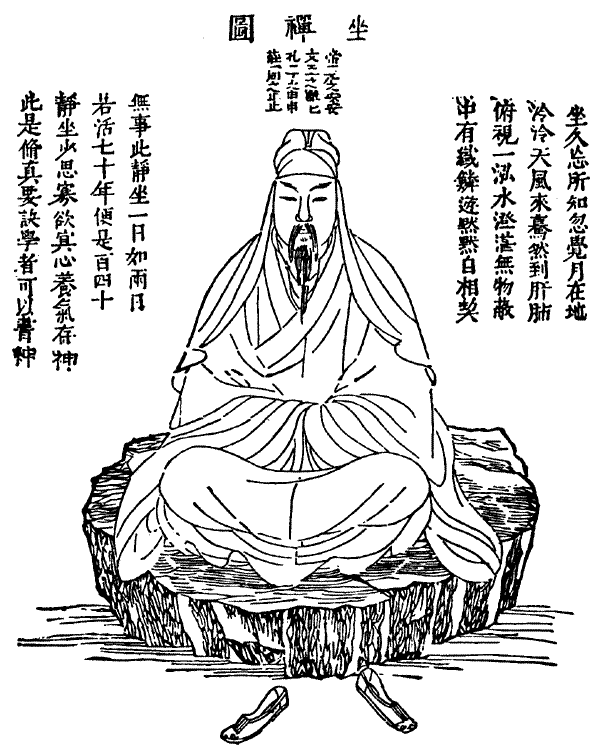
"Gathering the Light" from the Daoist neidan text The Secret of the Golden Flower

Taoist meditation (/ˈdaʊɪst/, /ˈtaʊ-/), also spelled Daoist (/ˈdaʊ-/), refers to the traditional meditative practices associated with the Chinese philosophy and religion of Taoism, including concentration, mindfulness, contemplation, and visualization. The earliest Chinese references to meditation date from the Warring States period (475–221 BCE).

Traditional Chinese medicine and Chinese martial arts have adapted certain Daoist meditative techniques. Some examples are Daoyin "guide and pull" breathing exercises, Neidan "internal alchemy" techniques, Neigong "internal skill" practices, Qigong breathing exercises, Zhan zhuang "standing like a post" techniques. The opposite direction of adoption has also taken place, when the martial art of Taijiquan, "great ultimate fist", became one of the practices of modern Daoist monks, while historically it was not among traditional techniques.

== Terminology ==
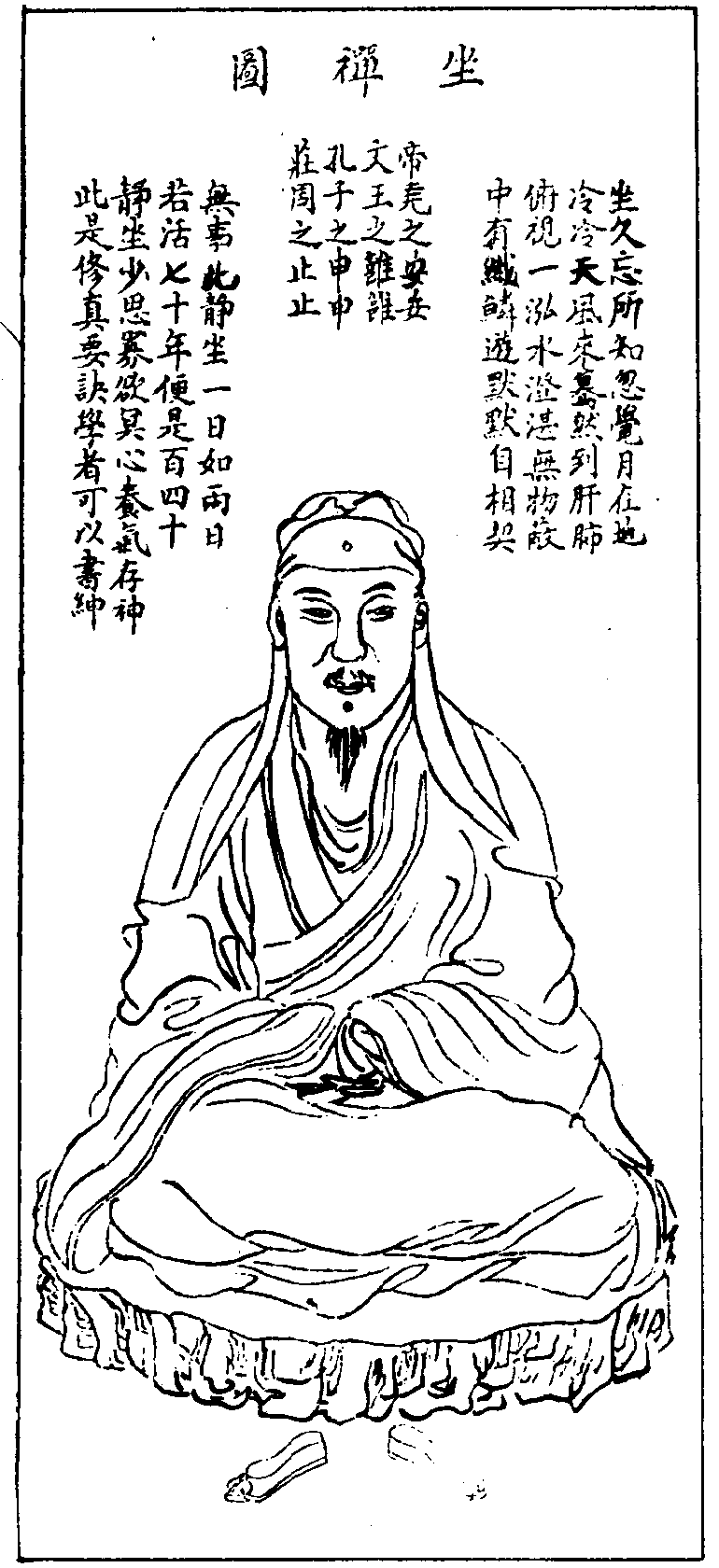
Sitting Meditation 坐禪圖, 1615 Xingming guizhi

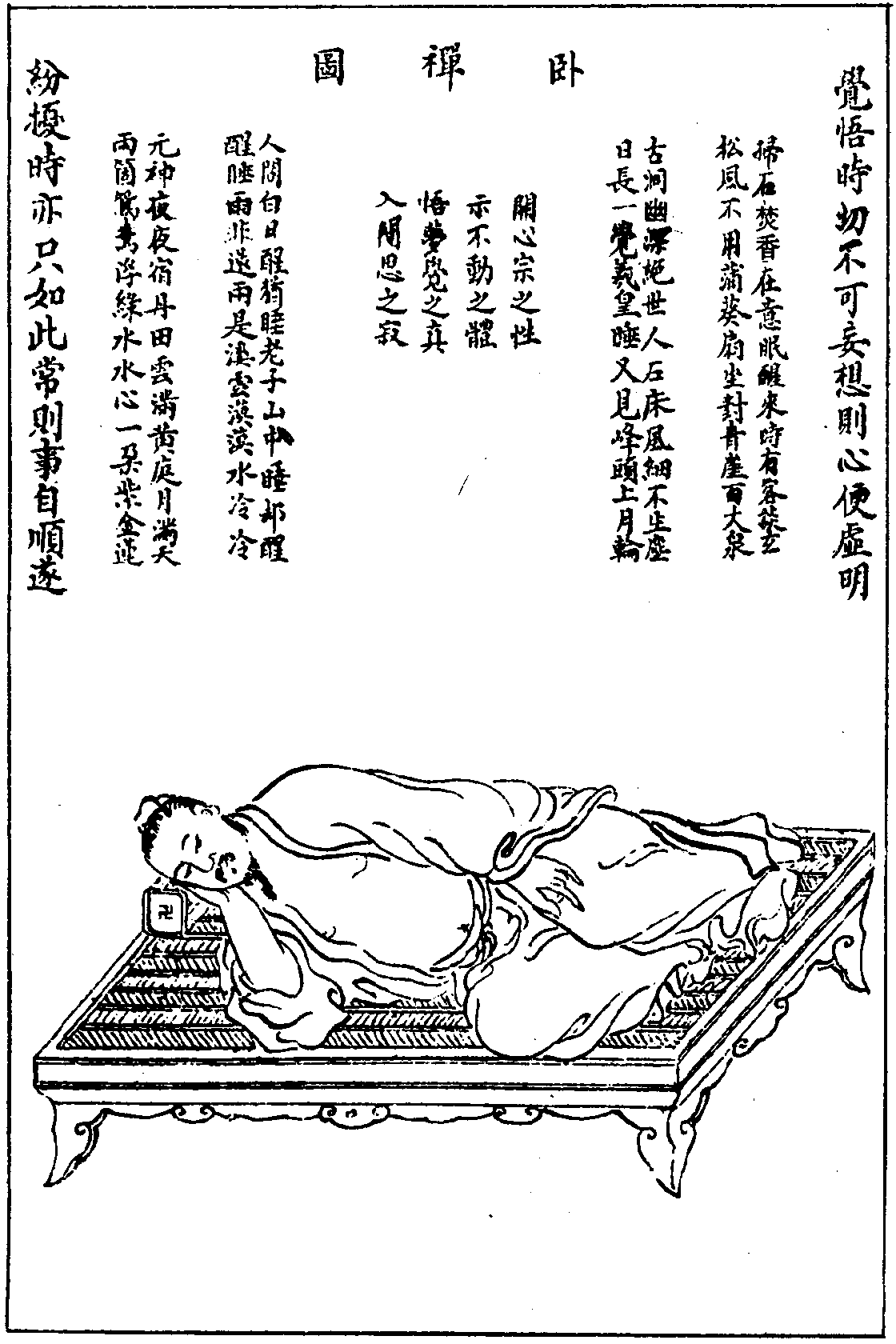
Lying Meditation 卧禪圖, 1615 Xingming guizhi

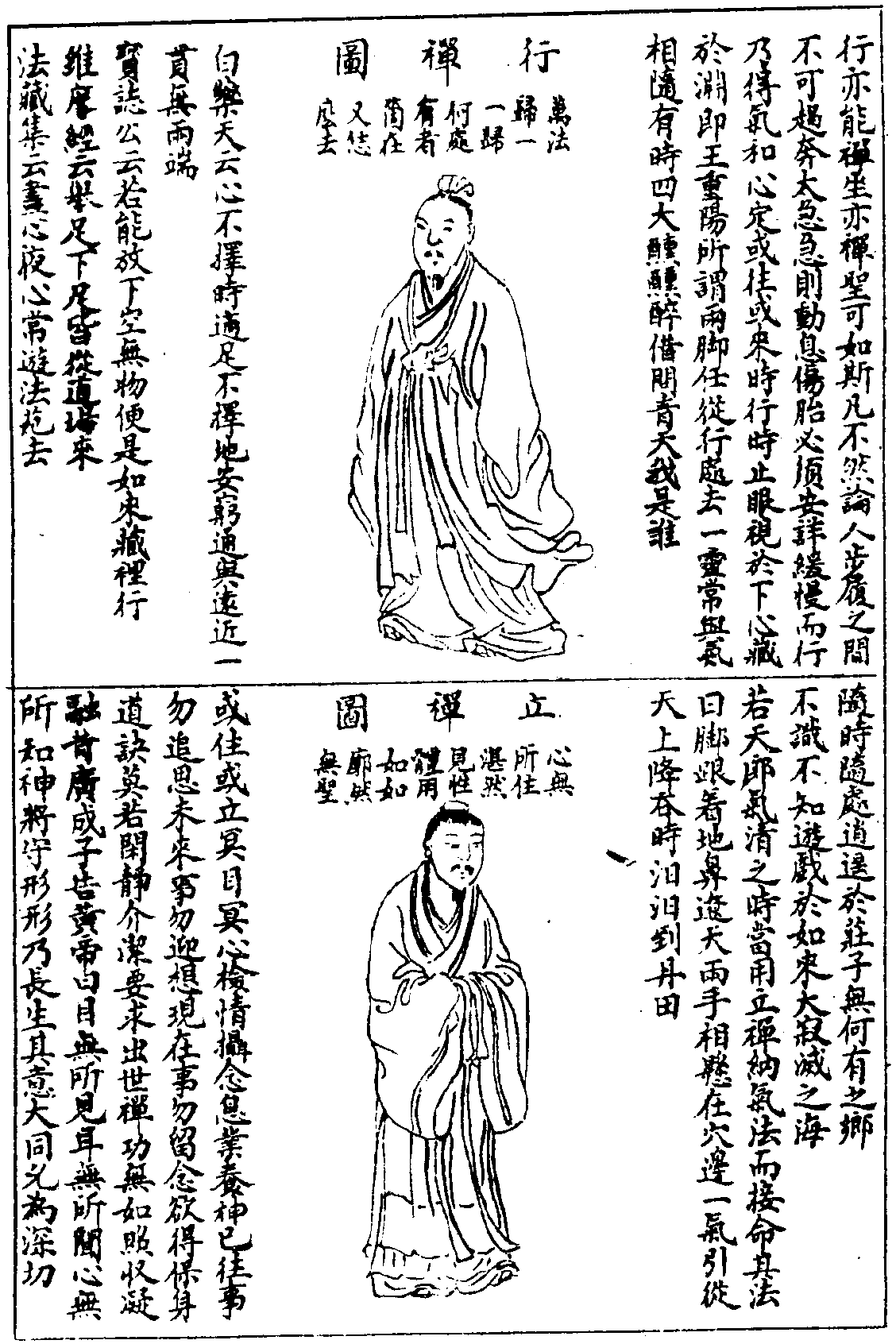
Walking and Standing Meditation 行禪圖, 立禪圖, 1615 Xingming guizhi

The Chinese language has several keywords for Daoist meditation practices, some of which are difficult to translate accurately into English.

=== Types of meditation ===
Livia Kohn distinguishes three basic types of Daoist meditation: "concentrative", "insight", and "visualization".

Ding 定 literally means "decide; settle; stabilize; definite; firm; solid" and early scholars such as Xuanzang used it to translate Sanskrit samadhi "deep meditative contemplation" in Chinese Buddhist texts. In this sense, Kohn renders ding as "intent contemplation" or "perfect absorption". The Zuowanglun has a section called Chinese: 泰定; pinyin: Taiding; trans. "intense concentration".

Guan 觀 basically means "look at (carefully); watch; observe; view; scrutinize" (and names the Yijing Hexagram 20 Guan "Viewing"). Guan became the Daoist technical term for "monastery; abbey", exemplified by Louguan 樓觀 "Tiered Abbey" temple, designating "Observation Tower", which was a major Daoist center from the 5th through 7th centuries (see Louguantai). Kohn says the word guan, "intimates the role of Daoist sacred sites as places of contact with celestial beings and observation of the stars". Tang dynasty (618–907) Daoist masters developed guan "observation" meditation from Tiantai Buddhist zhiguan (止觀) "cessation and insight" meditation, corresponding to śamatha-vipaśyanā – the two basic types of Buddhist meditation are samatha "calm abiding; stabilizing meditation" and vipassanā "clear observation; analysis". Kohn explains, "The two words indicate the two basic forms of Buddhist meditation: zhi is a concentrative exercise that achieves one-pointedness of mind or "cessation" of all thoughts and mental activities, while guan is a practice of open acceptance of sensory data, interpreted according to Buddhist doctrine as a form of "insight" or "wisdom". Guan meditators would seek to merge individual consciousness into emptiness and attain unity with the Dao.

Cun 存 usually means "exist; be present; live; survive; remain", but has a sense of "to cause to exist; to make present" in the Daoist meditation technique, which both the Shangqing School and Lingbao Schools popularized.

It thus means that the meditator, by an act of conscious concentration and focused intention, causes certain energies to be present in certain parts of the body or makes specific deities or scriptures appear before his or her mental eye. For this reason, the word is most commonly rendered "to visualize" or, as a noun, "visualization." Since, however, the basic meaning of cun is not just to see or be aware of but to be actually present, the translation "to actualize" or "actualization" may at times be correct if somewhat alien to the Western reader.

=== Other key words ===
Within the above three types of Daoist meditation, some important practices are:

- Zuowang (坐忘; "sitting forgetting") was first recorded in the (c. 3rd century BCE) Zhuangzi.
- Shouyi (守一; "guarding the one; maintaining oneness") involves ding "concentrative meditation" on a single point or god within the body, and is associated with Daoist alchemical and longevity techniques. The author, Dr. and Master Zhi Gang Sha says shouyi means meditational focus on the jindan (金丹) a "golden light ball" in his own words.
- Neiguan (內觀; "inner observation; inner vision") is visualizing inside one's body and mind, including zangfu organs, inner deities, qi movements, and thought processes.
- Yuanyou (遠遊; "far-off journey; ecstatic excursion"), best known as the Chuci poem title Yuan You, was meditative travel to distant countries, sacred mountains, the sun and moon, and encounters with gods and xian transcendents.
- Zuobo (坐缽; "sitting around the bowl (water clock)") was a Quanzhen School communal meditation that was linked to Buddhist zuochan (Japanese zazen) 坐禪 "sitting meditation"

== Warring States period ==
The earliest Chinese references to meditation date from the Warring States period (475–221 BCE), when the philosophical Hundred Schools of Thought flourished.

=== Guanzi and Neiye ===
Four chapters of the Guanzi have descriptions of meditation practices: Xinshu (心術; "Mind techniques") (chapters 36 and 37), Baixin (白心; "Purifying the mind") (38), and Neiye "Inward training" (49). Modern scholars believe the Neiye text was written in the 4th century BCE, and the others were derived from it. A. C. Graham regards the Neiye as "possibly the oldest 'mystical' text in China"; Harold Roth describes it as "a manual on the theory and practice of meditation that contains the earliest references to breath control and the earliest discussion of the physiological basis of self-cultivation in the Chinese tradition". Owing to the consensus that proto-Daoist Huang-Lao philosophers at the Jixia Academy in Qi composed the core Guanzi, Neiye meditation techniques are technically "Daoistic" rather than "Daoist".

Neiye Verse 8 associates dingxin (定心; "stabilizing the mind") with acute hearing and clear vision, and generating jing (精; "vital essence"). However, thought, says Roth, is considered "an impediment to attaining the well-ordered mind, particularly when it becomes excessive".

If you can be aligned and be tranquil,
Only then can you be stable.
With a stable mind at your core,
With the eyes and ears acute and clear,
And with the four limbs firm and fixed,
You can thereby make a lodging place for the vital essence.
The vital essence: it is the essence of the vital energy.
When the vital energy is guided, it [the vital essence] is generated,
But when it is generated, there is thought,
When there is thought, there is knowledge,
But when there is knowledge, then you must stop.
Whenever the forms of the mind have excessive knowledge,
You lose your vitality.

Neiye Verse 18 contains the earliest Chinese reference to practicing breath-control meditation. Breathing is said to "coil and uncoil" or "contract and expand"', "with coiling/contracting referring to exhalation and uncoiling/expanding to inhalation".

For all [to practice] this Way:
You must coil, you must contract,
You must uncoil, you must expand,
You must be firm, you must be regular [in this practice].
Hold fast to this excellent [practice]; do not let go of it.
Chase away the excessive; abandon the trivial.
And when you reach its ultimate limit
You will return to the Way and its inner power. (18)

Neiye Verse 24 summarizes "inner cultivation" meditation in terms of shouyi (守一; "maintaining the one") and yunqi (運氣; "revolving the qi"). Roth says this earliest extant shouyi reference "appears to be a meditative technique in which the adept concentrates on nothing but the Way, or some representation of it. It is to be undertaken when you are sitting in a calm and unmoving position, and it enables you to set aside the disturbances of perceptions, thoughts, emotions, and desires that normally fill your conscious mind."

When you enlarge your mind and let go of it,
When you relax your vital breath and expand it,
When your body is calm and unmoving:
And you can maintain the One and discard the myriad disturbances.
You will see profit and not be enticed by it,
You will see harm and not be frightened by it.
Relaxed and unwound, yet acutely sensitive,
In solitude you delight in your own person.
This is called "revolving the vital breath":
Your thoughts and deeds seem heavenly. (24)

=== Tao Te Ching ===
Several passages in the classic Tao Te Ching are interpreted as referring to meditation. For instance, "Attain utmost emptiness, Maintain utter stillness" (16) emphasizes xu (虛; "empty; void") and jing (靜; "still; quiet"), both of which are central meditative concepts. Randal P. Peerenboom describes Laozi's contemplative process as "apophatic meditation", the "emptying of all images (thoughts, feelings, and so on) rather than concentration on or filling the mind with images", comparable with Buddhist nirodha-samapatti "cessation of feelings and perceptions" meditation.

Verse 10 gives what Roth calls "probably the most important evidence for breathing meditation" in the Tao Te Ching.

While you
Cultivate the soul and embrace unity,
can you keep them from separating?
Focus your vital breath until it is supremely soft,
can you be like a baby?
Cleanse the mirror of mysteries,
can you make it free of blemish?
Love the people and enliven the state,
can you do so without cunning?
Open and close the gate of heaven,
can you play the part of the female?
Reach out with clarity in all directions,
can you refrain from action?
It gives birth to them and nurtures them,
It gives birth to them but does not possess them,
It rears them but does not control them.
This is called “mysterious integrity.”

Three of these Tao Te Ching phrases resonate with Neiye meditation vocabulary. Baoyi (抱一; "embrace unity") compares with shouyi (守一; "maintain the One") (24 above). Zhuanqi (專氣; "focus your vital breath") is zhuanqi (摶氣; "concentrating your vital breath") (19). Dichu xuanjian (滌除玄覽; "cleanse the mirror of mysteries") and jingchu qi she (敬除其舍; "diligently clean out its lodging place") (13) have the same verb chu "eliminate; remove".

The Taodejing exists in two received versions, named after the commentaries. The "Heshang Gong version" (see below) explains textual references to Daoist meditation, but the "Wang Bi version" explains them away. Wang Bi (226–249) was a scholar of Xuanxue "mysterious studies; neo-Daoism", which adapted Confucianism to explain Daoism, and his version eventually became the standard Tao Te Ching interpretation. Richard Wilhelm said Wang Bi's commentary changed the Tao Te Ching "from a compendiary of magical meditation to a collection of free philosophical aperçus".

=== Zhuangzi ===
The (c. 4th–3rd centuries BCE) Daoist Zhuangzi refers to meditation in more specific terms than the Tao Te Ching. Two well-known examples of mental disciplines are Confucius and his favorite disciple Yan Hui discussing xinzhai (心齋; "heart-mind fasting") and zuowang "sitting forgetting". In the first dialogue, Confucius explains xinzhai.

"I venture to ask what 'fasting of the mind' is," said Hui.
"Maintaining the unity of your will," said Confucius, "listen not with your ears but with your mind. Listen not with your mind but with your primal breath. The ears are limited to listening, the mind is limited to tallying. The primal breath, however, awaits things emptily. It is only through the Way that one can gather emptiness, and emptiness is the fasting of the mind." (4)

In the second, Yan Hui explains zuowang meditation.

Yen Hui saw Confucius again on another day and said, "I'm making progress."
"What do you mean?"
"I sit and forget."
"What do you mean, 'sit and forget'?" Confucius asked with surprise.
"I slough off my limbs and trunk," said Yen Hui, "dim my intelligence, depart from my form, leave knowledge behind, and become identical with the Transformational Thoroughfare. This is what I mean by 'sit and forget'."
"If you are identical," said Confucius, "then you have no preferences. If you are transformed, then you have no more constants. It's you who is really the worthy one! Please permit me to follow after you." (9)

Roth interprets this "slough off my limbs and trunk" (墮肢體) phrase to mean, "lose visceral awareness of the emotions and desires, which for the early Daoists, have 'physiological' bases in the various organs". Peerenboom further describes zuowang as "aphophatic or cessation meditation."

One does away with sense perceptions, with all forms of cognition (thoughts, knowledge, conceptions, idea, images), with all valuations (preferences, norms, mores). Cognate to and a variant of wang (忘—to forget) is wang (亡—to destroy, perish, disappear, not exist). In the apophatic meditative process, all distinctions and ways of distinguishing are "forgotten" in the sense of eliminated: they cease to exist.

Another Zhuangzi chapter describes breathing meditation that results in a body "like withered wood" and a mind "like dead ashes".

Sir Motley of Southurb sat leaning against his low table. He looked up to heaven and exhaled slowly. Disembodied, he seemed bereft of soul. Sir Wanderer of Countenance Complete, who stood in attendance before him, asked, "How can we explain this? Can the body really be made to become like withered wood? Can the mind really be made to become like dead ashes? The one who is leaning against the table now is not the one who was formerly leaning against the table." "Indeed," said Sir Motley, "your question is a good one, Yen. Just now, I lost myself. Can you understand this? You may have heard the pipes of man, but not the pipes of earth. You may have heard the pipes of earth, but not the pipes of heaven." (2)

Victor Mair presents Zhuangzi evidence for "close affinities between the Daoist sages and the ancient Indian holy men. Yogic breath control and asanas (postures) were common to both traditions." First, this reference to "breathing from the heels", which is a modern explanation of the sirsasana "supported headstand".

The true man [i.e., zhenren] of old did not dream when he slept and did not worry when he was awake. His food was not savory, his breathing was deep. The breathing of the true man is from his heels, the breathing of the common man is from his throat. The words of those who unwillingly yield catch in their throats as though they were retching. Those whose desires are deep-seated will have shallow natural reserves. (6)

Second, this "bear strides and bird stretches" reference to xian practices of yogic postures and breath exercises.

Retiring to bogs and marshes, dwelling in the vacant wilderness, fishing and living leisurely—all this is merely indicative of nonaction. But it is favored by the scholars of rivers and lakes, men who flee from the world and wish to be idle. Blowing and breathing, exhaling and inhaling, expelling the old and taking in the new, bear strides and bird stretches—all this is merely indicative of the desire for longevity. But it is favored by scholars who channel the vital breath and flex the muscles and joints, men who nourish the physical form so as to emulate the hoary age of Progenitor P'eng [i.e., Peng Zu]. (15)

Mair previously noted the (c. 168 BCE) Mawangdui Silk Texts, famous for two Tao Te Ching manuscripts, include a painted text that illustrates gymnastic exercises–including the "odd expression 'bear strides'".

=== Xingqi jade inscription ===
Some writing on a Warring States era jade artifact could be an earlier record of breath meditation than the Neiye, Tao Te Ching, or Zhuangzi. This rhymed inscription entitled xingqi 行氣 "circulating qi" was inscribed on a dodecagonal block of jade, tentatively identified as a pendant or a knob for a staff. While the dating is uncertain, estimates range from approximately 380 BCE (Guo Moruo) to earlier than 400 BCE (Joseph Needham). In any case, Roth says, "both agree that this is the earliest extant evidence for the practice of guided breathing in China".

The inscription says:

To circulate the Vital Breath:
Breathe deeply, then it will collect.
When it is collected, it will expand.
When it expands, it will descend.
When it descends, it will become stable.
When it is stable, it will be regular.
When it is regular, it will sprout.
When it sprouts, it will grow.
When it grows, it will recede.
When it recedes, it will become heavenly.
The dynamism of Heaven is revealed in the ascending;
The dynamism of Earth is revealed in the descending.
Follow this and you will live; oppose it and you will die.

Practicing this series of exhalation and inhalation patterns, one becomes directly aware of the "dynamisms of Heaven and Earth" through ascending and descending the breath through the Chong Mai Meridian, directly affecting the Nao network (Brain and spinal cord) Tianji 天機, translated "dynamism of Heaven", also occurs in the Zhuangzi (6), as "natural reserves" in "Those whose desires are deep-seated will have shallow natural reserves".Roth notes the final line's contrasting verbs, xun 訓 "follow; accord with" and ni 逆 "oppose; resist", were similarly used in the (168 BCE) Huangdi Sijing Yin-yang silk manuscripts.

== Han dynasty ==
As Daoism was flourishing during the Han dynasty (206 BCE–220 CE), meditation practitioners continued early techniques and developed new ones.

=== Huainanzi ===
The (139 BCE) Huainanzi, which is an eclectic compilation attributed to Liu An, frequently describes meditation, especially as a means for rulers to achieve effective government.

Internal evidence reveals that the Huainanzi authors were familiar with the Guanzi methods of meditation. The text uses xinshu 心術 "mind techniques" both as a general term for "inner cultivation" meditation practices and as a specific name for the Guanzi chapters.

The essentials of the world: do not lie in the Other but instead lie in the self; do not lie in other people but instead lie in your own person. When you fully realize it [the Way] in your own person, then all the myriad things will be arrayed before you. When you thoroughly penetrate the teachings of the Techniques of the Mind, then you will be able to put lusts and desires, likes and dislikes, outside yourself.

Several Huainanzi passages associate breath control meditation with longevity and immortality. For example, two famous xian "immortals":

Now Wang Qiao and Chi Songzi exhaled and inhaled, spitting out the old and internalizing the new. They cast off form and abandoned wisdom; they embraced simplicity and returned to genuineness; in roaming with the mysterious and subtle above, they penetrated to the clouds and Heaven. Now if one wants to study their Way and does not attain their nurturing of the qi and their lodging of the spirit but only imitates their every exhale and inhale, their contracting and expanding, it is clear that one will not be able to mount the clouds and ascend on the vapors.

=== Heshang gong commentary ===
The (c. 2nd century CE) Tao Te Ching commentary attributed to Heshang Gong 河上公 (lit. "Riverbank Elder") provides what Kohn calls the "first evidence for Daoist meditation" and "proposes a concentrative focus on the breath for harmonization with the Dao".

Eduard Erkes says the purpose of the Heshang Gong commentary was not only to explicate the Tao Te Ching, but chiefly to enable "the reader to make practical use of the book and in teaching him to use it as a guide to meditation and to a life becoming a Daoist skilled in meditative training".

Two examples from Tao Te Ching 10 (see above) are the Daoist meditation terms xuanlan 玄覽 (lit. "dark/mysterious display") "observe with a tranquil mind" and tianmen 天門 (lit. "gate of heaven") "middle of the forehead". Xuanlan occurs in the line 滌除玄覽 that Mair renders "Cleanse the mirror of mysteries". Erkes translates "By purifying and cleansing one gets the dark look", because the commentary says, "One must purify one's mind and let it become clear. If the mind stays in dark places, the look knows all its doings. Therefore it is called the dark look." Erkes explains xuanlan as "the Daoist term for the position of the eyes during meditation, when they are half-closed and fixed on the point of the nose." Tianmen occurs in the line 天門開闔 "Open and close the gate of heaven". The Heshang commentary says, "The gate of heaven is called the purple secret palace of the north-pole. To open and shut means to end and to begin with the five junctures. In the practice of asceticism, the gate of heaven means the nostrils. To open means to breathe hard; to shut means to inhale and exhale."

=== Taiping jing ===
The (c. 1st century BCE to 2nd century CE) Taiping Jing "Scripture of Great Peace" emphasized shouyi "guarding the One" meditation, in which one visualizes different cosmic colors corresponding with different parts of one's body.

In a state of complete concentration, when the light first arises, make sure to hold on to it and never let it go. First of all, it will be red, after a long time it will change to be white, later again it will be green, and then it will pervade all of you completely. When you further persist in guarding the One, there will be nothing within that would not be brilliantly illuminated, and the hundred diseases will be driven out.

Besides "guarding the One" where a meditator is assisted by the god of Heaven, the Taiping jing also mentions "guarding the Two" with help from the god of Earth, "guarding the Three" with help from spirits of the dead, and "guarding the Four" or "Five" in which one is helped by the myriad beings.

The Taiping jing shengjun bizhi 太平經聖君祕旨 "Secret Directions of the Holy Lord on the Scripture of Great Peace" is a Tang-period collection of Taiping jing fragments concerning meditation. It provides some detailed information, for instance, interpretations of the colors visualized.

In guarding the light of the One, you may see a light as bright the rising sun. This is a brilliance as strong as that of the sun at noon. In guarding the light of the One, you may see a light entirely green. When this green is pure, it is the light of lesser yang. In guarding the light of the One, you may see a light entirely red, just like fire. This is a sign of transcendence. In guarding the light of the One, you may see a light entirely yellow. When this develops a greenish tinge, it is the light of central harmony. This is a potent remedy of the Tao. In guarding the light of the One, you may see a light entirely white. When this is as clear as flowing water, it is the light of lesser yin. In guarding the light of the One, you may see a light entirely black. When this shimmers like deep water, it is the light of greater yin.

In the year 142, Zhang Daoling founded the Tianshi "Celestial Masters" movement, which was the first organized form of Taoist religion. Zhang and his followers practiced Taiping jing meditation and visualization techniques. After the Way of the Five Pecks of Rice rebellion against the Han dynasty, Zhang established a theocratic state in 215, which led to the downfall of the Han.

== Six Dynasties ==
The historical term "Six Dynasties" collectively refers to the Three Kingdoms (220–280 CE), Jin dynasty (266–420), and Southern and Northern Dynasties (420–589). During this period of disunity after the fall of the Han, Chinese Buddhism became popular and new schools of religious Daoism emerged.

=== Early visualization meditation ===
Daoism's "first formal visualization texts appear" in the 3rd century.

The Huangting jing 黃庭經 "Scripture of the Yellow Court" is probably the earliest text describing inner gods and spirits located in the human body. Meditative practices described in the Huangting jing include visualization of bodily organs and their gods, visualization of the sun and moon, and absorption of neijing 內景 "inner light".

The Laozi zhongjing 老子中經 "Central Scripture of Laozi" similarly describes visualizing and activating gods within the body, along with breathing exercises for meditation and longevity techniques. The adept envisions the yellow and red essences of the sun and moon, which activates Laozi and Yunü 玉女 "Jade Woman" within the abdomen, producing the shengtai 聖胎 "sacred embryo".

The Cantong qi "Kinship of the Three", attributed to Wei Boyang (fl. 2nd century), criticizes Daoist methods of meditation on inner deities.

=== Baopuzi ===
The Jin dynasty scholar Ge Hong's (c. 320) Baopuzi "Master who Embraces Simplicity", which is an invaluable source for early Daoism, describes shouyi "guarding the One" meditation as a source for magical powers from the zhenyi 真一 "True One".

Realizing the True One, the original unity and primordial oneness of all, meant placing oneself at the center of the universe, identifying one's physical organs with constellations in the stars. The practice led to control over all the forces of nature and beyond, especially over demons and evil forces.

Ge Hong says his teacher Zheng Yin 鄭隱 taught that:

If a man can preserve Unity, Unity will also preserve him. In this way the bare blade finds no place in his body to inserts its edge; harmful things find no place in him that will admit entrance to their evil. Therefore, in defeat it is possible to be victorious; in positions of peril, to feel only security. Whether in the shrine of a ghost, in the mountains or forests, in a place suffering the plague, within a tomb, in bush inhabited by tigers and wolves, or in the habitation of snakes, all evils will go far away as long as one remains diligent in the preservation of Unity. (18)

The Baopuzi also compares shouyi meditation with a complex mingjing 明鏡 "bright mirror" multilocation visualization process through which an individual can mystically appear in several places at once.

My teacher used to say that to preserve Unity was to practice jointly Bright Mirror, and that on becoming successful in the mirror procedure a man would be able to multiply his body to several dozen all with the same dress and facial expression. (18)

=== Shangqing meditation ===
The Daoist school of Shangqing "Highest Clarity" traces its origins to Wei Huacun (252–334), who was a Tianshi adept proficient in meditation techniques. Shangqing adopted the Huangting jing as scripture, and the hagiography of Wei Huacun claims a xian "immortal" transmitted it (and thirty other texts) to her in 288. Additional divine texts were supposedly transmitted to Yang Xi from 364 to 370, constituting the Shangqing scriptures.

The practices they describe include not only concentration on the bajing 八景 (Eight Effulgences) and visualization of gods in the body, but also active interaction with the gods, ecstatic excursions to the stars and the heavens of the immortals (yuanyou 遠遊), and the activation of inner energies in a protoform of inner alchemy (neidan). The world of meditation in this tradition is incomparably rich and colorful, with gods, immortals, body energies, and cosmic sprouts vying for the adept's attention.

=== Lingbao meditation ===
Beginning around 400 CE, the Lingbao "Numinous Treasure" School eclectically adopted concepts and practices from Daoism and Buddhism, which had recently been introduced to China. Ge Chaofu, Ge Hong's grandnephew, "released to the world" the Wufu jing 五符經 "Talismans of the Numinous Treasure" and other Lingbao scriptures, and claimed family transmission down from Ge Xuan (164–244), Ge Hong's great uncle.

The Lingbao School added the Buddhist concept of reincarnation to the Daoist tradition of xian "immortality; longevity", and viewed meditation as a means to unify body and spirit.

Many Lingbao meditation methods came from native Chinese traditions, such as visualizing inner gods (Taiping jing), and circulating the solar and lunar essences (Huangting jing and Laozi zhongjing). Meditation rituals changed from individuals practicing privately to Lingbao clergy worshipping communally; frequently with the "multidimensional quality" of a priest performing interior visualizations while leading congregants in communal visualization rites.

=== Buddhist influences ===
During the Southern and Northern Dynasties period, the introduction of traditional Buddhist meditation methods richly influenced Daoist meditation.

The (c. late 5th-century) The Northern Celestial Masters text Xishengjing "Scripture of Western Ascension" recommends cultivating an empty state of consciousness called wuxin 無心 (lit. "no mind") "cease all mental activity" (translating Sanskrit acitta from citta चित्त "mind"), and advocates a simple form of guan 觀 "observation" insight meditation (translating vipassanā from vidyā विद्या "knowledge").

Two early Chinese encyclopedias, the (c. 570) Daoist encyclopedia Wushang biyao 無上秘要 "Supreme Secret Essentials" and the (7th century) Buddhistic Daojiao yishu 道教義樞 "Pivotal Meaning of Daoist Teachings" distinguish various levels of guan 觀 "observation" insight meditation, under the influence of the Buddhist Madhyamaka school's Two truths doctrine. The Daojiao yishu, for instance, says.

Realize also that in concentration and insight, one does not reach enlightenment and perfection of body and mind through the two major kinds of observation [of energy and spirit] alone. Rather, there are five different sets of three levels of observation. One such set of three is: 1. Observation of apparent existence. 2. Observation of real existence. 3. Observation of partial emptiness.

== Tang dynasty ==
Daoism was in competition with Confucianism and Buddhism during the Tang dynasty (618–907), and Daoists integrated new meditation theories and techniques from Buddhists.

The 8th century was a "heyday" of Daoist meditation; recorded in works such as Sun Simiao's Cunshen lianqi ming 存神煉氣銘 "Inscription on Visualization of Spirit and Refinement of Energy", Sima Chengzhen 司馬承禎's Zuowanglun "Essay on Sitting in Forgetfulness", and Wu Yun 吳筠's Shenxian kexue lun 神仙可學論 "Essay on How One May Become a Divine Immortal through Training". These Daoist classics reflect a variety of meditation practices, including concentration exercises, visualizations of body energies and celestial deities to a state of total absorption in the Dao, and contemplations of the world.

The (9th century) Qingjing Jing "Scripture of Clarity and Quiescence" associates the Tianshi tradition of a divinized Laozi with Daoist guan and Buddhist vipaśyanā methods of insight meditation.

== Song dynasty ==
Under the Song dynasty (960–1279), the Daoist schools of Quanzhen "Complete Authenticity" and Zhengyi "Orthodox Unity" emerged, and Neo-Confucianism became prominent.

Along with the continued integration of meditation methods, two new visualization and concentration practices became popular. Neidan "inner alchemy" involved the circulation and refinement of inner energies in a rhythm based on the Yijing. Meditation focused upon starry deities (e.g., the Santai 三台 "Three Steps" stars in Ursa Major) and warrior protectors (e.g., the Xuanwu 玄武 "Dark Warrior; Black Tortoise" Northern Sky spirit).

== Later dynasties ==
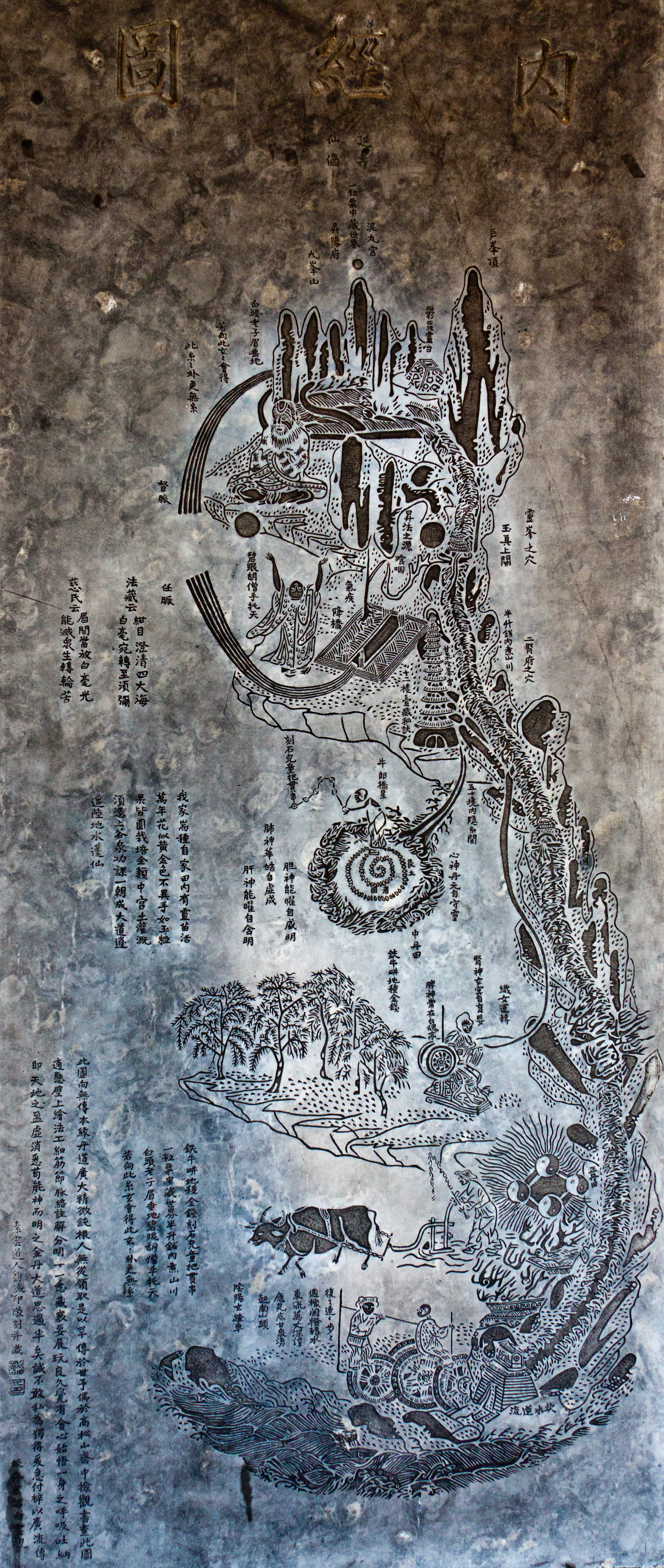
The Neijing Tu (simplified Chinese: 內经图; traditional Chinese: 內經圖; pinyin: Nèijīng tú; Wade–Giles: Nei-ching t'u) is a Daoist "inner landscape" diagram of the human body illustrating Neidan "Internal alchemy", Wu Xing, Yin and Yang, and Chinese mythology.

During the Yuan dynasty (1279–1367), Daoists continued to develop the Song period practices of neidan alchemy and deity visualizations.

Under the Ming dynasty (1368–1644), neidan methods were interchanged between Daoism and Chan Buddhism. Many literati in the scholar-official class practiced Daoist and Buddhist meditations, which exerted a stronger influence on Confucianism.

In the Qing dynasty (1644–1912), Daoists wrote the first specialized texts on nüdan 女丹 "inner alchemy for women", and developed new forms of physical meditation, notably Taijiquan—sometimes described as meditation in motion or moving meditation. This Neijia internal martial art is named after the Taijitu symbol, which was a traditional focus in both Daoist and Neo-Confucian meditation.

== Modern period ==
Daoism and other Chinese religions were suppressed under the Republic of China (1912–1949) and in the People's Republic of China from 1949 to 1979. Many Daoist temples and monasteries have been reopened in recent years.

Western knowledge of Daoist meditation was stimulated by Richard Wilhelm's (German 1929, English 1962) The Secret of the Golden Flower translation of the (17th century) neidan text Taiyi jinhua zongzhi 太乙金華宗旨.

In the 20th century, the Qigong movement has incorporated and popularized Daoist meditation, and "mainly employs concentrative exercises but also favors the circulation of energy in an inner-alchemical mode". Teachers have created new methods of meditation, such as Wang Xiangzhai's zhan zhuang "standing like a post" in the Yiquan school.

== Influence on Psychology ==
Taoist meditation techniques have had influences on western psychology, particularly in the field of transpersonal psychology. The things that they studied in Taoist practices including the witnessing awareness and self cultivation have parallels to the western world. The psychologist Carl Jung explored Taoist philosophy through texts like The Secret of the Golden Flower where he connected the Taoist philosophy of turning inwards to his ideas of individuation.
