= Wang Shujin =

Chinese martial art practitioner

- Born: 1904; China
- Died: 1981 (aged 76–77); Taipei
- Native name: 王樹金
- Other names: Wang Heng Sun
- Style: Cheng-style baguazhang Yang-style tai chi Xingyiquan
- Teachers: Zhang Zhaodong; Chen Panling (陳泮嶺); Wang Xiangzhai

Wang Shujin (王樹金, 1904–1981), also known as Wang Heng Sun, was a Chinese martial artist, practitioner of the disciplines of baguazhang, taijiquan, and xingyiquan. He was one of their greatest promoters outside China, being their first teacher in Taiwan and Japan, and was particularly known for his challenges to other martial artists. Aside from his martial exploits, Wang was also a spiritual leader in the Taoist sect Yiguandao.

== Biography ==
=== Early life ===
While working as a carpenter in Tianjin, Shujin started training at 18 years old under renowned master Zhang Zhaodong or Chang Chao Tung, who he served until the latter's death in 1940. He also trained xinyiquan and zhan zhuang qigong under Wang Xiangzhai, disciple of Guo Yunshen. He became an adept of the Yiguandao sect and moved to Taiwan in 1948, after which he befriended and trained under Chen Panling (陳泮嶺), an apprentice to Yang Shaohou and Wu Jianquan. From the next decades until the 70s, Wang frequently traveled to Japan, where he taught Chinese martial arts.

He was known for being an innovator and the first teacher to teach the tai chi, xingyiquan, and baguazhang in the country of Japan, establishing schools there and in Taiwan. He would initiate eight known disciples during his lifetime: Chao Piaosheng, Huang Jinsheng, Jibiki Hidemine, Lai Tianzhao, Rottmann Manfred, Wang Fulai, Zhang Yizhung and Wells Marnix.

=== Challenges ===
A man of almost 300 pounds, he was considered one of the greatest Chinese fighters, and it was said that his control of zhan zhuang and his immense strength and toughness enabled him to absorb the impact of strikes which would knock out a common person. Like Shang Yunxiang, he was also specialized in a variation of xinyiquan's most powerful punching technique, bengquan, where he would push his opponent with his large belly. Wang famously hated karate, claiming it was a martial art valid only "to fight children and old women." He supposedly fought many karateka while in Japan, with none of them being ever able to hurt him.

In an anecdote on December 14, 1954, Wang met boxing champion Joe Louis while he was touring Taipei. Shujin challenged him to punch him in the stomach with all his power, claiming he would absorb the blow, but Louis refused on the saying he didn't want to kill Wang by accident.

==== Contact with Donn Draeger ====
During the 1960s, Shujin taught in Japan such Western martial artists Donn Draeger, Phil Relnick, Robert W. Smith and Jon Bluming, living near the Kodokan Institute. Smith, who also received instruction from Wang in Taiwan, wrote that Wang "could do something beyond the ability of all the fighters I saw." The Chinese master could especially tolerate any kick to the lower body, excluding the groin. Upon request, Smith repeatedly kicked his ankle, calf and knee without any effect. Draeger, a judo 4th dan black belt, trained baguazhang for several years, and spoke admiringly of his time with Wang: "He came to my house and picked up a meteorite the size of a shotput that I used as a paperweight. He took a one legged stance and held it, palm down with one hand for ten minutes. Then he shifted hand-and-leg and did it ten minutes on the other side. He said to me: 'The trouble with you is you have no control over your body.'"

Nonetheless, Draeger was unsure of Wang's real skill as a fighter, so he put Bluming, who had training at both judo and karate, to test the Chinese master. Bluming punched him in the belly, without any effect, and later tried to throw Wang without the help of a gi, being instead thrown "meters away". Wang was also apparently asked to demonstrate a one-inch hand strike to the solar plexus, which made Bluming collapse in pain. However, Wang refused to spar with them, and Draeger and Bluming remained skeptical of Shujin's fighting skill, arguing that the ability to perform certain physical stunts did not necessarily mean to be a proficient alive fighter.

Another version of the previous, told by Frank Allen, has Wang actually injuring Bluming's wrist bones during the test, as well as Draeger fighting Wang personally in a sparring match. The judoka would have been defeated by the Chinese with a single one-inch palm strike to the gut, and only after this defeat Draeger would have started learning under Wang. This version is doubtful, given that Draeger was famously skeptical of the effectivity of Chinese martial arts until his death, even after his own extraordinary experiences with Shujin, and apparently never managed to get Wang to spar with him. Bluming also denied having been injured, having only superficially hurt his wrist at the punch.

==== Contact with aikidoka ====
During the early 60s, aikido student Terry Dobson started to train Chinese martial arts with Wang, impressed by his skill and strength. He was criticized by other aikidoka for doing so, to which he replied: "I could care less about being O-Sensei's student. I want to be O-Sensei." The opinion of the aikido community towards Wang seemed to come from earlier, as Draeger had tried repeatedly to arrange for aikido practitioner Koichi Tohei to face Wang, but Tohei never conceded.

Around the same time, however, Wang would fight a notorious challenge against an aikidoka, Kazuo Chiba, who had witnessed Wang being punched in the belly by several karateka without effects. By mediation of two common students, Chiba went to Wang's dojo in order to prove him further, and they hosted an impromptu sparring match.

According to Chiba, the aikidoka avoided a charge by performing tai sabaki, and then injured Wang's wrist through kote gaeshi. At that moment, and despite the injury, the Chinese retaliated by pushing Chiba across the room with his hands, making the students interrupt the match. However, the anecdote goes differently according to fellow witnesses Dobson, Draeger and Mitsugi Saotome, interviewed separately. Chiba punched Wang several times to no effect, and on the third attempt, Wang struck back with his belly, nearly dislocating Chiba's arm. Wang then offered Chiba his hand and wrist, which the latter tried to break using various aikido techniques. Wang suddenly countered, dropping Chiba to the ground and making him shout in pain. Wang stated, "You have a little chi. Come back when you have more."

==== Other challenges ====
In 1968 Bruce Frantzis, then a 19-year-old junior karate champion, trained with Wang in Taiwan. According to him, he was routinely dominated by Wang with baguazhang techniques every time they sparred. The Chinese master also allowed him to kick him full force in all his body, including his groin, without receiving damage. Frantzis heard Wang had broken opponents' spines by pulling them against his belly pushes, though he was later taught it was possible to avoid this technique by turning sideways and receiving the blow with the hip. He further claimed Wang was undefeated in no-holds-barred challenges in Japan, that he had beaten down young challengers while in his eighties, and that he had produced equally strong students of many ages.

Frantzis also recounted Wang taught Taoist meditation and sexual practices to select students, and could himself increase the heat of his hands using qi control, a skill also witnessed by Phil Relnick. Frantzis also claimed Wang could project his qi or fa jin to strike him powerfully without even touching him.

According to Ellis Amdur, a terminally ill and seventy years old Wang once defeated a Kyokushin karate champion by stepping inside his attack, hugging him and throwing him down with his signature belly push.

== Personal life ==
Wang was a vegetarian, remained celibate and was unmarried. It was reported that he owned several rice stores.

He died in 1981 in Taiwan due to a melanoma complicated by his diabetes.
