= Guo Yunshen =

Guo Yunshen 郭雲深
- Born: 1829; China
- Died: 1898 (aged 68–69); China
- Other names: "One fist beating all"
- Style: Neijia; Xingyiquan
- Teacher(s): Li Luoneng

Other information
- Notable students: Sun Lutang (founder of Sun-style tai chi); Wang Xiangzhai (founder of Yiquan)

Guo Yunshen (simplified Chinese: 郭云深; traditional Chinese: 郭雲深; pinyin: Guō Yúnshēn) (1829 - 1898) was a famous xingyiquan master. He represented the xingyiquan martial philosophy of preferring to become highly proficient with only a few techniques rather than to be less proficient with many techniques. His skill with one technique Beng Quan was legendary: it was said of him that "with his 'half-step bengquan', he could fight anyone under heaven without finding an equal." (banbu bengquan da yu tianxia wu dishou), and earned the nickname "the steadfast one" (bu daota).

Although it is not historically reliable, he is said to have fought Dong Haichuan, the founder of baguazhang, whereby neither was able to defeat the other. The outcome of their purported match was that practitioners of both arts each highly respected the others. In another version of this story, Guo Yunshen, desiring to fight Dong Haichuan, he first went to visit Cheng Tinghua, another native of Hebei province. Cheng invited Guo to dinner. Guo demonstrated his "Divine Crushing Fist", which Cheng evaded twice. Because of this, he rethought his plan to challenge Dong, knowing him to be a superior practitioner to Cheng.

His teaching was based on the "three truths" (san li), the "three capacities" (san gong), the "three methods" (san fa) and the single/double weight notion (danzhong/shuangzhong) during santishi standing practice. His students should stand still for at least three years before they could learn the forms.

Guo Yunshen had learned with Li Luoneng and was also a member of the Hebei xingyiquan school. He taught famous students like Qian Yantang, Xu Zhanao, Li Kui Yuan and his disciple Sun Lutang. Wang Xiangzhai, founder of dachengquan was his last closed door disciple. Wang Xiangzhai was Guo Yunshen's nephew. Wang was taught Guo's traditional xingyiquan. It is stated that Master Guo would instruct young Wang to hold the San Ti posture, without explanation, until a puddle of perspiration formed at his feet. This latter has been publicly revealed "zhan zhuang" by Wang Xiangzhai, a term commonly in use throughout the martial community today.
