= Ji Jike =

Ji Jike 姬際可
- Born: 1588; Yongji, Shanxi, China
- Died: 1662 (aged 73–74); China
- Other names: Ji Longfeng (姬龍峰), "God of the Lance"
- Style: Shaolin Kung Fu
- Rank: Founder of Xinyiquan

Other information
- Notable students: Cao Jiwu; Ma Xueli

Ji Jike (Chinese: 姬際可; 1588–1662) was a highly accomplished martial artist from Yongji, Shanxi Province. He was also known as Ji Longfeng (Chinese: 姬龍峰). According to accepted theory, he is widely considered to be the originator of the internal martial art of Xingyiquan. (Other, less credible, theories consider Bodhidharma or Yue Fei as the originators of this art.) Ji Jike created the martial art of Xinyiquan (Heart and Intention Boxing), which is the precursor of Xingyiquan (Form and Intention Boxing). He based the fundamentals of Xinyi on the spear techniques for which he was also famous. It was Li Luo Neng, a most famous descendant of Ji Jike, who modified Xinyi and called it Xingyi.

== Biography ==
During Ji Jike's lifetime, China was taken over by the Manchu Qing dynasty (1644–1912), descendants of the Jurchen tribes of Yue Fei's time. Ji Jike began his classical studies when he was seven years old, and Wushu training at 13. After sitting for the imperial examination, he passed with honors, which earned him a position as a court official in Shanxi. However, he was disillusioned in this position because of the corruption he encountered, and was eventually forced out of office.

After leaving, he traveled throughout China to refine his martial art. He eventually made his way to the Shaolin temple in Henan province to study Shaolin Wushu. At the temple, the monks were all amazed at his skill with the spear as well as his unarmed fighting skills. Welcomed by the monks, he stayed at the Temple, where he spent more than 10 years. It was here where he created Xinyi. Legend has it that during his time at the Temple, Ji once observed two cocks fighting, and was inspired to complete his development of the art of Xinyi. He taught his art to the monks, who passed it on as Xinyi Ba (心意把). It was also during this time that he was suspected of being involved with the resistance opposing the Qing dynasty.

Later, after leaving the temple, he taught in the region to others from Henan. The most prominent of his students was Cao Jiwu and the other, Ma Xueli.

When Ji returned home to Shanxi, he taught Xinyi to family members. He was nicknamed "Divine Spear" (神枪) for his exemplary skill, and was respected like a guardian deity, for he single-handedly defeated a band of bandits raiding his village when he was of old age.
