= Yao Zongxun =

姚宗勛 Yao Zongxun
- Born: 1917; China
- Died: 1985 (aged 67–68); China
- Style: Neijia; Yiquan
- Teacher: Wang Xiangzhai

Yao Zongxun (simplified Chinese: 姚宗勋; traditional Chinese: 姚宗勛; pinyin: Yáo Zōngxūn; 1917–1985) was the formal successor of Wang Xiangzhai, founder of the martial art Yiquan. He is also the father of Yao Chengguang and Yao Chengrong both currently teaching in Beijing, China.
