= Li Luoneng =

Chinese martial artist (1807–1888)

李洛能 Li Luoneng
- Born: 1807; Hebei province, China
- Died: 1888 (aged 80–81); China
- Other names: "Divine Fist Li"
- Style: Neijia; Xinyiquan; Tongbeiquan; Gongliquan
- Teacher(s): Dai Wenxiong
- Rank: Founder of modern Xingyiquan

Other information
- Notable students: Guo Yunshen

Li Luoneng (Chinese: 李洛能) (1807–1888) was a Chinese martial artist from Shen County, Hebei. He was also known by several other names, including Li Feiyu (李飞羽), Li Nengran (能然), and Li Nengjiang, and was nicknamed "Divine Fist Li". Li learned the internal martial art of Xinyi (Heart and Intention Boxing) from Dai Wenxiong, the son of Dai Long Bang, and later modified the style into Xingyiquan (Form and Intention Boxing).

Luoneng initially studied local martial arts, such as Bafaquan, in his hometown of Shen County, Hebei, before traveling to Shanxi Province to study with his teacher. By 1836, he had excelled in the martial arts of Tongbei and Gongliquan. To study Xinyi, he journeyed to Shanxi to learn from Dai Wenxiong. Although Dai initially refused to teach him, Li eventually convinced him by acquiring a plot of land and starting a farm in the area. Li grew vegetables and delivered his produce to the market daily, providing the Dai family with free produce. This act of goodwill led Dai Wenxiong to accept Li as a student. Li Luoneng trained with Master Dai for ten years and became one of the most renowned Xinyi masters of his time, helping to popularize the art.

Luoneng introduced several modifications to the style he learned from his teacher. He replaced the Piguaquan technique, which involves a splitting fist, with a palm strike. Additionally, he changed the name from Xinyi (Heart and Intention Boxing) to Xingyi (Form and Intention Boxing). Later, he had a number of students; one of his students, Guo Yunshen, became the teacher of Wang Xiangzhai, who later popularized the Qigong exercise known as Zhan zhuang (post standing).
