= Dai Longbang =

戴龍邦 Dai Longbang
- Born: 1732; Shanxi, China
- Died: 1801 (aged 68–69); China
- Style: Neijia; Xinyiquan; Taijiquan
- Teacher(s): Cao Jiwu

Other information
- Notable students: Dai Wenxiong (son)

Dai Longbang (Chinese: 戴龍邦) (1732?–1801) was a Chinese master of the internal martial art of Xinyiquan (Heart and Intention Boxing), the precursor of Xingyiquan (Form and Intention Boxing). He was from Shanxi province. His brother Dai Lin Bang was also a master of Xinyi. Dai Long Bang's teacher was Cao Jiwu. Prior to learning from Cao Jiwu, Dai Long Bang was already a master in Taijiquan.

Dai Longbang further developed Xinyi and wrote the book “The Six Harmonies Fists”, which constitutes the written classics of the style. As a result, Xinyi also became known as “The Dai Family style” and Dai Long Bang has thus been credited with the creation of Xinyi. However, Dai Long Bang himself states in his book that he did not create Xinyi Quan.

The Dai brothers were in the vegetable wholesale business, and did not publicly teach to others outside their family. However, after many years of keeping the art within the family, Dai Long Bang's son Dai Wenxiong accepted Li Luoneng as a student, who went on to become a very famous martial artist, and a popularizer of the art. It was Li Luoneng who modified Xinyi and called it Xingyi.
