= Xingqi (circulating breath) =

Chinese breath-control techniques

Xingqi Circulating Breath
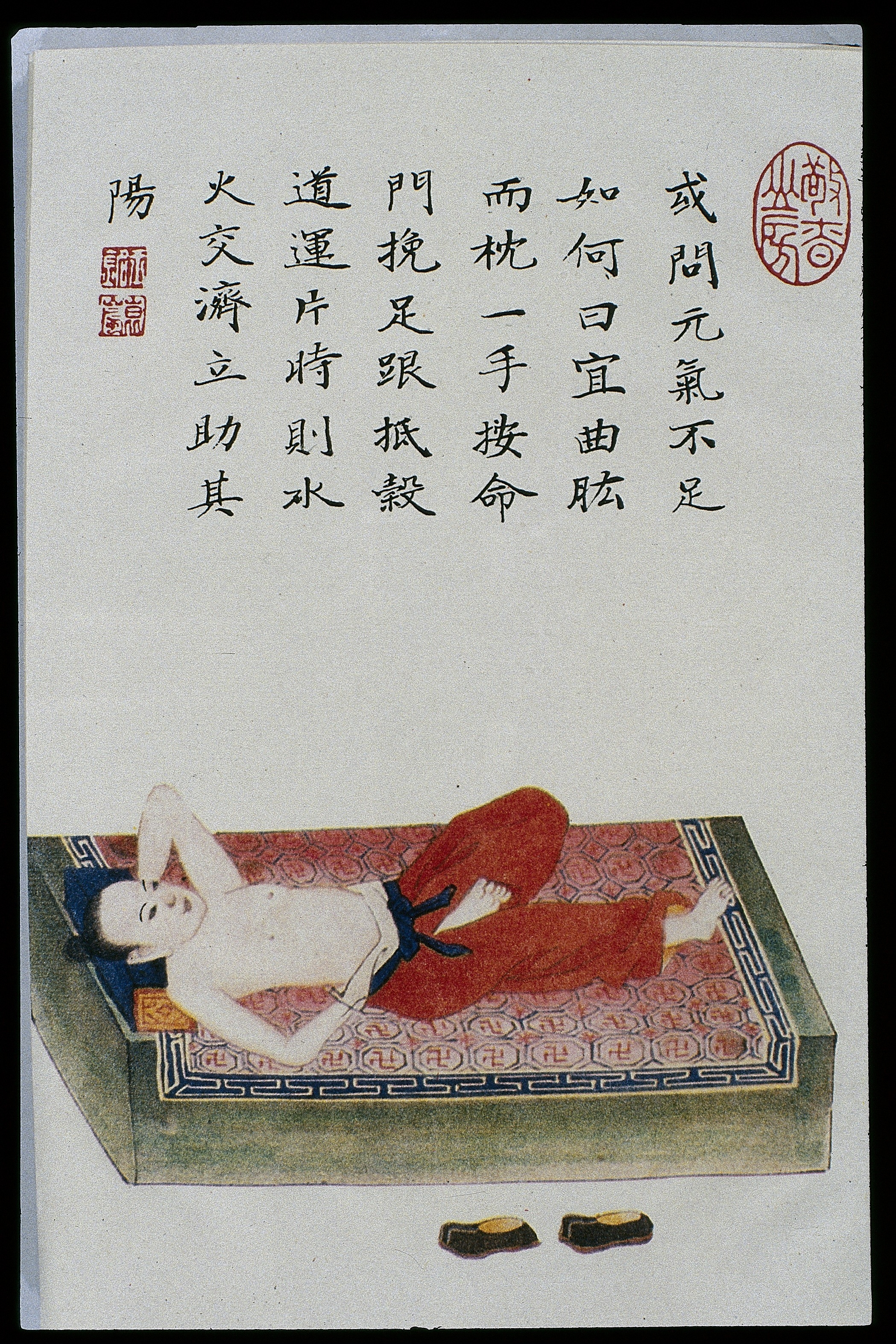
- Daoyin technique for conserving one's Yuanqi (Original Qi), 1875 Daoyin tu (導引圖, Drawings of Guiding and Pulling [Qi Circulation])

Chinese name
- Traditional Chinese: 行氣
- Simplified Chinese: 行气
Transcriptions
Standard Mandarin
- Hanyu Pinyin: xíngqì
- Wade–Giles: hsing^{2}-chʻi^{4}
Yue: Cantonese
- Jyutping: hang^{4} hei^{3}
Southern Min
- Hokkien POJ: hêng-khì
Middle Chinese
- Middle Chinese: hængH khjɨjH
Old Chinese
- Baxter–Sagart (2014): *[ɡ]ˁraŋ-s [k]ʰəp-s

Korean name
- Hangul: 행기
- Hanja: 行氣
Transcriptions
- Revised Romanization: haenggi

Japanese name
- Kanji: 行気
- Hiragana: ぎょうき
Transcriptions
- Revised Hepburn: gyōki

xingqi (Chinese: 行氣; trans. "circulating qi / breath") is a group of breath-control techniques that have been developed and practiced from the Warring States period (c. 475-221 BCE) to the present. Examples include Traditional Chinese medicine, Daoist meditation, daoyin breathing calisthenics, taixi embryonic breathing, neidan internal alchemy, neigong internal exercises, qigong deep-breathing exercises, and taijiquan slow-motion martial art. Since the polysemous keyword qi can mean natural "breath; air" and/or alleged supernatural "vital breath; life force", xingqi signifies "circulating breath" in meditational contexts or "activating vital breath" in medical contexts.

== Terminology ==
Shang dynasty Oracle bone script of 行; xing

Qin dynasty Slip script of 氣; qi

Xíngqì (行氣) is a linguistic compound of two Chinese words:

- Xíng (行) has English translation equivalents of:
1. to march in order, as soldiers; walk forward ...
2. to move, proceed, act; perform(ance); actor, agent; follower ...
3. to engage in; to conduct; to effect, put into practice, implement ...
4. pre-verbal indicator of future action, "is going to [verb]."
5. temporary, transient ...
6. to leave, depart from. ...

In Standard Chinese phonology, this character 行 is usually pronounced as rising second tone xíng above, but also can be pronounced as falling fourth tone xìng (行) meaning "actions, conduct, behavior, custom(ary); [Buddhism] conditioned states, conditioned things [translation of Sanskrit Saṅkhāra]" or second tone háng (行) "walkway, road; column, line, row, e.g., of soldiers, serried mountains, written text".

- Qì (氣) has equivalents of:
1. effluvium, vapor(ous); fumes; exhalation, breath(e).
2. vital breath, pneuma, energizing breath, lifeforce, material force. ... vitality, energy; zest, spirit; zeal, gusto; inspiration; aspiration. power, strength; impelling force.
3. air, aura, atmosphere; climate, weather. ... flavor; smell, scent.
4. disposition, mood, spirit; temper(ament); mettle, fortitude. ...

In terms of Chinese character classification, xíng (行) was originally a pictograph of "crossroads", and qì (氣) is a compound ideograph with qì (气; "air; gas; vapor") and mǐ (米; "rice"), creating "气 steam rising from 米 rice as it cooks". Qi has an uncommon variant character (炁) that is especially used in "magical" Daoist talismans, charms, and petitions.

The unabridged Hanyu Da Cidian ("Comprehensive Chinese Word Dictionary"), which is lexicographically comparable to the Oxford English Dictionary, defines xingqi in three meanings:

1. 道教语. 指呼吸吐纳等养生方法的内修功夫. [Daoist term. Refers to internal practices of breathing, exhaling, inhaling, and other methods of nourishing life.]
2. 中医指输送精气. [Traditional Chinese medicine. Refers to conveying essence and qi.]
3. 指使气血畅通. [Refers to making qi and blood flow unobstructed.]

There is no standard English translation of Chinese xingqi, as evident in:

- "leading the breath", "guiding the breath"
- "circulation of the [qi]"
- "circulate vapor"
- "circulation of pneumas"
- "circulating breath"
- "Moving the Vapors"
- "circulating the qi"
- "pneuma circulation"

Within this sample, xing is most often translated as "circulate/circulating/circulation", but owing to the polysemous meanings of qi it is rendered as "breath", "vapor(s)", "pneuma(s)", or transliterated as qi. Nathan Sivin rejected translating with the ancient Greek word pneuma ("breath; spirit, soul" or "breath of life" in Stoicism) as too narrow for the semantic range of qi:

By 350 [BCE], when philosophy began to be systematic, qi meant air, breath, vapor, and other pneumatic stuff. It might be congealed or compacted in liquids or solids. Qi also referred to the balanced and ordered vitalities or energies, partly derived from the air we breathe, that cause physical changes and maintain life. These are not distinct meanings.

The term qi (氣) is "so basic to Chinese worldviews, yet so multivalent in its meanings, spanning senses normally distinguished in the West, that a single satisfying Western language translation has so far proved elusive".

In Chinese medical terminology, xíngqì (行氣; "promote the circulation of qì; activate vital energy") parallels xíngxuè or colloquial xíngxiě (行血; "promote circulation of blood; activate the blood"), and is expanded in the phrasemes xíngqìsànjié (行氣散結; "set the qì in motion and disperse congelation") and xíngqìkāiyù (行氣; "activate vital energy and release stagnation of emotions").

Yùnqì (運氣; "control the breath; move qì through the body") is a near-synonym of xingqi (行氣; "circulate the breath").

- Yùn (運) has translation equivalents of:
1. turn round, revolve, circumvolve; rotate, gyre; … cyclic movement of the universe; turn of fortune or destiny; phase …
2. transport, displace; move, convey; advance …
3. make use of, ply, wield; handle, manage. …

When qi is pronounced with a neutral tone, yùnqi (運氣) means "turn of events; luck, fortune, happiness".

== Textual examples ==
Methods for circulating breath are attested during the Warring States period (c. 475-221 BCE), continued during the Han dynasty (202 BCE-220 CE), became well known during the Six Dynasties (222-589), and developed during the Tang (618-907) and Song (960-1279) periods.

=== Warring States period ===
In the history of Daoist meditation, several Warring States texts allude to or describe breath-control meditations, but none directly mention xingqi (行氣). Good examples are found in the Zhuangzi and the Guanzi Neiye ("Inner Training") chapter.

One Zhuangzi context criticizes breath exercises and daoyin "guiding and pulling" calisthenics: "Blowing and breathing, exhaling and inhaling, expelling the old and taking in the new, bear strides and bird stretches [熊經鳥申]—all this is merely indicative of the desire for longevity." Another context praises "breathing from the heels: "The true man of old did not dream when he slept and did not worry when he was awake. His food was not savory, his breathing was deep. The breathing of the true man is from his heels [踵], the breathing of the common man is from his throat [喉]." The Zhuangzi translator Victor Mair notes the "close affinities between the Daoist sages and the ancient Indian holy men. Yogic breath control and asanas (postures) were common to both traditions," and suggests that "breathing from the heels" could be "a modern explanation of the sirsasana 'supported headstand'".

Neiye Verse 24 summarizes Inner Training breath control, which "appears to be a meditative technique in which the adept concentrates on nothing but the Way, or some representation of it. It is to be undertaken when you are sitting in a calm and unmoving position, and it enables you to set aside the disturbances of perceptions, thoughts, emotions, and desires that normally fill your conscious mind.".

Expand your heart-mind and release it [大心而敢].
Relax your qi and allow it to extend [寬氣而廣].
When your body is calm and unmoving,
Guard the One [守一] and discard myriad disturbances.
You will see profit and not be enticed by it.
You will see harm and not be frightened by it.
Relaxed and unwound, and yet free from selfishness,
In solitude you will find joy in your own being.
This is what we call "circulating the qi" [是謂雲氣].
Your awareness and practice appear celestial [意行似天]. (24, tr. Komjathy 2003: n.p.).

Translating "circulating the qi" follows Guanzi commentaries that interpret this original yún (雲; "cloud") as a variant Chinese character for yùn (運; "transport; move"), thus reading yùnqì (運氣; "control the breath; move qì through the body").

Besides the Warring States-era received texts that mention breath circulation techniques, the earliest direct evidence is a Chinese jade artifact known as the Xingqi yupei ming (行气玉佩铭; "Breath Circulation Jade Pendant Inscription") or Xingqi ming (行气铭; "Breath Circulation Inscription"). This 45-character rhymed explanation entitled 行氣; Xíngqì; "circulating the (vital) breath" was inscribed on a dodecagonal block of jade, tentatively identified as either a knob for a staff or a pendant for hanging from a belt. While the dating is uncertain, estimates range from approximately middle 6th century BCE to early 3rd century BCE. This lapidary text combines nine trisyllabic phrases describing the stages of breath circulation with four explanatory phrases. The Xingqi jade inscription says:

行氣
深則蓄
蓄則伸
伸則下
下則定
定則固
固則萌
萌則長
長則退
退則天
天幾舂在上
地幾舂在下
順則生
逆則死

To circulate the Vital Breath
Breathe deeply, then it will collect.
When it is collected, it will expand.
When it expands, it will descend.
When it descends, it will become stable.
When it is stable, it will be regular.
When it is regular, it will sprout.
When it sprouts, it will grow.
When it grows, it will recede.
When it recedes, it will become heavenly.
The dynamism of Heaven is revealed in the ascending;
The dynamism of Earth is revealed in the descending.
Follow this and you will live;
oppose it and you will die.

=== Han dynasty ===
Han dynasty (202 BCE-220 CE) historical, medical, and philosophical texts mention circulating breath.

The Shiji (Records of the Grand Historian), compiled by Sima Tan and his son Sima Qian from the late 2nd century BCE to early 1st century CE, says turtles and tortoises are able to practice xingqi and daoyin. Shiji Chapter 128 Guice liezhuan (龜策列傳; "Arrayed Traditions of Tortoise and Yarrow-stalk [Diviners]"), which Chu Shaosun (褚少孫, c. 104-30 BCE) appended with a text on sacred tortoises used in plastromancy, claims that the longevity of tortoises results from xingqi breath circulation and daoyin calisthenics: "An old man in south used a tortoise as a leg for his bed, and died after more than ten years. When his bed was removed, the tortoise was still alive. Tortoises are able to practice breath circulation and calisthenics [南方老人用龜支床足 行十餘歲 老人死 移床 龜尚生不死 龜能行氣導引].

Ge Hong's 4th-century Baopuzi (below) quotes Shiji 128 with a different version of this tortoise-bed legend [江淮閒居人為兒時 以龜枝床 至後老死 家人移床 而龜故生], with young rather than old men.

When the men living between the Yangtze and the Huai are young, they place their beds on tortoises, and their families do not remove the beds until those boys have died of old age." Thus, these animals have lived at least fifty or sixty years, and, given that they can dispense this long with food or drink and still not die, it shows that they are far different from common creatures. Why should we doubt that they can last a thousand years? Isn't there good reason for the Genii Classics to suggest we imitate the breathing of the tortoise?

Another interpretation is putting a tortoise into, rather than on a bed. "It is allegedly common in the area of the Yangtse and the Huai to put a tortoise into the bed in childhood; when people die of old age, the tortoise is still alive. This Baopuzi context repeatedly mentions cranes and tortoises (Chinese exemplars of longevity) using daoyin calisthenics without xingqi. For instance, "Knowing the great age attained by tortoises and cranes, he imitates their calisthenics so as to augment his own life span"; "Therefore, God's Men merely ask us to study the method by which these animals extend their years through calisthenics and to model ourselves on their eschewing of starches through the consumption of breath"; "the tortoise and the crane have a special understanding of calisthenics and diet".

The c. 2nd-century to 1st-century BCE Huangdi neijing (Inner Canon of the Yellow Emperor) uses xingqi (行氣) five times in the Suwen (素問; "Basic Questions") and three in the Lingshu Jing (靈樞; "Spiritual Pivot") sections. For instances, the Suwen (經脈別論; "Treatise on How to Distinguish the Vascular System") section says,

The force of the pulse flows into the arteries (經) and the force of the arteries ascends into the lungs; the lungs send it into all the pulses (百脈), which then transport its essence to the skin and the body hair. The entire vascular system unites with the secretions [毛脈合精] and passes the force of life on to a storehouse [行氣於腑], which stores the energy and vitality and intelligence. These are then transmitted to the four (parts of the body), and the vital forces of the viscera are restored to their order.

And Suwen (太陰陽明論, Treatise on the Region of the Great Tin and on the Region of the 'Sunlight') says,

The Great Yin of the foot means (relates to) the three Yin. Its communication by way of the stomach is subject to the spleen and is connected with the throat; thus it is the great Yin which causes the communication to the three parts of Yin [故太陰為之行氣於三陰]. … The five viscera and the six hollow organs are like an ocean (a reservoir 海). They also serve to transport vigor to the three regions of Yang [亦為之行氣於三陽]. The viscera and the hollow organs, in reliance upon their direct communication, receive vigor from the region of the 'sunlight'. Thus they cause the stomach to transport its fluid secretions.

The c. 139 BCE Huainanzi is a Chinese collection of essays that blends Daoist, Confucianist, and Legalist concepts, especially including yin and yang and Wuxing (Five Phases/Agents) theories. In particular, the wuzang (五臟; "Five Orbs/Viscera; heart, liver, spleen, lungs, and kidneys") are important to the Huainanzi because they provide a conceptual bridge among the cosmic, physiological, and cognitive realms. In medical theory, each of the Five Orbs was correlated with one of the Five Phases of qi and was understood to be responsible for the generation and circulation of its particular form of qi throughout the mind-body system." Xingqi does not occur in this eclectic text but the "Originating in the Way" chapter describes circulating blood and qì: "The mind is the master of the Five Orbs. It regulates and directs the Four Limbs and circulates the blood and vital energy [流行血氣], gallops through the realms of accepting and rejecting, and enters and exits through the gateways and doorways of the hundreds of endeavors.

The c. 1st-century CE Baihu Tong text, which is traditionally attributed to Ban Gu (32–92 CE), frequently mentions the Wuxing (Five Elements or Five Phases). Tianxingqi (天行氣; "Heavenly Circulation of Qi") occurs in The Five Elements section explaining the xing (行) in wuxing: "What is meant by the 'Five Elements' wu-hsing [五行]? Metal, wood, water, fire, and earth. The word hsing is used to bring out the meaning that [in accordance] with Heaven the fluids have been 'put into motion' hsing [天行氣]." Wuxingqi (五行氣; "Five-Phases Qi") occurs in the "Instinct and Emotion" section: "Why are there five Instincts [五性] and six Emotions [六情]? Man by nature lives by containing the fluids of the Six Pitch-pipes [六律] and the Five Elements [五行氣]. Therefore, he has in [his body] the Five Reservoirs [五藏] and the Six Storehouses [六府], through which the Instincts and Emotions go in and out."

=== Six dynasties ===
The historical term "Six Dynasties" collectively refers to the Three Kingdoms (220–280 CE), Jin Dynasty (265–420), and Southern and Northern Dynasties (420–589).

The c. 3rd-4th century Huangting jing (黃庭經; "Scripture of the Yellow Court") contrasts the respiration of ordinary people and Daoists inhaling through the nose and exhaling through the mouth. Ordinary people's breath supposedly descends from the nose to the kidneys, traverses the Five Viscera (kidneys, heart, liver, spleen, and lungs), then the Six Receptacles (gall bladder, stomach, large intestine, small intestine, triple burner, and bladder), where it is blocked by the "Origin of the Barrier, [關元; guanyuan, the Bl-26 acupuncture point], the double door of which is closed with a key and guarded by the gods of the spleen, both clad in red," whereupon the breath rises to the mouth and is exhaled. Daoist adepts knew how to control their breath to open these doors and lead it to the Lower Cinnabar Field or Ocean of Breath [氣海; qihai], three inches below the navel.

Then is the moment of "leading the breath", [xingqi], in such a way that "the breaths of the Nine Heavens (= the inhaled air), which have entered the man's nose, make the tour of the body and are poured into the Palace of the Brain". The "breath is led" by Interior Vision, [neiguan], thanks to which the Adept sees the inside of his own body and, concentrating his thought, steers the breath and guides it, following it by sight through all the veins and passages of the body. Thus it is led where one wishes. If one is sick (that is, if some passage inside the body is obstructed and hampers the regular passage of air), that is where one leads it to reestablish circulation, which produces healing.

The adept then circulates the Ocean of Breath to ascend the spinal column into the Upper Cinnabar Field (brain), go back down to the Middle Cinnabar Field (heart), when it is expelled by the lungs and goes out through the mouth.

The Jin dynasty Daoist scholar Ge Hong's 318 Baopuzi ("Master Who Embraces Simplicity") frequently mentions xingqi; written (行氣, with the standard qi character) 13 times and (行炁, with the qi variant character typically used in magical Daoist talismans) 11 times. In this text, the term xingqi "loosely designates various practices in which breath is swallowed and then systematically circulated (often guided by visualization) throughout the body. Such practices were often understood as substituting pure cosmic pneumas for ordinary foods (especially grains and meats) as the staples of one's diet." In several of Ge Hong's discussions of the sexual arts of self-cultivation, his consistent position is that they, "along with the circulation of pneumas, are necessary supplements [補; bu] to the ingestion of elixirs for the attainment of transcendence."

Chapter 8 (釋滯; "Resolving Hesitations" provides more detailed information about xingqi than any other Baopuzi chapter. First, breath circulation should be practiced along with controlling ejaculation and taking Daoist drugs.

If you wish to seek divinity or geniehood [i.e., xian transcendence], you need only acquire the quintessence, which consists in treasuring your sperm [寶精], circulating your breaths [行炁], and taking one crucial medicine [服一大藥]. That is all! There are not a multitude of things to do. In these three pursuits, however, one must distinguish between the profound and the shallow. You cannot learn all about them promptly unless you meet with a learned teacher and work very, very hard. Many things may be dubbed circulation of the breaths, but there are only a few methods for doing it correctly. Other things may be dubbed good sexual practice, but its true recipe involves almost a hundred or more different activities. Something may be dubbed a medicine to be taken, but there are roughly a thousand such prescriptions.

Second, Ge Hong lists the supernatural powers of xingqi and connects it with taixi embryonic breathing.

Through circulation of the breaths [行炁] illnesses can be cured, plague need not be fled, snakes and tigers can be charmed, bleeding from wounds can be halted, one may stay under water or walk on it, be free from hunger and thirst, and protract one's years. The most important part of it is simply to breathe like a fetus [胎息]. He who succeeds in doing this will do his breathing as though in the womb, without using nose or mouth, and for him the divine Process has been achieved.

Third, he describes how a beginning xingqi breath circulation practitioner should count their heartbeats to measure time during biqi (閉氣; "breath holding").

When first learning to circulate the breaths, one inhales through the nose and closes up that breath. After holding it quietly for 120 heartbeats [approximately 90 seconds], it is expelled in tiny quantities through the mouth. During the exhalations and inhalations one should not hear the sound of one's own breathing, and one should always exhale less than one inhales. A goose feather held before the nose and mouth during the exhalations should not move. After some practice the number of heartbeats may be increased very gradually to one thousand [approx. 12 minutes 30 seconds], before the breath is released. Once this is achieved, the aged will become one day younger each day.

The current world record for static apnea (without prior breathing of 100% oxygen) is 11 minutes and 35 seconds (Stéphane Mifsud, 8 June 2009).

Fourth, using the ancient Chinese daily division between shengqi (生炁; "living breath", from midnight to noon") and siqi (死炁; "dead breath", from noon to midnight"), it warns, "The circulating of the breaths must be done at an hour when breath is alive, not when it is dead. … No benefit is derived from practicing the circulating when breath is dead." Fifth, Ge advises maintaining moderation and tells an anecdote about his great-uncle Ge Xuan (164-244), a legendary Daoist who first received the Lingbao School scriptures.

It must be admitted, however, that it is man's nature to engage in multiple pursuits and he is little inclined to the peace and quiet requisite to the pursuit of this process. For the circulation of the breaths it is essential that the processor refrain from overeating. When fresh vegetables, and fatty and fresh meats are consumed, the breaths, becoming strengthened, are hard to preserve. Hate and anger are also forbidden. Overindulgence in them throws the breaths into confusion, and when they are not calmed they turn into shouting. For these reasons few persons can practice this art. My ancestral uncle, Ko Hsüan, merely because he was able to hoard his breaths and breathe like a fetus, would stay on the bottom of a deep pool for almost a whole day whenever he was thoroughly intoxicated and it was a hot summer's day.

Compare the above claim that with breath circulation, "one may stay under water or walk on it."

The Baopuzi repeatedly describes practicing xingqi breath circulation along with other longevity techniques, such as drug consumption and Daoist sexual practices above, which warns "one must distinguish between the profound and the shallow". Another context compares these same three methods.

The taking of medicines [服藥] may be the first requirement for enjoying Fullness of Life [長生], but the concomitant practice of breath circulation [行氣] greatly enhances speedy attainment of the goal. Even if medicines [神藥] are not attainable and only breath circulation is practiced, a few hundred years will be attained provided the scheme is carried out fuIly, but one must also know the art of sexual intercourse [房中之術] to achieve such extra years. If ignorance of the sexual art causes frequent losses of sperm to occur, it will be difficult to have sufficient energy to circulate the breaths.

Chapter 8 mentions the inherent dangers for Daoist adepts who overspecialize in studying a particular technique.

In everything pertaining to the nurturing of life [養生] one must learn much and make the essentials one's own; look widely and know how to select. There can be no reliance upon one particular specialty, for there is always the danger that breadwinners will emphasize their personal specialties. That is why those who know recipes for sexual intercourse [房中之術] say that only these recipes can lead to geniehood. Those who know breathing procedures [吐納] claim that only circulation of the breaths [行氣] can prolong our years. Those knowing methods for bending and stretching [屈伸] say that only calisthenics can exorcize old age. Those knowing herbal prescriptions [草木之方] say that only through the nibbling of medicines can one be free from exhaustion. Failures in the study of the divine process are due to such specializations.

In a final example, Ge Hong gives practical advice for avoiding illness.

If you are going to do everything possible to nurture your life [養生], you will take the divine medicines [神藥]. In addition, you will never weary of circulating your breaths [行氣]; morning and night you will do calisthenics [導引] to circulate your blood and breaths and see that they do not stagnate. In addition to these things, you will practice sexual intercourse in the right fashion [房中之術]; you will eat and drink moderately; you will avoid drafts and dampness; you will not trouble about things that are not within your competence. Do all these things, and you will not fall sick.

Taking a fundamentally pragmatic position on yangsheng Nourishing Life practices, Ge Hong believes that "the perfection of any one method can only be attained in conjunction with several others."

While several Baopuzi contexts mention healing oneself with breath circulation, one records using it to heal another person. During the Eastern Wu dynasty (222-280), there was a Daoist master named Shi Chun (石春) "who would not eat in order to hasten the cure when he was treating a sick person by circulating his own breath. It would sometimes be a hundred days or only a month before he ate again." When Emperor Jing of Wu (r. 258–364) heard about this he said, "In a short time this man is going to starve to death", and ordered that Shi be locked up and guarded constantly without food or water, excepting a few quarts he requested for making holy water. After more than a year of imprisonment, his "complexion became ever fresher and his strength remained normal." The emperor then asked him how much longer he could continue like this, and Shi Chun replied that "there was no limit; possibly several dozen years, his only fear being that he might die of old age, but it would not be of hunger." The emperor discontinued the fasting experiment and released him. The Baopuzi bibliography of Daoist texts lists the Xingqi zhibing jing (行氣治病經; "Scripture on Treating Illness with Breath Circulation"), which was subsequently lost.

Besides the Baopuzi, Ge Hong also compiled the Shenxian Zhuan (Biographies of Divine Transcendents), in which ten hagiographies mention adepts practicing xingqi along with other methods and techniques.

- Peng Zu "lived past eight hundred; ate cassia and mushrooms; and excelled at 'guiding and pulling' (daoyin) and at circulating pneumas." In another textual version, "If there was any illness, fatigue, or discomfort in his body, he would 'guide and pull' (導引) and shut off his breath so as to attack what was troubling him. He would fix his heart by turns on each part of his body: his head and face, his nine orifices and five viscera, his four limbs, even his hair. In each case he would cause his heart to abide there, and he would feel his breath circulate throughout his body, starting at his nose and mouth and reaching down into his ten fingers."
- Laozi "made available many methods for transcending the world, including, [first of all,] [formulas for] nine elixirs and eight minerals, Liquor of Jade and Gold Liquor; next, methods for mentally fixing on the mystic and unsullied, meditating on spirits and on the Monad [守一], successively storing and circulating pneumas, refining one's body and dispelling disasters, averting evil and controlling ghosts, nourishing one's nature and avoiding grains, transforming oneself [so as to] overcome trouble, keeping to the teachings and precepts, and dispatching demons".
- Liu Gen (劉根) "eventually taught Wang Zhen [王真] how to meditate on the Monad, circulate pneumas, and visualize [his corporeal] spirits, and also methods for sitting astride the Mainstays and Strands [of the heavens] and for confessing one's transgressions and submitting one's name on high."
- Gan Shi (甘始) "excelled at circulating pneumas. He did not eat [a normal diet] but ingested [only] asparagus root [天門冬; tianmen dong]."
- Kong Anguo "habitually circulated pneumas and ingested lead and cinnabar (or "an elixir made from lead"). He reached three hundred years of age and had the appearance of a boy".
- Bo He (帛和) received from the physician Dong Feng his "methods of circulating pneumas, ingesting atractylis, and avoiding grains".
- She Zheng (涉正) transmitted to all his disciples "[methods of] circulating pneumas, bedchamber [arts], and the ingestion of a lesser elixir made from 'stony brains' [geodes]."
- Zhang Ling (c. 34–156) " As for his circulation of pneumas and dietetic regimen, he relied on [standard] methods of transcendence; here, [as with methods of curing illness], he made no significant changes."
- Dong Zhong (董仲) "From his youth he practiced pneuma circulation and refined his body. When he had reached an age of over a hundred, he still had not aged [in appearance]."
- Huang Jing (黄敬) "is said to have circulated pneumas, abstained from grains, subsisted on his saliva, practiced embryonic breathing and interior vision, summoned the liujia and jade maidens, and swallowed talismans of yin and yang."

=== Tang dynasty ===
The Taiqing xingqi fu (太清行氣符; "Great Clarity Talisman for Circulating Breath"), from the 730 Fuqi jingyi lun (服氣精義論; "Essay on the Essential Meaning of Ingesting Breath")

During the Tang dynasty (618-907), Daoists integrated new meditation theories and techniques from Chinese Buddhism and many seminal texts were written, especially during the 8th century.

The Daoist Shangqing School patriarch Sima Chengzhen 司馬承禎, 647–735) composed the 730 Fuqi jingyi lun (服氣精義論; "Essay on the Essential Meaning of Breath Ingestion"), which presented integrated outlines of health practices, with both traditional Chinese physical techniques and the Buddhist-inspired practice of guan (觀; "insight meditation"), as preliminaries for attaining and realizing the Dao. The text is divided into nine sections (論; lun; "essays; discourses" describing the consecutive steps toward attaining purification and longevity.

The second section "On the Ingestion of Breath" (服氣論; Fuqi lun) gives several methods for adepts to become independent of ordinary breathing, first absorb qi as breath, then guide it internally, and store it in their inner organs. Adepts begin by absorbing the 太清行氣符; Taiqing xingqi fu; "Great Clarity Talisman for [Facilitating] Qi Circulation", which enables one to gradually abstain from eating grains. They then ingest qi by visualizing the first rays of the rising sun, guide it through the body and viscera, until they can permanently "retain the qi". Sima Chengzhen points out that when one begins abstaining from foods and survives only by ingesting qi breath (and repeats this warning for taking drugs), the immediate effect will be undergoing a phase of weakening and decay, but eventually strength returns all illnesses vanish. Only after nine years of further practice will an adept rightfully be called a zhenren ("Realized One; Perfected Person").

The Taiqing wanglao fuqi koujue (太清王老服氣口訣; "The Venerable Wang's Instructions for Absorbing Qi, a Taiqing Scripture") differentiates two methods of breath circulation.

There were two ways of making it circulate [運氣; yunqi]. Concentrating the will to direct it to a particular place, such as the brain, or the site of some local malady, was termed [行氣; xingqi]. Visualising its flow in thought was "inner vision" [內視; neishi, 內觀; neiguan], differentiated (not very convincingly to us) from ordinary imagination. "Closing one's eyes, one has an inner vision of the five viscera, one can clearly distinguish them, one knows the place of each…"

The c. 745 Yanling xiansheng ji xinjiu fuqi jing (延陵先生集新舊服氣經; "Scripture on New and Old Methods for the Ingestion of Breath Collected by the Elder of Yanling") defines the technique: "One must carefully pull the breath while inspiring and expiring so that the Original Breath (yuanqi 元氣) does not exit the body. Thus, the outer and inner breaths do not mix and one achieves embryonic breathing". This source also recommends the "method of the drum and of effort" (鼓努之法; gunu zhi fa) xingqi breath circulation for creating a Sacred Embryo.

At the times when you are guiding the Breath, beat the drum [a technical term meaning "grit the teeth"] and perform ten swallowings, twenty swallowings, so that your intestines are filled. After that concentrate upon guiding (the Breath) and making it penetrate into the four limbs. When you are practicing this method, guide the Breath once for each time you swallow. The hands and feet should be supported on things; wait until the Breath has penetrated, and then the heart must be emptied and the body forgotten; and thereupon the hot breath [煩蒸之氣; fanzheng zhi qi] will be dispersed throughout the four limbs; the breath of the Essential Flower [精華之氣; jinghua zhi qi], being coagulated, will return to the Ocean of Breath [氣海; qihai]. After some time, the Embryo will be completed spontaneously. By holding the joints of the members firm, you can succeed in having (the Breaths) answer one another with the sound of thunder; the drum resounds in the belly so that the Breaths are harmonized. "

Li Fengshi's (李奉時) c. 780 Songshan Taiwu Xiansheng Qi Jing (嵩山太無先生氣經; "Mr. Grand-Nothingness of Song Mountain's Scripture on Breath") discusses how one's yi (意; "intention; will") plays a major role in circulating breath. For instance, using biqi breath-holding to heal oneself.

If suddenly there is discomfort in cultivating and nourishing (the breath) or occasionally there is some kind of illness, go into a secluded room and follow this method: spread out your hands and feet, then harmonize the breath and swallow it down (guiding it in your thoughts) to where the trouble is. Shut off the breath. Use the will and the mind to regulate the breath in order to attack the ailment. When the breath has been retained to the extreme, exhale it. Then swallow it again. If the breathing is rapid, stop. If the breath is harmonious, work on the ailment again. … Even if the ailment is in your head, face, hands or feet, wherever it is, work on it. There is nothing that will not be cured. Note that when the mind wills the breath into the limbs, it works like magic, its effects are indescribable.

The Xingqijue (行氣訣; "Secret of Guiding the Breath") chapter describes circulating breaths between the upper and lower dantians (丹田; "elixir fields"): Niwan dantian (泥丸丹田; "muddy pellet elixir-field"), or naotian (腦宮; "brain palace") and Xia dantian (下丹田; "lower elixir-field"), above the perineum).

There are two points on the spine behind the lower [dantian]. They correspond through the ridge vein with the [niwan dantian] which is the brain palace (a point between the eyes above the root of the nose). The Original Breath [yuanqi] is obtained by storing (the breath of) every three consecutive swallowings in the lower [dantian]. Use the mind to take (the Original Breath) in and to make it enter the two points. (You should) imagine two columns of white breath going straight up on both sides of your spine and entering the [niwan] to becloud thickly the palace. Then the breath continues to your hair, your face, your neck, both arms and hands up and to your fingers. After a little time, it enters the chest and the middle [dantian] which is (by) the heart. It pours on into the five viscera, it passes the lower [dantian], and reaches [三里; sanli] (the Three Miles, i.e., the genitals) It goes through your hips, your knees, ankles and all the way to the [涌泉; yongquan] (acupuncture points) which are in the center of your feet soles. That is the so-called [謂分一氣而理] "to share one breath and manage it individually".

The late 8th-century Taiwu xiansheng fuqi fa (太無先生氣服氣) explains how to circulate the yuanqi Original Breath. Tang Daoist practitioners fundamentally changed the nature and understanding of taixi Embryonic Breathing from the ancient theory of waiqi (外氣; "external qi of the air; external breathing") to the new theory of neiqi (內氣; "internal qi") of one's organs; internal breathing"). Instead of inhaling and holding waiqi breath, adepts would circulate and remold visceral neiqi energy, which was believed to recreate the yuanqi (元氣; "prenatal qì; primary vitality") received at birth and gradually depleted during human life.

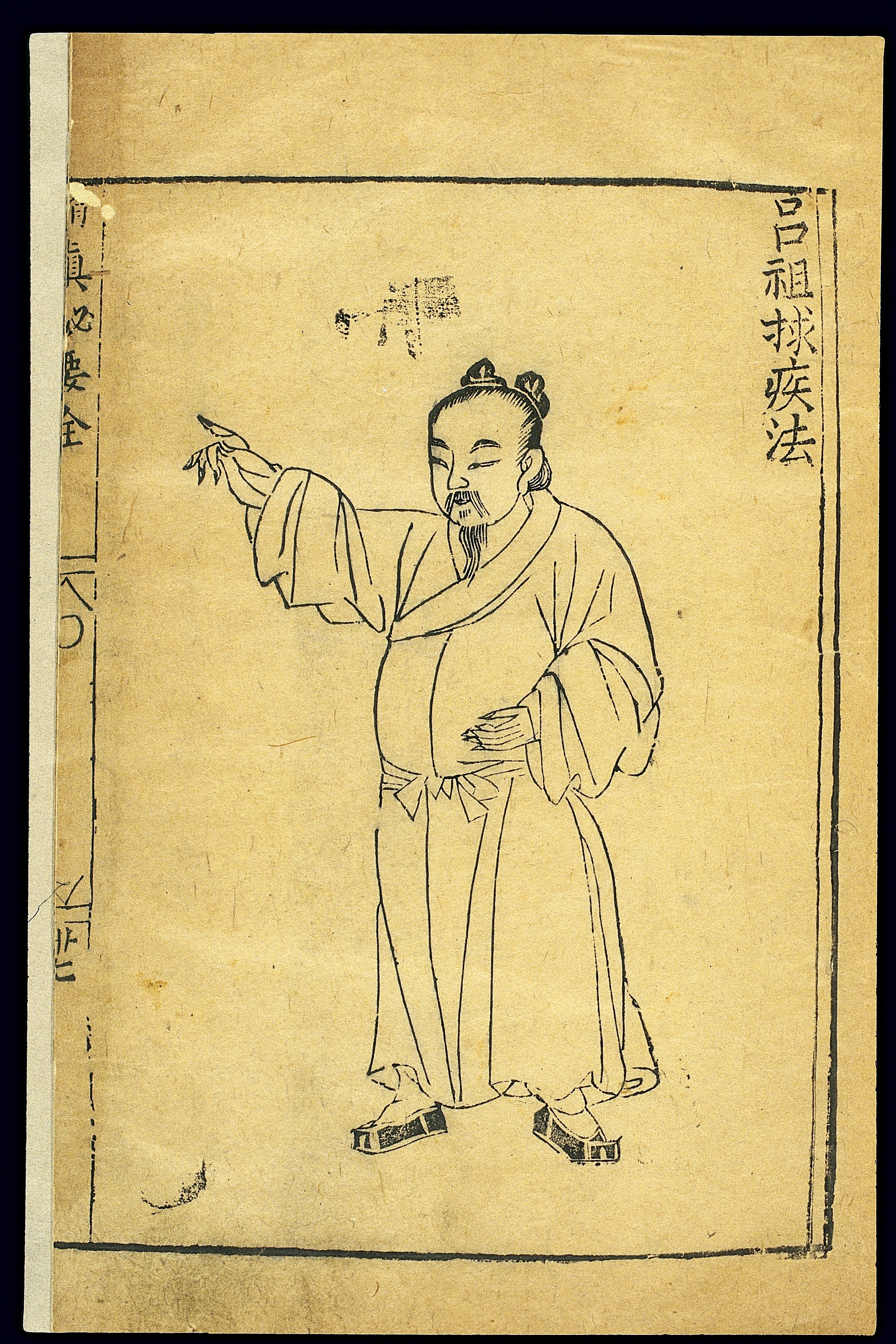
Qigong exercise to free blocked qi energy channels, Wang Cai's (王蔡) 1513 Xiuzhen miyao (修真秘要; "Essential Secrets on Cultivating Perfection")

According to the Taiwu xiansheng fuqi fa, since it is the Original Breath and not external breath which must be kept circulating through the body, and since its natural place is within the body, there is no need to make it enter or hold it in by effort as the ancients did: no retention of the breath, which is exhausting and, in some cases, harmful. But it does not follow that to make the breath circulate is an easy thing; on the contrary, it requires a lengthy apprenticeship. "The internal breath... is naturally in the body, it is not a breath which you go outside to seek; (but) if you do not get the explanations of an enlightened master, (all efforts) will be nothing but useless toil, and you will never succeed." Common ordinary respiration plays only a secondary role in the mechanism of Breath circulation, which goes on outside it. The two breaths, internal and external, carry on their movements in perfect correspondence. When the external breath ascends during inhalation, the internal breath contained in the lower Cinnabar Field also rises; when the external breath descends, the internal breath descends too and returns again to the lower Cinnabar Field. Such is the simple mechanism which governs the circulation of Original Breath.

This is done in two phases: "swallowing the breath" [咽氣; yanqi] and making it circulate. And if there is only a single way of absorbing the Breath, there are two distinct ways of making it circulate. One consists of leading it so as to guide it where one wishes it to go, to an afflicted area if it is to cure a malady, to the [niwan] if Embryonic Respiration is the purpose, and so on. This is what is called "guiding the breath" [xingqi]. The other consists of letting the breath go where it will through the body without interfering by guiding it. This is what is called "refining the breath" [lianqi]. I shall point out in succession the methods for absorbing the breath, for guiding it, and for refining it. It is the first of these two pulses. Absorbing the Breath, which is properly to be called Embryonic Respiration [taixi]: but the expression is applied also to the exercises in toto.

=== Song dynasty ===
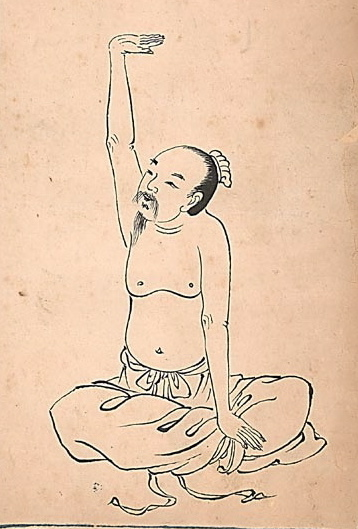
Baduanjin qigong Separate Heaven and Earth meditation, Qing dynasty

Xingqi breath circulation continued developing during the Song (960-1279).

Among the many progressive series of Daoist breath-circulating exercises ascribed to famous masters such as Chisongzi and Pengzu, one more complex set is attributed to the lesser-known Master Ning, the Ning xiansheng daoyin fa (寧先生導引法; "Master Ning's Gymnastic Method"). According to traditions, Master Ning was the Yellow Emperor's Director of Potters (陶正; taozheng). "He could gather up fire and not burn himself, and he went up and down with the smoke; his clothes never burned." His method "was a series of magical procedures endowed with a specific efficacy, allowing one to go into fire without being burned and into water without drowning, in imitation of Master Ning himself. It included a method of guiding the breath, [xingqi], and contained four series of exercises in which rhythmic breathing, retention of breath, and movements of arms, legs, head, and torso were done successively." Each of these series was named after a particular animal: the breath-guiding procedures of the Toad, Tortoise, Wild Goose, and Dragon, with exercises representing the movements and breathing of these animals. For instance, the "Dragon Procedure of Circulating the Breath":

1. Bow the head and look down; remain without breathing (the equivalent of) twelve (respirations).
2. With both hands massage from the belly down to the feet; take the feet and pull them up to under the arms; remain without breathing (the equivalent of) twelve (respirations).
3. Place the hands on the nape of the neck and clasp them there"

Ceng Cao's (曾造) 12th-century Taijing daoyin yangsheng jing quotes Master Ning: "Guiding the Breath, [xingqi], controls the inside, and Gymnastics, [daoyin], controls the outside."

== See also ==
- Anapanasati, Buddhist mindfulness of breathing
- Pranayama, Yogic technique for controlling breath
