= Dai Wenxiong =

Chinese martial arts master

Dai Wenxiong (Chinese: 戴文雄) (1778-1873) was a Chinese martial arts master from Shanxi province. He was the teacher of Li Luoneng, the famous founder of modern-day Xingyiquan, which – along with Taijiquan and Baguazhang – constitute the Internal Arts trinity – aka Neijia arts – making Dai Wenxiong a crucial link in tracing Xingyi’s formative history. Dai Wenxiong, of the Dai clan's "Old Shanxi style", Xinyi ("Heart-Intention Fist" 心意拳), inherited the Three Fists (Drilling Fist [pinyin: Zuān Quán 鑽拳], Wrapping Fist [Pinyin: Guǒ Quán 裹拳], and Scissor Fist [Pinyin: Jiǎn Quán 剪拳]), which formed the core of his family's style - and - the Ten Animals (pinyin: Shí Dà Xíng 十大形) from the Xinyi Liuhe Quan transmission through his father, Dai Longbang.

The original Ten Animals of Xinyi Liuhe Quan are: Dragon, Tiger, Monkey, Horse, Chicken, Hawk, Swallow, Snake, Eagle, and Bear. It was from this foundation that Li Luoneng expanded the Dai clan's Three Fists into the Five Elements Fists and original Ten Animals into the Twelve Animals. The Five Elements Fists and Twelve Animals forms Li Luoneng expanded through his inheritance from Dai Wenxiong form the central foundation of Xingyiquan (the term Li Luoneng coined as a variation of 'Xinyiquan', the name of the art taught by Dai Wenxiong and his family).

Due to the secrecy practiced by the Dai family in wishing to keep Xinyiquan within their clan, Dai Wenxiong was initially reluctant to teach Li Luoneng – but – after Li persevered (with the added aid of an intercession from Dai Wenxiong's mother) – Dai Wenxiong finally decided to teach Li Luoneng, which led to Li's creating one of the most famous martial arts in Chinese history. Had Dai Wenxiong never agreed to teach Li, it's likely Xingyiquan would have never come into being. Though data on Dai Wenxiong's life is relatively sparse – save the fact that his family taught Xinyi and owned a vegetable business – it is because Dai Wenxiong was the Shifu (Master) of the legendary Li Luoneng that his name and contribution to Xingyiquan’s formation should receive recognition.

Dai Wenxiong's courtesy name was Xiaozi Erlu (小子二闾). He was a fourth-generation heir of Xinyi Liuhe Quan (心意六合拳; "The Heart-Intention-Six-Harmonies Fist"), and a second-generation heir of Dai Clan Xinyiquan (戴氏心意拳 "The Dai Shi Heart-Intention Fist"). Xinyi Liuhe Quan was refined into Xinyi by Dai clan martial arts progenitor, Dai Longbang (戴龍邦). Dai Wenxiong was from Xiaohan Village, Qixian county, Shanxi Province, and Dai Longbang's second son (though some sources state Dai Wenxiong was Dai Longbang's nephew through his brother, Dai Linbang 戴林邦).

Born in the 43rd year of the reign of the Qianlong Emperor 乾隆帝 (Qing Dynasty 清朝), Dai Wenxiong died at age 96, twelve years after the Tongzhi Emperor's ascension to the Dragon Throne 龍椅 as the Qing Dynasty’s 10th monarch. Despite his significance in Xingyiquan’s development as the teacher of Li Luoneng, Dai Wenxiong’s name is often excluded (or only mentioned) in sources that expound on Xingyi’s history. The reason for this is uncertain.

According to tenth-generation Xingyi Master, Lu Shengli (魯胜利), the reason Dai Wenxiong’s father, Dai Longbang, is often listed as Li Luoneng’s teacher (rather than Dai Wenxiong) may be due to the secrecy practiced by the Dai clan in wishing to keep their Art within the family only. In his treatise on the history and development of Xingyiquan, Lu Shengli stated: "...Dai Wenxiong put Li [Luoneng] under his father's name because, according to Chinese tradition, he had to obey his father's injunction not to teach and so would not want to be officially listed as Li's teacher. This, of course, is only conjecture; the truth of what really happened will probably never be known."
