= Cao Jiwu =

Martial artist

曹繼武 Cao Jiwu
- Born: 1662; Shanxi, China
- Died: 1698 (aged 35–36); 1722 (aged 59–60); China
- Style: Neijia; Xinyiquan
- Teacher(s): Ji Jike

Other information
- Notable students: Dai Longbang; Dai Linbang

Cao Ji Wu (Chinese: 曹繼武), (1662-1722), was a Chinese master of the internal martial art of Xinyi (Heart and Intention Boxing), precursor of Xingyi (Form and Intention Boxing). According to accepted theory, he is probably the second lineage holder of the art. Other, less credible, theories consider Bodhidharma or Yue Fei as the originators of the style.

Cao Ji Wu is said to have studied with Ji Jike for twelve years, gaining great martial prowess. In 1693, during the reign of the Kangxi Emperor, of the Manchu-led Qing Dynasty, Cao Ji Wu passed the highest level military examinations, gaining the highest score of all the candidates, and was personally appointed by the emperor as head superintendent of one of the counties in Shaanxi Province. He is said to have died of hypothermia at the age of 36, while directing troops in the relief effort after the flooding of the Han River in Shaanxi. While other versions mentioned of him returning later in life to continue teaching.

It is said that he taught the Dai brothers Dai Long Bang and Dai Linbang, who became the first generation of the Shanxi branch of Xingyi practitioners. Ji Jike had another outstanding disciple called Ma Xueli.

But the latest historical research showed evidences that Dai longbang hasn't been taught by Cao himself, neither that he had a brother named Dai lingbang who was versed in the martial art study. Dai family xinyiquan (Daishi xinyiquan) was probably created on the basis of Li zheng's teaching, who inherited himself his boxing from Cao jiwu and Ma xueli through Zhang zhicheng. In 1750, Dai Long Bang, wrote “The Six Harmonies Fist preface” in which it is said that “Ji Jike, also known as Ji Long Feng, born at the end of the Ming Dynasty, discovered the text of Yue Fei, and taught Cao Ji Wu in Qiu Pu”.].
