= The Secret of the Golden Flower =

Classic taoist text

The Secret of the Golden Flower (Chinese: 太乙金華宗旨; pinyin: Tàiyǐ Jīnhuá Zōngzhǐ) is a Chinese Taoist traditional medical textbook on neidan (inner alchemy) meditation, which also mixes Buddhist teachings with some Confucian thoughts. It was written by means of the spirit-writing (fuji) technique, through two groups, in 1688 and 1692. After publication of the translation by Richard Wilhelm, with commentary by Carl Gustav Jung, it became modernly popularized among Westerners as a Chinese "religious classic", and is read in psychological circles for analytical and transpersonal psychology considerations of Taoist meditations, although it received little attention in the East.

== History ==
=== Origins ===
Studies by Monica Esposito and Mori Yuria, provide documentary evidence that the book was produced by the spirit-writing (fuji) groups of two altars devoted to the deified Lü Dongbin: Bailong jingshe ("Pure Assembly of the White Dragon", 白龍精舍), and a branch of Gu hongmei ge ("Old Red Plum Hall", 古紅梅閣) in Piling. Members of both refer to as belonging to the school of Pure Brightness (Jingming dao, 淨明道), associated with the cult of the immortal Xu Xun. Previously, Chung-Yuan Chang had also studied the origin of the text as having been received through the "flying spirit pencil", as he stated in the 1956 Eranos lectures. The Secret of the Golden Flower became one of the best-known Taoist texts in the West as a widespread Chinese religious classic, following Richard Wilhelm's translation with commentary by Carl Gustav Jung, but receives little attention by Eastern scholars.

At the beginning of the Qing dynasty, there were followers of Xu Xun who received texts on contemplative alchemical practices (internal alchemy) and self-cultivation through spirit writing. The Secret of the Golden Flower was initially received incompletely in a first group in 1688; it remained unfinished when seven of its recipients died. In 1692, it was continued by the other group. It is claimed that the teachings of Xu Xun were transmitted by intermediate spirits, such as Lü Dongbin, Qiu Chuji and Chuduan. As Xu Xun's writings had disappeared for generations, the text was considered by Pure Brightness members to require the founding of a new Taoist sect, which was called the "Ritual Lineage of Great Oneness". Pan Yi'an (彭伊安), one of the recipients of the work, describes the initial composition process of its first part:

"As I remember, it was in the wushen year [1668] that our holy patriarch Chunyang [i.e., Lü] began to transmit the 'Instructions.' The seven people who made a commitment to him bowed deeply and obtained [his teachings]. None but these seven received this transmission. The most profound teaching was [expressed in] no more than one or two words. It could not be put into words and letters. Afterwards, the seven questioned the Patriarch in detail. As our holy patriarch spared no mercy in giving clarifications, [his teachings were] compiled for days and months. Eventually they composed a volume."

There are six different remaining editions of the text, and it was fundamental to several lineages of Taoism. It became a central doctrinal scripture of the Longmen school canon through popularization by Min Yide (1758–1836), who attributed to its importance as a "blueprint for healing of the world".

=== Wilhelm's speculations ===
Richard Wilhelm, while a missionary in China, obtained a reprinted copy in Beijing in the 1920s from members said to be an "esoteric group". According to Wilhelm, the Chinese publisher (Zhanran Huizhenzi) relied on an incomplete 17th-century version of a woodblock he had discovered in a bookstore, which he later completed with a friend's book. The Beijing bookseller only printed a few thousand copies of the work for a select audience, which included Wilhelm. Wilhelm translated the text into German in 1929, which was read by his friend Carl Gustav Jung. The English version, translated from the German by Cary Baynes, was published in 1931 with comments by Jung.

Richard Wilhelm had raised the hypothesis (now considered erroneous due to newer academic researches, as seen above) that the text expounded an orally transmitted philosophy found in early esoteric circles of China in the eighth century during the Tang dynasty. According to him, the arrival of Nestorian Christianity to China in 635 AD in the Tang dynasty and its persecution by Confucius Sects in 840 AD supported the notion that the Secret of the Golden flower could very well be encrypted Christian teachings used by the Chinese Nestorian Priests of the Luminous Religion (Chin-tan-Chiao). "Chin-Tan-Chaio" when translated can be read as the Religion of the Golden Elixir of Life which was also called the Luminous religion whose practices and philosophies were included in the Secret of the Golden Flower. According to him, the arrival of a Nestorian Christian Bishop in 635 AD and the incorporation of Eastern Christianity into China by Emperor Taizong of Tang caused the establishment of the so-called Luminous Religion in China in 635 AD. The priests of which after facing persecution in 840 AD by Emperor Wuzong of Tang, were supposedly forced to encrypt their teachings and hide them in caves. Richard Wilhelm elaborates on these speculations:

"Perhaps it will strike many a European Reader as remarkable that appear in the texts sayings familiar to him from Christian teachings. While on the other hand these same well known things which in Europe are often taken as Ecclesiastical phrasing are here given quite a different perspective. Because of the psychological connection in which they are used..." (Page 8 of the Secret of the Golden Flower)

"In T'ang period the religion of a Turkic tribe, the Uigurs, who were allied with the Emperor, was the Nestorian branch of Christianity; it stood in high favor, as is witnessed by the well-known Nestorian monument in Sianfu erected in 781, and bearing both a Chinese and a Syriac inscription. Thus connections between the Nestorians and Chin-tan-chaio are quite possible..." (Page 9 of the Secret of the Golden Flower)

"Timothy Richard went so far as to consider the Chin-tan-chiao simply a survival of the old Nestorians. He was led to his view by certain agreement in ritual and certain traditions of the Chin-tan-Chiao membership which approach closely to Christian practice..."

Wilhelm suggested that the alleged author of the book, Lü Dongbin, who was previously referred to as Lü Yen, could have been of the Nestorian Christian Faith.

== Methods ==
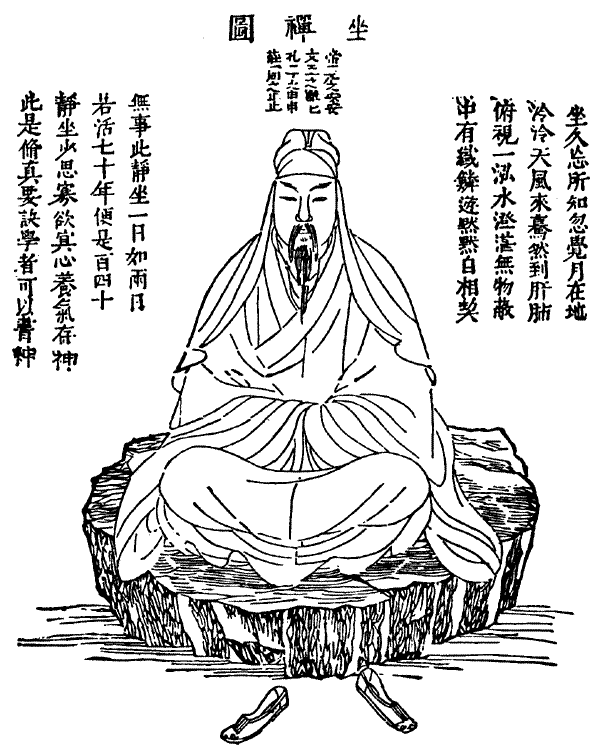
First stage of meditation

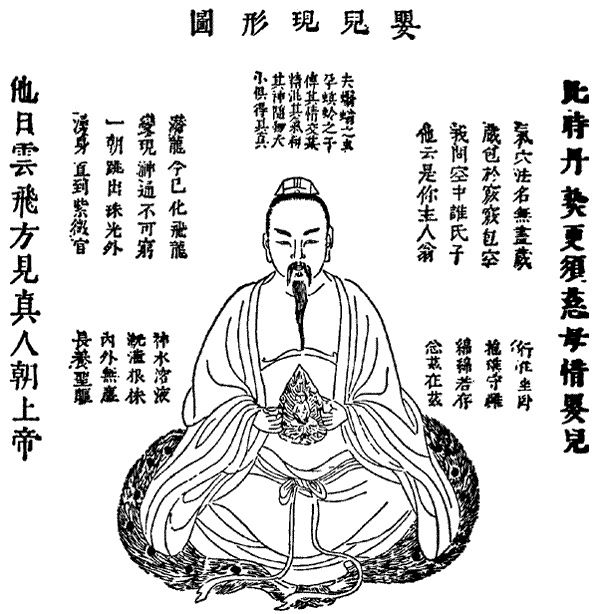
Second stage of meditation

Despite the varieties of impressions, interpretations and opinions expressed by translators, the meditation technique described by The Secret of the Golden Flower is a straightforward, silent method; the book's description of meditation has been characterized as " Chan with details". The meditation technique, set forth in poetic language, reduces to a formula of sitting, breathing, and contemplating.

Christopher Cott and Adam Rock describe it in the context of Taoist doctrine. The practice involves meditative exercises on the spiritual soul (hun) and the primordial spirit. In contrast to the material soul (po), the spirit soul resides in the heavenly heart-mind (xin) and is the Yang qi obtained from the cosmos. It is described as a house where "the light" is the master, being the stage for the "turning the light around". The procedure consists in refining the material soul and interrupting conceptual thought (of the world of the senses) through this meditation; the connection of one's authentic inherent nature, xingguang (性光) and the primordial spirit is revealed and realised. Practitioners should be aware of states such as "submersion in darkness" (cessation of conceptual thinking). They summarize the work in three stages: the initial stage is "harmonizing the breath", in which the conceptual mind still predominates, but the breath in the heart-mind and the heart-mind in the breath are used to calm this awareness. A second stage involves energetic and mental aspects (a metaphor of the interaction between Water and Fire). The third stage ("turning the light around") is finalized by the culmination of mental quiescence, the spirit incubating in qi ("Heaven entering Earth").

Sitting primarily relates to a straight posture. Breathing is described in detail, primarily in terms of the esoteric physiology of the path of qi (also known as chi or ki). The energy path associated with breathing has been described as similar to an internal wheel vertically aligned with the spine. When breathing is steady, the wheel turns forward, with breath energy rising in back and descending in front. Bad breathing habits (or bad posture, or even bad thoughts) may cause the wheel not to turn, or move backward, inhibiting the circulation of essential breath energy. In contemplation, one watches thoughts as they arise and recede.

The meditation technique is supplemented by descriptions of affirmations of progress in the course of a daily practice, suggesting stages that could be reached and phenomenon that may be observed such as a feeling of lightness, like floating upward or slight levitation. Such benefits are ascribed to improved internal energy associated with breath energy circulation, improvements that alleviate previously existing impediments. Several drawings portray imagery relevant to the personal evolution of a meditation practitioner, images that may be somewhat confusing in terms of pure rational analysis. "Only after one hundred days of consistent work, only then is the light genuine; only then can one begin to work with the spirit-fire."

The first such illustration represents the first one hundred days, or "gathering the light". The second one represents an emergence of meditative consciousness. The third stage represents a meditative awareness that exists even in mundane, daily life. Stage four represents a higher meditative perception, where all conditions are recognized. Then, varied conditions are portrayed as separately perceived, yet each separate perception is part of a whole of awareness.

== Translations ==
The Secret of the Golden Flower was first translated into German by sinologist Richard Wilhelm, a friend of Carl Jung, who had been introduced to the work by his Chinese teacher. The work was later translated from German to English by Cary F. Baynes. Jung provided comments to both of Wilhelm's major Chinese translations, including (in 1949) the nineteen-page (pp. xxi–xxxix) foreword to the Wilhelm/Baynes translation of the I Ching, discussing the transpersonal aspect, and The commentary on The secret of the golden flower (1929).

The version that Wilhelm used for his German translation had eight chapters. According to Catherine Despeux and Livia Kohn, this edition was that of a "Supplement to the Taoist Canon" from 1834. Thomas Cleary (1991) used a different 13-chapter version, which he translated into English directly from Chinese. The five chapters missing from Wilhelm's translation are very short. According to Mori Yuria, it is possible that the prototype had 20 chapters, which would have been reduced to 13 by Shao Zhilin because they were considered redundant or less organized.

Cleary criticized the validity of Wilhelm's translation, characterizing it as incomplete and inaccurate:

Because the still-current Wilhelm/Jung/Baynes edition of this manual contains dangerous and misleading contaminations, a primary consideration was to make the contents of The Secret of the Golden Flower explicitly accessible to both lay and specialist audiences.

According to Cleary:

Although Jung credited The Secret of the Golden Flower with having clarified his own work on the unconscious, he maintained serious reservations about the practice taught in the book. What Jung did not know was that the text he was reading in fact was a garbled translation of a truncated version of a corrupted recension of the original work.

Cleary gives some examples of the way that the text, in his view, was commonly misinterpreted by Wilhelm and Jung, and describes such an instance in the very beginning of the text:

In the first section of this text, for example, Wilhelm translates zhixu zhiling zhi shen, which means a spirit (i.e. mind) that is completely open and completely effective, as "God of Utmost Emptiness and Life." Based on this sort of translation, Jung thought that the Chinese had no idea that they were discussing psychological phenomena. He then tried to repsychologize the terminology, but since he did not quite understand it to begin with he could not but wind up with a distortion in the end.

However, Cleary's translated version did not provide enough information about its source documentation. Jing Haifeng (1999) and J. J. Clarke (2000) excused Jung for not being a Sinologist, and for his humanitarian concerns in alleviating suffering by providing psychological insights. Clarke also did not follow Cleary in considering that the translation used by Wilhelm was problematic.

In his autobiography Memories, Dreams, Reflections, Carl Jung states that he had sought a connection between Western and Eastern psychological understanding, and that for 15 years he had not found parallels in confirming the collective unconscious, until he read the German translation of The Secret of the Flower of Gold by Wilhelm. Christopher Cott and Adam Rock consider that Jung's comment left out many constructs present in The Secret of the Golden Flower. They state that there may be misinterpretations when extrapolating considerations that were not originally found in Taoist doctrine. Caifang Jeremy Zhu claims that Jung's comparison with Eastern meditation was inappropriate. He also notes that another text that was included in Wilhelm's translation, the Hui Ming Jing/Ching ("The Wisdom Book of Life"), also covered by Jung's commentary, is not Taoist: it is from a branch of Mahayana Buddhism.

== Jung on Wilhelm ==
"In Memory of Richard Wilhelm" (1930) by Carl Jung, published in 1962 as an appendix to The Secret of the Golden Flower. A Chinese Book of Life:

Wilhelm possessed the mastership which is won only by the [person] who surmounts his specialty, and so his knowledge became a concern touching all humanity... . For what else could have liberated him so completely from the narrow horizon of the European, of the missionary... so that no sooner had he encountered the secret of the Chinese soul than he perceived the treasure hidden there for us, and sacrificed his European prejudice on behalf of this rare pearl? It could only have been an all-embracing humanness, a greatness of heart that divines the whole, which enabled him to open himself without reservation to a profoundly foreign spirit, and to put at the services of this influence the manifold gifts and capacities of his mind. Reaching beyond... [to] eat its bread [and] drink its wine, and... enter into the communio spiritus, that most intimate transfusion and interpenetration which prepares for a new birth.

== See also ==
- Chinese spiritual world concepts

== Bibliography ==
- Contemporary Academic Research, page 24, Jan. 2008, written by Tingjun Wang, "Study of the Secret of Golden Flower internal alchemy practise". in Chinese Romanian Translation
