= Richard Wilhelm (sinologist) =

German sinologist, theologian and missionary (1873–1930)

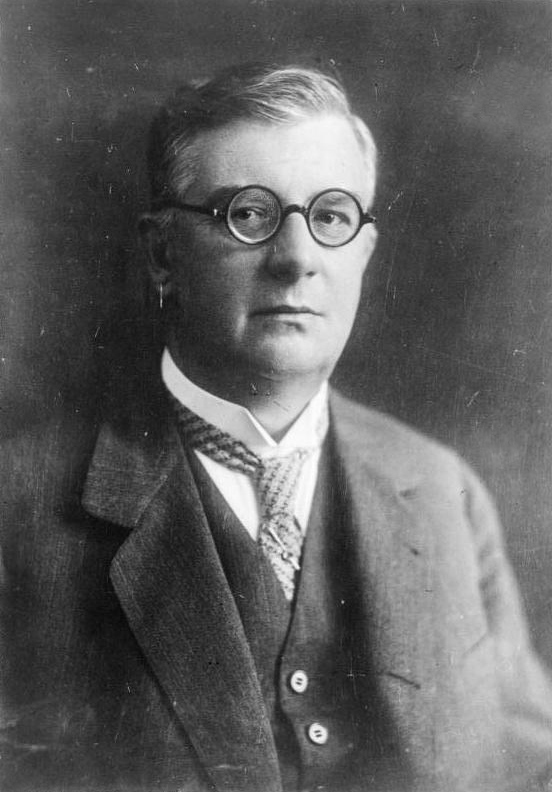
- Born: 10 May 1873; Stuttgart, German Empire
- Died: 1 March 1930 (aged 56); Tübingen, Weimar Republic
- Known for: I Ching (Yi jing) translation
- Children: Hellmut Wilhelm
- Scientific career
- Fields: Chinese literature
- Workplaces: University of Frankfurt

Chinese name
- Traditional Chinese: 衛禮賢
- Simplified Chinese: 卫礼贤
Transcriptions
Standard Mandarin
- Hanyu Pinyin: Wèi Lǐxián
- Wade–Giles: Wei^{4} Li^{3}-hsien^{2}

Richard Wilhelm (10 May 1873 – 1 March 1930) was a German sinologist, theologian and missionary. He lived in China for 25 years, became fluent in spoken and written Chinese, and grew to love and admire the Chinese people. He is best remembered for his translations of philosophical works from Chinese into German that in turn have been translated into other major languages of the world, including English. His translation of the I Ching is still regarded as one of the finest, as is his translation of The Secret of the Golden Flower; both were provided with introductions by the Swiss psychiatrist Carl Jung, who was a personal friend.

== Biography ==
After World War I, Wilhelm became disillusioned with European Christianity. Wilhelm criticized religious people for seeking strong nations, stating, "I myself believe that wealth and power is nothing that, from a religious perspective, ought to be desired, since the pursuit of wealth does not represent love, and the pursuit of power does not represent justice."

Lau Nui Suan introduced Wilhelm to Chinese yoga philosophy and the psychology of the I Ching. In Wilhelm's translation of the I Ching, he wrote that the text was "unquestionably one of the most important books in the world's literature," and that it had "a living stream of deep human wisdom" with applicability to "everyday life".

His son Hellmut Wilhelm was also a sinologist and was professor of Chinese at the University of Washington. Wilhelm was a close friend of the renowned Chinese educator and diplomat Dr. Li Linsi.

== Legacy ==
"Wilhelm was a truly religious spirit, with an unclouded and far-sighted view of things. He had the gift of being able to listen without bias to the revelations of a foreign mentality, and to accomplish that miracle of empathy which enabled him to make the intellectual treasures of China accessible to Europe...he could not help recognizing the logic and clarity of Chinese thought... it had overwhelmed him and assimilated him.

— C.G. Jung"

The Richard Wilhelm Translation Centre at Ruhr-Universität Bochum was founded in 1993 by Helmut Martin.
