= Bengquan =

Third of five dynamics or fists in the art of Xingyiquan

Bengquan (Chinese: 崩拳; pinyin: Bēngquán; Wade–Giles: Peng^{1}ch'uan^{2}) is the third of five dynamics or fists in the art of xingyiquan. Each dynamic consists of a single attack method and a turn. One normally practices four to five of the attacks, a turn, and the attacks again. Performing the five fists in this way, in sequence, is called wuxing or "Five Forms".

Translated as "crushing" or "smashing" fist, bengquan is the most straightforward of the xingyiquan dynamics, performed either as a grasp and strike or as a pair of strikes with the fist. The strikes are unified with the forward, three-step motion of the body. Two steps drive the fist forward. The third, or follow-step, brings the body into position for the next strike. The legs, which are strengthened in standing exercises, santishi, are kept bent and use the compression and release of the long muscles. The strikes or blows are driven up in a diagonal from the muscles of the rear foot, through the muscles of the torso and out the striking arm. This all combines to give bengquan a simple and straightforward power which utilises the entire body's momentum and mass.
