= Yiquan =

Chinese martial art

Yiquan 意拳
- Also known as: Dachengquan, Mind Boxing
- Focus: Striking
- Country of origin: China
- Creator: Wang Xiangzhai
- Famous practitioners: Han Xingchiao; Han Xingyuen; Shao Daosheng
- Parenthood: Baguazhang, Liuhebafa, Tai chi, Xingyiquan, Fujian White Crane, Shuai jiao
- Olympic sport: No

Yiquan
- Chinese: 意拳
- Literal meaning: "Mind Boxing"
Transcriptions
Standard Mandarin
- Hanyu Pinyin: Yìquán
- Wade–Giles: I^{4} Ch'üan^{2}

Dachengquan
- Chinese: 大成拳
- Literal meaning: "Great Achievement Boxing"
Transcriptions
Standard Mandarin
- Hanyu Pinyin: Dàchéngquán
- Wade–Giles: Ta^{4} Ch'eng^{2} Ch'üan^{2}

Yiquan (Chinese: 意拳; pinyin: yìquán), also known as dachengquan (Chinese: 大成拳; pinyin: dàchéngquán), is a Chinese martial art founded by the xingyiquan master Wang Xiangzhai. Yì (意) means "intent", while quán (拳) means "boxing."

== History ==
Having studied xingyiquan with Guo Yunshen in his childhood, Wang Xiangzhai travelled China, meeting and comparing skills with masters of various styles of kung fu. In the mid-1920s, he came to the conclusion that xingyiquan students put too much emphasis on complex patterns of movement (outer form "xing"), while he believed in the prevalent importance of the development of the mind in order to boost physical martial art skills. He started to teach what he felt was the true essence of the art using a different name, without the xing (form). Wang Xiangzhai, who had a great knowledge about the theory and history of his art, called it "yiquan" (意拳). In the 1940s one of Wang Xiangzhai's students wrote an article about his "school" and named it "dachengquan" (大成拳), which means "great achievement boxing". This name was not used by Wang Xiangzhai. Wang thought the name was a poor choice as it was boastful and not very descriptive of the intent.

In the 1930s in Shanghai, Wang's school became famous. A few of his core students were training with him at that time. Brothers Han Xingqiao and Han Xingyuan, Shao Daosheng (perhaps Wang's most accomplished student), all came together during this period. Han Xingqiao, who was formally adopted by Wang as a son and lived with him for 15 years, was studying One Finger tui na with Qian Yantang, a famous scholar and doctor. Wang Xiangzhai and Qian Yantang hit it off and studied medicine and culture together, becoming brothers in researching many mysteries. It was here that Qian introduced the idea that further exploration of zhan zhuang, a standing practice first and most foundationally taught by Wang's uncle and teacher Guo Yousheng, might be fundamental to the development of yiquan.

Wang Xiangzhai researched this idea in Qian's library, which was full of classic texts. Wang was always changing the practice and method of yiquan, always innovating, based on natural principles. Much of the development of yiquan was done in Shanghai. With the help of Han Xingqiao, Wang set the zhan zhuang in order, creating a system seven stages. Later, the basic eight postures were refined into ju, bao, peng, tui, an, hua, ti and closing with Jia So Su. These basic eight postures are still the core of zhan zhuang.

When Wang Xiangzhai (and later Han Xingqiao) moved to Beijing, Han found that Wang was only teaching three zhuang. Bao is the universal zhuang, and so Wang only really taught bao from that point on. Most of the other practices were dropped as well (for example, push hands and fa li). However, students still tried to use fa li improperly. When the students saw Wang move fast, they thought of it as fa li, or issuing force. There is actually no difference in practicing fast or slow. Wang would tell his students: "To fast movement, better a slow movement, and to slow movement, better no movement at all". There is no force at all. The misconception is caused by the mind. The mind conceives of the result as based in two different states, hard and soft, as well as fast and slow. As long as the mind clings to this dualistic model, the student will break everything into two. But the moment of experience is only one. Wang continued development of his art, but few, if any, could follow. Only those who could grasp the one state, and keep it, can move with it. Schools that were founded by students who never progressed this far are numerous to this day. This has always been the social factor of true transmission.

== The style ==
Yiquan is a martial art of internal expression. It is essentially formless, containing no fixed sets of fighting movements or techniques. Instead, focus is put on developing one's natural movement and fighting abilities through a system of training methods and concepts, working to improve the perception of one's body, its movement, and of force. Yiquan is also set apart from other eastern martial arts in that traditional concepts like qi, meridians, dantian etc., are omitted, the reason being that understanding one's true nature happens in the present, and that preconceptions block this process.

Yiquan is a distillation of the internal aspects at the core of all arts that Wang was exposed to, including Fujian White Crane, tai chi, baguazhang, and liuhebafa. Other arts as well, such as the swimming dragon posture, present in shuai jiao, is transformed through feeling, understanding, and the condition of the practitioner. In fact, typical movements and postures from other systems abound in yiquan. It was the internal core of these other arts that made them effective. This core is what Wang decoded.

=== Overview ===
The actual training in yiquan can generally be divided into:

- Zhan zhuang (Chinese: 站桩; pinyin: zhàn zhuāng) — Standing pole postures where emphasis is put on natural condition, working to improve listening to the body and on developing hunyuan li, "Natural living force" or "all things that make the whole". Once this is achieved, the practitioner moves onto zhan zhuang's six forces, which include "Up", "Down", "Forward", "Backward", "Out" and "In", with these two last ones often referred to as "Separating" and "Joining back together". Basic zhan zhuang begins with the imagining of the hugging of a tree. The idea behind this static, standing meditation is not to use strength at all, only enough to hold the position, whilst the mind is creating the intention of movement.
- Shi li (Chinese: 试力; pinyin: shìlì) — Testing force moving exercises, trying to bring the sensations of hunyuan li developed through zhan zhuang into movements. Intention or imagination comes again into play during shi li where the practitioner, in the zhan zhuang position, trains slow movements to integrate the sensation of the static meditation into a slow moving one where the mind imagines different situations within the shi li. One example of basic shi li is imagining being in the water up to one's waist or chest, pushing and then pulling a log which is floating in front of us. This slow, meditative practice aligns the body into moving all its bone and muscle structure at the same time and in one block. The imagining of the water and the log creates the perception of resistance to this movement, which the mind uses to train the muscle structure.

All of the other practices can be put into one of these two methods.

Different schools practice some degree of footwork — mocabu (Chinese: 摩擦步; pinyin: mócābù), which means "friction step" and often abbreviated as bufa (Chinese: 步法; pinyin: bùfǎ) or "stepping method" — and different movements leading towards free expression of the collected state.

Principle of Nature: All truth and action occur in shunjian, the split second of now. Everything before and after this moment is wu (the void) and thus, uncontrollable or unknowable. All objective and preconception is fixed and not in accordance with this undetermined state of Nature. "The Dao that is called the Dao is not the eternal Dao".

== Important figures and notable practitioners ==
- Wang Xiangzhai - founder of style
- Yao Zongxun (1917-1985), a native of Hangzhou County, Zhejiang Province. A famous martial artist in modern China. Writer of "Yiquan-Chinese Modern Practical Boxing."
- Han Xingyuan (1915-1983), a native of Hebei Province with the word Ruoshui, was a disciple of Wang Xiangzhai. He and his brother Han Xingqiao were both inheritors of yiquan and passed yiquan to Hong Kong.
- You Pengxi (Professor Pengsi Yu), (1902-1983), professor of medicine, famous for "Empty Force". He is disciple of Wang Xiangzhai and lived in the United States following the Cultural Revolution.
- Kenichi Sawai (1903–1988) - Japanese martial artist and associate of Mas Oyama, the founder of Kyokushin Karate. Sawai visited Beijing in 1939 to challenge Wang Xiangzhai. He made several attempts to defeat Wang, but Sawai was soundly defeated each time. Kenichi subsequently applied to study under Wang and Yao Zongxun. Kenichi subsequently returned to Japan, where he introduced a slightly modified version of yiquan which he called "Taikiken".
- Stefano Agostini (b. 1954) in 1999 published the first book on Yiquan in a European language, in Italian, entitled Kung Fu Yi Quan. In 2018 he became a direct disciple of Master Yao Chengguang, (son and direct disciple of Yao Zongxun).

== See also ==
- Xingyiquan
- Chinese martial arts
- Kung fu
