= Wang Xiangzhai =

Chinese martial artist

王薌齋 Wang Xiangzhai
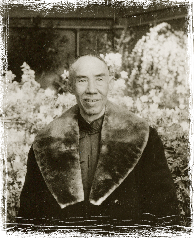
- Born: November 26, 1885; Hebei, China
- Died: July 12, 1963 (aged 77); Tianjin, China
- Other names: Nibao, Zhenghe, Yuseng
- Style: Neijia; Xingyiquan; Fujian White Crane; Liuhebafa; Cheng Style Baguazhang
- Teachers: Guo Yunshen; Heng Lin; Xie Tiefu; Fang Yizhuang; Jin Shaofeng; Wu Yihui; Zhang Zhaodong
- Rank: Founder of Yiquan

Other information
- Notable students: Yao Zongxun, Wang Shujin, Li Jianyu, Yu Pengxi, Wang Xuanjie Zhao Entong, Han Xing Chiao Han Xing Yuen

Wang Xiangzhai (simplified Chinese: 王芗斋; traditional Chinese: 王薌齋; pinyin: Wáng Xiāngzhāi; November 26, 1885 - July 12, 1963), also known as Nibao, Zhenghe and Yuseng, was a Chinese xingyiquan master, responsible for founding the martial art of Yiquan.

== Biography ==
Wang Xiangzhai was born in Hebei province, China. As he was a very weak child, his parents decided to send him to the famous Xingyiquan master Guo Yunshen to improve his health.

The Wang family had always had connections with the Guo family, horse breeders in the average. Master Guo Yunshen taught him zhanzhuang gong (post standing postures) that the young Xiangzhai had to keep standing for hours. Three times Wang left his teacher and three times he returned finding that traditional training was flawed.

During his young adult life, Wang Xiangzhai became a soldier in Beijing and at the age of 33, he went all around China, studying martial arts with many famous masters including the monk Heng Lin, Xinyiquan master Xie Tiefu, southern white crane style masters Fang Yizhuang and Jin Shaofeng, Liuhebafa master Wu Yihui, etc.

After 7 years of research and study, (with Chen Yen Tong), Wang established himself in Shanghai. It was Chen Yen Tong's suggestion to name it "Yiquan". At that time Han xing Chiao was already his student. Han was a student of Master Wu Yihui. Wang became friends with Liuhebafa master Wu Yihui who was introduced by his pupil Han xing Chiao in Shanghai, and also later became friends with the Baguazhang master Zhang Zhaodong.

He started to teach many influential martial artists including Hong Lianshun, Zhao Daoxin, the Han brothers, (Shanghai period, Han Xingqiao and Han Xingyuan), and later in Beijing Yao Zongxun, Zhang Entong, and others.

He first named his teaching Yiquan, in reference to the Xingyiquan and Xinyiquan styles. Later, in the 1940s, one of his disciples who was a journalist publicly called it Dachengquan, which means "great achievement boxing". It is known by both these names today.

He received the visit of many Japanese experts during the war. One, Kenichi Sawai was assumed to be his student and created his own school in Japan calling his martial art Taikiken. Sawaii was however solely instructed by Wang's successor Yao Zongxun, and not directly by Wang himself.

At the end of his life he performed research into the healing aspect of Zhanzhuang and worked with different hospitals.

He died in 1963 in Tianjin, from a disease.

He was one of the first Chinese teachers to publicly teach the practice of Zhanzhuang, or 'standing like a tree' methods.

In silence there must be movement, and in motion, there must be silence.
A small movement is better than a big,
no movement is better than a small
silence is all the movement's mother.
In Movement you should be like a dragon or a tiger.
In non Movement you should be like a Buddha.
--Wang Xiangzhai
