= Zhan zhuang =

Training method often practiced by students of neijia

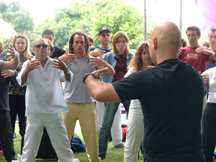
- Zhan zhuang training on the World Tai Chi and Qigong Day, Israel. The people in the picture hold the Hun Yuan posture, also known as Cheng Bao.
- Traditional Chinese: 站樁
- Simplified Chinese: 站桩
Transcriptions
Standard Mandarin
- Hanyu Pinyin: Zhàn Zhuāng

Zhan zhuang (simplified Chinese: 站桩; traditional Chinese: 站樁; pinyin: zhàn zhuāng; lit. 'standing [like a] post') is a training method often practiced by students of neijia (internal kung fu), such as yiquan, xingyiquan, baguazhang and tai chi. Zhan zhuang is sometimes translated Standing-on-stake, Standing Qigong, Standing Like a Tree, Post-standing, Pile-standing, or Pylon Standing.

== History ==
The word zhan zhuang is the modern term; it was coined by Wang Xiangzhai. Hou Shengchuan describes Dachengquan (yiquan), created by Wang Xiangzhai, as starting its martial training with zhan zhuang and shili. Yiquan's method of study is zhan zhuang plus movements that continue the feeling of the Standing Post in action.

The most common zhan zhuang method is known as Hun Yuan (浑圆; Hún Yuán, "Completely Round," "Round Smoothness") or Cheng Bao (撑抱; Chēng Bào, "Tree Hugging" stance). In xingyiquan, San Ti Shi (simplified Chinese: 三体势; traditional Chinese: 三體勢; pinyin: sān tǐ shì; lit. 'Three Body Postures') has been a root practice for centuries.

== Detail ==
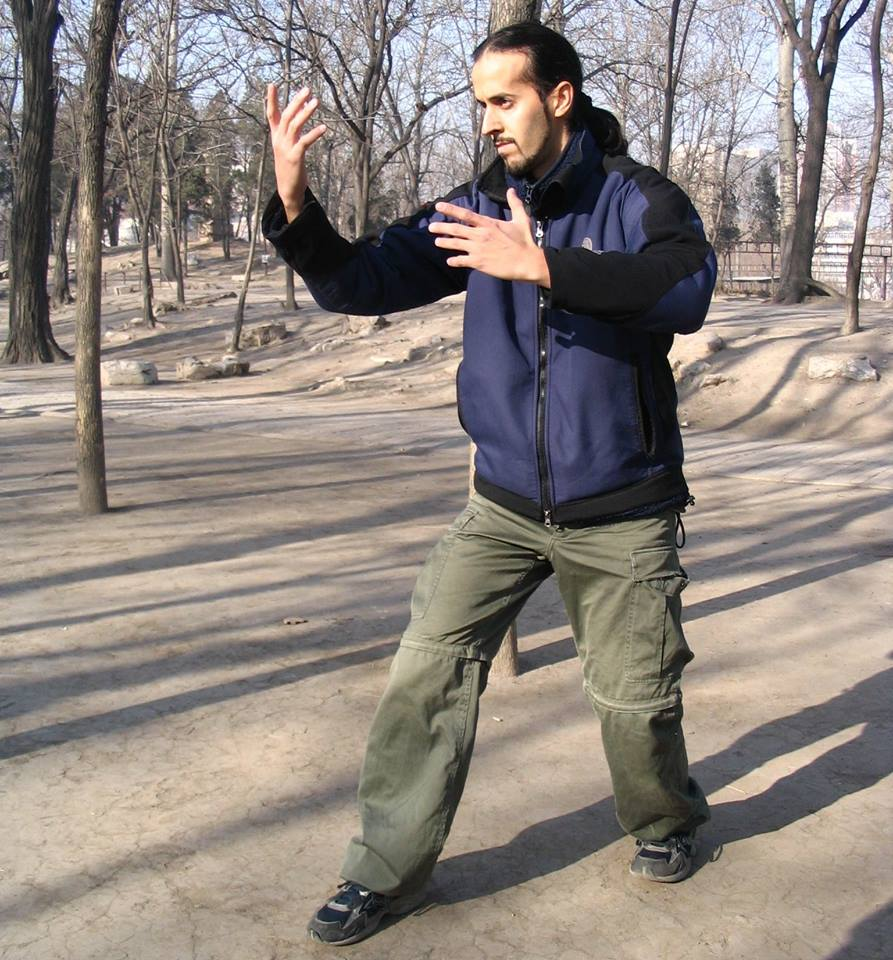
Nitzan Oren, demonstrating a zhan zhuang posture which combines the San Ti posture of xingyiquan and a Hun Yuan hand variation

Those unfamiliar with zhan zhuang can experience severe muscle fatigue and subsequent trembling at first. Later, once sufficient stamina and strength have been developed, the practitioner can use zhan zhuang to work on developing the sensation of "opposing forces," as well as one's central equilibrium and sensitivity to specific areas of tension in the body.

Zhan zhuang has a strong connection with Traditional Chinese Medicine. Some schools use the practice as a way of removing blockages in qi flow, believing zhan zhuang, when correctly practiced, has a normalizing effect on the body; they claim any habitual tension or tissue shortening (or lengthening) is normalized by the practice, and the body regains its natural ability to function optimally. It is claimed that a normalized body will be less prone to muscular-skeletal medical conditions, and it is also believed that zhan zhuang, when practiced for developing relaxed postures, will lead to a beneficial calming effect. The dantian is also involved in the practice of zhan zhuang.

The amount of time spent practicing zhan zhuang varies between styles and schools; one may spend anywhere from two minutes to two hours standing in one posture.

Many styles, especially the internal styles, combine zhan zhuang with qigong training and other coordinated-body methods to develop whole-body coordination for martial purposes. The martial practice is thought to strengthen the body's Central Nervous System and develop the coordination required for effective martial performance. In yiquan, a clear distinction is made between health postures and martially oriented postures. In baguazhang's circle-walking practice, the upper body is held as a zhan zhuang posture, while the lower body is more dynamic.

== See also ==
- Xingyiquan
- Neigong
- Neijia
- Qigong

== Books ==
- J.P.C. Moffett, Wang Xuanjie (1994), Traditional Chinese Therapeutic Exercises: Standing Pole.
- Lam Kam Chuen, Gaia Books Ltd, 1991 (2005) ISBN 1-85675-215-1, "Chi Kung: The Way of Energy".
- Lam Kam Chuen, Gaia Books Ltd, 2003 ISBN 1-85675-198-8, "The Way of Power: Reaching Full Strength in Body and Mind".
- Peter den Dekker, Back2Base Publishing BV, 2010 ISBN 978-94-90580-01-8, "The Dynamics of Standing Still"
- Professor Yu Yong Nian, Amazon (2012) "El arte de nutrir la vida. Zhang zhuang el poder de la quietud"
- Jonathan Bluestein (2014). Research of Martial Arts. Amazon CreateSpace. ISBN 978-1499122510.
- Mark Cohen, MSC Creative Enterprises, 2013, ISBN 978-0988317888, "Inside Zhan Zhuang".
