= Wudangquan =

Group of Chinese martial arts

Wudangquan (Chinese: 武當拳; pinyin: Wǔdāngquán) is a class of Chinese martial arts. In contemporary China, Chinese martial arts styles are generally classified into two major groups: Wudang (Wutang), named after the Wudang Mountains; and Shaolin, named after the Shaolin Monastery. Whereas Shaolin includes many martial art styles, Wudangquan includes only a few arts that use the focused mind to control the body. This typically encompasses tai chi, xingyiquan and baguazhang, but most also include bajiquan and Wudang Sword.

The association with Wudang originated with a popular Chinese legend in which tai chi, Wudang sword, and other internal martial arts are purported to have been created by an immortal Taoist hermit named Zhang San Feng. The terms Wudang and Shaolin were selected in the early twentieth century by the first modern Chinese martial arts historians to distinguish internal and external martial arts. However, they and later historians have found no historical connection between those broad categories and either place.

Since then, the term Wudangquan has often been used synonymously with neijia, but the term neijia encompasses all internal martial arts as well as qigong which is not a martial art.

== History ==
=== Qing China ===
The term neijia and the distinction between internal and external martial arts first appears in Huang Zongxi's 1669 Epitaph for Wang Zhengnan. Stanley Henning proposes that the Epitaph's identification of the internal martial arts with the Taoism indigenous to China and of the external martial arts with the foreign Buddhism of Shaolin—and the Manchu Qing dynasty to which Huang Zongxi was opposed—was an act of political defiance rather than one of technical classification.

In 1676 Huang Zongxi's son, Huang Baijia, who learned martial arts from Wang Zhengnan, compiled the earliest extant manual of internal martial arts, the Neijia quanfa.

In the late 1800s, Dong Haichuan began teaching baguazhang to a very select group of individuals. The highly-notable xingyiquan stylist Liu De Kuan was among those who learned this special art from Dong. Liu was a very friendly martial artist who had also learned tai chi from Yang Luchan. Liu's friendly nature and experience with the three "internal" martial arts created an easy forum for discussion and knowledge-sharing between practitioners of these arts. In 1894, an alliance was created with Cheng Tinghua representing baguazhang while Li Cunyi and Liu Weixiang represented xingyiquan; and although Liu De Kuan practiced all three arts, he represented tai chi. The alliance grouped the three arts under the umbrella of "Neijia," and swore brotherhood among its associates and practitioners. Cheng Ting Hua was shot and killed by German soldiers during the Boxer Rebellion (1900), which likely strengthened the alliance.

=== Republic of China ===
Around 1912, the third-generation bagua zhang master Fu Chen Sung was traveling throughout Northern China to meet and learn from the best martial artists when he met the Wudang Sword grandmaster Song Weiyi in Liaoning Province; Fu learned Sung's Wudang Sword and fighting forms: Lightning Palm and Rocket Fist. Fu joined General Li Jinglin's army in 1920. General Li Jinglin had also met Song Weiyi in the early 1900s while garrisoned in Liaoning Province, and had also learned Song's Wudang Sword techniques.

In 1925, General Zhang Zhijiang began to propagate his belief that martial arts should be used to improve the health of the Chinese people. He suggested the creation of a Central Martial Arts Academy (Central Guoshu Institute), and was named Director. General Li Jinglin, retired from his military career, was named Vice-Chairman to the Academy. General Li's kung fu advisor was the famous bajiquan master Li Shuwen.

In 1928, the Kuomintang generals Zhang Zijiang, Fung Zu Ziang and Li Jinglin organized two national martial arts tournaments in Beijing and Nanjing; they did so to screen the best martial artists in order to begin populating the Central Martial Arts Academy. The generals separated the participants of the tournament into Shaolin and Wudang. Wudang participants were recognized as having "internal" skills. These participants were generally practitioners of tai chi, xingyiquan and baguazhang. All other participants competed under the classification of Shaolin. Thus, Wudangquan came to encompass tai chi, baguazhang, xingyiquan; bajiquan after Li Shuwen; and Wudang Sword after Song Weiyi and Li Jinglin. Fu Zhensong won the fighting competition in Beijing, and was named head baguazhang instructor of all China. Circumspectively, this seems to be the historical point when the name Wudang became the prevalent term for the internal martial arts across China.

The two major lineages of Wudangquan were passed down from Li Jinglin to Fu Zhensong and Yang Guishan.

== Fu-style Wudangquan ==
Fu Zhensong worked the rest of his life to develop Fu-style Wudangquan. The system included exercises, empty hand and weapons sets in tai chi, baguazhang, xingyiquan—and Fu Zhensong's well-documented, signature forms: liangyiquan, Dragon Palm baguazhang and Dragon Palm bagua push hands (most of which he created in the 1940s); the famous but extremely rare Wudang Sword techniques were embodied in Fu's progression of Taiji Sword, to Seven Star Sword, to Bagua Cyclone Broadsword, and finally, Flying Dragon Bagua Sword forms. In his lifetime, Fu had many notable students, including General Sun Pao Gung and Lin Chao Zhen. Fu's oldest son, Fu Yonghui, became Fu's protégé. Yonghui grew up among many of the greatest martial artists in the Golden Era of Martial Arts in China. Yonghui learned well from his father and the other great masters. He practiced hard, and began developing Fu-style Wudangquan even more. Yonghui had two top students: his son, (Victor) Fu Shenglong, and Bow Sim Mark (the mother and teacher of Donnie Yen).

== Wudang Danpai ==
According to T'ai Chi Magazine, volume 29, no. 3, Wudang Dan Pai claims direct descent of Zhang Sanfeng. Starting in the Ming Dynasty with Zhang Songxi, Wudang Danpai has been passed down for 13 generations. Its 9th generation lineage holder was Song Weiyi, who was the first non-Taoist to hold the lineage. Song passed the lineage to Li Jinglin (for the 10th). Li passed the lineage to Yang Guishang (for the 11th), who passed it on to Qian Timing (for the 12th). The 12th generation headmaster and Gatekeeper of Wudang Danpai in China was Ma Jie, who learned his techniques from Daoist master Xuan Dan, Wudang Sword master Meng Xiaofeng, and xingyiquan and baguazhang master Han Muxia. Ma Jie's closed door disciples, Chang Wuna and Lu Meihui (who are also disciples of Qian Timing) are the current masters and gatekeepers of the 13th generation.

At the time Li Jinglin held the lineage, Li and his contingent were learning baguazhang from Fu Zhensong; xingyiquan from Sun Lutang; tai chi from Yang Chengfu; bajiquan from Li Shuwen; and the Wudang Sword techniques had come from Song Weiyi.

Techniques include: Wudang Sword (6 sections 132 movements), Wudang qigong tai chi, Wudang neigong tai chi, Wudang Two-Man Sword Dueling Forms, Wudang Flying Sword, xingyiquan, baguazhang, Dian Xue Point Striking, Taiji Push Hands, Wudang Sword Sparring, Taoist Nei Dan Gong, and other meditation practices. The push hands features a combination of Chinese Wrestling and joint locking. In traditional Wudang and taijijian swordplay, practitioners train with an unsharpened, semi-flexible steel jian featuring a raised central ridge (jianji, 剑脊), Taoist liangyi or bagua guard motifs, an un-scabbarded weight of 590–630 g (1.30–1.39 lb) balanced 6.0–9.0 cm (2.4–3.5 in) ahead of the guard, and a solid hardwood scabbard (such as jichi wood) to cultivate blade-tip sensitivity (tingjin) and internal power (fa jin).

The system is known for its emphasis on practical applications, and its fighting and healing abilities, with many of its masters entering full contact competitions or becoming traditional healers. Equal emphasis is placed on internal training and external strength.

== Wudang Taiyi Boxing ==
According to T'ai Chi Magazine, volume 30, no. 1, Yang Qunli claims Jin Zitao started learning Wudang Taiyi Wuxing Boxing from Li Heling at Wudang Mountain in 1929. The article connotes that from the time of Li's death until the early 1980s, Jin Zitao was the only person alive who had knowledge of the secret martial arts of Wudang Mountain. In 1980, Jin Zitao demonstrated Wudang Taiyi Wuxing Boxing to the National Wushu Viewing and Emulating and Communicating Congress in Taiyuan City, Shanxi Province. Before that, it had "never been shown before."

The article cites Jin's association with "The Institute of Wudang Boxing" and the "Journal of Wudang."

According to Kung Fu Tai Chi Magazine, Zhong Yunlong went to Wudang Mountain in 1984, and studied under the 13th generation masters, Guo Gaoyi and Wang Kuangde. Zhong became the 14th generation lineage holder of the Wudang Sanfeng Sect. The article cites their association with the 'Wudang Taoist Association."

There does not seem to be any connection between Jin Zitao and the Wudang Sanfeng Sect except for the fact that they both use the term "Taiyi" as the name of a form. Both lineages claim to be direct descendants of Zhang Sanfeng, and claim they learned Wudang martial arts at Wudang Mountain in the 20th century.

Currently, a contingent of Taoist martial art masters claiming lineage to Zhong Yunlong practice and teach Wudang martial arts at Wudang Mountain, which was named a World Heritage Site by the United Nations Educational Scientific Cultural Organization (UNESCO) in 1994. These Taoists practice what they call Wudang Wushu or Wudang Gongfu, and worship Zhang Sanfeng as a deity. The website shows a curriculum of tai chi, xingyiquan, baguazhang, qigong, meditation, and liangyi (taiyi wuxingquan), and claims baguazhang originated there. These masters and the Fu Family are the only two schools that teach a martial art form called Liangyi.

== Xuanwu Pai ==
The Wudang Xuanwu Pai was officially formed in 1989 as an association of various Daoists in the Wudang mountains who have Xuanwu as their patron deity and claim lineage from the temples founded by the Yongle Emperor in the Ming dynasty. Arts taught include tai chi, xingyiquan, taiyi, and baguazhang. Prominent teachers include You Xuande (14th generation lineage holder and current Grandmaster), Yuan Limin (15th generation), Chen Lisheng (15th generation), and Tang Lilong (15th generation). Xuanwu Pai teachings have been spread outside China by teachers such as Ismet Himmet (You Lihan), Gordon Faulkner (You Lisu), Tina Faulkner Elders (Chen Weiying), and Lucia Ring-Watkins (Yuan Weirong).

== Sanfeng Pai ==
This lineage was transmitted to master Zhong Yunlong through the 13th generation leader, Wang Guangde (1947–2001), who became the head of Wudang mountain after religious practice was legalized in 1979. Master Wang had studied under Longmen Pai master Li Chengyu (1885–2003) and Xiao Yaowan (1911–1997), the 12th generation head of Wudang Sanfeng Pai, from whom master Wang received the lineage.

Since the end of the Cultural Revolution in 1976, China began to open up to the world. Subsequently, there was a slow trickle of Daoists returning to Wudang. Most importantly, Guo Gaoyi (1900–1996) and Zhu Chengde (1898–1990), both Longmen Pai masters returned in 1980. In 1981, Zhong Yunlong came to Wudang to study internal martial arts and became a disciple of masters Wang Guangde, Guo Gaoyi and Zhu Chengde, studying Sanfeng Pai and Longmen Pai practices under them. In 1985, master Wang, then the head of the Wudang Daoist Association put out a call for Taoists scattered by the cultural revolution to return to Wudang. Simultaneously, he sent master Zhong Yunlong all around China with letters of introduction with the goal of assisting Taoist masters to pass on their teachings to his disciple. Through his travels and training, master Zhong amassed a huge body of knowledge ranging from Daoist martial arts to inner alchemy and healing practices. After four years of traveling he came back to Wudang in 1989 and together with master Wang Guangde, founded the Daoist Association Martial Arts Academy at Purple Cloud Temple, with master Guo Gaoyi serving as the head martial arts instructor and master Zhu Chengde as the head qigong master.

Grandmaster Zhong Yunlong, who represents the 14th generation of Wudang Sanfeng Pai, had his first disciples in the early 90’s. The most renowned were master Yuang Xiugang and master Zhong Xuechao, who at the same time were his very first students, who represent the first 15th generation masters of Wudang Sanfeng Pai lineage holders.

Since then, master Yuan Xiugang has been the first to open discipleship ceremonies to non-Chinese students, under the recommendation of his master Zhong Yunlong, to continue the spread of these ancestral arts to the rest of the world. The main disciples that are following the spreading of this teachings in the western world are master Zi Xiao (Alex Mieza), Zi He (Jeff Reid) and Zi Gen (Jake Pinnick), representing the first western disciples of the 16th generation of Wudang Sanfeng Pai.

== See also ==
- Qi
- Dantian
- Neidan
- Tao Te Ching
- Jian
- Taijijian
- Temple of the Five Immortals
- Taoist schools
- Wudang Sect

== Sources ==
- "The Wu Dang Sword" Black Belt Magazine (March 1990)"
- Pa Kwa Chang Journal (volume 1, #3; volume 2, #6; volume 5, #2; and volume 6, #6)
- Fu Style Dragon Form Eight Trigrams Palms by Fu Wing Fay and Lai Zonghong (translated by Joseph Crandall); Copyright, 1998, Smiling Tiger Martial Arts
