= Fashi Zhenwu Temple =

- 法石真武庙
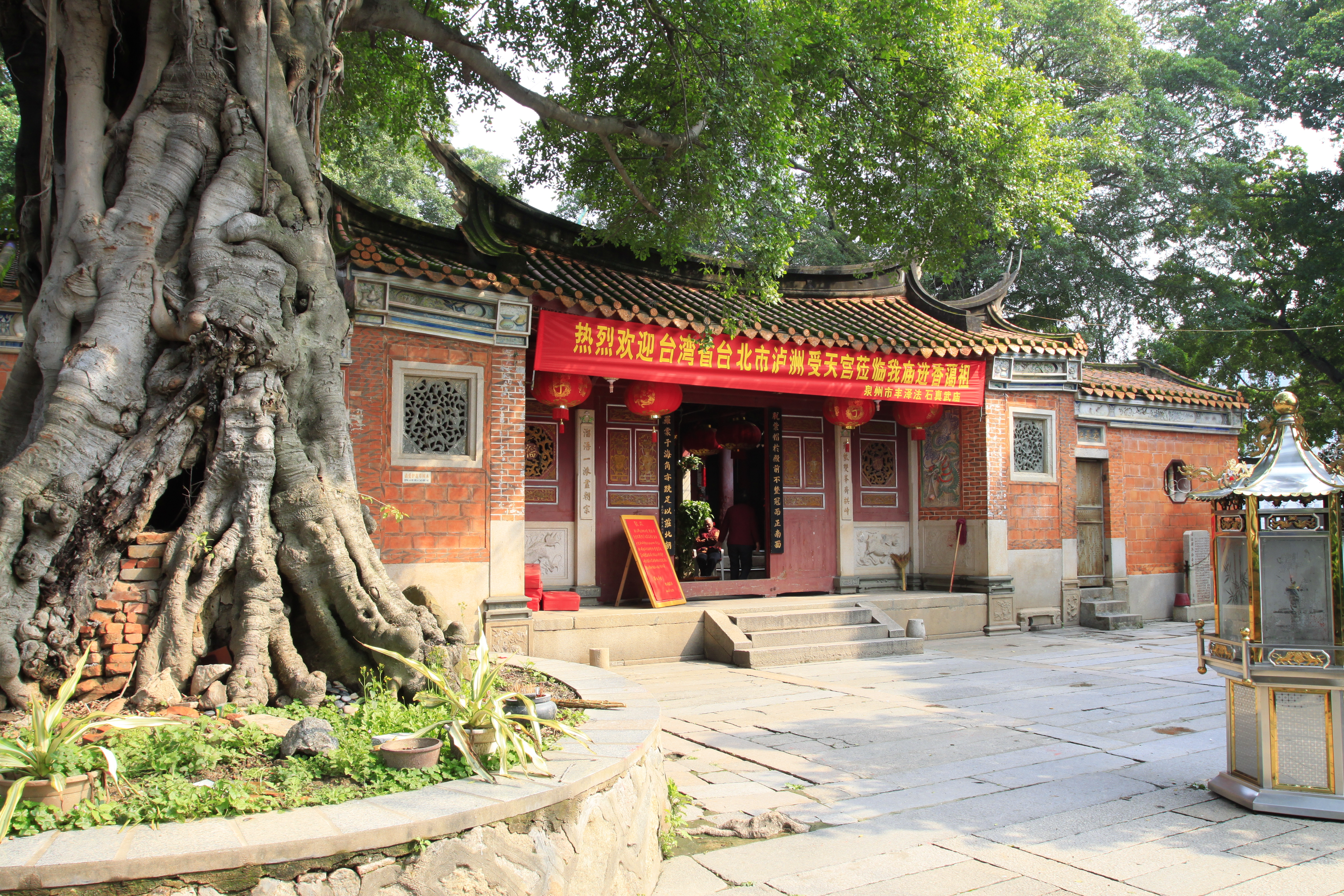
- Entrance of Fashi Zhenwu Temple.

- Location within Fujian

Religion
- Affiliation: Taoism
- Deity: Xuanwu

Location
- Location: Fengze District, Quanzhou, Fujian
- Country: China
- Interactive map of Fashi Zhenwu Temple
- Coordinates: 24°52′57″N 118°37′00.12″E

Architecture
- Style: Chinese architecture
- Established: Song dynasty

UNESCO World Heritage Site
- Location: China
- Part of: Quanzhou: Emporium of the World in Song-Yuan China
- Criteria: Cultural: (iv)
- Reference: 1561
- Inscription: 2021 (44th Session)

Fashi Zhenwu Temple (simplified Chinese: 法石真武庙; traditional Chinese: 法石真武廟; pinyin: Fǎshí Zhēnwǔ Miào) is a Taoist temple located in Fengze District of Quanzhou, Fujian, China. In 2021, the temple was inscribed on the UNESCO World Heritage List along with other medieval sites in Quanzhou because of its religious importance for maritime trade in China during the Song and Yuan dynasties and its testimony to the global exchange of ideas and cultures.

== History ==
According to Quanzhou Prefecture Topography (泉州府志) and Jinjiang County Annals (晋江县志), the temple was originally built in the Song dynasty (960–1279). Another says that the temple was first built in the Southern Tang dynasty (923–936).

== Architecture ==
Now the existing main buildings include Shanmen, Bai Pavilion (拜亭) and Zhenwu Hall (真武殿).

=== Bai Pavilion ===
The Bai Pavilion was rebuilt in 1870, during the reign of Tongzhi Emperor in the Qing dynasty (1644–1911).

=== Zhenwu Hall ===
Covering an area of 780-square-metre (8,400 sq ft), the Zhenwu Hall was reconstructed in 1842 with single-eave gable and hip roof, in the ruling of Daoguang Emperor in the Qing dynasty (1644–1911). It is the main hall in the temple for worshiping Xuanwu. A modern restoration of the hall was carried out in 1985.

== Gallery ==
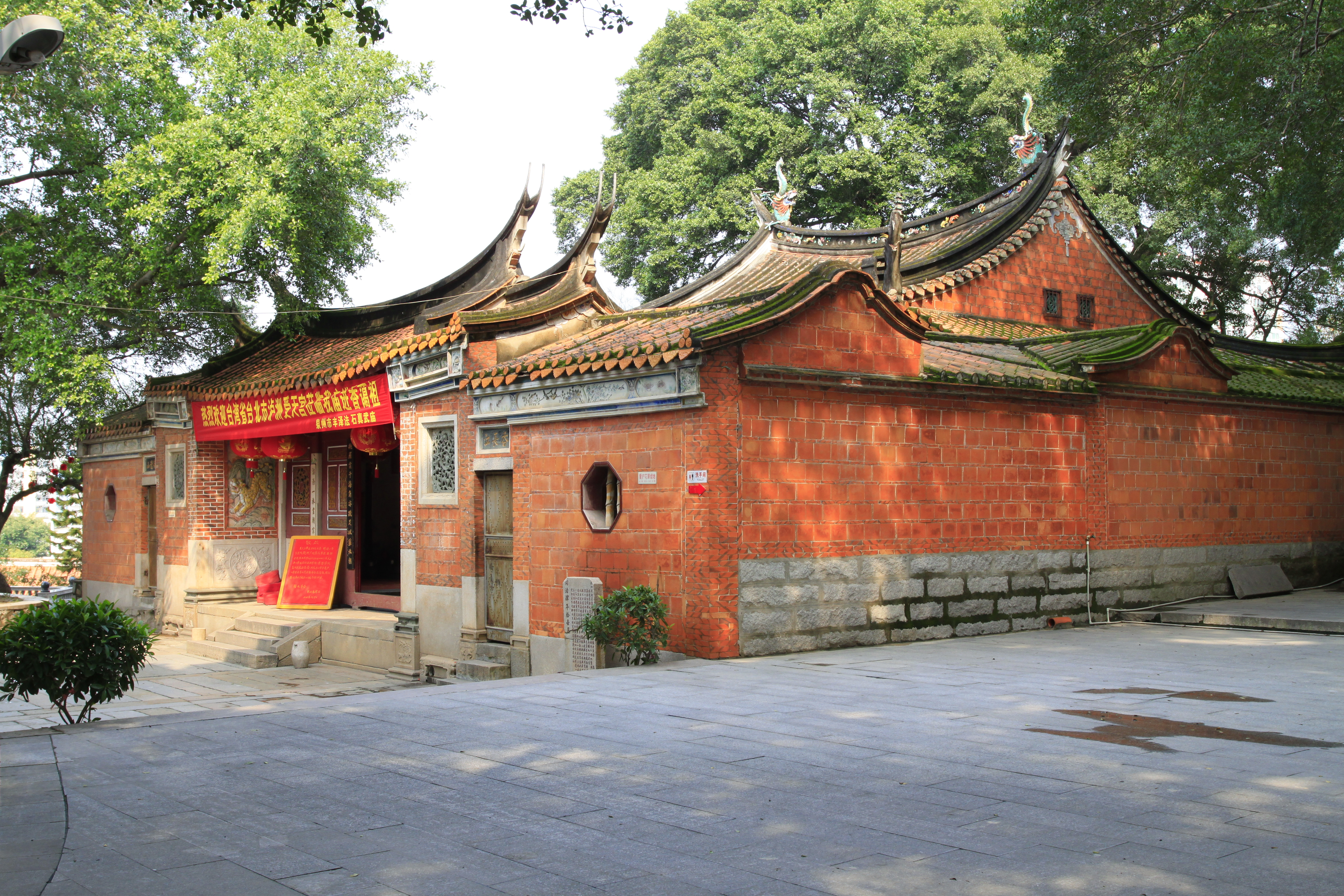
A side view of Fashi Zhenwu Temple.

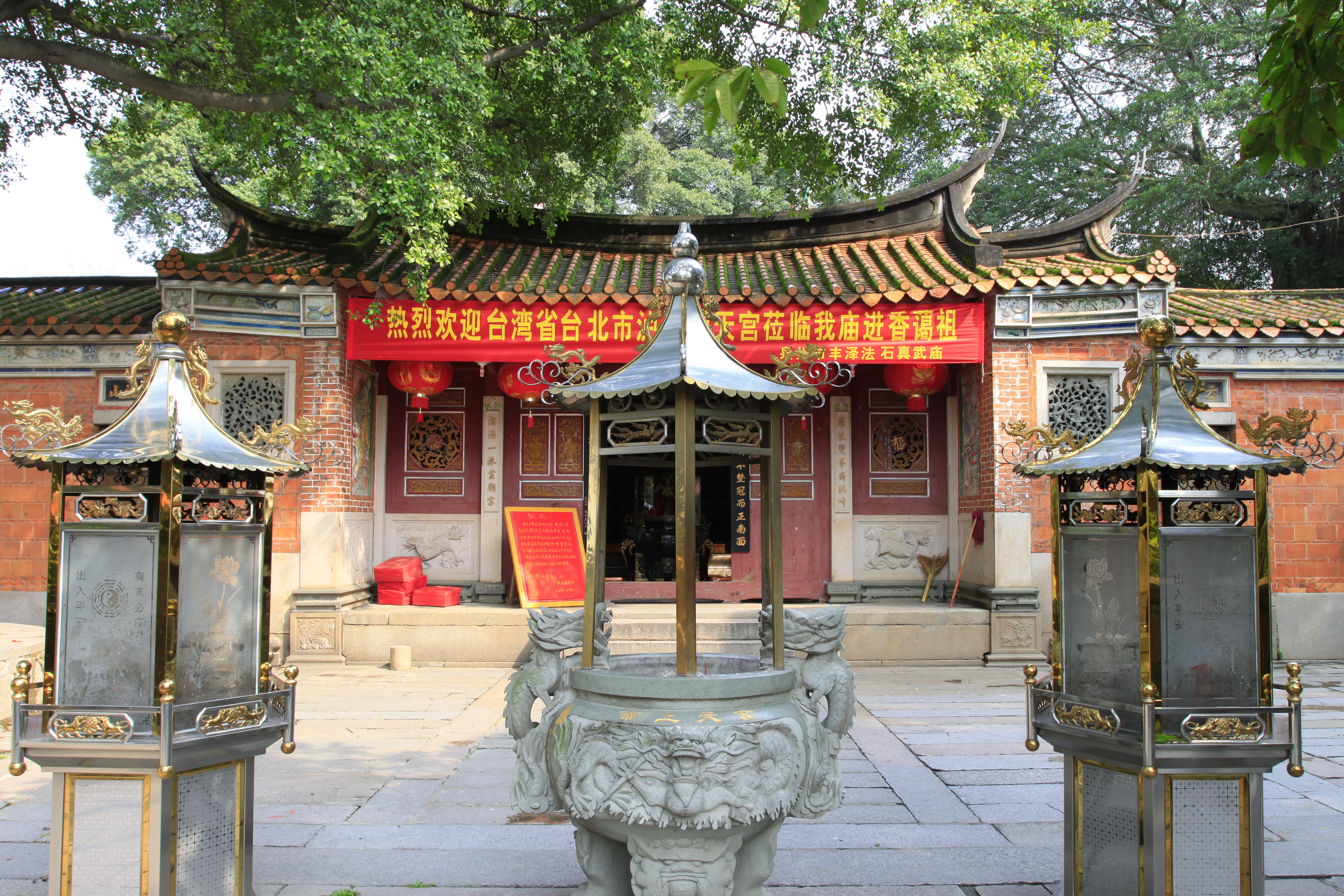
Entrance.

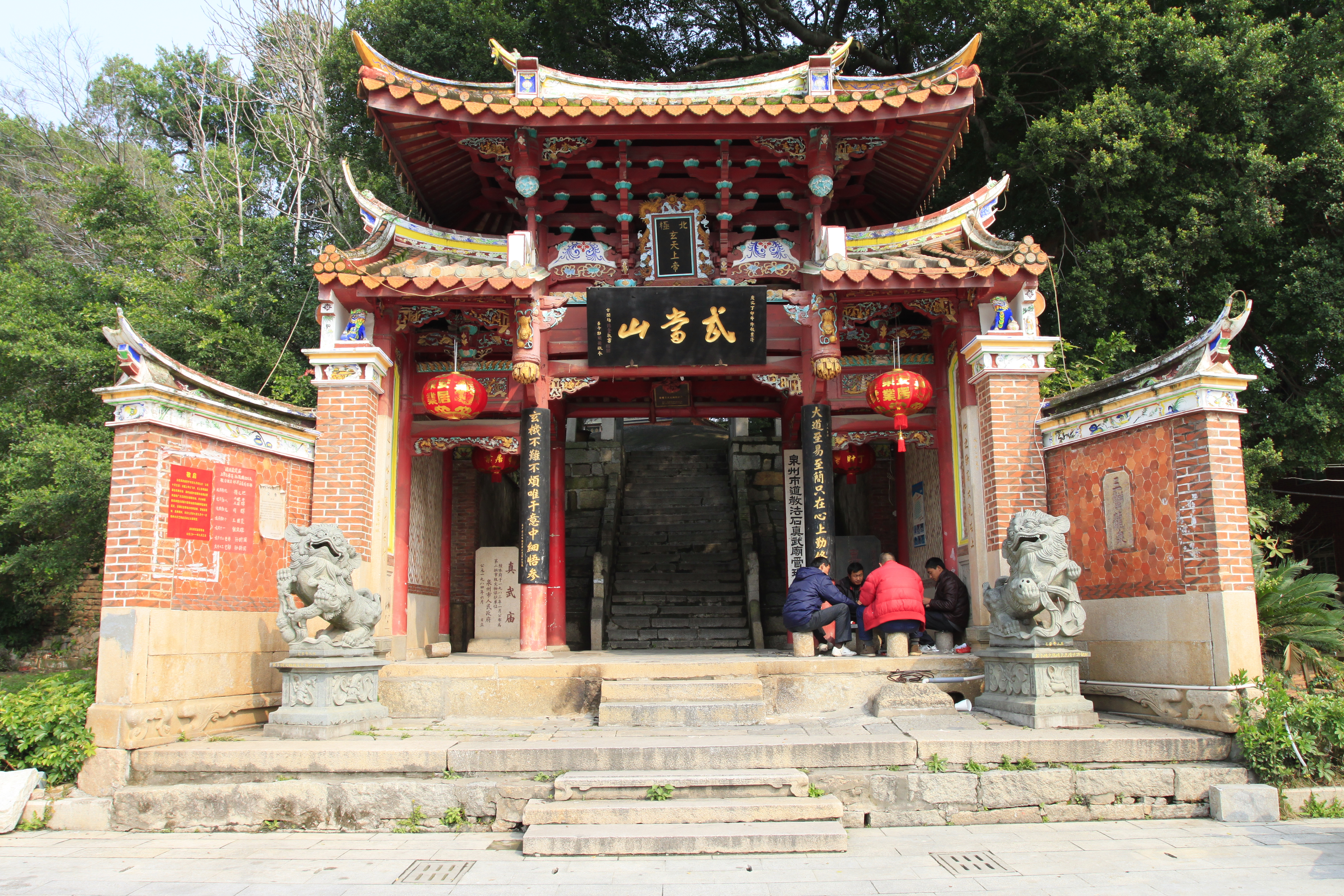
Shanmen.
