= Nanyan =

Nanyan may refer to:

- Nanyan, Iran, a village in Gilan Province
- Huang Nanyan (b. 1977), Chinese badminton player
- Nanyan Temple, temple in China
