= Alex Mieza =

Wudang Taoist official lineage holder

Alex Mieza (Taoist master)
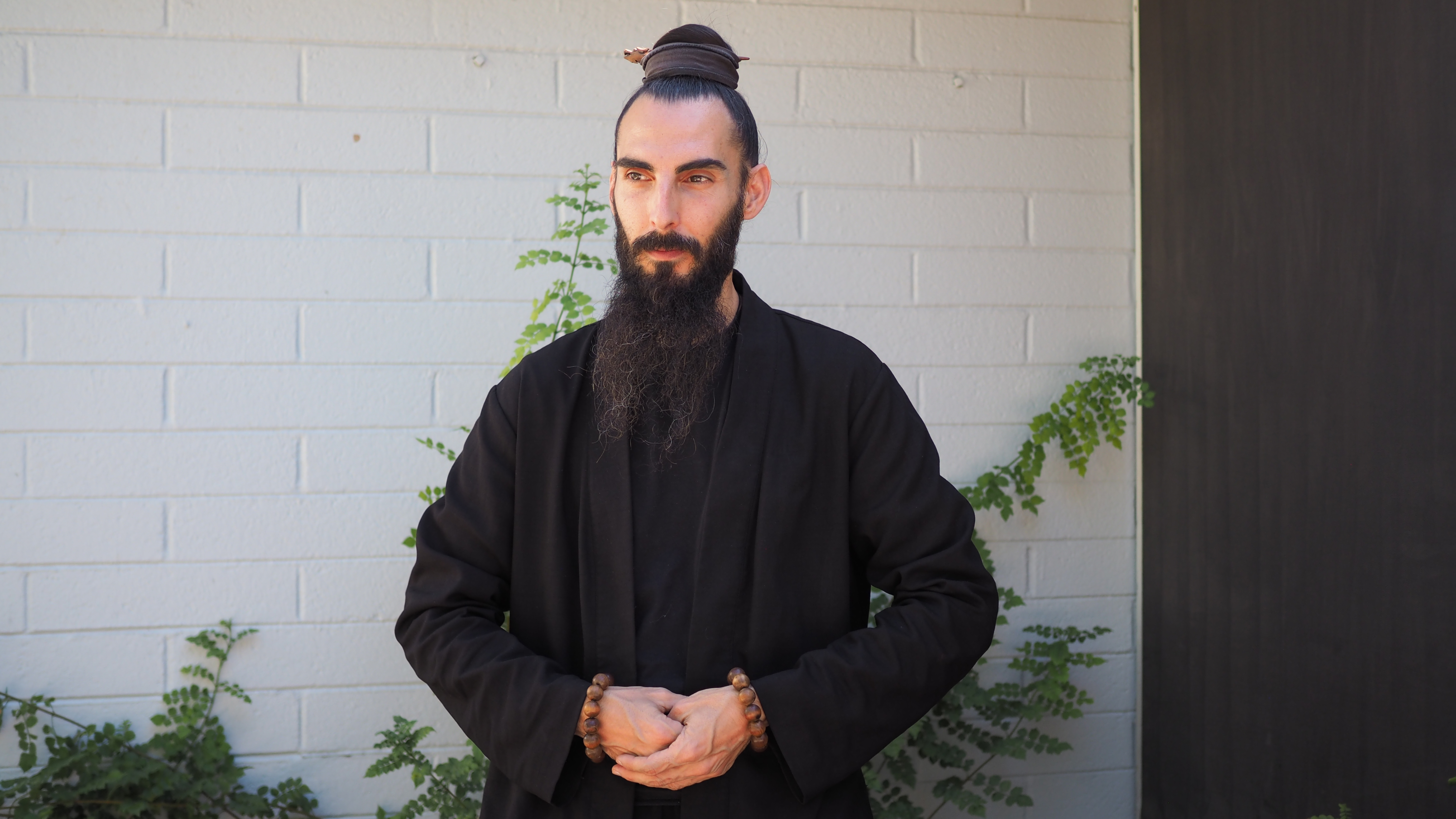
- Born: January 3, 1980 (age 46); Barcelona, Spain
- Other names: 资晓, Zi Xiao
- Occupation: Wudang Taoist Kung Fu Master
- Known for: Taoism, Kung Fu, Taoist Meditation, Tai Chi and Qigong
- Style: Wudang quan
- Awards: Winner of the World Traditional Chinese Kuoshu Championship in 2015

Alex Mieza, Taoist name Zi Xiao (Chinese: 资晓; pinyin: Zī Xiǎo; born January 3, 1980, in Barcelona, Spain) is an international master of traditional Chinese martial arts, Qigong and Internal Alchemy. Mieza represents Sanfeng Pai school of Wudang Taoism, China.

In 2012, Mieza was initiated into the traditional Daoist family of Wudang mountains by the Daoist ritual of Bai Shi (Discipleship Ceremony) becoming an official member of Wudang Sanfeng Pai's Taoist school official lineage, representing the 16th Generation of lineage holders, which dates back to the 14th century when it was created by the historic Daoist monk Zhang Sanfeng (张三丰 Zhāng Sānfēng).

Mieza is the first official Spanish disciple under Taoist master Yuan Xiugang, he represents his master Yuan Xiugang and shares Chinese martial art and Taoism knowledge to the western world.

In 2015, Mieza became the world Kung Fu champion after winning the first place in the World Traditional Chinese Kuoshu Championship in Taiwan.

== See also ==
- Wudang Mountains
- Taoist schools
- Neidan
- Qigong
- Chinese martial arts
- Wudang quan
- Zhang Sanfeng
- Neigong
