= Li Jinglin (general) =

Li Jinglin 李景林
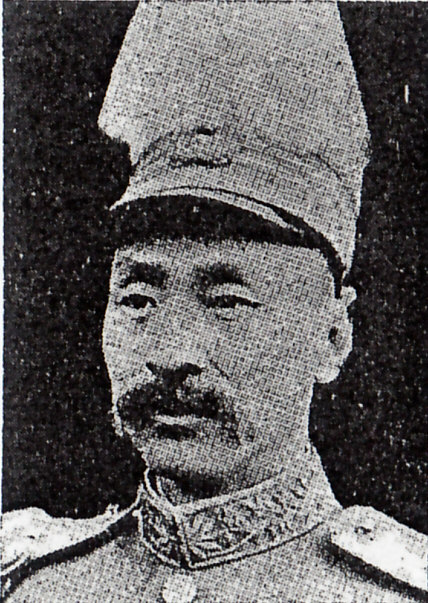
- Born: 1885; Zaoqiang County, Hebei, China
- Died: 1931 (aged 45–46)
- Other names: Li Fangchen "China's First Sword" "God of the Sword"
- Nationality: Chinese
- Style: Yang-style tai chi Wudangquan; Wudang Sword

Li Jinglin
- Chinese: 李景林
Transcriptions
Standard Mandarin
- Hanyu Pinyin: Lǐ Jǐnglín
- Wade–Giles: Li Ching-lin

Li Jinglin, also known as Li Fangchen (1885–1931) was a deputy inspector-general and later army general for the Fengtian clique during the Chinese warlord era. He hailed from Zaoqiang County, Hebei province, China. After his military career was over he settled in Nanjing, and in 1927 moved to Shanghai. A renowned swordsman, he was known as "China's First Sword."

== Military and administrative career ==
In 1924, during the Second Zhili–Fengtian War, Li was commanding the Fengtian Second Army which aided Zhang Zongchang in his decisive victory at Longku; the engagement has been termed "probably the single most important engagement in Zhili's defeat." In November his troops occupied Tianjin, where they picked up half of Wang Chengbin's forces, and under his command a "repressive and predatory" regime was established--especially noted is the extent to which the local merchants were extorted. The US 15th Infantry Regiment, whose mission was to keep the Peking-Mukden Railway open, was based in Tianjin, and small skirmishes occurred between US troops and Li's forces. Like many other warlords who ruled Tianjin, Li was a member of the Green Gang. From December 1924 to December 1925 he was the administrator of Hebei province.

On 11 August 1925 when newly unionized workers at the Japanese-owned Yu Da Cotton Mill in Tianjin presented demands for improved conditions they were stopped by military police deployed by warlord Li Jinglin, the workers called for a strike and caused significant damage to the mill. Workers chased some of the police and factory security forces into the mill courtyard, fighting the police with pickaxes and cutting the factory phone lines. 10 people were killed in a police ambush the following day with several hundred being arrested. The disturbances led to arrests, casualties, and the subsequent suppression of unions by Li Jinglin as well as sending police to surveil unions in foreign Tianjin Concessions.

Li Jinglin participated in the Anti-Fengtian War of 1925-1926.

== Martial arts ==
One of Li's nicknames is "Magic Sword". He displayed great skill as a swordfighter and great interest in martial arts, especially Wudang chuan. Li was nicknamed "China's First Sword" and "God of the Sword." He was an expert in a variety of sword techniques, and later learned Wudang Sword from Song Weiyi, a renowned swordsman who also taught Fu Zhensong. His sword techniques were an amalgamation of the ancient Taoist and the newer baguazhang styles.

After his military career he opened a martial arts center in Nanjing, and became vice-president of the National Martial Arts Academy, also known as Central Hall for National Martial Arts (Zhongyang Guoshuguan), and now called the Central Guoshu Institute. On his initiative, a Yang-style tai chi was formalized, with Yang Chengfu as the most important of the contributors.
