= Temple of the Five Immortals (Shiyan) =

Taoist temple

The Temple of the Five Immortals or Five Immortals Temple (Chinese: 五仙庙, p Wuxianmiao) is a Taoist temple located in Shiyan's Zhangwan District in China's Hubei Province. The temple is situated on the Heavenly Horse (天马, Tianma) peak of White Horse Mountain (白马山, Báimǎ shān) in the Wudang Mountains. The Wudang Mountains are home to a complex of Taoist temples and monasteries and are associated with the Lord of the North, Xuantian Shangdi. The Temple of the Five Immortals is one of the very few temples in the Wudang mountain range which is still maintained by Taoist monks who dedicate their lives to cultivating the great Tao.

Wudang was named a World Heritage Site by the United Nations Educational Scientific Cultural Organization (UNESCO) in 1994.

== Location and Overview ==
Inside Hubei Province, looming above the Yellow Dragon River, at an elevation of 1048 meters, sits the Temple of the Five Immortals. The grounds are located approximately one-hour walking distance from the nearest village, at the base of the mountain. The nearest city is located about a one-hour bus journey from the village. Locals have been honoring this temple for generations as a place of worship and prayer, and many believe the Five Immortals to be their heavenly spiritual protectors. On special days of celebration, many of them will make pilgrimage trips to the temple to pay homage there or to carry daily necessities to the residing Taoists.

== The Temple ==
The temple was erected approximately 1000 years ago during a time of great conflict. It was known then as ‘The Sanctuary’. People who were seeking refuge from war fled to this fortress and were protected by five Taoists who later became known as ‘The Five Immortals’. The temple has been maintained throughout the many centuries that have passed between then and now. An abbot still remains and continues to impart the knowledge passed on by the Five Immortals to the students that are now arriving from all parts of the globe.

== The Restoration Project ==
Although the temple has been maintained throughout the ages, much of it has suffered great damage and has been in a state of disrepair for a long time. In 1995, Master Li Shifu came to practice as an abbot here and to train disciples in the arts of Taoism. Since he has arrived, the restoration project has begun. It has been a slow and challenging process due to the state of dilapidation, but improvement and development has been consistent over the last two decades, and the temple is gradually increasing its capacity to host more students.

== A Brief History of Recent Times ==
The current structure is approximately 100 years old. It is a small, and relatively unknown, and humble estate. The Temple's existence is still unknown to the majority of the world's population. It is known mostly by the local mountain people. There are usually fewer than three Taoist practitioners residing there. It is a simple, peaceful place to practice and potentially cultivate immortality.

== Five Immortals ==
According to the ancient legends, the five Immortals were endowed with great wisdom.

1. The Great Master of this lineage, or The First Immortal, was deeply engaged in his studies of the Book of Changes (known in China as Yi Jing or I Ching). He was also adept in the Confucian Analects and the practices of virtue, compassion, and forbearance in times of great conflict. He pursued the heavens, nurturing and protecting humanity and the constants.
2. The Second Immortal was the most advanced in Gong-Fu and martial arts practices, which he preserved in the interest of protecting the people by martial virtue and physical strength.
3. The third immortal was the master of coursing qi, meditating on stillness and cultivating internal alchemy, with an emphasis on the grasp of life and the reversal of yin and yang.
4. The Fourth of the Immortals was the master of herbal medicine and healing. He rescued humans from their suffering and healed the heart. He was proficient in distinguishing between cause and effect.
5. The Fifth Immortal was a musical expert who was devoted to preserving the rhapsodies, songs, and tunes of the lineage.

The Immortals were known by the locals as the protector deities of their families and relatives. On special days of celebration, the local people would climb the mountain to offer gratitude and reverence or to haul daily necessities to the residing Taoist monks. It is about a one-hour journey on foot from the village to the temple. The Immortals teach people the virtues of morality and compassion and the essence of heart-mind. They teach people to cultivate integrity and to nurture the innate nature of the self. The masters are said to have revealed their supernatural abilities to help people in need, so crowds of people from the surrounding areas often climb to carry sacrificial offerings to them.

== The Abbot ==
Xing De (Taoist name) Date of Birth: 1964, Henan Province, Shang Qiu. Xing De traveled extensively in his youth, seeking out many grand masters in the mountains of China. He was accepted by many elders and has received many names. In 1991, he began his spiritual journey as an official layperson of Taoism. In 1996, he committed himself to a life of renunciation on White Horse Mountain (Wudang, Hubei Province). He studied the practices of cultivating Internal alchemy from the grand masters and devoted much of his time to mantras, rituals, talismans, and Taoist Medicine, for which he received transmissions from the elders. He became the abbot of the Five Immortals Temple in 2000. He is a clergyman of the Mount Wudang Dragon Gate Sect Lineage, and the Pure Yang Sect Lineage and he is a Master of Jing Chan Ceremonies.

== Summary ==
As of 2015, the number of pilgrims has been increasing, and more tourists are arriving on Wudang Mountain. Large numbers visit on weekends and during holidays. The mountain remains quiet during the winter months, but tourists, pilgrims, and explorers arrive in great numbers during the summer months. The disturbance caused by these arrivals is considered necessary for the temple to be sustained. They are considered important source material to promote potential and refinement in the midst of the chaos one must encounter on a spiritual path by the practitioners living in the temple.

== See also ==
- Purple Cloud Temple
- Temple of the Five Immortals in Guangzhou
