= Nanyan Temple =

Taoist temple in Hubei, China

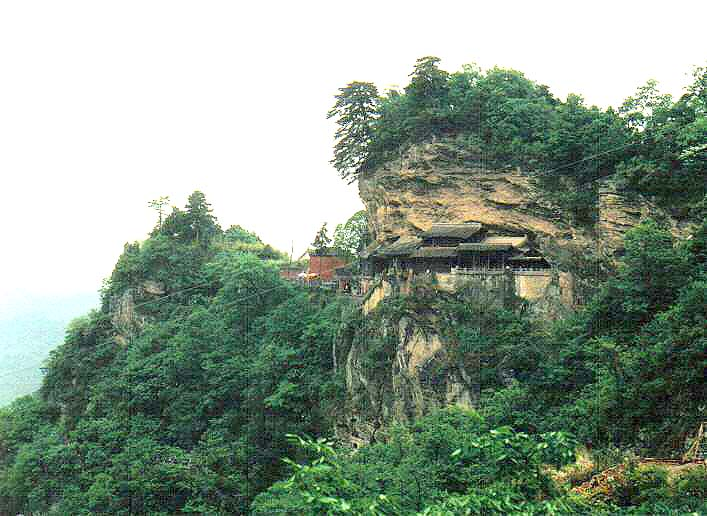
Nanyan Temple

The Nanyan Temple (Chinese: 南岩宫) is a temple in Wudang Mountains, Danjiangkou, Hubei, China. It is known as the place where Emperor Zhen Wu found Taoism and flew to heaven. The whole structure - hall-pillars, beams, arches, gates and windows - is created out of rock.

The temple is enshrined with gilded bronze statues of several dozen Taoist deities, including the God of Prime Origin and the North God. There are also 500 gilded iron statues of the heavenly officials on the cliffs, each about 30 cm tall. With their well-balanced proportions, they are amazingly lifelike.

Nanyan Temple is considered the most spectacular of Wudangshan's three famous temples, the other two being the Purple Cloud Temple (Zixiao gong) and the Golden Hall (Jindian). The temple was officially appointed an Important Relic Preserving Unit in 1996.
