= Wudang Sword =

Chinese martial art

Wudang Sword is a body of Chinese straight sword (jian) techniques in the Wudangquan or internal martial arts.

The oldest reputable accounts of Wudang Sword begin with Grandmaster Song Weiyi around the turn of the 20th century. Sung taught Wudang Sword to Li Jinglin and a few others. He learned the art from a Daoist named Zhang Yehe, who was the 8th generation lineage holder. Song also learned the martial art of bagua from the kung fu brother of Dong Haichuan, credited as the creator of baguazhang.

== See also ==
- Taijijian
