= Song Weiyi =

Chinese swordsman

Song Weiyi (Chinese: 宋唯一; pinyin: Sòng Wéiyī) was born in Liaoning Province of China in 1855. He was the Grandmaster of the Wudang Sword.

He introduced the sword to both Chen-style tai chi and Yang-style tai chi; he taught the Wudang Sword to Guo Qifeng (郭岐鳳), General Li Jinglin, and Fu Zhensong.
