= Purple Cloud Temple =

Taoist temple in Hubei, China

Coordinates: 32°25′36″N 111°01′22″E

- Traditional Chinese: 紫霄宮
- Simplified Chinese: 紫霄宫
Transcriptions
Standard Mandarin
- Hanyu Pinyin: Zǐxiāo Gōng
- IPA: [tsì.ɕjáʊ kʊ́ŋ]
Yue: Cantonese
- Jyutping: Zi2siu^{1} Gung^{1}
- IPA: [tsi˧˥.siw˥ kʊŋ˥]
Middle Chinese
- Middle Chinese: tsjeX-sjew kjuwng

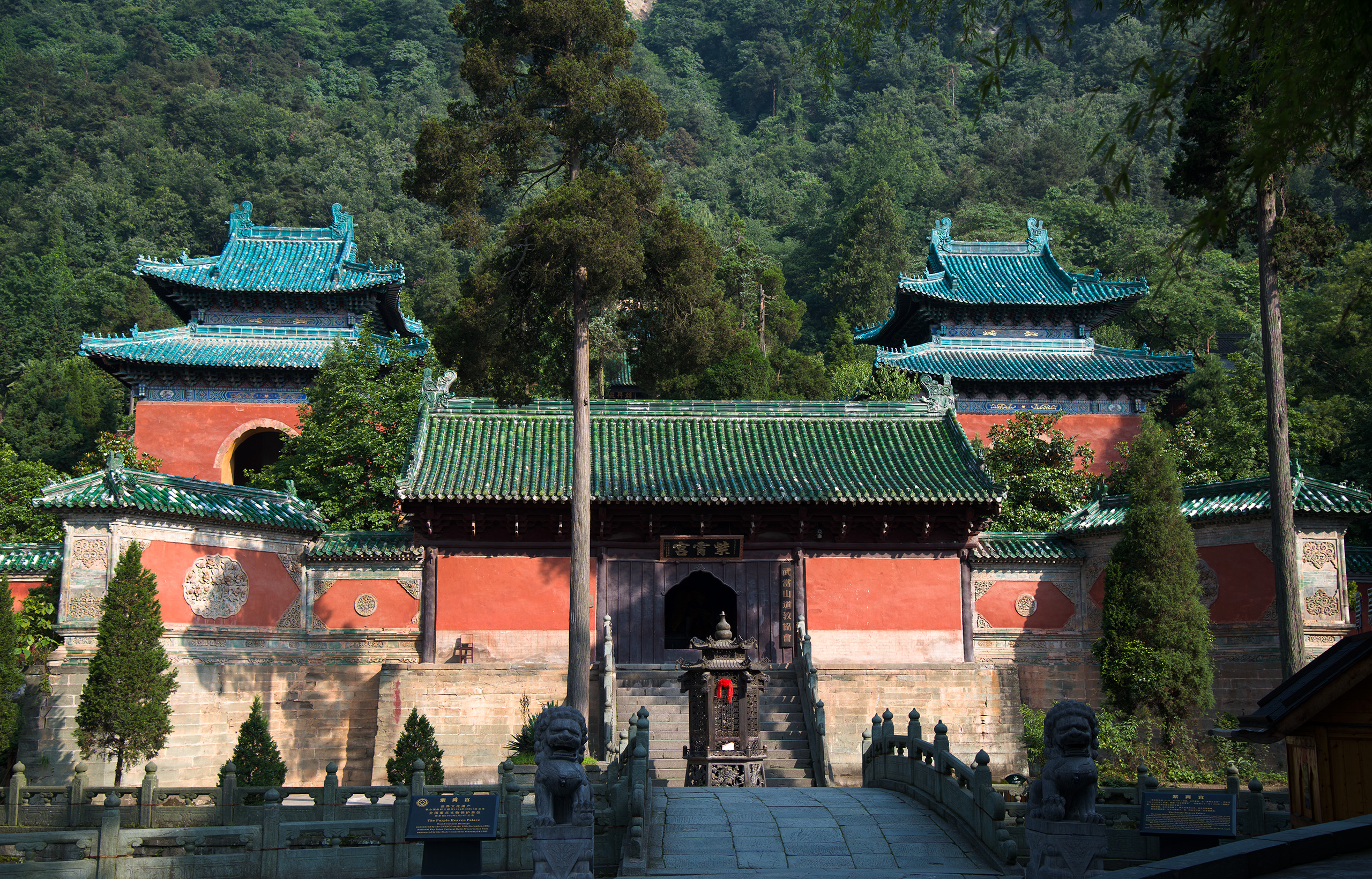
Entrance of the Purple Cloud Temple

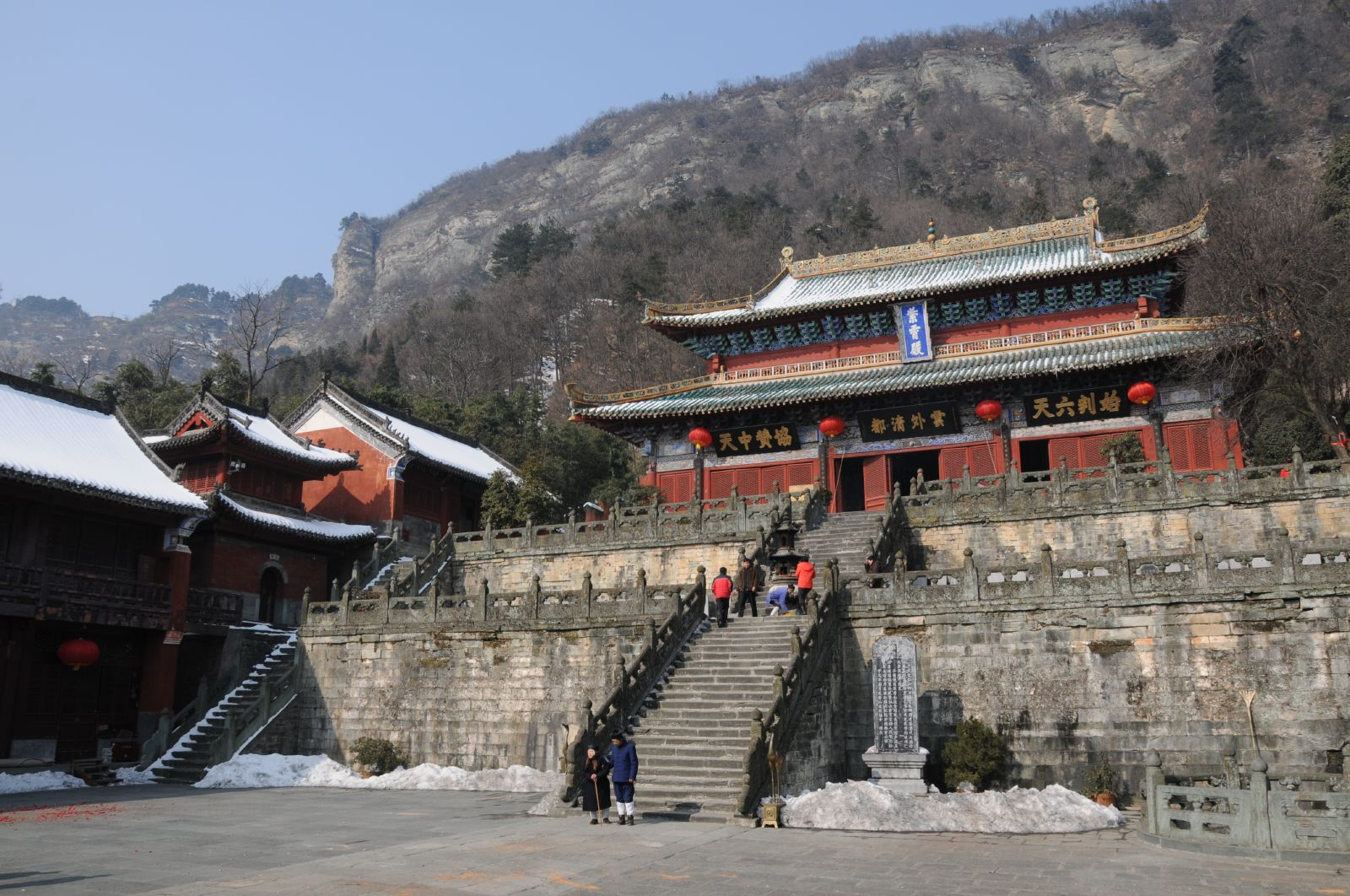
Inside courtyard

The Zixiao Palace (Chinese: 紫霄宮; pinyin: Zǐxiāo Gōng) or Purple Cloud Temple, standing on Zhanqi Peak, is a Taoist temple of the Wudang Mountains Taoist complex in the northwestern part of Hubei, China.

== History ==
After being built in 1119–26, it was rebuilt in 1413 and extended in 1803–20.

== Temple complex ==
The Purple Cloud Temple consists of several halls and Daoist statues including the Dragon and Tiger Hall, the Purple Sky Hall, the East Hall, the West Hall, the Parent Hall and the Prince Cliff. The Purple Sky Hall is enshrined with statues of Zhen Wu at different stages of his life. Statues of Zhen Wu's parents rest in the Parent Hall. On the left side is the Chinese deity Guanyin, and on the right is the Shouzi Mother to whom couples traditionally pray for sons. The hall also houses cultural relics, some of which date back as far as the 7th century, including the Green Dragon Crescent Blade.
