= Xuanwu (god) =

Taoist water deity, tutelary deity of Ming Empire

- God of war, water, and Patron deity of Ming Dynasty
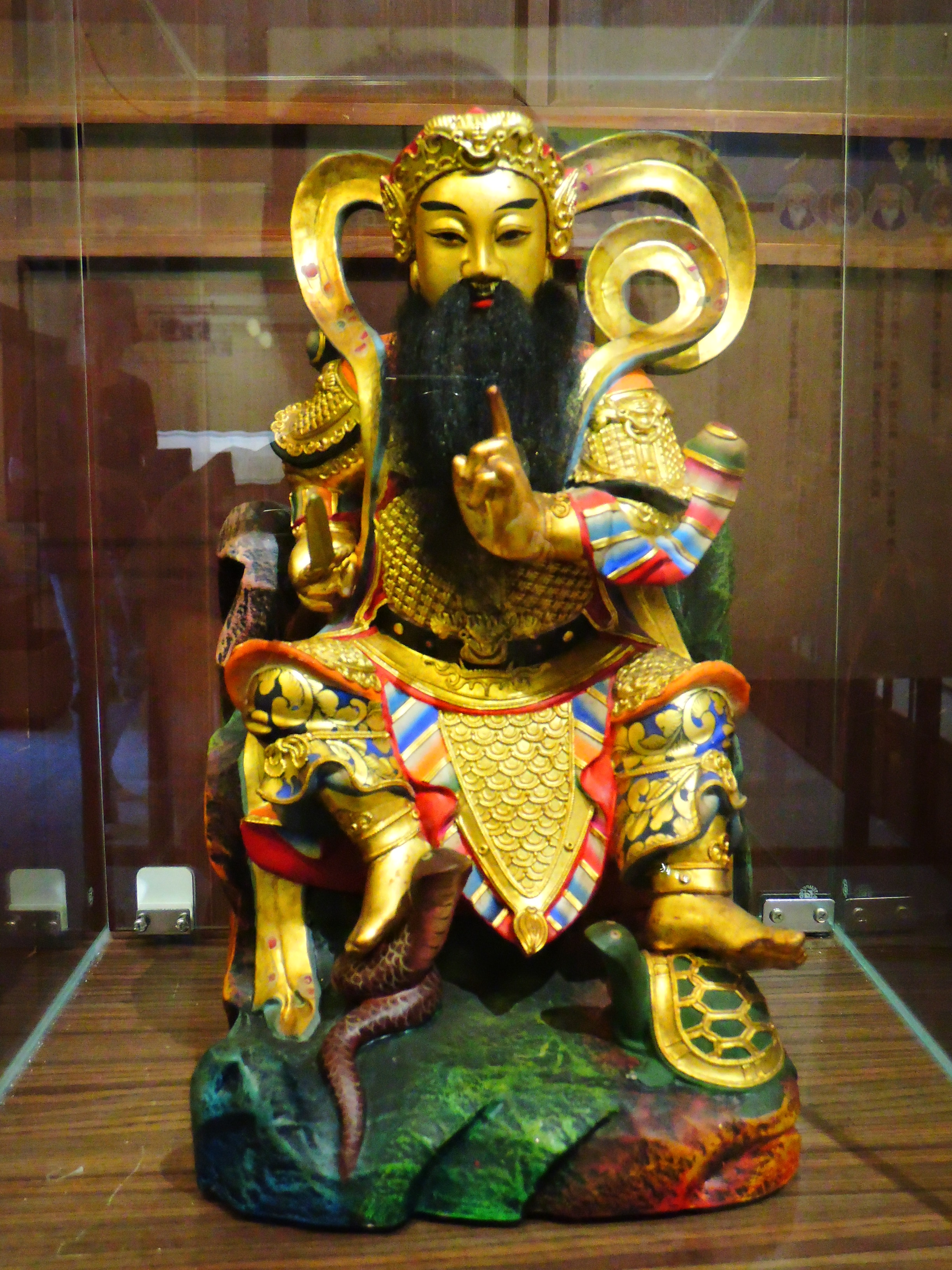
- Statue of Zhenwu or Xuantian by Zheng Yongtai (Penghu)
- Other names: 玄天上帝
- Abode: Mount Wudang
- Weapon: Ursa Major Sword
- Symbols: Sword, Turtle, Snake
- Day: 3rd day of 3rd lunar month
- Gender: Male
- Parents: King Mingzhen of Jingle Kingdom (Father); Queen Shansheng (Mother)

Xuantian Shangdi

Chinese name
- Chinese: 玄天上帝
- Literal meaning: Dark (or Mysterious) Heavenly Highest Deity
Transcriptions
Standard Mandarin
- Hanyu Pinyin: Xuántiān shàngdì
- Bopomofo: ㄒㄩㄢ´ ㄊㄧㄢ ㄕㄤ` ㄉㄧ`
Yue: Cantonese
- Yale Romanization: Yùhn tīn seuhng dai
- Jyutping: Jyun^{4} tin^{1} soeng^{6} dai^{3}
Southern Min
- Hokkien POJ: Hiân-thian siōng-tè
- Tâi-lô: Hiân-thian siōng-tè
- Teochew Peng'im: Hiang^{5} tiêng^{1} siang^{6} di^{3}

Alternative Chinese name
- Chinese: 玄武
- Literal meaning: Dark (or Mysterious) Warrior
Transcriptions
Standard Mandarin
- Hanyu Pinyin: Xuánwǔ
- Bopomofo: ㄒㄩㄢˊ ㄨˇ
Yue: Cantonese
- Yale Romanization: Yùhn móuh
- Jyutping: Jyun^{4} mou^{5}
Southern Min
- Hokkien POJ: Hiân-bú
- Tâi-lô: Hiân-bú
- Teochew Peng'im: Hiang^{5} bhu^{2}

Xuandi
- Chinese: 玄帝
- Literal meaning: Mysterious Emperor
Transcriptions
Standard Mandarin
- Hanyu Pinyin: Xuándì
- Bopomofo: ㄒㄩㄢˊ ㄉㄧ`
- Wade–Giles: Hsüan^{2}-ti^{4}
Yue: Cantonese
- Yale Romanization: Yùhn dai
- Jyutping: Jyun^{4} Dai^{3}
Southern Min
- Hokkien POJ: Hiân-tè
- Tâi-lô: Hiân-tè
- Teochew Peng'im: Hiang^{5} di^{3}

Zhenwu
- Chinese: 真武
- Literal meaning: True Warrior / Truly Valiant
Transcriptions
Standard Mandarin
- Hanyu Pinyin: Zhēnwǔ
- Bopomofo: ㄓㄣ ㄨˇ
- Wade–Giles: Chên^{1}-wu^{3}
Yue: Cantonese
- Yale Romanization: Jān móuh
- Jyutping: Zan^{1} mou^{5}
Southern Min
- Hokkien POJ: Chin-bú
- Tâi-lô: Tsin-bú
- Teochew Peng'im: Zing^{1} bhu^{2}

Zhenwu dadi
- Chinese: 真武大帝
- Literal meaning: True Martial Great Emperor / Truly Valiant Great Emperor
Transcriptions
Standard Mandarin
- Hanyu Pinyin: Zhēnwǔ dàdì
- Bopomofo: ㄓㄣ ㄨˇ ㄉㄚ` ㄉㄧ`
Yue: Cantonese
- Yale Romanization: Jān móuh daaih dai
- Jyutping: Zan^{1} mou^{5} daai^{6} dai^{3}
Southern Min
- Hokkien POJ: Chin-bú tāi-tè
- Tâi-lô: Tsin-bú tāi-tè
- Teochew Peng'im: Zing^{1} bhu^{2} dai^{6} di^{3}

Tua Lao Aie
- Traditional Chinese: 大老爺
- Simplified Chinese: 大老爷
- Literal meaning: Big Deity
Transcriptions
Standard Mandarin
- Hanyu Pinyin: Dàlǎoyé
- Bopomofo: ㄉㄚ` ㄌㄠˇ ㄧㄝˊ
- Wade–Giles: Ta^{4}-lao^{3}-yeh^{2}
Yue: Cantonese
- Yale Romanization: Daaih lóuh yèh/yé
- Jyutping: Daai^{6} lou^{5} je^{4}
Southern Min
- Hokkien POJ: Tōa lāu-iâ
- Tâi-lô: Tuā láu-iâ
- Teochew Peng'im: Dua^{7} lao^{6/2} ia^{5}

Vietnamese name
- Vietnamese alphabet: Trấn Vũ
- Chữ Hán: 鎮武

Thai name
- Thai: เจ้าพ่อใหญ่
- RTGS: Chao Pho Yai

Korean name
- Hangul: 현천상제
- Hanja: 玄天上帝
Transcriptions
- Revised Romanization: Hyeoncheon Sangje
- McCune–Reischauer: Hyŏnch'ŏn Sangje

Indonesian name
- Indonesian: Xuan Tian Shang Di

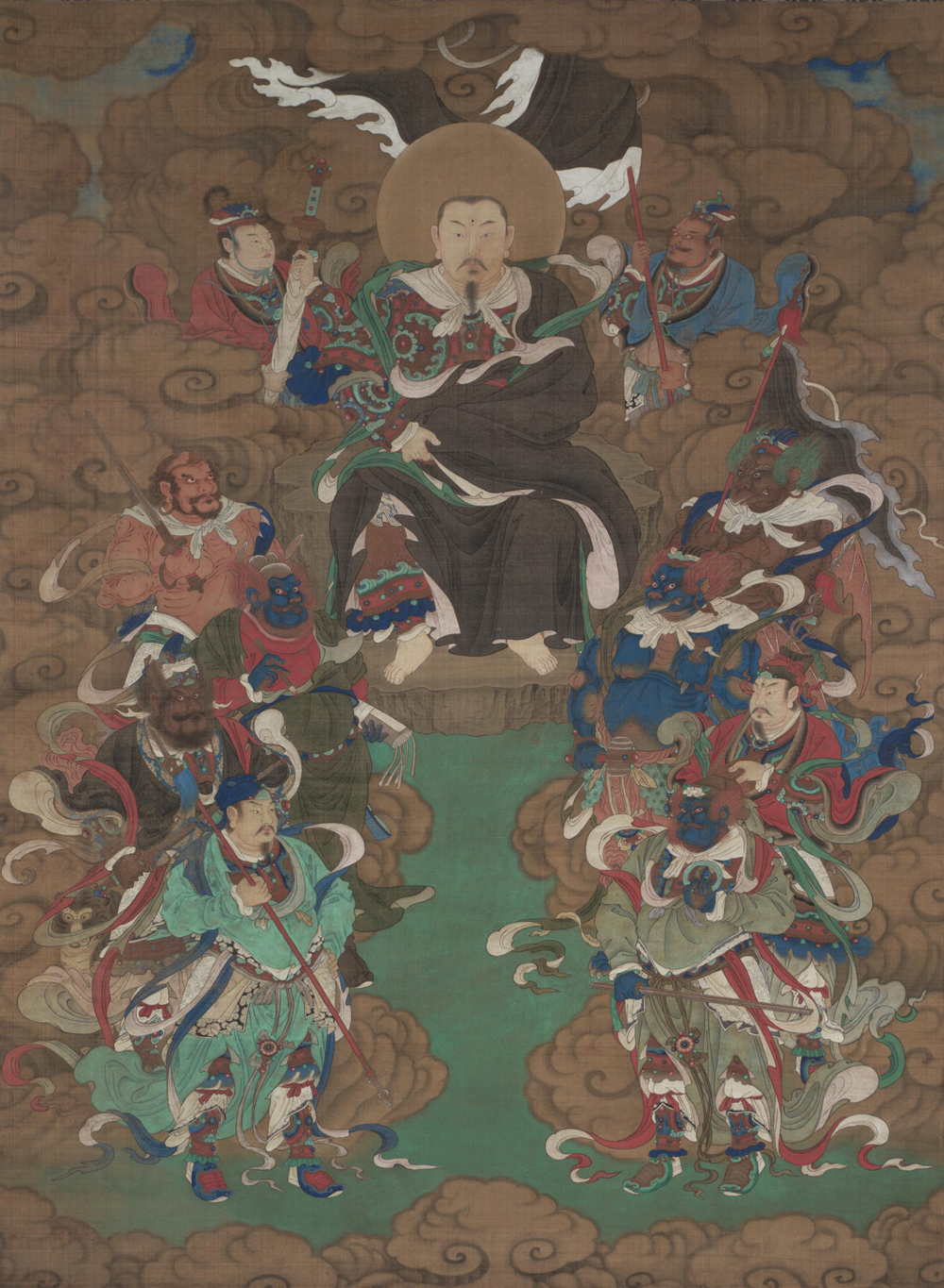
A Ming painting of Xuanwu in his position as Xuantian Shangdi (Supreme Emperor of the Dark Heaven), seated on a rock throne in the clouds surrounded by attendants and divine marshals

Xuanwu (玄武) or Xuandi (Chinese: 玄帝; pinyin: Xuándì), also known as Zhenwu (真武, lit. 'True Warrior' or 'Truly Valiant') or Zhenwu Dadi (真武大帝, lit. 'True Martial Great Emperor' or 'Truly Valiant Great Emperor'), is a deity in Chinese religion and one of the higher-ranking deities in Taoism. He is identified as the god of the north, associated with water, winter, and the Black Turtle-Snake — one of the Four Symbols of the Chinese constellations. He is particularly revered by practitioners of martial arts and as a protective deity against evil and disease.

Xuanwu is widely worshipped throughout China, particularly in the northern provinces of Hebei and Henan from which his cult originated, and from the Tang–Song period onward also in southern provinces including Guangdong, Guangxi, and Fujian, as well as among the overseas Chinese diaspora.

The Yongle Emperor of the Ming dynasty claimed to have received the divine assistance of Xuanwu during his successful Jingnan Campaign (1399–1402) against his nephew, and as emperor sponsored the construction of an extensive complex of Taoist monasteries in the Wudang Mountains of Hubei, establishing Xuanwu as a tutelary deity of the Ming imperial house.

== Names and etymology ==
The name Xuanwu (玄武) is a compound of xuan (玄), meaning "dark", "mysterious", or "black", and wu (武), meaning "martial" or "warrior". The literal translation is "Dark Warrior" or "Mysterious Warrior", reflecting the deity's association with the dark, watery, yin qualities of the north.

The name was changed to Zhenwu (真武, "True Warrior") during the Northern Song dynasty under the Zhenzong Emperor (r. 997–1022) to avoid a taboo on the character xuan (玄), which appeared in the personal name of a Song imperial ancestor. Both Xuanwu and Zhenwu remain in common use, with regional preferences.

The honorific title Xuantian Shangdi (玄天上帝, "Dark Heavenly Highest Deity") emerged with the deity's elevation to imperial divinity in later periods.

== Black Turtle-Snake ==
Xuanwu is one of the Four Symbols of the Chinese constellations, representing the north and the winter season. He is usually depicted in cosmological contexts as a turtle entwined together with a snake.

The earliest references to Xuanwu appear in Han dynasty (206 BCE – 220 CE) texts in the context of correlative cosmology, in which the Four Symbols were assigned to the four cardinal directions of the sky. At this stage, Xuanwu was a cosmological symbol rather than a personified deity, representing one of the four sets of seven mansions among the twenty-eight lunar mansions of Chinese astronomy.

== History ==
=== Song dynasty development ===
Xuanwu's transformation from a cosmological symbol into a personified deity with a developed mythology and active cult began during the Song dynasty (960–1279). The cult expanded substantially during this period through the construction of Zhenwu temples, the development of hagiographic narratives presenting him as a divinised mortal who attained immortality through self-cultivation, and his integration into Taoist ritual systems. Imperial patronage by Song emperors, including the Zhenzong and Huizong emperors, contributed to his rising status.

=== Ming dynasty patronage ===
Xuanwu reached the height of his imperial status during the Ming dynasty (1368–1644), particularly under the Yongle Emperor (r. 1402–1424). Having usurped the throne from his nephew the Jianwen Emperor in the Jingnan Campaign, the Yongle Emperor claimed that Xuanwu had appeared during the campaign and granted him divine assistance. To express gratitude and to consolidate his legitimacy, the Yongle Emperor sponsored a massive construction programme in the Wudang Mountains of Hubei, where Xuanwu was said to have attained immortality.

Between 1412 and 1424, large numbers of labourers and soldiers were mobilised for the Wudang construction, producing a complex of palaces, monasteries, and temples that became the institutional centre of Xuanwu worship. The Wudang complex was inscribed as a UNESCO World Heritage Site in 1994.

=== Later periods ===
Xuanwu worship continued throughout the Qing dynasty (1644–1912) and into the modern period. From the late imperial period, the cult spread southward through migration, and Xuanwu temples were established throughout southern Chinese provinces and in Overseas Chinese communities across Southeast Asia.

== Stories ==
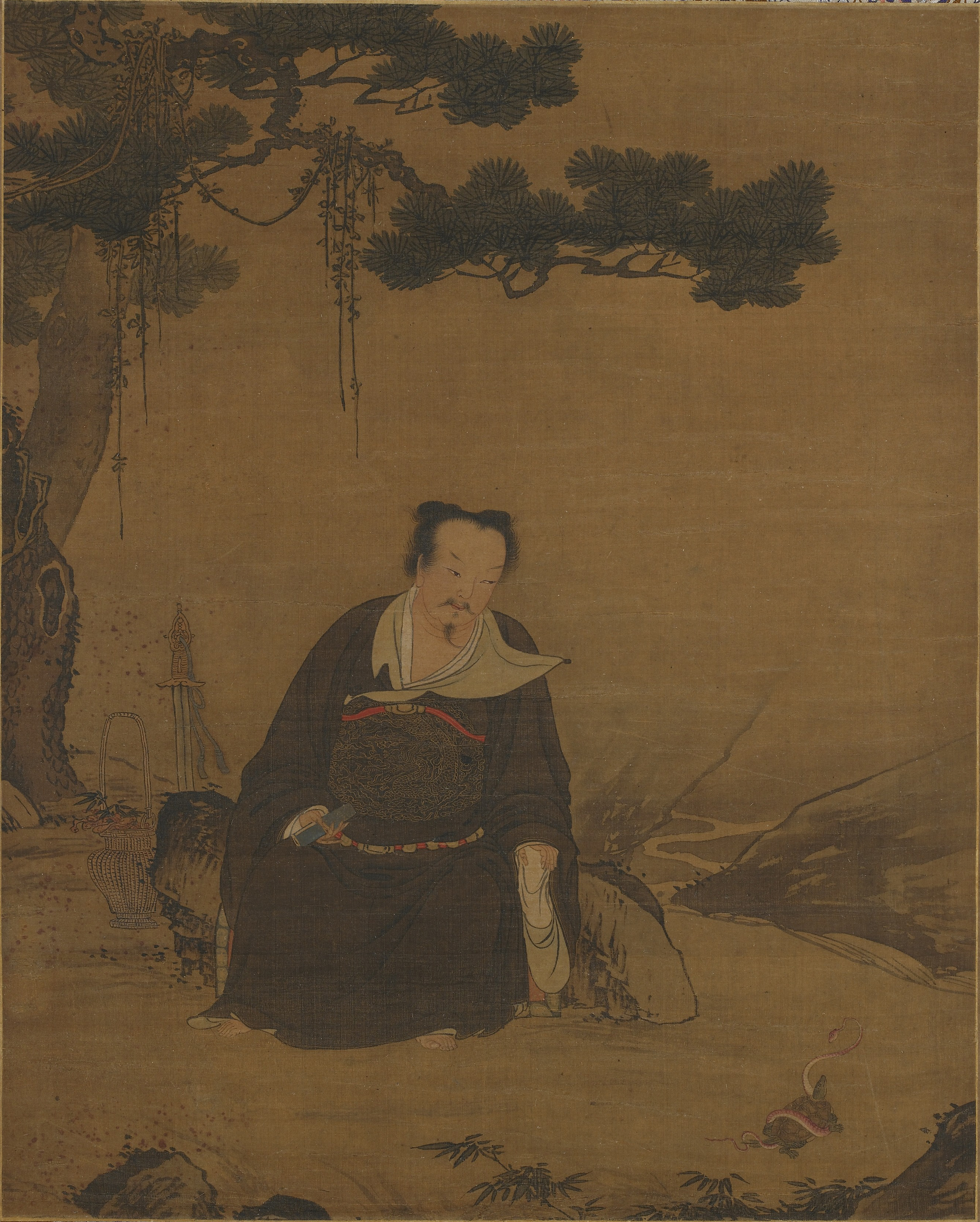
A painting of Xuanwu, Ming dynasty, housed in the Freer Gallery of Art

Several legendary narratives account for Xuanwu's origins as a deified figure.

=== The original story ===
One tradition identifies Xuanwu as a prince of the Jingle Kingdom (淨樂國) in northern Hebei, born to King Mingzhen and Queen Shansheng. Renouncing his royal inheritance, he travelled to a remote mountain — traditionally identified with Mount Wudang — where he spent forty-two years in self-cultivation, eventually attaining immortality.

=== Qing Dynasty version ===
A later tradition recorded during the Qing dynasty recounts that Xuanwu was originally a butcher who had killed many animals. Over time, his conscience troubled him, and upon repenting he abandoned butchery and retired to a remote mountain to cultivate the Tao.

In a related hagiographic narrative, after assisting a woman in labour, he washed her bloodstained garments in a river nearby, when the words "Dark (or Mysterious) Heavenly Highest Deity" (玄天上帝 Xuántiān Shàngdì) appeared before him. The woman in labour was a manifestation of the bodhisattva Guanyin, who was testing his resolve. To redeem his sins, he disembowelled himself and washed his stomach and intestines in the river. The river became dark and murky, then flowed clear and pure once again. The Jade Emperor, moved by his sincerity, made him an immortal with the title Xuantian Shangdi.

After he became an immortal, his discarded viscera absorbed the essence of the earth and transformed into a demonic turtle and a demonic snake, which began to harm people. Xuanwu eventually returned to subdue them, and thereafter they served as his attendants — providing a narrative origin for his iconographic association with these two animals.

=== Generals Wan Gong and Wan Ma ===
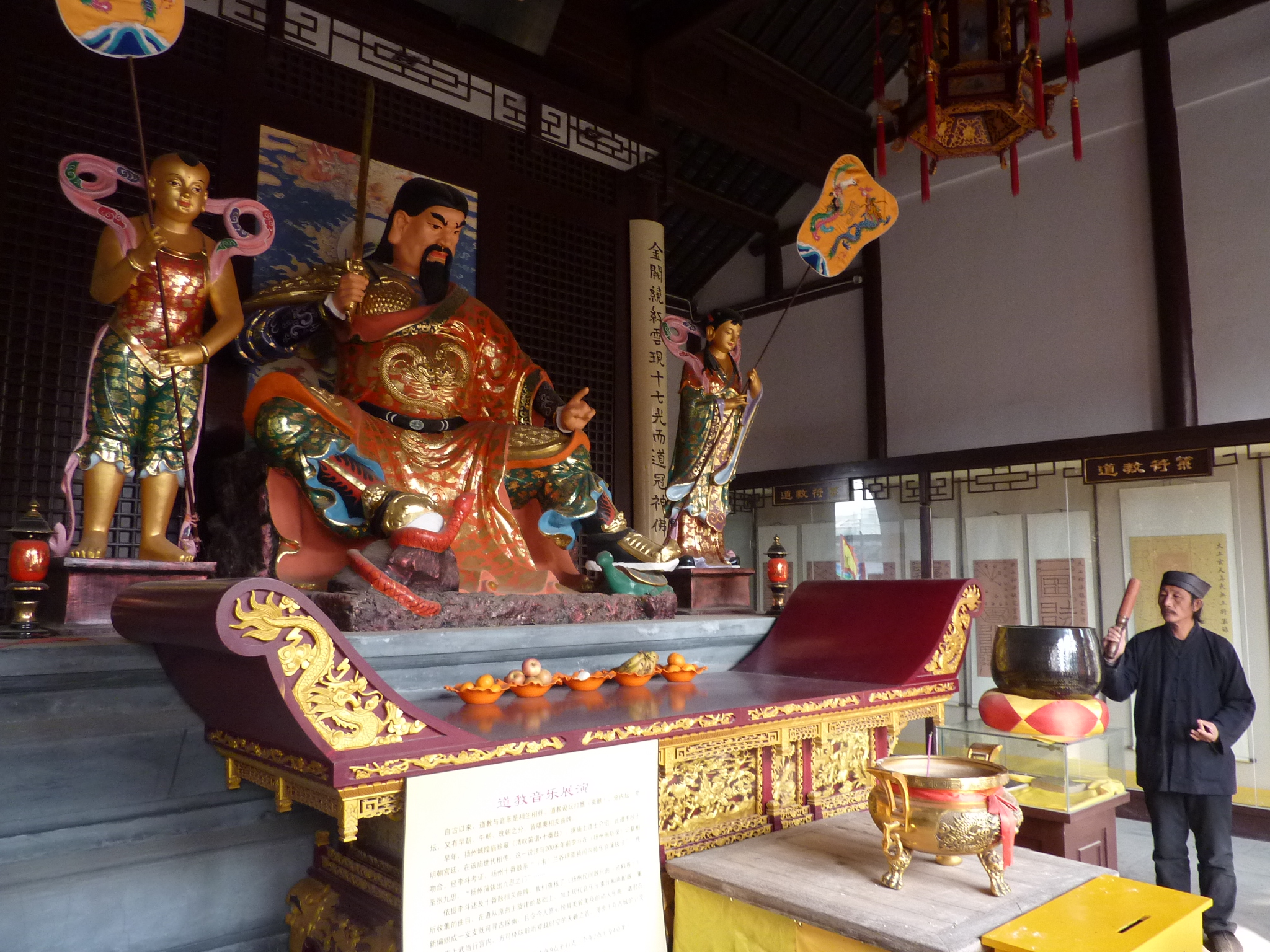
Zhenwu (Xuanwu) with the two generals, and the Snake and Tortoise figures at his feet, at the Wudang Temple of Yangzhou.

Xuanwu is sometimes portrayed with two generals standing beside him, General Wan Gong (萬公) and General Wan Ma (萬媽).

== Worship ==
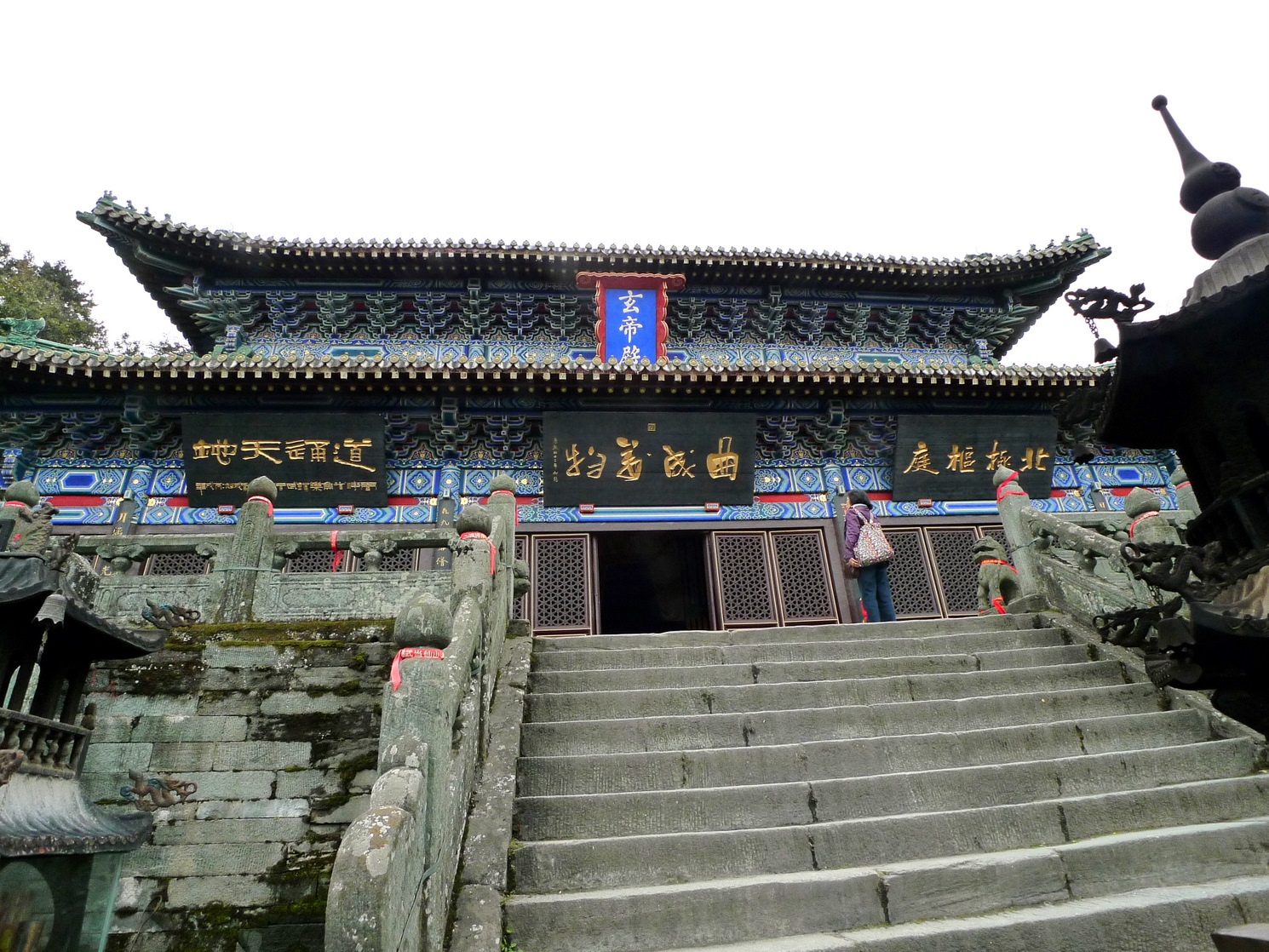
Temple of the Dark Deity (玄帝殿) at the Wudang Mountains.

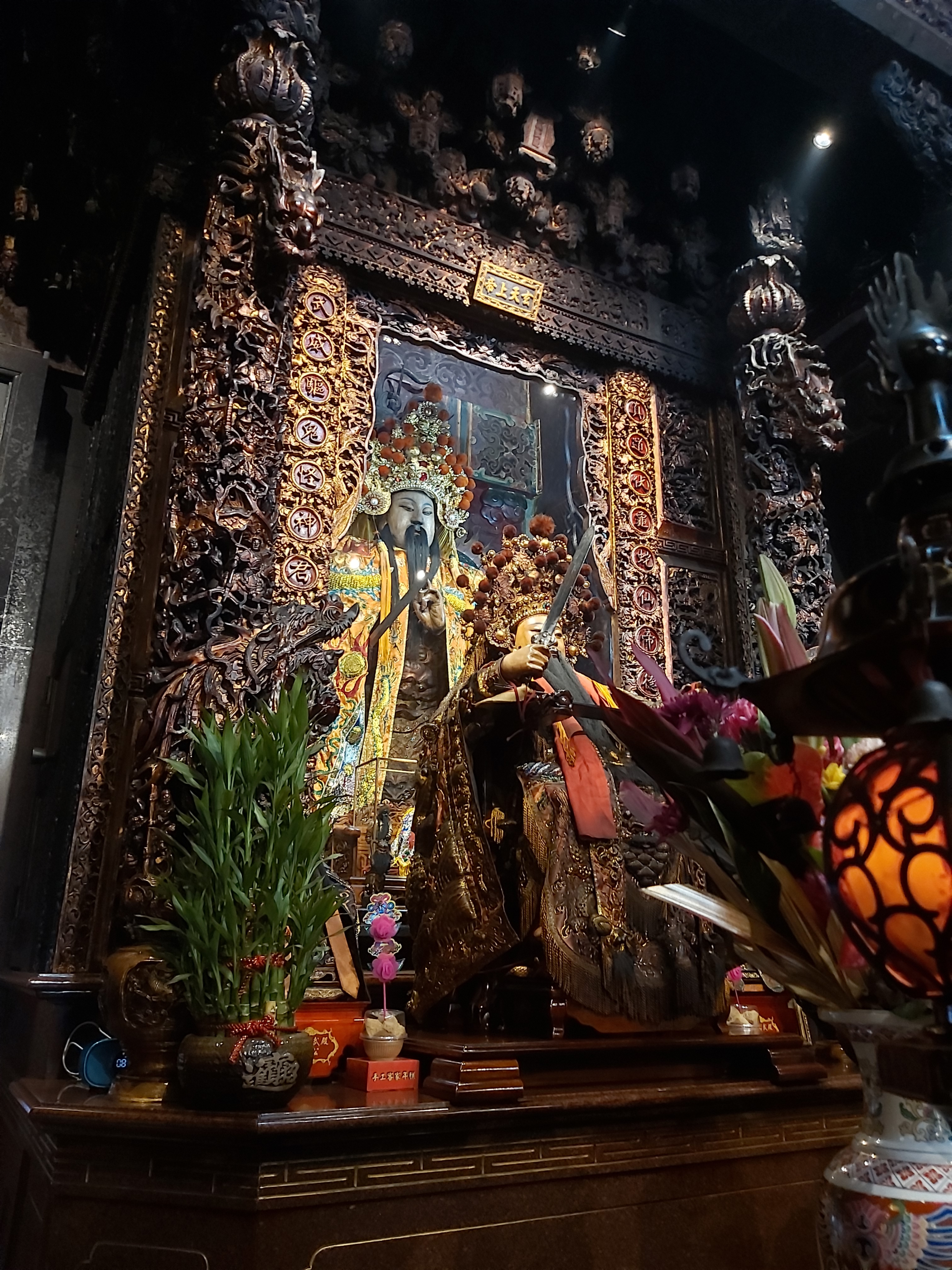
Statue of Xuanwu at Bangka Zhenwu Temple (艋舺真武殿), Wanhua District, Taipei.

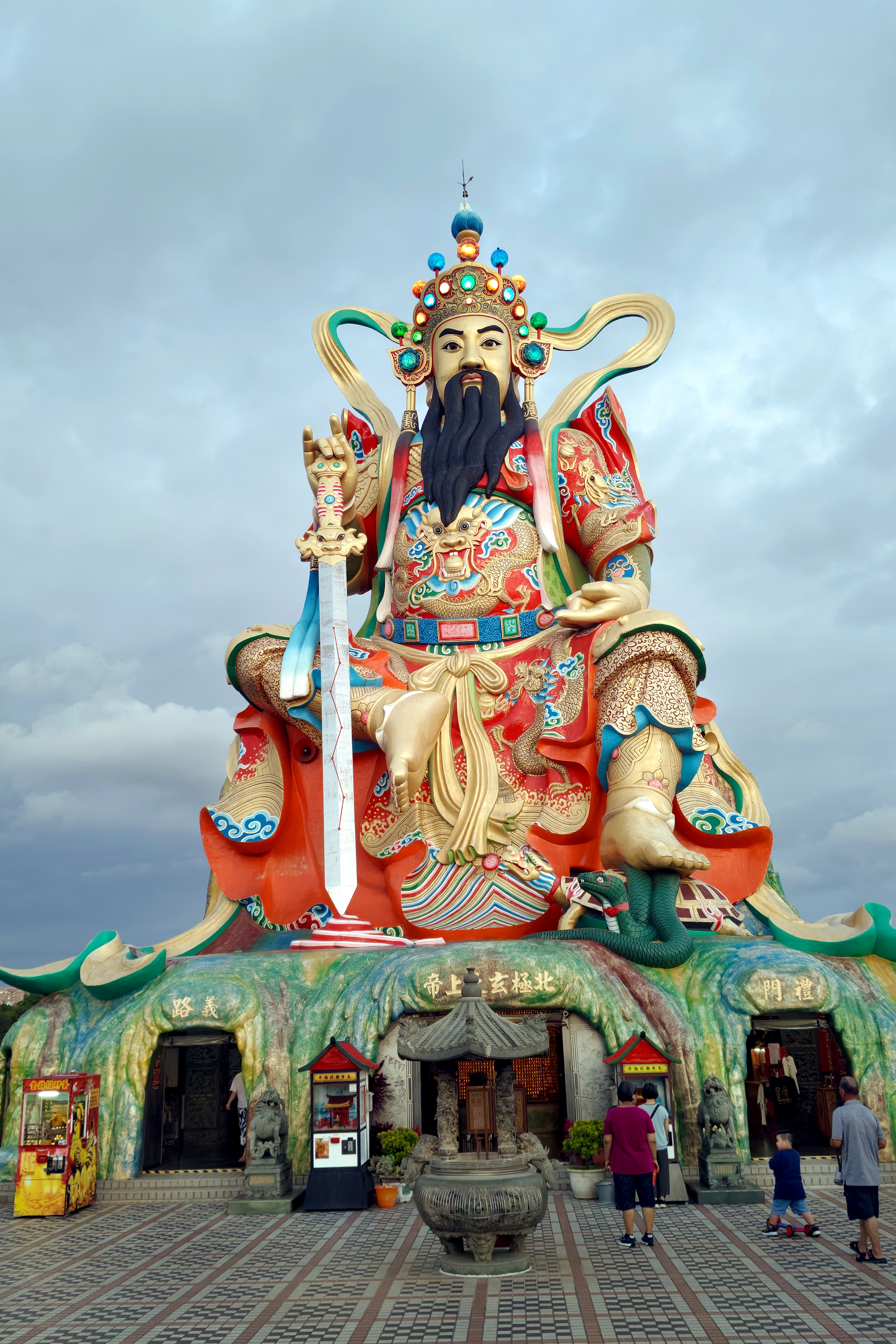
Xuantian Shangdi Statue at Lotus Pond in Kaohsiung

=== Depiction ===
Xuanwu is typically portrayed as a warrior figure seated on a throne, wearing dark or black imperial robes, with bare feet and loose, unbound hair. He is most often shown with a turtle and a snake at his feet — the snake usually coiled around or beneath the turtle — representing his attendants and recalling his cosmological association with the Black Tortoise.

His left hand holds the "three mountain seal", somewhat similar to Guan Yu's hand seal, while his right hand holds a sword, traditionally identified in some legends as the Ursa Major sword (七星寶劍, Qīxīng Bǎojiàn) associated with the Big Dipper.

In one popular legend, the sword is said to have belonged to Lü Dongbin, one of the Eight Immortals, from whom Xuanwu borrowed it to subdue a powerful demon; after witnessing the sword's power he refused to return it, and is said to hold the sword tightly because it would magically return to its original owner if released.

His birthday is celebrated on the third day of the third lunar month.

=== Wudang Mountains ===
The Wudang Mountains in northwestern Hubei are the principal cult centre of Xuanwu and one of the Four Sacred Mountains of Taoism. According to tradition, Xuanwu attained immortality on Wudang after his long period of self-cultivation.

The Wudang temple complex, largely constructed under the Yongle Emperor's patronage in the early 15th century, includes such structures as the Golden Hall (金殿) at the summit of Tianzhu Peak, the Purple Cloud Palace (紫霄宮), and the walled "Forbidden City" of the Taihe Palace (太和宮). The complex has also been historically associated with the practice of Wudangquan martial arts, including tai chi, whose traditional founder Zhang Sanfeng is associated with the mountain.

=== Worship in Taiwan ===
Xuanwu is among the most widely worshipped deities in Taiwan, where he is generally known by the title Xuantian Shangdi. The cult was carried from Fujian and Guangdong to Taiwan towards the end of the Ming dynasty and was favoured by the followers of Cheng Chenggong (Koxinga), whose Ming-loyalist Kingdom of Tungning was based in Tainan; of the 26 Taoist temples founded during Cheng's rule (1662–1683), seven were dedicated to Xuantian Shangdi as their principal deity. After the Qing dynasty annexed Taiwan in 1684, official patronage was redirected towards the sea goddess Mazu, and Xuantian Shangdi's prestige declined, though his temples persisted, particularly in inland mountainous areas. He nonetheless remained among the most popular temple deities on the island, ranking fifth by number of dedicated temples in surveys of 1918 (with 172 temples) and 1981. The principal centre of his worship in Taiwan is the Shoutian Temple (受天宮) at Songboling in Nantou County, from which several thousand branch shrines have "divided incense" (分香); his birthday on the third day of the third lunar month draws large numbers of pilgrims there.

=== Worship in Indonesia ===
In Indonesia, altars to Xuantian Shangdi are found in many Taoist temples (klenteng), particularly in Central Java communities with historical ties to southern China. The worshipers of Chen Fu Zhen Ren, especially at Tik Liong Tian Temple, Rogojampi, Banyuwangi Regency, East Java, regard Xuantian Shangdi as their patron deity, placing his altar at the right side of Chen Fu Zhen Ren's altar in the central room of the temple traditionally reserved for the main deity.

=== Worship in Thailand ===
Xuanwu is known among the Thai people as Chao Pho Yai or Tua Lao Ia (大老爷 "Big Deity") in the Teochew dialect. He is sometimes conflated with Chao Pho Suea (Tiger God), as the two are often worshipped together in the same shrine, with Xuanwu seated in the central position and the Tiger God to one side. Several shrines dedicated to him exist in Thailand, including those in the Sam Yan area of Bangkok and along Phetkasem Road on the Thonburi side of the city. These shrines are visited by both Thai and Chinese worshippers, particularly during Chinese New Year.

== In culture ==
Xuanwu appears as a character in the 16th-century Chinese classic novel Journey to the West, in which he is depicted as a king of the north with two generals serving under him, a "Tortoise General" and a "Snake General", residing at a temple in the Wudang Mountains of Hubei. The Tortoise Mountain (龜山) and Snake Mountain (蛇山) on opposite sides of a river in Wuhan, the capital of Hubei, take their names from this association with Xuanwu's two animal attendants.

== See also ==
- Black Tortoise
- Chinese folk religion
- Four Symbols
- Jade Emperor
- Sacred Mountains of China
- Taoism
- Wudang Mountains
- Wudangquan
- Yongle Emperor
- Zhang Sanfeng

== Sources ==
- Chao, Shin-Yi (2011). Daoist Ritual, State Religion, and Popular Practices: Zhenwu Worship from Song to Ming (960–1644). Routledge Studies in Taoism. Routledge. ISBN 978-0-415-78066-7.
- de Bruyn, Pierre-Henry (2004). "Wudang Shan: The Origins of a Major Center of Modern Taoism". In Lagerwey, John (ed.). Religion and Chinese Society, Volume 2: Taoism and Local Religion in Modern China. Hong Kong: Chinese University Press. pp. 553–590. ISBN 962-996-123-7.
- Stepanchuk, Carol (1991). Mooncakes and Hungry Ghosts: Festivals of China. San Francisco: China Books & Periodicals. ISBN 0-8351-2481-9.
- Stevens, Keith G. (2001). Chinese Mythological Gods. Images of Asia. Oxford University Press. ISBN 978-0-19-591990-5.
