= Outline of Taoism =

Overview of and topical guide to Taoism

The following outline is provided as an overview of and topical guide to Taoism:

Taoism – philosophical, ethical, and religious tradition of Chinese origin that emphasizes living in harmony with the Tao (also romanized as Dao). The term Tao means "way", "path" or "principle", and can also be found in Chinese philosophies and religions other than Taoism. In Taoism, however, Tao denotes something that is both the source and the driving force behind everything that exists. It is ultimately ineffable: "The Tao that can be told is not the eternal Tao." Also called Daoism.

== Texts ==
- Laozi (Tao Te Ching)
- Zhuangzi
- Liezi
- Daozang

== Taoist beliefs and doctrines ==
=== Basic concepts ===
- Non-duality (Wuji) ― the holistic unity of contradictory opposites.
- Polarity (Taiji) ― the basic concept of interdependent, interpenetrating opposites coexisting and complementing one another as expressed in the ‘bright and dark’ (yin and yang) symbol. Yin, the negative, passive, (traditionally) feminine side, must interact with yang, the positive, active, (traditionally) masculine side. Without one the other cannot exist.
- Five Phases (Wu Xing) ― according to the Taoist tradition there are five basic phases or states of matter in the universe: metal, wood, fire, water, and earth. These are not literally metal, wood, fire, water, and earth but are rather metaphors for lesser-yin (shaoyin), greater-yin (taiyin), lesser-yang (shaoyang), greater-yang (taiyang), and dynamic equilibrium. Understanding how each contributes and influences one another is essential to traditional Taoist metaphysics and natural philosophy.
- Perpetual change (Bianhua) ― the concept that everything flows in a perpetual cycle of change and transformation.
- Reversal (Fan) ― the cyclical transformation of things into their opposites and back again comprising an eternal return.
- Non-action (Wu wei) ― flexibility and spontaneity of one's actions.
- Authenticity (Ziran) ― literally "self-so"; natural authenticity.
- Dao (a.k.a. Tao) ― Chinese concept signifying way, path, route, or sometimes more loosely, doctrine or principle, or as a verb, speak. Within the context of traditional Chinese philosophy and religion, Dao is a metaphysical concept originating with Laozi that gave rise to a religion (in Wade–Giles: Tao Chiao; in Pinyin: Daojiao) and philosophy (in Wade–Giles: Tao chia; in Pinyin: Daojia) referred to in English with the single term Daoism (a.k.a. Taoism). The concept of Dao was shared with Confucianism, with Chán and Zen Buddhism, and more broadly throughout East Asian philosophy and religion in general.
- Emanation from Dao:

- Wuji
  - Taiji
    - Yin-Yang (Liangyi)
      - Sixiang
        - Bagua

- The three Hun and seven Po ― the parts of the human soul which may depart causing illness and death.
- The Three Treasures ― the vital essence (jing), spirit (qi), and soul (shen) which must be refined to achieve longevity.
- Xian (Taoist immortals)
- Taoism and death

=== Virtues ===
- Three Treasures ― basic virtues in Taoism, including variations of "compassion", "frugality", and "humility". Arthur Waley described these Three Treasures as, "The three rules that formed the practical, political side of the author's teaching (1) abstention from aggressive war and capital punishment, (2) absolute simplicity of living, (3) refusal to assert active authority."
  - First of the Three Treasures: ci (Chinese: 慈; pinyin: cí; Wade–Giles: tz'u) – compassion, tenderness, love, mercy, kindness, gentleness, benevolence.
  - Second of the Three Treasures: jian (Chinese: 儉; pinyin: jiǎn; Wade–Giles: chien) – frugality, moderation, economy, restraint, be sparing.
  - Third of the Three Treasures: Bugan wei tianxia xian – "not dare to be first/ahead in the world", humility.

=== Ethics ===
- De (Te) ― virtue arising from the Way (Dao).
- Zhenren ― a "true man" or "true person"; someone who has cultivated perfection in De and attained the Dao.
- Precepts ― commandments, instructions, or orders intended as authoritative rules of action. Religious precepts are usually commands respecting moral conduct.
  - Five Precepts – constitute the basic code of ethics undertaken mainly by Taoist lay-cultivators. According to The Ultra Supreme Elder Lord's Scripture of Precepts, the five basic precepts are:
    - The first precept: No murdering
    - The second precept: No stealing
    - The third precept: No sexual misconduct
    - The fourth precept: No false speech
    - The fifth precept: No taking of intoxicants
  - Ten Precepts – classical rules of medieval Taoism as applied to practitioners attaining the rank of Disciple of Pure Faith. They first appeared in the Scripture on Setting the Will on Wisdom (DZ325). They were outlined in a short text that appears in Dunhuang manuscripts (DH31, 32). They are:
    - The first precept: Do not kill but always be mindful of the host of living beings
    - The second precept: Do not be lascivious or think depraved thoughts
    - The third precept: Do not steal or receive unrighteous wealth
    - The fourth precept: Do not cheat or misrepresent good and evil
    - The fifth precept: Do not get intoxicated but always think of pure conduct
    - The sixth precept: I will maintain harmony with my ancestors and family and never disregard my kin
    - The seventh precept: When I see someone do a good deed, I will support him with joy and delight
    - The eighth precept: When I see someone unfortunate, I will support him with dignity to recover good fortune
    - The ninth precept: When someone comes to do me harm, I will not harbor thoughts of revenge
    - The tenth precept: As long as all beings have not attained the Tao, I will not expect to do so myself

=== Deities in Taoism ===
==== Principle deities ====
- Hongjun Laozu
- Three Pure Ones
  - Yuanshi Tianzun
  - Lingbao Tianzun
  - Daode Tianzun
- Four Sovereigns
  - Yuhuang Dadi (Great Jade Emperor)
  - Zhongtian Ziwei Beiji Dadi (Great Emperor of the North Star in the Purple Forbidden enclosure at the center of Heaven)
  - Gouchen Dadi (Great Emperor of the Curved Array/Little Dipper)
  - Houtu Huang Diqi (Empress of the Earth)
- Three Great Emperor-Officials
- Xiwangmu (Queen Mother of the West)
- Dongwanggong (King Father of the East)
- Eight Immortals

==== Other deities ====
- Chang'e
- Three Sovereigns and Five Emperors
  - Yellow Emperor
- Guan Shengdi
- Li Hong

=== Taoist practices ===
- Taoist meditation
  - Zuowang
- Taoist alchemy
  - Neidan (internal alchemy)
    - Jing-Qi-Shen
    - Dantian
  - Waidan (external alchemy)
    - Five Minerals Powder
- Bugang
- Taoist diet
- Taoist sexual practices

== Taoist culture ==
- Taoist priest
- Taoist music
- Taoist art
  - Ink wash painting

=== Taoist martial arts and physical exercise ===
- Taijiquan
  - Taoist Tai Chi
- Daoyin ― Note: the "dao" (導) and "yin" (引) here are not the same Chinese words as ‘the Dao’ (道) and ‘Yin’ (阴) as in yin-yang.
- Qigong

=== Sacred places ===
- Grotto-heavens
- Sacred Mountains of China
  - Wudang Mountains
- Mount Penglai
- Mount Kunlun
- Taoist temple
  - White Cloud Temple (Baiyun Monastery)
  - Louguantai Temple
  - Cebu Taoist Temple
  - Taoist Temple (Hanford, California)

== History of Taoism ==
- History of Taoism
- The Religion of China: Confucianism and Taoism

== Variations of Taoism ==
=== Taoist schools ===
Taoist schools

- Wudoumi Taoism
- Tianshi Taoism
- Shangqing Taoism
- Lingbao Taoism
- Quanzhen Taoism (Longmen Taoism)
  - Dragon Gate Taoism
- Zhengyi Taoism
- Wuliu Taoism
- Yao Taoism

=== Taoism by region ===
- Taoism in Hong Kong
- Taoism in Japan
- Taoism in Korea
- Taoism in Malaysia
- Taoism in Singapore
- Taoism in Vietnam

== Taoist organizations ==
- Chinese Taoist Association
- Celestial Master
- Hong Kong Taoist Association
  - Hong Kong Taoist Association Tang Hin Memorial Secondary School
  - Hong Kong Taoist Association The Yuen Yuen Institute No.2 Secondary School
- Research Association of Laozi Taoist Culture
- Malaysian Consultative Council of Buddhism, Christianity, Hinduism, Sikhism and Taoism
- Taoist Tai Chi Society

== Influential Taoists ==
List of Taoists

- Chen Tuan
- Ge Hong
- Laozi
- Shan Tao
- Wang Liping
- Zhang Daoling
- Zhang Jue
- Zhang Zhong
- Zhuangzi

== Taoism in popular culture ==
- Jeon Woo-chi: The Taoist Wizard
- Lao Mountain Taoist
- Dudeism

== See also ==
- Outline of religion
- Daoism–Taoism romanization issue
