= Taoism in Hong Kong =

Religions in hong kong

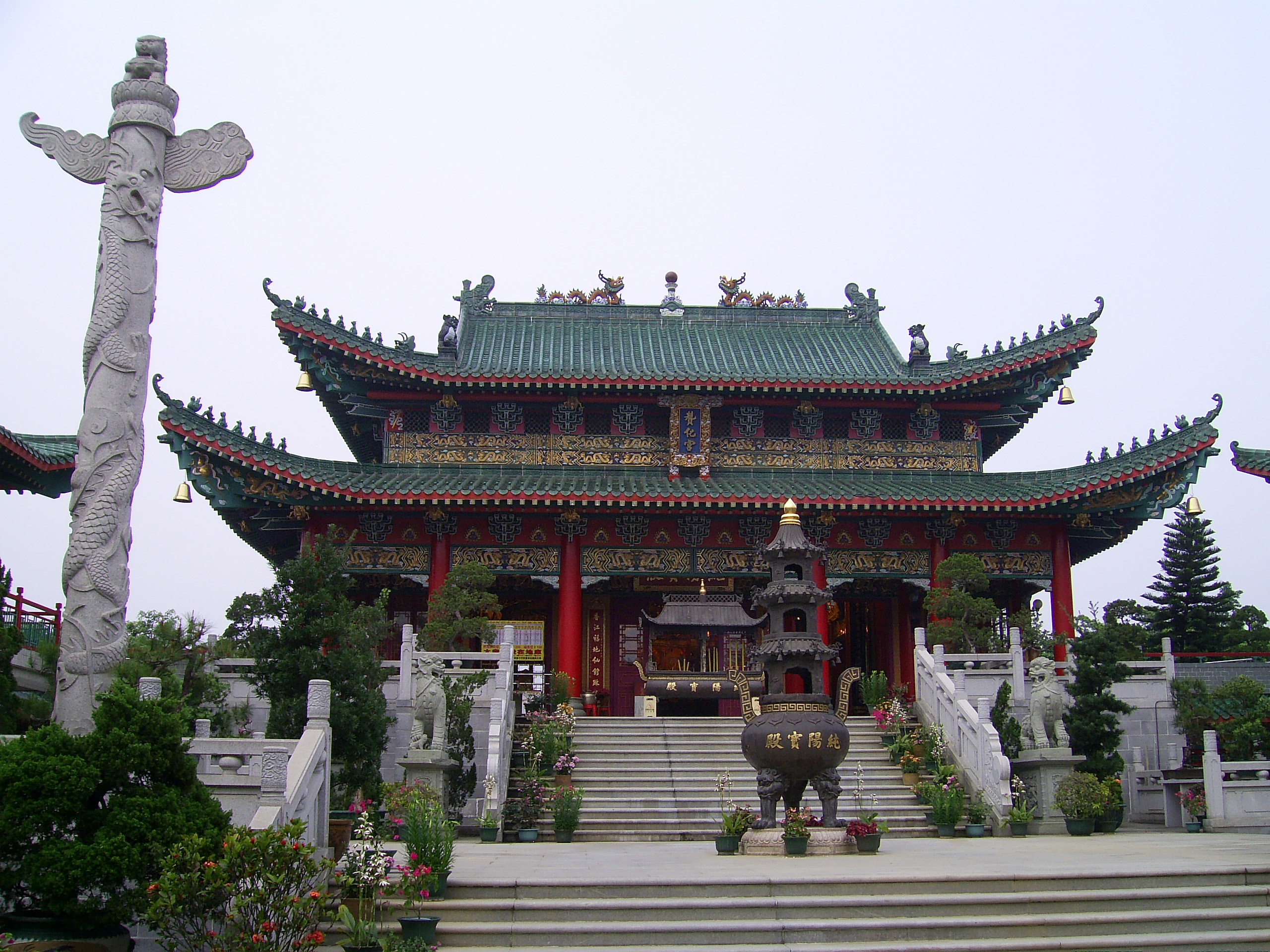
Main hall of the Wun Chuen Sin Koon, a Taoist temple in Hong Kong.

Taoism in Hong Kong is the religion of approximately 14% of the population. This figure did not include the large number of local population who are following Chinese folk religious traditions without indicating their religious affiliation.

Prominent local Taoist organizations include Ching Chung Koon, Fung Ying Seen Koon, Sik Sik Yuen, Yuen Yuen Institute. These Taoist organisations have significant contribution toward Hong Kong society through providing various type of welfare services like free clinics (both TCM & Western), elderly activity centres and elderly care homes. They have also contributed to Hong Kong's education system by setting up a number of kindergartens, primary and secondary schools in Hong Kong.

Ching Chung Koon has established the "Hong Kong Taoist College" in 1991 to promote Taoist education, printing Taoist publications and organising global Taoist conferences. The first 24 hours Taoist television channel was established by Fung Ying Seen Koon in 2004, the channel is also available online in 2006.

Local population, especially Chinese folk religionists often visit popular Taoist temples like Wong Tai Sin Temple, Che Kung Miu and Tin Hau temples during major festivals like Chinese New Year or the Deity's Birthday.

== See also ==
- Hong Kong Taoist Association
- Yuen Yuen Institute (圓玄學院)
- Ching Chung Koon (青松觀)
- Fung Ying Seen Koon (蓬瀛仙館)
- Sik Sik Yuen (嗇色園)
- Taai Ping Ching Jiu (太平清醮)
- Cheung Chau Bun Festival
- Kau chim & Jiaobei
- Papier-mache offering shops in Hong Kong
- Hong Kong Taoist Association Tang Hin Memorial Secondary School
- Hong Kong Taoist Association The Yuen Yuen Institute No.2 Secondary School
- Ho Fung College
- Ho Lap College
- Moy Lin-shin
- Chinese Temples Committee
