= John Chung Li =

Li Chung (1907-1982), or John Chung Li was an internationally renowned internal martial arts Master. He studied Liu He Ba Fa under Liang Zhi Peng in Hong Kong, where he taught the art for many years.

In 1968 he moved to Boston in the United States, where he founded his school, the Hwa-Yu T'ai Chi Health Institute in Chinatown. In 1980, Master Li chose Robert Xavier as his successor. Grand Master Li died in 1982.

Paul Dillon was a lineage heir to Master Li's Liu He Ba Fa Chuan art. Paul Dillon translated and annotated the Liuhebafa Five Character Secrets, which was later republished by YMAA Publishing.

Paul Dillon translated the "Five Word Song". This was attributed to Li Tung Fung, who inherited the art from its founder, the Taoist sage Chen Tuan (Chen Hsi I).

Master Li Chung did not choose Robert Xavier as his successor in 1980; Xavier was given the lineage from another student after Master Li died in 1982, so Robert Xavier is not a true lineage holder of Hwa YU Taichi.
