= Fung Ying Seen Koon =

Taoist temple and monastery in Hong Kong

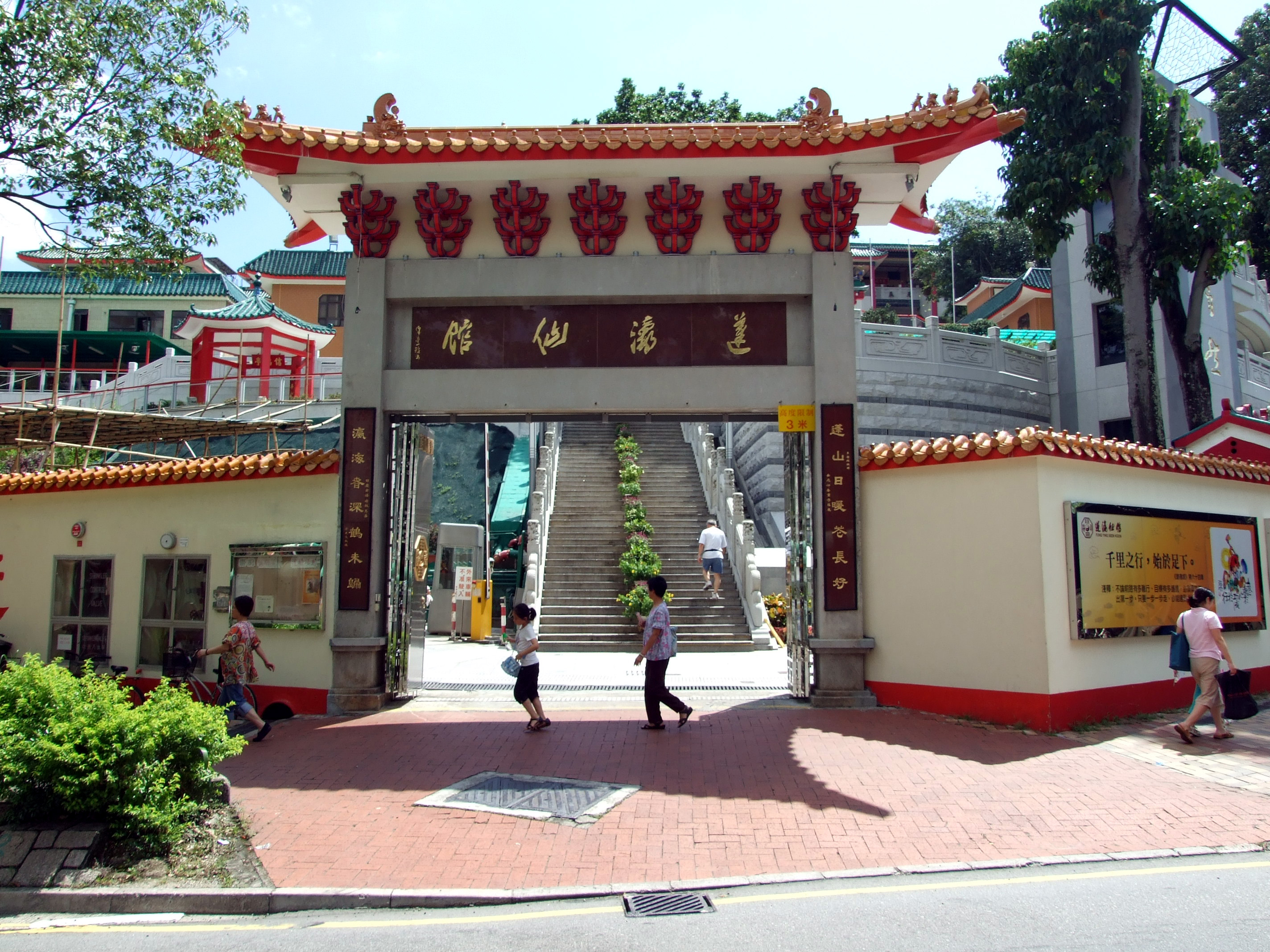
- Entrance of Fung Ying Seen Koon along Pak Wo Road

- Location in Hong Kong

Religion
- Affiliation: Taoism

Location
- Location: 66 Pak Wo Road, Fanling, New Territories, Hong Kong
- Interactive map of Fung Ying Seen Koon
- Coordinates: 22.490535°N 114.138347°E

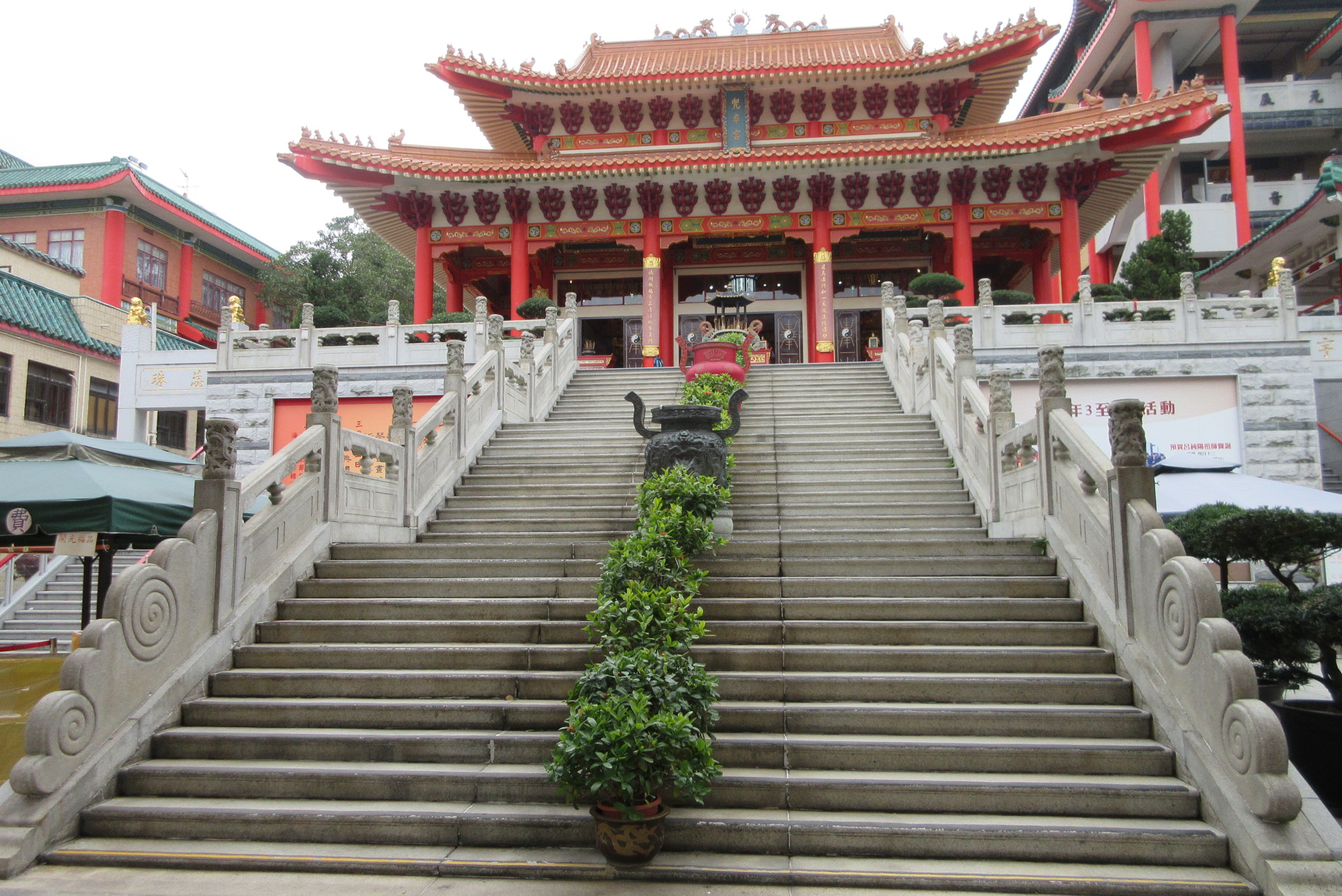
Fung Ying Seen Koon

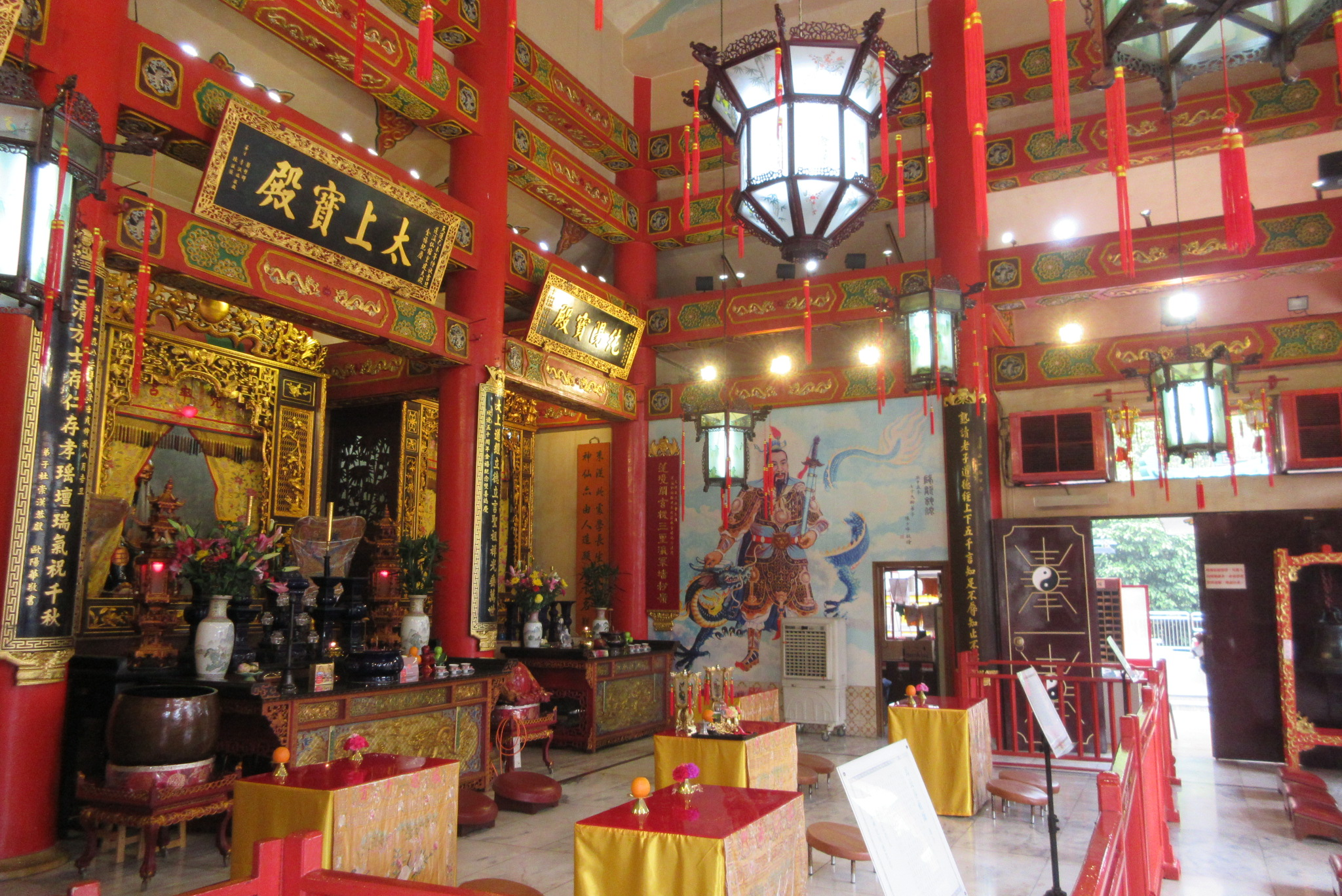
Fung Ying Seen Koon

Fung Ying Seen Koon (Chinese: 蓬瀛仙館; Jyutping: fung4 jing4 sin1 gun2) was founded in 1929 as an affiliate of the Quanzhen Longmen Lineage (全真龍門派) of Taoism. FYSK is a superb example of Taoist design and craftsmanship. It was named after the two fairy islands of Fung Lai and Ying Chau of the Bohai Sea. It Dominates the skyline from its commanding site on a hillside overlooking the New Territories town of Fanling in Hong Kong. Its massive orange-tiled double roof, built to traditional design and supported by stout red pillars of stone, catches the eyes immediately, inviting the visitor to step up to its entrance and inspect the many examples of artistic craftsmanship to be found within its grounds.

== Features ==
=== Grand Temple ===
The Grand Temple is for the worship of Taishang Laojun (太上老君), Lü Dongbin (呂洞賓) and Qiu Chuji (丘處機). The middle one is Laojun. Laojun is one of the three highest deities of Daoism. According to Daoist classics, Laojun manifested himself in the form of Laozi, the Great philosopher of ancient China, best known as the author of the Daodejing (道德經). Lü Dongbin is one of the Five Patriarchs (五祖) in the Quenzhen School. He is one of the earliest masters of the tradition of Internal alchemy (內丹). Qiu Chuji was a great disciple of Wang Chongyang (王重陽), the founder of Quanzhen School. He was also referred to as the founder of Longmen Sect.

=== Guanyin Temple ===
The Guanyin Temple was established to worship Guanyin (觀音大士). Guanyin is deity of mercy and compassion.

=== Yuen San Temple ===
The Yuen San Temple was established to worship Doumu (斗姆) and the sixty Great Generals of the Chinese sexagesimal cycle (六十太歲大將軍). Doumu is the mother of deities of the stars of the Northern Dipper (北斗). She is referred to as a deity of medicine, healing, fertility and nurture. The Chinese sexagesimal cycle corresponding to a person’s year of birth are considered to denote his or her fundamental destiny. The sixty Great Generals alternately govern and act as the patron deities.

=== The Colorful Sculpture of "Yellow Emperor Inquires After the Tao" ===
This painting depicts the Yellow Emperor's visit to the hermit Guangchengzi (廣成子) of Mt. Kongdong (崆峒山), who discovered the secrets of immortality and the Dao. The scene demonstrates that the legendary first emperor of China set the precedent for seeking advice from wise Daoist hermits.

=== The Carving of "The Scroll of Eighty-Seven Immortals" ===
The scroll depicts 87 immortals paying homage to the supreme deity. The picture is considered as a representative of China's best achievement in line drawing techniques of classical portraits. Xu Beihong (徐悲鴻, 1895-1953) attributed it to a 7th century painter Wu Daozi (吳道子) and even stamped a seal on it reading "Beihong's Life". The scroll is now in the collection of the Xu Beihong Memorial Museum.

=== Vegetarian canteen ===
The vegetarian canteen provides vegetarian food for tourists, disciples and the public. Most of the food is also vegan. On walking up the main stairs the General Office is on the left. Diagonally behind the office is a Yin and Yang carving. The restaurant is signposted in the corner past the Yin and Yang carving.

== Notable Projects ==
=== Tai Ping Kindergarten ===
Tai Ping Kindergarten was established in October 1989 to promote positive children education.

=== Taoist Orchestra ===
Fung Ying Seen Koon has set up the Taoist musical orchestra in July 1996, with the purpose to promote Taoist culture through traditional music.

=== Taoist TV Channel ===
The first 24 hours Taoist television channel was established by Fung Ying Seen Koon in 2004, the channel is also available online in 2006.

== Public transport ==
From Fanling station, take exit B. Follow signs in the subway for Fung Ying Seen Koon and Wo Hop Shek. The temple is then beside the subway exit.

== See also ==
- Quanzhen School
- Taoism in Hong Kong
- Hong Kong Taoist Association
- Yuen Yuen Institute
- Ching Chung Koon
