= List of Taoists =

List of Taoists or List of Daoists is a list of some historical figures in Taoism.

== Classical ==
- Laozi (601 BCE–531 BCE) (Founder of Philosophical Taoism)
- Wenzi (c. 5th century BCE)
- Lie Yukou (Liezi) (c. 400 BCE)
- Zhuang Zi (Chuang Tzu) (c. 4th century BCE)
- Guiguzi (c. 2nd century BCE)
- Yang Xiong (53 BCE–18)
- Maming Sheng (c. 100)
- Yin Changsheng (120–210)
- Wei Boyang (151–221)
- Ge Xuan (164–244)
- Zhang Jiao (d. 184)
- Gan Ji (d. 200)
- He Yan (195–249)
- Ji Kang (223–262)
- Zhang Daoling (Zhang Ling) (c. 2nd century)
- Zhongli Quan (c. 2nd century) (Legendary figure)
- Zhang Lu (d. 216)
- Wang Bi (226–249)
- Guo Xiang (Kuo Hsiang) (252–312)
- Fan Changsheng (d. 318)
- Bao Jing (d. 330)
- Wei Huacun (252–334)
- Ge Hong (284–364)
- Pao Ching-yen (c. 3rd century)
- Bao Gu (c. 4th century)
- Kou Qianzhi (365–448)
- Lu Xiujing (406–477)
- Ge Chaofu (c. 4th or 5th century)
- Tao Hongjing (456–536)
- Sun Simiao (d. 682)
- Li Bi (722–789)
- Lü Dongbin (c. 750–)
- Du Guangting (850–933)
- Chen Tuan (871–989)
- Wang Chongyang (1113–1170)
- Sun Bu'er (1119–1182)
- Wang Chuyi (1142–1217)
- Qiu Chuji (1148–1227)
- Zhang Sanfeng (b. 12th century) (Legendary figure)
- Zhang Sicheng (d. 1344)
- Zhu Quan (1378–1448)
- Zhang Guoxiang (d. 1611)
- Liu Yiming (1734–1821)

== Modern ==
- Hua Yanjun (1893–1950)
- Moy Lin-shin (1931–1998)
- Shi Zhouren (1934–2021)
- Ren Farong (1936–2021)
- Wang Liping (born 1949)
- Wu Chengzhen (born 1957)

== See also ==
- Taoism
- Daodejing
- Taoist schools
- List of Celestial Masters
