= Precept =

Important rule of action and behavior

A precept (from the Latin: præcipere, to teach) is traditionally defined as a commandment, instruction, or order intended as an authoritative rule of action.

In contemporary contexts, the term also has several other specific meanings in religion, law, and education.

== Religious law ==
In religion, precepts are usually commands respecting moral conduct.

=== Christianity ===
The term is encountered frequently in the Jewish and Christian Scriptures:

Thou hast commanded thy precepts to be kept diligently. O that my ways may be steadfast in keeping thy statutes!

— Psalm 119(118):4–5, RSV

The usage of precepts in the Revised Standard Version of the Bible corresponds with that of the Hebrew Bible. The Septuagint (Samuel Rengster edition) has Greek entolas, which, too, may be rendered with precepts.

==== Latin Catholicism ====
The Latin Church of the Catholic Church's canon law, which is based on Roman Law, makes a distinction between precept and law in Canon 49:

A singular precept is a decree which directly and legitimately enjoins a specific person or persons to do or omit something, especially in order to urge the observance of law.

In Catholicism, the "Commandments of the Church" may also be called "Precepts of the Church".

Holy days of obligation may also be known simply as precepts.

=== Buddhism ===
In Buddhism, the fundamental code of ethics is known as the Five Precepts (Pañcaśīla in Sanskrit, or Pañcasīla in Pāli), practiced by laypeople, either for a given period of time or for a lifetime. The precepts also relate to right speech, action and livelihood aspects of the Noble Eightfold Path, which is essential in Buddhist practices. There are other levels of precepts, varying amongst traditions. In Theravadin tradition, there are Eight Precepts, Ten Precepts, and the Patimokkha. Eight Precepts are a more rigorous practice for laypeople. Ten Precepts are the training rules for samaneras and samaneris, novice monks and nuns, respectively. The Patimokkha is the basic Theravada code of monastic discipline, consisting of 227 rules for monks, (bhikkhus) and 311 rules for nuns (bhikkhunis).

== Secular law ==
In secular law, a precept is a command in writing; a species of writ issued from a court or other legal authority. It is now chiefly used of an order demanding payment (in the UK, for example, the term is applied by local precepting authorities as part of the Council Tax system). The Latin form praecipe (i.e., to enjoin, command) is used of the note of instructions delivered by a plaintiff or his lawyer to be filed by the officer of the court, giving the names of the plaintiff and defendant.

== Higher education ==
Princeton University uses the term precept to describe what many other universities refer to as recitations: large classes are often divided into several smaller discussion sections called precepts, which are led by the professor or graduate teaching assistants. Precepts usually meet once a week as a supplement to the lectures which demands more active engagement of students.

== See also ==
- Five precepts (Taoism)
- Ten precepts (Taoism)
- Preceptor

== Bibliography ==
- Article entolē in Exegetical Dictionary of the New Testament, H. Balz and G. Schneider (ed.), Edinburgh 1990, Vol. I, pp. 459–60, which also cites sources for a discussion of the term's distinction from Greek nomos/"law".
- The Code of Canon Law, 1983, in the English translation prepared by the Canon Law Society of Great Britain and Ireland
- The Oxford English Dictionary lists the origin of precept as from the Latin roots of pre-septum. Thus precept is a pre coming-together/closure.
