= Liang Zipeng =

Hong Kong martial artist

Liang Zipeng 梁子鵬
- Born: 1900
- Died: 1974 (aged 73–74)
- Style: Neijia - Internal Martial Arts; Yiquan; Liuhebafa tai chi
- Teacher: Wu Yihui

Other information
- Notable students: Moy Lin-shin, Sun Di, C.S. Tang, Li Yingang

Liang Zipeng (Chinese: 梁子鵬; pinyin: Liáng Zǐpéng; Jyutping: loeng^{4} zi^{2} paang^{4}; 1900–1974) is a noted Liuhebafa Master from China who went to Hong Kong in 1946. He was an instructor in Eagle Claw, Liuhebafa, tai chi, Baguazhang, Yiquan, Xingyiquan and other arts.

Liang Zipeng studied Liuhebafa with a student of Wu Yihui named Li Dao Li for six years during the World War. While Wu Yihui returned to Shanghai in 1945 and restarted his classes, Liang Zipeng was recommended by Li Dao Li to teach. This was the account of Li's son.

Although one of the 25 a recognized student of Wu Yihui, Liang Zipeng only studied the first half of the Liuhebafa public form called "Building the Foundations" from Wu Yihui, and created his own personal second half from knowledge of other styles, thus the difference in his Liuhebafa from the mainstream.} Liang Zipeng's Liuhebafa form can be seen as being mostly influenced by Baguazhang with influences from tai chi, Yiquan and Xingyiquan.

Liang learned Yiquan in Shanghai from Dr Yu Pengxi, a student of Wang Xiangzhai, the Founder of Yiquan. Liang Zipeng's Yiquan style was called Southern Yiquan.

Liang learnt Jiang Style Baguazhang from Jiang Rongqiao at the Chin Woo Athletic Association.

Liang learned Eagle Claw under Chen Zi Ching
