= Jiang-style baguazhang =

Jiang Style Baguazhang
- Hardness: Internal (neijia)
- Country of origin: China
- Creator: Jiang Rongqiao
- Famous practitioners: Sha Guozheng
- Parenthood: Baguazhang (Cheng Style Baguazhang), Chen-style taijiquan, Xingyiquan, Mizongyi, Liuhebafa, Wudang sword
- Olympic sport: No

Jiang Style Baguazhang (Chinese: 姜氏八卦掌; pinyin: Jiāng Shì Bāguàzhǎng) is a style of Baguazhang developed by Jiang Rongqiao. It is a type of Neijia.

== Influences ==
Zhang Zhaodong appears to have been the dominant influence on this style, but Jiang Rongqiao had many other influences. Jiang started his training as a student of the Shaolin Kung Fu art of Mizongquan with his father, Jiang Fatai. He later studied more formally with his uncle, Chen Yushan. Jiang also studied Chen-style taijiquan and Wudang Sword. Eventually, Jiang became a formal student of Zhang Zhaodong, who had studied with both Dong Haichuan and Liu Qilan. Jiang Rongqiao also studied with Li Cunyi, a close associate of Zhang Zhaodong. Li Cunyi had been a student of Dong Haichuan and Liu Qilan. While it is said that Zhang and Li were students of Dong Haichuan, they were most likely taught by their friend Cheng Tinghua because Dong Haichuan was so much older. While Jiang did not become a formal disciple of Li, Li Cunyi was clearly a significant influence on Jiang.
