= Yunmen Mountain (Shandong) =

Mountain in Shandong, China

- Location within China

Highest point
- Elevation: 250 m (820 ft)
- Coordinates: 36°39′03″N 118°27′53″E

Naming
- Language of name: Chinese
- Pronunciation: Yúnménshān

Yunmen Mountain (Chinese: 云门山; pinyin: Yúnmén Shān; lit. 'Cloud-gate Mountain') is a mountain located in the town of Qingzhou, Weifang City, Shandong, China. It has religious significance for Taoism and Buddhism.

The name Yunmen Mountain derives from a natural opening near its summit through which clouds pass during the summer and autumn. The mountain is located approximately 2.5 kilometres south of Qingzhou's urban area. It is known for its cliffside inscriptions, Buddhist grottoes and stone sculptures, which form an important part of the area's historical and religious heritage.

== Buddhist Grottoes ==
The southern side of Yunmen Mountain contains five Buddhist grottoes and niches with a reported total of 272 statues. These include representations of Amitābha Buddha, Avalokiteśvara and Mahāsthāmaprāpta. Inscriptions associated with the sculptures record dates from the Sui dynasty, including 590 and 602, while a stone inscription in the fifth grotto records the year 731 during the Tang dynasty.

=== Taoist heritage ===
Yunmen Mountain also contains Taoist imagery and cultural relics. Its northern side contains Taoist sculptures associated with Wanchun Cave and Chen Tuan, as well as a statue of Ma Danyang, associated with the Quanzhen tradition of Taoism. The mountain is also noted for its cliff inscriptions, including a large Chinese character meaning “longevity” (寿), carved in 1560 during the Ming dynasty.
