= Ten precepts =

Ten Precepts may refer to:

- Ten precepts (Buddhism)
- Ten precepts (Taoism)
