= Gan Ji =

Chinese Taoist priest (died 200)

Yu Ji 于吉
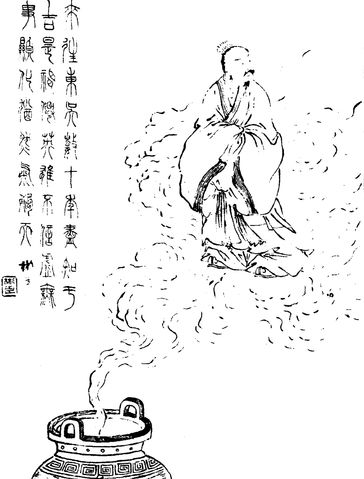
- A Qing dynasty illustration of Gan Ji
- Born: Unknown; Linyi, Shandong
- Died: 200
- Other name: Gan Ji (干吉)
- Occupation: Taoist priest

Gan Ji (died 200), rendered also as Yu Ji, was a Taoist priest who lived during the late Eastern Han dynasty of China. As a Taoist clergy, Gan Ji helped to cure the diseases of the people and saved many lives. He was widely respected in Wu County and Kuaiji, causing Sun Ce to be jealous of his fame and reputation among the locals. He was eventually executed by Sun Ce under the pretext of deceiving the public.

== Life ==
Gan Ji was born in Langya Commandery (琅琊郡, present-day southeastern Shandong). He first lived further in the east before travelling to Wu County and Kuaiji. When he arrived, he helped the locals with harvest, promoted Taoist culture by reading texts and burning incense. Furthermore, he also made talismans to treat diseases among the common people. Therefore, he became popular with the residents of Wu and Kuaiji. Many joined him to become his disciples. During a meeting, when Sun Ce gathered his officers and officials at the top of the county's tower. They noticed that Gan Ji was walking by the road in a splendid attire while carrying a small pouch in his hand. Seeing him, around two-thirds of Sun Ce's retainers left the tower to pay their respect to Gan Ji. Although those in charge of the assembly tried to, they couldn't stop them. Sun Ce was furious and imprisoned Gan Ji.

The people who served as Gan Ji's disciples sent their wives to plead for his case with Sun Ce's mother and saved him. Lady Wu told her son: "Master Gan assists the army and provides good fortune. He heals and saves the officers and soldiers; do not kill him." However, Sun Ce answered: "This man is a sorcerer who can deceive and confuse the masses. Because of him, the officers stopped caring for the rules between a sovereign and his ministers. Going as far as to ignore me to pay their respect to him. He must be killed."

When Sun Ce's officers heard about his decision to execute Gan Ji. They also sent letters to explain the situation and pleaded to save his life. Sun Ce told them: "In the past, Zhang Jin served as the Governor of Jiao Province yet he abandoned the common teaching, abolished the ancestral customs and laws so he could promote the Tao's evil precepts. Proclaiming it was to help others yet in the end he was killed by the southerners. This is the just result of his actions. All of you do not understand this. Now Gan Ji is already a dead man, don't waste paper and brush for this."

Thereafter, Sun Ce beheaded Gan Ji and had his head hung in the market. However, the disciples of Gan Ji didn't believe that he was dead, only that his soul left his body. They would continue to offer sacrifices to him and promote his teachings.

According to the Book of Later Han, during the reign of Emperor Shun of Han (r. 125–144), Gong Chong (宮崇), one of Gan Ji's disciples, submitted the Taiping Qingling Shu (太平清領書) to the emperor; although there is no certitude that this is the same Gan Ji.

== In Romance of the Three Kingdoms ==
Some believe that the character Yu Ji (于吉) in the 14th-century historical novel Romance of the Three Kingdoms is a misspelling of Gan Ji. In the novel, Yu Ji wandered around the Jiangdong region, chatting with soldiers and civilians, making everyone believe that he was a magician and healer. The warlord of Jiangdong, Sun Ce, heard of Yu Ji's magic and grew suspicious of him, thinking that he was casting spells on people. Sun Ce accused Yu Ji of sorcery and had him executed after Yu Ji stated that he cured people of diseases for free. However, Yu Ji's spirit returned to haunt Sun Ce and eventually caused him to die from shock.

== In popular culture ==
In the video games Dynasty Warriors 5 and 7, there is a stage based on Sun Ce's confrontation with Yu Ji, a fictional event. In the stage Sun Ce has to fight Yu Ji clones, as well as a Da Qiao and Sun Jian clone.

The 1983 Hong Kong film The Weird Man by the Shaw Brothers Studio is loosely based on the story of Yu Ji and Sun Ce. Yu Ji was put to death by Sun Ce and he later comes back as a ghost and wreaks havoc on Sun Ce for revenge by possessing his army and his wife. He also helped Sun Ce kill Xu Gong while killing Sun Ce in the process. In this film, he is seen as the hero while Sun Ce is portrayed as the anti-hero. The Weird Man was remade in 1993 as Ninja in Ancient China which also combined some concepts from another Shaw Brothers movie the Five Elements Ninjas.

A fictionalized version of Yu Ji appears as the central antagonist in the 2023 video game Wo Long: Fallen Dynasty.

== See also ==
- Taipingjing
- List of Taoists
- Lists of people of the Three Kingdoms
