= Taoist tai chi =

Type of tai chi

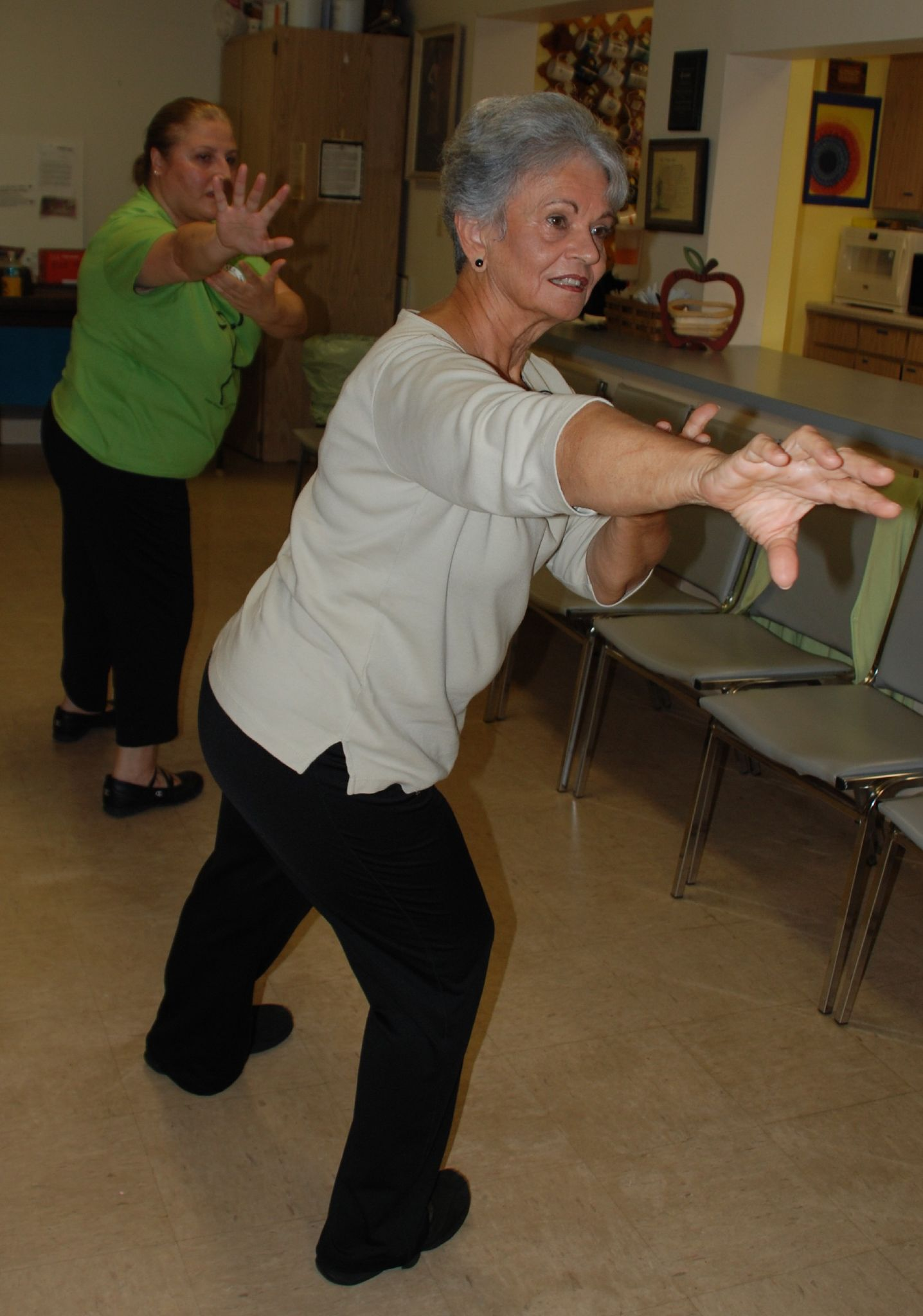
Two Taoist tai chi practitioners performing the movement Wave Hands like Clouds (or Cloud Hands)

Taoist tai chi is a form of tai chi which is taught in more than 25 countries by the non-profit International Taoist Tai Chi Society and associated national Taoist Tai Chi societies. It is a modified form of Yang-style tai chi developed by Taoist monk Moy Lin-shin in Toronto, Ontario, Canada. Moy incorporated principles of Liuhebafa and other internal arts to increase the health benefits of practising the form.

== Health benefits ==
=== Tai chi in general ===
Tai chi generally provides health benefits. In all the forms of tai chi there are movements that involve briefly standing on one leg, which may improve balance; circular movements of the shoulders and wrists which improve suppleness and circulation; learning the sequence of the set movements may improve cognitive function such as concentration; the social atmosphere can sometimes forge friendships and alleviate loneliness and anxiety; and the exercise itself can boost a person's mood and alleviate depression.

All forms of tai chi have been noted by YK Chen as regulating body weight, improving cognitive, lung, digestive and heart functioning as well as improving skin tone and bone structure.

Research on tai chi in general, carried out at the University of Toronto by Dahong Zhou, MD, shows that tai chi provides moderate exercise, equal to brisk walking. Zhou also notes that tai chi in general reduces stress levels and emotional problems while improving "concentration, attention, composure, self confidence, and self control". Zhou indicates that tai chi generally reduces hypertension, relieves chronic headaches, dizziness and insomnia, has benefits for people suffering with mild arthritis and rheumatism, improves breathing and blood circulation and is "an excellent exercise for the mind." His research shows that due to the low intensity of most forms of tai chi, that as an exercise regimen it does not lead to fatigue or stress.

=== Taoist tai chi ===
The health claims made for Taoist tai chi by the Taoist Tai Chi Society are generally similar to those made for all forms of tai chi.

In common with other forms of tai chi, the society says that for beginners tai chi starts out as primarily an external exercise, but for more advanced students it becomes more internal, exercising the internal organs and mind as well as the frame and muscles. Early in learning the tai chi set students may notice that the form strengthens the larger muscle groups in the legs, arms and back. According to the Taoist Tai Chi Society, the stretching aspects of the form improves the functioning of the joints, tendons and ligaments by taking them through their full range of motion. This can improve flexibility and reduce age-related deterioration.

The Taoist Tai Chi Society claims that later in their training students note increased mobility in the spine and that the form restores proper alignment of the spine with the shoulders and pelvis through the spinal stretches and rotations that are built into the set. Additionally the society claims that the form stimulates the spinal nerves, providing a balancing effect on the nervous system. Later on in practice the student may find that the set will exercise the internal organs, possibly resulting in increased circulation, digestion and elimination. The society claims that the set strengthens the cardiovascular system, improves physical conditioning, decreases fatigue and improves endurance.

Many of the health benefits claimed are related to the relaxation aspects of the Taoist tai chi set. The long stretches in the set may reduce tension at a muscular level and the slow pace of the set can create both mental and physical relaxation. The society claims that by relaxing the mind during tai chi the brain requires less blood and nutrients and that this allows the rest of the body to make use of these. This all may act to calm the heart and mind, while possibly improving strength and reducing overall stress.

Philosophically, the tai chi taught by the Taoist Tai Chi Society is stated to be taught from a belief that people are innately good but that the nature of society causes people to become self-centred and to acquire bad habits. The aim of the training is to "eliminate these weaknesses so that our original nature of goodness can again shine brightly, guiding our thoughts and actions." To achieve this the society promotes the virtues of compassion and service to others, through students becoming instructors who then teach tai chi to new students without any personal gain. In some cases, tai chi may be taught by the society as an integrated meditation art as well as an exercise program.

The Taoist Tai Chi Society sums up the challenges:

It is not easy to achieve the state of emptiness or stillness in the midst of today’s busy and complex lifestyle. To achieve stillness and yet be involved and active is even more difficult. Practicing Taoist Tai Chi fosters stillness since the focused concentration required to do the Tai Chi set (and developed in learning it) occupies the mind, drawing it away from daily worries and tensions. Learning to quiet the mind, even while moving through the Tai Chi set, lays a foundation for integrating the principle of stillness—and the recognition of our original nature—into our daily lives.

== Form principles ==
Taoist tai chi has several principles of movement that are meant to be a part of every posture, these principles are what defines Taoist tai chi as a unique tai chi practice. Several of these are attributes espoused by many non-Society teachers, but are expressed somewhat differently than is traditional within Taoist tai chi. Here is a brief description.

45 Degree Angle Step"
the principle of Straight/45 refers to the desired degree of the feet in relation to one another, usually with the front foot Straight forward and the back foot (left or right) at 45 degrees outward. This is meant to aid in squaring the hips.
Positioning the Front Knee
The knee should not extend beyond the toes to prevent injury.
"Squaring the hips"
at the end/forward position of a movement (such as Single Whip) the hips of a practitioner should be square or facing completely forward and in line with the front or "Straight" foot. Conversely, when at the rollback or beginning of a posture the hips should be in line with the back or "45" foot. The professed health benefit of this is that it facilitates a turning/stretching of the spine and an opening of the pelvic region (specifically the hip joint).
Weight placement/Balance
there should be a straight line from the top of the head to the heel of the rear foot in all forward positions.

The head is above the shoulders, the shoulders over the waist and hips, the hips over the knees and feet, thus balance is kept.

"Equal and Opposite Forces"
In Taoist tai chi a push with one hand is balanced with an equal push with the other hand.

== Foundation exercises ==
In addition to the full 108 Taoist tai chi set, students are taught a unique group of cyclical foundation exercises (基本功, jī běn gōng) that focus on the joints, called "the jongs" (from 站桩, zhàn zhuāng). Most of these exercises, either in their form or execution, are completely unique to Taoist tai chi. These exercises are not only used as preliminaries to the form, they are espoused as being the basic elements that provide health benefit in the varying movements of Taoist tai chi. Instructors often explain postures by referring to a foundation exercise. The 108 forms shown below were originally developed by Yang Chengfu, published in 1931 and 1934 and are commonly referred to as traditional Yang-style tai chi.

The main foundations include:

- A basic forearm rotation: the forearms are held up and forward and rotate in and out. The hands are located in front of the left and right meridian. The elbows are stationary.
- A rotation of the arms in front of the body: making a circular motion with the hands: where one pushes away the other pulls in. The thumbs move from the central axis of the body. It is mainly an upper body stretch in which the arms move outward from the center and then back.
- Dan Yu (spine stretching) (from 蹲腰, dūn yāo). A squatting exercise meant to work primarily the pelvic region, the legs and the lower back. Fifty or more repetitions may be performed in advanced classes. The feet are placed in a stance wider than the shoulders. When squatting the knees move in the direction of the feet.
- Tor Yu (spine turning) (from 拖腰, tuō yāo). The feet are at the typical "Straight/45" position, minding the "in-stepping/out-stepping". The pelvis alternates between weight over the front "Straight" and the back "45" foot. Thus the trunk moves following the pelvis. The hands follow the body and cross in front of the lower dantian when the body moves backward to the '45 back" position, and then uncross and push away towards the "Straight front" position leading the trunk. For the outside observer it seems that the hands make a circular motion, however they don't for the practitioner. In addition to its purported health benefits this exercise is particularly similar to the Silk reeling of other styles in that it helps develop the theory of movement present in all of Taoist tai chi.
- An arm separation such as in kicks: the arms start crossed in front of the body, move sideways, backward and down, and forward up again with the hands crossed on the centerline in front of the chest.
- A variant of the Wave Hands like Clouds move.
- Stationary stance versions of the posture "Snake Creeps Low", in which the practitioner may come to a full standing position in between left and right sides of the posture.
- Sometimes repetitions of various other movements (e.g., Brush Knee, Go Back to Ward Off Monkey, or Flying at a Slant) but usually movements that lend themselves to repetition.

== Form list ==
The 108 movements of the Taoist tai chi set are:

| 1. Opening of tai chi; 2. Left Grasp Bird's Tail; 3. Grasp Bird's Tail; 4. Single Whip; 5. Step Up and Raise Hands; 6. White Stork Spreads Wings; 7. Brush Knee (left); 8. Strum the Pei Pa; 9. Brush Knee and Twist Step (left); 10. Brush Knee and Twist Step (right); 11. Brush Knee (left); 12. Strum the Pei Pa; 13. Brush Knee and Twist Step (left); 14. Chop with Fist; 15. Step Up, Deflect, Parry, Punch; 16. Appear to Close Entrance; 17. Cross Hands; 18. Carry Tiger to Mountain; 19. Whip Out Diagonally; 20. Fist Under Elbow; 21. Go Back to Ward Off Monkey (right); 22. Go Back to Ward Off Monkey (left); 23. Go Back to Ward Off Monkey (right); 24. Flying at a Slant; 25. Step Up and Raise Hands; 26. White Stork Spreads Wings; 27. Brush Knee (left); 28. Push Needle to Sea Bottom; 29. Fan Penetrates through the Back; 30. Turn and Chop with Fist; 31. Step Up, Deflect, Parry, Punch; 32. Step Up to Grasp Bird's Tail; 33. Single Whip; 34. Move Hands Like Clouds (five times); 35. Single Whip; 36. Reach Up to Pat Horse; 37. Separate Foot to Right; 38. Separate Foot to Left; 39. Turn and Kick; 40. Brush Knee and Twist Step (left); 41. Brush Knee and Twist Step (right); 42. Step Up and Punch; 43. Turn and Chop with Fist; 44. Step Up, Deflect, Parry, Punch; 45. Right Foot Kick; 46. Hit Tiger at Left; 47. Hit Tiger at Right; 48. Right Foot Kick; 49. Strike Ears with Fists; 50. Left Foot Kick; 51. Turn and Kick; 52. Chop with Fist; 53. Step Up, Deflect, Parry, Punch; 54. Appear to Close Entrance | 55. Cross Hands; 56. Carry Tiger to Mountain; 57. Whip Out Horizontally; 58. Parting Wild Horse's Mane (right); 59. Parting Wild Horse's Mane (left); 60. Parting Wild Horse's Mane (right); 61. Parting Wild Horse's Mane (left); 62. Parting Wild Horse's Mane (right); 63. Left Grasp Bird's Tail; 64. Step Up to Grasp Bird's Tail; 65. Single Whip; 66. Fair Lady Works Shuttles (left); 67. Fair Lady Works Shuttles (right); 68. Fair Lady Works Shuttles (left); 69. Fair Lady Works Shuttles (right); 70. Left Grasp Bird's Tail; 71. Step Up to Grasp Bird's Tail; 72. Single Whip; 73. Move Hands Like Clouds (seven times); 74. Single Whip; 75. Creeping Low Like a Snake; 76. Golden Cock Stands on One Leg (left); 77. Golden Cock Stands on One Leg (right); 78. Go Back to Ward Off Monkey (right); 79. Go Back to Ward Off Monkey (left); 80. Flying at a Slant; 81. Step Up and Raise Hands; 82. White Stork Spreads Wings; 83. Brush Knee (left); 84. Push Needle to Sea Bottom; 85. Fan Penetrates through the Back; 86. White Snake Turns and Puts Out Tongue; 87. Step Up, Deflect, Parry, Punch; 88. Step Up to Grasp Bird's Tail; 89. Single Whip; 90. Move Hands Like Clouds (three times); 91. Single Whip; 92. Reach Up to Pat Horse; 93. Cross Hands to Penetrate; 94. Turn and Kick; 95. Chop with Fist; 96. Brush Knee and Punch; 97. Step Up to Grasp Bird's Tail; 98. Single Whip; 99. Creeping Low Like a Snake; 100. Step Up to Seven Stars; 101. Retreat to Ride Tiger; 102. Turn Around to Sweep Lotus; 103. Draw Bow to Shoot Tiger; 104. Chop with Fist; 105. Step Up, Deflect, Parry, Punch; 106. Appear to Close Entrance; 107. Cross Hands; 108. Closing of tai chi |
