= Moy Lin-shin =

Taoist monk, teacher and tai chi instructor

Moy Linshin 梅連羨
- Born: 1931, Guangdong, China
- Died: 1998, Toronto, Canada
- Style: Neijia; Tai chi Liuhebafa; Xingyiquan; Taoist Qigong
- Teachers: Yang Liu; Liang Zipeng; Sun Di
- Rank: Founder of Taoist Tai Chi

Moy Lin-shin (Chinese: 梅連羨; pinyin: Méi Liánxiàn) (1931 in Taishan county, Guangdong – June 6, 1998, Toronto, Ontario, Canada) was a Taoist monk, teacher and tai chi instructor who founded the Taoist Tai Chi Society, the Fung Loy Kok Institute of Taoism and the Gei Pang Lok Hup Academy.

== Early life ==
As a sickly youth, Moy was sent to a Taoist monastery. There he was trained in the teachings of the Earlier Heaven Wu-chi sect of the Hua Shan School of Taoism and regained his health. Moy reported that he studied the religious and philosophical side of Taoism and that he had acquired knowledge and skills in Chinese martial arts.

Ahead of the Communist Revolution of 1949, Moy moved to Hong Kong. There he joined the Yuen Yuen Institute, in Tsuen Wan district in the New Territories, continued his education and became a Taoist monk.

The Yuen Yuen Institute was established in 1950 by monks from Sanyuan Gong (Three Originals Palace) in Guangzhou, Guangdong province, which traces its lineage to the Longmen (Dragon Gate) sect of Quanzhen (Complete Perfection) Taoism. The Yuen Yuen Institute is dedicated to Taoism, Buddhism and Confucianism. In 1968, Moy co-founded, together with Taoist Masters Mui Ming-to and Tang Yuen Mei, the temple for the Fung Loy Kok Institute of Taoism (FLK; Penglai ge, 蓬萊閣) on the grounds of the Yuen Yuen Institute.

In addition to his studies and education in Taoism, Moy Lin-shin learned a range of internal martial arts including liuhebafa, tai chi, xingyiquan, baguazhang and Taoist qigong. Moy's main teacher was Yang Liu (杨六; Cantonese: Yeung Luk), a Daoist hermit teaching qigong and tai chi. Moy was the most senior disciple (of only 5 disciples) of Yang Liu. The second disciple was Ng Pak Shing, who opened a school in Canada after Moy died but has gone back to China since. Another one of Moy's main teachers in Hong Kong was Liang Zipeng, an instructor in liuhebafa and other arts, who was in turn a student of Wu Yihui. Moy was taught liuhebafa in Hong Kong by Liang Zipeng. Moy also trained in Hong Kong with Sun Di, a fellow student of Liang Zipeng, who Moy said had developed skills in xingyiquan and Pushing hands. After 1975, Moy would travel back to Hong Kong on an annual basis to keep learning from Yang Liu and Sun Di. He would bring some of his senior students along on occasion.

== Move to Canada ==
Moy went overseas with a mission of spreading the understanding of Taoism and its practices. After some travel, he settled in Montreal, Quebec, Canada, and in 1970 began teaching a small group of dedicated students. In those early days, Moy taught both the health and martial arts aspects of tai chi. Upon moving to one of Toronto's "Chinatowns" a few years later, he changed his focus, emphasising mainly the health promoting and personal development aspects of tai chi, although Moy still did place strong emphasis on tai chi push hands practice and sometimes demonstrated other self-defense aspects of tai chi as well.

Moy started with a standard Yang-style tai chi form, also saying he had mixed in elements of other internal arts, and taught it to condition students to learn Lok Hup Ba Fa later. Moy called this modified form Taoist Tai Chi. Moy emphasized the non-competitive nature of his style of teaching and of the form. A teacher of Taoist Tai Chi is asked to conform to and live by what Moy called, "Eight Heavenly Virtues":

- Sense of Shame
- Honor
- Sacrifice
- Propriety
- Trustworthiness
- Dedication
- Sibling Harmony
- Filial piety

In accordance with these virtues, Taoist Tai Chi is a form that is taught by volunteers.

== Organizations ==
To promote his understanding of the Taoist foundations of tai chi and to facilitate understanding between eastern and western cultures, Moy helped to set up a number of organizations. Initially, he established the Toronto Tai Chi Association, which, after Taoist Tai Chi chapters were formed across Canada, became the Taoist Tai Chi Society (道教太極拳社) of Canada. After expansion into the United States and later into Europe, New Zealand and Australia the International Taoist Tai Chi Society was established in 1990.

In 1981 Moy Lin-shin and Mui Ming-to established a Canadian branch of the Hong Kong-based Fung Loy Kok Institute of Taoism, which became the religious arm of the Taoist Tai Chi Society. This occurred with the opening of a Fung Loy Kok high shrine at the Society's Bathurst Street location in Toronto. They subsequently established other branches of Fung Loy Kok in Canada, Australia, New Zealand, and the United States. This Institute maintains altars to the Taoist deities, i.e., the Jade Emperor, Guanyin (one of the female Bodhisattvas in Buddhism), and Lü Dongbin (one of the eight Taoist "Transcendants", who became Immortals via "Inner Alchemy").

Initially, Moy concentrated on teaching just tai chi forms and later emphasized other internal arts. In 1988 Moy established the Gei Pang Lok Hup Academy, which is dedicated to the memory of his teacher Liang Zipeng. It was established with the intent to teach the internal martial arts other than tai chi, mainly liuhebafa. Over the years, Moy Linshin not only taught tai chi and liuhebafa but also Taoist meditation, yiquan, zhan zhuang and qigong, a hybrid xingyiquan-yiquan form from Sun Di, Yang-style tai chi sword and Yang-style tai chi saber, a long list of Foundation exercises (Jibengong) and some baguazhang.

== The organizations since his death ==
Since the death of Moy Lin-shin in 1998, the three organizations he founded have been amalgamated, with the Fung Loy Kok Institute of Taoism as the main organization and the Taoist Tai Chi Society and the Gei Pang Lok Hup Academy as part of the Institute. This brought together the financial and administrative management of the three organizations.

In order to broaden the emphasis on health and vitality, the Taoist Tai Chi Health Recovery Centre was established in 1997 near Toronto, at Orangeville, Ontario. On the same grounds a Taoist Cultivation Centre was built in 2005–2006.

== Criticism ==
Moy Lin Shin has been criticized by one Tai Chi practitioner for being unqualified and for teaching a version of tai chi that is "not generally recognised as an authentic style of tai chi" although that same critic admitted that his efforts "did a great deal to introduce thousands to tai chi".
