= Taoist Tai Chi Society =

Organization that promotes and teaches tai chi

- Abbreviation: TTCS
- Type: Society
- Legal status: active
- Purpose: advocate and public voice, educator and network
- Headquarters: Toronto, Ontario, Canada
- Region served: International
- Official language: English, French
- Website: https://www.taoisttaichi.org/ ; http://www.taoist.org/

The International Taoist Tai Chi Society (Chinese: 國際道家太極拳社) is an umbrella organization for the governance of its member associations around the world, which are dedicated to the teaching of Taoist Tai Chi. As of 2007, the organization had 40,000 members, including 15,000 in Canada, and was present in 26 countries. Since 2010 the Society refers to Taoist Tai Chi as Taoist Tai Chi internal arts of health.

== Society aims and objectives ==
The International Taoist Tai Chi Society has four stated objectives:

- To make Taoist Tai Chi internal arts of health available to all.
- To promote the health-improving qualities of Taoist Tai Chi internal arts.
- To promote cultural exchange (specifically: ...to make the richness of Chinese culture more accessible...).
- To help others.

== History ==
The Taoist Tai Chi Society was founded by Moy Lin-shin. He arrived in Toronto, Ontario, Canada in 1970 and started teaching tai chi and related internal arts.

The primary style Moy taught was a tai chi form. He also taught a Liuhebafa form. Moy modified the orthodox Yang-style tai chi form that he knew, in order to maximize the health benefits from the form. Over the years, Moy trained many of his students to become instructors/teachers of this art of health.

On a 42-hectare rural property near Orangeville, Ontario, the society has built its residential Health Recovery Centre and Quiet Cultivation Centre, where members from around the world can gather and train together. The Quiet Cultivation Centre includes a large temple of Chinese-inspired design dedicated to Confucian, Buddhist and Taoist teachings, which was opened on 2007-09-08 with the participation of some 2,500 members. The construction was funded entirely by donations.

== Instruction ==
Classes are taught by volunteer instructors accredited by the Society. In order to become a volunteer instructor one has to express the desire to do so, and be able to show the elements of the form to new students.

A teacher of Taoist Tai Chi is encouraged to live by what Moy called "Eight Heavenly Virtues":

- Filial piety
- Sibling Harmony
- Dedication
- Trustworthiness
- Propriety
- Sacrifice
- Honor
- Sense of Shame

These principles are rooted in traditional Chinese Confucian ethics. Much of the corporate model is likewise reflected in Confucianism. The society also draws influences from the Buddhist philosophy of non-attachment generally, but compassion specifically as part of the aims and objectives of the society.

Moy's stated goal for Taoist Tai Chi was to help people regain their health and to provide a method for cultivation of the whole body and mind. Moy encouraged his students to engage with both traditional Eastern perspectives on health and energetic development (for example the three Taoist treasures of jing, chi and shen) as well as modern Western medical perspectives.

As a Taoist meditative practice of 'dual cultivation of mind and body', Moy also considered that Taoist Tai Chi arts of health would lead practitioners towards "taming the heart" i.e. developing an attitude of calm and compassion when dealing with stress and the activities of daily life. In the Taoist tradition such a training path is referred to as “cultivating both inner nature and life" (xing ming shuang xiu). A healthy body is considered to be one where the internal organs are interacting in a balanced and harmonious manner. Negative emotions, cravings and selfish desires can disturb this harmony.

== Celebration ==
Taoist Tai Chi Awareness Days have been proclaimed by municipal governments across Canada since the 1980s to acknowledge that "the slow and graceful movements of Tai Chi relax and strengthen the body and mind, help to relieve stress, develop flexibility and coordination which is particularly beneficial to seniors and others in combating a variety of health conditions and disabilities". These proclaimed days also serve to acknowledge that "members of the Taoist Tai Chi Society contribute many hours of service to our community, conducting fund-raising campaigns and events that have benefited many charitable organizations and other worthy causes,"

== Corporate information ==
In order to coordinate the initiatives that Moy Lin-shin undertook, together with the increasing number of people that he trained over time, and their activities, a formal organization was necessary. In the early seventies the organization was called the Toronto Tai Chi Association. In 1982 it was renamed and incorporated as the Taoist Tai Chi Society of Canada. After expansion into the United States, and later into Europe, New Zealand and Australia the International Taoist Tai Chi Society was formally incorporated in 1995.

Member associations are incorporated as non-profit organizations in their own countries and many are also registered as charitable organizations. For example, the Taoist Tai Chi Society of Canada is registered as a charitable organization in Canada. and the Taoist Tai Chi Society of the USA is a 501(c)(3) non-profit, charitable organization in the United States.

Since the death of Moy Lin-shin in 1998 the Taoist Tai Chi Society of Canada and the Fung Loy Kok Institute of Taoism (道教蓬萊閣 or Fung Loy Pavilion Taoism) continue to operate as separate charitable organizations within Canada, under the umbrella of the International Taoist Tai Chi Society. As of 2012 the corporate structure has changed with the Fung Loy Kok Institute of Taoism as the central organisation internationally. The international centre at Orangeville is also the property of the Fung Loy Kok Institute of Taoism (道教蓬萊閣) and Taoist Tai Chi and other practices as demonstrated by Moy Lin-Shin come under the Fung Loy Kok umbrella.

Fung Loy Kok Taoist Tai Chi (蓬萊閣道家太極拳) is becoming more frequently used as a term within the society to familiarise members with the merger.

== See also ==
- Moy Lin-shin
- Taoist Tai Chi
- Yuen Yuen Institute
