= Zhang Changxin =

Chinese martial artist

張長信 Zhang Changxin
- Born: unknown Shanghai, China
- Died: 1990
- Style: Neijia - Internal Martial Arts; Xingyiquan; Yiquan; Liuhebafa
- Teachers: Ma Yuetong - Xingyi; Wang Xiangzhai - Yiquan; Wu Yihui - Liuhebafa

Zhang Changxin (simplified Chinese: 张长信; traditional Chinese: 張長信; pinyin: Zhāng Chángxìn; Cantonese: Jeung Cheung-seun) was a champion boxer in Shanghai. Beginning his martial arts life with the study of Xingyiquan, he later went to Yiquan, and finally settled with Liuhebafa. Though he chose such a path, in the end it was still Xingyiquan that he remained recognized for, not Yiquan nor Liuhebafa.

== Biography ==
Originally, Zhang studied Xingyi and Bagua under Ma Yue Tong, and in 1928 he became a student of Wang Xiang Zhai, the founder of Yi Chuan. The same year he met Liuhebafa master Wu Yi Hui for the first time at a competition in Hangzhou. Later when Zhang was excelling with his Yi Chuan training, Wang sent him to Wu for deeper study in Liuhebafa. Zhang continued Yi Chuan but also took up the Liuhebafa tradition studying diligently and learning the art quite deeply. Zhang Changxin's Liuhebafa was different from what Wu had taught him though. Though he taught the Liuhebafa form "zhu ji chuan" it was highly modified, and using the power Xingyi and Bagua at its core. His version had less stepping and lower-body focus than the original, using Yi Chuan's relaxed stepping as opposed to Liuhebafa's structured transitioning stances, and himself labeled it the "active step version 活歩式" accordingly. Zhang wrote an in-depth book on Liuhebafa that was published in 1990, the same year he died.

Zhang was also recognized for being one of the 4 Diamond Warriors. This was a group of the 4 top fighters of Wang Xiang Zhai in Yi Chuan. These 4 were later instructed to learn Liuhebafa under Wu Yi Hui, the personal friend of Wang. They were: Han Xingqiao, Zhang Changxin, Zhao Daoxin, and Gao Zhen Dong 高振東.

== See also ==
- Wang Xiangzhai
- Yi Chuan
- Wu Yihui
- Liuhebafa
