= Jiang Rongqiao =

Jiang Rongqiao 姜容樵
- Born: 1891; Hebei, China
- Died: 1974 (aged 82–83)
- Style: Cheng Style Baguazhang, Xingyiquan, Chen-style tai chi, Liuhebafa, Other minor Neijia styles
- Teacher: Zhang Zhaodong
- Rank: Founder of Jiang Style Baguazhang

Other information
- Notable students: Sha Guozhen, Zou Shuxian, Ji Yuansong, Yang Bangtai

Jiang Rongqiao (Chinese: 姜容樵; pinyin: Jiāng Róngqiáo; Wade–Giles: Chiang Jung Ch’iao; 1891-1974) was a famous martial artist from Hebei, China. His specialized focus on the internal arts led him to develop his own system of Bagua which became recognized and known as Jiang Style Baguazhang.

== Biography ==
In 1926, Jiang Rongqiao began teaching kung fu in Nanjing. Jiang was instrumental in developing sets that combined Bagua, Xingyi, and tai chi. This includes a tai chi set known as "Taiji Zhang Quan" (or tai chi palm and fist), which is based on sequences from Jiang's Bagua and Xingyi, as well as the Old Chen-style tai chi. Some students of Jiang point to these combined forms as a legacy of his teacher, Zhang Zhaodong. The practice of internal style Chinese martial arts (Baguazhang, Xingyiquan and Taijiquan and a variety of minor styles) has been called Neijia kung fu. Because Jiang taught Baguazhang along with Xingyiquan (and taught Taiji Zhang Quan as an advanced form), it is difficult to categorize the practice he taught as anything other than Neijia kung fu.

Jiang had an accident and went blind. Jiang's adopted daughter, Zou Shuxian, taught classes and helped produce his most famous book, Bagua Palms Practice Method. This was the first Baguazhang book published in China after the 1949 revolution. This book greatly enhanced Jiang's reputation as one of the most famous Chinese internal-style martial artists of his generation. Jiang Rongqiao died at the age of 84. Several of his closest students were: Sha Guozhen, Zou Shuxian, Ji Yuansong, and Yang Bangtai.

== Jiang Rongqiao's Books ==
Jiang Rongqiao authored a number of books (Joseph Crandall has translated many of these books into English):

Xingyi Muquan (Xingyi Mother Fists);

Baguazhang Lianxifa (Bagua Palms Practice Method);

Xingyi Zasichui and Bashiquan;

Xingyi Lianhuanquan;

Bagua Mysterious Spear;

Qingping Sword;

Tiger Tail Whip.

== See also ==
- Jiang Style Baguazhang
- Baguazhang
