= Wu Chengzhen =

- 吳誠真
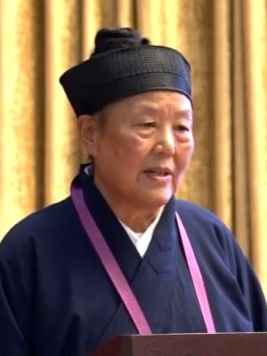
- Wu in 2023
- Born: Wu Yuanzhen; January 14, 1957 (age 69); Xinzhou District, Wuhan, Hubei, China
- Occupation: Taoist abbess
- Years active: 1984–present
- Known for: First principal female abbess in Taoist history

Wu Chengzhen (Chinese: 吳誠真; born 14 January 1957) is the first woman to become a Fangzhang (principal abbess) in the history of Taoism, which occurred in 2009.

== Early life ==
Wu Yuanzhen (Chinese: 吳元真) was born on 14 January 1957, in Xinzhou District, Wuhan, Hubei province, China as the youngest daughter of a family of six brothers and sisters. As a child, Wu read books belonging to her relatives about Buddhism, Christianity and Taoism. Before the Cultural Revolution, she was able to finish high school and began working as an accountant, but no options for formal higher education were open to her. Wu began self-study, reading texts on philosophy, theology and enlightenment and at the age of 23 she followed an older sister's lead, making a commitment to Taoism, and changed her name to Wu Chengzhen.

== Career ==
=== Early career ===
Wu began work as a cook and gardener at the Changchun Taoist Temple of Wuhan. She studied with Xie Zhongxin, the 22nd fangzhang of Baiyun Temple in Beijing and after four years, in March 1984 she became a monk. The Changchun Temple, built during the Yuan dynasty, is one of the most important in China. In 1995, Wu was appointed the temple's zhuchi (lower-ranking abbess), and was selected as vice president of the Taoist Association of Wuhan. One of her main duties is fundraising. Taoist clergy depend on public donations for their public works projects. Wu reportedly has around 10,000 followers who annually donate at least 2 million yuan (US$292,920), used to care for the poor and children who have dropped out of school, widows, as well as for construction projects for bridges, roads, schools, and disaster relief.

=== Later career ===
In 2001, Wu completed a master's degree in philosophy at Huazhong University of Science and Technology She became president of both the Hubei province and Wuhan Taoist Associations in 2007. In 2009, Wu began studying for her doctorate degree at Renmin University of China with a thesis topic which evaluates the function of Taoism in creating a harmonious society. In 2009, she was unanimously elected by all of the leaders in all the Changchun Temple's departments to serve as their principal abbess. She became such on 15 November 2009. In 2014, Wu traveled to the United States and helped found the U.S. Taoist Association.
