= Research Association of Laozi Taoist Culture =

The Research Association of Laozi Taoist Culture or Chinese Research Association of Laozi Taoist Culture (RALTC or CRALTC) is an academic and religious organization founded in March 2008 in China whose aim is to promote higher education and research on Taoism in China and abroad.

The inauguration ceremony took place at the Great Hall of the People of Beijing with supervision of Ge Rongjin, a professor from Renmin University of China.
