= Wu Yihui =

Chinese martial artist (1887–1958)

Wu Yihui 吳翼翬
- Born: November 30, 1887; Tieling City, Liaoning, China
- Died: March 29, 1958 (aged 70); Shanghai, China
- Style: Neijia - Internal Martial Arts; Huayue Xiyi Men 華嶽希夷門 (Liuhebafa 六合八法拳)
- Teachers: Yan Guoxing; Chen Guangdi; Chen Helu

Wu Yihui 吳翼翬 (Cantonese Ng Yik-fai) (1887 – 1958) was a Chinese martial artist and scholar. He was the first person to open teachings and spread the art of Liuhebafa in public, and was a prominent fighter and instructor who influenced many of the masters of his generation.

== Biography ==
Wu Yihui was originally from Tieling in northeast China, but later lived in Beijing. He was from a scholarly and official family, and a man of good nature who had strong martial art talents. He was also well versed in calligraphy and painting, enjoying social life and travel.

Wu Yihui was born on November 30, 1887. In 1896, he began private studies in Henan's Kaifeng. In 1900, Wu Yihui began learning Liuhebafa. The following year, he entered school in Beijing to continue his studies. That year, he was formally apprenticed to Liuhebafa masters Yan Guoxing and Chen Guangdi. In 1903, he entered the Beiyang Military School to prepare the first phase. He graduated from Baoding Military Academy in 1907 and was dispatched to the Beiyang Army, where he was appointed to staff officer of the first division. In 1915, he worked in the division of inventory of government industry in Beijing. He became a director of administration and taught literature at a middle school in Kaifeng in 1921. He worked as a teacher and an officer at South Senior High School in Shanghai in 1928, and the following year he was appointed to the Shanghai Xuhui College teaching literature and martial arts.

In 1932, he became the martial arts instructor at the Shanghai Youth Association teaching Liuhebafa. In 1935, he attended the first martial arts examination. He was appointed to head of education of the Central Martial Arts Academy by General Zhang Zhijiang in 1936, and in the same year attended the second martial arts examination. The next year, when the Japanese war began, he moved with the Central Martial Arts Academy first to Vietnam's Burma, later settling in Yunnan's Kunming.

In 1944, he was appointed commissioner of the natural resources committee, as well as the chief of the factory's military security brigade. He taught Liuhebafa in Shanghai in 1945. In 1947, he was appointed head of the natural resources committee of the Tianjin Iron and Steel Factory, as well as the machine factory manager. He became an associate instructor at the National Martial Arts Instructor Training Institute in 1949. He also became the chairman of the martial arts assembly. In 1951, he taught Liuhebafa to the workers' union club of the Shanghai Electricity Company. In 1957, he was appointed by Mayor Chen Yi to the Shanghai Literature and History Institute as the first librarian.

Wu Yihui died on March 29, 1958, at his home in Shanghai.

- Note: As a Chinese custom, some add 3 years onto the age of the departed to show longevity. It is for this reason that some records incorrectly show that Wu died in 1961, even though his family confirmed that it was indeed 1958.

Wang Xiangzhai, the creator of Yiquan, made a public statement regarding Wu Yihui in 1928 saying, "I have traveled across the country in research, engaging over a thousand people in martial combat, there have been only 2.5 people I could not defeat, namely Hunan's Xie Tiefu, Fujian's Fang Yizhuang and Shanghai's Wu Yihui."

Wang Xiangzhai and Wu Yihui were known to be close friends. When Wu started teaching Liuhebafa Wang instructed 4 of his students to study under Wu. They were: Han Xingqiao, Zhang Changxin, Zhao Daoxin, and Gao Zhen Dong. These 4 students later became known as the "4 Diamond Warriors" of Yiquan.

== See also ==
- Chan Yik Yan
- Liuhebafa
- Wang Xiangzhai
