= Hong Kong Taoist Association The Yuen Yuen Institute No.2 Secondary School =

Hong Kong Taoist Association The Yuen Yuen Institute No.2 Secondary School Chinese: 香港道教聯合會圓玄學院第二中學

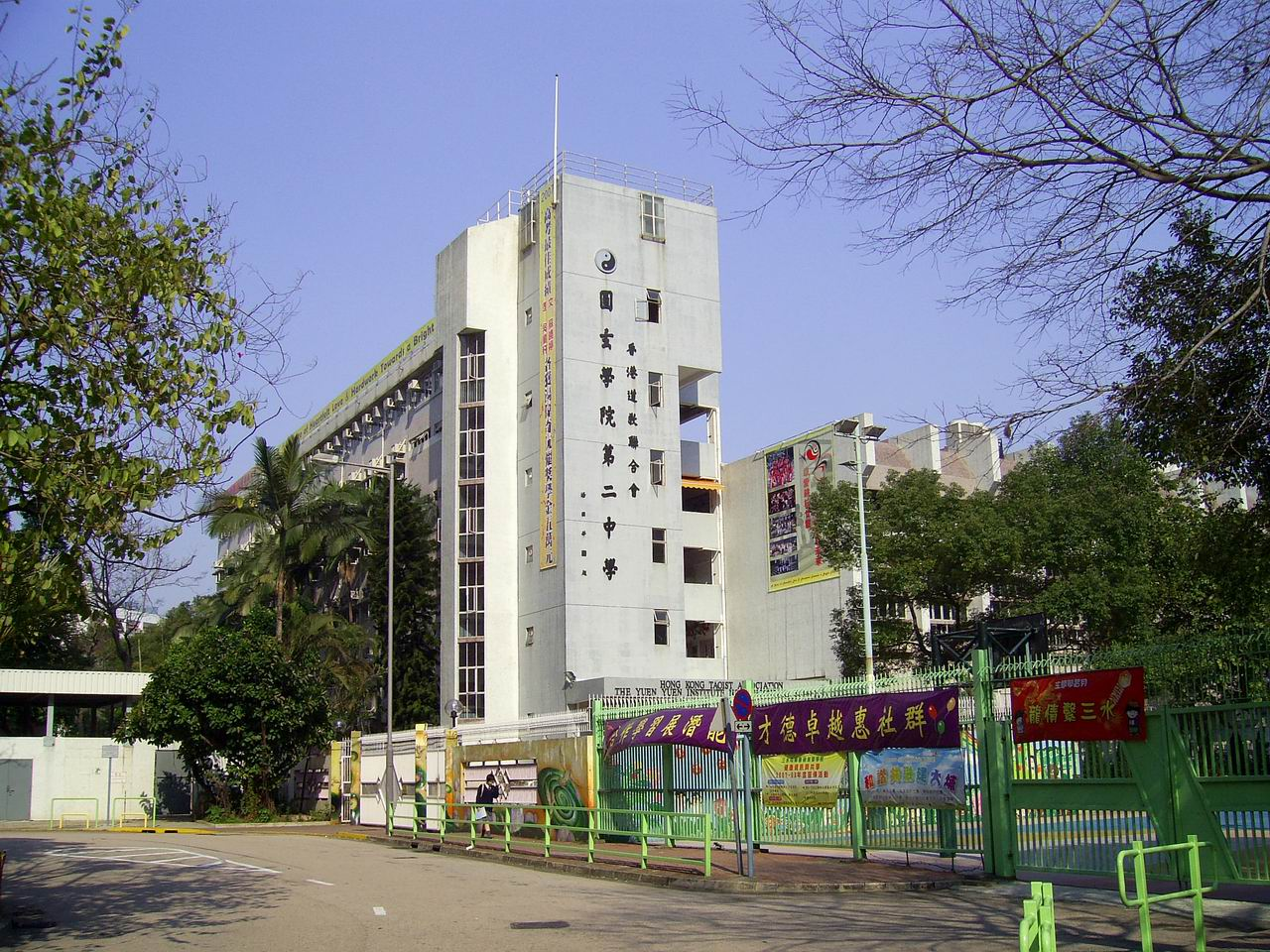
- Fu Shin Estate, Tai Po, New Territories; Hong Kong

Information
- Type: Aided Schools
- Established: 1988
- School district: Tai Po
- Principal: Mr. Weng Yonghan (1988-2004); Mr. Lam Kwong Fai (2005-2025)
- Affiliation: Taoism
- Founding body: Hong Kong Taoist Association
- Website: HKTA The Yuen Yuen Institute No.2 Secondary School

Hong Kong Taoist Association The Yuen Yuen Institute No.2 Secondary School (Chinese: 香港道教聯合會圓玄學院第二中學) was founded in 1988 as the 4th secondary school under the Hong Kong Taoist Association.

== Class Structures ==
=== Junior Form (F.1-F.3) ===
- 4 classes in each form.
- 2 classes will be taught in Chinese and English.
- 2 classes will be taught in Chinese.

Subjects Offered
Lessons of subject in each week	Form 1		Form 2			Form 3		
Lessons of subject in each week	1A, 1E	1B, 1C	2A	2E	2B, 2C	3A	3E	3B, 3C
Chinese Language	4	4	5	5	5	3.75	3.75	3.75
Chinese Literacy	-	-	-	-	-	0.5	0.5	0.5
Putonghua	1`	1`	1`	1`	1`	0.75`	0.75`	0.75`
English Language	6*	6*	6*	6*	6*	6*	6*	6*
English Drama	0	0.5*	-	-	-	-	-	-
Mathematics	4*	4	4*	4*	4	4*	4*	4
Science (Physics, Chemistry and Biology in form 3)	3*	3	3*	3*	3	3*	3*	3
LACS	1*	0	-	-	-	-	-	-
Chinese History	1	1	1	1	1	2	2	2
History	-	-	2	2*	2	1	1*	1
Geography	2	2	-	-	-	1	1*	1
Life and Society	1	1	1	1*	1	1	1*	1
Business & Accounting	-	-	-	-	-	1	1*	1
Design & Technology	0.5	0.5	0.5	0.5*	0.5	0.5	0.5*	0.5
Home Economics	0.5	1	0.5	0.5*	0.5	0.5	0.5*	0.5
Computer Literacy	1	1	1	1*	1	1	1*	1
Visual Arts	1	1	1	1*	1	1	1*	1
Music	1	1	1	1*	1	1	1*	1
Physical Education	2	2	2	2	2	1	1	1
Ethics & Religious Studies	1	1	1	1	1	1	1	1
Class period / Assembly	1	1	1	1	1	1	1	1

*：Teaching in English

`：Teaching in Putonghua

Others without markings：Teaching in Cantonese

=== Senior Secondary (F.4~6) ===
- 4 class in each form.
- In 2012, yy2 add Class S. Class S has 20 people. Without taking Electives X and Y, at the same time to take M2. Students that take Physics, Biology, ICT and Economics will be first got into Class S.
- In 2021, yy2 change Class E and S into Class C and D. Without taking Electives X and Y, Electives Z also can be chosen.

Form 4 (Estimated)

Subjects Offered
Others without markings：Teaching in Cantonese	Form 4		
Others without markings：Teaching in Cantonese	4A, 4B	4C	4D
Chinese Language	5	5	
English Language	6*	6*	
Mathematics	4	4*	
Civics Social	0	0	
Citizenship and Social Development	2	2	
Physical Education	2	2	
Ethics & Religious Studies	1	1	
Art Development	0	0	
Electives X	4	4	
Electives X	Visual Arts	Visual Arts	
Electives X	Chinese History	Chinese History	
Electives X	Tourism and Hospitality Studies	Tourism and Hospitality Studies	
Electives X	Physical Education (DSE)	Physical Education (DSE)	
Electives X	BAFS	BAFS	
Electives X	Biology	Biolory	
Electives X		Chemistry*	
Electives X		ICT*	
Electives Y	4	4	
Electives Y	Geography	Geography	
Electives Y	Chinese Literacy	Chinese Literacy	
Electives Y	History	History	
Electives Y	Economics	Economics	
Electives Y	ICT	ICT	
Electives Y	Chemistry	Chemistry	
Electives Y		Physics*	
Electives Y		BAFS*	
Electives Z	Z1~Z4 A lesson at every week		
Electives Z	Z1 Chinese Z2 Mathematics Z3 English* Z4 English*	Z1 English* Z1 English* Z2 Chinese Z2 Chinese Z3 Japanese Z3 M2* Z4 Japanese Z4 M2*	Z1 (Geography /Economics /Economics* /Biology /Biology*) Z2 (Geography /Economics /Economics* /Biology /Biology*) Z3 (Geography /Economics /Economics* /Biology /Biology*) Z4 (Geography /Economics /Economics* /Biology /Biology*)
Class period / Assembly	1	1	1

Form 5

Subjects Offered
Others without markings：Teaching in Cantonese	Form 5			
Others without markings：Teaching in Cantonese	5A, 5E	5B	5C	5D
Chinese Language	5		5	
English Language	6*		6*	
Mathematics	5		5*	
Civics Social	0		0	
Citizenship and Social Development	2		2	
Physical Education	1		1	
Ethics & Religious Studies	0		0	
Art Development	1		1	
Electives X	4		4	
Electives X	Visual Arts		Visual Arts	
Electives X	Chinese History		Chinese History	
Electives X	Tourism and Hospitality Studies		Tourism and Hospitality Studies	
Electives X	Physical Education (DSE)		Physical Education (DSE)	
Electives X	BAFS		BAFS	
Electives X	Biolory		Biolory	
Electives X			Chemistry*	
Electives X			ICT*	
Electives Y	4		4	
Electives Y	Geography		Geography	
Electives Y	Chinese Literacy		Chinese Literacy	
Electives Y	History		History	
Electives Y	Economics		Economics	
Electives Y	ICT		ICT	
Electives Y	Chemistry		Chemistry	
Electives Y			Physics*	
Electives Y			BAFS*	
Electives Z	Z1~Z4 A lesson at every week			
Electives Z	Z1 Chinese Z2 Chinese Z3 English* Z4 Mathematics	Z1 Chinese Z2 English* Z3 APL Z4 APL	Z1 English * Z1 English * Z2 Mathematics* Z2 Mathematics* Z3 Japanese Z3 M2* Z4 Japanese Z4 M2*	Z1 (Geography /Economics /Economics* /Biology /Biology*) Z2 (Geography /Economics /Economics* /Biology /Biology*) Z3 (Geography /Economics /Economics* /Biology /Biology*) Z4 (Geography /Economics /Economics* /Biology /Biology*)
Class period / Assembly	1	1	1	1

Form 6

Subjects Offered
Others without markings：Teaching in Cantonese	Form 6			
Others without markings：Teaching in Cantonese	6A	6B	6E	6S
Chinese Language	5		5	
English Language	6*		6*	
Mathematics	5		5*	
Liberal Social	4		4	
Citizenship and Social Development	0		0	
Physical Education	2		2	1
Ethics & Religious Studies	0		0	
Art Development	0		0	
M2	0		0	1
Electives X	4		4	
Electives X	Visual Arts		Visual Arts	
Electives X	Chinese History		Chinese History	
Electives X	Tourism and Hospitality Studies		Tourism and Hospitality Studies	
Electives X	Physical Education (DSE)		Physical Education (DSE)	
Electives X	BAFS		BAFS	
Electives X	Biolory		Biolory	
Electives X			Chemistry*	
Electives X			ICT*	
Electives Y	4		4	
Electives Y	Geography		Geography	
Electives Y	Chinese Literacy		Chinese Literacy	
Electives Y	History		History	
Electives Y	Economics		Economics	
Electives Y	ICT		ICT	
Electives Y	Chemistry		Chemistry	
Electives Y			Physics*	
Electives Y			BAFS*	
Electives Z	Z1~Z4 A lesson at every week			
Electives Z	Z1 Chinese Z2 Chinese Z3 English* Z4 Mathematics	Z1 APL Z2 APL Z3 Chinese Z4 English*	Z1 English * Z1 English * Z2 Mathematics* Z2 Mathematics* Z3 Japanese Z3 M2* Z4 Japanese Z4 M2*	Z1 (Geography /Economics /Economics* /Biology /Biology*) Z2 (Geography /Economics /Economics* /Biology /Biology*) Z3 (Geography /Economics /Economics* /Biology /Biology*) Z4 (Geography /Economics /Economics* /Biology /Biology*)
Class period / Assembly	1	1	1	1

*：Teaching in English

Others without markings：Teaching in Cantonese

- Main course: Chinese Language, English Language, Mathematics (Core, M2), Liberal Social.

(In 2021 the system was changed. M2 had been canceled changed, Liberal Social into Citizenship and Social Development)

- Required courses: Physical Education, Ethics & Religious Studies (Only in Form 4), Art Development (Only in Form 5).
- Elective Courses: Students can take one of Electives in X, Y, Z. (For detailed elective subject information, please refer to the table above.)

== Famous alumni ==
- Ms. Kwong Mei-fung, Mabel - former TVB News reporter
