= Five precepts (Taoism) =

Basic ethics code for lay practitioners

In Taoism, the five precepts (Chinese: 五戒; pinyin: Wǔ Jiè; Jyutping: Ng^{5} Gaai^{3}) constitute the basic code of ethics undertaken mainly by lay practitioners. For monks and nuns, there are more advanced and stricter precepts. The Five Precepts are nearly the same as the Five Precepts of Buddhism; however, there are minor differences to fit in with Chinese society.

Scholars have found that these precepts express Taoist concerns about the right to life regarding all living beings, ethics, animal welfare, human and animal relationships, and harmony with nature.

According to The Ultra Supreme Elder Lord's Scripture of Precepts (Orthodox Taoist Canon 0809), the five basic precepts are:

- The first precept: No Killing;
- The second precept: No Stealing;
- The third precept: No Sexual Misconduct;
- The fourth precept: No False Speech;
- The fifth precept: No Taking of Intoxicants.

Their definitions can be found in the scripture as follows:

The Elder Lord said: "The precept against killing is: All living beings, including all kinds of animals, and those as small as insects, worms, and so forth, are containers of the uncreated energy, thus one should not kill any of them."

The Elder Lord said: "The precept against stealing is: One should not take anything that he does not own and is not given to him, whether it belongs to someone or not."

The Elder Lord said: "The precept against sexual misconduct is: If a sexual conduct happens, but it is not between a man and a woman who are married to each other, it is a Sexual Misconduct. (Note: The term for married spouses (夫婦) usually means "husband and wife".) As for a monk or nun, he or she should never marry or have sex with anyone." (Note: This also outlines that sexual acts such as premarital sexual conduct, adultery, prostitution, using prostitutes, etc., are all sexual misconduct.) [Original commentary: Even if a man and a woman are married to each other, if they have sex too frequently, that is also considered Sexual Misconduct.]

The Elder Lord said: "The precept against false speech is: If one did not hear, see, or feel something, or if something is not realized by his Heart, but he tells it to others, this constitutes False Speech."

The Elder Lord said: "The precept against taking of intoxicants is: One should not take any alcoholic drinks, unless he has to take some to cure his illness."[Smoking, taking of drugs, and the likes, are also forbidden by this precept.]

The Elder Lord said: "These five precepts are the fundamentals for keeping one's body in purity, and are the roots of the upholding of the holy teachings. For those virtuous men and virtuous women who enjoy the virtuous teachings, if they can accept and keep these precepts, and never violate any of them till the end of their lifetimes, they are recognized as those with pure faith, they will gain the Way to Tao, will gain the holy principles, and will forever achieve Tao -- the Reality."

== See also ==
- Ten precepts (Taoism)
- Five precepts (Buddhism)
