= Ching Chung Koon =

Taoist temple and monastery in Hong Kong

- 青松觀
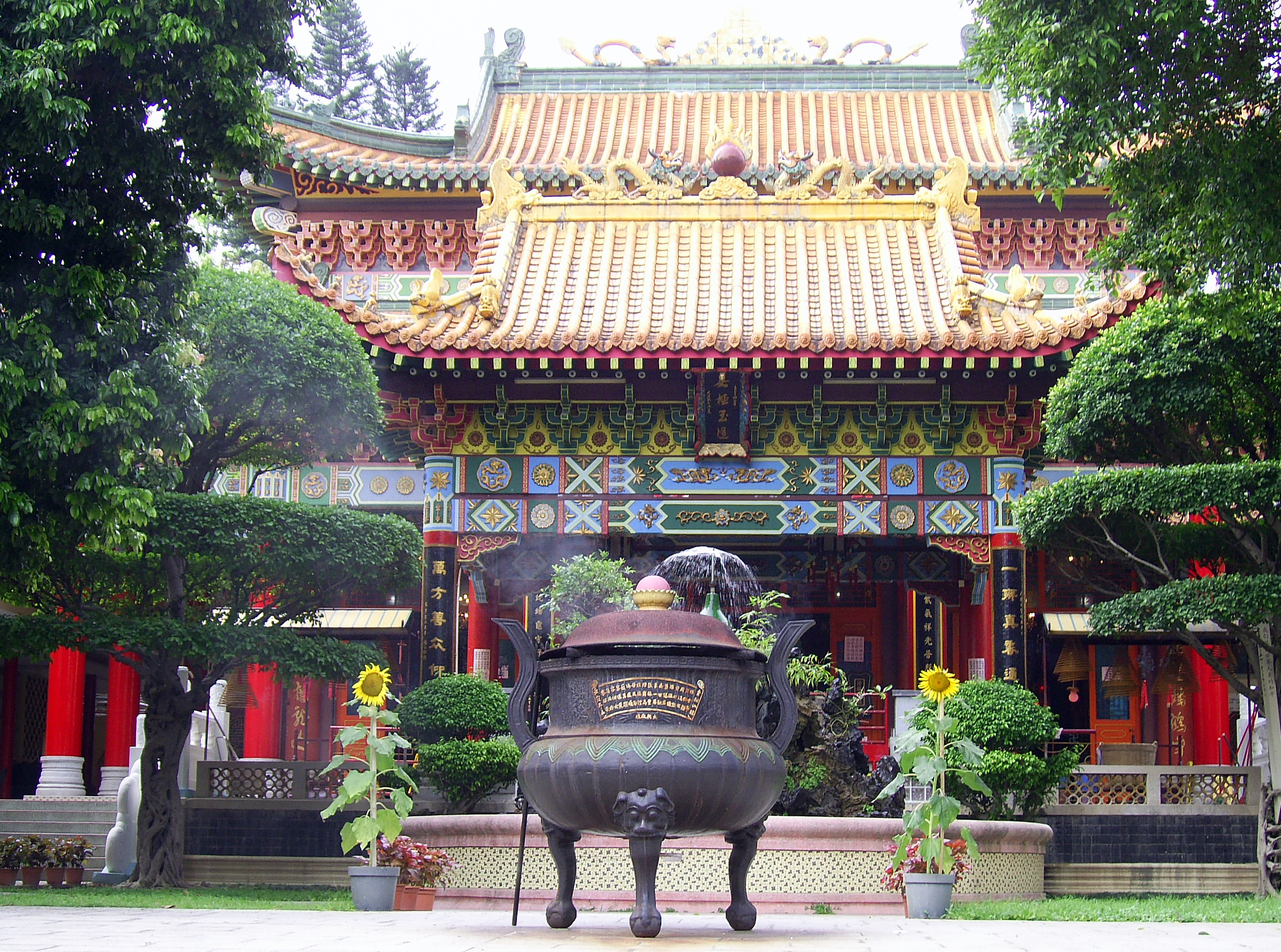
- Shun Yeung Din (純陽殿; 'Palace of Pure Yang') in Ching Chung Koon.

- Location in Hong Kong

Religion
- Affiliation: Taoism

Location
- Location: 8 Tsing Chung Path, Tuen Mun, New Territories
- Country: China
- Coordinates: 22.4062°N 113.9734°E

Architecture
- Completed: 1949; 77 years ago

Ching Chung Koon
- Traditional Chinese: 青松觀
- Literal meaning: Green Pine Temple
Transcriptions
Yue: Cantonese
- Yale Romanization: Chēng chùhng gūn
- Jyutping: Ceng1 cung4 gun1

Ching Chung Koon is a Taoist Temple and active Taoist organisation located in Tuen Mun, Hong Kong.

== History ==
Ching Chung Koon is a Taoist temple first established in Kowloon during 1950. A permanent temple was eventually built in Tuen Mun during 1960 and a branch temple at Kowloon was established in 1974.

== Features ==
This peaceful temple also contains many treasures, such as lanterns from Beijing's Imperial Palace. The temple is divided into several houses where many dead peoples' bone ashes are permanently stored in special apartments with their picture, name, date of birth, date of death and place of origin. During the Ching Ming and Chung Yeung Festivals, many people come here to remember their relatives or friends who have died.

Besides the temple, there are also Chinese-style gardens, a small man-made "hill" and fishponds. Ching Chung Koon also features bonsai exhibitions which are held periodically.

== Welfare services and education ==
The temple had been offering free TCM medical services since it was first established in the 1950s. The first western medical clinic in Ching Chung Koon was established in 1975 offers economical medical services to nearby residents, the second clinic was set up in 1977. Two TCM based free clinics were established in 2003 and 2005.

Since the 1980s, the temple had established and managed two secondary schools (Hong Kong Taoist Association Ching Chung Secondary School and Ching Chung Hau Po Woon Secondary School), three primary schools (Taoist Ching Chung Primary School, Taoist Ching Chung Primary School (Wu King Estate) and Ching Chung Hau Po Woon Primary School) and two kindergartens (Ching Chung Wu King Kindergarten and Ching Chung Hing Tung Kindergarten) in Hong Kong. The temple has also established the "Hong Kong Taoist College" in 1991 to promote Taoist education, printing Taoist publications and organising global Taoist conferences.

The temple had also set up an old folk home in 1960, an elderly care home in 1986 and a neighbourhood elderly centre in 1997.

== Oversea branch temples ==
In November 1981, Ching Chung Koon set up their first oversea branch temple in San Francisco, United States. At present, Ching Chung Koon has established several oversea branch temples which are mainly located in the United States, Canada and Australia.
