= Chan Yik Yan =

陳亦人 Chen Yi Ren
- Chen Yi Ren / Chan Yik Yan
- Born: 1909; Guangdong, China
- Died: 1982 (aged 72–73); Hong Kong
- Style: Neijia - Internal Martial Arts; Hua Yue Xi Yi Men 華嶽希夷門 (Liuhebafa Chuan 六合八法拳)

Chan Yik Yan (Chinese: 陳亦人, Chen Yi Ren; 1909–1982) was a martial artist.
