= Chen Tuan =

Chinese Taoist sage

- Family name: Chén (陳); Given name: Tuán (摶); Courtesy name: Túnán (圖南)
- Chen Xiyi Asleep by Hasegawa Tōhaku, Ishikawa Nanao Art Museum
- Born: Luyi County, Henan
- Died: August 25, 989
- Other names: Chén Xīyí (陳希夷); Fúyáozǐ (扶搖子)
- Occupation: Taoist

Chen Tuan
- Traditional Chinese: 陳摶
- Simplified Chinese: 陈抟
Transcriptions
Standard Mandarin
- Hanyu Pinyin: Chén Tuán
- Wade–Giles: Ch'ên^{2} T'uan^{2}
Yue: Cantonese
- Yale Romanization: Chan^{4} Tyun^{4}
- Jyutping: Can^{4} Tyun^{4}

Chen Tuan Chinese: 陳摶 (died August 25, 989) was a Chinese Taoist credited with creation of the kung fu system Liuhebafa ("Six Harmonies and Eight Methods"). Along with this internal art, he is also said to be associated with a method of qi (energy) cultivation known today as Taiji ruler and a 24-season Daoyin method (ershisi shi daoyin fa) using seated and standing exercises designed to prevent diseases that occur during seasonal changes throughout the year.

== Name and titles ==
The character "Tuan" (摶) is sometimes confused with the very similar-looking character "Bo" (搏), thus the name is sometimes incorrectly romanized as Chen Bo or Chen Po. In Chinese, he is often respectfully referred to as "Aged Ancestor Chen Tuan" (陳摶老祖 Chén Tuán Lǎozǔ) and "Ancestral Teacher Xiyi" (希夷祖師 Xīyí Zǔshī).

Chen Tuan, styled Tunan, titled himself Fuyao Zi (one soaring upward in the high sky, from Nan Hua Jing written by Zhuangzi).

Known as the "Sleeping Immortal", he is credited with using and creating sleeping qigong methods of internal alchemical cultivation.

== Biography and legends ==
Little is certain about his life, including when and where he was born. He was born around the end of the Five Dynasties and Ten Kingdoms period (907 AD – 960 AD) and the start of the Song dynasty (960 AD – 1279 AD), possibly in what is now Luyi in Henan province. By another account, he was born in Zhenyuan of Haozhou (today's Anhui province).

Chen is said to have been astonishingly intelligent and erudite in his childhood.

According to certain Taoist schools who claim him as a founder, he lived two decades of a secluded life in the Nine Room Cave on Mount Wudang, though traveled frequently. In the first year of the Xiande period of the Later Zhou dynasty (954), he is known to have been living on the Mount Hua, one of the five sacred mountains of China.

The story goes that Chen Tuan had planned a career at the imperial court but flunked the state examination and became a hermit sage instead. Thus, as a student he was conversant with the Confucian classics, history, and the theories of various schools of thought. Among the classics, he was particularly fond of the Yi jing (Book of Changes), which he was unable to put down. Apart from the classics, he was said to be conversant with medical principles, astronomy and geography, and famous for his poems as well.

Chen Tuan had a good command of primordial Yi learning, taught the River Chart and Luo River Book as well as the Infinite and Taiji Charts. As an important teacher of Taoist doctrines who pioneered the Confucian school of idealist philosophy of the Song and Ming dynasties, he had a profound influence upon later generations.

Having rejected the emperor's orders and edicts, he was still conferred the title of "Master Xi Yi" (Master of the Inaudible and Invisible) by the emperor Taizong of the Song dynasty. During the first year of Duangong period (988), Chen appointed his disciples to cut a stone chamber in the Zhao Chao Valley (later renamed Xi Yi Valley); then Chen Tuan presented a report to the imperial court in which he wrote the following note: "I will die soon. I am about to leave, nowadays I'm transformed in the Zhang Chao Valley at the foot of Lotus Peak on the 22nd day of the tenth month of the lunar calendar." By the time he died when he cupped his cheek in his hand his facial features remained unchanged.

Many tales of Chen Tuan have been circulated around and it is said that "He wanders around and shows no concern for worldly benefits." However, despite many mystical and mysterious stories, Chen was known to care about and was compassionate to ordinary people. For this he is deeply respected by the common folk. This Taoist sage was considered the embodiment of the Supreme Lord Lao and received the nickname of "Aged Ancestor," a symbol of Taoism in Mount Hua. Chen Tuan is depicted in the Wu Shuang Pu (無雙譜, Table of Peerless Heroes) by Jin Guliang.

Chen Tuan is traditionally associated with Daoist practices of sleep cultivation (Shui Gong, 睡功), emphasizing the refinement of spirit through rest and deep stillness. These methods influenced later Daoist approaches to meditation, inner alchemy, and longevity practices.

== Later historical references ==
According to the "semi-historical" biography of General Yue Fei, it was the immortal Chen Tuan who, disguised as a wandering Taoist, warned the Yue family of the imminent Yellow River flood.

== Sources ==
- General Yue Fei ISBN 962-04-1279-6
- Filbert, Vitaly. (2025). The Art of Sleeping (translations and commentary of classical texts by Chen Tuan, Zhang Sanfeng, Lü Dongbin, Wang Daoyuan, and other Daoist masters on the Art of Sleeping)

== See also ==
- Chan Yik Yan
- Wu Yi Hui
