= Yuen Yuen Institute =

Taoist temple in Hong Kong

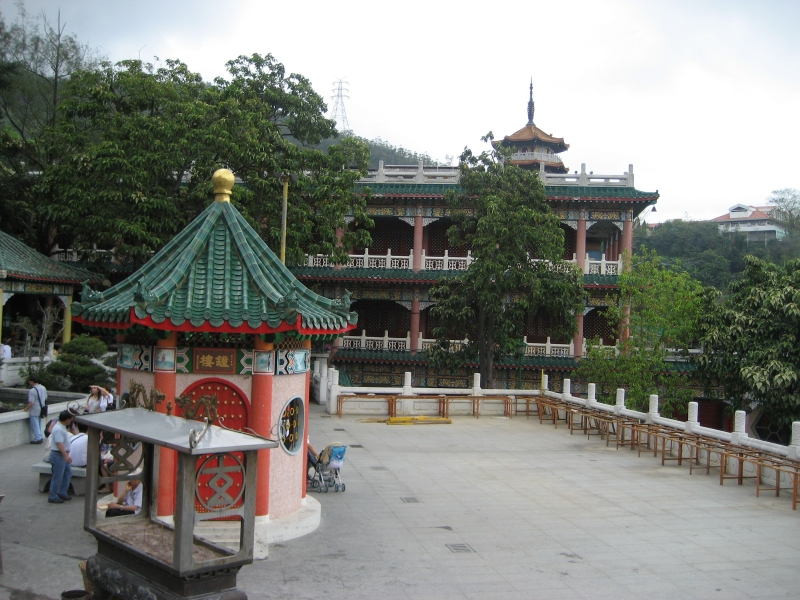
- View of the Yuen Yuen Institute

- Location in Hong Kong

Religion
- Affiliation: Taoism

Location
- Country: Hong Kong
- Coordinates: 22°23′0″N 114°7′22″E

The Yuen Yuen Institute (Chinese: 圓玄學院; Jyutping: jyun4 jyun4 hok6 jyun2) is a Taoist temple in Lo Wai, Tsuen Wan District, Hong Kong.

== Location ==
The Institute is located on hectares of land around Sam Dip Tam (三疊潭), Tsuen Wan District in the New Territories. The area is interspersed with temples, pavilions, and monasteries.

== History ==
The Yuen Yuen Institute was established in Hong Kong in 1950 by monks from Sanyuan Gong (Three Originals Palace) in Guangzhou, which in turn traces its lineage to the Longmen (Dragon Gate) Lineage of Quanzhen (Complete Perfection) Taoism.

The Yuen Yuen Institute is the only temple in Hong Kong dedicated to all three major Chinese religions: Taoism, Buddhism and Confucianism. The first three Chinese characters of the Institute's name denote the essence of Buddhism, Taoism and Confucianism respectively, so as to advocate the integration and realization of the three religions' teachings.

The main building at the Institute is a replica of the Temple of Heaven (Tian Tan) in Beijing. In 1968, Moy Lin-shin co-founded (together with Taoist Masters Mui Ming-to and Mrs Tang Yuen Mei) the temple for the Fung Loy Kok Institute of Taoism on the grounds of the Yuen Yuen Institute.

== Purpose ==
The Institute's purpose is:

- to spread the principles of the three religions, Taoism, Buddhism and Confucianism;
- to uphold the eight virtues (i.e. filial piety, respect, loyalty, fidelity, propriety, justice, honesty and honour);
- to promote social welfare.

== Activities ==
- During the annual Lantern Festival, donations are exchanged for lanterns in the belief that these will bring fortune and health. The proceeds go to maintaining the Old Age Home and the hospitals and schools run by the Yuen Yuen Institute.
- An annual Bonsai and Stone Appreciation Show.
- A restaurant is maintained at the Institute that offers vegetarian food.
- Celebration of Chinese New Year or Ghost Month (the 7th month of the lunar calendar).
