= Wang Liping (Taoist) =

Chinese Taoist

Wang Liping (Chinese: 王力平), Daoist name Wang Yongsheng (王永生) and Dharma name Linglingzi (灵灵子). He was born on June 6, 1949, on the foot of Changbai Mountain in Fushun, Liaoning, China.

== Introduction ==
Wang Liping was taught and trained by three Daoist hermits—Zhang Hedao (Wu-Ji Daoist) who was the 16th generation transmitter, as well as Wang Jiaoming and Jia Jiaoyi, who are both 17th generation Dragon Gate Daoists of the Quanzhen School. Wang Liping currently lives in Mainland China.

Wang Liping has been called a modern Taoist wizard in the book Opening the Dragon Gate: The Making of a Modern Taoist Wizard by Chen Kaiguo and Zheng Shunchao.

Wang explained traditional Daoist training techniques to modern people by using contemporary languages. Master Wang publicly teaches people parts of Ling Bao Bi Fa, which is a book about internal alchemy arts written by Zhongli Quan in the Han Dynasty. The art of Master Wang's teaching was known as "Internal alchemy of Ling Bao Intelligence Enlightenment". The authors of "Xing-Da-Dao (Entering Dragongate)" claim that their work captures Mr. Wang Liping's public teaching during his early years.

== Media reports ==
- Former CCP General Secretary Jiang Zemin had recommended Wang Liping to treat the former Russian president Boris Yeltsin
- Internal alchemy at Lou Guan Temple in 1998. [6]
- Internal alchemy at Yu Chan Temple in 2007. [7]
- Europeans were trained by Wang for Internal alchemy practicing based on <the Secret of the Golden Flower > in 2007, the report was published in 《contemporary Academic Research 》 [8].
- Internal alchemy seminar at Jinhua Immortal Huang birth Palace of Zhejiang province in 2008 [9].
- In 2009, Master Wang Liping was invited to have public teaching in the 1st Taoism Health and Culture Summer Camp at Jinhua city of Zhejiang province [10].
- From 2008 to 2011, Wang was invited to a seminar in Russia.
- In 2009, Master Wang Liping taught a study group of eleven students from the San Francisco Bay Area, New York, Switzerland and Israel, and went to a hot spring holiday resort place near Dalian city of China.(http://www.laoziacademy.us/2009_anbo.htm)[11].
- In April 2011, Master Wang Liping taught a study group of 14 foreign students from Northern America, Southern America, Europe, Africa, South Asia, etc. in China.(http://laoziacademy.us/2011_april.html)[12].
