= Hong Kong Taoist Association =

Hong Kong Taoist Association (Chinese: 香港道教聯合會) is a Taoist organisation in Hong Kong. It promotes Taoism in Hong Kong and provides a series of charity services in Hong Kong, including education, medical, child care, youth activities, elderly care.

The Hong Kong Taoist Association was formed in 1957, registered as a legal association in 1961, and re-registered as a limited company in 1967. It covers more than 100 Taoist temples. Originally headquartered on Tai Nan Street, a new site was chosen in 2003 on Castle Peak Road where the association has offices and conference halls.

Its activities include preaching, holding Taoist lectures and philosophy classes, Wudang health exercises, Daoyue training classes and Neidan Qigong among others.

The association has 5 middle schools, 5 primary schools, and 6 kindergartens. The association has made efforts to support the construction of schools in the mainland.

Since 2013, the second Sunday in March every year has been designated as "Taoist Day". The establishment of "Hong Kong Taoist Day" is a milestone for the association to promote Taoism and teach and public welfare.

The association is among the six religious bodies of Hong Kong designated to represent the Religious Subsector in the Election Committee.

== See also ==
- Taoism in Hong Kong
- Hong Kong Taoist Association Tang Hin Memorial Secondary School
- Hong Kong Taoist Association The Yuen Yuen Institute No.2 Secondary School
