= Hong Kong Taoist Association Tang Hin Memorial Secondary School =

Coordinates: 22.4994°N 114.129°E

- 香港道教聯合會鄧顯紀念中學
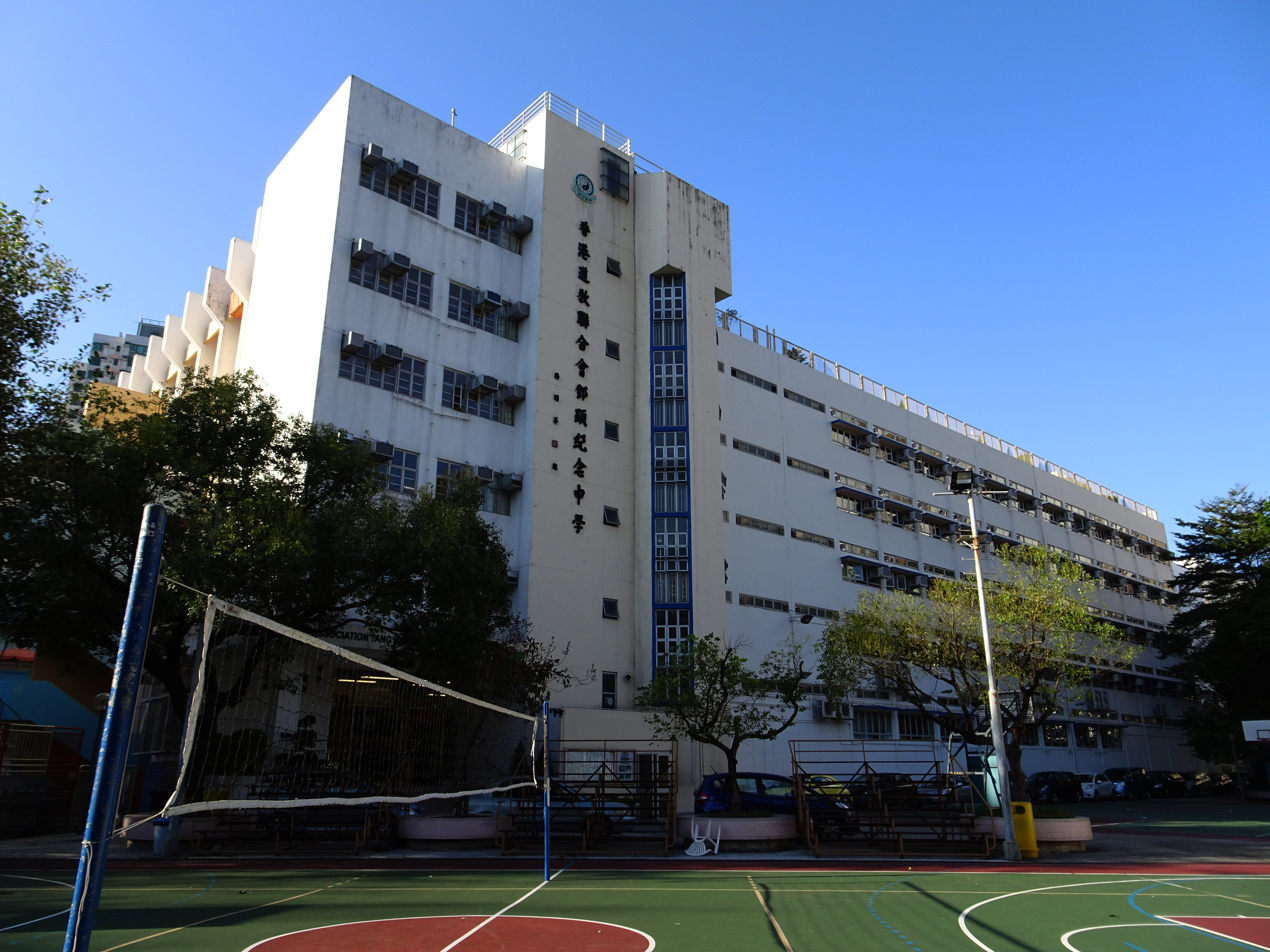
- School view
- Choi Yuen Estate, Sheung Shui, New Territories, Hong Kong.

Information
- Type: Subsidised school
- Motto: "Grasp Principles, Cultivate Virtues" (明道立德)
- Religious affiliation: Taoism
- Established: 1982; 44 years ago
- Oversight: Hong Kong Taoist Association
- Enrolment: 894
- Language: English
- Website: https://www.tanghin.edu.hk

Hong Kong Taoist Association Tang Hin Memorial Secondary School (Chinese: 香港道教聯合會鄧顯紀念中學, abbreviated as THMSS) is a secondary school located in Choi Yuen Estate, Sheung Shui, Hong Kong. It is one of the most famous schools in Hong Kong and it is a band 1 school. It has a good academic result in the DSE exam. The main medium of instruction is English.

The school motto is "Grasp Principles, Cultivate Virtues" (明道立德).

== History ==
The school was established in 1982. It is the second school owned by Hong Kong Taoist Association and it is the first secondary school of the association. At the time it was established, it was a band 5 secondary school with a modest reputation. But after the hard work of previous students, the school progressively made great improvements in examinations and it changed to a band 2 school later in 1997. After that, it has transformed into a band 1 school in 2003. Since then, the school has attained good exam results every year and has been one of the top schools in Hong Kong. Also, it is recognized as the best school in New Territories. In 2007 and 2008, 4 students got 10A in the Public Examination (HKCE)(HKAL). In 2015, 1 student got 5** in 9 subjects in the Public Examination (HKDSE). In 2025, 1 student got 5** results in 8 subjects in the Public Examination (HKDSE).

== Subjects ==
- Chinese
- English
- Mathematics
- Life & Society
- Citizenship and Social Development
- Liberal Studies
- Integrated Science
- Physics
- Chemistry
- Biology
- Computer Literacy
- Information & Communication Technology (Web Elective & Programming Elective)
- Economics
- Chinese Literature
- Chinese History
- History
- Geography
- BAFS (Business, Accounting and Financial Studies)
- Life Education
- Putonghua
- Visual Arts
- Music
- Physical Education

== Principal ==
- Mr. Poon Huen Wai (From 1982 to 2007)
- Mr. Lau Chi Yuen (From 2007 to 2020)
- Mr. Wong Shun Tak (From 2020 until now)

== Transport ==
The school is located next to Sheung Shui station, near Choi Yuen bus terminus.

== See also ==
- Taoism
- Tao Te Ching
- Hong Kong Taoist Association
