= Ten precepts (Taoism) =

Code of conduct in Taoism

The Ten Precepts of Taoism were outlined in a short text that appears in Dunhuang manuscripts (DH31, 32), the Scripture of the Ten Precepts (Shíjiè jīng 十戒經). The precepts are the classical rules of medieval Taoism as applied to practitioners attaining the rank of Disciple of Pure Faith (qīngxīn dìzǐ 清心弟子). They first appeared in the Scripture on Setting the Will on Wisdom (Zhìhuì dìngxīn jīng 智慧定心經) (DZ325).

There is one rule that is divided into Ten Precepts. That rule is the Tao (or Dao).

== The Precepts of Taoism ==
1. Do not kill but always be mindful of the host of living beings.
2. Do not be lascivious or think depraved thoughts.
3. Do not steal or receive unrighteous wealth.
4. Do not cheat or misrepresent good and evil.
5. Do not get intoxicated but always think of pure conduct.
6. I will maintain harmony with my ancestors and family and never disregard my kin.
7. When I see someone do a good deed, I will support him with joy and delight.
8. When I see someone unfortunate, I will support him with dignity to recover good fortune.
9. When someone comes to do me harm, I will not harbor thoughts of revenge.
10. As long as all beings have not attained the Dao, I will not expect to do so myself.

== See also ==
- The Taoist Five Precepts
- The Buddhist Five Precepts
- The Buddhist Eight Precepts
