= Liuhebafa =

Chinese martial art

Liuhebafa quan
- Chen Tuan, the Taoist sage credited with inventing liuhebafa quan
- Also known as: Shuiquan, xinyi liuhebafa
- Focus: Hitting, weapons training, qigong
- Country of origin: China
- Creator: Chen Tuan
- Parenthood: Wudang Quan

Liuhebafa Quan (Chinese: 六合八法拳; pinyin: liùhébāfǎ quán; lit. 'Six-Harmonies Eight-Methods Boxing') is a Neijia (internal) Chinese martial art.

== History ==
The Song dynasty Taoist sage Chen Tuan is often credited with its origin and development. He was associated with the Taoist Monastery on Mount Hua in Shaanxi Province.

It is said he had learned the art from three teachers: Yan Guoxing, Chen Guangdi (who learned the art from a monk, Da Yuan and a Taoist, Li Chan), and Chen Helu.

== See also ==
- Wu Yihui
- Chan Yik Yan
- Zhang Changxin
