= Danjiangkou =

Danjiangkou 丹江口市
- County-level city
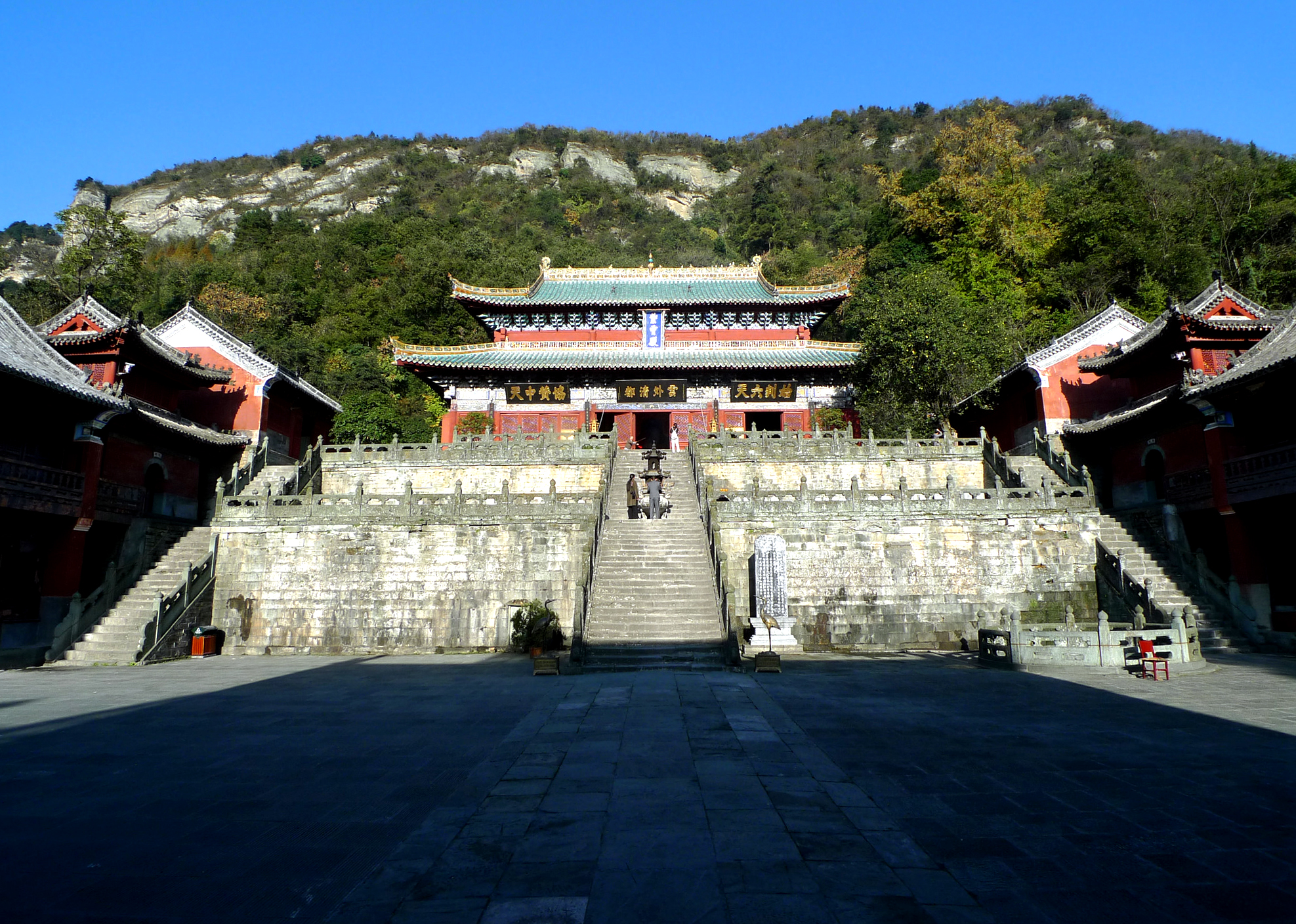
- Zixiao Palace

- Location in Hubei
- Coordinates (Danjiangkou municipal government): 32°32′24″N 111°30′47″E
- Country: People's Republic of China
- Province: Hubei
- Prefecture-level city: Shiyan

Area
  - County-level city: 3,121 km^{2} (1,205 sq mi)
  - Urban: 214.94 km^{2} (82.99 sq mi)

Population (2020)
  - County-level city: 409,940
  - Density: 131.3/km^{2} (340.2/sq mi)
  - Urban: 260,570
- Time zone: UTC+8 (CST)
- Website: djk.gov.cn

Danjiangkou (Chinese: 丹江口; pinyin: Dānjiāngkǒu) is a county-level city in northwestern Hubei, China, bordering Henan province to the northeast. The city spans an area of 3,121 square kilometers, and has a population of approximately 478,000 as of 2017.

== Etymology ==
Danjiangkou translates to the mouth (口; kǒu) of the Dan River (丹江; Dān Jiāng).

== Geography ==
Danjiangkou is located where the Dan River flows into the Han River.

The city proper is situated near the Danjiangkou Dam on this river.

== Climate ==
Climate data for Danjiangkou, elevation 133 m (436 ft), (1991–2020 normals, extremes 1981–2010)
Month	Jan	Feb	Mar	Apr	May	Jun	Jul	Aug	Sep	Oct	Nov	Dec	Year
Record high °C (°F)	21.4 (70.5)	23.8 (74.8)	31.0 (87.8)	35.7 (96.3)	37.8 (100.0)	40.8 (105.4)	40.6 (105.1)	39.8 (103.6)	39.5 (103.1)	34.8 (94.6)	29.1 (84.4)	21.9 (71.4)	40.8 (105.4)
Mean daily maximum °C (°F)	8.2 (46.8)	11.3 (52.3)	16.5 (61.7)	23.1 (73.6)	27.8 (82.0)	31.3 (88.3)	32.7 (90.9)	31.7 (89.1)	27.4 (81.3)	22.4 (72.3)	16.1 (61.0)	10.5 (50.9)	21.6 (70.9)
Daily mean °C (°F)	3.6 (38.5)	6.3 (43.3)	11.1 (52.0)	17.2 (63.0)	22.2 (72.0)	26.1 (79.0)	28.1 (82.6)	27.2 (81.0)	22.8 (73.0)	17.5 (63.5)	11.3 (52.3)	5.8 (42.4)	16.6 (61.9)
Mean daily minimum °C (°F)	0.3 (32.5)	2.7 (36.9)	7.0 (44.6)	12.6 (54.7)	17.8 (64.0)	22.0 (71.6)	24.7 (76.5)	23.9 (75.0)	19.5 (67.1)	14.2 (57.6)	7.9 (46.2)	2.5 (36.5)	12.9 (55.3)
Record low °C (°F)	−7.0 (19.4)	−8.6 (16.5)	−2.9 (26.8)	0.0 (32.0)	8.7 (47.7)	14.4 (57.9)	17.7 (63.9)	15.5 (59.9)	10.1 (50.2)	3.9 (39.0)	−3.4 (25.9)	−9.2 (15.4)	−9.2 (15.4)
Average precipitation mm (inches)	21.2 (0.83)	18.6 (0.73)	42.9 (1.69)	55.7 (2.19)	81.8 (3.22)	85.2 (3.35)	126.5 (4.98)	130.6 (5.14)	84.6 (3.33)	67.5 (2.66)	38.7 (1.52)	15.1 (0.59)	768.4 (30.23)
Average precipitation days (≥ 0.1 mm)	5.8	6.6	8.2	8.9	10.0	9.4	11.6	11.3	10.5	10.0	7.4	5.6	105.3
Average snowy days	4.4	3.1	1.1	0	0	0	0	0	0	0	0.8	2.3	11.7
Average relative humidity (%)	69	68	68	69	68	71	78	78	76	74	73	69	72
Mean monthly sunshine hours	120.1	117.5	150.7	178.7	190.0	180.6	182.5	175.2	141.2	142.0	130.2	126.4	1,835.1
Percentage possible sunshine	38	37	40	46	44	42	42	43	38	41	42	41	41
Source: China Meteorological Administration

== History ==
The area of present-day Danjiangkou belonged to both the Han and the Chu during the Warring States period. After the Warring States period, the area was conquered by the Qin dynasty, which administered the area as Wudang County (武当县; 武當縣), after the nearby Wudang Mountains. Wudang County belonged to the Nanyang Commandery. In 208 CE, the area formed part of the newly established Nanxiang Commandery. In 289 CE, under the Jin Dynasty, the area formed part of the newly established Shunyang Commandery. During the Yongjia rebellion, many refugees from present-day Linfen, Shanxi settled in Wudang County. In 618 CE, Wudang County became part of the newly formed Wudang Commandery (武当郡; 武當郡). In 1119, Wudang Commandery became the Wudang Jun (武当军; 武當軍). In 1276, the Wudang Jun became the Jun Prefecture. In 1476, the area was merged into Xiangyang Fu.

The area remained part of the Jun Prefecture until the establishment of the Republic of China in 1912, which re-organized the Jun Prefecture as Jun County (均县; 均縣). In May 1914, Jun County was assigned to Hubei Circuit. In 1932, it was moved to the province's 11th Administrative Circuit, and was moved to the province's 8th Administrative Circuit in 1936.

On March 21, 1948, the county seat was taken by the People's Liberation Army, and the rest of the county was taken by March 28. On June 2, the Jun County Democratic County Government was established by the Communist Party. With the foundation of the People's Republic of China on October 1, 1949, the county's government was renamed to the Jun County People's Government.

Jun County was briefly revoked in July 1960, and was merged into Guanghua County, before being re-established in 1962. On August 19, 1983, Jun County became the county-level city of Danjiangkou.

== Administrative divisions ==
Danjiangkou is divided into 4 subdistricts, 12 towns, and 5 other township-level divisions. These are subsequently divided into 41 residential communities and 223 administrative villages.

The city's 4 subdistricts are Junzhou Road Subdistrict, Daba Road Subdistrict, Danzhao Road Subdistrict, and Sanguandian Subdistrict.

The city's 12 towns are Tuguanya, Langhe, Dingjiaying, Liuliping, Yanchihe, Junxian, Xijiadian, Haoping, Shigu, Liangshuihe, Guanshan, and Longshan.

The city's 5 other township-level divisions are Xingang Economic Development Management Area, Niuhe Forestry Development Management Area, Baiyangping Forestry Development Management Area, Dagou Forestry Development Management Area, and Wudangshan Tourism Economic Special Zone.

== Economy ==
In 2017, the city's GDP totaled ¥22.514 billion, the government budget totaled ¥2.089 billion, and foreign trade totaled USD 40.7918 million.

=== Tourism ===
The city received 14.91 million tourists in 2017. The Wudang Mountains, which run through the city, have been designated as a 5A Tourist Attraction. The Danjiangkou Reservoir is also a major tourist attraction, and hosts watersports events and serves as a popular fishing spot.

== Transport ==
The Xiangyang–Chongqing railway and the Wuhan–Shiyan Expressway both run through the city. Portions of the Wuhan–Shiyan high-speed railway and the Shiyan-Xichuan Expressway (十淅高速; Shí–Xī Gāosù) are under construction within Danjiangkou as of July 2020.

Danjiangkou is the northwest terminus of the Hankou–Danjiangkou Railway.
