= Fan Tai =

- 范泰
- Born: 355; Xianghua Town, Xichuan County, Henan, Eastern Jin dynasty
- Died: 21 September 428 (aged 73); Liu Song dynasty
- Other names: Bolun (伯倫)
- Occupation: Official
- Children: Fan Ang; Fan Hao; Fan Yan; Fan Ye; Fan Guangyuan
- Father: Fan Ning

Fan Tai (355– 21 September 428), courtesy name Bolun, was an official who served under the Eastern Jin and Liu Song dynasties of China. His fourth son, Fan Ye, wrote the historical text Book of the Later Han.
