= Eupithecia tepida =

Scientific classification
- Kingdom: Animalia
- Phylum: Arthropoda
- Clade: Pancrustacea
- Class: Insecta
- Order: Lepidoptera
- Family: Geometridae
- Genus: Eupithecia
- Species: E. tepida

Binomial name
- Eupithecia tepida Mironov & Galsworthy, 2004

Species of moth

Eupithecia tepida is a moth in the family Geometridae. It is known from the Daba Mountains in Shaanxi, north-western China.

The wingspan is about 19 mm.
