= Dan River (China) =

Dan River (丹江)
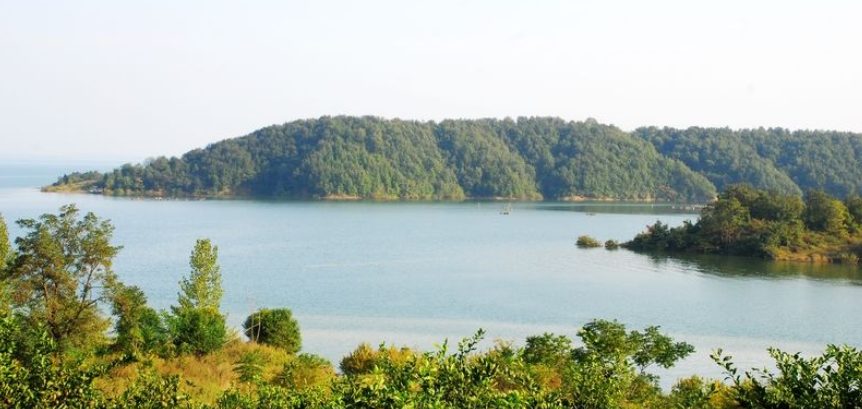
- The Dan River

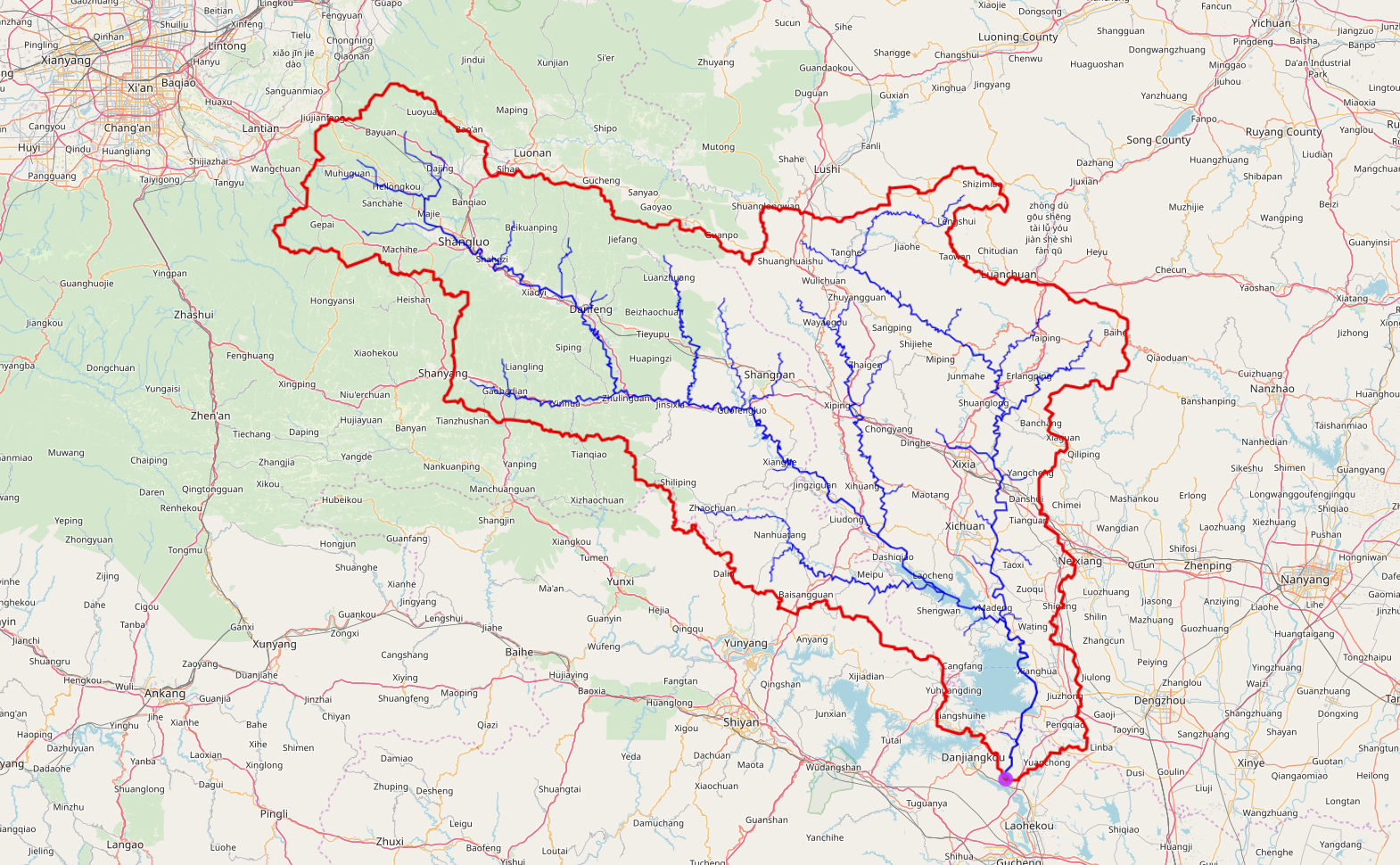

Location
- Country: People's Republic of China

Physical characteristics
- Source
  - location: Heilongkou (黑龙口), Danfeng County, Shaanxi Province
- Length: 443 km (275 mi)
- Basin size: 16,812 km^{2} (6,491 sq mi)

Basin features
- Tributaries
  - right: Laoguan River (老灌河)

The Dan River (Chinese: 丹江; pinyin: Dān Jiāng), formerly known as the Dan Shui (丹水) or 800 Li Black River (八百里黑江), is a river located in Shaanxi province in the People's Republic of China. The longest tributary of the Han River, the Dan rises at Heilongkou (黑龙口) in the Qin Mountains of Shaanxi province then flows south east through Shangluo City, Danfeng County, Shangnan County and Xichuan County, Henan province before joining the Han River at Danjiangkou, Hubei province.

== Origin of the name ==
There are three different theories as to how the Dan River got its name:

- When the Black River (黑水) flooded in ancient times, Yu the Great assigned Dan Zhu the task of bringing it under control. Dan Zhu died during the work so the local people renamed the Black River in his honor.
- Following the Battle of Changping between the States of Qi and Zhao during the Warring States period (771–426 BCE), 400,000 bodies were dumped in the river causing its waters to turn red. Since in Chinese "丹" can mean "red", the river was renamed accordingly.
- Traditionally, the same is said to come from the "Dan fish" (丹鱼), a token of longevity.

== Geography ==
The Dan River Basin is located between 109°30'-112°00' East and 32°30'-34°10' North. Roughly 2,000 metres (6,600 ft) wide, the river flows for 287 kilometres (178 mi) through a basin covering 16,812 square kilometres (6,491 mi^{2}).

== History ==
According to the Yu Gong, the geography section of the Book of Documents, the Dan River joined the Han River at a place called Laohe Kou (老河口 literally: old river mouth).

Later on during and after the Tang dynasty (618–907 CE) under the Fan Zhen (藩镇) or "Buffer Town" system of administration, the Dan River area had the power to block transport on the Huai and Bian Rivers. As a result, the Dan became an important waterway in the Yangtze and Huai River region.

At the time of the Ming dynasty (1368–1644) and later, the Dan was used by merchants of the Guanlong Trading Bloc (关陇集团) to transport goods to Xiangyang and Hankou, both in Hubei Province. At the same time many shipping (船帮会馆) and horse-drawn transportation (马帮会馆) guilds were established at Longju Village (龙驹寨) (modern day Danfeng County, Shaanxi Province), illustrating the flourishing trade on the Dan River.

In 1693, during the reign of the Qing Kangxi Emperor, both Xi'an and Fengxiang County on the Guanzhong Plain suffered crop failure bringing famine to the region. Ding Sikong (丁思孔), governor general of the provinces of Hubei and Guangdong with the assistance of others, sent relief aid from Xiangyang via the Dan River into Shaanxi Province after carrying out dredging operations. Famine reoccurred later during Kangxi's reign in 1720 when 100,000 dan (石), equivalent to 10,000 cubic metres (350,000 cu ft), of rice were shipped to Shaanxi from warehouses in Jingzhou, City, Hubei Province and other locations by boat along the Dan River to Longju Village. A decade later on 16 February 1731, the Yongzheng Emperor ordered grain to be dispatched from Hubei and Guangdong to Shangzhou, Shaanxi as a contingency against food shortages. In 1737, during the Qianlong Emperor's reign, crops failed in Shangzhou and grain prices rocketed. To keep down prices and provide disaster relief, the authorities in Liguanqiao Town (李官桥镇) and Dengzhou City in Xichuan County, Henan procured 1880 dan, equivalent to 188 cubic metres (6,600 cu ft), of foodstuffs which was shipped along the Dan River to Shangzhou. The Qing Guangxu Emperor's reign saw the 1890 occupation of Beijing by the Eight-Nation Alliance following the Boxer Rebellion. The emperor along with Empress Dowager Cixi escaped to Xi'an. Grain taxes from the Jingdai (荆襄) District (south of modern-day Neixiang County, Henan) were forwarded along the Dan River to Longju Village then on to Xi'an for use by the emperor along with his government and army.

With the advent of the Republic of China in 1912, a ballad spread amongst the people of Xichuan County featuring the words "The boatmen have three knives stuck in their stomachs: the river pirates, the bandits and the submerged reefs. They have only three choices: starvation, death by drowning or imprisonment." In turn, the boatmen themselves referred to the Dan as the "Black River", emphasizing the bandit problem. At that time, three relatively large families controlled shipping; those of Ling Laosi (凌老四) from Jingziguan Town (荆紫关镇)，Guo Laopo (郭老婆) from Laocheng Town (老城镇) and Liguanqiao Town's (李官桥镇) Jin Yulou (金玉楼), head of the Red Guild (红帮会). They were all considered leeches and exploiters by the boatmen. Records show that cargoes carried on the Dan River included kerosene, tobacco, chinaware, silk, medicinal ingredients, walnuts, peach kernels (used in Chinese medicine) and specialty products from the mountains.

During the 1940s onwards, waterborne trade on the Dan went into decline.

== Reasons for the decline in trade ==
Three primary factors account for the decline in trade on the Dan River during the previous century. Firstly, wooden sailboats were a relatively backward technology. On the Shangluo section of the waterway a maximum of only four tons could be carried upriver and 10 tons downstream. With calm water, the 167-kilometre (104 mi) round trip from Longju Village to Jingziguan took 20 days and involved heavy physical work with little return. However, in transportation terms, wooden sailboats were quite advanced for the time and there was no better option available. With the rapid growth of rail and road transportation from the early days of the Republic of China the sailboat's days were numbered.
The second factor concerns economic changes that occurred from the 1950s onwards. China's implementation of economic regionalization and a state monopoly on purchasing and marketing effectively severed the upstream/downstream trade links on the Dan River. A decade later the 1962 "Cut off the tail of capitalism" policy (割掉资本主义尾巴) halted part-time shipping activities by the farming community.

Thirdly, with deforestation and the construction of reservoirs the water sources for the Dan River declined. Large quantities of silt in the river bed increased the number of dangerous reefs so that parts of the waterway became impassable.

== Major floods and natural disasters ==
The following are recorded amongst the many natural disasters that have occurred through history in the Dan River region:

Date (Year)	Event
1520	The river flooded, inundating fields and destroying innumerable houses
1572	Floodwater from the Dan reached a depth of 10 metres (33 ft).
1593	Heavy rain began in April and continued until July. Widespread famine.
1606	Heavy flooding, plague epidemic – many dead
1627	Crops damaged by heavy rain, the Dan overflowed
1642	Drought followed by floods, fields destroyed
1644	Heavy rain from August until November caused the Dan to overflow
1658	Rain from August until November causing the Dan to flow in reverse
1667	Large scale flooding
1677	Large scale flooding
1685	Heavy rain, water level above the fields, impossible to plant crops
1722	Heavy rain, large scale flooding, harvest destroyed
1890	The Dan flooded, submerging more than 30 villages
1907	Flooding, many houses damaged
1919	On May 8, heavy rain fell and the river rose sharply, drowning many people
1931	Flood disaster in the summer and autumn, many houses on both banks of the Dan destroyed
1935	On June 6, a flash flood occurred inundating more than 270,000 Chinese acres (16,588 ha) of land. Liguanqiao Town (李官桥镇) submerged in several feet of water. Continuous rain pounded the Songwan (宋湾) region of Tanghe County for seven days and nights.
1943	Rain fell for 49 days during April and May causing the Dan to burst its banks
1950	In the autumn continuous heavy rain fell, Liguanqiao (李官桥) and Bukoujie (埠口街) suffered heavily. The Dan flowed backwards due to the sheer volume of water. In October, the next season's crops were planted in the rain.
1951	At the end of May, heavy rain was followed by hailstorms which destroyed innumerable crops in Jingziguan (荆紫关), Songwan (宋湾), Hushan (岵山) and Liguanqiao (李官桥)
1952	In May, torrential rains caused the Dan to flood damaging fields and houses. As winter approached snow fell for twenty or more days. Sweet potatoes froze in the fields. Three hundred and thirty-seven houses collapsed and 270 oxen perished.
1953	On June 13, torrential rain fell and continued for a month. The Dan River overflowed, drowning ten people, destroying 36,000 Chinese acres (2,211 ha) of crops and causing more than 3,500 houses to collapse.
1954	During July and August heavy rain fell, the Dan rose, reaching a peak flow rate of 10,300 cubic metres (360,000 cu ft) per second. Along the river 52 villages were damaged.
1955	Continuous heavy rain fell during August, flash floods occurred destroying 88,000 Chinese acres (5,406 ha) of crops.
1956	Heavy rain in May caused the Dan to overflow; newly planted wheat rotted in the fields
1957	530 millimetres (21 in) fell in one continuous period destroying 72,000 Chinese acres (4423 ha) of crops and causing 3,000 houses to collapse. The Dan reached a peak flow rate of 10,800 cubic metres (380,000 cu ft) per second
