= Chihe =

Chihe (池河) may refer to:

- Chi River (China), tributary of the Hanshui
- Chihe, Anhui, town in Dingyuan County
- Chihe, Shaanxi, town in Shiquan County
  - Chihe Station, on the Yangpingguan–Ankang Railway in Chihe, Shaanxi
