= Jing Mountains =

Mountain range in Hubei, China

Jingshan 荆山
- Location within China

Highest point
- Peak: Julong (聚龙山)
- Elevation: 1,852 m (6,076 ft)

Geography
- Country: China
- Province: Hubei
- Range coordinates: 31°28′N 111°29′E

The Jingshan or Jing Mountains (Chinese: 荆山) are a chain of mountains in the western part of Nanzhang County, Hubei Province, People’s Republic of China. Stretching for around 150 kilometers, their peaks range in height from 1200 to about 1800 meters above sea level with the highest peak, Mount Julong (聚龙山), reaching an elevation of 1852 meters.

The Jingshan Mountains can be thought of as the easternmost extension of the Daba Mountains, separating the basin of the Han River (a tributary of the Yangtze) in the north from the rest of the Yangtze basin (in the south).

The River Ju (沮河) and River Zhang (漳河), both tributaries of the Yangtze River as well as the Han River tributary the River Man (蛮河) have their source in the Jingshan Mountains.

In ancient times, the Jingshan Mountains were at the heart of the Zhou dynasty (1046–256 BCE) vassal State of Chu.

== See also ==
- Shennongjia Massif - to the west
- Wudang Mountains - to the northwest
