= Eupithecia andrasi =

Scientific classification
- Kingdom: Animalia
- Phylum: Arthropoda
- Clade: Pancrustacea
- Class: Insecta
- Order: Lepidoptera
- Family: Geometridae
- Genus: Eupithecia
- Species: E. andrasi

Binomial name
- Eupithecia andrasi Mironov & Galsworthy, 2004

Species of moth

Eupithecia andrasi is a moth in the family Geometridae. It is found in north-western China in the Shaanxi province. The holotype was collected in 1936 in the Daba Mountains at about 3,000 m (9,800 ft) above sea level.

The wingspan is about 18 mm. The fore- and hindwings are pale buff.
