= Jiuchong =

Jiuchong 九重镇
- Town
- Location in Henan
- Coordinates: 32°41′49.84″N 111°47′33.92″E
- Country: People's Republic of China
- Province: Henan
- Prefecture-level city: Nanyang
- County: Xichuan

Area
  - Total: 134 km^{2} (52 sq mi)

Population (2008)
  - Total: 54,000
  - Density: 400/km^{2} (1,000/sq mi)
- Time zone: UTC+8 (China Standard)
- Postal code: 474475
- Area code: 0377
- Website: jiuchong.xichuan.gov.cn

Jiuchong (Chinese: 九重; pinyin: Jiǔchóng), also known as Danyang (simplified Chinese: 丹阳; traditional Chinese: 丹陽; pinyin: Dānyáng), is a town in the southeast of Xichuan County, southwestern Henan province, China.

== Geography ==
Jiuchong town is situated at the Southeastern part of Xichuan County. The central route of South–North Water Transfer Project's canal head is located in the west of Jiuchong town.

== Name ==
In year 1368, Zhu Yuanzhang attacked the Yuan capital Dadu (present-day Beijing), and overthrowed the Yuan Dynasty. Some royal family of Yuan Dynasty fled here and establish a Nine heavy yard, Nine heavy yard in Chinese is Jiuchong Yuan. that is the origin of Jiuchong.
