= Xianghua =

Xianghua may refer to:

== Geography ==
- Xianghua, Xichuan County (香花镇), town in Henan
- Xianghua, Chongming County (向化镇), town in Chongming County, Shanghai

== Languages ==
- Xiang Chinese (湘话), or Hunanese
- Xianghua dialect (乡话) or Waxiang Chinese, spoken in northwestern Hunan
- Danzhou dialect, a dialect of Yue Chinese (Cantonese) around Danzhou, Hainan

== Others ==
- Chai Xianghua, character in the Soulcalibur series of fighting games produced by Namco
