= Danjiangkou Dam =

- Map of reservoir (dam in red)

- Location within China
- Country: China
- Location: Danjiangkou
- Coordinates: 32°33′22″N 111°29′17″E
- Construction began: 1958
- Opening date: 1973

Dam and spillways
- Impounds: Han river
- Height: 111.6 m (366 ft)
- Length: 2,494 m (8,182 ft)
- Elevation at crest: 176.6 m (579 ft)

Reservoir
- Creates: Danjiangkou Reservoir
- Total capacity: 17,450,000,000 m^{3} (14,146,945 acre⋅ft)

Power Station
- Commission date: 1968-1973
- Turbines: 6 x 150 MW
- Installed capacity: 900 MW

The Danjiangkou Dam (Chinese: 丹江口大坝; pinyin: Dānjiāngkǒu Dàbà) is a concrete gravity dam on the Han river near Danjiangkou in Hubei Province, China. The original dam was constructed between 1958 and 1973. The dam creates a large Danjiangkou Reservoir.

In the 21st century, the Danjiangkou Dam became part of the South-North Water Transfer Project. In 2005–2009, its height was raised in order to increase the reservoir's capacity.

== Heightening ==
Originally, the dam was 97 m (318 ft) tall and 2,494 m (8,182 ft) long. Since its heightening, the dam is now 111.6 m (366 ft) tall and 3,442 m (11,293 ft) long. The original crest elevation was 162 m (531 ft) and is now 176.6 m (579 ft). The increase in height will add 11,600,000,000 m^{3} (9,404,273 acre⋅ft) to the reservoir's capacity bring it to 29,050,000,000 m^{3} (23,551,218 acre⋅ft). Currently, the reservoir has a capacity of 17,450,000,000 m^{3} (14,146,945 acre⋅ft).

The dam's power plant also contains 6 x 150 MW turbine generators for an installed capacity of 900 MW. This will increase with the heightened reservoir.

== See also ==
- List of power stations in China
- Hankou–Danjiangkou railway
