= Eupithecia molybdaena =

Scientific classification
- Kingdom: Animalia
- Phylum: Arthropoda
- Clade: Pancrustacea
- Class: Insecta
- Order: Lepidoptera
- Family: Geometridae
- Genus: Eupithecia
- Species: E. molybdaena

Binomial name
- Eupithecia molybdaena Mironov & Galsworthy, 2004

Species of moth

Eupithecia molybdaena is a moth in the family Geometridae. It is known from the Daba Mountains in Shaanxi, western China.

The wingspan is about 17 mm. The fore- and hindwings are pale brown.
