= Fuyu =

Fuyu may refer to:

- Fuyu Kyrgyz language, the easternmost Turkic language
- Koguryoic languages, also called the Buyeo languages, a group of Koreanic languages spoken in Korea and Manchuria mentioned in ancient Chinese sources
- Buyeo, an ancient kingdom in Manchuria, also rendered as Fuyu based on Hanyu Pinyin romanization

== China ==
- Fuyu, Jilin (扶余), city in Jilin
- Fuyu County, Heilongjiang (富裕县)
  - Fuyu Town (富裕镇), seat of Fuyu County
- Xueting Fuyu (雪庭福裕), a Shaolin Temple abbot of the 13th century
- Mount Fuyu, a former name of Bozhong Mountain in Shaanxi, the source of the Han River
- Fuyu–Nenjiang railway single-track railroad in northeastern China

People

- Li Fuyu (李富玉), Chinese road bicycle racer
- Yang Fuyu Chinese biochemist, biophysicist, and writer
- Wang Fuyu (王富玉), Chinese politician

== Japan ==
- Fuyu persimmon, a type of Japanese persimmon or Diospyros kaki
- Iha Fuyū (伊波 普猷, 1876–1947), Japanese scholar who had a profound impact on the study of Okinawa
- Fuyu Yoshida (吉田 冬優, born 1997), Japanese swimmer

== Taiwan ==
- Fuyu Oriental Crown (富宇東方之冠), a residential skyscraper in Taichung
