= Xichuan County =

Xichuan County 淅川县 Sichwan
- County
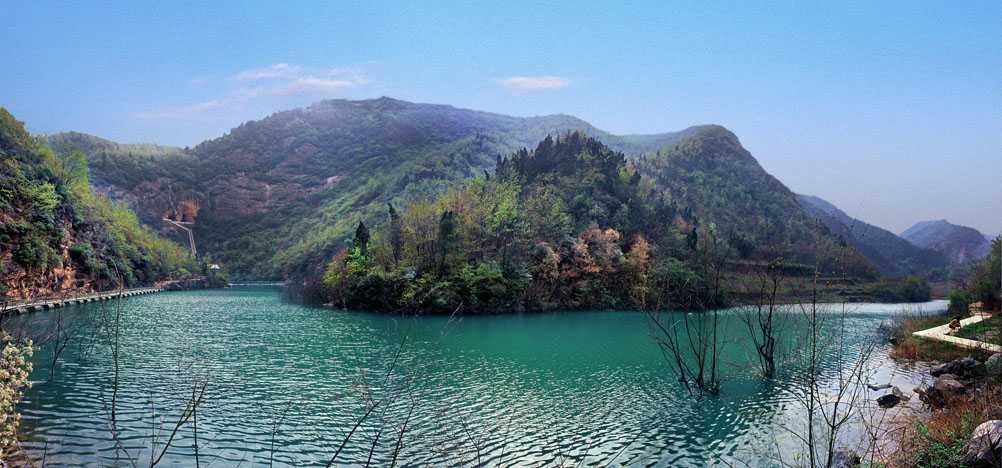

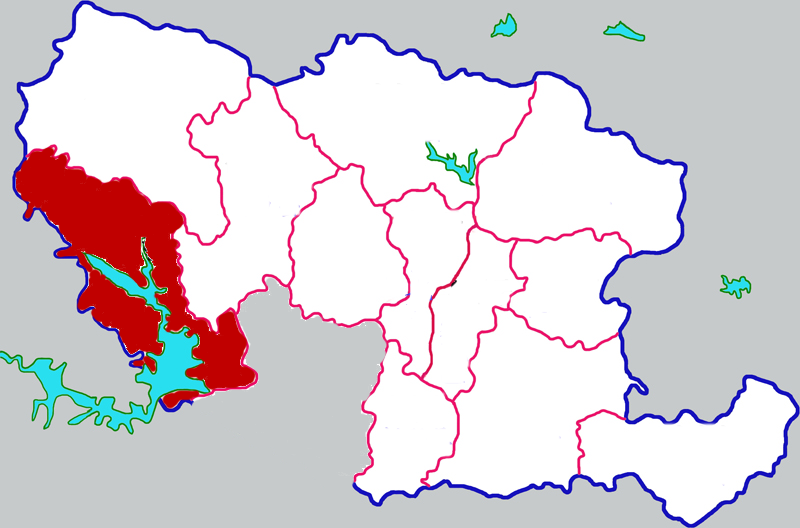
- Xichuan in Nanyang

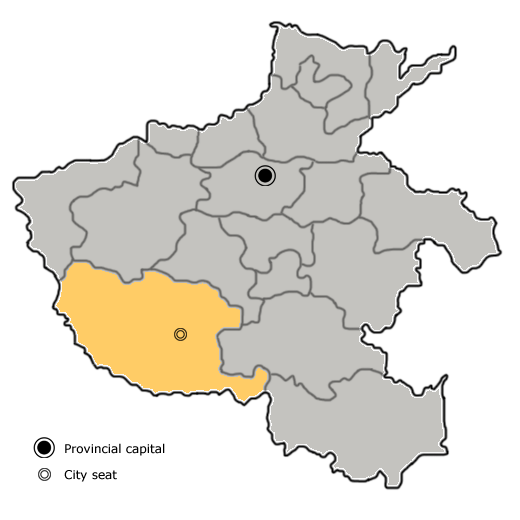
- Nanyang in Henan (note the map includes the sub-prefectural city of Dengzhou)
- Coordinates: 33°08′17″N 111°29′28″E
- Country: People's Republic of China
- Province: Henan
- Prefecture-level city: Nanyang

Area
  - Total: 2,817 km^{2} (1,088 sq mi)

Population (2019)
  - Total: 626,100
  - Density: 222.3/km^{2} (575.6/sq mi)
- Time zone: UTC+8 (China Standard)
- Postal code: 474450
- Area code: 0377
- Website: www.xichuan.gov.cn

Xichuan County (Chinese: 淅川县; pinyin: Xīchuān Xiàn) is a county in the southwest of Henan province, China, bordering the provinces of Hubei to the south and Shaanxi to the northwest. It is under the administration of the prefecture-level city of Nanyang.

Xichuan has an area of 2,798 km^{2} (1,080 sq mi) and a population of 746,000. Both of the Danjiangkou Reservoir and the Central route of South–North Water Transfer Project's canal head are located in Xichuan.

== History ==
The state of Chu's first capital Danyang was likely at the intersection of Shaanxi, Henan and Hubei, near modern day Xichuan.

== Geography ==
Xichuan is located south of Funiu Mountain. The county is about 107 kilometers from northwest to southeast, with a width of 46 kilometers and a total area of 2,798 square kilometers. Xichuan County is a horseshoe-shaped terrain that protrudes to the southeast in the northwest direction. The northwest is a low mountain area, the middle is a hilly area, and the southeast is a hilly and alluvial plain. Danjiangkou Reservoir is located in the south of the county. The northern and northwestern parts of the county belong to the eastern part of the Qinling mountains. On the south side of the Funiu Mountains, the mountain body is roughly east–west. The mountains about 900 meters above sea level extend from north to south. There are the Daba Mountains in the west and southwest of the county. The elevation of the east and west peaks at the junction of Zoumaling and Hubei is 1,033 meters. 1086 meters is the highest peak of the county. The east side of the Danjiangkou Reservoir belongs to the southwestern margin of the Nanyang Basin and is flat and ridge-like.

== Climate ==
Climate data for Xichuan, elevation 248 m (814 ft), (1991–2020 normals, extremes 1981–present)
Month	Jan	Feb	Mar	Apr	May	Jun	Jul	Aug	Sep	Oct	Nov	Dec	Year
Record high °C (°F)	20.6 (69.1)	24.3 (75.7)	34.7 (94.5)	35.6 (96.1)	39.3 (102.7)	40.9 (105.6)	40.2 (104.4)	39.1 (102.4)	40.5 (104.9)	34.5 (94.1)	30.4 (86.7)	23.0 (73.4)	40.9 (105.6)
Mean daily maximum °C (°F)	8.2 (46.8)	10.9 (51.6)	17.3 (63.1)	23.2 (73.8)	27.9 (82.2)	31.2 (88.2)	32.6 (90.7)	31.9 (89.4)	26.9 (80.4)	22.1 (71.8)	15.5 (59.9)	10.4 (50.7)	21.5 (70.7)
Daily mean °C (°F)	2.6 (36.7)	5.3 (41.5)	11.2 (52.2)	16.8 (62.2)	21.7 (71.1)	25.6 (78.1)	27.7 (81.9)	26.8 (80.2)	21.9 (71.4)	16.5 (61.7)	10.1 (50.2)	4.5 (40.1)	15.9 (60.6)
Mean daily minimum °C (°F)	−1.4 (29.5)	1.3 (34.3)	6.4 (43.5)	11.4 (52.5)	16.5 (61.7)	20.8 (69.4)	23.8 (74.8)	22.9 (73.2)	18.2 (64.8)	12.5 (54.5)	6.3 (43.3)	0.3 (32.5)	11.6 (52.8)
Record low °C (°F)	−8.5 (16.7)	−8.5 (16.7)	−3.5 (25.7)	0.2 (32.4)	5.9 (42.6)	13.6 (56.5)	15.4 (59.7)	15.5 (59.9)	10.3 (50.5)	−0.3 (31.5)	−4.3 (24.3)	−12.2 (10.0)	−12.2 (10.0)
Average precipitation mm (inches)	15.9 (0.63)	16.6 (0.65)	38.3 (1.51)	53.2 (2.09)	78.3 (3.08)	94.5 (3.72)	155.1 (6.11)	132.5 (5.22)	97.7 (3.85)	61.7 (2.43)	33.1 (1.30)	11.9 (0.47)	788.8 (31.06)
Average precipitation days (≥ 0.1 mm)	5.0	5.4	7.7	8.7	9.6	9.4	12.7	12.2	10.8	9.5	6.7	4.9	102.6
Average snowy days	4.3	3.1	1.0	0.1	0	0	0	0	0	0	0.7	2.2	11.4
Average relative humidity (%)	65	64	63	65	63	66	75	77	75	72	71	65	68
Mean monthly sunshine hours	109.2	106.7	140.5	169.5	175.3	167.5	165.3	165.9	135.9	131.1	124.8	123.7	1,715.4
Percentage possible sunshine	34	34	38	43	41	39	38	41	37	38	40	40	39
Source: China Meteorological Administration

== Administrative divisions ==
Xichuan has 2 subdistricts, 11 towns, and 4 townships its jurisdiction:

Subdistricts

- Longcheng Subdistrict (龙城街道), Shangsheng Subdistrict (商圣街道)

Towns

- Jingziguan (荆紫关镇), Laocheng (老城镇), Xianghua (香花镇), Houpo (厚坡镇), Jiuchong (九重镇), Shengwan (盛湾镇), Jinhe (金河镇), Siwan (寺湾镇), Cangfang (仓房镇), Shangji (上集镇), Madeng (马蹬镇)

Townships

- Xihuang Township (西簧乡), Maotang Township (毛堂乡), Dashiqiao Township (大石桥乡), Taohe Township (滔河乡)

== Notable people ==
- Fan Li, the politician and economist of the country in the late Spring and Autumn period.
- Fan Ye, famous historian and essayist in the Southern Song dynasty.
- Fan Zhen, (about 450 years - 515 years), materialist philosopher, atheist.
- Famous poet Chou Meng-tieh was born in Xichuan County in 1921.
