= Fan Ye (historian) =

5th-century Chinese historian (398-446)

- Traditional Chinese: 范曄
- Simplified Chinese: 范晔
Transcriptions
Standard Mandarin
- Hanyu Pinyin: Fàn Yè
- Wade–Giles: Fan Yeh

Fan Ye (398 – 23 January 446), courtesy name Weizong (蔚宗), was a Chinese historian, philosopher, and politician of the Liu Song dynasty during the Southern and Northern dynasties period. He was the compiler of the historical text Book of the Later Han, which he compiled during his tenure as Administrator of Xuancheng (宣城太守). The fourth son of Fan Tai (范泰), Fan Ye was born in present-day Shaoxing, Zhejiang, but his ancestral home was in Nanyang, Henan. After his birth, he was made heir of his father's cousin Fan Hongzhi (范弘之).

He was a noted atheist who heavily criticised Buddhism, Yin and Yang, and the concept of the Mandate of Heaven. To this end, he cited Zhang Heng's scientific studies as evidence.

In January 446, Fan Ye was accused of rebellion and executed, along with many associates including his son Fan Ai (范藹).

== Appearance and personality ==
The Book of Song described Fan as "less than seven chi in height, fat and dark in complexion, with no eyebrows or beard".

When Fan Ye was young, his elder brother Fan Yan (范晏) frequently mentioned that Fan Ye was drawn towards advancing his interests and that this habit would bring disaster to their clan, which was what eventually happened.
