= Muma River =

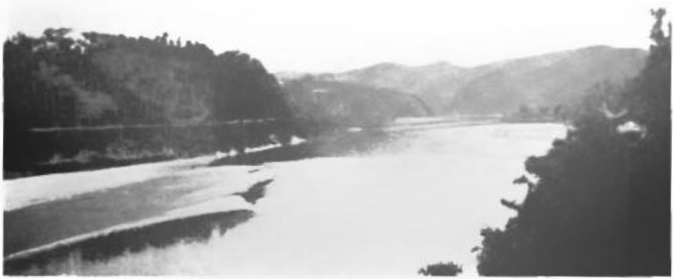
- The Muma River above the town of Xixiang (Hsihsiang) about 1917

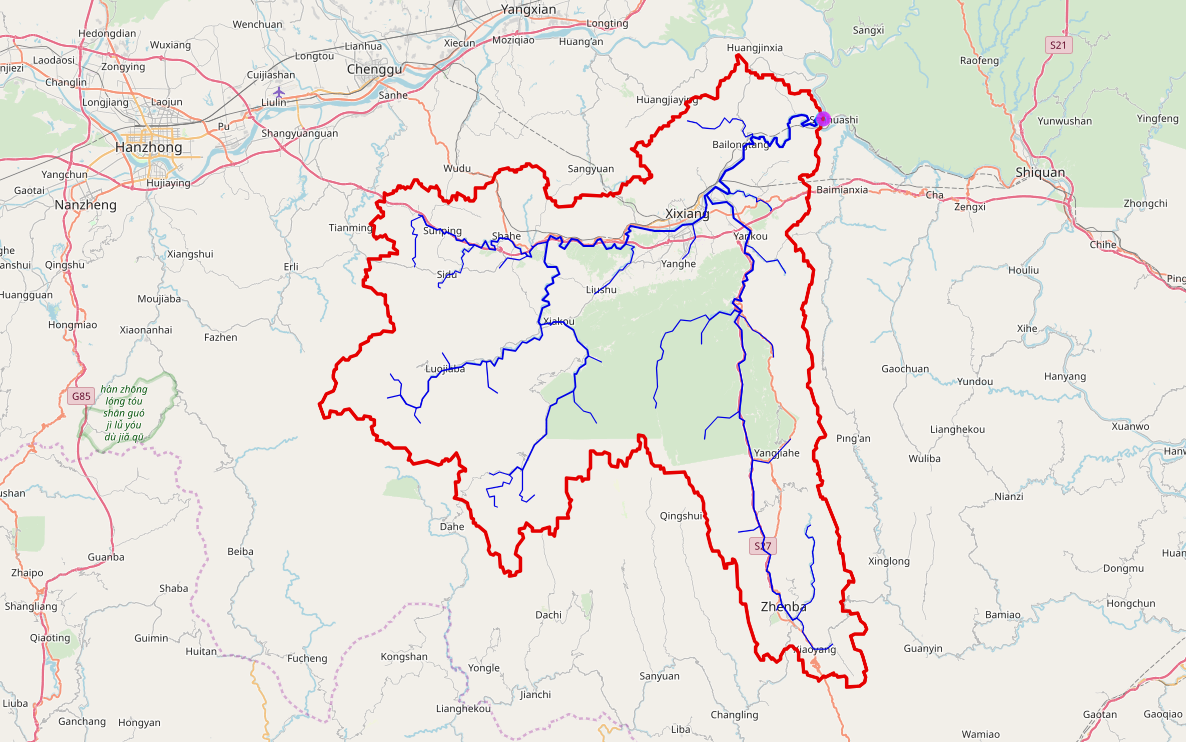

- Location within China

Location
- Country: China
- Province: Shaanxi

The Muma River (Muma He 牧马河, literally, Herd Horse River) is a right tributary of the Han River in the Yangtze river basin of northern China. It has a length of 128 kilometres (80 mi) and a drainage area of 2,782 square kilometres (1,074 mi^{2}). It originates in and flows entirely within Xixiang County of Shaanxi Province. The annual average flow is 45 cubic metres per second (1,600 cu ft/s). It has a natural drop of 1,613 metres (5,292 ft) and water reserves of 90,000 kilowatts. It arises near the border with Sichuan Province at 32°45′23″N 107°22′15″E, flows northwest and debouches into the Han River at 33°05′47″N 107°56′51″E.

The main branch of the Muma River is navigable by small boats as far south as the village of Matsung T'an.
