= Jingziguan =

- Town
- 荊紫關鎮
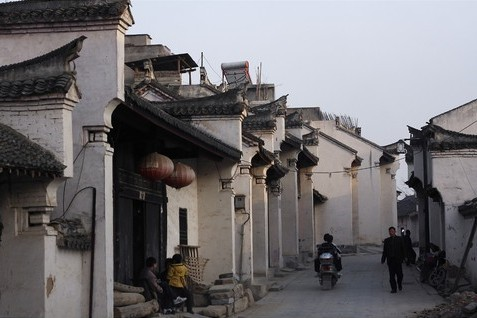

- Location within Henan
- Coordinates: 33°14′51.84″N 111°1′28.45″E
- Country: China
- Province: Henan
- Prefecture: Nanyang
- County: Xichuan County
- Time zone: UTC+8 (China Standard)
- Area code: 474400

Jingziguan (simplified Chinese: 荆紫关; traditional Chinese: 荊紫關; pinyin: jīngzǐguān) is a town in Xichuan County, Nanyang City, Henan province, China.

== Geography ==
Jingziguan is located at the junction of Henan province, Shaanxi province and Hubei province of Central China.

== Gallery ==
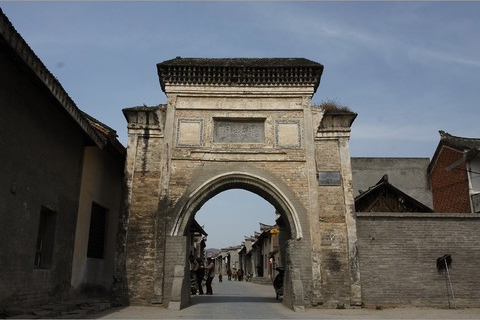
The door of Jingziguan

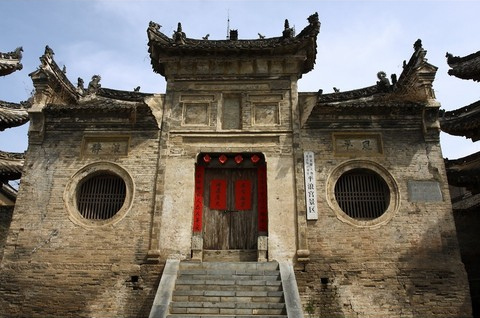
Pinglang palace

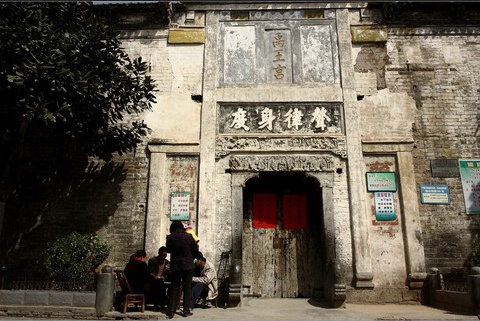
Yuwang palace

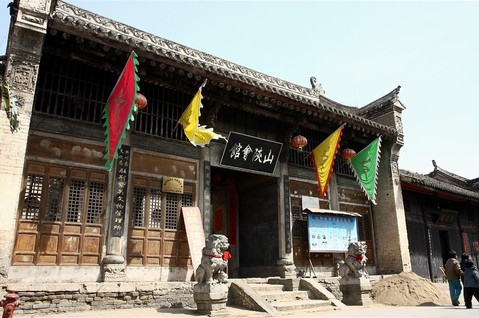
Shanshan meeting room

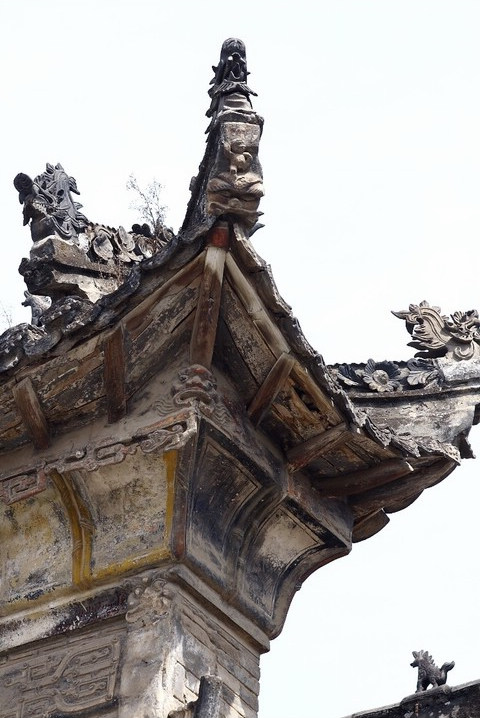
Old building

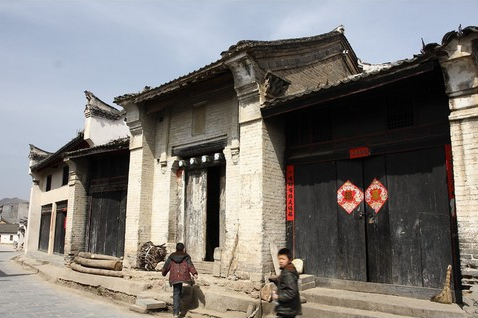
House

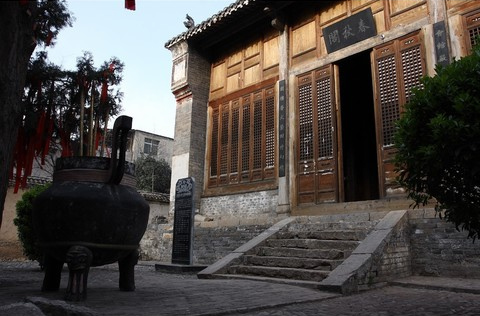
Pavilion
