= Danjiangkou Reservoir =

- Location within Hubei
- Location: Henan and Hubei, China
- Coordinates: 32°43′8.39″N 111°33′3.20″E
- Type: reservoir
- Primary inflows: Dan River
- Primary outflows: Han River

Danjiangkou Reservoir (simplified Chinese: 丹江口水库; traditional Chinese: 丹江口水庫; pinyin: Dānjiāngkǒu Shuǐkù) is a multi-purpose reservoir in Xichuan County, Henan and Danjiangkou City, Hubei province, Central China. Created by the Danjiangkou Dam, it serves as a supply of water for the region as well as for irrigation, electricity generation, flood control and aquaculture. The reservoir can be divided in two branches, formed by the Han River and Dan River, each having a similar storage capacity.

== History ==
It was constructed in 1958, and at the time it was the 3rd largest reservoirs in Asia and the largest in China. 160,000 residents were relocated to make way for the reservoir. The ruins of the ancient city of Junzhou (Chinese: 均州城) were also flooded.

During filling of the reservoir between 1970 and 1973 several reservoir induced earthquakes were detected up to a 4.7 magnitude shock. After the reservoir was completely filled, no further induced tremors were detected.

Between 2005 and 2009, the dam was raised to facilitate the connection to the South-North Water Transfer Project. By 2014 the water level reached its new designed height of 170 meter, from the original 157 meter. The water surface area was expanded from 700 to 1,000 km² and the storage capacity from 17.45 billion cubic meters to 29.05 billion cubic meters. Over 345,000 people had to be relocated to allow this expansion.

== Ecology ==
The reservoir holds economic importance for aquaculture. After measures to combat overfishing were introduced, populations of black carp, fishes of the genus Xenocypris, Chinese perch, yellow catfish, wild ducks, egrets and otters have recovered.

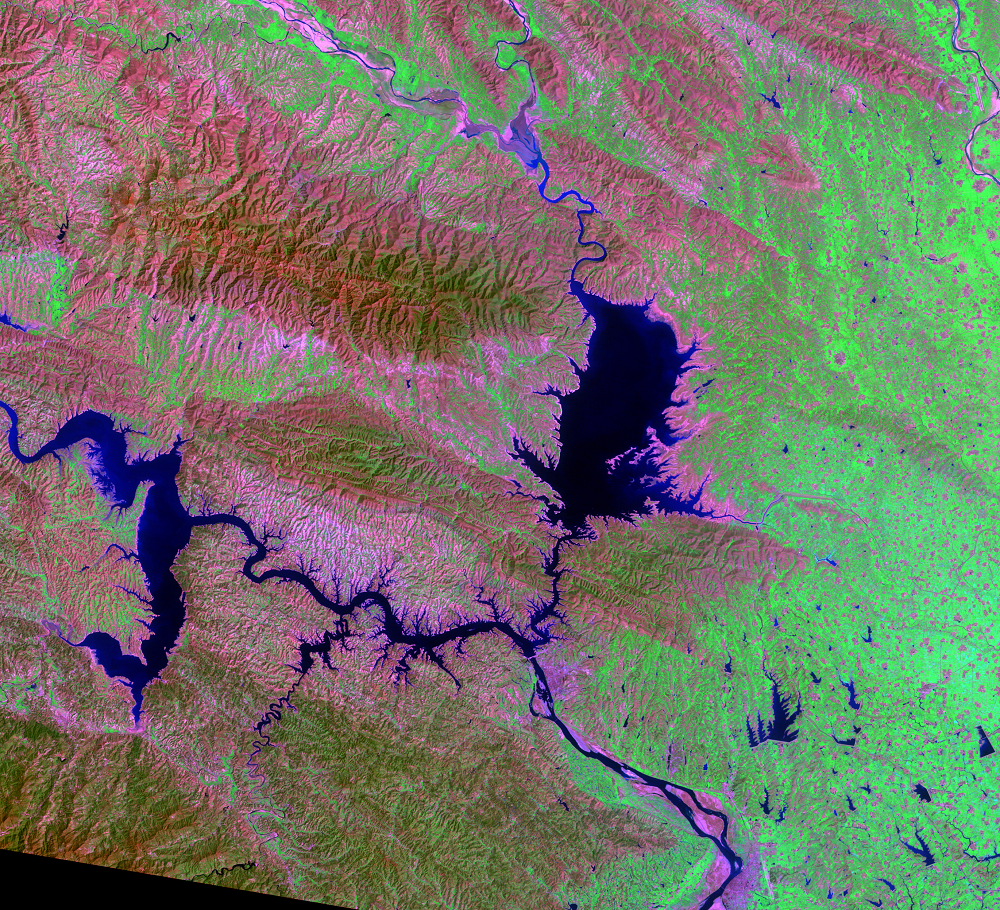
False color image of the reservoir in 1987

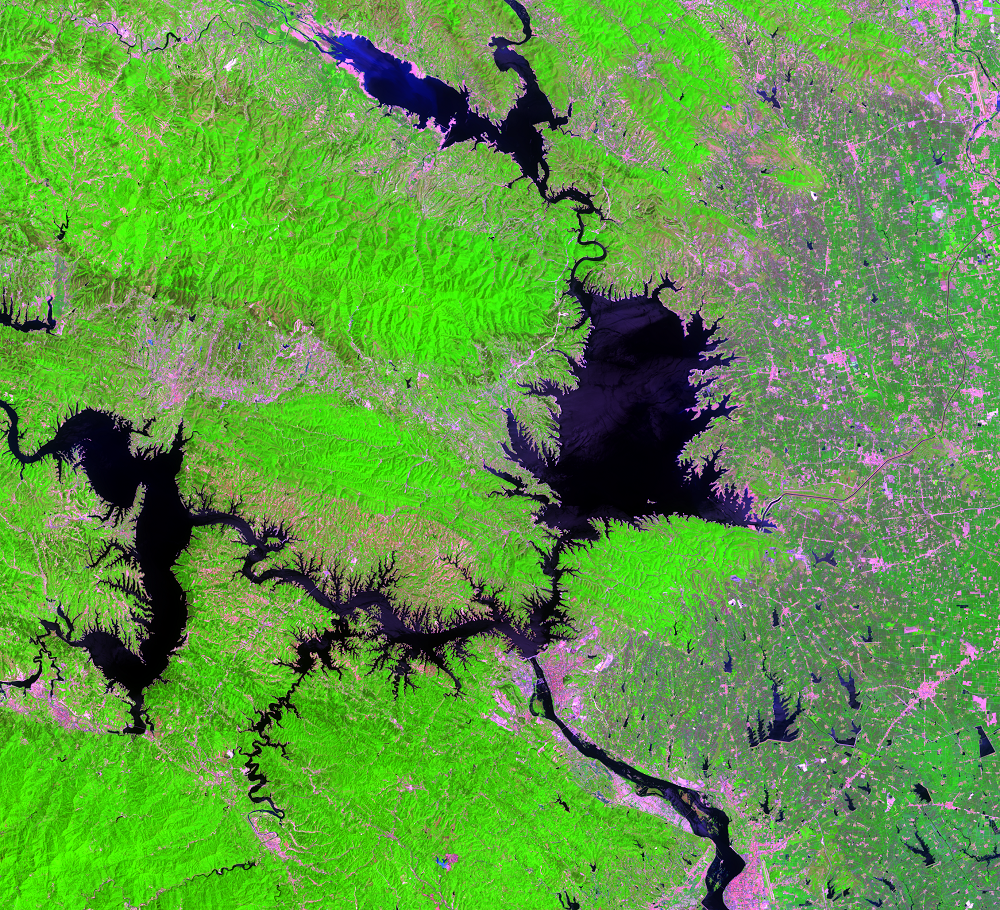
With heightened dam and water level in 2023
