= Siwan, Henan =

Siwan 寺湾镇
- Town
- Location in Henan
- Coordinates: 33°10′13″N 111°7′59″E
- Country: People's Republic of China
- Province: Henan
- Prefecture-level city: Nanyang
- County: Xichuan County
- Time zone: UTC+8 (China Standard)

Siwan (Chinese: 寺湾; pinyin: Sìwān) is a town under the administration of Xichuan County, Henan, China. As of 2020, it administers Qianjin Residential Community (前进社区) and the following 29 villages, namely:

- Shangjie Village (上街村)
- Qinjiagou Village (秦家沟村)
- Yuanlinghuai Village (园岭怀村)
- Dahuashan Village (大花山村)
- Dujiayao Village (杜家窑村)
- Laozhuang Village (老庄村)
- Xiawan Village (夏湾村)
- Yang'ao Village (杨凹村)
- Xiajie Village (下街村)
- Qianying Village (前营村)
- Xiying Village (西营村)
- Sunjiatai Village (孙家台村)
- Sunjiapu Village (孙家铺村)
- Bogeyu Village (鹁鸽峪村)
- Huoxingmiao Village (火星庙村)
- Gaowan Village (高湾村)
- Shangjiagou Village (上贾沟村)
- Danggang Village (党岗村)
- Qingliangsi Village (清凉寺村)
- Shuitianyu Village (水田峪村)
- Chenjiashan Village (陈家山村)
- Luogang Village (罗岗村)
- Laomiao Village (老庙村)
- Dujiahe Village (杜家河村)
- Huanglianshu Village (黄楝树村)
- Zhaohe Village (赵河村)
- Sanquangou Village (三泉沟村)
- Dayugou Village (大峪沟村)
- Liulingou Village (柳林沟村)
