= Irreligion in China =

Religion in China (CFPS 2014) (Note: CFPS 2014 surveyed a sample of 13,857 families and 31,665 individuals. As noted by Katharina Wenzel-Teuber of China Zentrum, German institute for research on religion in China, compared to CFPS 2012, CFPS 2014 asked the Chinese about personal belief in certain conceptions of divinity (i.e. "Buddha", "Tao", "Allah", "God of the Christians/Jesus", "Heavenly Lord of the Catholics") rather than membership in a religious group. It also included regions, such as those in the west of China, that were excluded in CFPS 2012, and unregistered Christians. For these reasons, she concludes that CFPS 2014 results are more accurate than 2012 ones.)
1. Chinese folk religion / unaffiliated (73.6%)
2. Buddhism (15.9%)
3. Other religious organisations, including folk sects and the Taoist Church (Note: CFPS 2014 found that 5.94% of the population declared that they belonged to "other" religious categories besides the five state-sanctioned religions. An additional 0.85% of the population responded that they were "Taoists". Note that the title of "Taoist", in common Chinese usage, is generally attributed only to the Taoist clergy. CFPS 2014 found that a further 0.81% declared that they belonged to the popular sects, while CFPS 2012 found 2.2%, and CGSS 2006-2010 surveys found an average 3% of the population declaring that they belonged to such religions, while government estimates give higher figures (see the "statistics" section of the present article).) (7.60%)
4. Christianity (2.53%)
5. Islam (Note: CFPS 2014 surveyed predominantly people of Han ethnicity. This may have resulted in an underestimation of Muslims. CGSS 2006–2010 surveys found an average 2-3% of the population of China declaring to be Muslim.) (0.45%)

China has the world's largest irreligious population, with the government of the People's Republic adhering to the doctrine of state atheism. Successive Chinese polities since the Qing dynasty have conducted antireligious campaigns to discourage folk religious practices, and the government maintains an official attitude of secularism and non-promotion.

Since 1978, the constitution provides for religious freedom: "No state organ, public organization or individual may compel citizens to believe in, or not to believe in, any religion; nor may they discriminate against citizens because they do, or do not believe in religion" (article 36). Among the general population a wide variety of religiousity is practiced. Most Chinese frequently engage in incense burning, paper-money offering, tomb-kneeing, oracle-seeking, temple-visiting, or horoscope-consulting. China officially recognizes five religions - Buddhism, Taoism, Islam, Catholicism, and Protestantism - managed by the State Administration for Religious Affairs of the United Front Work Department.

According to a 2012 Gallup poll, 47% of Chinese people were convinced atheists, and a further 30% were not religious. In comparison, only 14% considered themselves to be religious. More recently, a 2015 Gallup poll found the number of convinced atheists in China to be 61%, with a further 29% saying that they are not religious compared to just 7% who are religious.

== History ==
While in modern history, the Taiping Rebellion, Boxer Rebellion, Communist Revolution, and the Cultural Revolution contributed significantly to the rise of irreligion and distrust of organized religion among the general populace, irreligion in its various forms, especially rationalism, secularism, and state atheism, has had a long history in China. The Zhou dynasty Classic of Poetry contains several catechistic poems in the Decade of Dang questioning the authority or existence of Shangdi. Later philosophers such as Xun Zi, Fan Zhen, Han Fei, Zhang Zai, and Wang Fuzhi also criticized the religious practices prevalent during their times. Buddhism flourished in China during the Southern and Northern dynasties period. It was during this period that Fan Zhen wrote Shen Mie Lun (Simplified Chinese 神灭论, Traditional Chinese 神滅論, "On the Annihilation of the Shen") in reaction to Buddhist concepts of body-soul dualism, samsara and karma. He wrote that the soul is merely an effect or function of the body, and that there is no soul without the body (i.e., after the destruction and death of the body). Further, he considered that cause-and-effect relationships that were claimed to be evidence of karma were merely the result of coincidence and bias.

Confucianism as a state-instituted philosophy has flourished in China since the Han dynasty, and the perspectives it offered provided ground for atheist development. While there were periods in which Taoism and Buddhism may have been officially promoted, the status of Confucianism in Chinese society had rarely been challenged during imperial times. Extensive study of the Confucian Classics was required to pass the Imperial Civil Service Examinations, and this was the major (and often sole) means by which one could achieve prominence in society. Confucianism places particular emphasis on humanistic and this-worldly social relations, rather than on an otherworldly soteriology. This produced a cultural tendency that facilitated acceptance of modern forms of irreligion such as humanism, secularism, and atheism.

Zhu Xi, one of the most important Confucian philosophers, encouraged an agnostic tendency within Confucianism, because he believed that the Supreme Ultimate was a rational principle. He discussed it as an intelligent and ordering will behind the universe, while stating that "Heaven and Earth have no mind of their own" their only function was to produce things. Whether this can be considered a conscious or intelligent will is clearly up for debate.

China is considered to be a nation with a long history of humanism, secularism, and this-worldly thought since the time of Confucius, (Note: Some scholars consider Confucianism as humanist and secularist. Rather, Herbert Fingarette has described it as a religion that "sacralises the secular".) who stressed shisu (世俗 "being in the world"). Hu Shih stated in the 1920s that "China is a country without religion and the Chinese are a people who are not bound by religious superstitions."

In the 19th century, after China's defeat in the First Opium War and in successive wars, the country succumbed to increasing domination by foreign imperialist powers. The Boxers (or the Yihetuan) considered Christian missionaries as promoting foreign influence in China and held deep anti-Christian views. Orthodox, Catholic and Protestant missionaries and church members were massacred.

In the 1920s, the Anti-Christian Movement (非基督教运动) was an intellectual and political movement in the Republic of China. The May Fourth Movement for a New Culture attacked religion of all sorts, including Confucianism and Buddhism, as well as Christianity, rejecting all as superstition. The various movements were also inspired by modernizing attitudes deriving from both nationalist and socialist ideologies, as well as feeding on older anti-Christian sentiment that was in large part due to repeated invasions of China by Western countries.

During the Nanjing Decade, the Nationalists promoted secularism and enacted a series of campaigns to eliminate activities deemed superstitious.

According to Mao Zedong, theism, patriarchy, and bourgeois authority all reinforced each other and combined to keep the peasantry oppressed. In this view, eliminating superstition was necessary for the liberation of the Chinese people.

During the Cultural Revolution, a radical policy of anti-religion and anti-tradition was instituted. In the ensuing decade, the five major religions in China were severely suppressed. Many religious organizations were disbanded, property was confiscated or damaged, monks and nuns were sent home (or killed in violent struggle sessions).

Since the reform and opening up of 1979, the government has liberalized religious policies to a degree, and the religious population has experienced some growth. Nevertheless, the irreligious remain the majority among all age groups in China. The CCP may even support certain local religious institutions and festivals in a bid to promote Chinese unification such as Mazu. However, the doctrine of state atheism, characterization of religion as superstition, and promotion of scientific materialism remain core tenets of the ruling CCP. Members of the CCP are required to be atheists.

== See also ==
- Antireligious campaigns of the Chinese Communist Party
- Chinese folk religion
- Heterodox teachings (Chinese law)
- Freedom of religion in China
- Religion in China
