= Xianghua, Henan =

Xianghua 香花
- Town
- 香花鎮
- Location within Henan
- Coordinates: 32°45′52.09″N 111°42′35.28″E
- Country: China
- Province: Henan
- Prefecture: Nanyang
- County: Xichuan County

Area
  - Total: 362.39 km^{2} (139.92 sq mi)

Population (2008)
  - Total: 48,000
  - Density: 130/km^{2} (340/sq mi)
- Time zone: UTC+8 (China Standard)
- Area code: 474450

Xianghua (Chinese: 香花; pinyin: xiānghuā; Jyutping: lok^{6}cung^{4}) is a town in Xichuan County, Nanyang City, Henan province, Central China. Xianghua is famous for hot peppers, there is a big hot pepper market in the town and it used to be the biggest hot pepper market in China.

== Geography ==
Xianghua town is situated at the Southeastern part of Xichuan. The Danjiangkou Reservoir is located in the west of Xianghua town.
