= Chi River (Hanshui) =

River in China

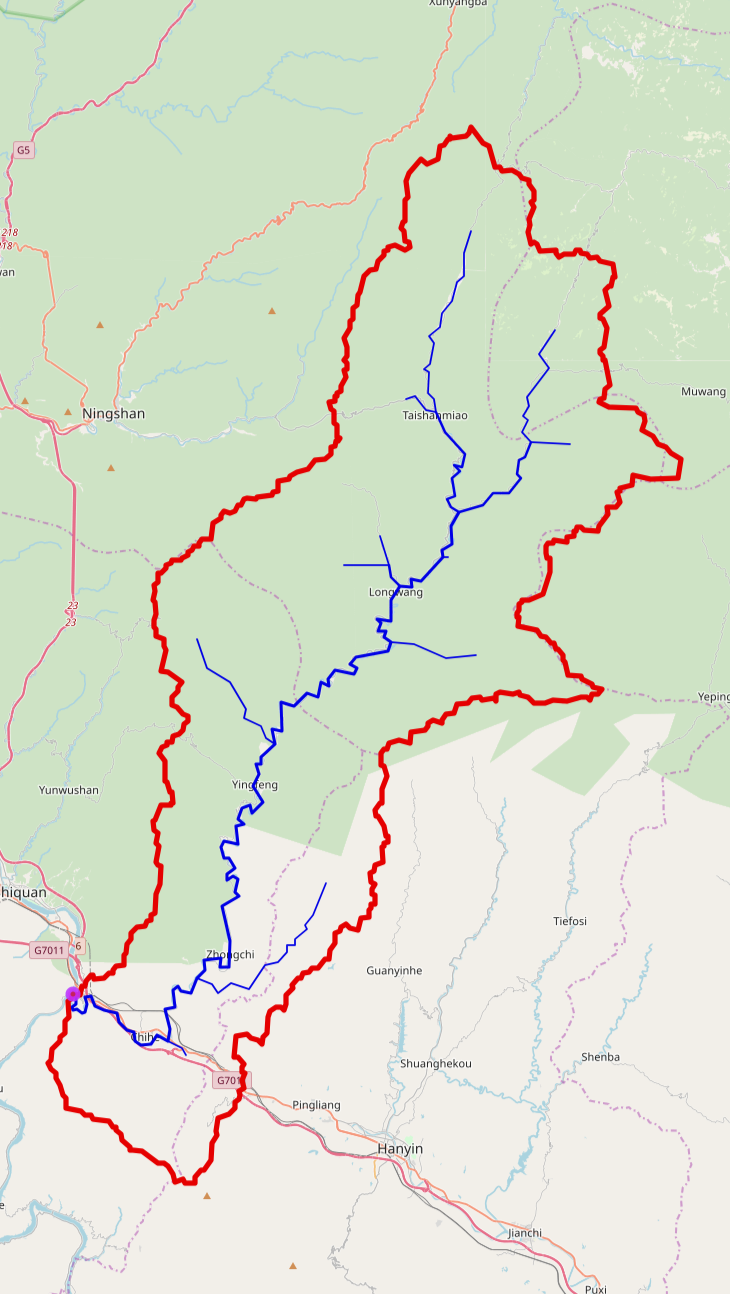
Chi river basin

The Chi River (Chinese: 池河; pinyin: Chí Hé) is a Chinese river that is a tributary to the Hanshui, or Han River, which ultimately flows into the Yangtze. Its total length is 114 kilometres (71 mi) and drains an area of 1,033 square kilometres (399 sq mi). The difference in elevation between its source and mouth is 1,914 metres (6,280 ft).
