= Bozhong Mountain =

Mountain in China

- Chinese: 嶓冢山
- Literal meaning: Elder Bo
Transcriptions
Standard Mandarin
- Hanyu Pinyin: Bōzhǒngshān
- Wade–Giles: Po-chung Shan

Hanwang Mountain
- Simplified Chinese: 汉王山
- Literal meaning: King Han Mountain
Transcriptions
Standard Mandarin
- Hanyu Pinyin: Hanwangshan
- Wade–Giles: Han-wang Shan

Former names

Fuyu Mountain
- Traditional Chinese: 鮒愚山
- Simplified Chinese: 鲋愚山
- Literal meaning: Carp Foolishness Mountain
Transcriptions
Standard Mandarin
- Hanyu Pinyin: Fùyúshān
- Wade–Giles: Fu-yü Shan

Bozhong Mountain, also known by its Chinese name Bozhong Shan, (Note: Former romanizations include Po-khung and Po-mung.) is a mountain mentioned in the Book of Documents. It is said to be the source of the headwaters of the Han River, the namesake of the Han Dynasty and the Han Chinese. The mountain has been identified as a mountain in southern Shaanxi province's Ningqiang County or as another mountain on the border between Gansu province's Tianshui and Li County in the People's Republic of China. Both mountains are referred to as Bozhong Mountain.
