= South–North Water Transfer Project =

Interlinking of major Chinese rivers

- Project logo
- Traditional Chinese: 南水北調工程
- Simplified Chinese: 南水北调工程
- Literal meaning: Southern Water Northern Diversion Project
Transcriptions
Standard Mandarin
- Hanyu Pinyin: Nánshuǐ Běidiào Gōngchéng
- Wade–Giles: Nan-shui P'ei-tiao Kung-ch'eng

The South–North Water Transfer Project, also translated as the South-to-North Water Diversion Project, is a multi-decade infrastructure mega-project in China that aims to channel 44.8 cubic kilometers (44.8 billion cubic meters) of fresh water each year from the Yangtze River in southern China to the more arid and industrialized north through three canal systems:

- The Eastern Route through the course of the Grand Canal;
- The Central Route from the upper reaches of the Han River (a tributary of the Yangtze) via the Grand Aqueduct to Beijing and Tianjin;
- The Western Route, which goes from three tributaries of the Yangtze near Bayankala Mountain to the provinces of Qinghai, Gansu, Shaanxi, Shanxi, Inner Mongolia, and Ningxia.

Construction began in 2003, and the first phases of the Eastern and Central routes became operational in late 2014. The project is the largest water transfer scheme in the world, with an estimated investment exceeding 500 billion yuan (over $70 billion) to date. The South–North Water Transfer Project is intended to alleviate chronic water shortages in northern China, support economic development, and curb over-extraction of groundwater. However, it faces significant engineering, environmental, and social challenges.

== History ==
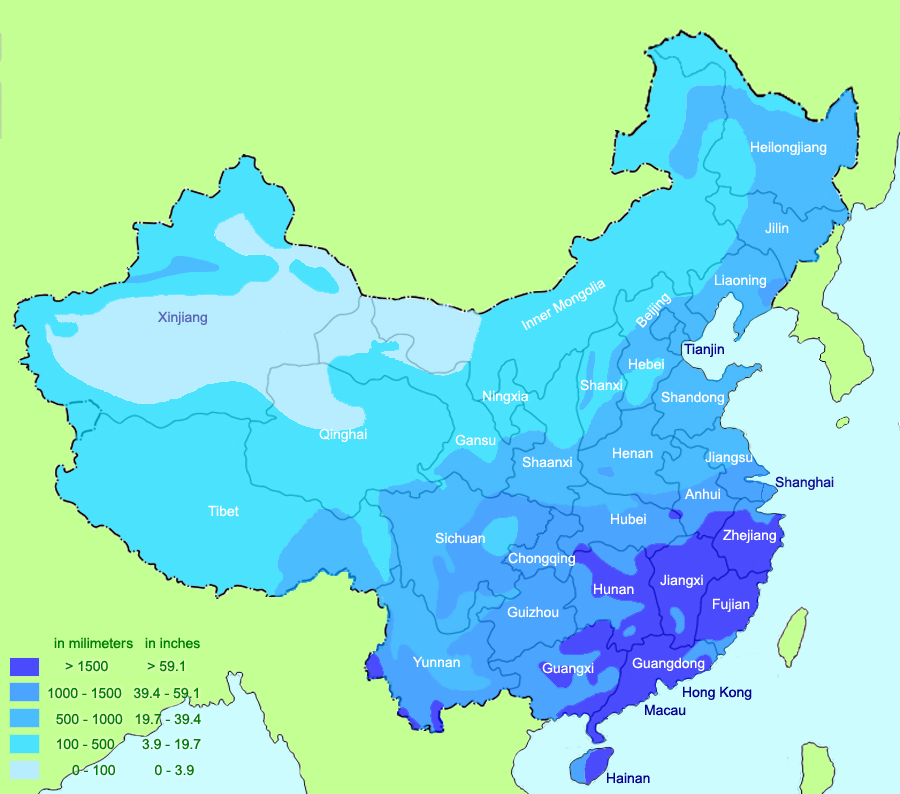
Average annual precipitation in China varies by region.

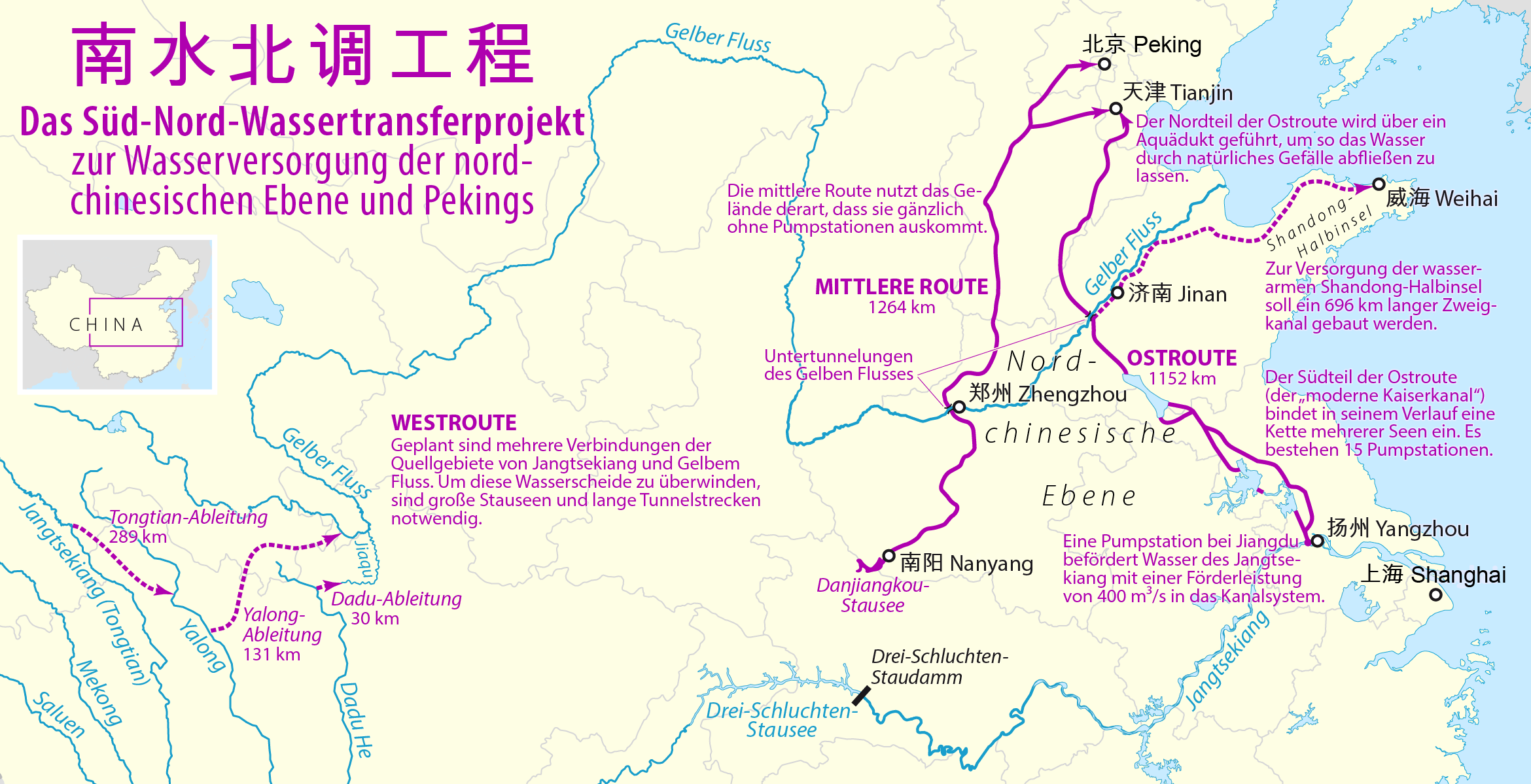
German-language map showing the three routes of the South–North Water Transfer Project

The initial basis for this project was the lack of water in the Chinese north, which has a lot of agricultural land. Mao Zedong discussed the idea for a mass engineering project as an answer to China's water problems as early as 1952. He reportedly said, "there's plenty of water in the south, not much water in the north. If at all possible, borrowing some water would be good". Rapid industrial and agricultural growth since 1978 has resulted in a large increase of water usage in the north, raising water demand in comparison to supply.

Engineer Wang Mengshu initially proposed transferring water from the Songhua River in Jilin, around 900 km from Beijing. Before the construction, it was predicted that the development of the Bohai Economic Rim was significantly constrained by lack of water resources. The decision to start the project was also based on the strategic need to safeguard Beijing's water supply, which could theoretically also be met at similar cost through desalinization. In addition, water has been strategically diverted to Beijing from the surrounding regions in Hebei, which themselves lack water resources.

The project's real concept began in 2002, with China's Ministry of Water Resources, which developed Blueprints and established the Office of the Construction Committee for the South North Water Transfer Project, to oversee building. Construction of the project began in 2003. The East and Middle routes took nine and ten years to build, respectively. The East route began operating in 2013, and the West route saw waterflow by 2014.

In 2024, it was reported that 76.7 km³ of water had been transported in the ten years since operation began. Environmental impacts of the project have been monitored since its initiation, and it was found in 2020 that it greatly increased the water quality as well as the amount of groundwater in the north.

== East route ==
Map of the eastern route

The Eastern Route Project (ERP), or Jiangdu Hydro Project, consists of an upgrade to the Grand Canal and will be used to divert a fraction of the total flow of the Yangtze River to northern China. According to local hydrologists, the entire flow of the Yangtze at the point of its discharge into the East China Sea is, on average, 956 km^{3} per year; the annual flow does not fall below approximately 600 km^{3} per year, even in the driest years. As the project progresses, the amount of water to be diverted to the north will increase from 8.9 km^{3}/year to 10.6 km^{3}/year to 14.8 km^{3}/year.

Water from the Yangtze River will be drawn into the canal in Jiangdu, where a giant 400 m^{3}/s (12.6 km^{3}/year if operated continuously) pumping station was built in the 1980s. The water will then be pumped by stations along the Grand Canal and through a tunnel under the Yellow River and down an aqueduct to reservoirs near Tianjin. Construction on the Eastern route officially began on 27 December 2002, and water was expected to reach Tianjin by 2013. However, in addition to construction delays, water pollution has affected the viability of the route. Initially, the route was expected to provide water for the provinces of Shandong, Jiangsu, and Hebei, with trial operations to begin in mid-2013. Water started arriving in Shandong in 2014, and it is expected one cubic kilometer of water will have been transferred in 2018.

As of October 2017, water had reached Tianjin. Tianjin is expected to receive 1 km^{3}/year. The Eastern route is not expected to supply Beijing, which is to be supplied by the central route.

The completed line will be slightly over 1,152 km (716 miles) long, equipped with 23 pumping stations with a power capacity of 454 megawatts.

An important element of the Eastern Route will be a tunnel crossing under the Yellow River, on the border of Dongping and Dong'e counties of Shandong Province. The crossing will consist of two 9.3 m diameter horizontal tunnels, positioned 70 m under the bed of the Yellow River.

Due to the topography of the Yangtze Plain and the North China Plain, pumping stations will be needed to raise water from the Yangtze to the Yellow River crossing; farther north, the water will be flowing downhill in an aqueduct.

== Central route ==
Map of the central route

The central route, known colloquially as the Grand Aqueduct, runs from Danjiangkou Reservoir on the Han River, a tributary of the Yangtze, to Beijing. This project involved raising the height of the Danjiangkou Dam by increasing the dam's crest elevation from 162 m to 176.6 m above sea level. This addition to the dam's height allows the water level in the reservoir to rise from 157 m to 170 m above sea level and thus permits the flow into the water diversion canal to begin downhill, pulled by gravity into the lower elevation of the canals.

The central route crosses the North China Plain. The canal was constructed to create a continuous downhill flow all the way from the Danjiangkou Reservoir to Beijing without the need for pumping stations. The greatest engineering challenge of the route was building two tunnels under the Yellow River to carry the canal's flow. Construction on the central route began in 2004. In 2008, the 307 km-long northern stretch of the central route was completed at a cost of $2 billion. Water in that stretch of the canal does not come from the Han River but from reservoirs in Hebei Province, south of Beijing. Farmers and industries in Hebei had to cut back on water consumption to allow for water to be transferred to Beijing.

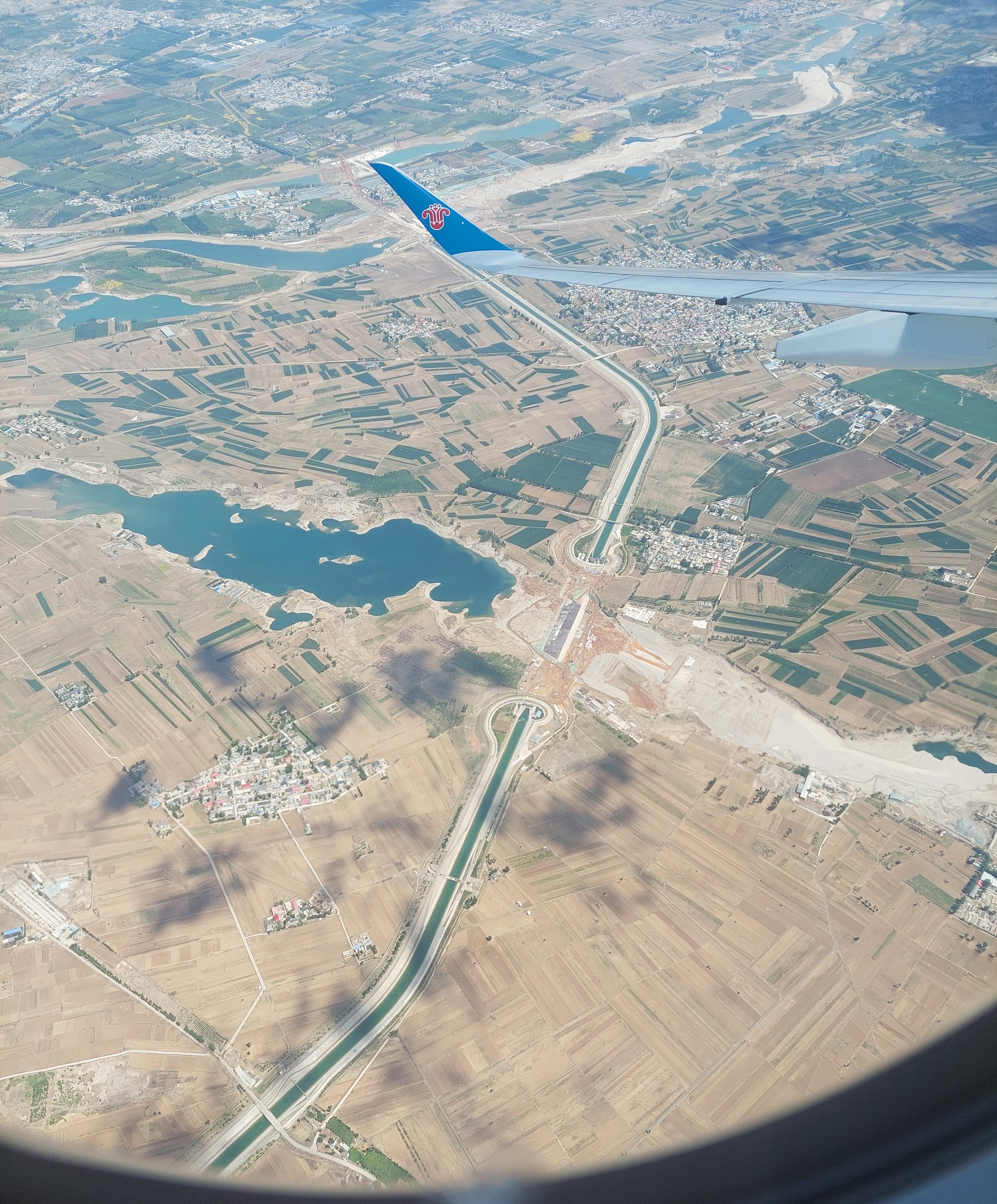
In Zhuozhou, close to entering Beijing

On mapping services, one can see the canal's intake at the Danjiangkou Reservoir (32°40′26″N 111°42′32″E); its crossing of the Baihe River north of Nanyang, Henan (33°6′41″N 112°37′30″E); the Shahe River in Lushan County (33°42′49″N 112°56′40″E); the Ying River in Yuzhou (34°11′05″N 113°26′18″E); and the Yellow River northeast of Zhengzhou (34°52′55″N 113°13′14″E); as well as its entrance into the southwestern suburbs of Beijing at the Juma River in Zhuozhou, Hebei (39°30′26″N 115°47′30″E).

The whole project was expected to be completed around 2010. Final completion was on 12 December 2014, to allow for more environmental protection along the route. One problem was the impact of the project on the Han River below the Danjiangkou Dam, from which approximately one-third of the route's total water is diverted. To mitigate this, another canal is being built to divert water from the Three Gorges Reservoir to the Danjiangkou Reservoir. Construction of this project, named the Yinjiangbuhan tunnel, began in July 2022. It is set to take an estimated ten years to complete.

Another major challenge was the resettlement of around 330,000 people who lived near Danjiangkou Reservoir at its former lower elevation and along the route of the project. On 18 October 2009, Chinese officials began to relocate residents from the areas of Hubei and Henan provinces that would be affected by the project. The completed route of the Grand Aqueduct is about 1,264 km long and initially provided 9.5 km^{3} of water annually. By 2030, the project is slated to increase this transfer to 12–13 km^{3} per year. Although the transfer will be lower in dry years, it is projected that it will be able to provide a flow of at least 6.2 km^{3}/year at all times with 95% confidence.

Industries are prohibited from locating on the reservoir's watershed to keep its water drinkable.

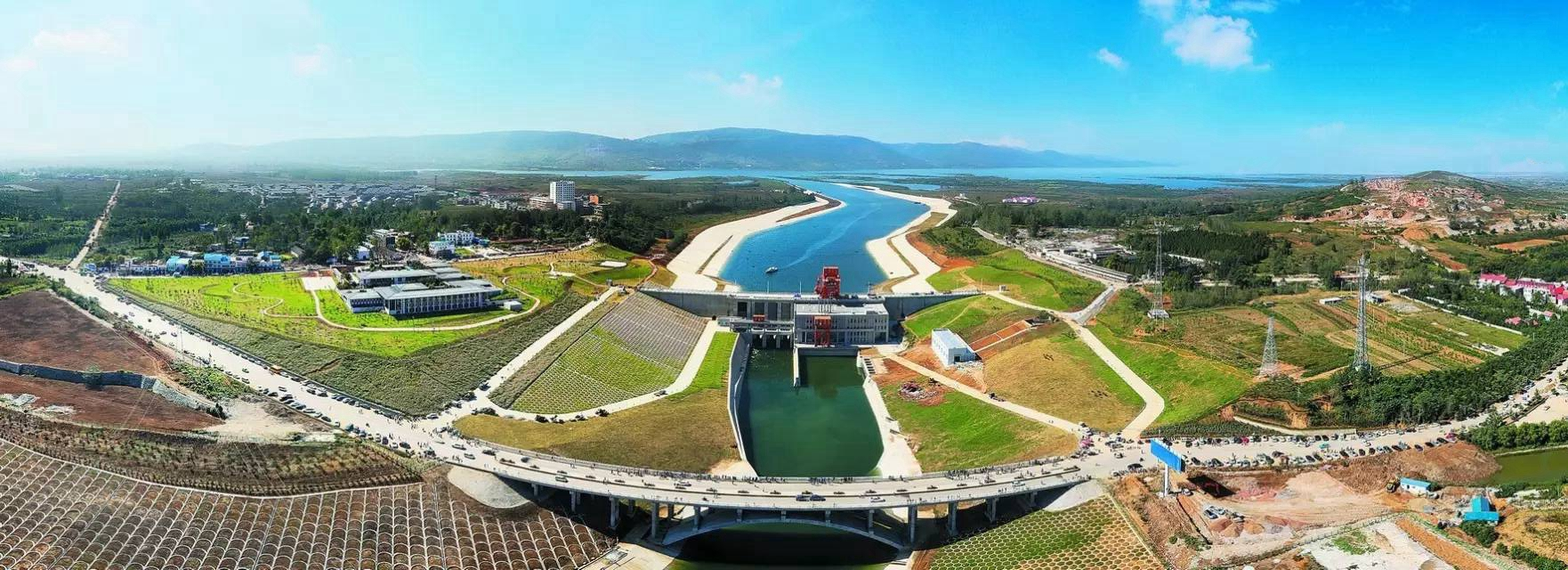
South–North Water Transfer Project Central route starting point in Xichuan County, Nanyang, Henan

== West route ==
There are long-standing plans to divert about 200 cubic kilometers of water per year from the upstream sections of six rivers in southwestern China, including the Mekong (Lancang River), the Yarlung Zangbo (called Brahmaputra further downstream), and the Salween (Nu River), to the Yangtze River, the Yellow River, and ultimately to the dry areas of northern China through a system of reservoirs, tunnels, and natural rivers.

== Financing ==
In 2008, construction costs for the eastern and central routes was estimated to be 254.6 billion yuan ($37.44 billion). The government had budgeted only 53.87 billion yuan ($7.9 billion), less than a quarter of the total cost, at that time. This included 26 billion from the central government and special accounts, 8 billion from local governments, and almost 20 billion in loans. As of 2008, around 30 billion yuan had been spent on the construction of the eastern (5.66 billion yuan) and central routes (24.82 billion yuan). Costs of the projects have increased significantly.

By 2014, more than 208.2 billion RMB (34 billion USD) had been spent, with construction on the western route not yet started. This was a significant amount, costing 3% of all government investment while it was being built. By 2024, 500 billion RMB had been spent on the project.

== Impacts and criticism ==
Notwithstanding these developments, the SNWTP has drawn much criticism for its negative environmental effects. The project required resettling at least 330,000 people in central China. Critics have warned the water diversion will cause environmental damage, and some villagers said officials had forced them to sign agreements to relocate.

In 2013, Radio Free Asia reported that fish farmers on Dongping Lake, on the project's eastern route, in Shandong, claimed that the polluted Yangtze River water entering the lake was killing their fish. Subsequent scientific research showed that the water diversion improved the water environment of Dongping Lake.

Although the project recharged northern rivers, lakes, and aquifers, reversing groundwater depletion, concerns remain over reduced downstream flows in source regions, which have been partially addressed by supplementary projects.

Additionally, scientists have expressed concern that the project will increase water losses from open-canal evaporation, implying lower water transfer efficiency and possibly reducing both ecological and financial advantages. The exact amount of evaporation loss is not known, but it may be improved in the future as more water is transferred and the flow rate increases. In terms of climate-change scenarios that can aggravate water shortage, these evaporation losses also raise questions over the project's long-term sustainability and environmental feasibility.

Engineer Wang Mengshu has noted that a tunnel structure would have reduced the project's cost, as the ground-level canal required more excavation and land acquisition as well as the construction of 1,300 bridges.

== See also ==
- Water resources of China
- Meng Xuenong, the project's deputy director (2003–2007)
- Irtysh–Karamay–Ürümqi Canal, in Xinjiang province
- Central Yunnan Water Diversion Project, similar project under construction in southern China
