= Han River (Hubei and Shaanxi) =

Longest tributary of the Yangtze River, China

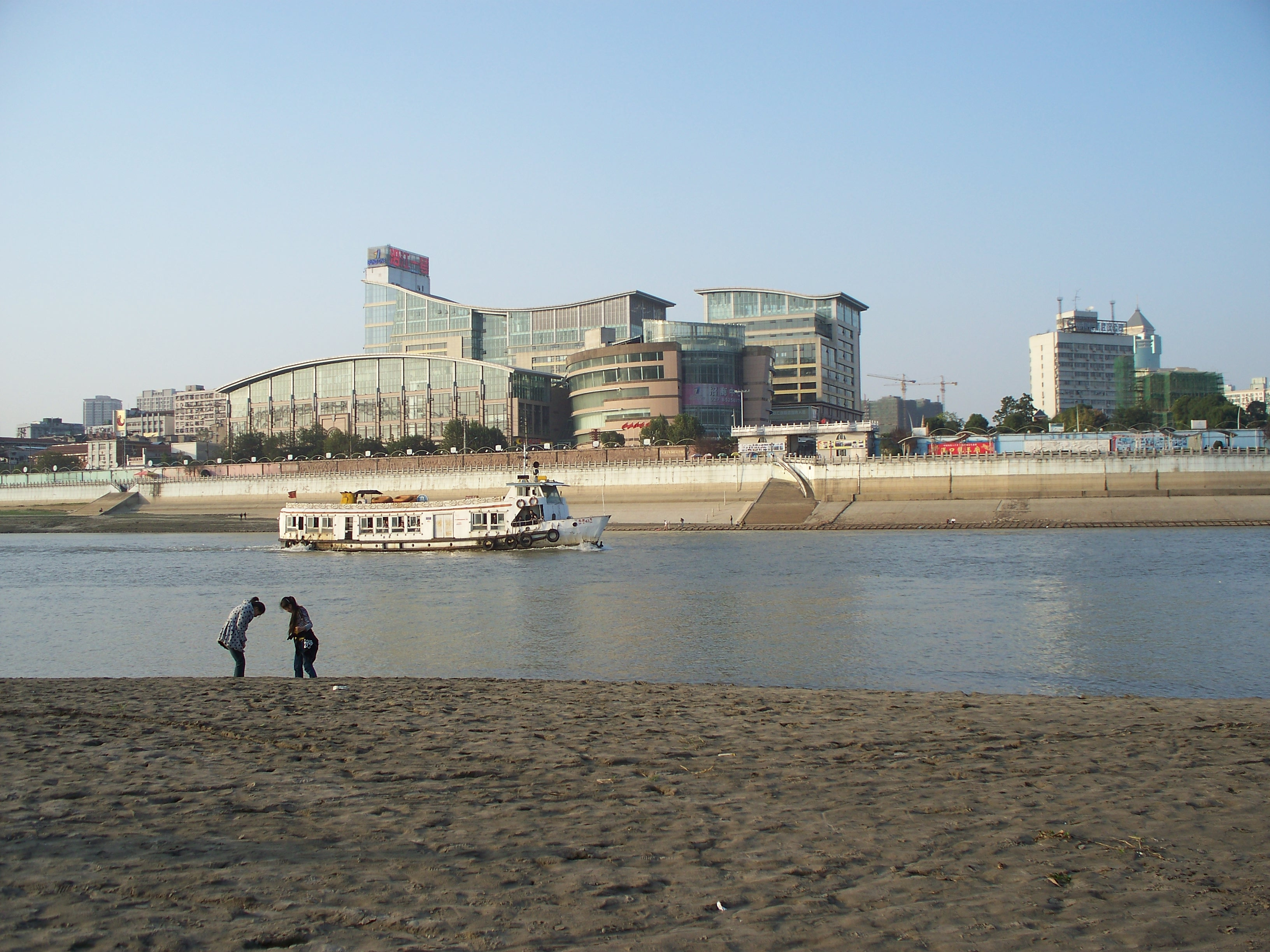
- The Han River in Wuhan

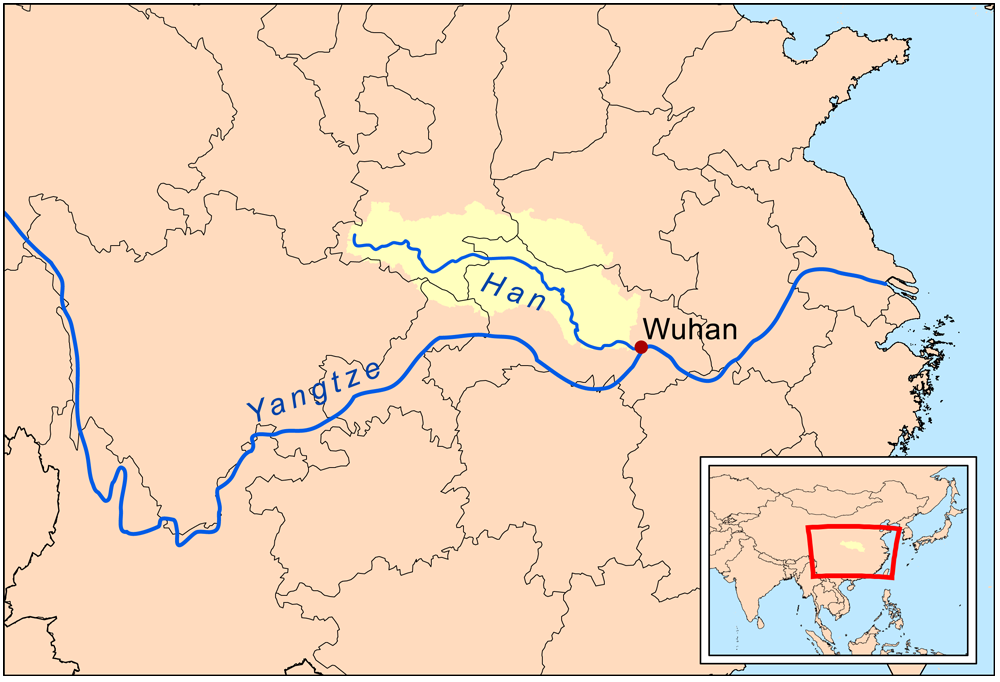
- Watershed of the Han River

Location
- Country: China
- Region: Shaanxi, Hubei
- Cities: Hanzhong, Ankang, Shiyan, Xiangyang, Xiantao, Wuhan

Physical characteristics
- Source: Near Hanzhong
  - location: Qin Mountains, Shaanxi
  - coordinates: 33°08′32″N 106°49′42″E
  - elevation: 580 m (1,900 ft)
- Mouth: Yangtze
  - location: Wuhan, Hubei
  - coordinates: 30°33′52″N 114°17′30″E
  - elevation: 75 m (246 ft)
- Length: 1,532 km (952 mi), northwest–southeast
- Basin size: 174,300 km^{2} (67,300 sq mi)
- Discharge
  - average: 1,632 m^{3}/s (57,600 cu ft/s)
  - maximum: 33,500 m^{3}/s (1,180,000 cu ft/s)

Basin features
- River system: Yangtze basin
- Tributaries
  - left: Xun, Dan, Bai River (China), Fushui River
  - right: Du, Chi, Nan, Muma

Han River
- Traditional Chinese: 漢江
- Simplified Chinese: 汉江
- Hanyu Pinyin: Hànjiāng
Transcriptions
Standard Mandarin
- Hanyu Pinyin: Hànjiāng
- Wade–Giles: Han Chiang

Alternative Chinese name
- Traditional Chinese: 漢水
- Simplified Chinese: 汉水
- Hanyu Pinyin: Hànshuǐ
Transcriptions
Standard Mandarin
- Hanyu Pinyin: Hànshuǐ
- Wade–Giles: Han-shui

The Han River, also known by its Chinese names Hanjiang (汉江; 漢江) and Hanshui, is a major river in Central China. A left tributary of the Yangtze, the longest river in Asia, it has a length of 1,532 km (952 mi) and is the longest tributary of the Yangtze system.

The river is the namesake of the city of Hanzhong (汉中; 漢中; 'middle of the Han') on its upper course, from which it gives its name to the ancient Chinese Han dynasty (汉朝; 漢朝), which marked one of ancient China's first golden ages. Through that, it gives its name to the Han Chinese, the dominant ethnic group in modern China and the most populous ethnic group in the world, and to spoken Chinese (汉语; 漢語; 'Han language') and Chinese characters (汉字; 漢字; 'Han characters').

It is also the namesake of Hankou (汉口; 漢口; 'mouth of the Han') and Hanyang (汉阳; 漢陽; 'north bank of the Han'), two of the three cities (with Wuchang) that merged to form Wuhan (武汉; 武漢) at its mouth, China's seventh-largest city, which it is therefore also the namesake of. Three of the 13 modern districts of Wuhan are named afer it—Hanyang, Jianghan (江汉; 江漢), and Hannan (汉南; 漢南; 'south of the Han'—as is the adjacent city of Hanchuan (汉川; 漢川).

== Geography ==
The headwaters of the Han flow from Mount Bozhong in southwestern Shaanxi. The stream then travels east across the southern part of that province (Shaannan). Its highland valley—known as the Qinba Laolin (Note: Also known in Chinese as "one river enclosed by two mountains" (Liangshan Jia Yichuan).)—divides and is protected by the Qinling or Qin Mountains to its north and the Dabashan or Daba Mountains to its south. The main cities are Hanzhong in the west and Ankang in the east. It then enters Hubei. It crosses most of Hubei from the northwest to the southeast, flowing into the Yangtze at the provincial capital Wuhan, a city of several million inhabitants. The merging rivers divide the city of Wuhan into three sections: Wuchang in the south, Hankou to the northeast of the confluence, and Hanyang to its southwest. The area surrounding the confluence is known as the Jianghan Plain.

Apart from a few major basins, such as the area around Hanzhong, the highlands of the Han were covered in primeval forests as late as the 19th century. The Nanshan Forest covered the northern slopes; the Bashan Forest, the southern.

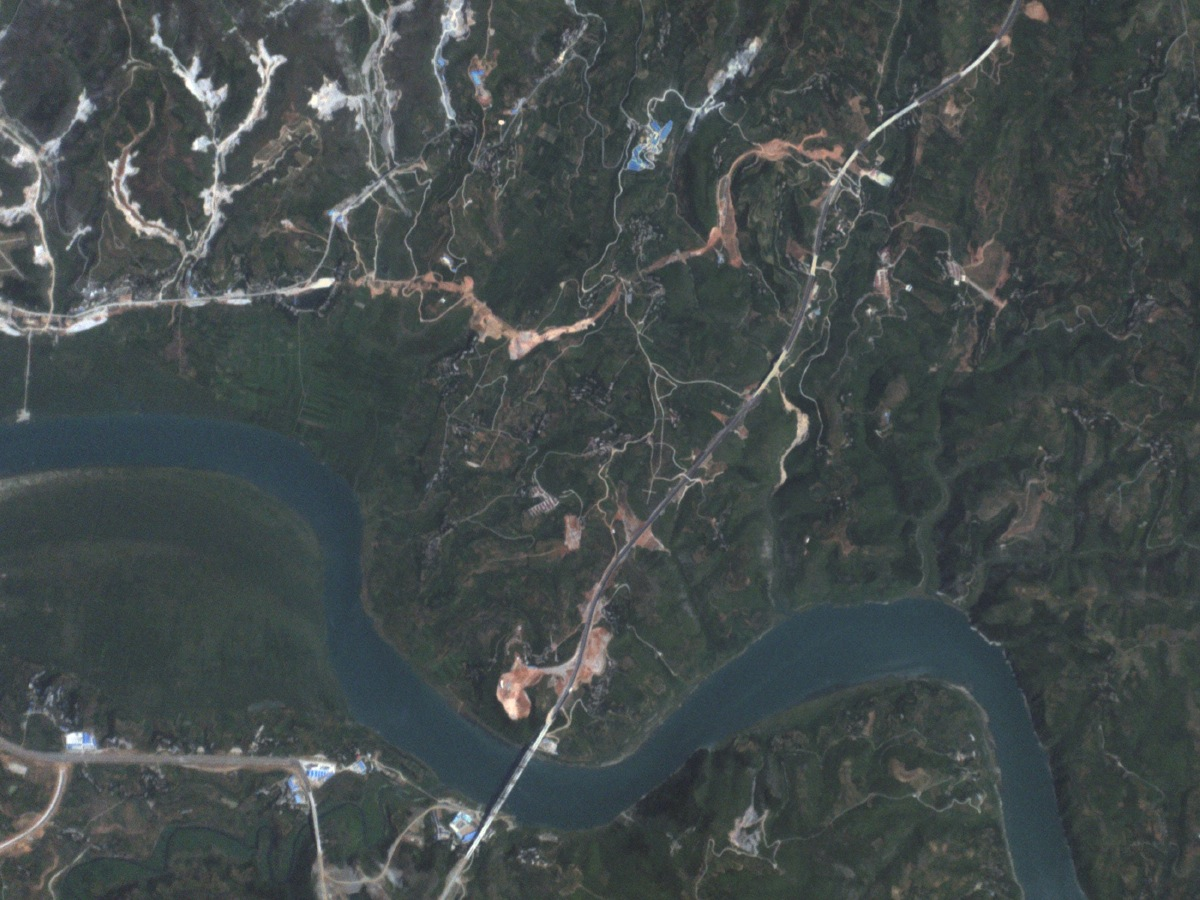
Satellite view of the Han River near Yangxipu in Yunyang District, Hubei

== Hydroelectric Projects ==
Danjiangkou Dam was constructed on the Han River in northern Hubei in 1958. It has been heightened since. The Danjiangkou Reservoir created thereby is now used as part of the South–North Water Transfer Project.

== Culture ==
The river was previously considered holy by the inhabitants on its banks. It is also considered part of the dividing line between northern and southern China.

== See also ==
- Xihan River, the "Western Han"
