= Daba Mountains =

Mountain range in China

Coordinates: 32°00′N 109°30′E

- Dabashan
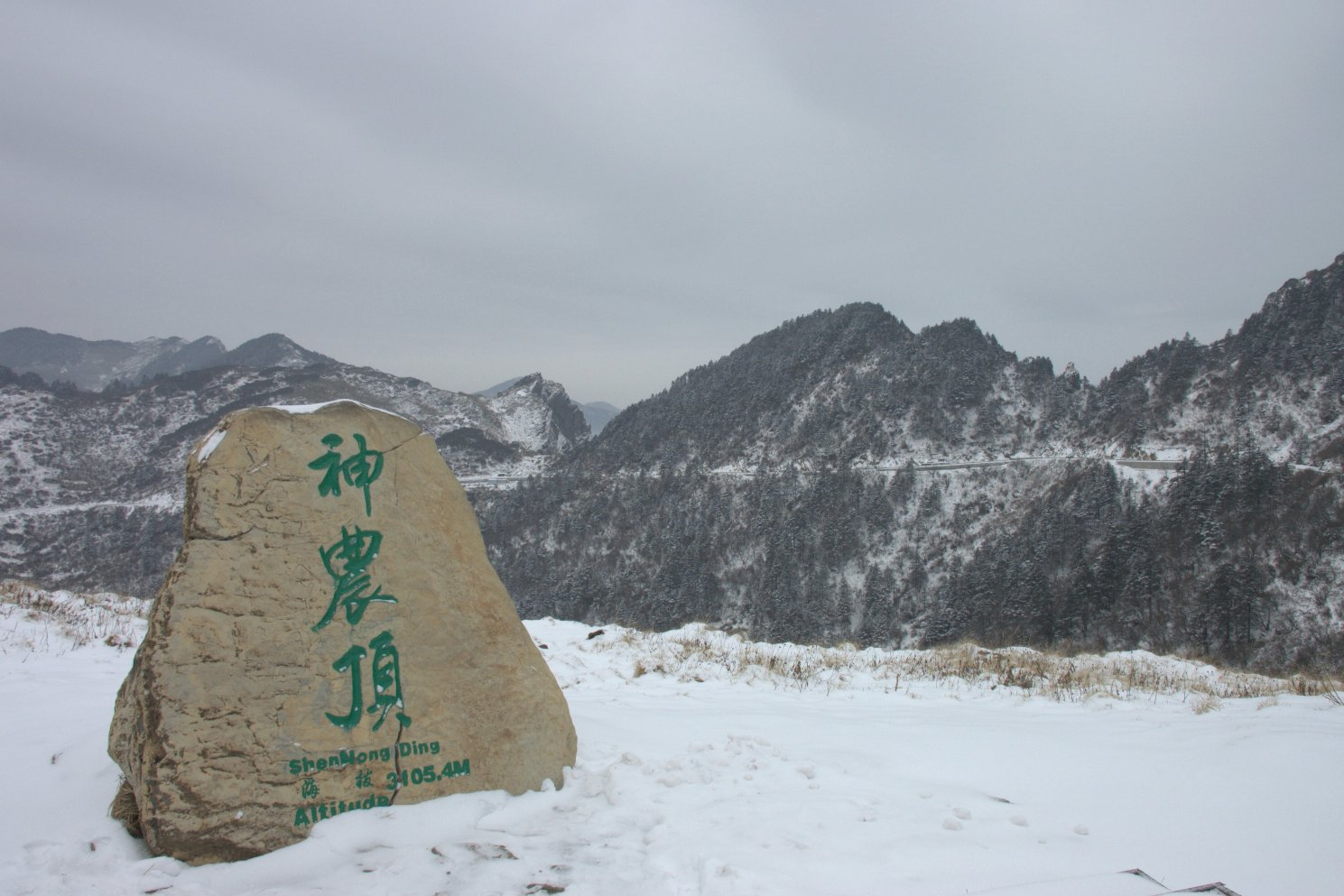
- On top of the Shennong Peak

Highest point
- Elevation: 3,105 m (10,187 ft)
- Prominence: Shennong Ding

Naming
- Native name: 大巴山 (Chinese)

Geography
- Location within China

Daba Mountains
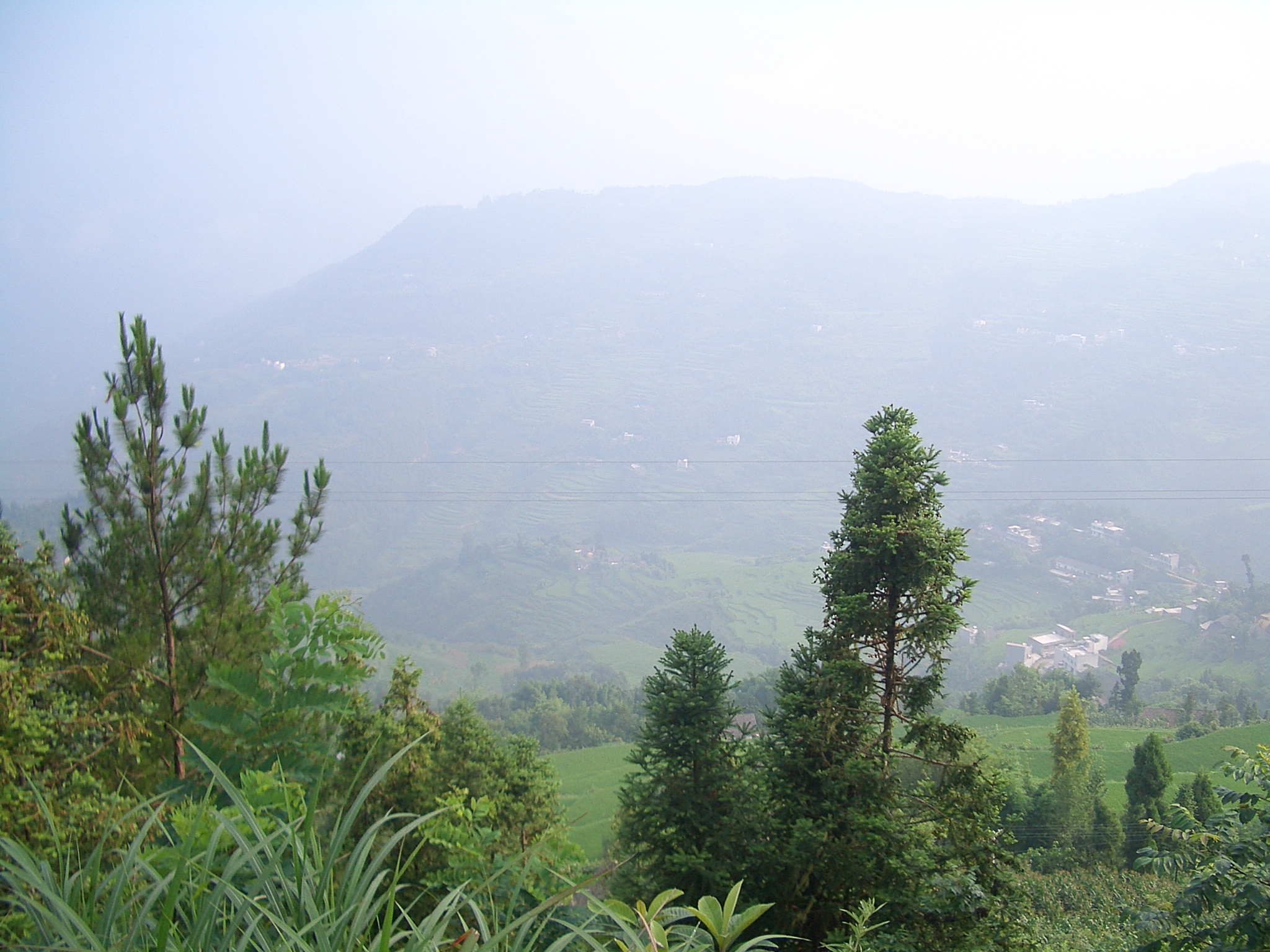
- Morning in Xiqiuwan in Badong County
- Chinese: 大巴山
- Literal meaning: Great Ba Mountain(s)
Transcriptions
Standard Mandarin
- Hanyu Pinyin: Dàbāshān
- Wade–Giles: Ta Pa Shan; Ta-pa-shan

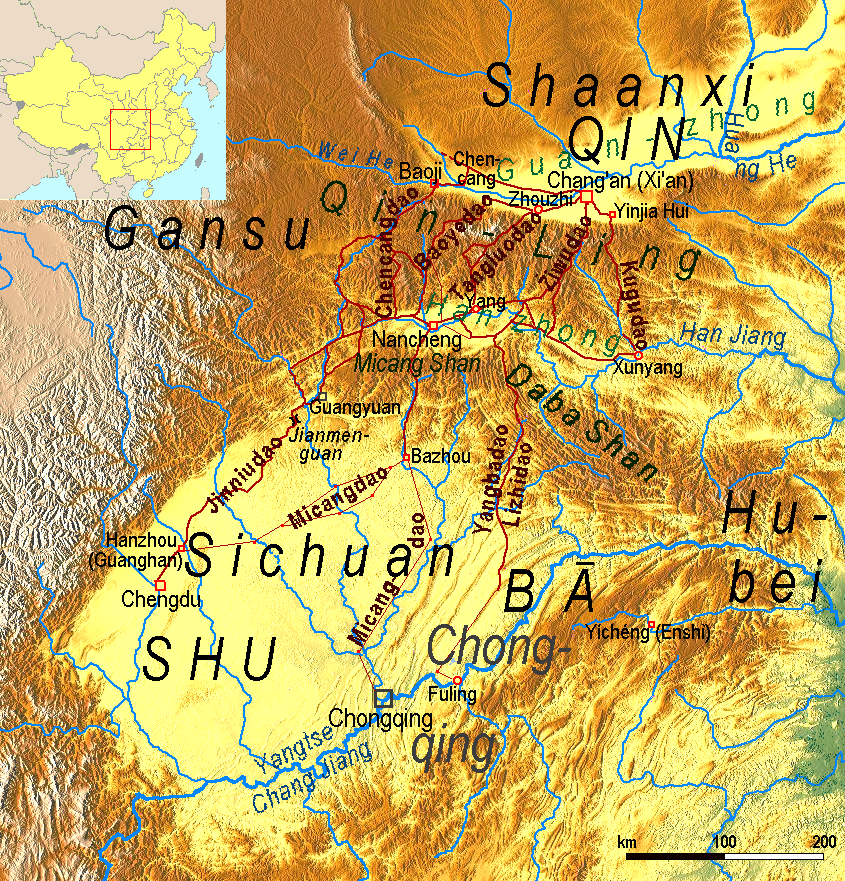
Detailed view of various mountain ranges and passes between Shaanxi and Sichuan

The Daba Mountains, also known by their Chinese name as the Dabashan, (Note: In the 19th century, the range was also known as the Kew-lung or Po-mung. The latter name refers to Mount Bozhong, the source of the Han River. In Chinglish sources, the range is also sometimes referenced as "Mount Daba" or "Daba Mountain", owing to confusion arising from the general lack of plural forms in Chinese.) are a mountain range in Central China between the watersheds of the Yellow and Yangtze Rivers. Part of the larger Qinling mountain range, it cuts through four provinces: Sichuan, Chongqing, Shaanxi, and Hubei. It spans about 1,000 kilometers (620 mi).

== Geography ==
The Daba Mountains run in the general west-northwest to east-southeast direction, along the border between, on the one side (southwest and south) Sichuan and Chongqing, and on the other side (northeast and north) Shaanxi and Hubei. The mountains of Shennongjia are often considered the easternmost section of the Daba Range.

The southern slope of the Daba Mountains drains into the Sichuan Basin or directly into the Yangtze via short streams that flow into the river in the Three Gorges area, such as the Shen Nong Stream. The northern side drains into the Han River, a major tributary of the Yangtze, which, however, does not join the Yangtze until some hundreds kilometers to the east (in Wuhan).

The Daba Mountains' highest points are in the Shennongjia massif in Shennongjia Forest District. The three tallest peaks, located west of Muyu town, are Shennong Deng ("Shennong Peak", 3,105 meters (10,187 ft) elevation), Da Shennongjia ("Great Shennongjia", 3,052 meters (10,013 ft)), and Xiao Shennongjia ("Lesser Shennongjia", 3,005 meters (9,859 ft), on the district's border with Badong County). Laojun Shan, 2,936 meters (9,633 ft) tall, is located northeast of Muyu.

In the southeast, the Daba Mountains are joined to the Wu Mountains, which block the Yangtze's flow out of the Sichuan Basin. In the east, the small Jingshan Range (in the southern part of the Xiangyang Prefecture) can be viewed as the extreme extension of the Daba Mountains. In the northeast, the Wudang Mountains are nearby; some authors even consider them a "branch" of the Daba Mountains.

In the rural counties of southern Hanzhong, in Shaanxi Province, there is a large area of karst with some of the largest sinkholes in the world, known as the Shaanxi tiankeng cluster or "Hanzhong tiankeng group". It covers nearly 5019 square kilometers and is located in four counties, Ningqiang County, Nanzheng County, Xixiang County, and Zhenba County, with the largest sinkhole (520 meters in diameter and 320 meters deep), near Sanyuanzhen (三元镇) in Zhenba County.

== Natural environment ==
The natural landscape of the region, the Daba Mountains evergreen forests, is listed by the World Wildlife Fund (WWF) as one of the world's 200 ecoregions that should be a priority for conservation. Dabashan National Nature Reserve is located in the Chongqing part of the Daba Mountains (Chengkou County); Shennongjia Mountain Nature Reserve (704 square kilometers (272 sq mi)), in Hubei (Shennongjia Forestry District).

The Dawn Redwood (Metasequoia glyptostroboides) is a deciduous conifer endemic to the Daba Shan, whose nearest living relatives are the Coast Redwood and Giant Sequoia of California. Redwoods formerly ranged across the northern hemisphere, but were thought to be extinct outside California until stands of Dawn Redwood were discovered in the Daba Shan in the 1940s.

Flora of the Daba Mountains

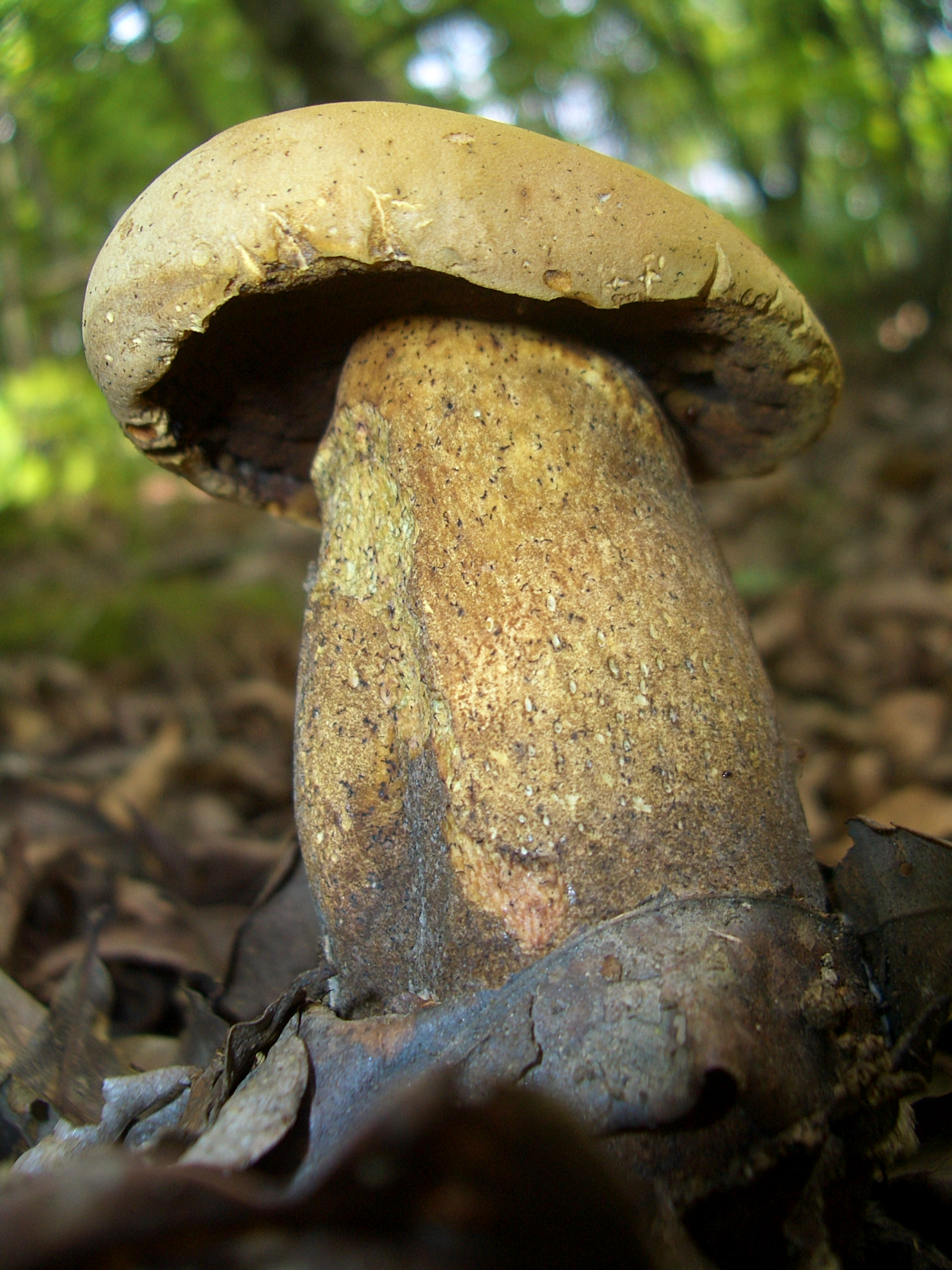
A forest mushroom (near Muyu, Shennongjia)

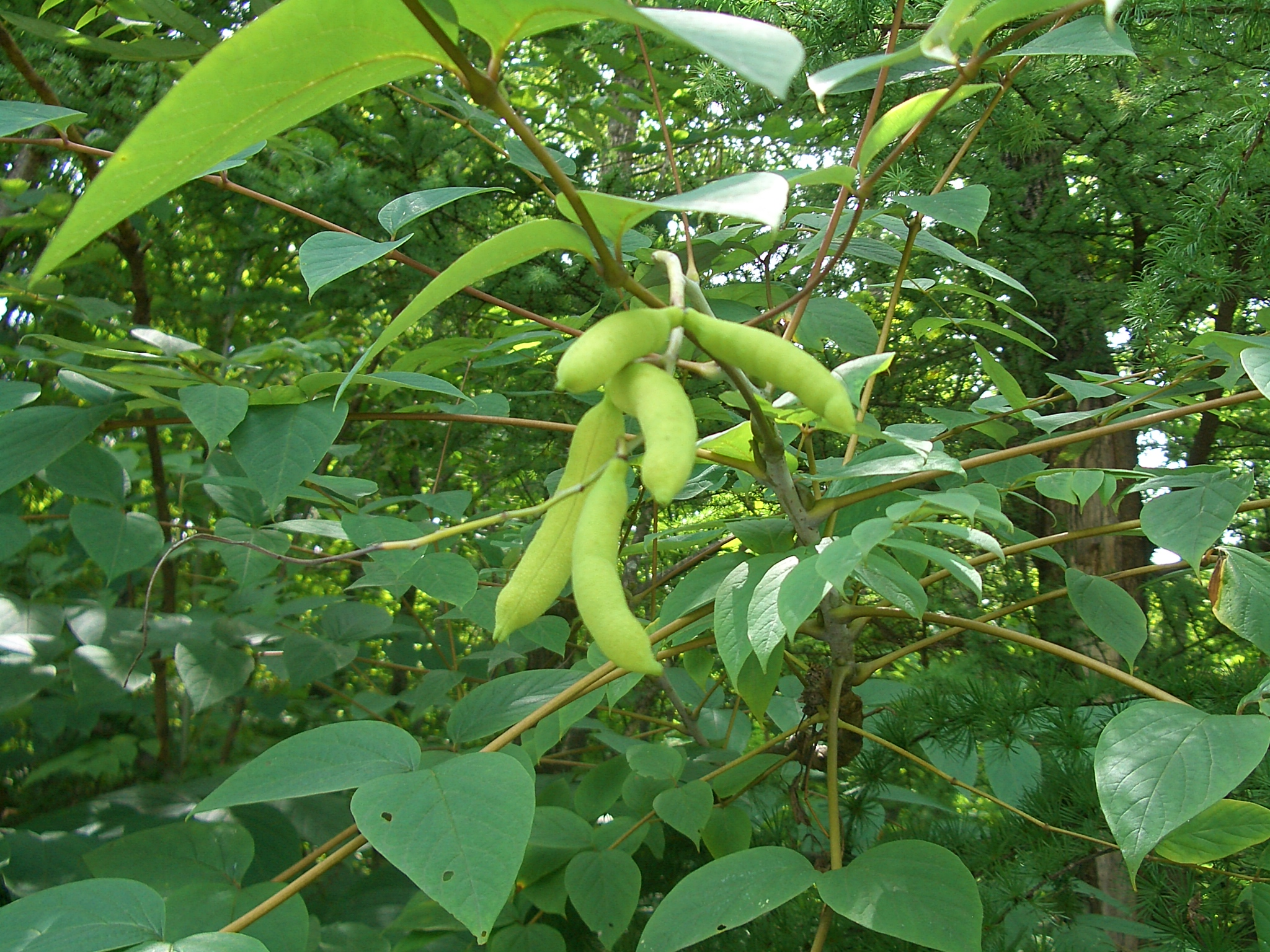
Decaisnea insignis (at about 2,000 meters (6,600 ft) elevation, north of Muyu)

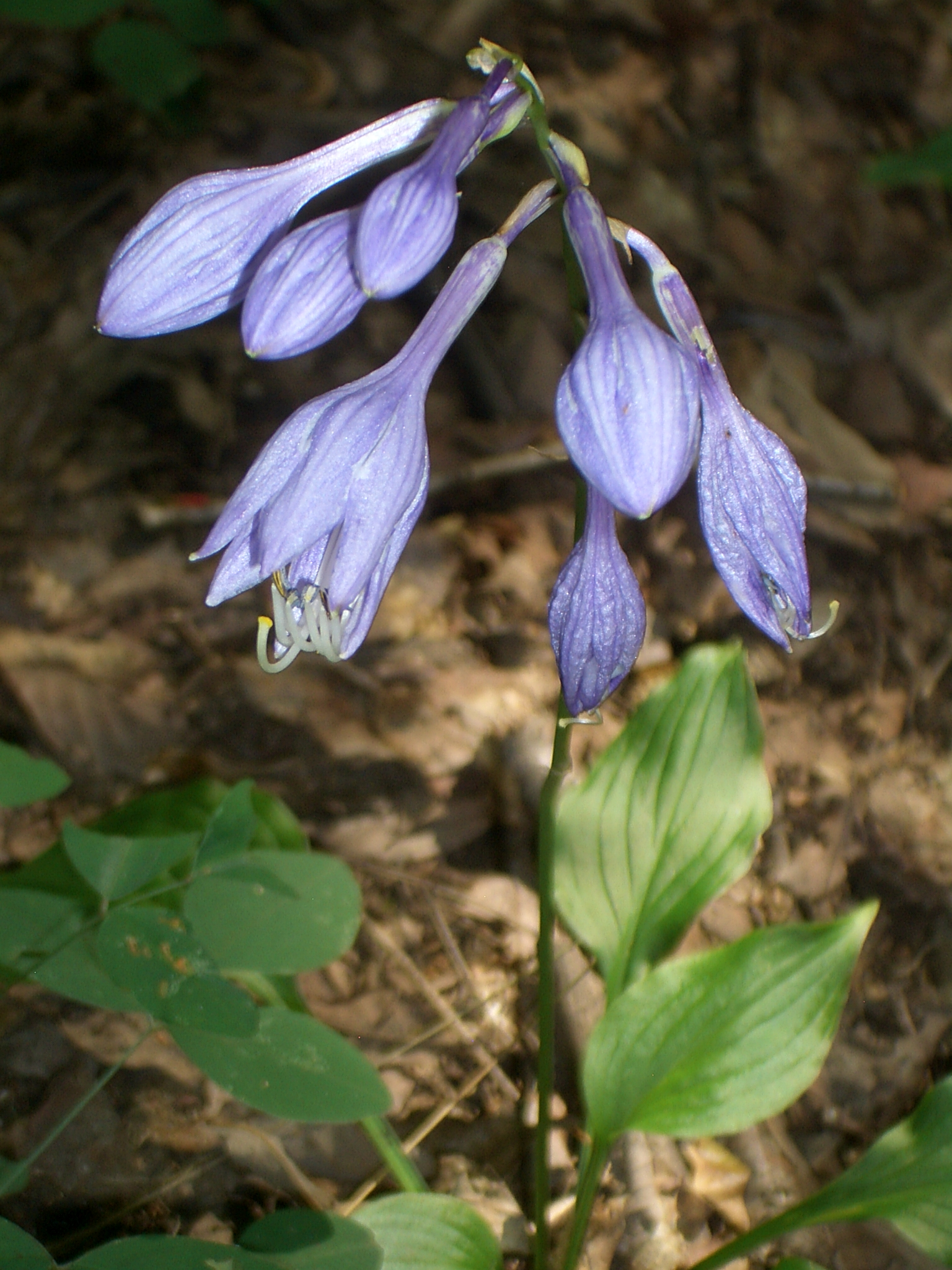
Hosta ventricosa

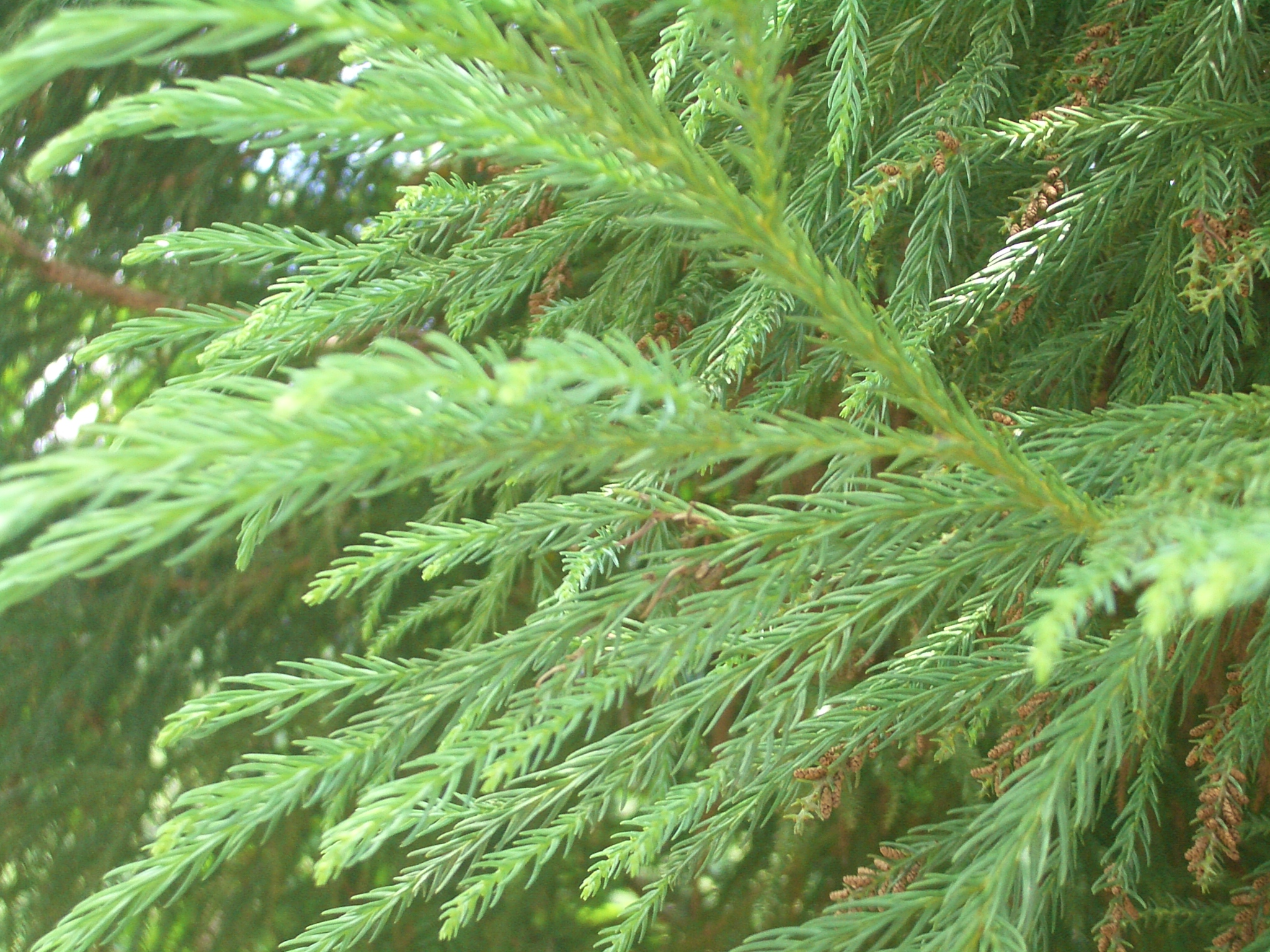
Cryptomeria japonica

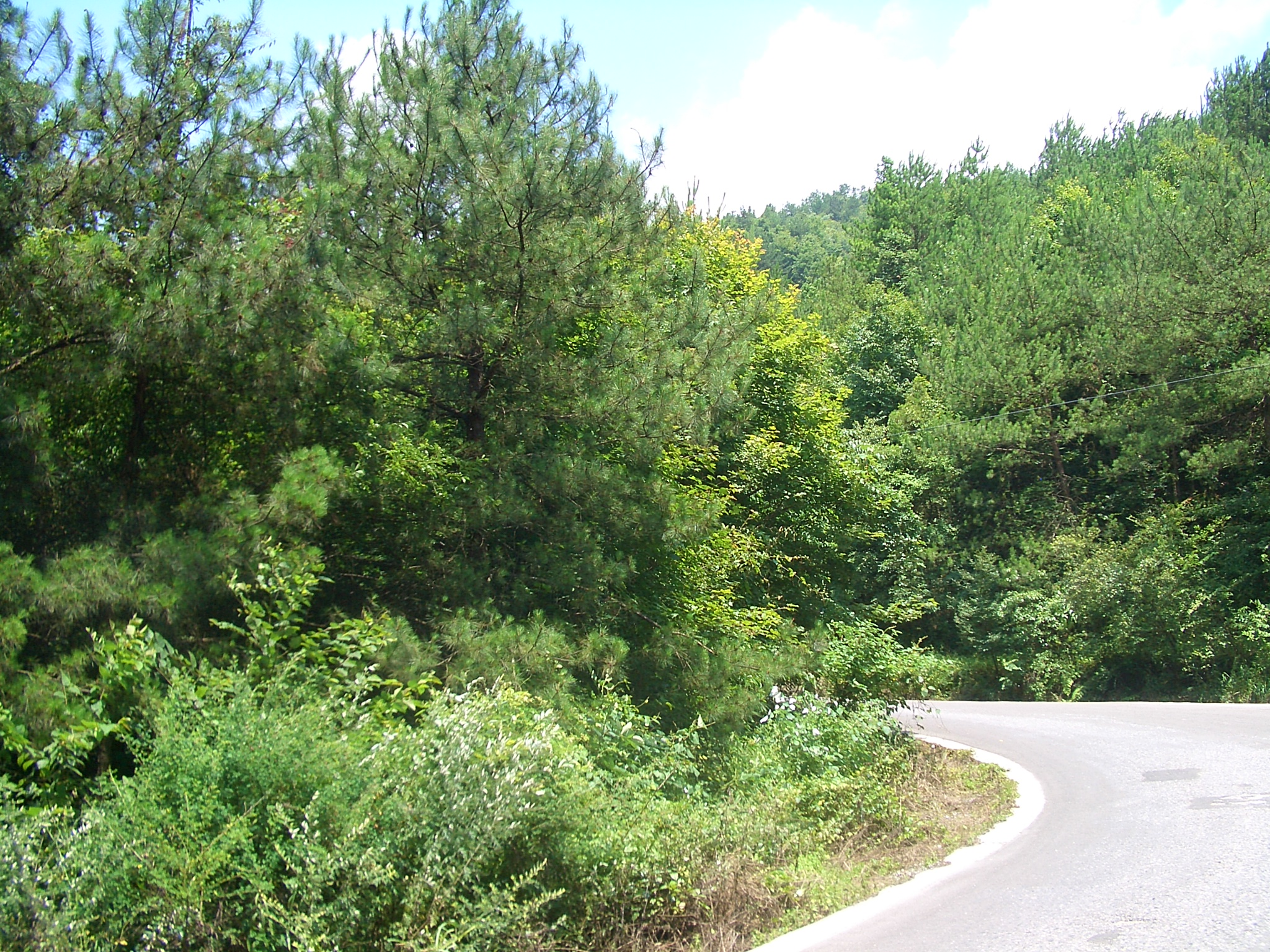
Chinese red pine (Pinus tabuliformis), in Xingshan County

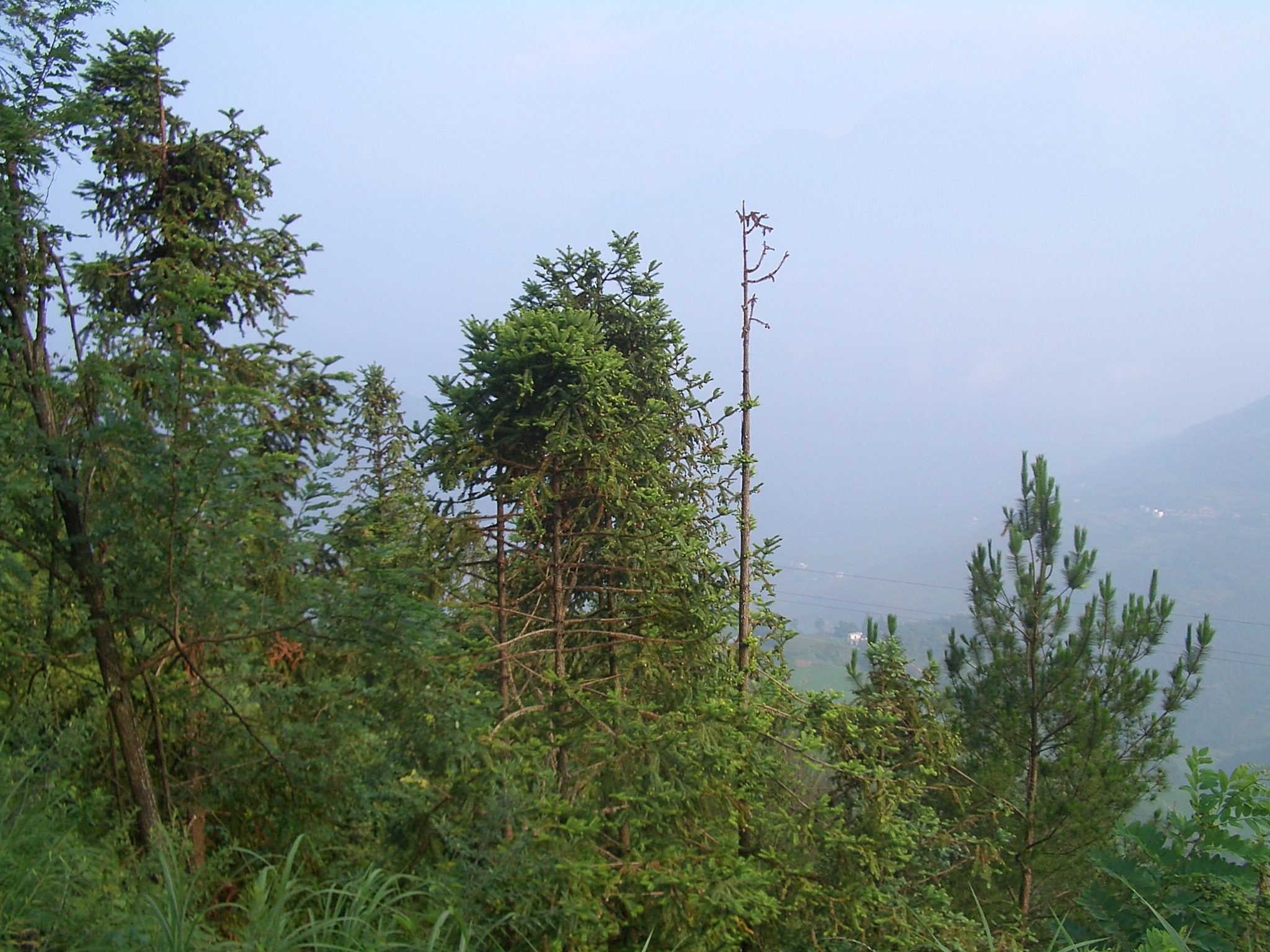
Cunninghamia lanceolata (center), in Badong County

== Land use ==
Presently, terraced agriculture is expanded in the Daba Mountains. A widely planted cash crop is the Eucommia tree, a medicinal plant.
