= Fan Zhen =

Chinese philosopher (450–515)

Fàn Zhěn (范縝, hanyupinyin Fàn Zhěn) (c. 450 – 515) was a Chinese philosopher, politician, and writer. He was an atheist of the Southern Qi Dynasty, remembered today for his treatise Shén Miè Lùn (simplified Chinese 神灭论, traditional Chinese 神滅論, "On the Annihilation of the Soul"), preserved in the Book of Liang.

Fàn was born into a poor family in today's Zhumadian, Henan province. He was a member of a cadet branch of the elite Fàn family, and became a high-ranking official thanks to his erudition. In response to the prevailing Buddhist movement of his time, he wrote Shen Mie Lun in 507, a treatise denying the ideas of reincarnation and body-soul dualism. A courtier tried to persuade Fàn to give up his opinion, in exchange for a higher official title, but Fàn refused. Emperor Wu of Liang, displeased with the subject of Fàn's work, made an imperial decree (敕答臣下神滅論) to criticize the treatise, and ordered 64 of his courtiers to answer Fàn back. 75 pamphlets were produced against Shen Mie Lun. Fàn did not surrender, though, and wrote back to hold fast to his opinion. The debate failed to disprove the dissertation.

== Bibliography ==
- Zhōngguó Dà Bǎikē Quánshū [Encyclopedia of China] (in Chinese) (1st ed.). Beijing, Shanghai. 1993. ISBN 978-7-5000-7958-3.
