= Zhangwan, Shiyan =

Zhangwan 张湾区
- District
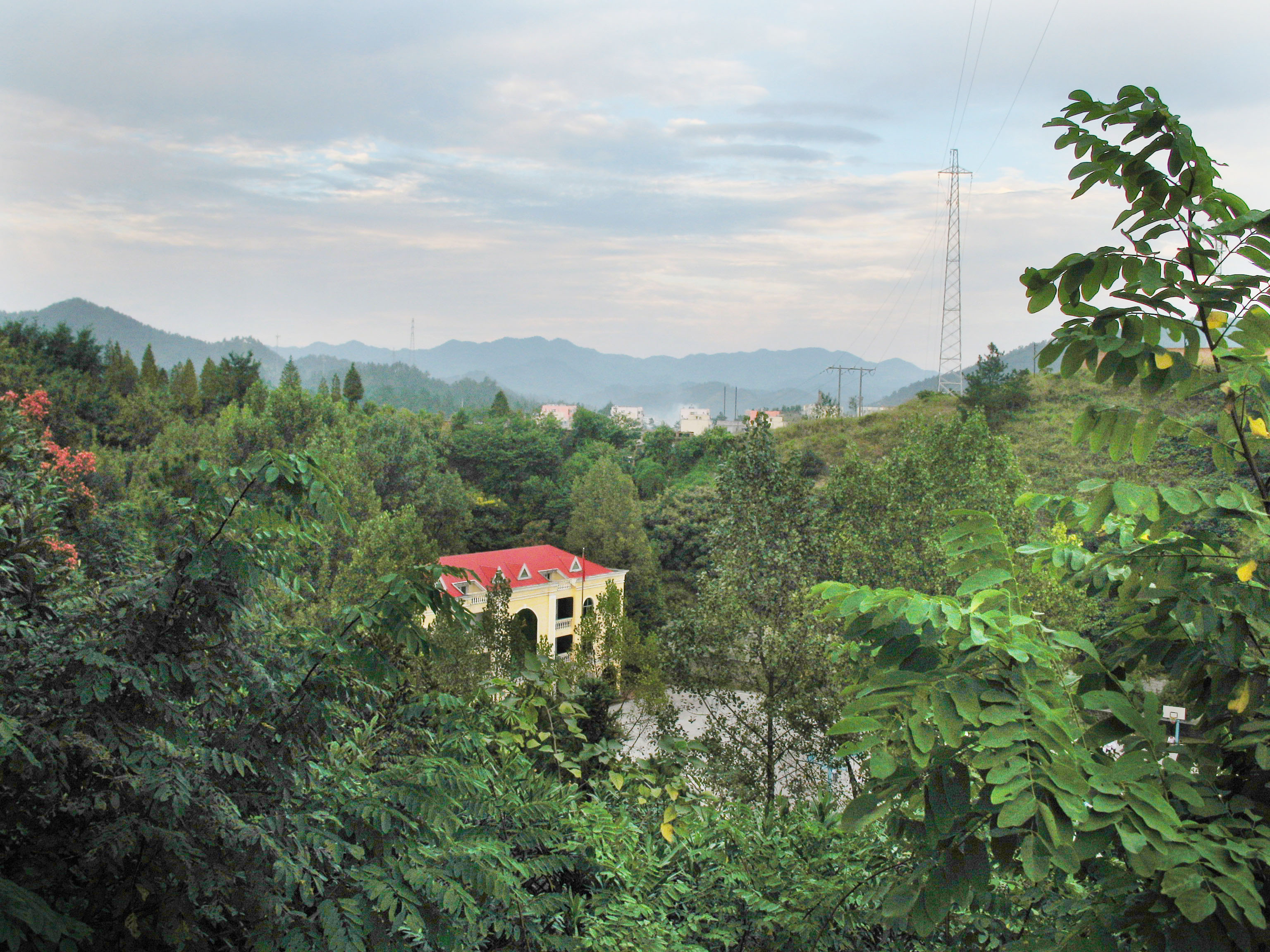
- Sports building of Dongfeng High School

- Location in Hubei
- Coordinates (Zhangwan government): 32°39′07″N 110°46′08″E
- Country: China
- Province: Hubei
- Prefecture-level city: Shiyan
- District seat: Checheng Road Subdistrict

Area
  - Total: 657 km^{2} (254 sq mi)

Population (2020 census)
  - Total: 431,859
  - Density: 657/km^{2} (1,700/sq mi)
- Time zone: UTC+8 (China Standard)
- Postal code: 442000
- Website: www.zhangwan.gov.cn

Zhangwan District (simplified Chinese: 张湾区; traditional Chinese: 張灣區; pinyin: Zhāngwān Qū) is a district of the city of Shiyan, Hubei, China.

== History ==
Human activity in the area can be traced back to approximately 5000 BCE on the banks of the Du River.

The area belonged to the Chu State during its existence. The area later belonged to the Qin dynasty.

The area was incorporated under the Jin dynasty as Weiyang County (微阳县).

During the Sui dynasty and the early Tang dynasty, the area was incorporated as Duyang County (堵阳县). In 627 CE, the county was dissolved and replaced by Yunxiang County (郧乡县). Yunxiang County would itself be dissolved in 1277 under the Southern Song, and replaced by Yun County (郧县). The area would remain as Yun County throughout subsequent dynasties, and through the rule of the Republic of China.

In December 1947, Yun County was taken by Communist forces. In subsequent years, the area would be re-organized multiple times. The prefecture-level city of Shiyan was established in December 1969.

Zhangwan was established as a county-level subdistrict (县级街道) in November, 1980.

In May 1984, Zhangwan was re-organized as a district (区).

On 13 June 2021, a gas explosion occurred in Zhangwan District.

== Geography ==
The district is located near the geographic center of Shiyan, bordering Maojian District to its southeast, and bordering Yunyang District elsewhere.

=== Climate ===
Zhangwan District has a subtropical climate with four distinct seasons, long winters and summers, and short springs and autumns. The average annual sunshine in the district is 1889.3 hours, the annual average temperature is 15.25 °C, and the annual average precipitation is 1000.8 millimetres.

== Administrative divisions ==
Zhangwan District administers 4 subdistricts, 2 towns, 2 townships, and 2 other township-level divisions.

4 subdistricts

- Huaguo Subdistrict (花果街道)
- Hongwei Subdistrict (红卫街道)
- Checheng Road Subdistrict (车城路街道)
- Hanjiang Road Subdistrict (汉江路街道)

2 towns

- Huanglong (黄龙镇)
- Bailin (柏林镇)

2 townships

- Fangtan Township (方滩乡)
- Xigou Township (西沟乡)

2 other township-level divisions are: Xicheng Development Zone (西城开发区) and Shiyan Industrial New Area (十堰工业新区).

== Demographics ==
In the 2010 Chinese census, Zhangwan had a population of 368,471 people. By 2015, the district's population rose to approximately 399,000 people. By 2018, the district's population had risen further to approximately 415,000 people.

== Economy ==
As of 2018, Zhangwan District reported a GDP of 55.905 billion Yuan, of which, the primary sector contributed 0.288 billion Yuan, the secondary sector contributed 37.462 billion Yuan, and the tertiary sector contributed 18.155 billion Yuan. In 2018, retail sales in the district totaled 15.3 billion Yuan, and government revenue totaled 1.09 billion Yuan.

Agriculture, forestry, animal husbandry, and fishing contributed 489 million Yuan to the district's economy in 2018, the majority of which came from agriculture. Major agricultural products in the district include wheat, corn, rice, and tea.

Industry in the district is dominated by Dongfeng Motors, which operates a number of manufacturing plants in the district, producing commercial vehicles, off-road vehicles, and auto chassis.

The district government is partaking in an ongoing poverty alleviation program, which it spent 390 million Yuan on in 2018, aiding 7,639 people.

A number of natural sites in the district have been outfitted with tourism infrastructure, and there is significant tourism to Dongfeng's current and historic plants in the district.

== Transportation ==
=== Rail ===
The Xiangyang–Chongqing railway runs through the district.

=== Road ===
National Highway 209, National Highway 316, and the Yinchuan-Wuhan section of the G70 Expressway all pass through the district.
