= Daliu Township, Hubei =

Daliu Township 大柳乡
- Township
- Location in Hubei
- Coordinates (Daliu government): 33°00′47″N 110°44′43″E
- Country: People's Republic of China
- Province: Hubei
- Prefecture-level city: Shiyan
- District: Yunyang
- Villages: 12
- Elevation: 735 m (2,411 ft)

Population (2010)
  - Total: 11,762
- Time zone: UTC+8 (China Standard)
- Postal code: 442529

Daliu (Chinese: 大柳; pinyin: Dàliǔ) is a township in Yunyang District (formerly known as Yun County) in the Qin Mountains of northwestern Hubei province, China, located more than 20 kilometres (12 mi) north-northwest of the county seat and 40 km (25 mi) north of downtown Shiyan. The township administers 12 villages.

== Administrative divisions ==
As of 2017, Daliu Township had twelve villages under its administration:

- Yangjia (杨家村), Shizigou (十字沟村), Jintang (金堂村), Zuoxisi (左溪寺村), Huanglongmiao (黄龙庙村), Songshuwan (松树湾村), Daliushu (大柳树村), Yuliang (余粮村), Huajiahe (华家河村), Gangzigou (杠子沟村), Shuangping (双坪村), Baiquan (白泉村)

== Demographics ==
Daliu Township has a population of 11,762 according to the 2010 Chinese Census, down from the 14,195 recorded in the 2000 Chinese Census.

The township has a hukou population of 14,143 as of 2019, up slightly from 14,138 in 2018.

== See also ==
- List of township-level divisions of Hubei
