= 戶籍 =

戶籍, 户籍, or 戸籍 means household register or family register in Chinese characters, and may also refer to:

- Hojeok or Hoju (户主), a family register system in both North and South Korea
- Hùjí or Hukou system (户口), the system of residency permits in mainland China
- Hùjí or Household registration in Taiwan (戶籍)
- Koseki, a Japanese family registry
- Hộ khẩu (户口), a family register and residence registration system in Vietnam
