= List of major power stations in Hubei province =

This article lists the major power stations located in Hubei province.

== Non-renewable ==
=== Coal, gas and fuel-oil-based ===
Station	Name in Chinese	Coordinates	Capacity (MW)	Operational units and (type)	Under construction units	Reference
Ezhou Power Station	鄂州电厂	30°33′04″N 114°38′32″E	5,960	2×330 MW, 2×600 MW, 2×1,050 MW, 2×1,000 MW		
Hanchuan Power Station	汉川电厂	30°39′26″N 113°54′56″E	5,200	4×300 MW, 2×1,000 MW	2×1,000 MW	
Dabieshan Power Station	大别山电厂	31°08′27″N 114°53′32″E	4,600	2×640 MW, 2×660 MW, 2×1,000 MW		
Puqi Power Station	蒲圻电厂	29°39′52″N 113°52′23″E	3,600	2×300 MW, 2×1,000 MW	1×1,000 MW	
Xiantao Power Station	仙桃电厂	30°22′13″N 113°33′56″E	2,640	2×660 MW	2×660 MW	
Xiangfan Power Station	襄樊电厂	31°54′45″N 112°10′00″E	2,400	4×300 MW, 2×600 MW		
Yangluo Power Station	阳逻电厂	30°41′38″N 114°32′35″E	2,400	4×300 MW, 2×600 MW		
Xisaishan Power Station	西塞山电厂	30°12′11″N 115°10′49″E	2,020	2×330 MW, 2×680 MW		
Yicheng Power Station	宜城电厂	31°46′49″N 112°07′42″E	2,000	2×1,000 MW		
Jingzhou Power Station	长源荆州电厂	30°17′48″N 112°18′29″E	1,360	2×330 MW, 2×350 MW		
Huadian Jiangling Power Station	华电江陵电厂	30°05′26″N 112°18′39″E	1,320	2×660 MW		
Suizhou Power Station	国能长源随州电厂	31°38′20″N 113°31′17″E	1,320	2×660 MW		
Jingmeng Power Station	荆门电厂	31°02′13″N 112°13′57″E	1,200	2×600 MW		
Qingshan Thermal Power Station	青山热电厂	30°37′46″N 114°26′05″E	860	1×200 MW, 2×330 MW		
Jingmeng (Huaneng) Power Station	华能荆门电厂	31°03′29″N 112°14′54″E	700	2×350 MW		
Yingcheng Thermal Power Station	华能应城热电厂	30°54′53″N 113°39′39″E	700	2×350 MW		
Shiyan Thermal Power Station	京能十堰热电厂	32°41′0″N 110°44′20″E	700	2×350 MW		
Yidu Dongyangguang Power Station	宜都东阳光公司自备热电厂	30°19′35″N 111°29′26″E	600	2×300 MW		

== Renewable ==
=== Hydroelectric ===
==== Conventional ====
Station	Name in Chinese	Coordinates	River	Capacity (MW)	Dam height (meters)	Status	Operational units	Under construction units
Sanxia (Three Gorges) Hydropower Station	三峡水利枢纽	30°49′34″N 111°00′26″E	Yangtze River	22,500	181	Operational	32×700 MW, 2×50 MW	
Gezhouba Hydropower Station	葛洲坝水利枢纽	30°44′22″N 111°16′11″E	Yangtze River	2,715	47	Operational	2×170 MW, 19×125 MW	
Shuibuya Hydropower Station	水布垭水电站	30°26′29″N 110°21′08″E	Qing River	1,600	233	Operational	4×400 MW	
Geheyan Hydropower Station	隔河岩水电站	30°28′05″N 111°08′20″E	Qing River	1,200	151	Operational	4×300 MW	
Danjiangkou Hydropower Station	丹江口水利枢纽	32°33′21″N 111°29′16″E	Han River	1,035	111.6 ×	Operational	5×175 MW, 1×165 MW	
Pankou Hydropower Station	潘口水电站	32°12′49″N 110°09′24″E	Du River	513	114.5	Operational	2×250 MW, 1×13 MW	
Huanglongtan Hydropower Station	黄龙滩水电站	32°40′35″N 110°31′22″E	Du River	510	107	Operational	2×85 MW, 2×170 MW	
Jiangpinghe Hydropower Station	江坪河水电站	29°44′19″N 110°20′51″E	Loushui River	450	219	Under construction		2×225MW
Gaobazhou Hydropower Station	高坝洲水电站	30°23′54″N 111°20′32″E	Qing River	252	57	Operational	3×84 MW	
Baihe Hydropower Station	白河水电站	32°52′25″N 110°01′12″E	Han River	180		Under construction	4×45 MW	

×The dam was raised 14.6 meters to 111.6 meters in 2010. The installed six 150 MW turbines increased their capacities accordingly.

==== Pumped-storage ====
Station	Name in Chinese	Coordinates	Capacity (MW)	Rated head (meters)	Status	Operational units	Under construction units
Nanzhang Pumped Storage Power Station	南漳张家坪抽水蓄能电站		1,800	514	UC		6×300 MW
Tongshan Pumped Storage Power Station	通山大幕山抽水蓄能电站		1,400		UC		4×350 MW
Ziyunshan Pumped Storage Power Station	紫云山抽水蓄能电站		1,400	503	UC		4×350 MW
Pingtanyuan Pumped Storage Power Station	平坦原抽水蓄能电站	31°05′07″N 115°34′15″E	1,400	597	UC		4×350 MW
Bailianhe Pumped Storage Power Station	白莲河抽水蓄能电站	30°36′33″N 115°27′15″E	1,200	195	Operational	4×300 MW	
Yuan'an Pumped Storage Power Station	远安宝华寺抽水蓄能电站		1,200		UC		4×300 MW
Songzi Pumped Storage Power Station	松滋江西观抽水蓄能电站		1,200	377	UC		4×300 MW
Qingjiang Pumped Storage Power Station	清江抽水蓄能电站		1,200		UC		4×300 MW
Weijiachong Pumped Storage Power Station	魏家冲抽水蓄能电站		300	168	UC		2×150 MW
Pankou Pumped Storage Power Station	潘口抽水蓄能电站		298		UC		2×149 MW

== See also ==
- List of power stations in China
