= Wudang Road Subdistrict =

Wudang Road Subdistrict 武当路街道
- Subdistrict
- Location within Hubei Location within China
- Coordinates: 32°35′30″N 110°47′56″E
- Country: China
- Province: Hubei
- Prefecture-level city: Shiyan
- District: Maojian District

Area
  - Total: 54.9 km^{2} (21.2 sq mi)

Population (2019)
  - Total: 54,075
  - Density: 985/km^{2} (2,550/sq mi)

Wudang Road Subdistrict (simplified Chinese: 武当路街道; traditional Chinese: 武當路街道; pinyin: Wǔdāng Lù Jiēdào) is a subdistrict in Maojian District, Shiyan, Hubei, China. The subdistrict is located in the eastern portion of Shiyan's urban core, bordered by Bailang Subdistrict to the east, Eryan Subdistrict to the west, Saiwudang (Chinese: 赛武当, a nature reserve) to the south, and the Dongcheng Development Zone (Chinese: 东城开发区; pinyin: Dōngchéng Kāifā Qū) to the north. Wudang Road Subdistrict spans an area of 54.9 square kilometres (21.2 mi^{2}), and has a hukou population of 54,075 as of 2019.

== Geography ==
A medium-sized reservoir called the Majiahe Reservoir (Chinese: 马家河水库; pinyin: Mǎjiāhé Shuǐkù) is located in Wudang Road Subdistrict.

== Administrative divisions ==
Wudang Road Subdistrict administers eight residential communities and three administrative villages.

=== Residential communities ===
The subdistrict administers the following eight residential communities:

- Gujiagang Community (Chinese: 顾家岗社区)
- Gongjiawan Community (Chinese: 龚家湾社区)
- Lubei Community (Chinese: 路北社区)
- Majiahe Community (Chinese: 马家河社区)
- Tiesanchu Community (Chinese: 铁三处社区)
- Hanjiagou Community (Chinese: 韩家沟社区)
- Sanqiao Community (Chinese: 三桥社区)
- Wenjiagou Community (Chinese: 文家沟社区)

=== Villages ===
The subdistrict administers the following three villages:

- Gujia Village (Chinese: 顾家村)
- Yankou Village (Chinese: 堰口村)
- Majiahe Village (Chinese: 马家河村)

== Demographics ==
As of 2019, there are 54,075 people belonging to 21,024 households registered under the subdistrict's hukou. This is up from the 52,570 people belonging to 17,457 households in 2018.

== Transportation ==
Major roads that run through Wudang Road Subdistrict include Wudang Avenue (Chinese: 武当大道; pinyin: Wǔdāng Dàdào), Chongqing Road (Chinese: 重庆路; pinyin: Chóngqìng Lù), Maxiao Road (Chinese: 马小路; pinyin: Mǎxiǎo Lù), and Xiangyang Road (Chinese: 襄阳路; pinyin: Xiāngyáng Lù).

== See also ==
- List of township-level divisions of Hubei
