= 2021 Shiyan pipeline explosion =

2021 explosion in Shiyan, Hubei, China

- Date: 13 June 2021
- Time: 6:30 (UTC+8)
- Location: Shiyan, Hubei, China; 32°37′03.8″N 110°45′07.4″E
- Deaths: 26
- Injuries: 138

2021 Shiyan pipeline explosion, officially June 13 Yanhu Community Pedlar's Market Severe Gas Explosion Accident in Zhangwan District, Shiyan, Hubei (Chinese: 湖北省十堰市张湾区艳湖社区集贸市场“6·13”重大燃气爆炸事故) was a gas explosion took place at about 6:30 a.m. local time in Yanhu Community, Checheng Road Subdistrict, Zhangwan District, Shiyan, Hubei on 13 June 2021 in a market, which then collapsed. Locals who were buying vegetables or having breakfast at the market were trapped by the explosion. The explosion resulted in 25 deaths and 138 injuries (including 37 serious injuries).

== Accident ==
At 6:30 a.m. a gas line exploded near a vegetable market killing 26 and injuring 138. 173 fire fighters rescued 150 from building severely damaged by the blast.

== Casualties ==
25 people were killed and 138 others injured, according to China Central Television.

In the final report, the total death reached 26.

== Investigation ==
=== Accusations and administrative measures ===
11 persons were arrested and prosecuted as they were responsible for the accident.

4 persons were fined and prohibited from gas industry for life.

34 government officers were responsible for the accident, receiving disciplinary measures, including 1 placed on probation within the Chinese Communist Party (CCP) with dismissal of government affairs, 2 revocation of CCP positions with dismissal of government affairs, 6 serious warnings within the CCP, 3 serious warnings within the CCP with major demerits in government affairs, 2 major demerits in government affairs, 4 warnings within the CCP, 5 warnings in government affairs, 6 admonitions, 5 mandatory written self-criticism. Shiyan Committee of the CCP and Shiyan City Government were mandated to make penetrating self-criticism to Hubei Committee of the CCP and Hubei Province Government.

== See also ==
- List of pipeline accidents
