= Yunyang, Shiyan =

Yunyang 郧阳区
- District
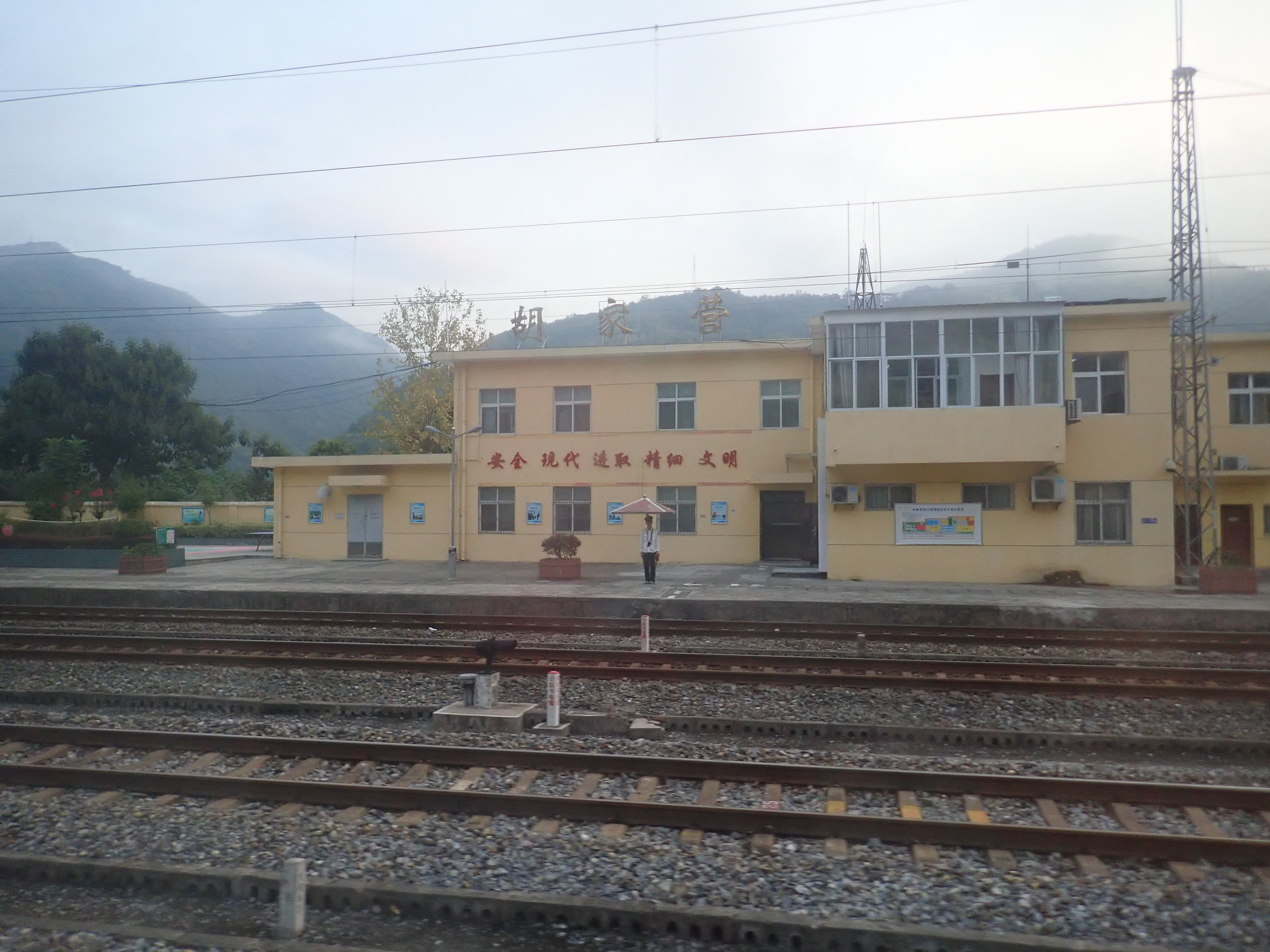
- Hujiaying Railway Station

- Location in Hubei
- Coordinates (Yunyang government): 32°50′05″N 110°48′43″E
- Country: People's Republic of China
- Province: Hubei
- Prefecture-level city: Shiyan

Area
  - Total: 3,863 km^{2} (1,492 sq mi)

Population (2020)
  - Total: 395,222
  - Density: 102.3/km^{2} (265.0/sq mi)
- Time zone: UTC+8 (China Standard)
- Website: www.hbyx.gov.cn

Yunyang District (simplified Chinese: 郧阳区; traditional Chinese: 鄖陽區; pinyin: Yúnyáng Qū), formerly Yun County or Yunxian (simplified Chinese: 郧县; traditional Chinese: 鄖縣; pinyin: Yún Xiàn), is a district of the prefecture-level city of Shiyan in northwestern Hubei Province, China. It borders the provinces of Henan (to the northeast) and Shaanxi (to the north and west). The district spans an area of 3,863 square kilometers, and has a permanent population of 395,222 as of 2020.

== History ==
In 1989 and 1992, the Yunxian Man, two crania of a species of Homo, were found, dated to 900,000 years ago, and showing features of both Homo erectus and Homo sapiens.

== Geography ==
Approximately 60% of the district is forested.

The Han River runs through the district, as well as its tributary Du River, and the Tao River.

== Climate ==
Climate data for Yunyang, elevation 245 m (804 ft), (1991–2020 normals, extremes 1981–2010)
Month	Jan	Feb	Mar	Apr	May	Jun	Jul	Aug	Sep	Oct	Nov	Dec	Year
Record high °C (°F)	21.1 (70.0)	24.0 (75.2)	34.1 (93.4)	36.7 (98.1)	37.8 (100.0)	41.3 (106.3)	41.3 (106.3)	41.2 (106.2)	39.5 (103.1)	34.3 (93.7)	28.7 (83.7)	21.6 (70.9)	41.3 (106.3)
Mean daily maximum °C (°F)	8.5 (47.3)	11.5 (52.7)	16.8 (62.2)	23.3 (73.9)	27.8 (82.0)	31.2 (88.2)	32.7 (90.9)	31.6 (88.9)	27.0 (80.6)	21.9 (71.4)	16.0 (60.8)	10.6 (51.1)	21.6 (70.8)
Daily mean °C (°F)	3.6 (38.5)	6.2 (43.2)	11.0 (51.8)	17.0 (62.6)	21.7 (71.1)	25.6 (78.1)	27.6 (81.7)	26.6 (79.9)	22.1 (71.8)	16.8 (62.2)	10.9 (51.6)	5.6 (42.1)	16.2 (61.2)
Mean daily minimum °C (°F)	0.0 (32.0)	2.2 (36.0)	6.5 (43.7)	11.9 (53.4)	16.9 (62.4)	21.1 (70.0)	24.0 (75.2)	23.1 (73.6)	18.6 (65.5)	13.2 (55.8)	7.2 (45.0)	2.0 (35.6)	12.2 (54.0)
Record low °C (°F)	−6.3 (20.7)	−7.1 (19.2)	−3.4 (25.9)	−0.4 (31.3)	8.4 (47.1)	14.5 (58.1)	17.1 (62.8)	15.1 (59.2)	10.5 (50.9)	2.2 (36.0)	−3.0 (26.6)	−10.3 (13.5)	−10.3 (13.5)
Average precipitation mm (inches)	17.7 (0.70)	17.5 (0.69)	39.1 (1.54)	55.9 (2.20)	82.4 (3.24)	91.6 (3.61)	133.3 (5.25)	123.2 (4.85)	101.0 (3.98)	71.3 (2.81)	34.9 (1.37)	12.4 (0.49)	780.3 (30.73)
Average precipitation days (≥ 0.1 mm)	5.4	6.3	8.5	8.9	10.5	10.1	11.8	12.1	11.7	10.7	7.6	5.6	109.2
Average snowy days	4.1	2.9	1.1	0	0	0	0	0	0	0	0.7	2.0	10.8
Average relative humidity (%)	67	66	66	67	67	70	77	77	77	76	73	67	71
Mean monthly sunshine hours	136.9	130.1	171.4	194.6	205.8	208.9	222.6	210.7	160.4	151.7	140.3	141.1	2,074.5
Percentage possible sunshine	43	41	46	50	48	49	51	52	44	44	45	46	47
Source: China Meteorological Administration

== Administrative divisions ==
The district administers 16 towns, 3 townships, and 1 township-level forestry area.

The district's 16 towns are Anyang, Yangxipu, Qingqu, Baisangguan, Nanhuatang, Bailang, Liudong, Tanshan, Meipu, Qingshan, Chadian, Liubei, Baoxia, Hujiaying, Tanjiawan, and Chengguan.

The district's 3 townships are Daliu Township, Wufeng Township, and Yeda Township.

The district also administers the Hongyanbei Forestry Area (红岩背林场), which operates as a township-level division.

== Economy ==
As of 2016, there were 461,100 people living in agrarian households (hukou) throughout the district. The district is home to 663 agricultural businesses, including 183 agricultural co-operatives. Cultivated land in the district totaled 611,500 mu as of 2016. 96.4% of the district's agricultural production is crop farming, with forestry, animal husbandry, aquaculture, and agricultural services comprising the remaining 3.6%. The living conditions of the district's agrarian population varies greatly, and substandard living conditions are not uncommon. 21.3% of the district's agrarian population lives in bamboo structures, 44.4% of the district's agrarian population does not source their water from protected sources, 90.8% of agrarian households report frequently using firewood for energy needs, 87.4% of the agrarian population does not have access to flush toilets, and the majority of agrarian households do not have access to air conditioning or computers.

100% of the district's villages have access to electricity and landlines, 90.7% have cable TV installed, and 88.4% have access to broadband.

== Transportation ==
The Xiangyang–Chongqing railway passes through the district.
