= Checheng Road Subdistrict =

Checheng Road Subdistrict 车城路街道
- Subdistrict
- Location within Hubei Location within China
- Coordinates: 32°38′16″N 110°45′31″E
- Country: China
- Province: Hubei
- Prefecture-level city: Shiyan
- District: Zhangwan District

Population (2019)
  - Total: 79,315

Checheng Road Subdistrict (simplified Chinese: 车城路街道; traditional Chinese: 車城路街道; pinyin: Chēchéng Lù Jiēdào) is a subdistrict of Zhangwan District, Shiyan, Hubei. The subdistrict has a population of 79,315 as of 2019.

Checheng Road is highly developed with many automobile factories owned by Dongfeng Motor Corporation.

It was the location of the 2021 Shiyan pipeline explosion.

== Administrative divisions ==
Checheng Road Subdistrict includes 12 the following residential communities and 1 administrative village.

- Yanhu Community (Chinese: 艳湖社区, formerly Sanchahe Village)
- Jingtan Community (Chinese: 镜潭社区, formerly Youfangyuan Village)
- Kangle Community (Chinese: 康乐社区)
- Zhangwan Community (Chinese: 张湾社区, formerly Haojia Village)
- Gaojiawan Community (Chinese: 高家湾社区)
- People’s Square Community (Chinese: 人民广场社区)
- Gongyixincun Community (Chinese: 工艺新村社区)
- Gongyuan Community (Chinese: 公园社区)
- Checheng West Road Community (Chinese: 车城西路社区)
- Dongyuegutai Community (Chinese: 东岳古台社区)
- Yanling Community (Chinese: 岩岭社区)
- Lanshanjun Community (Chinese: 蓝山郡社区)
- Xiejia Village (Chinese: 谢家村)
