= Huanglongtan Dam =

- Location within China
- Country: China
- Location: Shiyan
- Coordinates: 32°40′33″N 110°31′22″E
- Status: Operational
- Construction began: 1969
- Opening date: 1976
- Owner: Hubei Provincial Government

Dam and spillways
- Type of dam: Concrete gravity
- Impounds: Du River
- Height: 107 m (351 ft)
- Length: 371 m (1,217 ft)
- Elevation at crest: 252 m (827 ft)
- Width (crest): 20 m (66 ft)
- Dam volume: 980,000 m^{3} (1,281,792 cu yd)
- Spillway type: Controlled, six sluice gates
- Spillway capacity: 11,200 m^{3}/s (395,524 cu ft/s)

Reservoir
- Total capacity: 1,228,000,000 m^{3} (995,556 acre⋅ft)
- Catchment area: 11,140 km^{2} (4,301 sq mi)
- Normal elevation: 247 m (810 ft)

Power Station
- Commission date: 1974/2004
- Turbines: 2 x 85 MW; 2 x 170 MW; Francis-type
- Installed capacity: 510 MW

The Huanglongtan Dam is a concrete gravity dam located on the Du River, a tributary of the Han River. It is located 25 km (16 mi) west of Shiyan in Hubei Province, China. The main purpose of the dam is hydroelectric power generation but it also provides for flood control. It was constructed between 1969 and 1976 and support a 510 MW power station.

== Background ==
The Huanglongtan Dam and two other projects on the river (Songshuling and Pankou Dams) were surveyed in 1954 and final designs were prepared in 1964. Construction on Huanglongtan, the first of the projects to be implemented, began in April 1969. The original 85 MW generators were commissioned in 1974 and the dam was complete in 1976. The entire project was accepted by the state in 1978. In 1980, the dam experienced a 50-year flood with river flow peaking at 11,500 m^{3}/s (406,119 cu ft/s). The flood inundated the power station as the dam was not prepared for the inflow. This was due to mis-communication within the basin and a lack of a proper hydrological forecast system. In May 2003 the dam's power plant underwent an expansion which included the installation of two new 170 MW Francis turbines along with a new power house and water delivery system. The first of the two generators was operational at the end of 2004 and the project complete in 2005.

== Design ==
The concrete gravity dam is 107 m (351 ft) tall, 371 m (1,217 ft) long and has a structural volume of 980,000 m^{3} (1,281,792 cu yd). The dam's crest is 20 m (66 ft) wide and sits at an elevation of 252 m (827 ft) above sea level. Sitting at the head of a 11,140 km^{2} (4,301 sq mi) catchment area, the dam withholds a reservoir of 1,228,000,000 m^{3} (995,556 acre⋅ft) of which 150,000,000 m^{3} (121,607 acre⋅ft) is reserved for flood storage. Normal reservoir elevation is 247 m (810 ft). The dam's spillway consists of six 12 m (39 ft) high and 10 m (33 ft) wide sluice gates and has a maximum discharge capacity of 11,200 m^{3}/s (395,524 cu ft/s). The dam's original power station is located just downstream on the left bank of the river and contains 2 x 85 MW Francis turbine-generators. The expansion power plant is located 200 m (656 ft) away from the original and contains 2 x 170 MW Francis turbine-generators.

== See also ==
- Pankou Dam – located upstream
- List of dams and reservoirs in China
- List of major power stations in Hubei
