= Dachuan (disambiguation) =

Dachuan may refer to any of the following places in China:

== Places ==
As 大川:

- Dachuan town of Zhouqu County, Gannan, Gansu
- Dachuan town of Eryan Subdistrict, Maojian District, Shiyan, Hubei
- Dachuan town of Lushan County, Sichuan
- Dachuan subdistrict of Wangqing County, Yanbian Korean Autonomous Prefecture, Jilin

As 达川:

- Dachuan District of Dazhou City, Sichuan
- Dachuan town of Xigu District, Lanzhou, Gansu
