= Jiuzhang =

Jiuzhang may refer to:

- Jiuzhang suanshu, or The Nine Chapters on the Mathematical Art, Chinese mathematics book, composed from the 10th–2nd century BCE
- Shu shu Jiuzhang, or Mathematical Treatise in Nine Sections, 13th century Chinese mathematical text by Qin Jiushao
- Jiu Zhang, collection of poems attributed to Qu Yuan
- Nine Chapter Law, or Jiuzhang Lü, law of the Han dynasty
- Jiuzhang (quantum computer), a model quantum computer developed by University of Science and Technology of China
- Zhao Jiuzhang, Chinese scientist
