= Dongfeng High School =

Chinese high school

Dongfeng High School, whose short name is "Dong Gao" and "Dongfeng No.1 High School", is located in Shiyan City, Hubei Province, China, People's republic. It is highly recognized provincial wise and state wise, with reputation of exporting excellent graduates into many elite Universities in China and abroad.

Dongfeng High School was formally founded in 1978, by Second Automobile Works, now expanded and renamed as "Dongfeng Motor Corporation", as a public school for families of company employees. Currently, the major component of student body is still company employee's family, however, a larger proportion of non-company registered students are entering this institution.

There are around 256 regular faculty members in residence, with 3000 students in freshman year, sophomore and junior years in total. The School motto is "砺志 励学 立德 立人", which means: set goals, study hard, keep your virtue and be a real good human being.

Dongfeng High School is located at the northwestern area of Hubei province, which is geographically between Qin Mountains and Daba Mountains. This area is a typical mountainous region in central China. Dongfeng High School is located at the north part of Gongyuan Rd, Tiangou Xiang, with her back facing the Sifang natural conservation. The buildings and infrastructures follow the stepped-up fashion with 3 distinguished platforms, due to the hilly natural of this area.
