= Zhuxi County =

Zhuxi County 竹溪县 Chuki
- County
- Location of the seat in Hubei
- Coordinates: 32°19′06″N 109°42′55″E
- Country: People's Republic of China
- Province: Hubei
- Prefecture-level city: Shiyan

Area
  - Total: 3,299 km^{2} (1,274 sq mi)

Population (2010)
  - Total: 315,259
  - Density: 95.56/km^{2} (247.5/sq mi)
- Time zone: UTC+8 (China Standard)
- Website: www.zhuxi.gov.cn

Zhuxi County (simplified Chinese: 竹溪县; traditional Chinese: 竹谿縣; pinyin: Zhúxī Xiàn) is a county in the northwest of Hubei province, People's Republic of China, bordering Shaanxi to the west and Chongqing to the southwest. It is under the administration of the prefecture-level city of Shiyan. The county spans an area of 3,279 km^{2} (1,266 sq mi), and has a population of 315,259 as of 2010.

== Toponymy ==
The name Zhuxi County is named for the Zhuxi River, whose name (Chinese: 竹溪河; pinyin: Zhúxī Hé; lit. 'bamboo stream river') was derived from the large amounts of bamboo forests which bordered both sides of the river.

== History ==
The area of present-day Zhuxi County once belong to the Chu State. Part of the remains of the Great Wall of Chu, which possibly date back to the 3rd century BCE.

Zhuxi County was established in 1476 under the reign of the Chenghua Emperor.

In 1914, it was placed under the jurisdiction of Xiangyang Circuit. In 1932, the Republic of China introduced Administrative Inspectorates, and the county was assigned to the 11th Administrative Inspectorate of Hubei Province. In 1936, it was reassigned to the 8th Administrative Inspectorate of Hubei Province.

In 1949, under the People's Republic of China, Zhuxi County was assigned to Liangyun Prefecture, which was renamed to Yunyang Prefecture the following year.

The county was moved to Xiangyang Prefecture in 1952, but was moved back to Yunyang Prefecture in 1965.

In 1994, Zhuxi County was placed under the prefecture-level city of Shiyan, where it remains today.

In 2010, Longba was upgraded from a township to a town. In 2013, Bingying and Huiwan were upgraded from townships to towns.

== Geography ==
The county's geography is fairly mountainous, with its highest point reaching approximately 2,740 metres (8,990 ft) in height. The county's main rivers are the Zhuxi River and the Huiwan River, which both flow into the larger Han River.

=== Climate ===
Zhuxi County experiences an average annual temperature of 14 °C (57 °F), and an average annual precipitation of 1,000 millimetres (39 in).

Climate data for Zhuxi, elevation 448 m (1,470 ft), (1991–2020 normals, extremes 1981–present)
Month	Jan	Feb	Mar	Apr	May	Jun	Jul	Aug	Sep	Oct	Nov	Dec	Year
Record high °C (°F)	18.5 (65.3)	24.0 (75.2)	34.4 (93.9)	34.5 (94.1)	36.7 (98.1)	38.3 (100.9)	39.4 (102.9)	38.5 (101.3)	38.6 (101.5)	31.6 (88.9)	26.0 (78.8)	19.4 (66.9)	39.4 (102.9)
Mean daily maximum °C (°F)	7.9 (46.2)	11.1 (52.0)	16.3 (61.3)	22.5 (72.5)	26.1 (79.0)	29.5 (85.1)	31.6 (88.9)	30.6 (87.1)	25.7 (78.3)	20.4 (68.7)	14.8 (58.6)	9.4 (48.9)	20.5 (68.9)
Daily mean °C (°F)	2.2 (36.0)	4.9 (40.8)	9.4 (48.9)	15.2 (59.4)	19.5 (67.1)	23.4 (74.1)	25.8 (78.4)	24.8 (76.6)	20.3 (68.5)	15.0 (59.0)	9.0 (48.2)	3.7 (38.7)	14.4 (58.0)
Mean daily minimum °C (°F)	−1.4 (29.5)	0.8 (33.4)	4.6 (40.3)	10.0 (50.0)	14.6 (58.3)	19.0 (66.2)	21.9 (71.4)	21.1 (70.0)	16.9 (62.4)	11.7 (53.1)	5.4 (41.7)	0.2 (32.4)	10.4 (50.7)
Record low °C (°F)	−12.4 (9.7)	−7.3 (18.9)	−4.9 (23.2)	−0.3 (31.5)	5.3 (41.5)	11.5 (52.7)	12.6 (54.7)	14.0 (57.2)	7.3 (45.1)	0.3 (32.5)	−3.9 (25.0)	−18.7 (−1.7)	−18.7 (−1.7)
Average precipitation mm (inches)	11.2 (0.44)	17.4 (0.69)	45.2 (1.78)	70.1 (2.76)	105.2 (4.14)	134.5 (5.30)	153.2 (6.03)	145.7 (5.74)	117.7 (4.63)	88.6 (3.49)	34.6 (1.36)	12.4 (0.49)	935.8 (36.85)
Average precipitation days (≥ 0.1 mm)	6.6	7.2	10.5	10.6	12.8	12.3	13.3	12.8	13.1	12.0	8.7	6.8	126.7
Average snowy days	4.7	3.6	1.2	0	0	0	0	0	0	0	0.9	2.4	12.8
Average relative humidity (%)	81	78	77	77	78	79	83	84	85	86	85	83	81
Mean monthly sunshine hours	103.8	101.4	138.3	161.0	167.7	176.2	194.4	180.8	120.8	105.9	102.9	102.2	1,655.4
Percentage possible sunshine	32	32	37	41	39	41	45	44	33	30	33	33	37
Source: China Meteorological Administration

== Administrative divisions ==
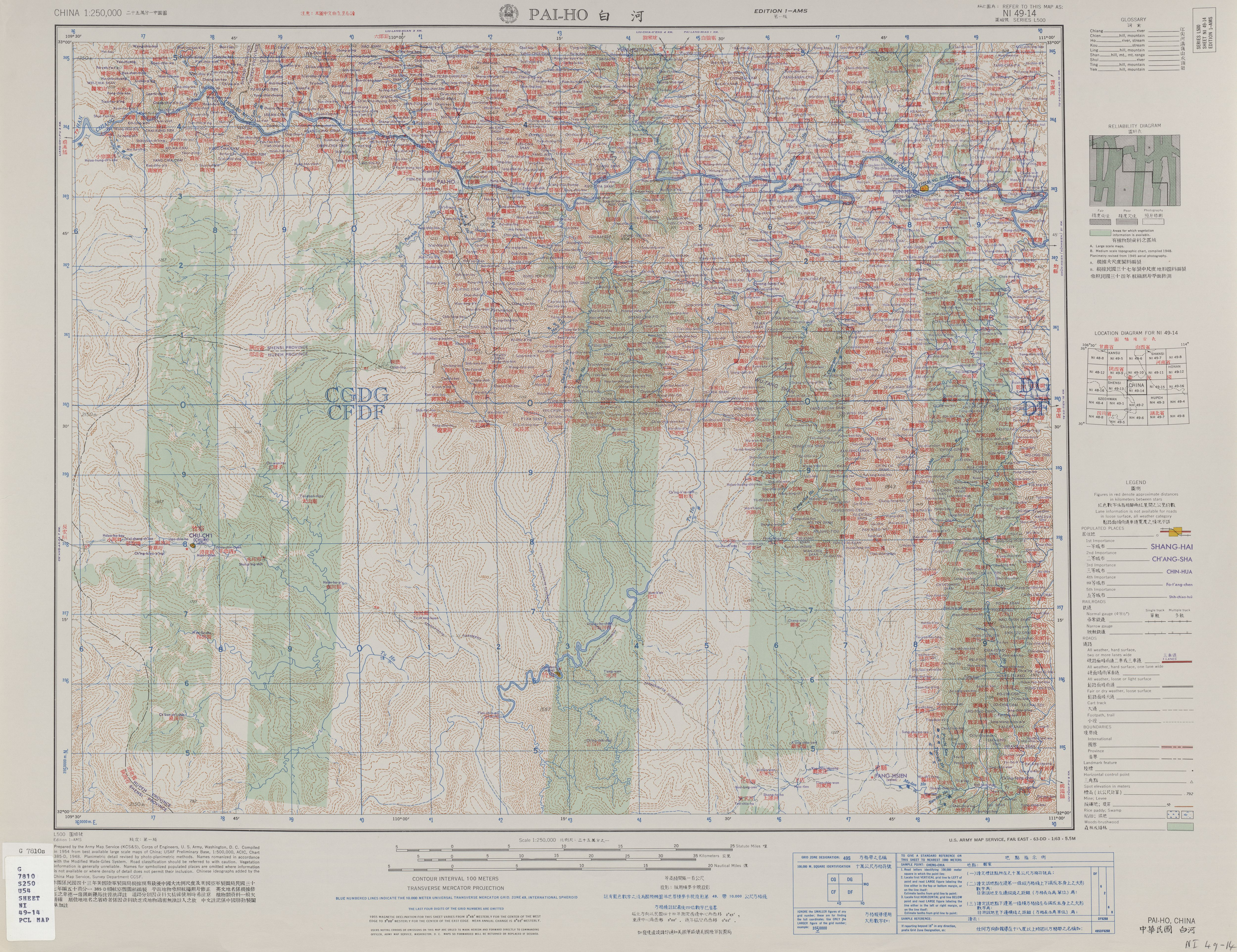
Map including Zhuxi (labeled as CHU-CH'I (CHUKI) (walled) 竹谿) (1954)

Zhuxi County is divided into eleven towns, four townships, and eight other township-level divisions.

Its eleven towns are Chengguan, Jiangjiayan, Zhongfeng, Shuiping, Xianhe, Quanxi, Fengxi, Longba, Bingying, Huiwan, and Xinzhou.

Its four townships are Eping Township, Tianbao Township, Taoyuan Township, and Xiangba Township.

Its other township level divisions are Longwaya Tea Farm (Chinese: 龙王垭茶场), Guoying Zhuxi Comprehensive Farm (Chinese: 国营竹溪综合农场), Stock Seed Farm (Chinese: 原种场), Fishing Stock Farm (Chinese: 渔种场), Zhongxu Field (Chinese: 种畜场), Wangjiashan Tea Farm (Chinese: 王家山茶场), Biaohu Tree Farm (Chinese: 标湖林场), and Shuangzhu Tree Farm (Chinese: 双竹林场).

== Economy ==
Zhuxi County has sizable deposits of coal, limestone, and marble. The county is also home to the most Taxus chinensis production of a county in China.
