= Pankou Dam =

- Location within China
- Country: China
- Location: Zhushan County, Hubei Province
- Coordinates: 32°12′44.25″N 110°9′8.57″E
- Purpose: Power, flood control
- Status: Operational
- Construction began: 2008
- Opening date: 2012; 14 years ago

Dam and spillways
- Type of dam: Embankment, concrete-face rock-fill
- Impounds: Du River
- Height: 114 m (374 ft)
- Elevation at crest: 362 m (1,188 ft)
- Width (crest): 9.2 m (30 ft)

Reservoir
- Total capacity: 1,970,000,000 m^{3} (1,597,105 acre⋅ft)
- Catchment area: 8,950 km^{2} (3,460 mi^{2})
- Normal elevation: 355 m (1,165 ft)

Pankou Hydropower Station
- Commission date: 2012
- Type: Conventional
- Hydraulic head: 83 m (272 ft)
- Turbines: 2 x 250 MW Francis-type, 1 x 13 MW Francis-type
- Installed capacity: 513 MW

The Pankou Dam is a concrete-face rock-fill dam on the Du River about 74 km (46 mi) southwest of Shiyan in Zhushan County of Hubei Province, China. The purpose of the dam is hydroelectric power production and flood control. It supports a 513 MW power station located at its base. At a normal reservoir elevation of 355 m (1,165 ft), the reservoir withholds 1,970,000,000 m^{3} (1,597,105 acre⋅ft) of water. However, it can hold up to 2,338,000,000 m^{3} (1,895,447 acre⋅ft) in the event of a flood. Construction on the dam began in May 2008 and its generators were commissioned in 2012.

== See also ==
- Huanglongtan Dam – located downstream
- List of dams and reservoirs in China
- List of tallest dams in China
