= Maojian, Shiyan =

Maojian 茅箭区
- District
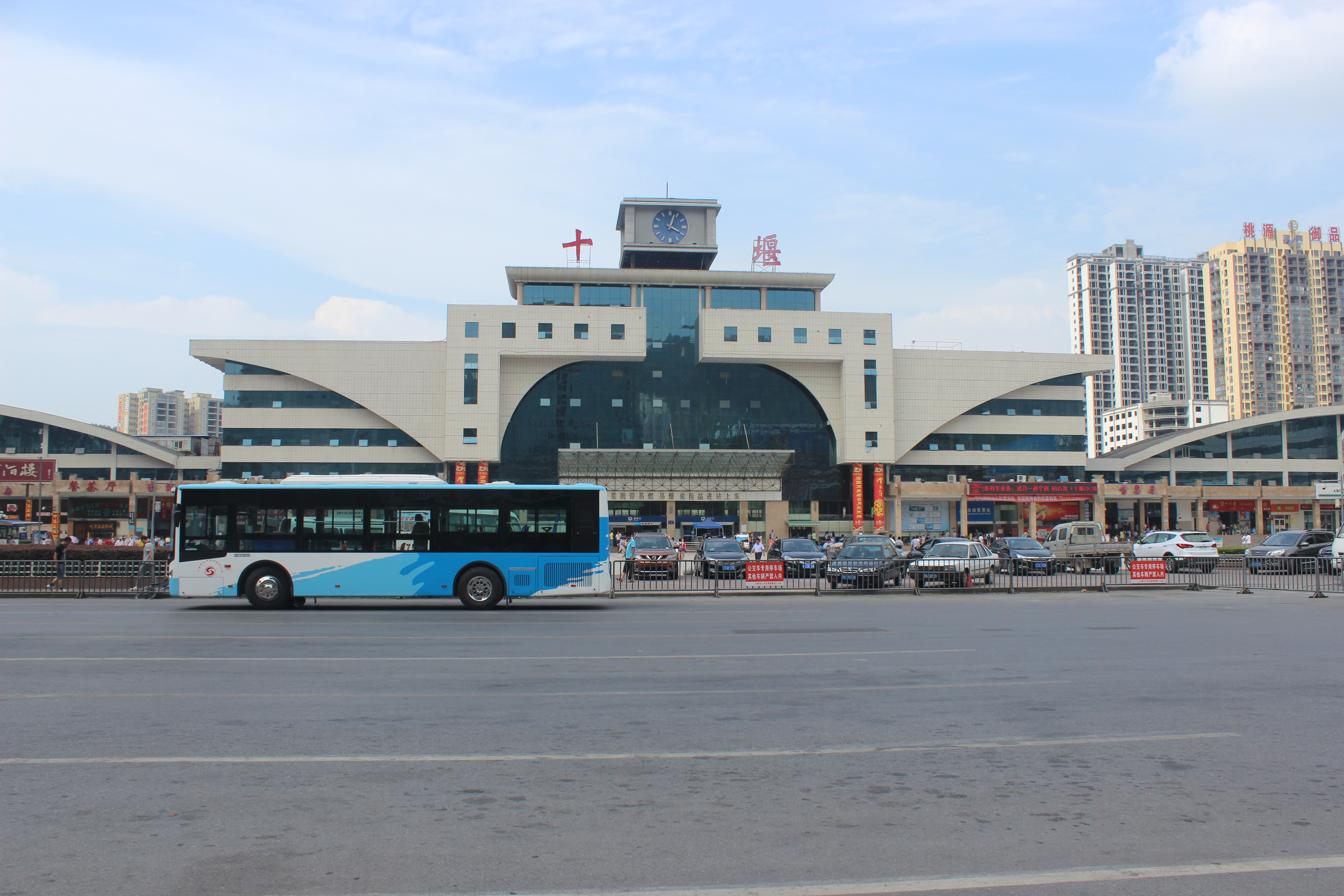
- Shiyan Railway Station

- Location in Hubei
- Coordinates (Maojian government): 32°35′31″N 110°48′47″E
- Country: People's Republic of China
- Province: Hubei
- Prefecture-level city: Shiyan
- Seat: Wudang Road Subdistrict

Area
  - Total: 578 km^{2} (223 sq mi)

Population (2020)
  - Total: 601,548
  - Density: 1,040/km^{2} (2,700/sq mi)
- Time zone: UTC+8 (China Standard)
- Postal code: 432012
- Website: maojian.shiyan.gov.cn

Maojian District (simplified Chinese: 茅箭区; traditional Chinese: 茅箭區; pinyin: Máojiàn Qū) is a district in the prefecture-level city of Shiyan, Hubei, China. Maojian District spans an area of 578 square kilometers, and is home to 601,548 permanent residents (huji population). The district serves as the seat of government for the city of Shiyan.

== Geography ==
The district sits at the foot of the Wudang Mountains, and has an elevation ranging from 187 to 1,723 meters in height.

=== Climate ===
Maojian District experiences a warm subtropical climate characterized with dry winters. The district experiences an average annual temperature of 15.3 °C, an average of 246 days without frost, and an average annual precipitation totaling 884.9 millimetres (34.84 in).

== Administrative divisions ==
Maojian District is divided into four subdistricts, one town, and two townships. The district's four subdistricts are Wudang Road Subdistrict, Eryan Subdistrict, Wuyan Subdistrict, and Bailang Subdistrict, respectively. The district's sole town is Dachuan. The district's two townships are Maota Township and Yuanyang Township. The district government is seated in Wudang Road Subdistrict.

== Economy ==
Maojian District is the economic center of Shiyan, and is home to much of the city's industry, as well as the majority of its retail. The district is home to a number of Dongfeng Motor's production facilities, which produce passenger vehicles, light commercial vehicles, heavy duty trucks, and various auto parts.

The district has reported GDP of 6.95 billion Yuan in the first quarter of 2020, a 28.1% decrease from the previous quarter, likely attributed to the COVID-19 pandemic in China. Of this, 0.29% of the district's GDP came from the primary sector, 21.15% of the district's GDP came from the secondary sector, and 78.56% of the district's GDP came from the tertiary sector.
