= Hộ khẩu =

Household registration system used in Vietnam

The hộ khẩu is a family register and residence registration system in Vietnam. Hộ (戶) is the Sino-Vietnamese word for "household," and khẩu (口) is the word "mouth", hộ khẩu itself meaning "household member." The local authority issues to each household a "household registration book" or sổ hộ khẩu, in which the basic biographical information of each household member is recorded. The sổ hộ khẩu is the ultimate legal proof of residence in Vietnam. Together with the "citizen identification card" or giấy chứng minh nhân dân/căn cước công dân, the sổ hộ khẩu constitutes the most important legal identification document in Vietnam.

== Background ==
Modeled after the Chinese hukou system and originally used in urban areas only, hộ khẩu functioned as a way to manage urban growth and limit how many people moved, as well as who moved in and out of the cities. Gradually, the system became a universal method of control as its application expanded to the countryside. It helped the government keep track of not just movement but also births and deaths. And at certain point during the latter half of the twentieth century, a tight local surveillance system existed to ensure that people were sleeping at the address they had registered as their own. This had led to its unintended reputation as a system designed for "the prevention of extramarital affairs."

== Complexity and inequality ==
Even after substantial reforms in the 1990s, the hộ khẩu system is often considered complicated and cumbersome. It defines four types of residence, KT1 through KT4. KT1 is the primary and permanent type of residence, and denotes a person's primary residential address. If this person moves on a semi-permanent basis to another place within the same province or national municipality (within Ho Chi Minh City, for example), then he or she needs to register for a KT2 residential status at that new address. If this same move happens across provincial borders, then the person has to sign up for a KT3 registration. For migrant workers and students temporarily residing outside of their province or national municipality of permanent residence, they need to apply for a KT4 registration. Navigating this matrix of regulations is tough. But the public security apparatus that manages the hộ khẩu system is also difficult to deal with, especially if one is a poor migrant worker with little to no formal education. Yet hộ khẩu remains absolutely crucial, especially for the poor. It is tied to access to welfare benefits, and, in the case of children, the right to attend public school. For a migrant family in Saigon with no KT3 or KT4 registration, subsidised medical care, poverty assistance, and almost-free schooling are all out of reach.

== Move to digital format ==
In 2017, the government of Vietnam changed the registration system; instead of the registration books, citizens now use an online database. The effects of this transition are unclear, since the use of the registration books continues throughout many provinces.

From July 1, 2021, the new issuance and registration of paper household registration books will be stopped. According to the 2020 Residence Law, all household registration books issued to Vietnamese citizens will expire on January 1, 2023.

== See also ==
- Hukou
- Koseki
