= Bailianhe Pumped Storage Power Station =

- Interactive map of Bailianhe Pumped Storage Power Station
- Official name: 白莲河抽水蓄能电站
- Country: China
- Location: Luotian County
- Coordinates: 30°36′06″N 115°26′57″E
- Status: Operational
- Construction began: 2004
- Opening date: 2010
- Owner: State Grid Xinyuan Co Ltd

Upper reservoir
- Creates: Bailianhe Upper Reservoir
- Total capacity: 24,960,000 m^{3} (20,235 acre⋅ft)

Lower reservoir
- Creates: Bailianhe Reservoir
- Total capacity: 1,232,000,000 m^{3} (998,799 acre⋅ft)

Power Station
- Hydraulic head: 195 m (640 ft)
- Pump-generators: 4 x 300 MW (400,000 hp) Francis pump turbines
- Installed capacity: 1,200 MW (1,600,000 hp)
- Annual generation: 967 million kWh

The Bailianhe Pumped Storage Power Station (Chinese: 白莲河抽水蓄能电站) is a pumped-storage hydroelectric power station located 58 kilometres (36 mi) east of Huanggang in Hubei Province, China. It was constructed between 2004 and 2010 and has an installed capacity of 1,200 megawatts (1,600,000 hp). The power station operates by shifting water between an upper and lower reservoir to generate electricity. For this project, only the upper reservoir had to be created as an existing reservoir, the Bailianhe Reservoir, was used as the lower. During periods of low energy demand, such as at night, water is pumped from Bailianhe Reservoir up to the upper reservoir. When energy demand is high, the water is released back down to the lower reservoir but the pump turbines that pumped the water up now reverse mode and serve as generators to produce electricity. The process is repeated as necessary and the plant serves as a peaking power plant.

The Bailianhe Upper Reservoir was created with the construction of a 59.4-metre (195 ft) tall concrete-face rock-fill dam. It has a crest length of 300 metres (980 ft) and can storage up to 24,960,000 m^{3} (20,235 acre⋅ft) of which 16,630,000 cubic metres (13,480 acre⋅ft) can be used for power generation. The lower Bailianhe Reservoir was constructed on the Lotus River in the 1960s by an embankment dam as part of an irrigation plan for the region and to supply water for a small run-the-river power plant still in operation. It has a storage capacity of 1,232,000,000 cubic metres (999,000 acre⋅ft).

The power station contains four 300-megawatt (400,000 hp) Francis pump turbines and the change in elevation between the upper and lower reservoirs affords a rated hydraulic head of 195 metres (640 ft). While generating electricity, the pump-generators produce 967 million kWh annually but consume 1,289 kWh when pumping. Pumping when energy is low in demand and cheap helps cover the excess cost.
