= Nine Chapter Law =

Legislation in the Han dynasty (202 BC–220 AD)

The Nine Chapter Law (Chinese: 九章律; pinyin: Jiǔzhāng Lǜ) is the most important law in the Han dynasty and had great influence on the laws in the Chinese history.

The authorship of the law is most commonly attributed to Xiao He. The Book of Han noted that after the Han dynasty was established in 206 BC, emperor Liu Bang thought the wartime three treaty laws are inadequate for the crimes, and the Book of Jin recorded that Chancellor Xiao He adapted law code from the Qin dynasty code and added three more chapters. The law got its name from the six chapters adopted from the Canon of Laws and three new chapters covering family register, conscription and livestock.

In the second year of Empress Lü Zhi's reign, the Second‐Year Law was published, and the Nine Chapter Law can no longer be used to reference the entirety of the Han dynasty legislation. The Jin dynasty (266–420) adopted the nine chapter law and added 11 more chapters, and formed its own 20 chapter legal code. In the dynasties that followed supplement laws had been announced and obsolete code removed. The nine chapter law's longevity was shown in its presence in the legal system of the Sui dynasty (589–618 CE).
