= Du River =

Coordinates: 32°46′31″N 110°37′32″E

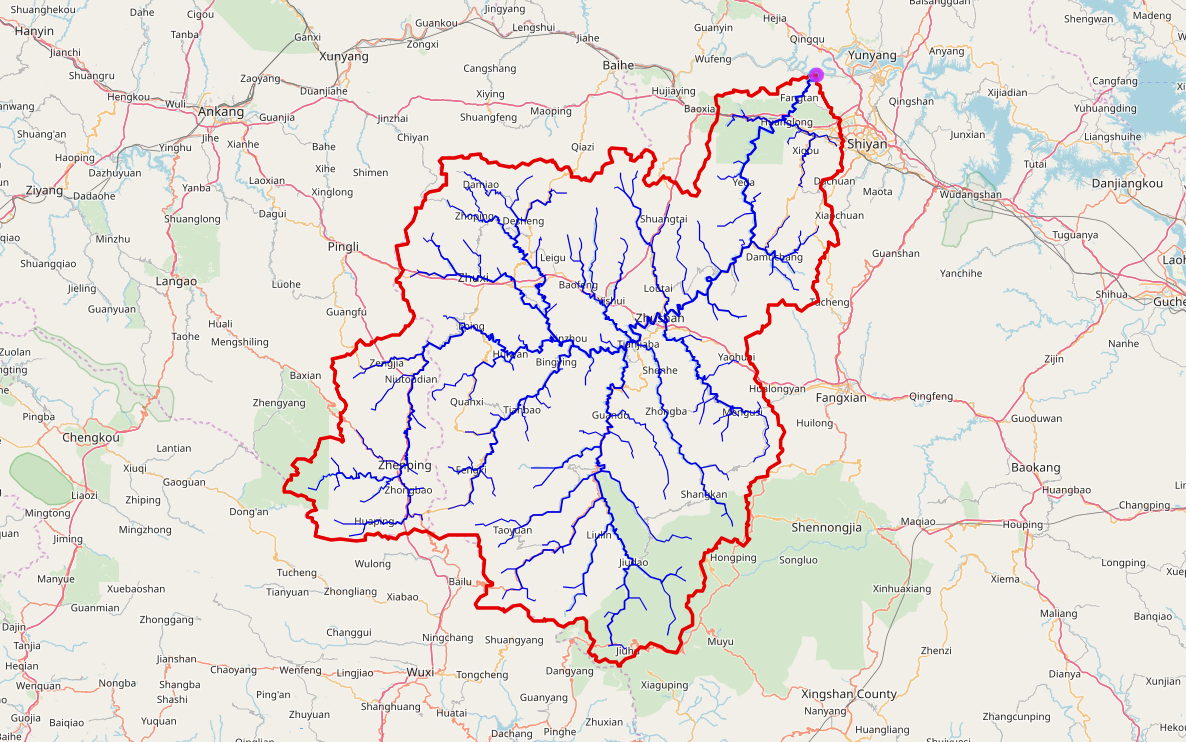

Physical characteristics
- Mouth
  - location: Han River
- Length: 330 km (210 mi)
- Basin size: 12,430 km^{2} (4,800 sq mi)

The Du is a river mainly in northwestern Hubei Province, China with sources in Shaanxi Province. It is the principal right-bank tributary of the Han River. It is interrupted by the Pankou and Huanglongtan Dams.
