= Shiyan =

Shiyan 十堰市 Shih-yen
- Prefecture-level city
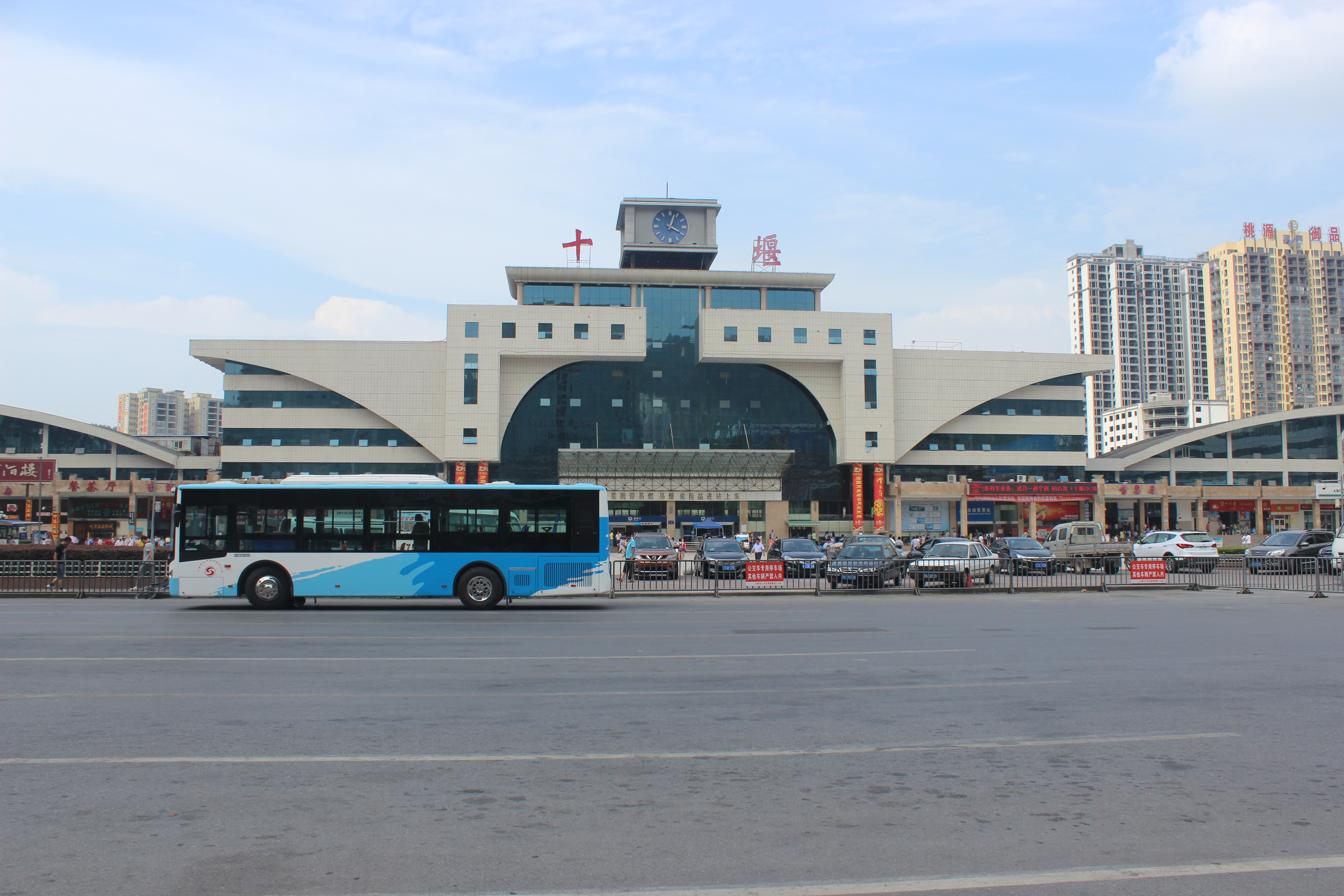
- Shiyan Railway Station in July 2014

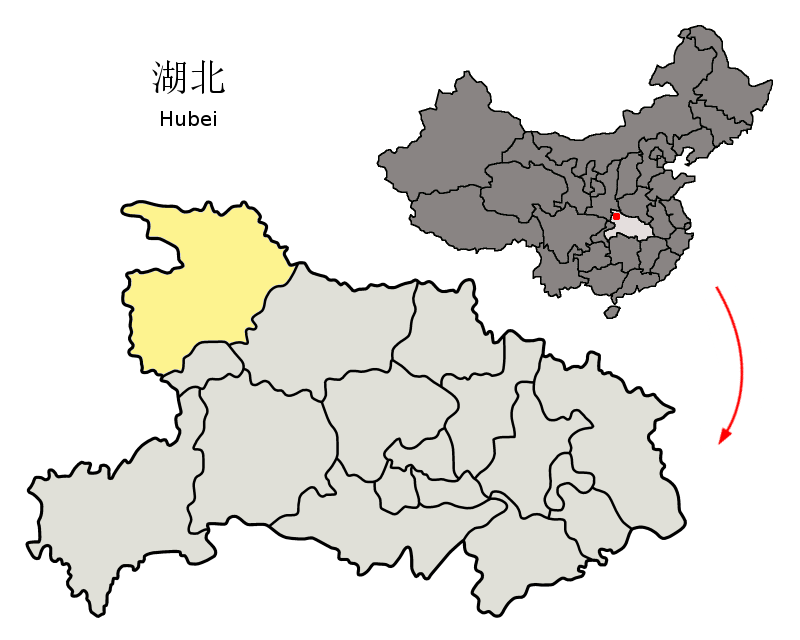
- Location of Shiyan City jurisdiction in Hubei

- Location of the city centre in Hubei
- Coordinates (Shiyan municipal government): 32°37′44″N 110°47′55″E
- Country: People's Republic of China
- Province: Hubei
- County-level divisions: 8
- Municipal seat: Maojian District

Government
  - CPC Secretary: Chen Tianhui (陈天会)
  - Mayor: Zhang Siyi (张嗣义)

Area
  - Prefecture-level city: 23,680 km^{2} (9,140 sq mi)
  - Urban (2017): 410.50 km^{2} (158.49 sq mi)
  - Metro: 11,932 km^{2} (4,607 sq mi)
- Highest elevation: 1,640 m (5,380 ft)

Population (2020 census)
  - Prefecture-level city: 3,209,004
  - Density: 135.5/km^{2} (351.0/sq mi)
  - Urban: 1,428,629
  - Urban density: 3,480.2/km^{2} (9,013.7/sq mi)
  - Metro: 1,033,407
  - Metro density: 86.608/km^{2} (224.31/sq mi)

GDP
  - Prefecture-level city: CN¥ 130.0 billion US$ 20.9 billion
  - Per capita: CN¥ 38,490; US$ 6,180
- Time zone: UTC+8 (China Standard)
- Postal code: 442000 (Urban center) 442100-442300, 442500-442700 (Other areas)
- Area code: 719
- ISO 3166 code: CN-HB-03
- License Plate: 鄂C
- City tree Camphor laurel Cinnamomum camphora L. Sieb. Southern magnolia Magnolia grandiflora L. City flower Blossom of pomegranate Punica granatum L. Chinese rose Rosa chinensis

Shiyan (Chinese: 十堰; pinyin: Shíyàn) is a prefecture-level city in northwestern Hubei, China, bordering Henan to the northeast, Chongqing to the southwest, and Shaanxi to the north and west. At the 2020 census, its population was 3,209,004 of whom 1,033,407 lived in the built-up (or metro) area made up of 2 urban districts of Maojian and Zhangwan on 1,193 square kilometres (461 square miles) as Yunyang is not conurbated. In 2007, the city was named among China's top ten livable cities by Chinese Cities Brand Value Report, which was released at 2007 Beijing Summit of China Cities Forum.

== History ==
Shiyan was first mentioned by its current name in 1484. After the establishment of the PRC, Shiyan was part of Yun County (nowadays Yunyang District).

From the 1930s through the 1950s, Shiyan was heavily impacted by frequent flooding along the Han River. In response to these floods, the government established the Danjiangkou Water Conservancy Project in 1958, a project to prevent flooding along the Han River, supply water for irrigation, and generate hydroelectricity on the river. As part of the project, the Danjiangkou Dam was built from 1958 to 1974, creating the Danjiangkou Reservoir. As part of this project, the central government had to relocate 382,000 people during the construction period.

Shiyan was developed as part of the Third Front construction. During the 1960s, Mao Zedong and other government officials, fearing upheaval and invasion, sought to establish industry in more remote locations. Shiyan, located in a portion of northwest Hubei then known for its poverty, was then a small village comprising a few hundred households. In 1967, teams of workers and engineers were first sent to Shiyan to survey sites for automotive plants and factories (Second Automobile Works, predecessor of Dongfeng Motor Corporation). In 1969, Shiyan City was established. By order of Mao in 1969, truck production in Shiyan commenced. Approximately 25,000 construction workers were sent to Shiyan during this time to equip the city with the infrastructure necessary for such a project.

In subsequent decades, the city experienced great economic growth due to these facilities, which employed nearly 200,000 workers. At one point Shiyan had the second-highest living standard in China, second only to Shenzhen, thanks to the success of Dongfeng trucks. From the 1980s to the 1990s, Shiyan saw many small enterprises founded by former employees of the Second Automobile Works emerged.

By the early 1990s, Shiyan was increasingly bypassed for new automotive ventures, which were generally located in larger cities with better transport links, although it remained the most prosperous city of Hubei. In 2003, Dongfeng Motors relocated its main passenger car plant to Wuhan, resulting in population decline within Shiyan.

In 2008, work on local portions of the South to North Water Transfer Project, the largest water transfer project in world history, began. The project's Middle Route heightened the Danjiangkou Dam and enlarged the Danjiangkou Reservoir to increase water supplies to northern Chinese cities, such as Beijing and Tianjin. A new canal in the area to transfer the water north was completed in 2014. The central government relocated 317,200 people throughout Henan and Hebei, including many in Danjiangkou, a county-level city in Shiyan, for the creation of this project.

== Geography ==
The far northern and southern reaches of Shiyan are the highest in elevation, while the geographic center of the city has a relatively low elevation. The highest point in Shiyan is Congping in Zhuxi County, at 2,740.2 metres (8,990 ft) above sea level, while the lowest point, Panjiayan in Danjiangkou, is 87 metres (285 ft) above sea level. Hills and mountains in Shiyan generally have steep inclines, and many of its rivers have steep drops and rapid water flows. Major rivers in Shiyan include the Du River and the Han River. The Wudang Mountains run east–west through Shiyan. The peak commonly referred to as "Wudang Mountain", or in Mandarin Wudangshan, is one of the most important cultural centres of the Taoist faith. The surrounding areas are dotted with up to 200 Taoist monastic temples and religious sites.

Shiyan is largely forested, and woodlands comprise 74.37% of its total area as of 2020.

Shiyan's total area is subject to major change as part of the South to North water diversion project of the Han River. Certain areas will see an increase of up to 5 metres (16 ft) in water level to create a new reservoir to serve Beijing and Tianjin as a part of this major water diversion project.

== Climate ==
Climate data for Shiyan (1991–2020 normals, extremes 1981–present)
Month	Jan	Feb	Mar	Apr	May	Jun	Jul	Aug	Sep	Oct	Nov	Dec	Year
Record high °C (°F)	22.1 (71.8)	25.0 (77.0)	34.3 (93.7)	37.8 (100.0)	39.8 (103.6)	42.1 (107.8)	41.5 (106.7)	41.2 (106.2)	40.5 (104.9)	34.7 (94.5)	29.2 (84.6)	21.6 (70.9)	42.1 (107.8)
Mean daily maximum °C (°F)	8.7 (47.7)	11.6 (52.9)	16.9 (62.4)	23.4 (74.1)	27.6 (81.7)	31.1 (88.0)	32.7 (90.9)	31.5 (88.7)	26.8 (80.2)	21.8 (71.2)	16.1 (61.0)	10.8 (51.4)	21.6 (70.9)
Daily mean °C (°F)	3.3 (37.9)	5.9 (42.6)	10.7 (51.3)	16.7 (62.1)	21.3 (70.3)	25.2 (77.4)	27.4 (81.3)	26.3 (79.3)	21.6 (70.9)	16.2 (61.2)	10.3 (50.5)	5.2 (41.4)	15.8 (60.5)
Mean daily minimum °C (°F)	−0.2 (31.6)	1.9 (35.4)	6.2 (43.2)	11.6 (52.9)	16.4 (61.5)	20.5 (68.9)	23.5 (74.3)	22.6 (72.7)	18.1 (64.6)	12.6 (54.7)	6.6 (43.9)	1.6 (34.9)	11.8 (53.2)
Record low °C (°F)	−6.9 (19.6)	−7.1 (19.2)	−3.4 (25.9)	−0.6 (30.9)	8.2 (46.8)	13.5 (56.3)	16.0 (60.8)	14.8 (58.6)	10.7 (51.3)	1.2 (34.2)	−2.9 (26.8)	−10.5 (13.1)	−10.5 (13.1)
Average precipitation mm (inches)	16.6 (0.65)	18.4 (0.72)	44.2 (1.74)	61.7 (2.43)	89.8 (3.54)	109.0 (4.29)	132.3 (5.21)	134.2 (5.28)	99.9 (3.93)	77.2 (3.04)	34.9 (1.37)	13.2 (0.52)	831.4 (32.72)
Average precipitation days (≥ 0.1 mm)	5.6	6.8	8.9	9.3	10.5	10.2	11.7	12.0	11.2	10.9	7.7	5.7	110.5
Average snowy days	5.0	3.6	1.4	0	0	0	0	0	0	0	0.9	2.5	13.4
Average relative humidity (%)	68	67	67	67	68	71	77	78	79	79	76	69	72
Mean monthly sunshine hours	142.1	133.7	173.0	199.1	204.9	207.8	218.9	204.3	156.8	151.5	144.0	141.6	2,077.7
Percentage possible sunshine	45	43	46	51	48	49	51	50	43	44	46	46	47
Source: China Meteorological Administration

== Administration ==
The prefecture-level city of Shiyan administers 8 county-level divisions, comprising three districts, one county-level city and four counties:

These eight county-level divisions then administer three different types of township-level divisions: 13 subdistricts, 72 towns, and 34 townships. Finally, these township-level divisions then administer two types of village-level divisions: 164 residential communities and 1,807 administrative villages.

Map
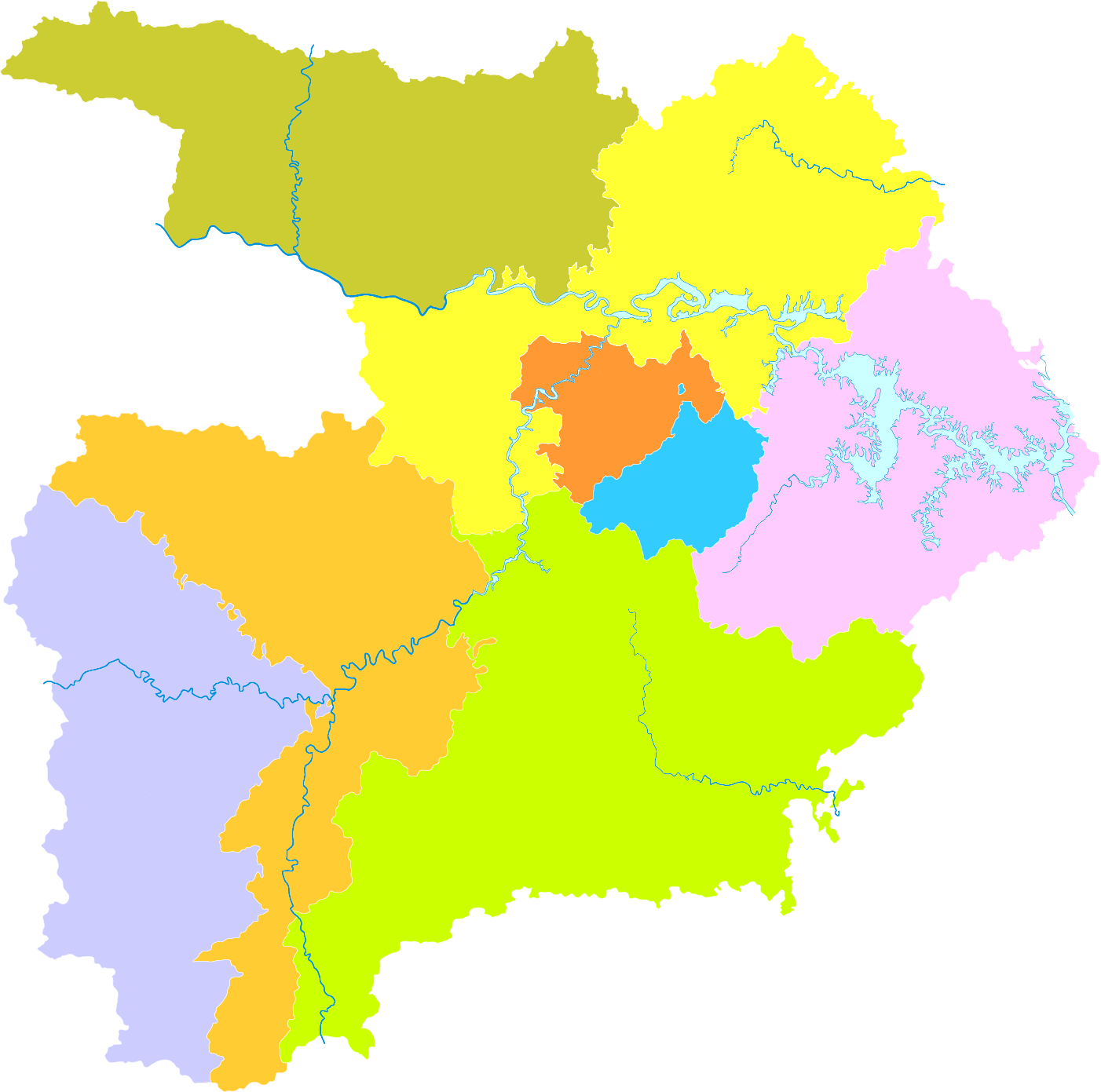

Subdivision	Simplified Chinese	Hanyu Pinyin	Population (2019)	Area (km^{2})	Density (/km^{2})
Maojian District	茅箭区	Máojiàn Qū	425,600	578	736.33
Zhangwan District	张湾区	Zhāngwān Qū	393,200	652	603.07
Yunyang District	郧阳区	Yúnyáng Qū	571,700	3,863	147.99
Danjiangkou City	丹江口市	Dānjiāngkǒu Shì	445,400	3,121	142.71
Yunxi County	郧西县	Yúnxī Xiàn	431,000	3,509.6	122.81
Zhushan County	竹山县	Zhúshān Xiàn	416,800	3,586	116.23
Zhuxi County	竹溪县	Zhúxī Xiàn	314,000	3,279	95.76
Fang County	房县	Fáng Xiàn	400,300	5,110	78.34
Note: All population totals reflect permanent population, as opposed to registered hukou population

== Demographics ==
As of 2020, Shiyan's permanent population totals approximately 3,209,000 people. Throughout 2014 to 2019, the city's registered hukou population exceeded the permanent population by a few dozen thousand. This disparity likely represents migrants who left Shiyan, working in larger cities with higher wages, a common trend throughout China. During this span, Shiyan's hukou population decreased by approximately 8,100, but the city's permanent population increased by about 25,300.

=== Vital statistics ===
In 2019, Shiyan saw a birth rate of 11.47‰ (per thousand), and a death rate of 7.02‰, giving the city a rate of natural increase of 4.45‰.

52.5% of Shiyan's population is male, and 47.5% is female as of 2019.

=== Urbanization ===
The main urban area of the prefecture-level city of Shiyan is in Maojian District, which is typically labeled on maps simply as "Shiyan". As of 2019, 56.5% of Shiyan's population lived in urban areas, up from 46.3% in 2010.

=== Income ===
In 2019, Shiyan's urban households earned an average of 33,577 renminbi (RMB) in disposable income, a 9.1% increase from 2018. Rural households earned a much lower average disposable income of 11,378 RMB, a 10.5% increase from 2018.

=== Religion ===
Shiyan's city government recognizes 19 religious organizations within the city, which represent 4 religions: Buddhism, Taoism, Islam, and Christianity. Of these organizations, the following 5 serve the entire city: the Shiyan City Buddhist Association (Chinese: 十堰市佛教协会; pinyin: Shíyàn Shì Fójiào Xiéhuì), the Shiyan City Islamic Association (Chinese: 十堰市伊斯兰教协会; pinyin: Shíyàn Shì Yīsīlánjiào Xiéhuì), the Shiyan City Protestant "Three-Self" Patriotic Movement Committee (Chinese: 十堰市基督教"三自"爱国运动委员会; pinyin: Shíyàn Shì Jīdūjiào "Sān Zì" Àiguó Yùndòng Wěiyuánhuì), the Shiyan City Protestant Association (Chinese: 十堰市基督教协会; pinyin: Shíyàn Shì Jīdūjiào Xiéhuì), and the Shiyan City Taoist Association (Chinese: 十堰市道教协会; pinyin: Shíyàn Shì Dàojiào Xiéhuì). The remaining 14 serve regions within the city.

== Economy ==
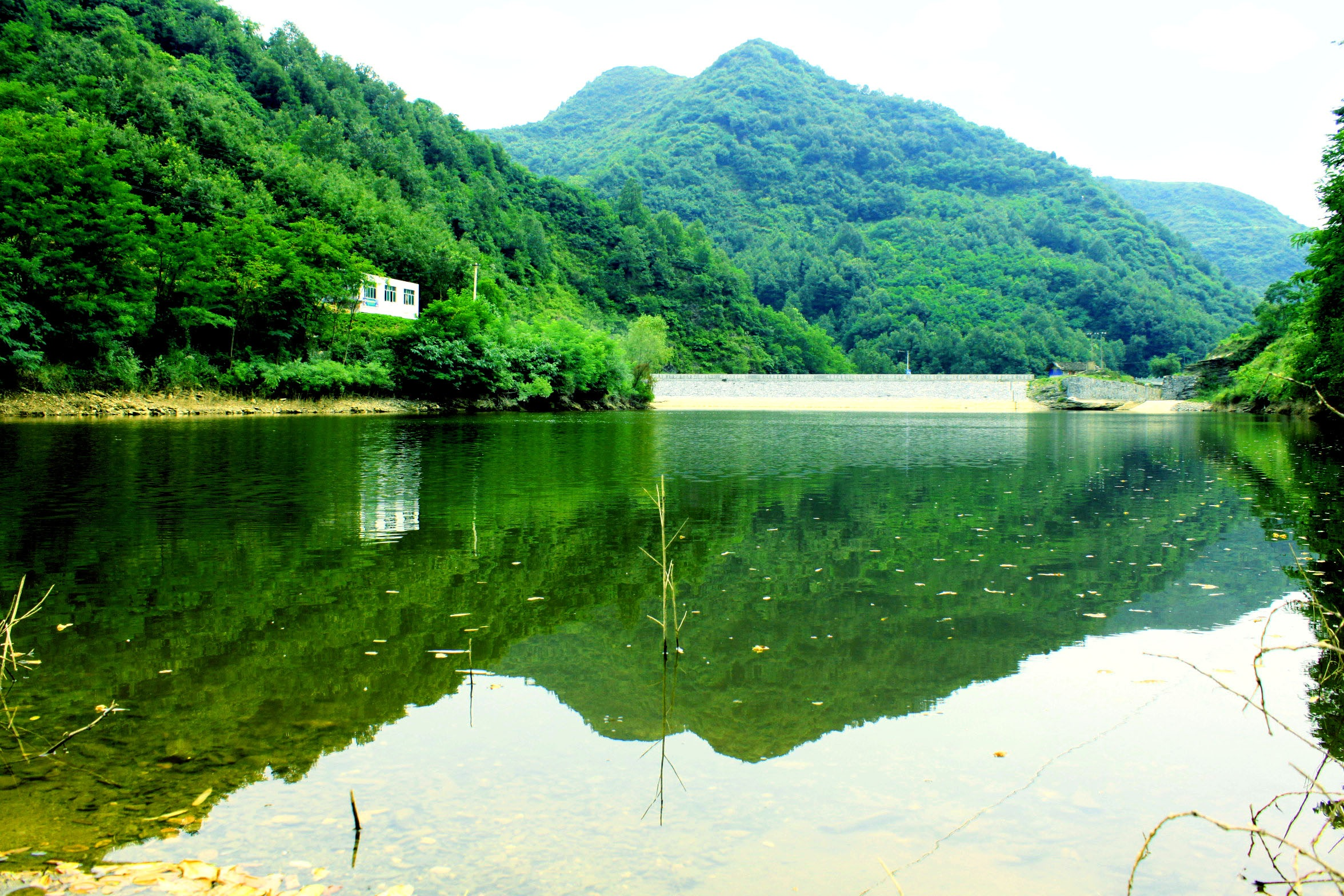
Lujiagou Reservoir, created by a dam visible in the background. The majority of Shiyan's electricity is derived from hydropower

Like China as a whole, Shiyan's economy has experienced rapid substantial growth in the 21st century. The city's gross domestic product (GDP) stood at 201.272 billion renminbi (RMB) in 2019, which is approximately two-thirds larger than the city's GDP just five years earlier. The city's economy consists almost entirely of its secondary and tertiary sectors, which constitute 43.93% and 47.55% of its GDP, respectively. However, as of 2019, 40.2% of Shiyan's population works in the primary sector, whereas just 18.0% works in the secondary sector, and 41.9% work in the tertiary sector.

The city generated 8.119 billion kWh in electricity in 2019, of which, 5.248 kWh was generated in the form of hydropower.

Major heavy industries in Shiyan include cement, which the city producing about 4.13 million tons of in 2019, and steel, which the city produced about 978 thousand tons of in 2019. The production output of both of these industries declined slightly from 2014 to 2019.

Shiyan handed 83.15 million tons of freight in 2019, the vast majority of which was transferred by road.

=== Automotive industry ===
Shiyan is a major center of the automobile industry in China since being chosen as the site of Dongfeng Motors predecessor Second Auto. In Mao's industrial plan, the Wudang mountains offered the city protection from possible enemy attacks. Starting in the 1960s, the small town grew to a major city as Dongfeng employed up to 200,000 locals and operated almost all major amenities in the city.

It previously served as the headquarters of Dongfeng Motors, a major Chinese truck, bus, and heavy goods vehicle company. Some news outlets have labeled the city as the "Detroit of China", although the nickname has been applied to other Chinese cities, such as Changchun, Chongqing, and nearby Wuhan.

In recent decades, the automotive industry in Shiyan has shrunk, largely due to increasing production in larger cities with better transit links. "Since Dongfeng relocated its main passenger car plant to Wuhan in 2003," the population of Shiyan has been decreasing. The city's production of tires, for instance, has fallen by 48.10% from 2014 to 2019. Car production in the city rose 6.67% during that time, but this number has been volatile depending on the year. In response to the threat of the industry's decline, Shiyan's government has sought to diversify the city's economy, and provide more space for other industrial facilities.

Dongfeng and its partner Renault–Nissan–Mitsubishi Alliance are nowadays producing electric vehicles in Shiyan, including the Renault KZE and Dacia Spring.

=== Tourism ===
The Wudang Mountains run east–west through Shiyan. The peak commonly referred to as "Wudang Mountain", or in Mandarin Wudangshan, is one of the most important cultural centres of the Taoist faith. The surrounding areas are dotted with up to 200 Taoist monastic temples and religious sites. The main attraction in this area, and also one of the most sacred Taoist sites, which forms an important stop for mainly Chinese tourists bound there, with up to twenty bus loads of visitors per day at peak times is Wudangshan Jiedao of the Danjiangkou county-level city.

== Culture ==
There are five magazines and seven newspapers in distribution in the city as of 2019.

99.9% of Shiyan's population lives in areas which receive radio and television coverage, and 73.4% of households in Shiyan have a cable television subscription as of 2019.

People from Shiyan traditionally speak in Henan's Nanyang dialect, however due to the large number of migrants, Standard Chinese is commonly spoken.

== Education ==
As of 2019, Shiyan's educational institutions are staffed by 29,644 full-time teachers, serving approximately 474,200 students.

The city is home to 8 public libraries, which, as of 2019, possess 1,624,090 books, and have distributed 114,622 library cards.

== Healthcare ==
Shiyan has 2,772 health institutions as of 2019, which includes 59 hospitals. These institutions host a total of 30,634 medical beds.

== Transportation ==
=== Railway ===
Shiyan is located on the Xiangyu Railway between Xiangyang and Chongqing. Construction on a railway between Shiyan and Yichang is scheduled to begin construction in 2009.

The Wuhan–Shiyan high-speed railway completed track laying in June 2019, and opened to passengers on 29 November 2019.

=== Highway ===
- G59 Hohhot–Beihai Expressway
- G70 Fuzhou–Yinchuan Expressway
- G7011 Shiyan–Tianshui Expressway
- China National Highway 209
- China National Highway 316

=== Air ===
Shiyan Wudangshan Airport (IATA: WDS, ICAO: ZHSY) is the airport serving the city of Shiyan, located 15 km (9.3 mi) from the city center and 20 km (12 mi) from Wudangshan, the World Heritage Site after which it is named. A total area of 16400 square meters; a total of one runway with a length of 2600 meters; 7 stops (2 helicopters); and an annual passenger throughput of 1.2 million passengers

Shiyan Wudangshan Airport starts to work in February 2016. Until April 2019, there are total 17 fixed routes, navigating to 26 cities.

== Sister city ==
Shiyan has been a sister city of Craiova, Romania, since December 1999.
