= Hukou =

Household registration system used in mainland China

Chinese name
- Simplified Chinese: 户口
- Traditional Chinese: 戶口
Transcriptions
Standard Mandarin
- Hanyu Pinyin: hùkǒu
- IPA: [xûkʰòʊ]
Wu
- Romanization: ji-keuh
Yue: Cantonese
- Jyutping: wu6hau2
Southern Min
- Hokkien POJ: hō͘-kháu

Alternative Chinese name
- Simplified Chinese: 户籍
- Traditional Chinese: 戶籍
Transcriptions
Standard Mandarin
- Hanyu Pinyin: hùjí
- IPA: [xûtɕǐ]
Wu
- Romanization: ji-jeh
Yue: Cantonese
- Jyutping: wu6zik6
Southern Min
- Hokkien POJ: hō͘-che̍k

Tibetan name
- Tibetan: ཐེམ་ཐོ
Transcriptions
- Wylie: them-tho

Uyghur name
- Uyghur: نوپۇس
Transcriptions
- Latin Yëziqi: nopus

Hukou (Chinese: 户口; lit. 'household individual'; IPA: [xû.kʰòʊ̯]) is a system of household registration used in mainland China. The system itself is more properly called huji (Chinese: 户籍; lit. 'household origin'; IPA: [xû.t͡ɕǐ]), and has origins in ancient China; hukou is the registration of an individual in the system. (Note: Kou literally means "mouth", which originates from the practice of regarding family members as "mouths to feed", similar to the phrase "per head" in English.) A household registration record officially identifies a person as a permanent resident of an area and includes identifying information such as name, parents, spouse and date of birth. A hukou can also refer to a family register in many contexts since the household register (simplified Chinese: 户口簿; traditional Chinese: 戶口簿; pinyin: hùkǒu bù) is issued per family, and usually includes the births, deaths, marriages, divorces, and moves of all members in the family.

The system descends in part from ancient Chinese household registration systems. The hukou system also influenced similar systems within the public administration structures of neighbouring East Asian countries, such as Japan (koseki) and Korea (hoju), as well as the Southeast Asian country Vietnam (hộ khẩu). In South Korea, the hoju system was abolished in January 2008. While unrelated in origin, propiska in the Soviet Union and resident registration in Russia had a similar purpose and served as a model for modern China's hukou system.

In the modern era, the hukou system functions as an administrative tool to address challenges of rapid urbanisation, primarily through population management and controlled migration to megacities and large urban centres. A central rationale of such policies, particularly in first-tier cities, has been to prevent severe overcrowding, infrastructure overload, and the emergence of large-scale slums during China's rapid industrialisation and urbanisation phases. Shahid Yusuf, a Senior Adviser in the World Bank’s Development Research Group, noted that the hukou system served as a "cornerstone of China's urbanisation strategy" by controlling migration and channelling migrants toward small or medium-sized cities rather than allowing unchecked inflows to the largest urban areas. He described China's ability to achieve rapid urbanisation while largely avoiding widespread slum formation as one of its "greatest successes" in managing its urbanisation pathway, stating: "One of China’s greatest successes in its rapid urbanisation has been that it has managed to contain the process to the extent that there are crowded living conditions but very few slums. This is an important achievement for a developing country."

However, there is ongoing debate regarding the future role of the system, and in recent years China has created reforms whose aim is to relax hukou restrictions gradually. In their 1990 study of Chinese peasants, anthropologists Sulamith Heins Potter and Jack M. Potter described the rural–urban status distinction as "caste-like", emphasizing inherited status and social stratification. The hukou system has been the source of much inequality over the decades since the establishment of the People's Republic of China in 1949, as urban residents received benefits that ranged from retirement pension to education to health care, while rural citizens were often left to fend for themselves. Since 1978, the central government has undertaken reforms of the system in response to protests and a changing economic system.

In 2014, the State Council called for a unified household registration system, replacing the agricultural and non-agricultural categories with resident registration.

== Nomenclature: huji vs. hukou ==
The formal name for the system is huji. Within the huji system, a hukou is the registered residency status of a particular individual in this system. However, the term hukou is used colloquially to refer to the entire system, and it has been adopted by English-language audiences to refer to both the huji system and an individual's hukou.

== Household registration in mainland China ==
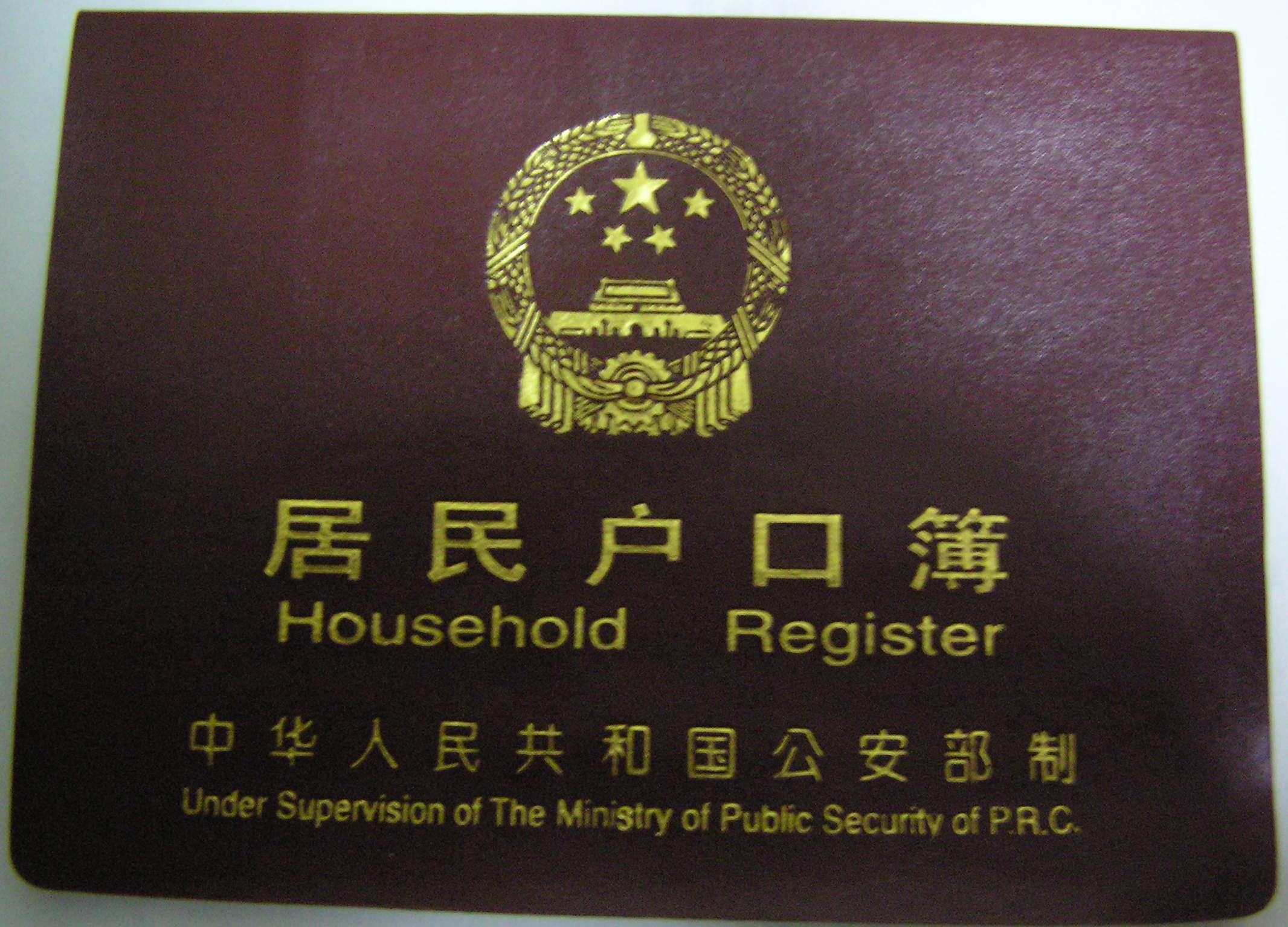
An individual household's register or hukou booklet. The local police station held a copy of these records in its central register.

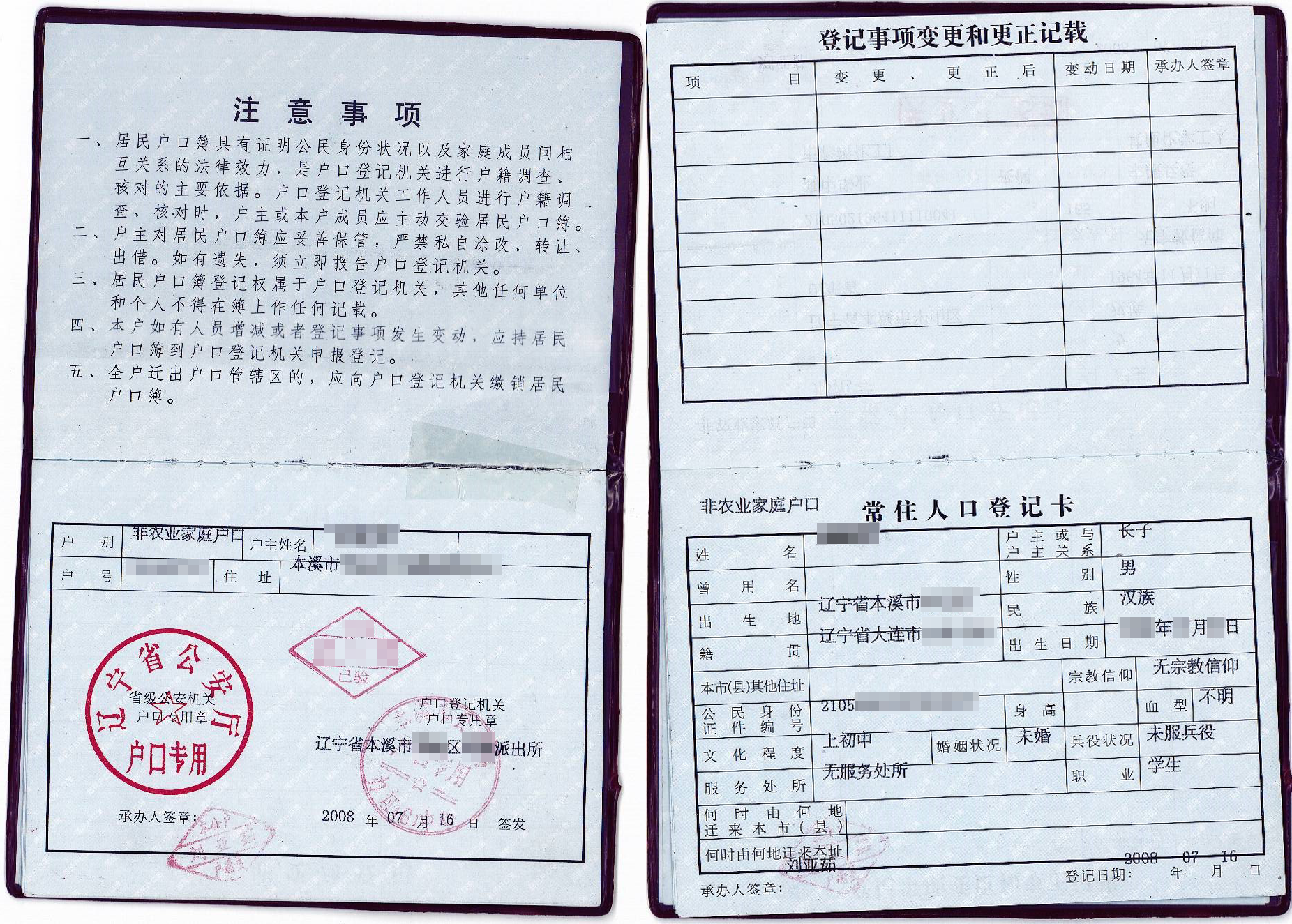
The inside pages of hukou booklet in China

The hukou system has origins in China that date back to ancient times, but the system in its current form came into being with the 1958 People's Republic of China Hukou Registration Regulation.

Historically, each citizen was classified in an agricultural or non-agricultural hukou (commonly referred to as rural or urban) and further categorised by location of origin. This two-fold organisational structure was linked to social policy, and those residents who held non-agricultural (i.e., urban) hukou status received benefits not available to their rural counterparts, and vice versa.

Internal migration was also tightly controlled by the central government, and only in the past few decades have these restrictions been loosened. While this system has played a major role in China's fast economic growth, hukou has also promoted and aggravated social stratification and contributed significantly to the deprivation of many of China's rural workers.

Steps have been taken to alleviate the inequalities promulgated by the hukou system, with major reforms announced in March and July 2014, which included a provision that eliminated the division between agricultural and non-agricultural hukou status.

=== Rationale and function ===
In the middle of the 20th century, China's weak industrial sector and food security needs meant that mass migration was a threat to stability in both urban and rural areas. By restricting peasants' ability to move, the system aimed to ensure sufficient agricultural production and to maintain social stability in urban areas with limited work opportunities. In its original legislation, the hukou system was justified as created to

"...maintain social order, protect the rights and interests of citizens and to be of service to the establishment of socialism".

The central government asserted that because rural areas had greater capacity to absorb and use excess labor, the majority of the population should be concentrated in these regions. Furthermore, free movement of people was considered dangerous, as it would lead to overpopulation of cities and could threaten agricultural production. Under the hukou system, the rural population was structured to serve as support for urban industrialisation, both in agricultural production and workers for state-owned businesses.

The hukou system served other purposes as well. After establishing the People's Republic of China in 1949, the Chinese Communist Party enacted policies based on the notions of stability and rapid modernisation, and the hukou system was no exception. Urban areas have historically been where authoritarian regimes are most vulnerable: to combat this, the central government gave preferential treatment to city residents, hoping to prevent uprisings against the state, particularly in the early years when it was especially susceptible to rebellion. The structure of the hukou system also bolstered the power of the central government over its urban citizens: by making city residents dependent upon the government for all aspects of daily life, the central government could force obedience from problematic individuals.

The central government's efforts to contain migration have been a major factor in the rapid development of the Chinese economy. Their tight check on migration into urban areas has helped prevent the emergence of several problems faced by many other developing countries. For example, the appearance of slums outside of urban areas due to a massive influx of individuals searching for work has not been an issue, nor have poor health conditions due to high population density. And regardless of its other imperfections, the hukou system's ability to maintain stability has contributed to China's economic rise.

== History ==
The legacy of the Chinese hukou system may be traced back to the pre-dynastic era, as early as the 21st century BC. In its early forms, the household registration system was used primarily for taxation and conscription, as well as regulating migration. The xiangsui and baojia systems were early models of the hukou system. The xiangsui system, established under the Western Zhou dynasty (c. 11th–8th centuries BC), was used as a method of organising and categorising urban and rural land. The function of the baojia system, propagated by Lord Shang Yang of the 4th century BC, was to create a system of accountability within groups of citizens: if one person within the group violated the strict rules in place, everyone in the group suffered. This structure was later utilized and expanded upon during the Qin dynasty (221–207 BC) for taxation, population control, and conscription.

According to the Examination of Hukou in Wenxian Tongkao published in 1317, there was a minister for population management during the Zhou dynasty named Simin (Chinese: 司民), who was responsible for recording births, deaths, emigrations and immigrations. The Rites of Zhou notes that three copies of documents were kept in different places. The administrative divisions in the Zhou dynasty were a function of the distance to the state capital. The top division nearest the capital was named Dubi (Chinese: 都鄙); top divisions in more distant areas were named Xiang (Chinese: 鄉) and Sui (Chinese: 遂). Families were organized under the Baojia system.

Guan Zhong, Prime Minister of the Qi state in the 7th century BC, imposed different taxation and conscription policies on different areas. In addition, Guan Zhong also banned immigration, emigration, and separation of families without permission. In the Book of Lord Shang, Shang Yang also described his policy restricting immigrations and emigrations.

Xiao He, the first Chancellor of the Han dynasty, added the chapter of Hu (Chinese: 户律, "Households Code") as one of the nine basic law codes of Han (Chinese: 九章律), and established the hukou system as the basis of tax revenue and conscription.

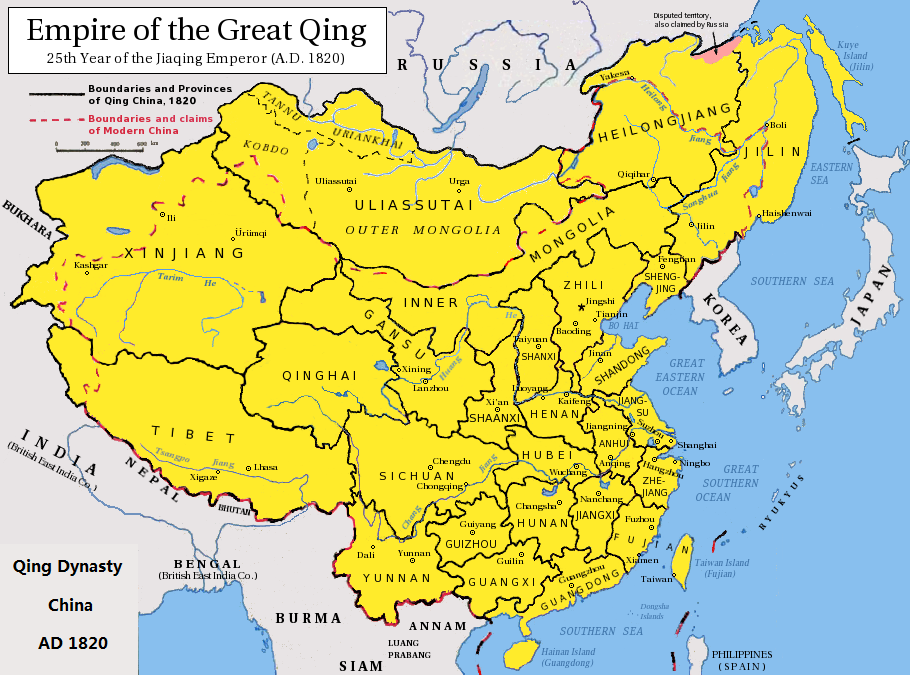
Precursors to the hukou system were used during the Qing dynasty to monitor individuals and raise funds for war.

The first formal codification of the hukou system arose at the end of the Qing dynasty (1644–1912) with the 1911 Huji Law. Although movement was nominally free under this statute, registration of individuals with the government was required, and it was used by the government to pursue communist forces and as a basis for taxation for the funding of wars. The law also expanded upon the baojia system, and was intended to establish a sense of stability.

In the period following the fall of the Qing dynasty, China was ruled by various actors, each of which employed some system of household or personal identification. During the Japanese occupation, the Japanese employed a system used to identify those under their rule and to fund their war effort. Similarly, the Kuomintang utilized the system to monitor the activities of their opponents, the Chinese Communist Party, and the Chinese Communist Party in turn used a system called lianbao, which bundled families into groups of five to aid tracking and impede counterrevolutionaries.

=== 1949–1978: Maoist era ===
At the time of its founding in 1949, the People's Republic of China was a highly agricultural nation. About 89% of its citizens lived in rural areas – about 484 million resided in the countryside, versus about 58 million in the city. However, with efforts to increase industrialisation and Soviet help (156 projects), more and more rural residents flocked to the cities in search of better economic opportunities: between 1957 and 1960, there was a 90.9% increase in the urban labour force.

A major objective of the hukou system implemented by the central government was thus to control the stream of resources moving away from the agricultural sector. According to academic Kam Wing Chan, the hukou system effectively forbade the peasantry to exit agriculture." The instability and high rates of movement that characterised the years following the establishment of the nation impeded the central government's plan for society and the economy. Although the hukou system in its current form was not officially brought into being until 1958, the years preceding its establishment were characterised by growing efforts by the Chinese Communist Party to assert control over its populace. In 1950, the Minister of Public Security, Luo Ruiqing, published a statement detailing his vision for the implementation of the hukou system in the new era. By 1954, rural and urban citizens had been registered with the state, and rigorous regulations on the conversion of hukou status had already been implemented. These required that applicants have paperwork that documented employment, acceptance to a university, or immediate family relations in the city to be eligible. In March of the same year, the Ministry of the Interior and the Ministry of Labour issued the Joint Directive to Control Blind Influx of Peasants into Cities, which proclaimed that henceforth, all employment of rural workers in city firms would be controlled entirely by local labour bureaus.

On 9 January 1958, the People's Republic of China Hukou Registration Regulation was signed into law. This divided the populace into nongmin (rural citizen), with an agricultural hukou, and shimin (urban citizen), with a non-agricultural hukou, and grouped all citizens by locality. The key difference, however, lay in the distinction between agricultural and non-agricultural hukou status. Because the central government prioritized industrialization, state welfare programs, which were tied to hukou status, heavily favored urban residents; holders of agricultural hukous were unable to access these benefits and were saddled with inferior welfare policies. Furthermore, transfer of hukou status was highly restricted, with official quotas at 0.15-0.2% per year and actual conversion rates at about 1.5%. In the following years, government oversight over the movement of people was expanded. In 1964, greater limits were imposed on migration to big cities, particularly major ones like Beijing and Shanghai, and in 1977 these regulations were furthered. Throughout this era, the hukou system was used as an instrument of the command economy, helping the central government implement its plan for industrialising the nation.

=== 1978–present: Post-Mao ===
From the establishment of the People's Republic of China until Chairman Mao died in 1976, the central government tightened its control over migration, and by 1978, intranational movement was controlled entirely by the government. Because living "outside the system" was virtually impossible, nearly all movement of people was state-sponsored.

However, with Deng Xiaoping's rise to power in 1978 came the initiation of reforms that steadily began to alleviate some of the disparity between agricultural and non-agricultural hukou holders. Restrictions have been loosened on movement from rural areas to smaller cities, although migration to large cities such as Beijing and Tianjin is still heavily regulated. Greater autonomy has also been ceded to local governments in deciding quotas and eligibility criteria for converting hukou status. Legislation has been enacted that allow migrant workers to obtain temporary residency permits, although these permits do not allow them access to the same benefits as possessed by urban residents. However, with living outside the system now much more practical than it used to be, some migrant workers do not acquire the temporary residency permits – primarily because they do not have the resources or concrete employment offers to do so – and, as such, live in danger of being forced to return to the countryside.

In 2014, the central government announced reform that among other things eliminated the division between agricultural and non-agricultural hukou status. Although some large cities have enacted unification, the process has been slow and according to various local policies.

The 2014-2020 National New-Type Urbanization Plan sought to attribute an urban hukou to 100 million people by 2020. It relaxed restrictions on small cities (fewer than 500,000 people) and medium cities (more than 1 million people). It maintained strong hukou restrictions on cities of more than 5 million inhabitants.

China established a digital social security card, which had been issued to 715 million citizens by the end of 2022. For migrant workers, the digital social security card facilitates their access to benefits and avoids the need to return to their place of household registration to access their benefits.

== Effect on rural population ==
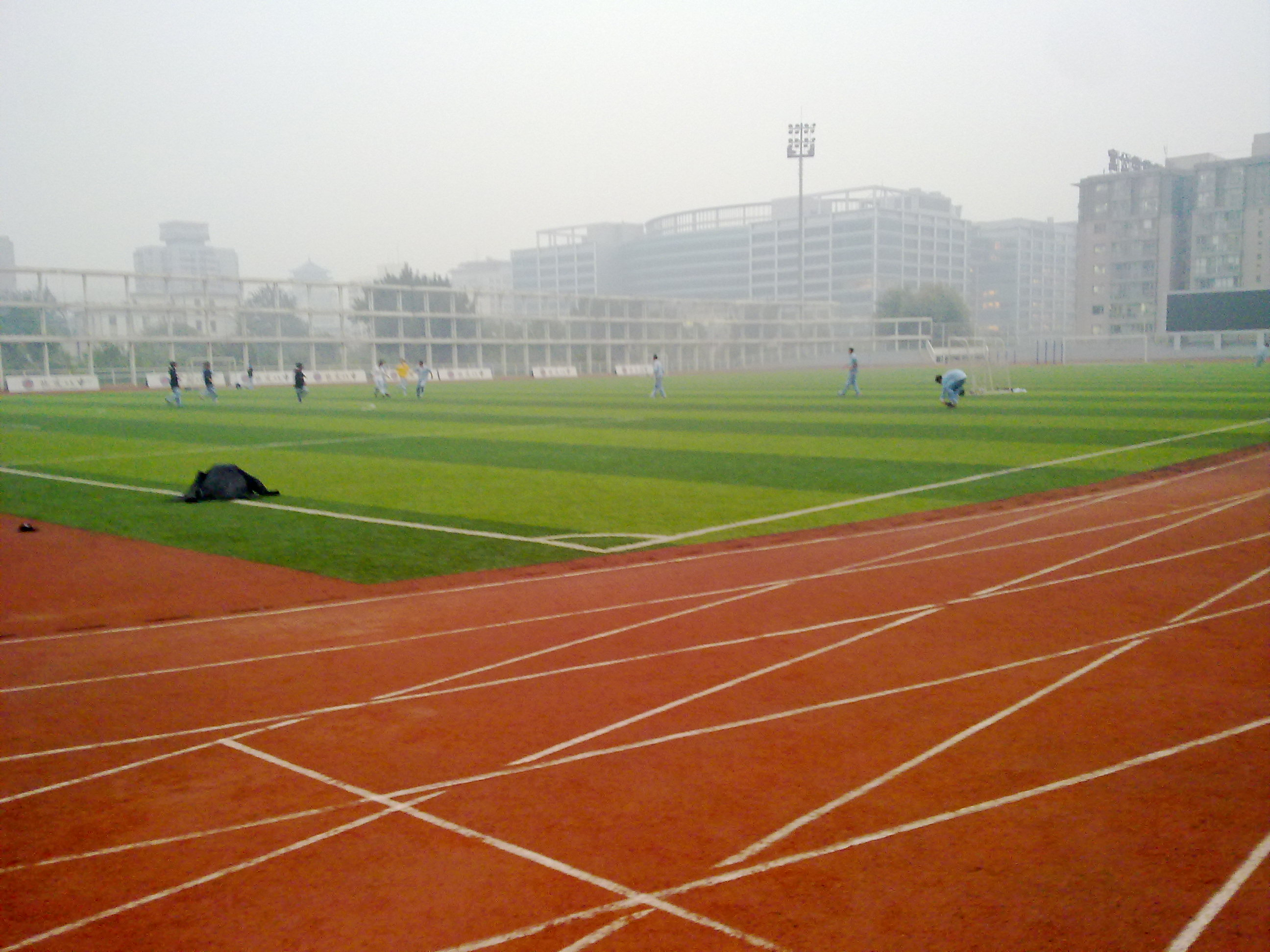
Sports field of a high school in Beijing.

Under the hukou system implemented by the central government in 1958, while holders of the non-agricultural hukou status were given ration cards for everyday necessities, including food and textiles, rural residents were forced to produce everything themselves. Whereas the state provided housing in the city, rural individuals had to construct their own homes. The state invested in education, arranged employment, and provided retirement benefits for city residents, and provided none of these services for their rural citizens. These disparities have left the rural populace highly disadvantaged, and events such as the famine of the Great Leap Forward primarily affected rural Chinese citizens.

=== Surviving the famine ===
During the Great Chinese Famine from 1958 to 1962, having an urban versus a rural hukou could mean the difference between life and death. During this period, nearly all of the approximately 600 million rural hukou residents were collectivised into village communal farms, where their agricultural output—after state taxes—would be their only source of food. With institutionalised exaggeration of output figures by local Communist leaders and massive declines in production, state taxes during those years confiscated nearly all food in many rural communes, leading to mass starvation and the deaths of approximately 30 million Chinese people.

The 100 million urban hukou residents, however, were fed by fixed food rations established by the central government, which declined to an average of 1500 calories per day at times but still allowed survival for almost all during the famine. An estimated 95% or higher of all deaths occurred among rural hukou holders. With the suppression of news internally, many city residents were not aware that mass deaths were occurring in the countryside at all. This was essential to preventing organised opposition to Mao's policies.

=== Post–1978 ===
During China's transition from state socialism to market socialism (1978–2001), migrants, most of whom were women, worked in newly created export-processing zones in city suburbs under sub-standard working conditions. There were restrictions upon the mobility of migrant workers that forced them to live precarious lives in company dormitories or shanty towns where they were exposed to abusive treatment.

The impact of the hukou system upon migrant labourers became onerous in the 1980s after hundreds of millions were ejected from state corporations and cooperatives. Since the 1980s, an estimated 200 million Chinese live outside their officially registered areas and under far less eligibility for education and government services, living therefore in a condition similar in many ways to that of illegal immigrants. The millions of peasants who have left their land remain trapped at the margins of the urban society. They are often blamed for rising crime and unemployment, and, under pressure from their citizens, the city governments have imposed discriminatory rules. For example, the children of farm workers (Chinese: 农民工; pinyin: nóngmín gōng) can face restrictions on enrollment in city schools, and some live with their grandparents or other relatives to attend school in their hometowns. They are commonly referred to as the "stay-at-home" or "left-behind" children. There are around 130 million such left-behind children, living without their parents, as reported by Chinese researchers.

As rural workers provide their workforce in the urban areas, which also profit from the respective taxes, while their families use public services in the rural areas (e.g. schools for their children, health care for the elderly), the system leads to a wealth transfer to the wealthier urban regions from the poorer regions on the public sector level. Intra-family payments from the working-age members to their relatives in the rural areas counteract that to some extent.

=== Migrant workers in cities ===
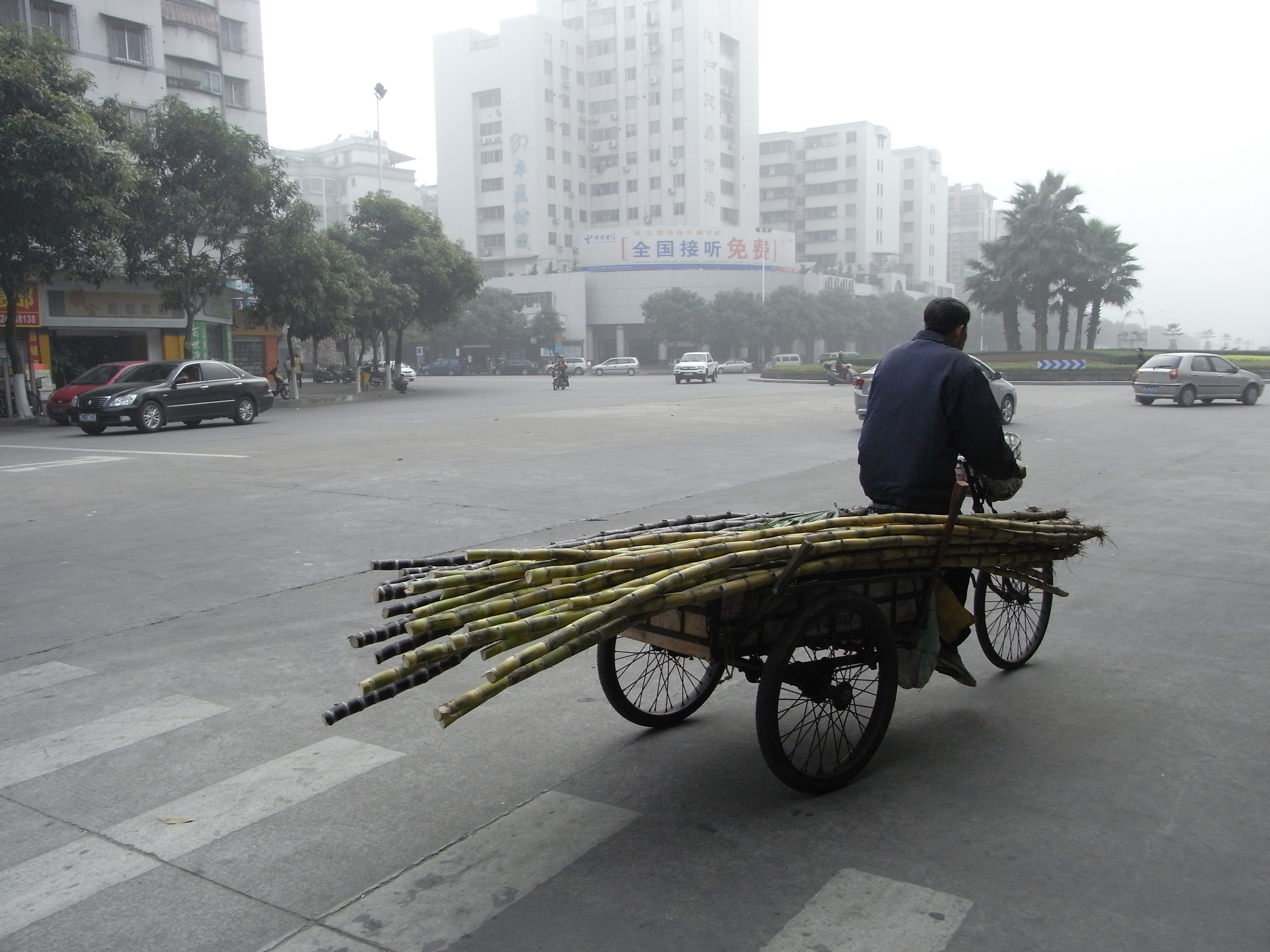
Many rural migrants find work as laborers in cities.

With the loosening of restrictions on migration in the 1980s came a large influx of rural residents seeking better opportunities in the cities. However, these migrant workers have had to confront several challenges in their pursuit of financial security. Urban residents received priority over migrants when it came to employment opportunities, and when migrant workers did find jobs, they tended to be positions with little potential for growth. While urban workers were supported by employment benefits and laws that favoured them over their employers in case of disputes, rural hukou holders were not privy to such substantial protections. And because city officials' performance was evaluated based on the prosperity of residents and the local economy, they had little incentive to improve the migrant workers' quality of life.

In 2008, the central government passed the Labour Contract Law, which guaranteed equal access to jobs, established a minimum wage, and required employers to provide contracts to full-time employees that included employment benefits. However, a 2010 study revealed that rural workers earned 40% less than urban workers, and only 16% received employment benefits. Migrant workers' labour rights are also frequently violated – they work excessively long hours in poor conditions, and face physical and psychological harassment.

Migrant workers are also disproportionately affected by wage arrears, which occur when employers either fail to pay employees on time or in full. Although such incidences are technically illegal and punishable by seven years' jail time, wage arrears still occur, and labour contracts and pensions may be disregarded. In a study conducted at the end of the 1990s, 46% of migrant workers were missing three or more months of pay, and some workers had not been paid in a decade. Fortunately, over the past couple of decades, the prevalence of wage arrears has decreased, and in a study conducted from 2006 to 2009, it was found that 8% of migrant workers had experienced wage arrears.

=== Children of migrant workers ===
Following Mao's death in 1976 came economic reforms that caused a surge in demand in the labour market. Rural residents rushed to fill this void, but without the support of hukou status-based government social programs, many of them were forced to leave their families behind. Economic growth throughout the years has maintained a high demand for labour in the cities that continues to be filled by migrant workers, and, in 2000, the Fifth National Population Census revealed that 22.9 million children between the ages of 0-14 were living without either one or both of their parents. In 2010, that number had gone up to 61 million, equal to 37.7% of rural children and 21.88% of all Chinese children. These children are usually cared for by their remaining parent and/or their grandparents, and although there is a 96% school enrolment rate among left-behind children, they are susceptible to several developmental challenges. Left-behind children are more likely to resist authority and experience problems interacting with their peers; they are more likely to start smoking, and have an increased likelihood of developing mental health issues, including loneliness and depression. And although left-behind children may have greater academic opportunities due to their parents' expanded financial capacity, they are also often under greater pressure to perform academically and thus are more vulnerable to school-related stress.

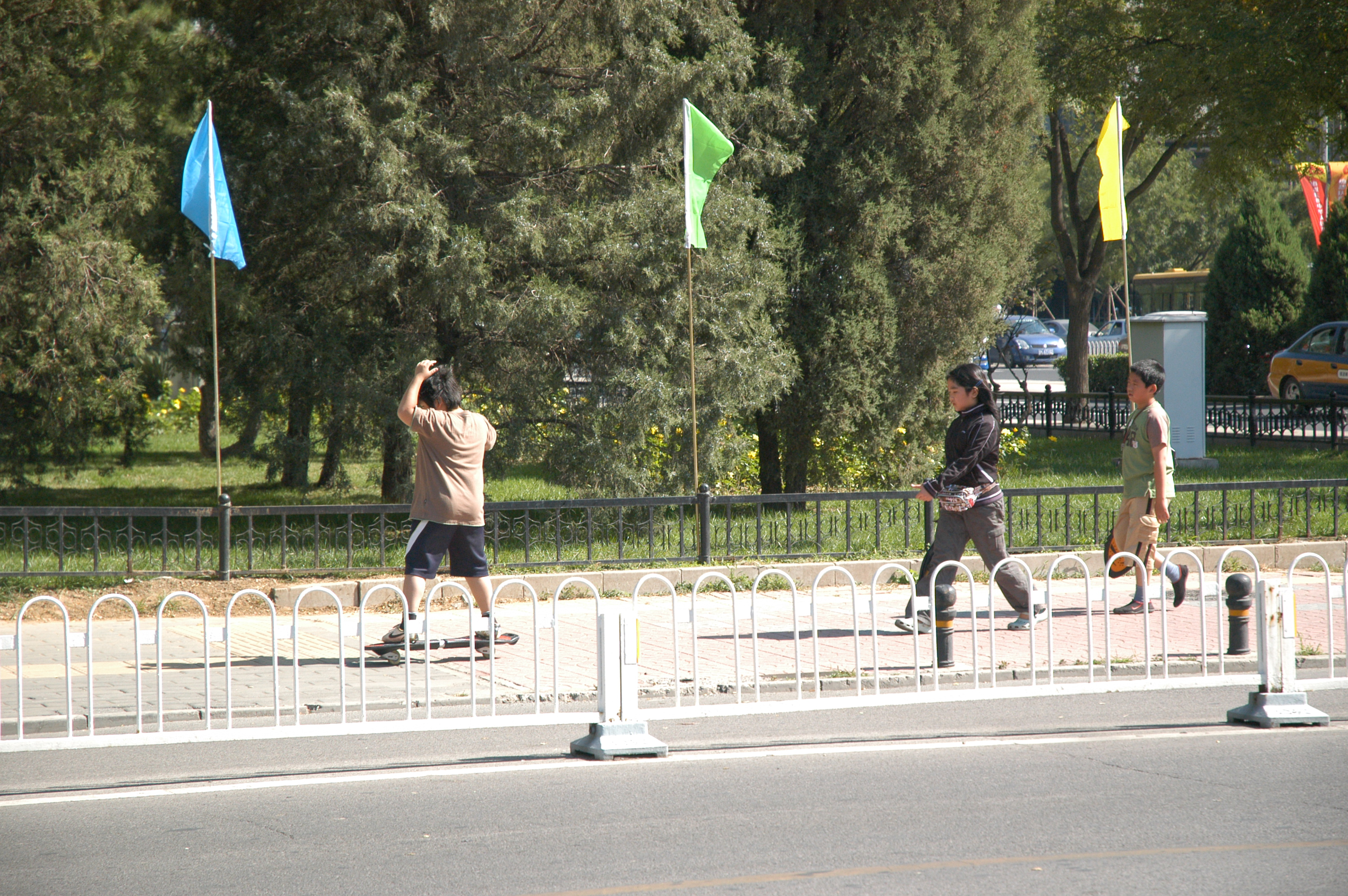
Children who migrate with their parents face difficulties not experienced by their local counterparts.

Children of rural workers who do migrate with their parents also face challenges. Without a local, non-agricultural hukou, migrant children have limited access to public social infrastructure. For example, urban students' educational opportunities are far superior to those of their migrant student counterparts. The central government reformed the education system in 1986 and then again in 1993, yielding greater autonomy to local governments in the regulation of their education system. Limited space and the desire to protect local interests in turn induced local governments to avoid enrolling migrant children in their public schools. Furthermore, because the central government subsidised public schools based on enrolment rates of children with local hukous, migrant children were required to pay higher fees if they wanted to attend. Consequently, many migrant families elect instead to send their children to private schools that specifically cater to migrants. However, to lower enrolment and attendance fees, these institutions must cut spending in other areas, resulting in a lower quality of education. School facilities are often in poor condition, and many teachers are unqualified.

In subsequent years, the central government has enacted several reforms, with limited impact. In 2001, it asserted that public schools should be the primary form of education for the nation's children, but did not specify how it would financially support schools in enrolling more migrant children, resulting in little change. Similarly, in 2003, the government called for lower fees for migrant children, but again failed to detail how it would help schools pay for this. And in 2006, the government created the New Compulsory Education Act, which asserted equal rights to education and ceded responsibility for enrolling migrant children to provincial governments. However, this too failed to improve the lot of migrant children. Students with non-local hukou had to pay inflated admission fees of 3,000 – 5,000 yuan – out of an average annual household income of 10,000 yuan – and were required to take The National College Entrance Examination (Gaokao) at their hukou locality, where it is often harder to get into college. Since 2012, some regions began to relax the requirements and allow some children of migrants to take the College Entrance Exam in the regions. By 2016, Guangdong's policies were the most relaxed. A child of migrants can take the Entrance Exam in Guangdong if he or she has attended 3 years of high school in the province, and if the parent(s) have legal jobs and have paid for 3 years of social insurance in the province.

The difficulties faced by migrant children cause many to drop out, and this is particularly common in the middle school years: in 2010, only 30% of migrant children were enrolled in secondary education. Migrant children also disproportionately deal with mental health issues – 36% versus 22% among their local hukou counterparts – and 70% experience academic anxiety. They frequently face stigmatisation and discrimination based on differences in how they dress and speak, and have difficulty interacting with other students.

=== Impact on rural elderly ===
Not only has the mass exodus of rural residents from the countryside in search of work impacted the children of migrant workers, but it has also affected the elderly left behind. With the institution of the one-child policy in the 1970s, the average age in China has undergone an upward shift: 82% of migrant workers were between the ages of 15–44 in 2000. This has called into question the traditional custom of filial piety, and while retired urban workers are supported by government retirement programs, rural workers must rely on themselves and their families. It appears that the effects of migration on left-behind elderly are ambiguous: while parents of migrant children are often better off financially and are happy with their economic situation, they also tend to report lower life satisfaction than do elderly without migrant children. Like the children of migrant workers, parents are known to experience psychological issues such as depression and loneliness, and those who take care of their grandchildren may feel burdened by this responsibility.

=== Reform ===
Since the commencement of the reform and opening up period in 1978, the People's Republic of China has taken steps toward reforming the hukou system by implementing a variety of reform policies. 1979-1991 can be identified as the first reform period. Specifically, in October 1984, the state issued "A Document on the Issue of Peasants Settling Down in Cities", which required local governments to integrate rural migrants as part of their urban population and to enable rural migrants to register in their migrant cities. In 1985, the state also implemented a policy called "Interim Provisions on the Management of Transient Population in Cities", which allowed rural migrants to stay in their migrant cities even if they had neither changed their hukou status nor returned to their original rural residency. In the same year, the state also published a document called "The Regulations on Resident Identity Card", which enabled rural migrants to work in cities even if they did not carry an identity card of urban status. However, what followed these policies was not only a 30 million rural-to-urban migration, but also a phenomenon in which many false urban identity cards were sold to rural migrants for gaining urban benefits. It hence stimulated the state to implement another policy, "A Notice on Strictly Controlling Excessive Growth of 'Urbanization,'" in 1989 for regulating rural-to-urban migration. Under this policy, rural migrants were monitored again.

1992–2013 can be identified as the second hukou reform period. There were various kinds of reform implemented by the state. Beginning in the late 1980s, one was to offer a "lan yin", or "blue stamp", hukou to those who possessed professional skills and/or ability to make some sort of investments (at least 100 million Renminbi yuan) in specific cities (usually the big cities such as Shanghai), allowing them to live in cities and enjoy urban welfare entitlements. This "blue stamp hukou" was then conducted by many other big cities (including Nanjing, Tianjin, Guangzhou, and Shenzhen) in 1999. The second kind was not applied to big cities but to certain selected towns and small cities. In 1997, the state implemented a policy that granted urban hukou to the rural migrants who had a stable job in their newly resided towns and small cities. Meanwhile, according to two 1997 government documents, the "Pilot Scheme for Reform of the Hukou System in Small Towns" and "Instructions on Improving the Management of Rural Hukou System", rural migrant workers could register as permanent residents with equal access to urban privileges in certain small towns. These policies were then made official in 2012 with the state document "Notice on Actively Yet Prudently Pushing Forward the Reform of Hukou System Management." Moreover, in 1999, the state also allowed more groups of people to gain urban hukou, including children whose parent(s) had urban hukou, and the elderly whose child(ren) had been granted urban hukou. The third kind was applied to the special economic zones and districts that were established particularly for economic growth (such as Shenzhen). Specifically, in 1992, the state allowed all people living in the special economic zones and districts to carry two hukous: Their original hukou and another hukou related to their job in the special zones and districts. This policy hence made it easier for rural migrants to gain access to different urban opportunities in the special zones and districts. However, in 2003, the state published the "Administrative Permit Laws", which sent rural migrants back to their original residency in rural areas. Under this policy, rural migrants' life chances were once again determined by their hukou status.

The third reform period began in 2014, when the state published and implemented the National New-Type Urbanization Plan (2014–2020) in March to tackle various problems derived from China's fast urbanization process. For instance, the plan aims to shorten the 17.3% gap between urban residents who live in cities but do not carry urban hukou and urban residents with urban hukou in 2012 by 2% by 2020. Meanwhile, the plan also intends to offer welfare entitlements to people who have rural hukou (from rural migrants to urban residents who carry rural hukou), including education, welfare housing, and health care to at least 90% (about 100 million) of migrants by 2020. In fact, with this plan, the state has been putting effort into achieving their goals. For instance, the state has granted many left-behind children the right to attend urban schools so that they can reunite with their rural migrant parents; it has also offered many rural migrants job training. Moreover, in July of the same year, the government also published "Opinions on Further Promoting the Reform of the Hukou System" to abolish the hukou restrictions in towns and small cities, to gradually remove the restrictions in middle-sized cities, to relax the restrictions in big cities—but to maintain the restrictions in the very large cities. As a result, according to an announcement of the Ministry of Public Security, by 2016, the state had already issued urban hukou to about 28.9 million rural migrants. Furthermore, in 2016, the local government of Beijing announced that they would abolish the official distinction between urban hukou and non-urban hukou within Beijing, meaning that all residents living in Beijing would be identified as Beijing residents regardless of their original hukou status. Having said that, in November 2017, the government of Beijing implemented a 40-day "clean-up" campaign which was claimed as a way of getting rid of the unsafe structures and shantytowns in the city (where at least 8.2 million rural migrants lived). However, some saw the campaign as intended to send millions of rural migrants back to their original rural areas.

It has been brought into question whether the reforms mentioned above apply to the majority of rural-to-urban migrants. Specifically, many reform policies, especially those during the first and second periods, appear to require rural migrants to possess some sort of capital, either human capital (such as professional skills and titles) or property-related capital (such as the ability to become an urban homeowner) or both. Some scholars hence also call some reform policies as ways of "selling" hukou. Meanwhile, many migrants have claimed that their lack of social networks (part of what is called "guan xi")—which in some sense is also accumulated with wealth—also has made it harder for them to find a stable job, let alone a lucrative job. Hence, if wealth is a precondition to change from rural hukou to urban hukou, many rural migrants indeed are unable to gain that access, as many are "unskilled" (because many skills, such as farming, are not categorised as professional skills) and poor. However, in some large cities, even if a rural migrant does carry certain professional skills, it is not a guarantee that one will be granted urban hukou. This situation is particularly revealed from many highly educated migrants. Despite their educational background, many would not be granted urban hukou unless they become homeowners. However, given the high price of real estate in many large cities (such as Beijing, Shanghai, Guangzhou), many are unable to do so even if some cities do offer housing subsidies to migrants. Given their lack of urban hukou, many not only face the difficulty of purchasing an apartment—let alone purchasing a house—but also the disadvantage of being a renter. Because of the lack of rent control in many large cities, even if one rents a room—or rarely, an apartment—one can face the possibility of being asked to leave. Many of those educated migrant youths hence are also called "yi zu", literally "a group of ants", as many do not have their own room and have to live in a tiny room with many others.

Many large cities are still strict about granting rural migrants with urban hukou and about using the hukou system to determine whether or not one should be granted welfare entitlements. Even if the "National New-type Urbanisation Plan (2014-2020)" and the "Opinions on Further Promoting the Reform of the Hukou System" implemented in the third reform period intend to create a more people-centred system, they claim that larger cities should have different hukou registration systems from the smaller cities and towns; and that the hukou regulation will continue to be stricter in larger cities. However, the very large cities (such as Beijing) are usually the ones that attract rural migrants the most, given their extensive job opportunities. In this case, although the state has actively implemented many reform policies, the hukou rural/urban division still functions and represents a division system of life chances. In 2008, Kam Wing Chan and Will Buckingham argued that the hukou reforms up to that point had not fundamentally changed the hukou system but had only decentralized the powers of hukou to local governments, and that it remained active and continued to contribute to China's rural and urban disparity. Meanwhile, others have also argued that by concentrating on cities, the hukou reforms have failed to target the poorer regions, where social welfare such as education and medical care are often not offered to the residents. Still, others seem excited, remarking that some cities have been offering a condition that encourages more migrant parents to bring their children along. In short, the majority of rural migrants thus are still largely overlooked due to their lack to urban hukou, which is often seen as starting point for gaining access to life well-being.

In July 2024, the State Council's five-year urbanization action plan called for implementing the removal of settlement restrictions in cities with urban resident populations below 3 million, relaxing requirements in cities of 3–5 million, and improving points-based settlement in larger cities.

In May 2026, further reforms were announced by the State Council, which stated that hukou holders can enroll in social insurance programmes in the cities where they are employed regardless of where their hukou is registered. The State Council guidelines also call on the local governments to help more migrant children to attend public schools while letting those eligible to take entrance exams in the places they reside. They additionally call for expanded access to rental housing programmes, coverage of those without local hukou with stable employment, participation of employees in social insurance programs in their workplaces, as well as easing of hukou restrictions in child care, elderly care and disability support. Additionally, the guidelines call on province-level local governments to boost fiscal support for public services in areas with population inflows.

=== Hukou conversion today ===
The Floating Population Dynamic Monitoring Surveys, which have been conducted every year since 2010 by the National Health and Family Planning Commission, have reported that a significant number of migrant workers are in fact not interested in converting their hukou status. While hukou policy reform has been gradual over the years, barriers to conversion have been lowered. However, many rural residents are hesitant to give up their agricultural hukou status. As rural hukou holders, they have property rights not afforded to their urban counterparts, which allow them to use land both for agricultural production and for personal use. And with the steady expansion of cities, property values of land near cities have significantly increased. Owners of these tracts of land may elect to give up agriculture in favour of renting out their homes to migrant workers. Furthermore, with the continued process of urbanization, land owners near cities can expect the central government to buy their land for a handsome sum sometime in the future. These benefits combined with the overall improvement in rural social welfare relative to that in cities have caused many rural residents to hesitate in converting their hukou status.

== Special administrative regions of China ==
Hukou is not employed in the special administrative regions of China (Hong Kong and Macau) though identification cards are mandatory for residents there. Instead, both SARs grant right of abode to certain persons who are allowed to reside permanently in the regions.

When a person with household registration in mainland China is settling in Hong Kong or Macau by means of a One-way Permit, they must relinquish their household registration, therefore losing citizen rights in mainland China. However, they need to settle in the SARs for seven years to be eligible for permanent resident status (which is associated with citizen rights) in the SARs. Therefore, in the period before they get permanent resident status, though still a Chinese citizen, they cannot exercise citizen rights anywhere (like voting in elections, getting a passport) and are considered second-class citizens.

== Cross-strait relations ==
The People's Republic of China (Mainland China) and the Republic of China (Taiwan) each claim the territories under the other's control as part of their respective state. Thus, legally, each treats the people on the other side's territory as their citizens. However, citizenship rights are only available to the people under their own control respectively; this is defined by law as holding household registration in Taiwan Area (in the Republic of China) or in Mainland Area (in the People's Republic of China).

The Government of the Republic of China (ROC) considers ethnic overseas Chinese and Taiwanese born to at least one ROC parent as its nationals, and issues Taiwan passports to them. However, this does not grant them the right of abode or any other citizen rights in Taiwan; those rights require household registration in Taiwan. Persons without household registration are subject to immigration control in Taiwan, but after they settle in Taiwan they can establish a household registration there to become a full citizen.

== See also ==
- Public records in China
- Hoju
- Hộ khẩu
- Koseki
- Internal passport
- Propiska in the Soviet Union
- Resident registration in Russia
- Discrimination against people from rural areas
