= List of universities and colleges in Henan =

The following is a list of universities and colleges in Henan.

== Provincial ==
- Zhengzhou University (Project 211, Double First Class)
- Henan University (Double First Class)
- Henan Normal University
- Henan Agricultural University
- Anyang Normal University
- Henan College of Traditional Chinese Medicine
- Henan Polytechnic University
- Henan University of Animal Husbandry and Economy
- Henan University of Finance and Economics
- Henan University of Science and Technology
- Henan University of Technology
- Huanghe Science and Technology College
- Luoyang Institute of Science and Technology
- Nanyang Institute of Technology
- Nanyang Normal University
- North China University of Water Conservancy and Electric Power Ω
- Shangqiu Normal University
- Shengda Economics, Trade and Management College of Zhengzhou
- Sias International University
- Xinyang Agricultural College
- Xinyang Normal University
- Zhengzhou University of Light Industry Ω
- Zhongyuan University of Technology
- Nanyang Medical College
