= Nanyang Normal University =

University in Nanyang, China

- 南陽師範學院 (Chinese)
- Established: 1951
- Location: Nanyang, Henan, China; 32°58′30.234″N 112°29′24.904″E
- Campus: 852,000 m^{2} (0.329 sq mi)
- Website: www.nynu.edu.cn

Chinese name
- Traditional Chinese: 南陽師範學院
- Simplified Chinese: 南阳师范学院
Transcriptions
Standard Mandarin
- Hanyu Pinyin: Nányáng shīfàn xuéyuàn

The Nanyang Normal University is an ordinary undergraduate college in Henan Province. It was founded in 1951 in Nanyang Normal School of Henan Province. In 1958, it was upgraded to Nanyang Normal College. In 2000, it was upgraded to Nanyang Normal University. In 2007, through the evaluation of the undergraduate teaching level of the Ministry of Education, in 2011, it was approved as the "National Special Needs Talent Training Project – the bachelor degree awarded unit to carry out the training of master's degree graduate students". In 2016, it was identified as a demonstration application in Henan Province. The technical type of undergraduate colleges was approved in 2017 as a master's degree granting unit.

== See also ==
- Expressways of Henan
- China National Highways
- Expressways of China
- Henan
- Nanyang
- Wolong District
- Wancheng District
- Nanyang Institute of Technology
- Nanyang Normal University
- Nanyang Medical College
- Henan Polytechnic Institute
- Nanyang Vocational College of Agriculture
- List of universities and colleges in Henan
