= Zhu Shixi =

Chinese politician

- 朱是西

Communist Party Secretary of Nanyang
- In office July 2021 – May 2024
- Deputy: Wang Zhihui (mayor)
- Preceded by: Zhang Wenshen

Mayor of Zhumadian
- In office January 2018 – July 2021
- Party Secretary: Chen Xing
- Preceded by: Chen Xing
- Succeeded by: Li Yueyong

Personal details
- Born: April 1966 (age 60) Yu County, Henan, China
- Party: Chinese Communist Party
- Education: Henan University of Chinese Medicine; Nanyang Technological University

Zhu Shixi (Chinese: 朱是西; pinyin: Zhī Shìxī; born April 1966) is a former Chinese politician who spent his entire career in his home-province Henan. As of May 2024 he was under investigation by China's top anti-graft watchdog. Previously he served as party secretary of Nanyang and before that, mayor of Zhumadian. He is a representative of the 20th National Congress of the Chinese Communist Party. He was a delegate to the 13th National People's Congress.

== Early life and education ==
Zhu was born in Yu County (now Yuzhou), Henan, in April 1966, the year the Cultural Revolution broke out. In 1985, he enrolled at the Henan College of Chinese Medicine (now Henan University of Chinese Medicine), where he majored in traditional Chinese medical science.

== Career ==
After university, in October 1990, Zhu became an official of the Communist Youth League of China at the Zhengzhou First Steel Plant.

In February 1993, he was appointed assistant to the head of the Organization Department of the Communist Youth League of China in Zhengzhou, rising to head in August 1996. He was made deputy secretary in April 1998. He was appointed head of the Publicity Department of the CCP Xingyang Municipal Committee in November 2001 and was admitted to member of the CCP Xingyang Municipal Committee, the city's top authority. He was elevated to head of the Organization Department of the CCP Dengfeng Municipal Committee in October 2002 and was admitted to member of the CCP Dengfeng Committee, the city's top authority. He was chosen as deputy party secretary in June 2004, in addition to serving as director and party secretary of Mount Song Scenic Area Management Committee. He took office as deputy party secretary and governor of Shangjie District in January 2007 before being assigned to the similar position in Erqi District in November 2008. He took up the post of vice mayor of Zhengzhou in December 2011 and subsequently deputy head of the Organization Department of the CCP Henan Provincial Committee in September 2012. In December 2007, he was named acting mayor of Zhumadian, confirmed in January 2018. In July 2021, he was named party secretary of Nanyang, his first foray into a prefectural leadership role.

== Downfall ==
On 14 May 2024, Zhu was suspected of "serious violations of laws and regulations" by the Central Commission for Discipline Inspection (CCDI), the party's internal disciplinary body, and the National Supervisory Commission, the highest anti-corruption agency of China.

Government offices
Preceded by Chen Xing	Mayor of Zhumadian; 2018–2021	Succeeded by Li Yueyong
Party political offices
Preceded by Zhang Wenshen	Communist Party Secretary of Nanyang; 2021–2024	Succeeded by Wang Zhihui (1968 born)
