= Nanyang Institute of Technology =

Public college in Nanyang, Henan, China

- 南陽理工學院
- Location: Nanyang, Henan, China; 32°58′25.385″N 112°32′57.088″E
- Campus: 1.1733 km^{2}
- Website: nyist.edu.cn

Chinese name
- Traditional Chinese: 南陽理工學院
- Simplified Chinese: 南阳理工学院
Transcriptions
Standard Mandarin
- Hanyu Pinyin: Nányáng lǐgōng xuéyuàn

The Nanyang Institute of Technology (NYIST) is a public undergraduate college in Nanyang City, Henan Province, China. The school has 19 teaching colleges, covering nine departments of science, engineering, management, literature, economics, education, law, medicine, and art. There are more than 20,000 full-time students and students.

== See also ==
- Expressways of Henan
- China National Highways
- Expressways of China
- Henan
- Nanyang
- Wolong District
- Wancheng District
- Nanyang Normal University
- Nanyang Medical College
- List of universities and colleges in Henan
