= Hanhua Subdistrict =

Hanhua Subdistrict 汉华街道
- Subdistrict
- Location in Henan
- Coordinates: 32°31′11″N 112°22′3″E
- Country: People's Republic of China
- Province: Henan
- Prefecture-level city: Nanyang
- County: Xinye County
- Time zone: UTC+8 (China Standard)

Hanhua Subdistrict (simplified Chinese: 汉华街道; traditional Chinese: 漢華街道; pinyin: Hànhuá Jiēdào) is a subdistrict in Xinye County, Nanyang, Henan province, China. As of 2018, it has 7 residential communities under its administration.

== See also ==
- List of township-level divisions of Henan
