= Nanyang East railway station =

Railway station in Nanyang, Henan, China

Nanyangdong 南阳东
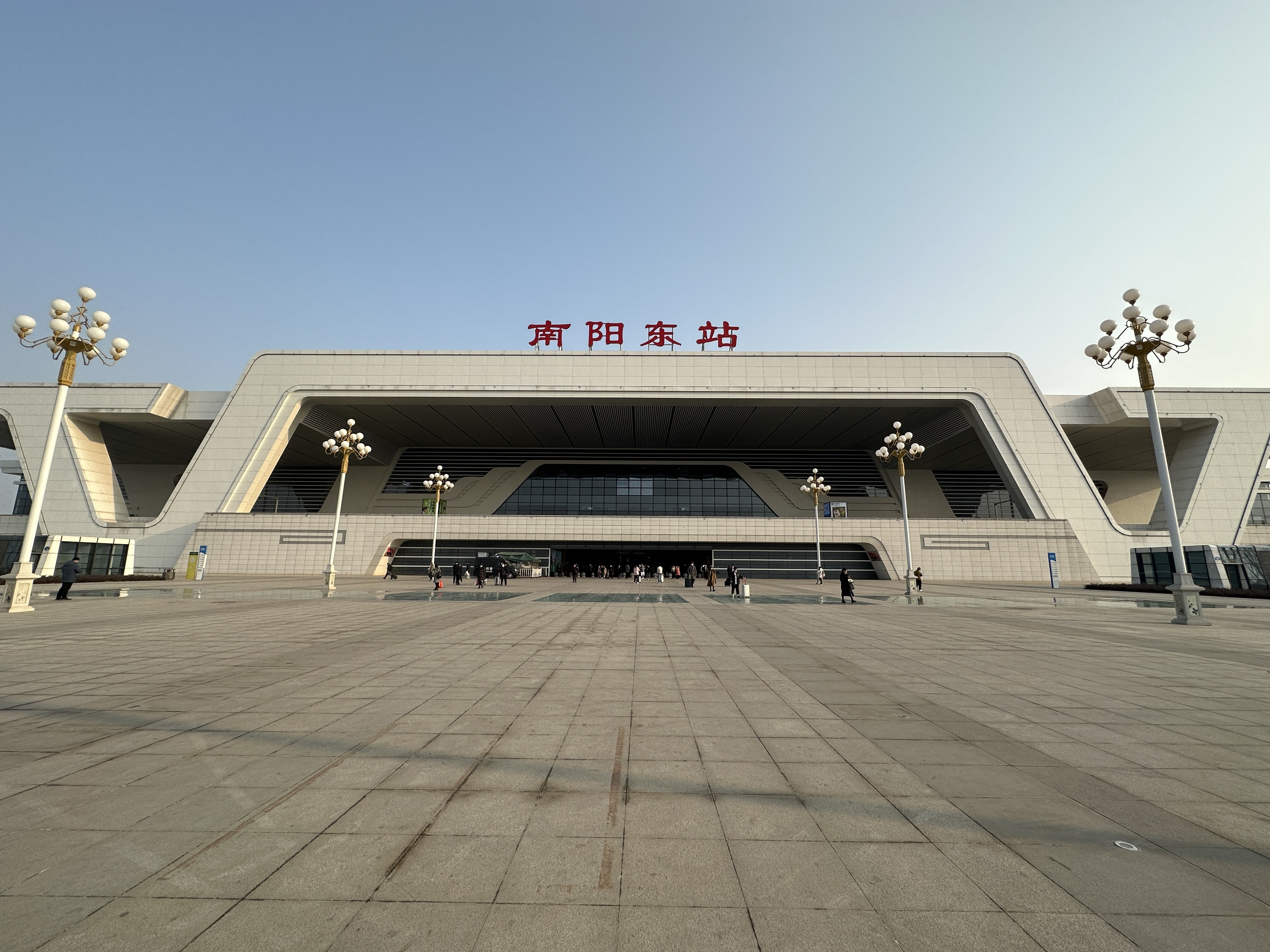

General information
- Other names: Nanyang East
- Location: Wancheng District, Nanyang, Henan; China
- Coordinates: 32.952264°N 112.656761°E
- Operator: CR Zhengzhou
- Lines: China Railway High-Speed: Zhengzhou–Wanzhou high-speed railway
- Platforms: 5 (2 island platforms and 1 side platforms)
- Tracks: 7

Other information
- Station code: 65485 (TMIS code); NOF (telegraph code); NYD (Pinyin code)
- Classification: First Class station

History
- Opened: December 1, 2019

Key dates
- 2019-12-01: The section between Zhengzhou East and Xiangyang East started operation on 1 December 2019

Services
Preceding station	China Railway High-speed	Following station
Fangcheng towards Zhengzhou East	Zhengzhou–Wanzhou high-speed railway	Dengzhou East towards Wanzhou North
Location
- Location within Henan Location within China

The Nanyangdong (Nanyang East) railway station (simplified Chinese: 南阳东站; traditional Chinese: 南陽東站; pinyin: nányáng dōngzhàn) is a railway station for high-speed trains in Nanyang, Henan, China. It was opened on December 1, 2019 with the Zhengzhou to Xiangyang section of Zhengzhou–Wanzhou high-speed railway.

== Station layout ==
The station looks like a soaring dragon. The gross floor area is 50,680 square meters, which makes Nanyangdong the largest trackside station in China. Inside the station, Zhuge Liang's Chu Shi Biao (出师表) and Li Bai's Nan Du Xing (南都行) were carved on the wall.

== Services ==
As of June 20, 2022, Nanyangdong railway station handles around 100 trains daily, 37 of which originate/terminate here.

== See also ==
- Nanyang railway station
