= Xinye County =

Xinye County 新野县 Sinyeh
- County
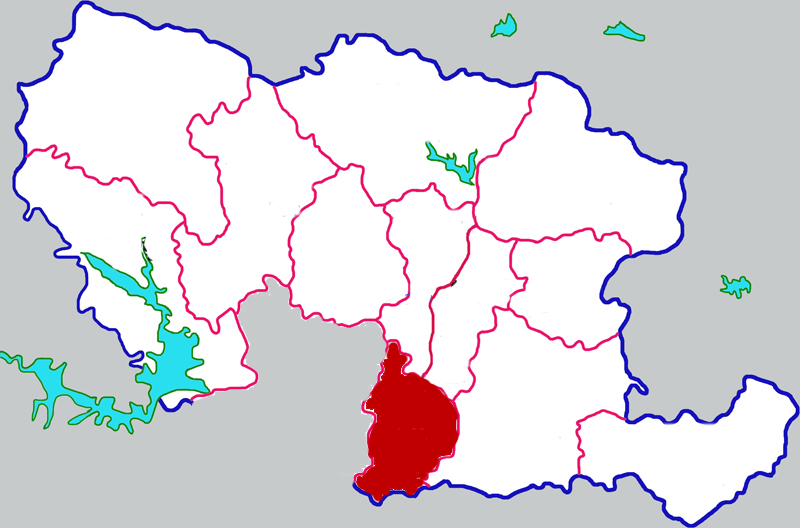
- Xinye in Nanyang

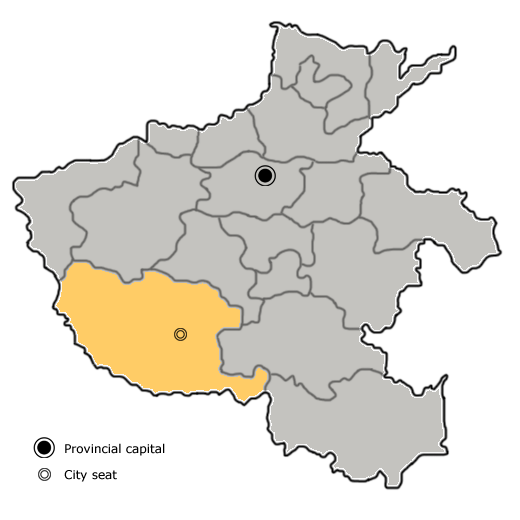
- Nanyang in Henan
- Coordinates: 32°31′15″N 112°21′36″E
- Country: People's Republic of China
- Province: Henan
- Prefecture-level city: Nanyang

Area
  - Total: 1,062 km^{2} (410 sq mi)

Population (2020)
  - Total: 602,827
  - Density: 567.6/km^{2} (1,470/sq mi)
- Time zone: UTC+8 (China Standard)
- Postal code: 473500

Xinye (Chinese: 新野; pinyin: Xīnyě; Wade–Giles: Hsin-yeh) is one of the counties of Nanyang that lies in the southwest of Henan province, China. To the south lies the prefecture-level city of Xiangyang in Hubei province, to the east is Tanghe County and to the west is the county-level city of Dengzhou. According to the 2020 Chinese Census, the population of Xinye county is 602,827. Its total area is 1,062 km^{2} (410 sq mi). Xinye is largely flat terrain. The county possesses natural resources including oil, natural gas, and geothermal deposits.

The G55 Erenhot–Guangzhou Expressway runs through Waizi town, which is the northmost town of Xinye. Both Nanyang Jiangying Airport and Xiangyang Liuji Airport are about 60 km (37 mi) away from Xinye.

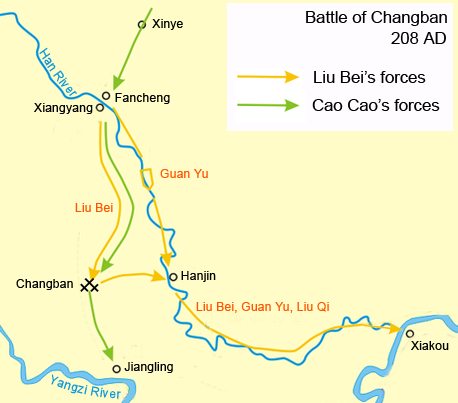
Map of the old Jingzhou in the early 3rd century CE. Xinye was the place where the forces of Liu Bei were stationed before they were forced to retreat by the army of Cao Cao.

== History ==
Near the end of the Han Dynasty, the warlord Liu Bei used Xinye as a base, as a vassal under Liu Biao. Liu Biao himself had been residing in Xiangyang. Liu Bei lost Xinye to Cao Cao in 208 and retreated to the southeast in prelude to the battle of the Red Cliffs.

== Administrative divisions ==
As of 2012, this county is divided to 2 subdistricts, 8 towns and 5 townships.

Subdistricts

- Hanhua Subdistrict (汉华街道)
- Hancheng Subdistrict (汉城街道)

Towns

- Wangzhuang (王庄镇)
- Shayan (沙堰镇)
- Xindianpu (新甸铺镇)
- Wuxing (五星镇)
- Shi'an (施庵镇)
- Waizi (歪子镇)
- Lihepu (溧河铺镇)
- Wangji (王集镇)

Townships

- Chengjiao Township (城郊乡)
- Qiangaomiao Township (前高庙乡)
- Fanji Township (樊集乡)
- Shangzhuang Township (上庄乡)
- Shanggang Township (上港乡)

== Climate ==
Climate data for Xinye, elevation 88 m (289 ft), (1991–2020 normals, extremes 1981–2010)
Month	Jan	Feb	Mar	Apr	May	Jun	Jul	Aug	Sep	Oct	Nov	Dec	Year
Record high °C (°F)	21.7 (71.1)	22.9 (73.2)	28.9 (84.0)	33.2 (91.8)	38.9 (102.0)	40.2 (104.4)	39.8 (103.6)	38.2 (100.8)	40.3 (104.5)	33.2 (91.8)	30.3 (86.5)	21.4 (70.5)	40.3 (104.5)
Mean daily maximum °C (°F)	7.2 (45.0)	10.8 (51.4)	15.8 (60.4)	22.2 (72.0)	27.6 (81.7)	31.3 (88.3)	32.0 (89.6)	31.3 (88.3)	27.5 (81.5)	22.6 (72.7)	15.6 (60.1)	9.5 (49.1)	21.1 (70.0)
Daily mean °C (°F)	2.2 (36.0)	5.1 (41.2)	10.1 (50.2)	16.1 (61.0)	21.6 (70.9)	25.8 (78.4)	27.5 (81.5)	26.6 (79.9)	22.2 (72.0)	16.8 (62.2)	10.0 (50.0)	4.2 (39.6)	15.7 (60.2)
Mean daily minimum °C (°F)	−1.7 (28.9)	0.7 (33.3)	5.3 (41.5)	10.9 (51.6)	16.4 (61.5)	21.3 (70.3)	23.9 (75.0)	23.1 (73.6)	18.4 (65.1)	12.4 (54.3)	5.8 (42.4)	0.1 (32.2)	11.4 (52.5)
Record low °C (°F)	−12.6 (9.3)	−12.3 (9.9)	−8.1 (17.4)	−0.2 (31.6)	4.9 (40.8)	11.3 (52.3)	17.6 (63.7)	13.9 (57.0)	8.7 (47.7)	−0.2 (31.6)	−5.5 (22.1)	−14.3 (6.3)	−14.3 (6.3)
Average precipitation mm (inches)	15.0 (0.59)	17.5 (0.69)	36.6 (1.44)	50.0 (1.97)	89.5 (3.52)	106.4 (4.19)	143.0 (5.63)	110.7 (4.36)	70.0 (2.76)	58.1 (2.29)	34.5 (1.36)	13.5 (0.53)	744.8 (29.33)
Average precipitation days (≥ 0.1 mm)	4.8	6.1	7.8	8.3	10.2	9.4	11.0	10.0	9.4	8.8	6.9	5.1	97.8
Average snowy days	4.2	3.0	1.0	0	0	0	0	0	0	0	0.8	2.3	11.3
Average relative humidity (%)	72	71	73	74	71	73	82	82	77	74	75	72	75
Mean monthly sunshine hours	109.6	115.4	145.5	172.4	185.3	172.9	178.5	182.3	148.3	143.6	127.6	122.1	1,803.5
Percentage possible sunshine	34	37	39	44	43	41	41	45	40	41	41	39	40
Source: China Meteorological Administration
