= Waizi =

Waizi 歪子镇
- Town
- Location in Henan
- Coordinates: 32°43′41″N 112°23′06″E
- Country: People's Republic of China
- Province: Henan
- Prefecture-level city: Nanyang
- County: Xinye
- Time zone: UTC+8 (China Standard)

Waizi town (simplified Chinese: 歪子镇; traditional Chinese: 歪子鎮; pinyin: Wāizǐ Zhèn) is the northernmost town of Xinye County that lies in the southwest of Henan province, China. It has a population of 70,000. Its total area is 102 square kilometers. The G55 Erenhot–Guangzhou Expressway runs through this town and has an exit here.
