= Huanghou =

Huanghou may refer to:

- Empress of China
- Huanghou Township, Nanzhao County, Henan, China
