= Wangcun Township, Nanyang, Henan =

Wangcun Township 王村乡
- Township
- Location in Henan
- Coordinates: 33°00′54″N 112°25′04″E
- Country: People's Republic of China
- Province: Henan
- Prefecture-level city: Nanyang
- District: Wolong
- Elevation: 147 m (482 ft)
- Time zone: UTC+8 (China Standard)
- Area code: 0377

Wangcun (Chinese: 王村; pinyin: Wángcūn) is a township in Wolong District, Nanyang, Henan, People's Republic of China, located in the western suburbs of Nanyang along China National Highway 312 (G312) just east of the G312 interchange with G55 Erenhot–Guangzhou Expressway. As of 2011, it has 12 villages under its administration.

== See also ==
- List of township-level divisions of Henan
