= Nanyang railway station =

Railway station on Jiaozuo–Liuzhou railway, China

Nanyang railway station 南阳火车站
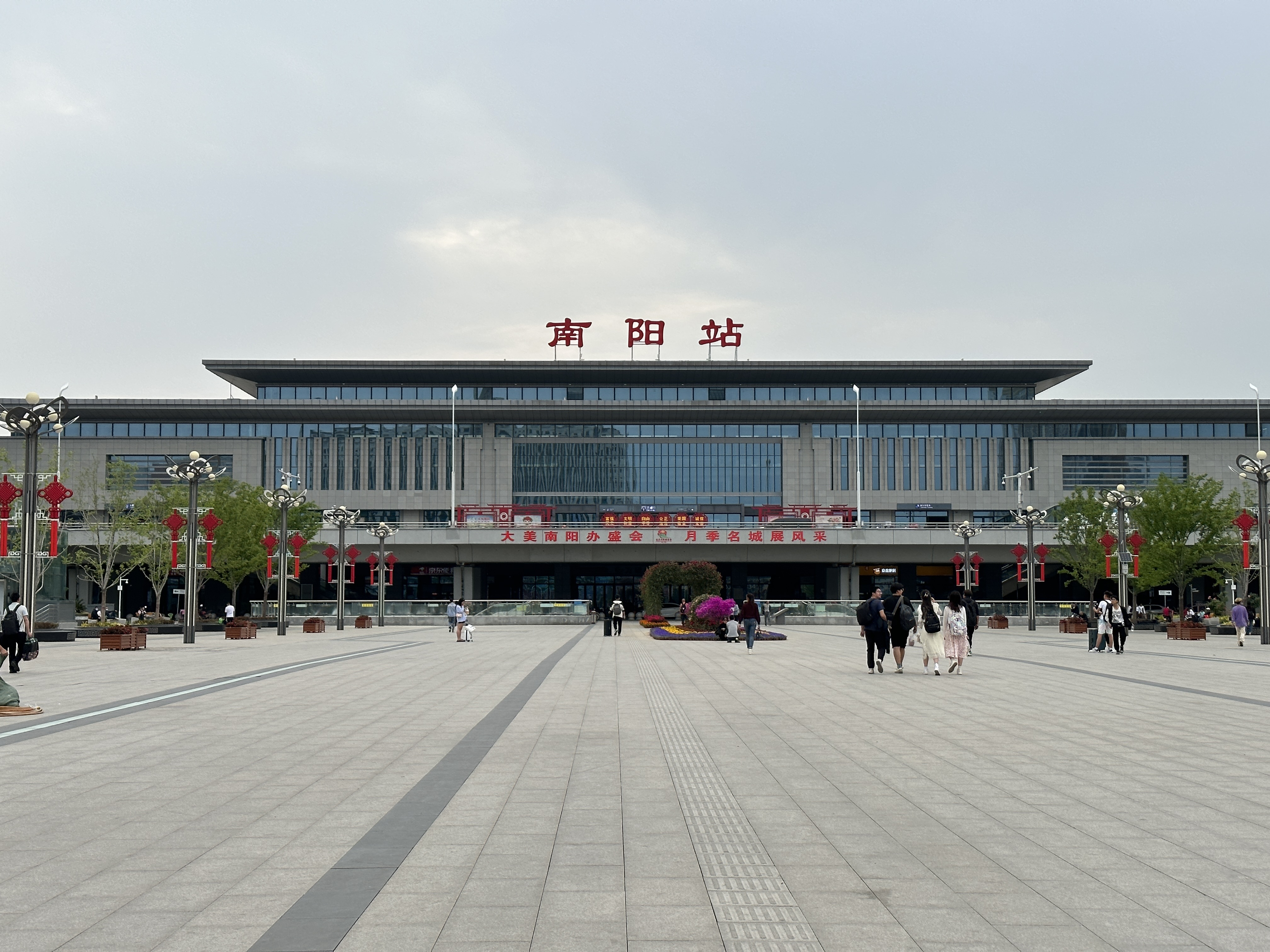
- Nanyang railway station in 2023

General information
- Location: Wolong District, Nanyang, Henan; China
- Coordinates: 33.0005°N 112.5061°E
- Train operators: China Railway Zhengzhou Group
Location

Nanyang railway station
- Traditional Chinese: 南陽火車站
- Simplified Chinese: 南阳火车站
Transcriptions
Standard Mandarin
- Hanyu Pinyin: Nányáng huǒchē zhàn

Nanyang railway station (simplified Chinese: 南阳火车站; traditional Chinese: 南陽火車站; pinyin: Nányáng huǒchē zhàn is a first-class railway station in Nanyang, Henan, China on the Nanjing–Xi'an railway and Jiaozuo–Liuzhou railway operated byt China Railway Zhengzhou Group.

== History ==
The station was built in 1970. In May 2017, work began on rebuilding the station. The existing station building was demolished and a new building constructed. The rebuilt station opened on 26 December 2018. A West Square expansion is planned.

== See also ==
- Nanyang East railway station
