= Liushan, Henan =

Liushan 留山镇
- Town
- Location in Henan
- Coordinates: 33°28′23″N 112°32′17″E
- Country: People's Republic of China
- Province: Henan
- Prefecture-level city: Nanyang
- County: Nanzhao County
- Time zone: UTC+8 (China Standard)

Liushan (Chinese: 留山) is a town in Nanzhao County, Nanyang, in Henan province, China. As of 2020, it administers Jianshe (建设) Residential Neighborhood and the following 20 villages:

- Dagou Village (大沟村)
- Shangguan Village (上官村)
- Linglongshan Village (玲珑山村)
- Mawan Village (马湾村)
- Xiaguan Village (下关村)
- Xilin'an Village (西林庵村)
- Tumen Village (土门村)
- Zhangzhuang Village (张庄村)
- Youfang Village (油坊村)
- Haohan Village (好汉村)
- Xijie Village (西街村)
- Dongjie Village (东街村)
- Guopaidian Village (郭拍店村)
- Panzhai Village (潘寨村)
- Shilingwan Village (石岭湾村)
- Chuwan Village (褚湾村)
- Guanpo Village (官坡村)
- Huanglian Village (黄楝村)
- Hezhuang Village (贺庄村)
- Yangba Village (杨扒村)
