= Wolong, Nanyang =

Wolong 卧龙区
- District

Wolong District transcription(s)

卧龙区 transcription(s)
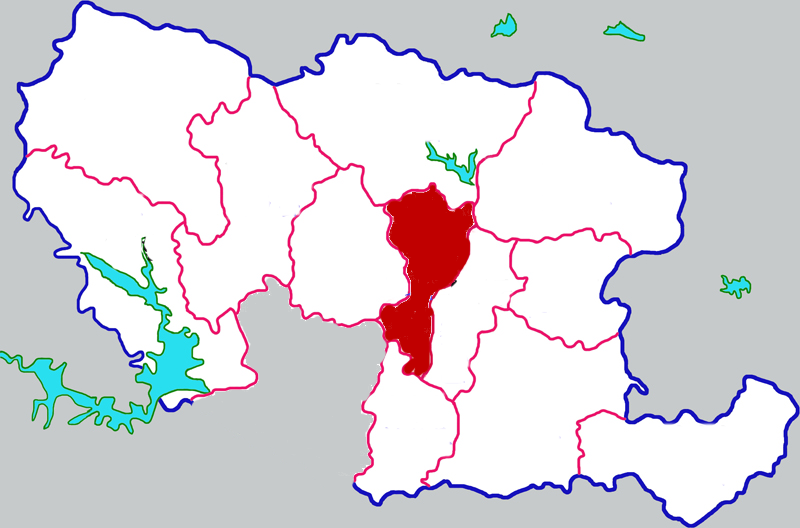
- Wolong in Nanyang. Note the map does not include the sub-prefecture-level city of Dengzhou.

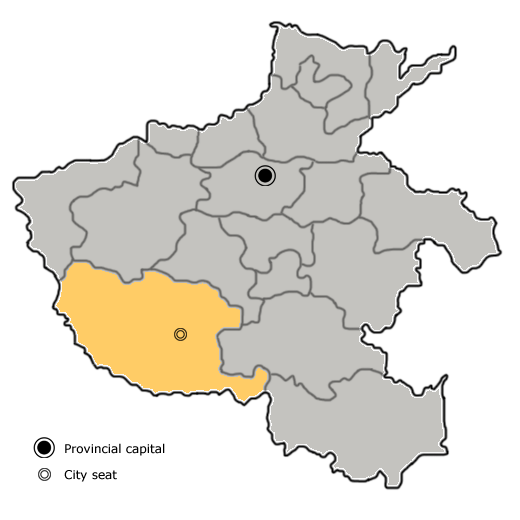
- Nanyang in Henan
- Coordinates (Nanyang government): 32°59′26″N 112°31′42″E
- Country: People's Republic of China
- Province: Henan
- Prefecture-level city: Nanyang

Area
  - District: 1,007 km^{2} (389 sq mi)
  - Urban: 27 km^{2} (10 sq mi)
  - Rural: 990 km^{2} (380 sq mi)
- Highest elevation: 417.6 m (1,370 ft)
- Lowest elevation: 90 m (300 ft)

Population (2019)
  - District: 963,800
  - Density: 957.1/km^{2} (2,479/sq mi)
  - Urban: 330,000
  - Urban density: 12,000/km^{2} (32,000/sq mi)
  - Rural: 598,900
  - Rural density: 600/km^{2} (1,600/sq mi)
- Time zone: UTC+8 (China Standard)
- Postal code: 473000
- Area code: 0377
- Website: www.wolong.gov.cn

Wolong District (simplified Chinese: 卧龙区; traditional Chinese: 臥龍區; pinyin: Wòlóng Qū) is a District in the center part of Nanyang, in the southwest of Henan province, People's Republic of China. It possesses a total area of 1,017 km^{2} (393 sq mi), and has a population of 930,000.

== Geography ==
Within this area, the land level is much higher in the north than in the south.

The Wolong District is part of the Yangtze River Basin.

== Administrative divisions ==
As of 2012, this district is divided to 9 subdistricts, 7 towns and 4 townships.

Subdistricts

- Qiyi Subdistrict (七一街道)
- Wolonggang Subdistrict (卧龙岗街道)
- Wuhou Subdistrict (武侯街道)
- Meixi Subdistrict (梅溪街道)
- Chezhan Subdistrict (车站街道)
- Guangwu Subdistrict (光武街道)
- Jingang Subdistrict (靳岗街道)
- Zhangheng Subdistrict (张衡街道)
- Bailixi Subdistrict (百里奚街道)

Towns

- Shiqiao (石桥镇)
- Liaohe (潦河镇)
- Angao (安皋镇)
- Pushan (蒲山镇)
- Luying (陆营镇)
- Qinghua (青华镇)
- Yingzhuang (英庄镇)

Townships

- Qiliyuan Township (七里园乡)
- Xiezhuang Township (谢庄乡)
- Wangcun Township (王村乡)
- Longxing Township (龙兴乡)

== Education ==
=== Higher education ===
- Nanyang Institute of Technology
- Nanyang Normal University
- Nanyang Medical College
- Nanyang Vocational College of Agriculture(南陽農業職業學院)

== Infrastructure ==
=== Transport ===
==== Highways and expressways ====
- China National Highway 312
- G40 Shanghai–Xi'an Expressway
- G55 Erenhot–Guangzhou Expressway

== See also ==
- Expressways of Henan
- China National Highways
- Expressways of China
- Henan
- Nanyang, Henan
- Wancheng District
