= Mount Du =

Mountain in the country of China

- Location within China

Highest point
- Elevation: 367.8 m (1,207 ft)
- Coordinates: 33°4′13″N 112°35′11″E

Geography
- Location: Nanyang, Henan, China

Mount Du (Chinese: 独山; pinyin: Dú Shān), which means Lonely Hill in Chinese, is a small mountain near Nanyang City, Henan province, China.

== Mine ==
The hill is rich in a jade substitute or simulant stone, saussurite. "Dushan jade" is a misnomer. It is not the true jade found in Xinjiang, China: nephrite, a CaMg silicate (Si), nor the true jade found in Burma: jadeite, a NaAl silicate (Si). It is a fine grained mixture of feldspar and epidote. It is currently marketed under the names, Dushan jade, Swiss jade (1st identified by Swiss mineralogist), and Nanyang jade (Nanyang, Henan Province).

== Local culture ==
On the third day of the third month of the Chinese calendar, people climb the mountain.
