= Wolong Gang =

Coordinates: 32°58′42″N 112°30′30″E

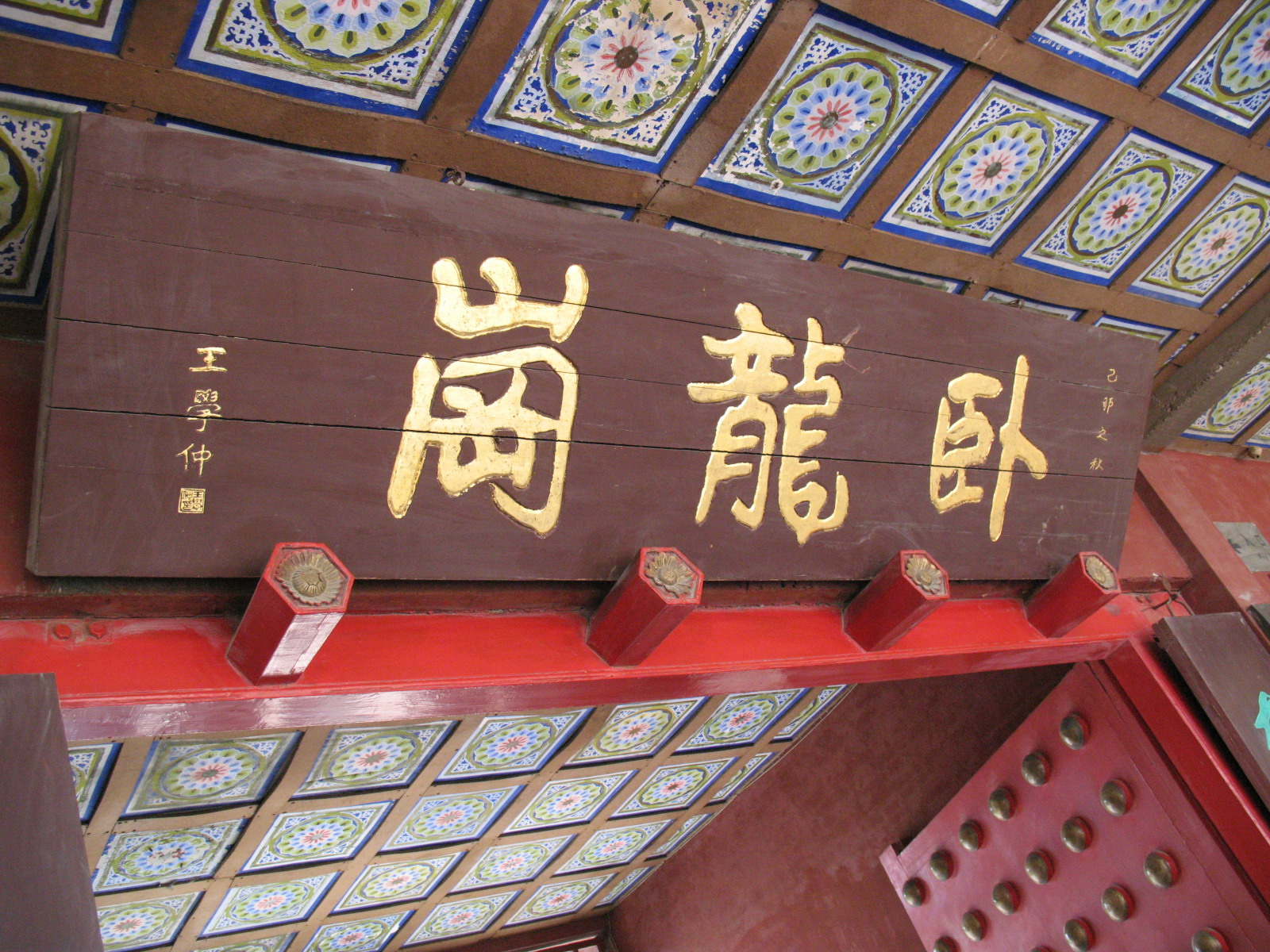
Entrance to the temple of the Marquis of Wu

Wolong Gang (simplified Chinese: 卧龙岗; traditional Chinese: 臥龍崗; pinyin: Wòlóng Gāng) is a cultural site and scenic area in the Chinese city of Nanyang, Henan. It is famous for having been the home of the strategist Zhuge Liang before his rise to prominence during the Three Kingdoms period. Zhuge lived in the area for about ten years, and it is now known by his epithet Wolong 卧龙, which means 'crouching dragon'.

== History ==
The worship of Zhuge Liang in Wolong Gang dates from the Jin dynasty. It flourished during the Tang dynasty and Song dynasty. In 1317, Emperor Renzong of Yuan gave the historic buildings in Wolong Gang the name of Temple of the Marquis of Wu. In 1711, historic buildings were rebuilt according to the traditional Longgang full picture. The Qing dynasty built the Wolong gang ten scenic spots and Wolong Academy.

Nowadays, Wolong Gang has historic buildings built during the Yuan dynasty, the Ming dynasty and the Qing dynasty. Wolong Gang also has stone inscriptions, steles, and the couplet, all of them dating from the Han dynasty to the Qing dynasty. It has more of this kind of cultural relic than the other temples of the Marquis of Wu in China. Yue Fei's handwritten stone inscription Chu Shi Biao is very precious among them.

== Literary works ==
谒武侯祠

卧龙一去已千载，
此地隆然尚有冈。
庙食不随炎祚冷，
陇耕犹认草庐芳。

Visiting the temple of the Marquis of Wu

Wolong had passed away for nearly a thousand years,
There is still a rising hillock here.
The sacrifice in the temple of the Marquis of Wu didn't become cold because of Shu Han's perdition,
It seemed that the plowland still knew the fragrance of Zhuge Liang's thatched cottage.

== Tourist attraction ==
- Temple of the Marquis of Wu of Nanyang: a place to worship Zhuge Liang and an important heritage site under state protection in China.
- Hanhua Museum: a museum which mainly displays Han dynasty stone pictures.
