= Nanyang Jiangying Airport =

Airport serving Nanyang, Henan, China

Nanyang Jiangying Airport 南阳姜营机场
- IATA: NNY; ICAO: ZHNY

Summary
- Airport type: Public
- Serves: Nanyang, Henan, China
- Location: Jiangying, Wancheng, Nanyang, Henan, China
- Opened: October 1992; 34 years ago
- Elevation AMSL: 125 m (410 ft)
- Coordinates: 32°58′42″N 112°36′48″E

Map
- Location of airport in Henan

Runways
| Direction | Length | | Surface |
| Direction | m | ft | Surface |
|---|---|---|---|
| 05/23 | 2,800 | 9,186 | Concrete |

Statistics (2025)
- Passengers: 1,036,774 ▲7.1%
- Aircraft movements: 60,924 ▲16.9%
- Cargo (metric tons): 758.6 ▲20.7%
- Source:China's busiest airports by passenger traffic, CAAC

Nanyang Jiangying Airport
- Simplified Chinese: 南阳姜营机场
- Traditional Chinese: 南陽薑營機場
Transcriptions
Standard Mandarin
- Hanyu Pinyin: Nányáng Jiāngyíng Jīchǎng

Nanyang Jiangying Airport (IATA: NNY, ICAO: ZHNY) is an airport serving the city of Nanyang in Henan Province, China. It is located near Jiangying, in Wancheng District, 12 km (7.5 mi) east of the city center. The airport was opened in October 1992 and expanded in 1998. It is currently undergoing another phase of expansion.

== Facilities ==
The airport has one runway that is 2,800 meters (9,200 ft) long and 50 meters (160 ft) wide (class 4D), and an 8,262-square-metre (88,930 sq ft) terminal building.

== History ==
The original Nanyang Airport was built in April 1934 and occupied by the Japanese during World War II. After the war it was used as a military airport with some civil flights. In October 1992 the new Jiangying Airport was built at the current location with an investment of 77 million yuan, and the old airport was closed. The new runway was 1,800 m (5,900 ft) long and 45 m (148 ft) wide. In 1998 the airport was expanded at a cost of 22.8 million yuan, lengthening the runway to 2,300 m (7,500 ft). Scheduled flights to Guangzhou, Shanghai, and Beijing started in 2004.

== Airlines and destinations ==
| Airlines | Destinations |
|---|---|
| Air Chang'an | Sanya, Xi'an |
| Beijing Capital Airlines | Hangzhou |
| China Southern Airlines | Guangzhou, Jieyang, Shanghai–Pudong, Shenzhen, Urumqi |
| GX Airlines | Haikou, Qingdao |
| Jiangxi Air | Nanchang, Nanjing |
| Ruili Airlines | Harbin, Kunming |
| Spring Airlines | Shenzhen |
| Tianjin Airlines | Tianjin |

== See also ==
- List of airports in China
- List of the busiest airports in China
