= Nanzhao County =

Nanzhao County 南召县 Nanchao
- County
- Location of the seat in Henan
- Coordinates: 33°29′24″N 112°24′0″E
- Country: People's Republic of China
- Province: Henan
- Prefecture-level city: Nanyang

Area
  - Total: 2,946 km^{2} (1,137 sq mi)

Population (2002)
  - Total: 548,400
  - Density: 186.2/km^{2} (482.1/sq mi)
- Time zone: UTC+8 (China Standard)
- Postal code: 474650
- Area code: 0377
- Website: www.nanzhao.gov.cn

Nanzhao County (Chinese: 南召县; pinyin: Nánzhào Xiàn) is a county under the jurisdiction of Nanyang City, in the southwest of Henan province, China, has an area of 2,946 km^{2} (1,137 sq mi) and a population of 600,000 as of 2002.

== Administrative divisions ==
As of 2012, this county is divided to 8 towns and 8 townships.

Towns

- Chengguan (城关镇)
- Liushan (留山镇)
- Yunyang (云阳镇)
- Huangludian (皇路店镇)
- Nanhedian (南河店镇)
- Banshanping (板山坪镇)
- Qiaoduan (乔端镇)
- Baitugang (白土岗镇)

Townships

- Chengjiao Township (城郊乡)
- Xiaodian Township (小店乡)
- Huanghou Township (皇后乡)
- Taishanmiao Township (太山庙乡)
- Shimen Township (石门乡)
- Sikeshu Township (四棵树乡)
- Mashiping Township (马市坪乡)
- Cuizhuang Township (崔庄乡)

== Climate ==
Climate data for Nanzhao, elevation 244 m (801 ft), (1991–2020 normals, extremes 1981–2010)
Month	Jan	Feb	Mar	Apr	May	Jun	Jul	Aug	Sep	Oct	Nov	Dec	Year
Record high °C (°F)	20.4 (68.7)	25.2 (77.4)	28.1 (82.6)	35.9 (96.6)	39.0 (102.2)	40.4 (104.7)	39.5 (103.1)	37.9 (100.2)	38.5 (101.3)	33.5 (92.3)	27.4 (81.3)	21.4 (70.5)	40.4 (104.7)
Mean daily maximum °C (°F)	7.0 (44.6)	10.5 (50.9)	16.0 (60.8)	22.6 (72.7)	27.5 (81.5)	30.9 (87.6)	31.6 (88.9)	30.9 (87.6)	26.8 (80.2)	21.9 (71.4)	15.1 (59.2)	9.1 (48.4)	20.8 (69.5)
Daily mean °C (°F)	1.4 (34.5)	4.7 (40.5)	10.1 (50.2)	16.4 (61.5)	21.5 (70.7)	25.4 (77.7)	27.0 (80.6)	26.1 (79.0)	21.6 (70.9)	15.9 (60.6)	9.1 (48.4)	3.3 (37.9)	15.2 (59.4)
Mean daily minimum °C (°F)	−2.7 (27.1)	0.0 (32.0)	5.0 (41.0)	10.7 (51.3)	15.8 (60.4)	20.3 (68.5)	23.2 (73.8)	22.3 (72.1)	17.5 (63.5)	11.3 (52.3)	4.6 (40.3)	−1.0 (30.2)	10.6 (51.0)
Record low °C (°F)	−10.6 (12.9)	−11.9 (10.6)	−6.2 (20.8)	0.0 (32.0)	4.1 (39.4)	11.7 (53.1)	16.7 (62.1)	12.4 (54.3)	7.5 (45.5)	−2.0 (28.4)	−6.7 (19.9)	−14.6 (5.7)	−14.6 (5.7)
Average precipitation mm (inches)	7.6 (0.30)	11.6 (0.46)	24.8 (0.98)	42.8 (1.69)	79.9 (3.15)	95.6 (3.76)	235.3 (9.26)	169.9 (6.69)	91.0 (3.58)	46.8 (1.84)	28.0 (1.10)	7.6 (0.30)	840.9 (33.11)
Average precipitation days (≥ 0.1 mm)	3.8	4.8	6.4	7.5	9.2	9.0	13.5	12.5	10.4	7.8	5.9	4.1	94.9
Average snowy days	4.3	2.7	1.1	0.1	0	0	0	0	0	0	0.7	2.1	11
Average relative humidity (%)	67	65	63	65	64	69	79	78	76	74	73	68	70
Mean monthly sunshine hours	108.7	116.0	150.8	176.8	184.7	169.3	154.7	163.3	143.3	141.7	123.9	121.7	1,754.9
Percentage possible sunshine	34	37	40	45	43	39	36	40	39	41	40	40	40
Source: China Meteorological Administration

== Transportation ==
- China National Highway 305
