= Luoyang Institute of Science and Technology =

Educational institute in Luoyang, China

Coordinates: 34.6287°N 112.4372°E

Luoyang Institute of Science and Technology (洛阳理工学院(LIT)) is an educational institute in the Chinese city of Luoyang, which belongs to regionally renowned universities. It has three campuses: Wangcheng, Kaiyuan and Jiudu, covering an area of 2229 acres, contains 17 departments. The school is founded as Sanmenxia Hydroelectric School in 1956, and merged with Luoyang University in 2007. Training bases founded by China Building Materials Federation and China Metallurgical Machine Building Materials Union are located in the school. In 2008, former "No.1 High School Attached to LYC Bearing Co., Ltd" was renamed as Senior High School Affiliated to Luoyang Institute of Science and Technology, which since then as become a subsidiary high school of the institute.
