= Huanghou Township =

Huanghou Township 皇后乡
- Township
- Location in Henan
- Coordinates: 33°28′42″N 112°45′15″E
- Country: People's Republic of China
- Province: Henan
- Prefecture-level city: Nanyang
- County: Nanzhao County
- Time zone: UTC+8 (China Standard)

Huanghou Township (simplified Chinese: 皇后乡; traditional Chinese: 皇后鄉; pinyin: Huánghòu Xiāng) is a township in Nanzhao County, Henan, China. As of 2020, it administers Hongyang (宏扬) Residential Neighborhood and the following fourteen villages:

- Huanghou Village
- Tianqiao Village (天桥村)
- Guozhuang Village (郭庄村)
- Hongqi Village (红旗村)
- Niangniangmiao Village (娘娘庙村)
- Beizhaodian Village (北召店村)
- Suwan Village (苏湾村)
- Liangshuiquan Village (凉水泉村)
- Panping Village (潘坪村)
- Xinzhuang Village (辛庄村)
- Wang Village (王村)
- Fenshuiling Village (分水岭村)
- Zhuzhuang Village (朱庄村)
- Kangzhuang Village (康庄村)
