= First Affiliated Hospital of Henan University of Chinese Medicine =

First Affiliated Hospital of Henan University of Chinese Medicine (Chinese: 河南中医药大学第一附属医院)
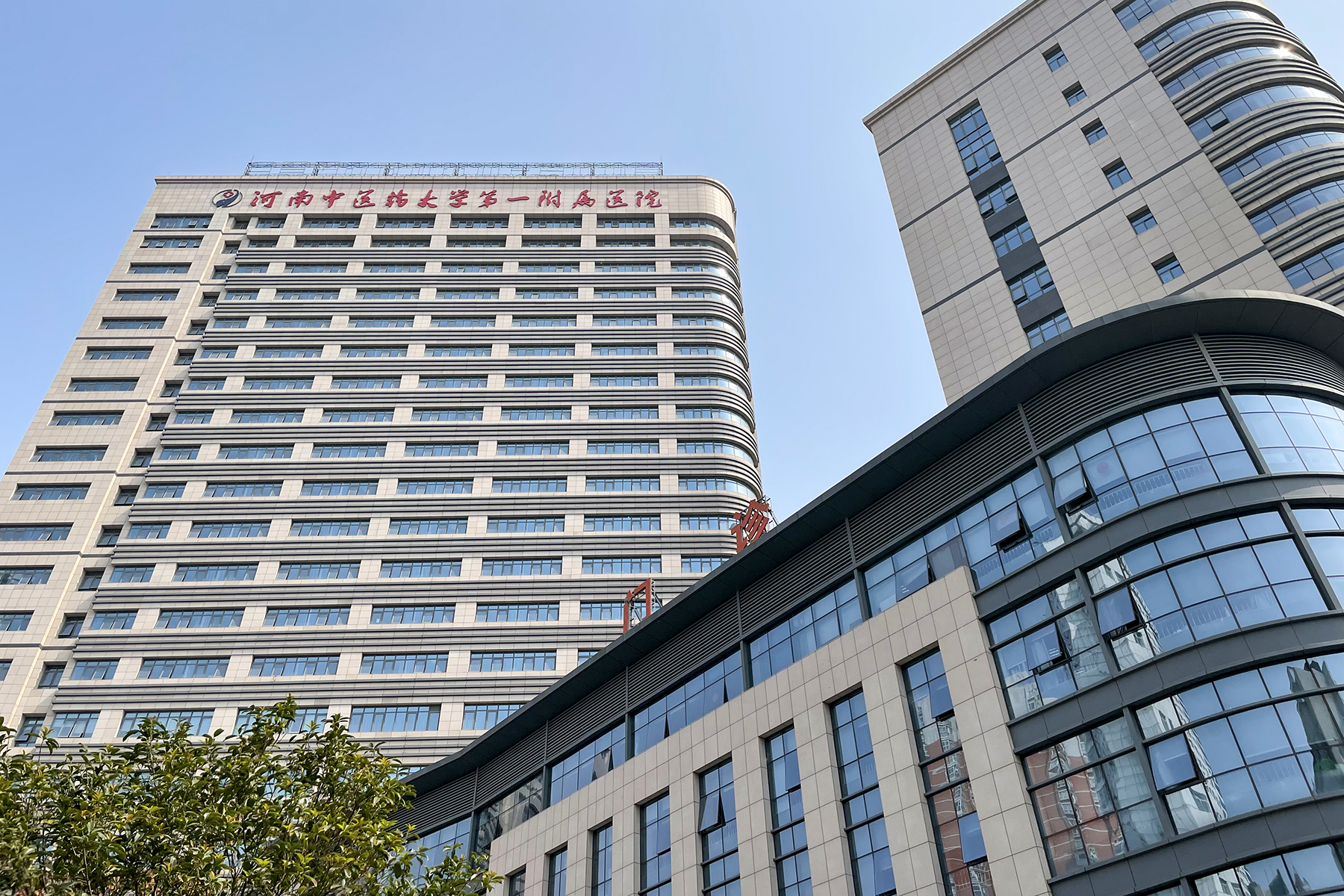

Geography
- Location: China

Organisation
- Type: comprehensive teaching
- Affiliated university: Henan University of Chinese Medicine

Services
- Standards: Grade A tertiary hospital

History
- Founded: 1953

Links
- Website: www.hnzhy.com

The First Affiliated Hospital of Henan University of Chinese Medicine is a Grade A tertiary hospital in Zhengzhou, capital of Henan Province in China. It is the largest comprehensive hospital of Traditional Chinese Medicine (TCM) in the Province, responsible for medical treatment, research and education.

== History ==
In 1953, the Traditional Chinese Medicine Clinic for the military and government agencies of the Henan Provincial People's Government was established. It later merged with the Kaifeng No. 1 Integrated TCM-Western Medicine Hospital to form the Henan Provincial Hospital of Traditional Chinese Medicine.

In 1956, the hispital relocated with the provincial government to its current site in Zhengzhou.

In 1959, the hispital came under the administration of Henan College of Traditional Chinese Medicine and was renamed the "Affiliated Hospital of Henan College of Traditional Chinese Medicine". At that time, it had 200 beds.

In 1988, the hospital was officially renamed the "First Affiliated Hospital of Henan College of Traditional Chinese Medicine."

In 2015, following the renaming of Henan College of Traditional Chinese Medicine to Henan University of Chinese Medicine, the hospital was renamed the "First Affiliated Hospital of Henan University of Chinese Medicine"

In 2025, the hospital was selected as a national Standardization Research and Transformation Center for Traditional Chinese Medicine.

== Current situation ==
The First Affiliated Hospital of Henan University of Chinese Medicine is the largest 3A comprehensive hospital of traditional Chinese medicine in Henan Province.

There are two sub-hospitals:

- The Renmin Branch with a floor area of 44,620 sq m, and 2,600 beds.
- The Zhengzhou New District Branch with 179,013 sq m and 1,700 beds.

There are 2,800 Staff members, including one national medical master, 7 experts who have made national outstanding contributions.

There are 38 clinical departments and 12 technical departments.

Thete is a State Regional TCM Diagnosis and Treatment Center for the specialties of: Pediatrics, Pulmonary Disease, Hepatopathy, Rehabilitation, Encephalopathy, Cardiovascular.

The hospital undertakes teaching responsibilities for both undergraduate, and postgraduate programs—and serves as a key teaching base for Henan University of Chinese Medicine. The institution offers six specialized tracks, such as Integrated Traditional Chinese and Western Medicine and Rehabilitation Therapy; comprises 13 disciplines, including Internal Medicine of TCM and Surgery of TCM; and holds authorization to grant master's degrees in six fields, such as Internal Medicine of TCM.

The hospital published 12 papers listed in Nature Index for the Time frame of 1 March 2025 - 28 February 2026, ranking 868th globally and 312th in China.The hospital's overall academic ranking is sixth in the country, with its pulmonology and pediatrics departments maintaining their top positions nationwide.

The hospital is located at 19 Renmin Road, Zhengzhou, Henan Province.

== See also ==
- Henan University of Chinese Medicine
