= Huanghe Science and Technology College =

University in Zhengzhou, China

Coordinates: 34.6894°N 113.6710°E

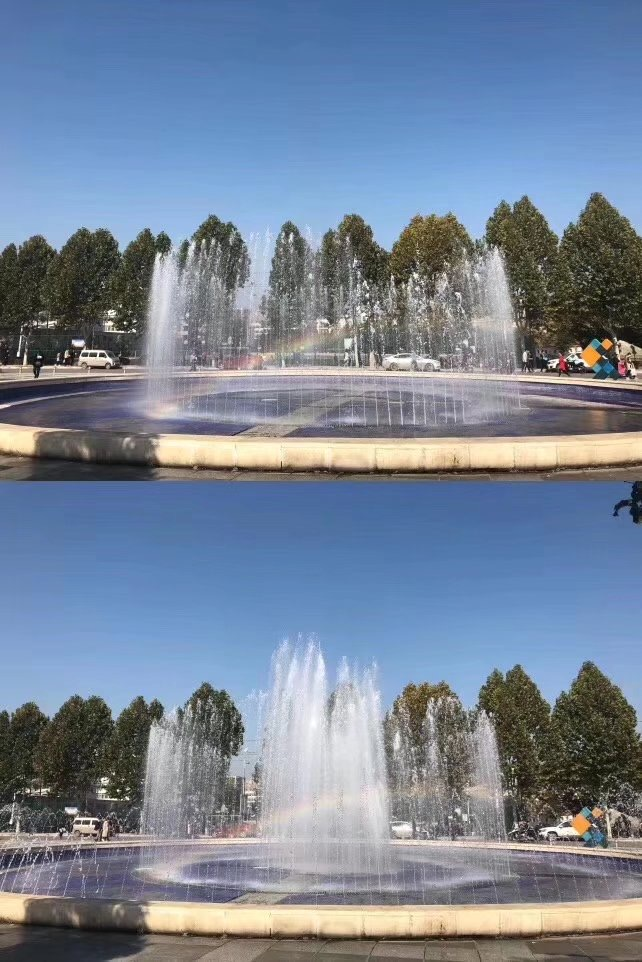
Fountain at the entrance of the academic lecture hall

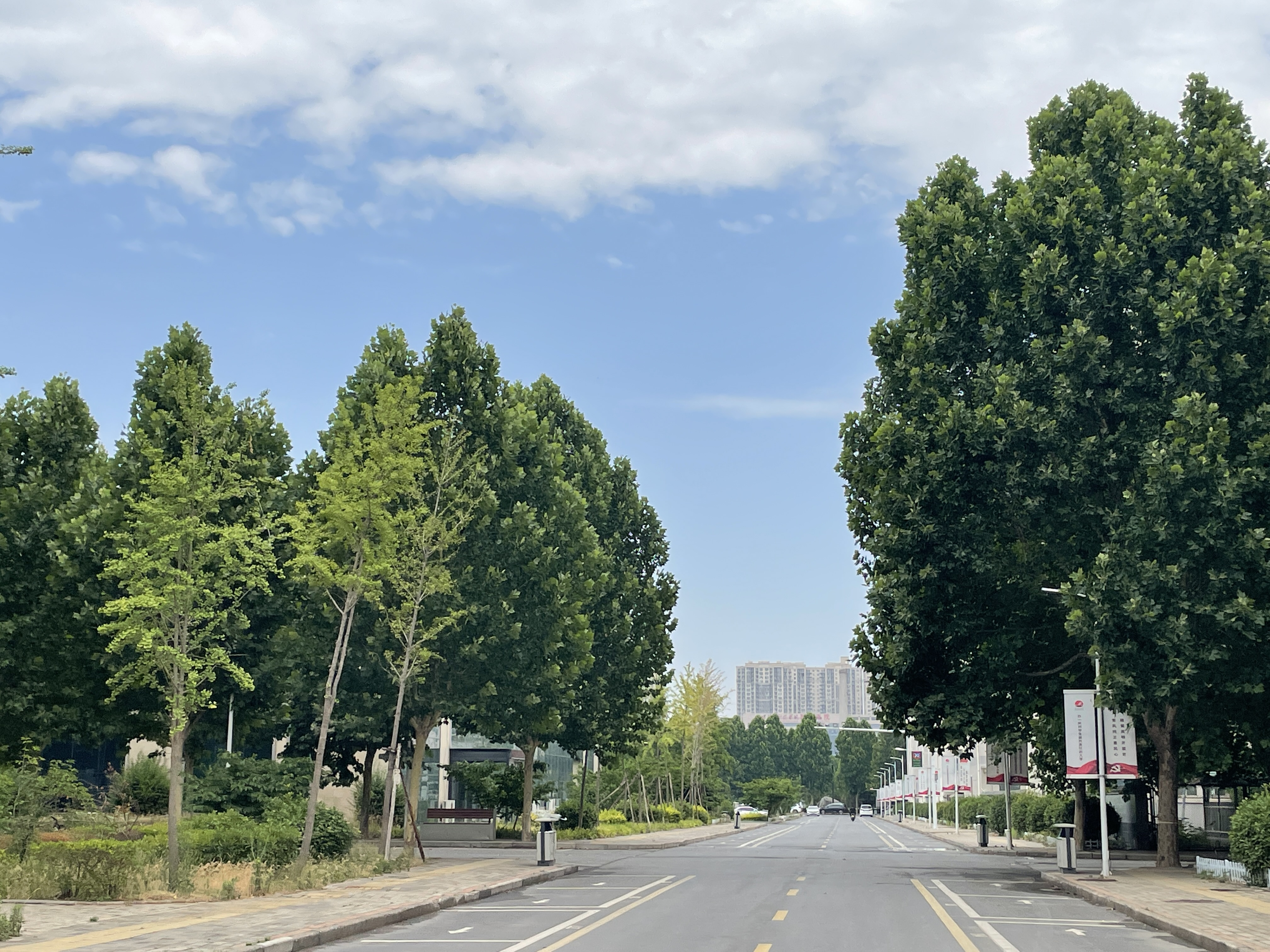
school main road Academic Hall

Science and Technology University (Chinese: 黄河科技学院; pinyin: Huánghé Kējì Xuéyuàn) is a private four-year university located in Zhengzhou, Henan, China. Founded in October 1984, undergraduate education was implemented in 2000.
