= Zhengzhou University of Light Industry =

University in Zhengzhou, China

Coordinates: 34.8139°N 113.5092°E

- 郑州轻工业大学
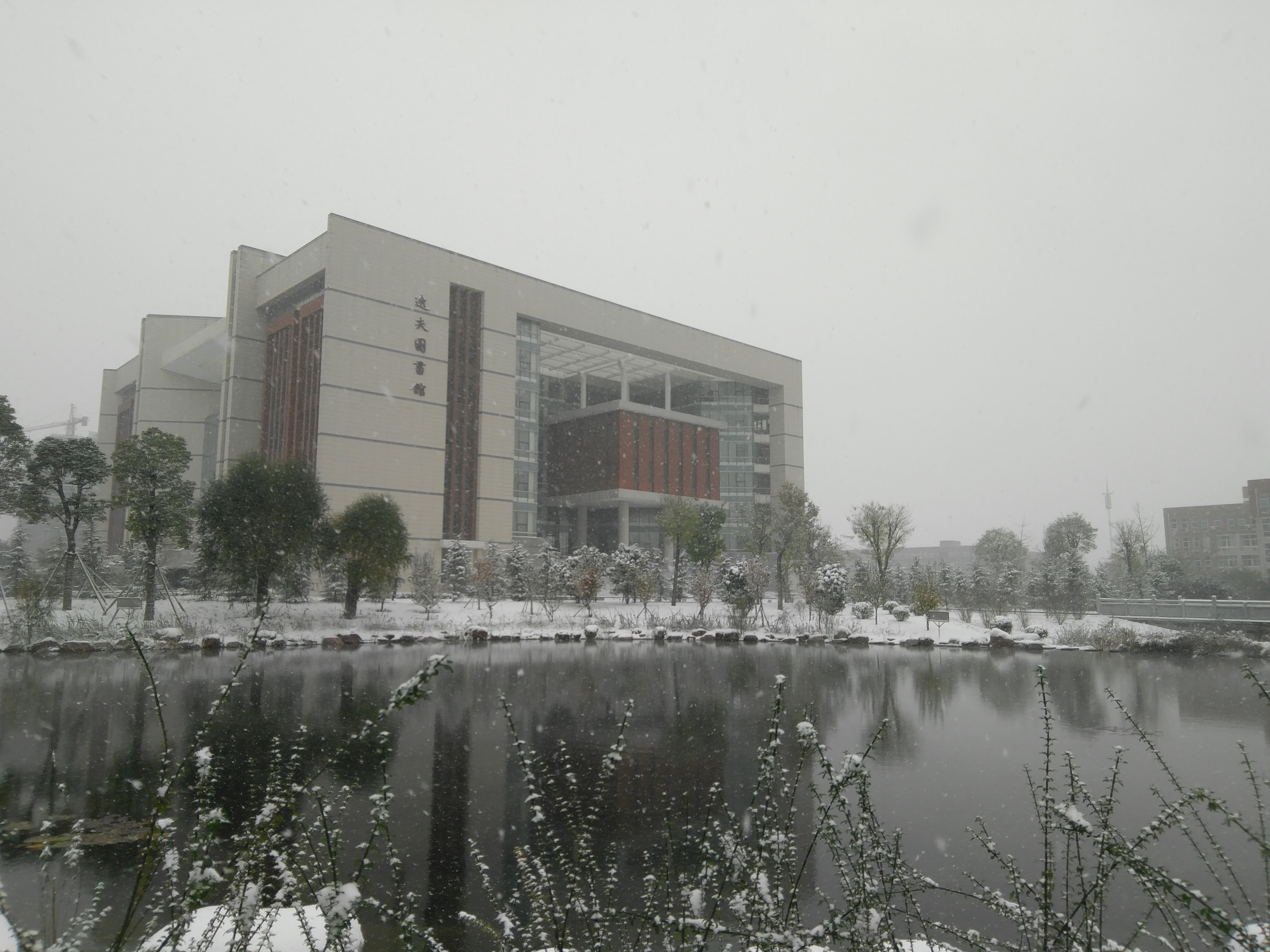
- Motto: (Chinese) 为之则易,不为则难
- Type: Public
- Established: 1977
- President: Zhao Weidong (赵卫东)
- Administrative staff: 1,700
- Students: 23,000
- Location: Zhengzhou, Henan, China
- Website: www.zzuli.edu.cn

Zhengzhou University of Light Industry (Chinese: 郑州轻工业大学; pinyin: Zhèngzhōu Qīnggōngyè Dàxué) is a public university located in Zhengzhou, Henan, People's Republic of China.

Founded in 1977, Zhengzhou University of Light Industry (ZZULI) was administered successively by the Ministry of Light Industry, the National Council of Light Industry, and the State Economic and Trade Commission until it was transferred to Henan Province as an institution co-administered by the central and local authorities in 1998. Presently it has evolved into a multi-disciplinary engineering focused university promoting coordinated development of other disciplines such as Sciences, Liberal arts, Economics, Management, Law and Pedagogy.

== Education and teaching ==
At present, ZZULI has secured a faculty of nearly 900, among whom over 400 are professors or associate professors, apart from a number of part-time professors. The University now offers 8 posts for provincial level Specially Employed Professors. Among the faculty members, more than 100 are entitled provincial Innovative Talents, Excellent Specialists, or Backbone Teachers.

== Disciplinary development and scientific research ==
In recent years, a large amount of special funds has been poured into the construction of the key disciplines. As a result, there have been established 22 provincial Key Disciplines, 3 provincial Key Laboratories, 1 Engineering and Technology Center of Henan universities and over 20 scientific research institutions such as the Bioengineering and Technology Center of Henan Province.

The University has assumed about 2,000 major scientific research projects including those of the National Natural Science Foundation and Social Science Foundation. Over 50 scientific research awards at the provincial or above level have been acquired such as the Second Prize of the National Scientific and Technological Progress. In addition, it owns 2 Scientific and Research Innovation Teams of Henan Province and 1 of Henan Universities. Adhering to the principle of integrating production, study and research into one, ZZULI is strengthening its cooperation with large national or local enterprises such as the Hongta Group, the Haier Group, the Midea Group and the Shenma Group. An agreement of production, study and research integration has been signed with the Xuchang municipal government.

The current departments running in this university are listed as below, they are:

Departments and schools
College of electric and information engineering
Mechanical and Electrical Engineering Institute
School of Food and Bioengineering
School of tobacco science and engineering
Department of Material and Chemical Engineering
School of Economics and Management
School of Economics and Management
school of computer and communication engineering
Department of Foreign Languages
School of political science And law
Mathematics and Information Science Department
Department of Technology and physics
International Education College
Software Engineering College
DEPARTMENT OF PHYSICAL EDUCATION
School of Continuing Education
Eastern International Art College
Light Industry Vocational College
Nationalities Vocational College
Center of Art Education
Ideological and Political Theory Course Teachingand Research Department

== International exchange and cooperation ==
ZZULI has developed cooperation with universities who are from the United States, Great Britain, Japan, Australia, Canada and Korea. Frequent academic exchanges have been made with foreign universities.
