= Senior High School Affiliated to Luoyang Institute of Science and Technology =

School in Luoyang, Henan, China

The Senior High School Affiliated to Luoyang Institute of Science and Technology (Chinese: 洛阳理工学院附属中学) is a public senior high school located in Luoyang, China. It was originally founded as "No.1 High School Attached to Luoyang Bearing Co., Ltd." in 1965, and moved to its current location in 2005. In 2008, the school was put under the administration of local education department. In 2015, Dongming Campus, the second campus of the school, began operating, on the site of former "LYC Staff University of Luoyang". By the end of 2017, the school has 62 classes with more than 3000 students and over 240 teachers.

== Characteristics ==
The school's motto is "Study Extensively, Discriminate Clearly, Reflect Carefully, Practice Earnestly" (Chinese: 博学 明辨 善思 笃行). Since 2014, the school has started a revolution over its in-class teaching pattern. After several years of trial, its new "1+4+2" teaching method has been popularized over the entire school. According to vice-principal Zhang Yanqi, under this new pattern, the students are not only listeners in class, but also have the opportunity to discuss their own ideas and instantly utilize the newly-learned knowledge. The students are no longer studying passively; instead, they actively preview, learn, discuss and review the class materials. The new pattern is expected to effectively improve the learning outcome as well as students' learning ability.

== Campus facility ==
The campus is equipped with comprehensive facilities to cater for students' basic need of living and studying:

- 2 teaching buildings (two more are under construction)
- 1 experiment building
- 1 standard sportground
- 1 dining hall
- 4 dormitory buildings
- 1 executive building
- 1 multi-functional stadium
- 1 parking garage

== Faculty ==
By the end of 2017, the school has 62 classes, with 3057 in-class students. Faculty staff members add up to 245, among whom there are:

- 73 senior teachers
- 1 special-grade teacher
- 2 city-level education experts
- 7 city-famous teachers
- 6 province-level head teachers
- 21 province-level core teachers
- 4 consultants at local education department
- 11 part-time researchers at local education department

== Celebrity graduates ==
- Zhai Shang (2010, Tsinghua University)
- Yang Zeyuan (2010, Tsinghua University)
- Wang Mengru (2012, Peking University)
- Guo Runchen (2014, Peking University)
- Liu Yutong (2014, Chinese University of Hong Kong)
- Zhu Jiayi (2015, Renmin University of China)
- Ma Anyuan (2015, Tsinghua University)
- Ji Ziyue (2015, University of the Chinese Academy of Sciences)
- Guo Shuyu (2016, Nankai University)
