= Shengda Economics, Trade and Management College of Zhengzhou =

Private college in Zhengzhou, China

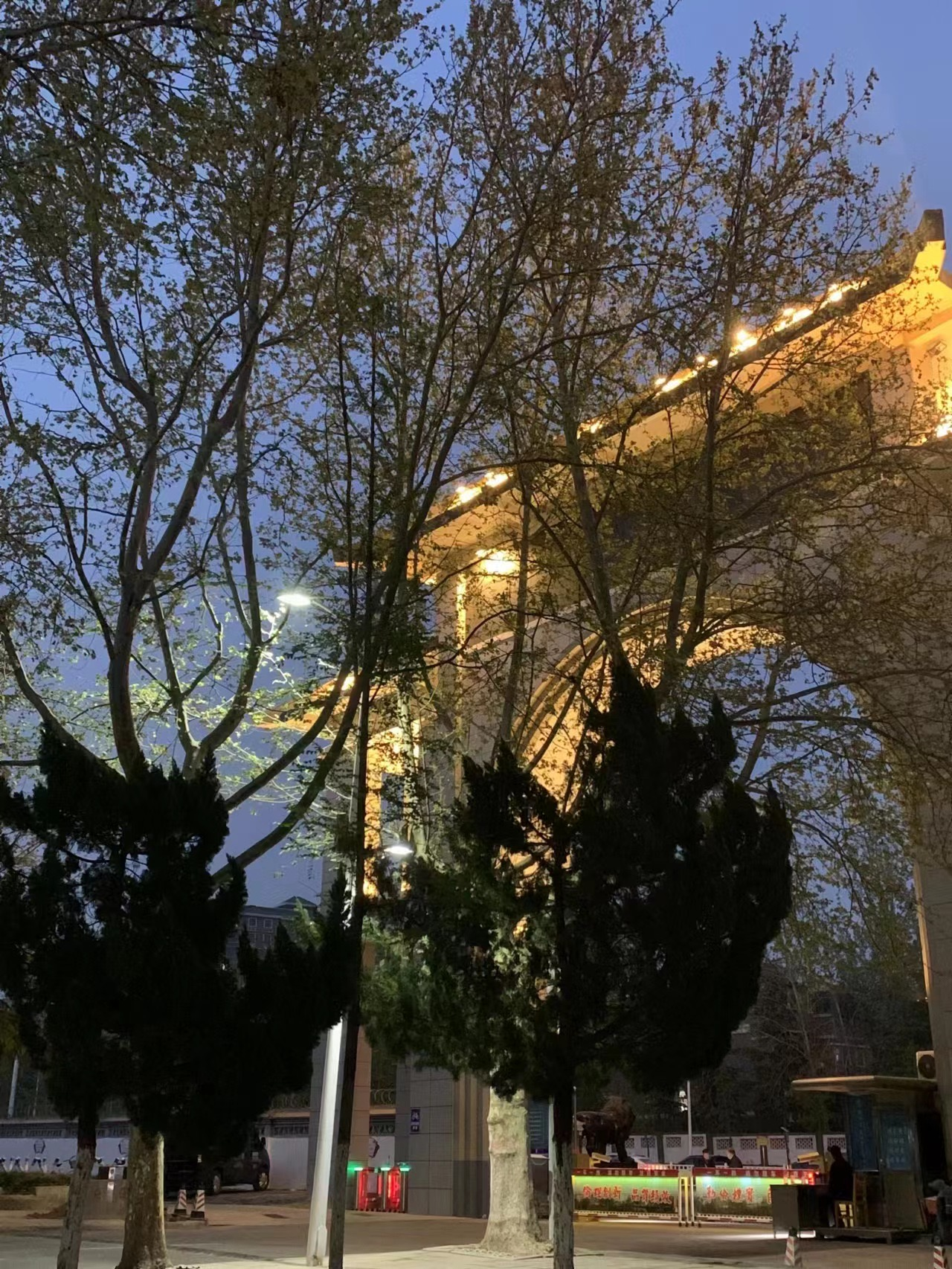
- Motto: 勤俭朴实、自力更生
- Motto in English: Industry, Thrift, Independence and Self-reliance
- Type: Private
- Established: 1994 (2011 removed the name prefix "Zhengzhou University")
- Founders: 王广亚 (Wang Guangya)
- Academic staff: 10 foreign teachers (2017)
- Students: ~25,000
- Location: Zhengzhou, Henan, China
- Website: shengda.edu.cn/en

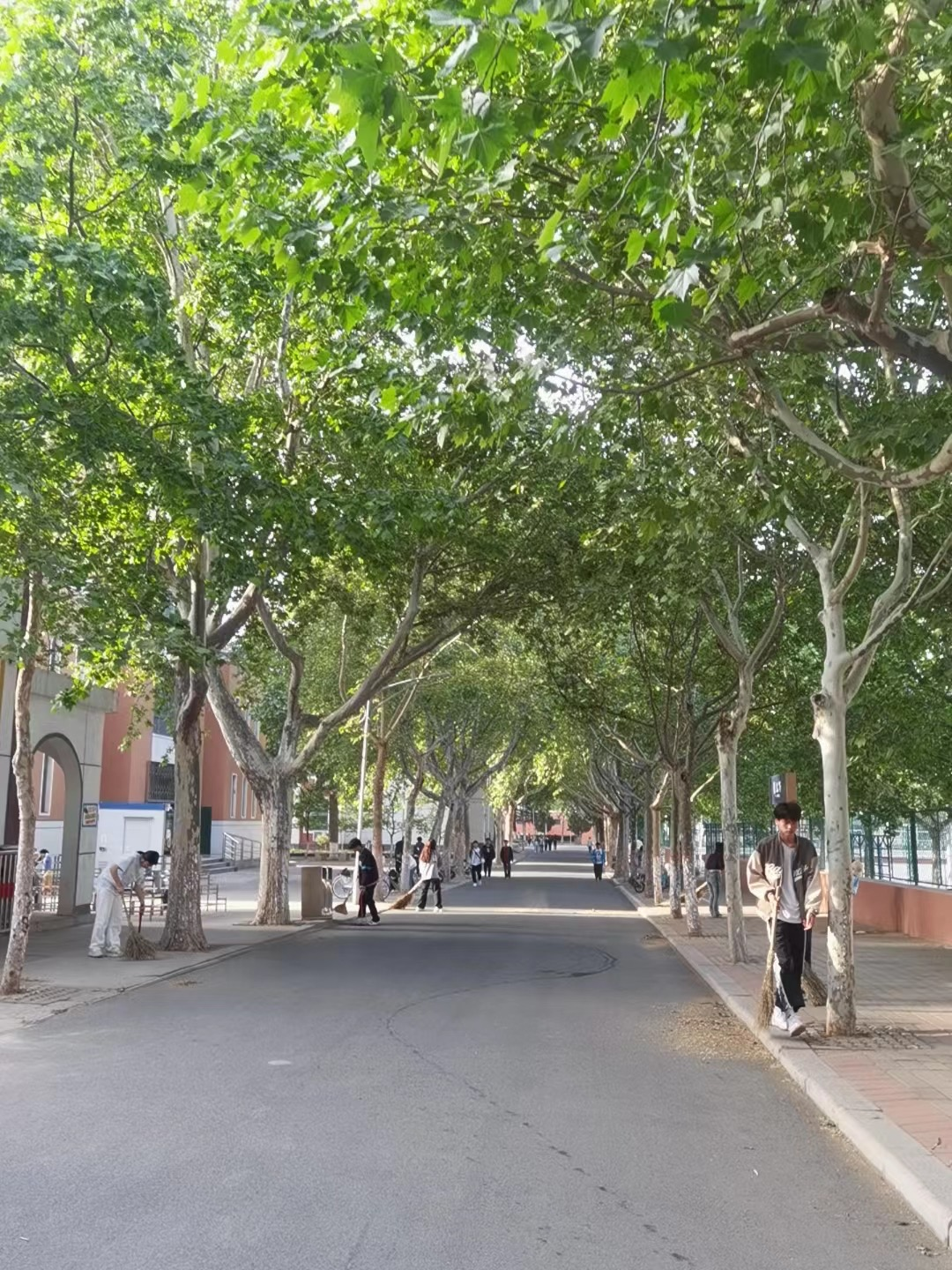
Campus interior

The Shengda Economics, Trade and Management College of Zhengzhou (Chinese: 郑州升达经贸管理学院), alternatively known as Zhengzhou Shengda University, is a private college in Zhengzhou, Henan, China.

== Controversies ==
Shengda College garnered international attention, when riots broke out among students on June 16, 2006. Students of the private college was convinced by the school that their diplomas would read "Zhengzhou University", a locally respected public university, without mention of "Shengda". Students of Shengda College, often unable to gain entry to Zhengzhou University, were willing to pay tuition of US$2500 per year as opposed to $500 for the public university under the promise of a diploma that only mentioned Zhengzhou University. However, regulations instituted in 2003 forced the school to include its own name and the diplomas received by the class of 2006 read "Zhengzhou University Shengda Economic, Trade and Management College". A 2006 The New York Times article stated that the reaction was one of the larger and more prolonged violent student demonstrations since the Tiananmen Square protests of 1989. As a result of the riot, the headmaster of the school resigned. The student reaction follows the steep rise in China of college graduates and tightening of the job market in the liberalizing economy.
