= Henan University of Chinese Medicine =

Public Medical School in Henan, China

- 河南中医药大学
- Type: Public
- Established: 1958; 68 years ago
- Affiliations: Midwestern Higher Education Revitalization Plan
- Students: 19,000
- Location: Zhengzhou, Henan, People's Republic of China; 34.7795°N 113.8058°E
- Campus: Urban
- Website: https://en.hactcm.edu.cn/

Chinese name
- Simplified Chinese: 河南中医药大学
- Traditional Chinese: 河南中醫藥大學
Transcriptions
Standard Mandarin
- Hanyu Pinyin: Hénán Zhōngyīyào Dàxué

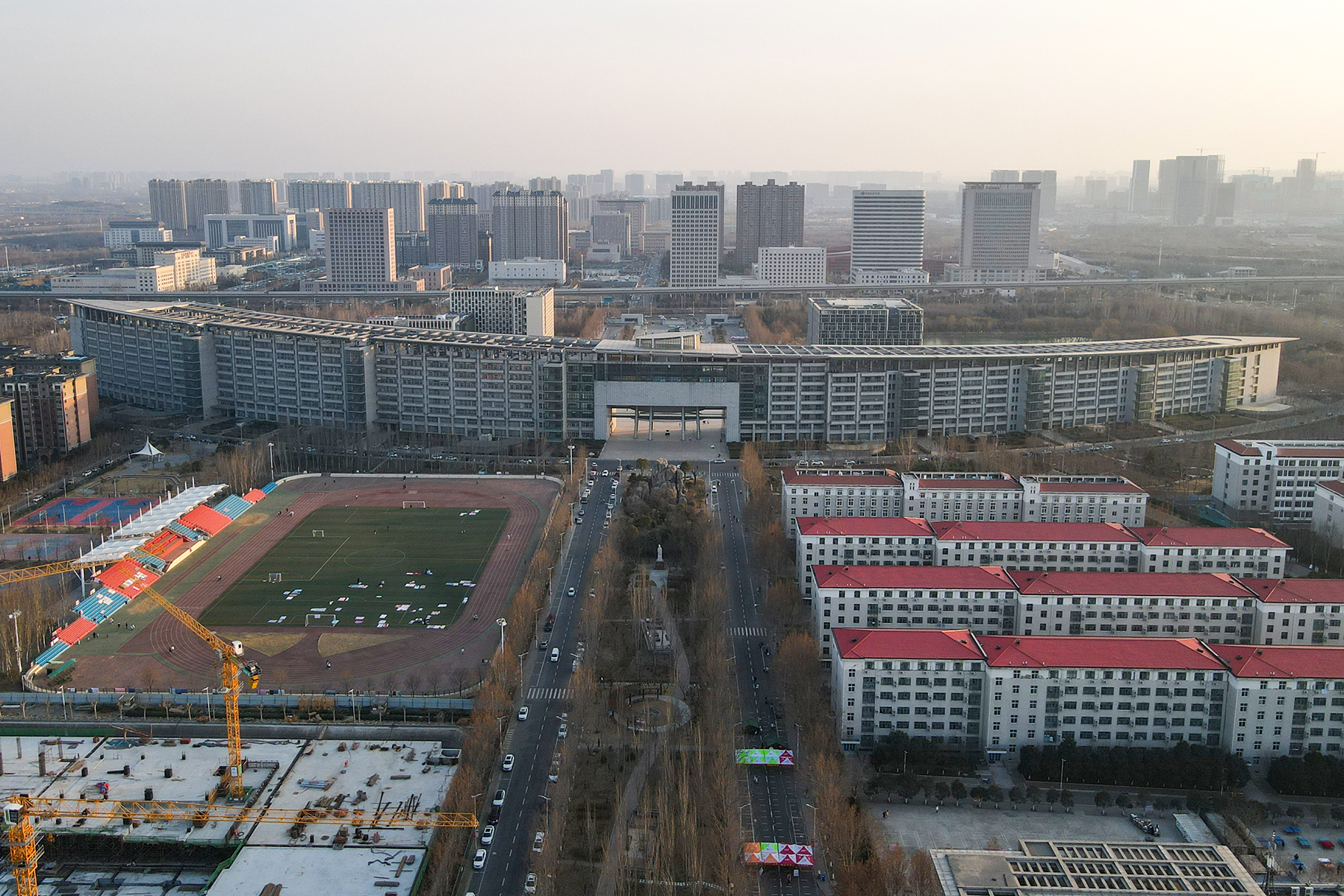
Henan University of Chinese Medicine

Henan University of Chinese Medicine (Chinese: 河南中医药大学; pinyin: Hénán Zhōngyīyào Dàxué) is a public university in Zhengzhou, Henan, China.

== History ==
One of the earliest of its kind in China, Henan University of Chinese Medicine was established in 1958. It was authorized by the State Academic Council to confer bachelor's and master's degrees, and to collaborate with other universities or colleges in enrolling doctorate students. It was approved by the Ministry of Education to enroll international students as well as students from Hong Kong, Macau, and Taiwan.

== Academics ==
The university offers bachelor's degrees in medicine, management, engineering science, and arts with 14 specialties as Chinese medicine, herbology, pharmaceutical engineering, acupuncture and tuina, integrated Chinese-Western medicine, and public management. It also offers master's degrees in 21 specialties, including Chinese internal medicine, Chinese pediatrics, herbal prescriptions, herbology, acupuncture and Tuina are the key programs of Henan Province.

The university faculty includes 15 doctoral tutors, 94 professors, 425 associate professors, 714 lecturers on campus, and 16 state-nominated and 10 province-nominated distinguished specialists.

There are over 10,000 students including over 150 international students.

== Facilities ==
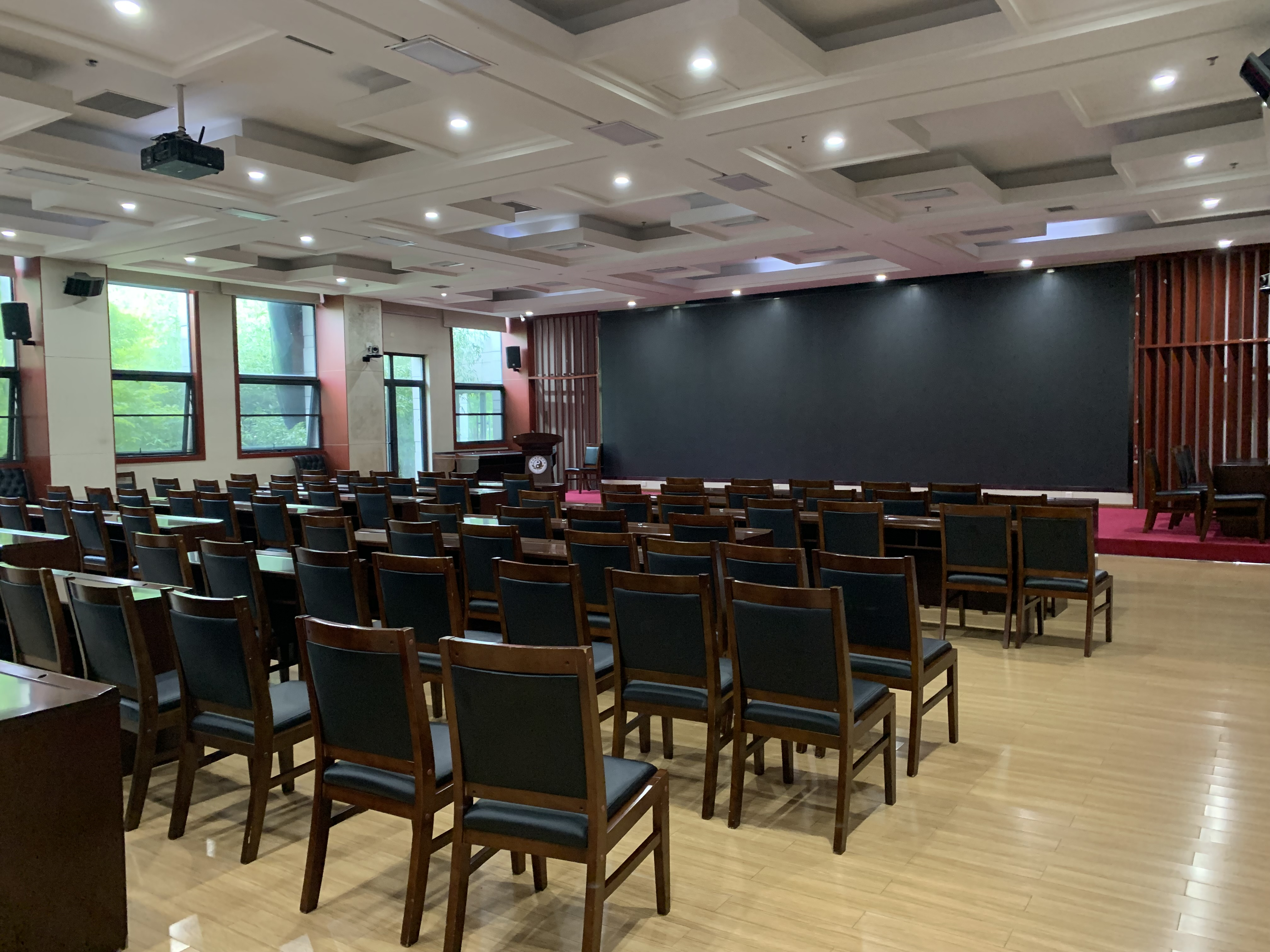
A lecture hall at the university.

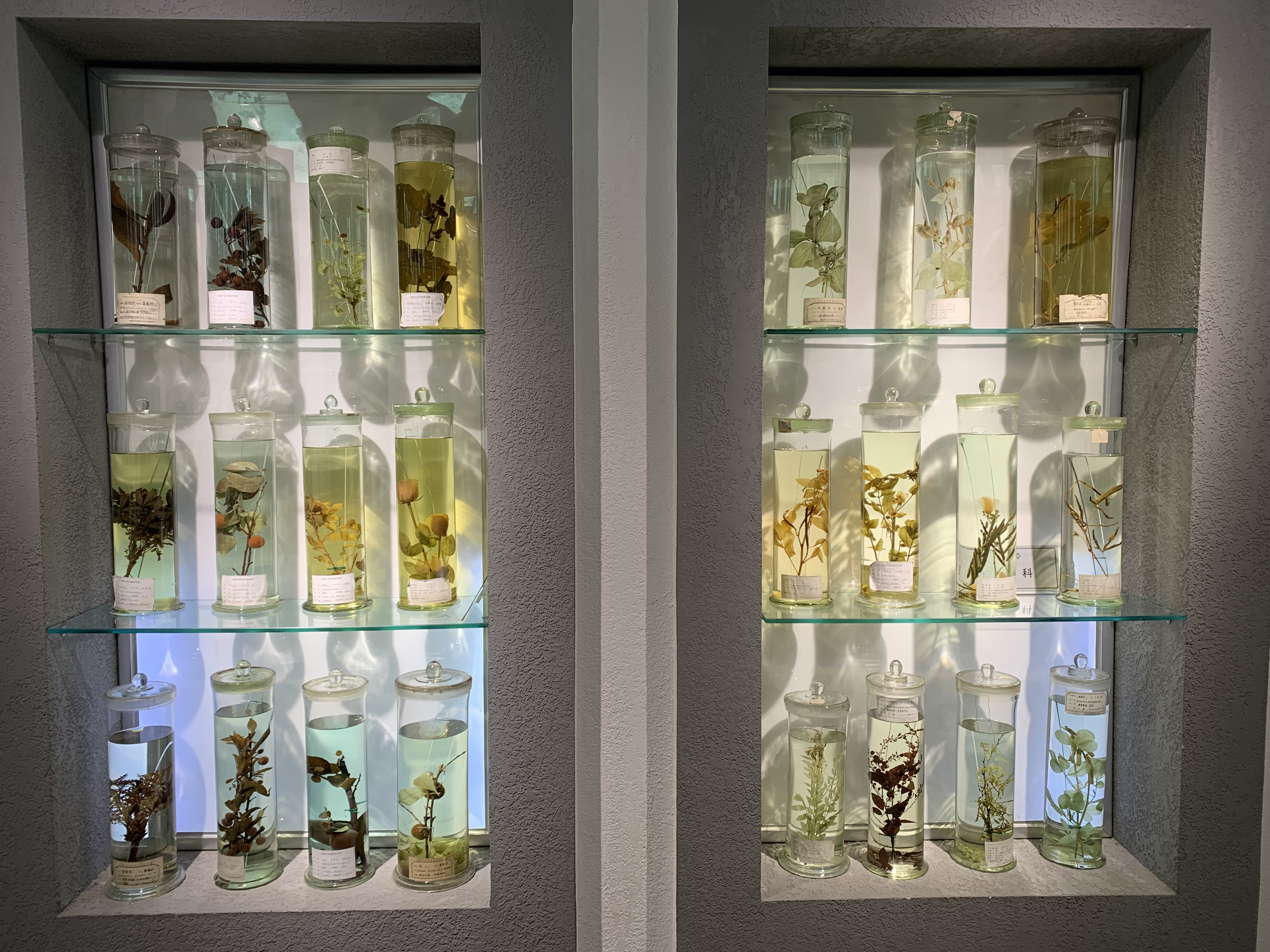
Herbs and other plants in a specimen room at the university.

It has 20 laboratories and three hospitals besides a central lab, an herbal plantation for quality control, a pharmaceutical factory, and specimen rooms. Institutions have been established in this university in the studies of Zhang Zhong-jing's theories, AIDS, hepatic diseases, gerontology, splenic and gastric diseases, pediatrics, rheumatoid arthritis, and ophthalmology.

The library has a collection of over 500,000 volumes and over 2,000 periodicals from home and abroad.

== See also ==
- First Affiliated Hospital of Henan University of Chinese Medicine
