= Wancheng, Nanyang =

Wancheng 宛城区
- District
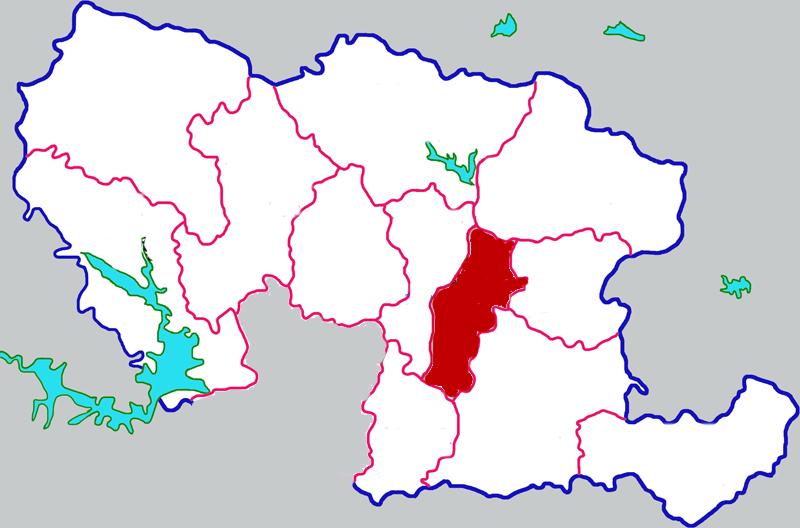
- Wancheng in Nanyang. Note the map does not include the sub-prefecture-level city of Dengzhou.

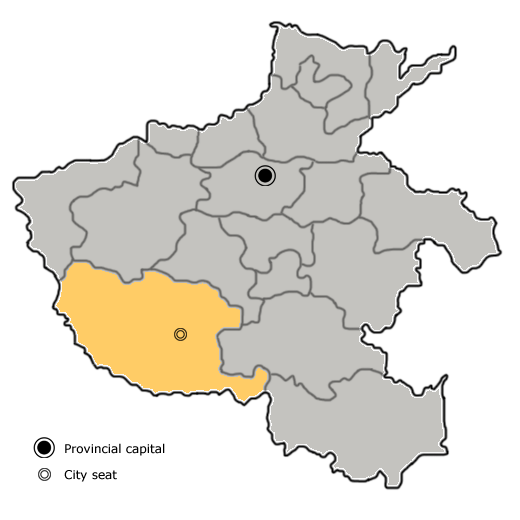
- Nanyang in Henan
- Coordinates: 33°00′14″N 112°32′23″E
- Country: People's Republic of China
- Province: Henan
- Prefecture-level city: Nanyang

Area
  - Total: 880 km^{2} (340 sq mi)

Population (2019)
  - Total: 938,200
  - Density: 1,100/km^{2} (2,800/sq mi)
- Time zone: UTC+8 (China Standard)
- Postal code: 473000
- Website: http://www.wancheng.gov.cn/

Wancheng District (simplified Chinese: 宛城区; traditional Chinese: 宛城區; pinyin: Wǎnchéng Qū) is one of two districts of the city of Nanyang, in the southwest of Henan province, People's Republic of China.

== Administrative divisions ==
As of 2012, this district is divided to 6 subdistricts, 4 towns and 6 townships.

Subdistricts

- Dongguan Subdistrict (东关街道)
- Xinhua Subdistrict (新华街道)
- Hanye Subdistrict (汉冶街道)
- Zhongjing Subdistrict (仲景街道)
- Baihe Subdistrict (白河街道)
- Zaolin Subdistrict (枣林街道)

Towns

- Guanzhuang (官庄镇)
- Wadian (瓦店镇)
- Hongniwan (红泥湾镇)
- Huangtaigang (黄台岗镇)

Townships

- Lihe Township (溧河乡)
- Hanzhong Township (汉冢乡)
- Jinhua Township (金华乡)
- Cha'an Township (茶庵乡)
- Gaomiao Township (高庙乡)
- Xindian Township (新店乡)

== Education ==
=== Higher education ===
- Nanyang Institute of Technology (南陽理工學院)
- Henan Polytechnic Institute (河南工業職業技術學院)

== See also ==
- Expressways of Henan
- China National Highways
- Expressways of China
- Henan
- Wolong District
- Nanyang, Henan
