= Nanyang Medical College =

University in Nanyang, Henan, China

- 南陽醫學高等專科學校 (Chinese)
- Other name: 南阳医专
- Former name: 南阳卫校
- Established: 1951
- Location: Nanyang, Henan, China; 32°58′08″N 112°29′24″E
- Campus: 877,333.333 m^{2} (0.338740294 sq mi)
- Website: www.nymc.edu.cn

Chinese name
- Traditional Chinese: 南陽醫學高等專科學校
- Simplified Chinese: 南阳医学高等专科学校
Transcriptions
Standard Mandarin
- Hanyu Pinyin: Nányáng yīxué gāoděng zhuānkē xuéxiào

The predecessor of Nanyang Medical College was the Nanyang Health College founded in 1951. In 2004, it was approved by the Ministry of Education to be upgraded to Nanyang Medical College. In 2006, the Nanyang Municipal Party Committee and Municipal Government integrated the Nanyang Medical Education Resources, and merged Nanyang Chinese Medicine School with Zhang Zhongjing University of Traditional Chinese Medicine into Nanyang Medical College.

The college covers an area of 1,316 mu, the school building area is 449,200 square meters; the total value of teaching and research equipment is 133 million yuan; the total library collection is 1.733 million, including 1.23 million paper books and 520,000 electronic books. More than 1,300 foreign language periodicals. There are 20 party and government groups, 14 teaching departments (departments, institutes) and 6 teaching and auxiliary institutions. It has 18 majors in clinical medicine, nursing, Chinese medicine, pharmacy, etc.

The college has 840 full-time teachers, including: 363 senior professional and technical positions (103 high), 414 master's degree teachers (including 12 doctorates), and 6 foreign cultural and educational experts. Five people were employed as masters and doctoral supervisors in universities. There are 340 "double-type" teachers, accounting for 40.5% of full-time teachers.
