= Nanyang, Henan =

Nanyang 南阳市
- Prefecture-level city
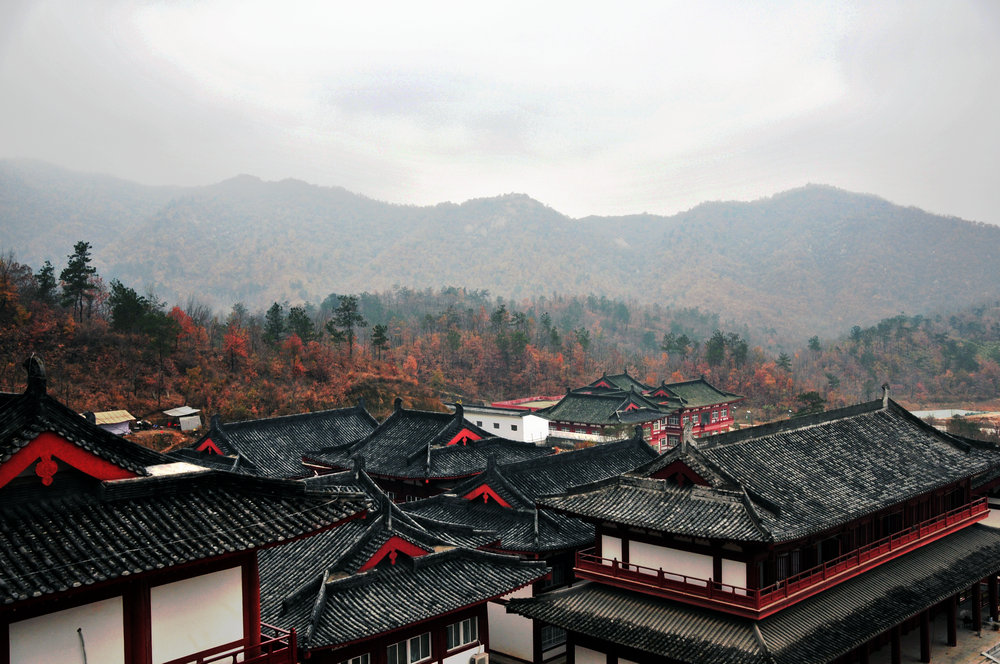
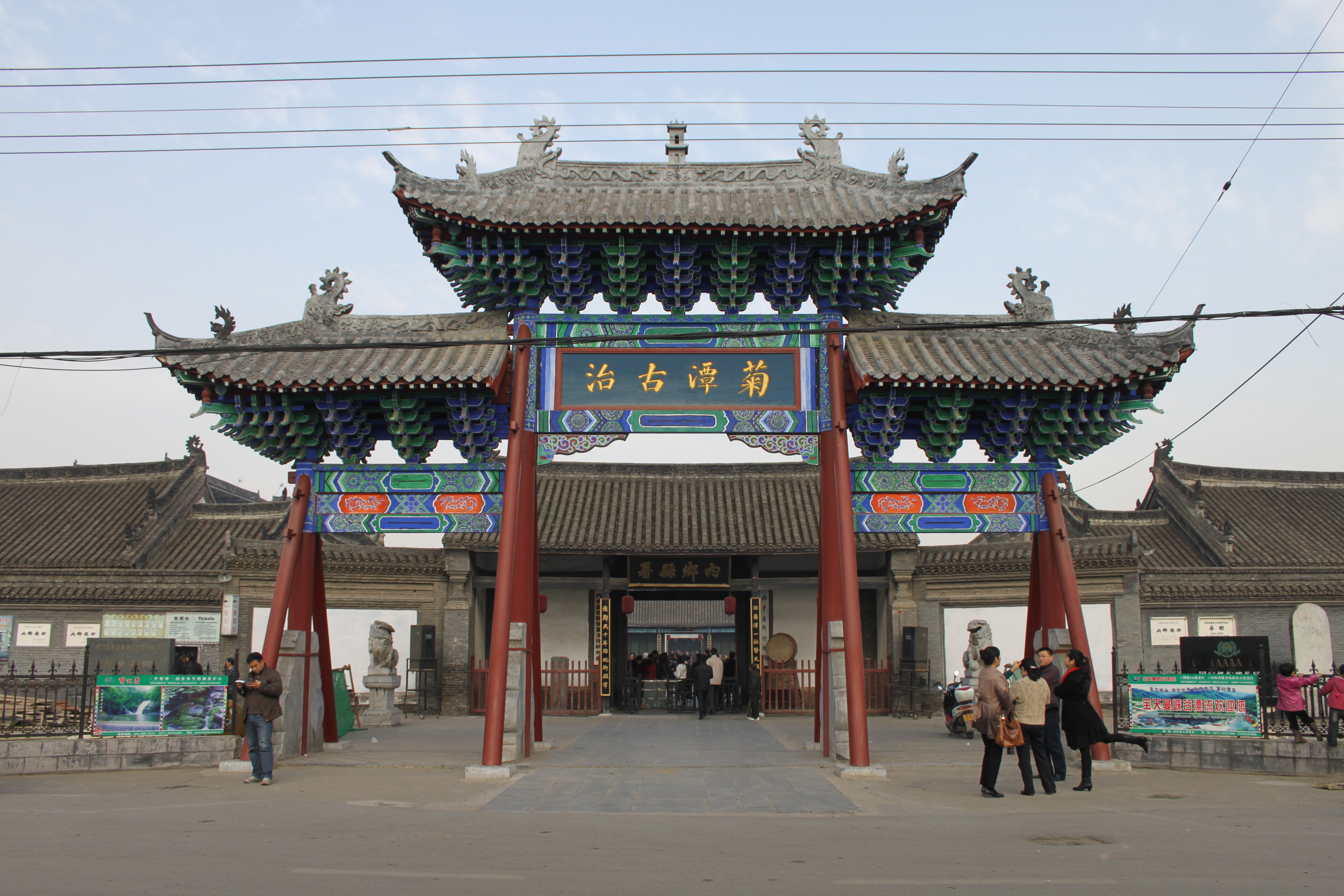
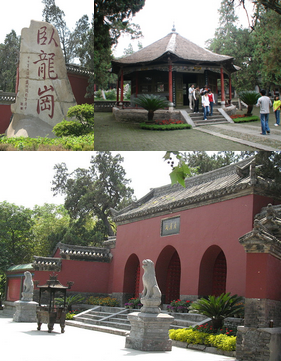
- Nickname: Wan (宛)
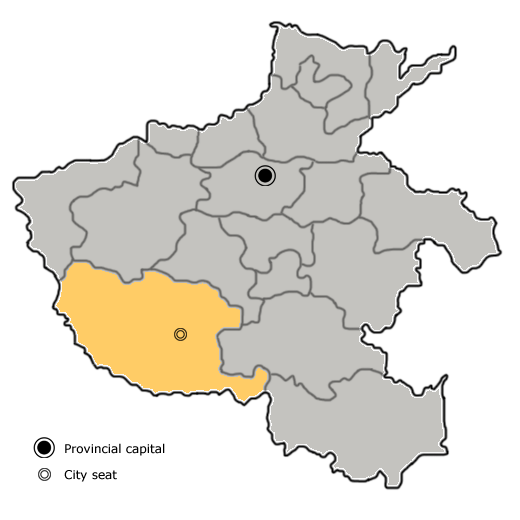
- Nanyang City in Henan

- Location on the North China Plain Nanyang (China)
- Coordinates (Nanyang municipal government): 33°01′05″N 112°34′43″E
- Country: People's Republic of China
- Province: Henan
- County-level divisions: 2 districts 10 counties
- Municipal seat: Wolong District

Government
  - Type: Prefecture-level city
  - Body: Nanyang Municipal People's Congress
  - Party Secretary: Wang Zhihui
  - Congress Chairman: Zhang Shengqi
  - Mayor: Liu Bing
  - CPPCC Chairman: Zhang Fuzhi

Area
  - Prefecture-level city: 26,591 km^{2} (10,267 sq mi)
  - Urban: 1,988 km^{2} (768 sq mi)
  - Rural: 24,521 km^{2} (9,468 sq mi)
  - Metro: 1,988 km^{2} (768 sq mi)

Dimensions
  - Length: 263 km (163 mi)
  - Width: 168 km (104 mi)
- Elevation: 131 m (430 ft)
- Highest elevation: 2,212.5 m (7,259 ft)
- Lowest elevation: 72.2 m (237 ft)

Population (2020 census)
  - Prefecture-level city: 9,713,112
  - Density: 365.28/km^{2} (946.07/sq mi)
  - Urban: 2,085,680
  - Urban density: 1,049/km^{2} (2,717/sq mi)
  - Rural: 7,627,432
  - Rural density: 311.06/km^{2} (805.63/sq mi)
  - Metro: 2,085,680
  - Metro density: 1,049/km^{2} (2,717/sq mi)

GDP
  - Prefecture-level city: CN¥ 311.5 billion US$ 46.9 billion
  - Per capita: CN¥ 31,010; US$ 4,669
- Time zone: UTC+8 (China Standard)
- Postal code: 473000
- Area code: 0377
- ISO 3166 code: CN-HA-13
- Major Nationalities: Han
- License plate prefixes: 豫R
- Maidenhead locator or QTH grid square: OM62GX - OM63GA
- City Flowers: Chrysanthemum&China Rose
- Website: www.nanyang.gov.cn

Nanyang is a prefecture-level city in the southwest of Henan province, China. The city with the largest administrative area in Henan, Nanyang borders Xinyang to the southeast, Zhumadian to the east, Pingdingshan to the northeast, Luoyang to the north, Sanmenxia to the northwest, the province of Shaanxi to the west, and the province of Hubei to the south.

Nanyang was the home of various important figures in Chinese history. It nurtured the "sage of science" Zhang Heng, "sage of medicine" Zhang Zhongjing, "sage of commerce" Fan Li, and "sage of intelligence" Zhuge Liang. It has also been home to contemporary celebrities such as philosopher Feng Youlan, military strategist Peng Xuefeng, novelist Yao Xueyin, inventor Wang Yongmin, and writer Er Yuehe.

== Names ==
In the name "Nanyang" (simplified Chinese: 南阳; traditional Chinese: 南陽; pinyin: Nányáng), Nan (南) means south, and Yang (阳/陽) means sun—the south side of a mountain, or the north side of a river, in Chinese is called Yang. The name came from Nanyang Commandery, a commandery established in the region during the Warring States period. Before the name "Nanyang" became associated with the city itself, it was referred to as "Wan" (宛). Nanyang, also known as Wan, Nandu, and Dixiang.

== History ==
550,000 years ago, Nanzhao Man (Homo Erectus) inhabited near Xinghuashan, Nanzhao. Between 5,000 BCE and 3,000 BCE, a substantial Neolithic settlement thrived in Huangshan, situated north of Nanyang. Excavations of the Huangshan ruins have uncovered remnants of jade workshops, high-level tombs, wharves, and granaries. The Huangshan Archeological Site provided insight into the formation of Chinese civilization. The Baliqiao site in Fangcheng County is a core settlement of the Erlitou culture. It served as an important hub for the transfer and control of resources. Nanyang was the capital of the state of Shen in the first millennium BCE. After the unification of the six states by Qin, the "relocation of unruly people to Nanyang" brought together the wealthy and skilled merchants and artisans of the six states, promoting the development of Nanyang's economy, especially the iron smelting industry, which became one of the national iron smelting centers. It became commercially important under the Han dynasty, as it had many iron foundries and other manufacturing sites, and also fell at the convergence of routes between major cities. It's an important city of the Silk Road. Emperor Gengshi's enthronement took place on the banks of the Bai River in Nanyang. Later, with the help of the 28 generals of the Cloud Terrace and the financial support of Nanyang, Liu Xiu successfully ascended to power and established the Eastern Han dynasty. Nanyang became the southern capital, ranking as the second largest city after Luoyang, the capital. During that time, Nanyang was home to numerous influential families. Nanyang subsequently declined somewhat in importance, but remained a political and cultural center of southwestern Henan province and a hub for trade.

== Geography ==
Nanyang is located in southwestern Henan, bordering Hubei (Xiangyang, Shiyan, and Suizhou) to the south, Shaanxi (Shangluo) to the west and the following prefecture-level cities in Henan:

- Zhumadian (E)
- Xinyang (SE)
- Sanmenxia (NW)
- Luoyang (N)
- Pingdingshan (NE)

The latitude of the entire prefecture ranges from 32° 17' to 33° 48' N, while the longitude ranges from 110° 58' to 113° 49' E, and the prefecture spans 26,600 square kilometres (10,300 sq mi). The city lies within the Nanyang Basin, which is part of a region in Central China that lies in the gap between the eastern end of the Qin Mountains and the source of the Huai River. Thus, using those two geographic features as the standard dividing line, it is difficult to classify the city into northern or southern China.

To the north of Nanyang city proper, there is a mountain called Mount Du, which is famous for the Dushan jade, one of the four famous jades of China, now a rarity. To the southwest is Neixiang County with the newly developing Baotianman Biosphere Reserve—an area of high biodiversity, with 65 rare and endangered species.

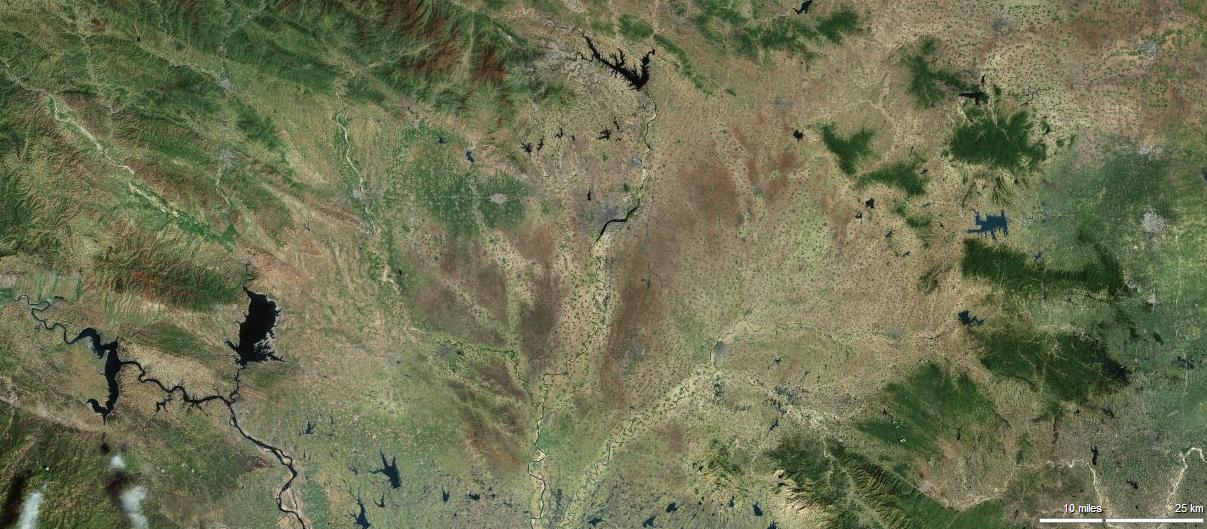
Satellite view of the area, showing the Nanyang Basin in the centre. The city proper of Nanyang is located in the north-central part of this picture.

=== Climate ===
The climate is generally moderate and is a four-season humid subtropical climate (Köppen Cwa), with strong monsoon influences: winters are cool but dry, and summers are hot and humid. Spring and autumn provide transitions of reasonable length. The monthly daily average temperature in January is 1.6 °C (34.9 °F) and in July it is 27.0 °C (80.6 °F); the annual mean is 15.2 °C (59.4 °F). More than half the annual rainfall occurs from June to August.Winter lasts for 110–135 days, followed by summer for 110–120 days, and spring and autumn for 55–70 days.

Climate data for Nanyang, elevation 181 m (594 ft), (1991–2020 normals, extremes 1971–present)
Month	Jan	Feb	Mar	Apr	May	Jun	Jul	Aug	Sep	Oct	Nov	Dec	Year
Record high °C (°F)	20.5 (68.9)	22.8 (73.0)	31.9 (89.4)	34.4 (93.9)	38.9 (102.0)	41.4 (106.5)	39.7 (103.5)	40.3 (104.5)	39.0 (102.2)	33.0 (91.4)	28.5 (83.3)	21.4 (70.5)	41.4 (106.5)
Mean daily maximum °C (°F)	6.7 (44.1)	10.4 (50.7)	15.5 (59.9)	22.0 (71.6)	27.4 (81.3)	31.1 (88.0)	31.8 (89.2)	30.9 (87.6)	27.0 (80.6)	22.0 (71.6)	15.0 (59.0)	8.9 (48.0)	20.7 (69.3)
Daily mean °C (°F)	1.8 (35.2)	5.0 (41.0)	10.1 (50.2)	16.4 (61.5)	21.8 (71.2)	25.9 (78.6)	27.4 (81.3)	26.4 (79.5)	22.0 (71.6)	16.5 (61.7)	9.6 (49.3)	3.8 (38.8)	15.6 (60.0)
Mean daily minimum °C (°F)	−1.9 (28.6)	0.7 (33.3)	5.5 (41.9)	11.3 (52.3)	16.6 (61.9)	21.2 (70.2)	23.8 (74.8)	22.9 (73.2)	18.1 (64.6)	12.2 (54.0)	5.5 (41.9)	−0.1 (31.8)	11.3 (52.4)
Record low °C (°F)	−13.5 (7.7)	−13.9 (7.0)	−6.5 (20.3)	−0.4 (31.3)	5.0 (41.0)	11.8 (53.2)	15.7 (60.3)	14.0 (57.2)	7.9 (46.2)	−1.2 (29.8)	−6.2 (20.8)	−17.5 (0.5)	−17.5 (0.5)
Average precipitation mm (inches)	13.0 (0.51)	14.9 (0.59)	31.3 (1.23)	47.8 (1.88)	81.9 (3.22)	119.8 (4.72)	181.4 (7.14)	128.3 (5.05)	78.2 (3.08)	50.0 (1.97)	34.7 (1.37)	11.2 (0.44)	792.5 (31.2)
Average precipitation days (≥ 0.1 mm)	4.5	5.8	7.2	7.4	8.7	9.4	11.7	10.8	9.3	8.0	6.7	4.3	93.8
Average snowy days	4.3	3.2	1.2	0	0	0	0	0	0	0	1.0	2.6	12.3
Average relative humidity (%)	67	66	66	67	65	68	78	78	75	71	72	68	70
Mean monthly sunshine hours	100.2	114.5	148.3	179.2	183.5	168.7	170.7	177.2	144.3	142.0	122.5	114.7	1,765.8
Percentage possible sunshine	32	37	40	46	43	39	39	43	39	41	39	37	40
Source 1: China Meteorological AdministrationNOAA
Source 2: Weather China

== Demographics ==
The whole city area has a population over 10.26 million, which is the twelfth prefecture-level city in China now. The built-up area has over 1.8 million people, which is the fifth largest city in Henan Province. About 1 million commute from the city, mainly to Zhengzhou, Guangdong province, Beijing and Shanghai. The majority of the province is Han; among the minority nationalities are the Hui people and Man people.

=== Population ===
As of the 2020 Chinese census, Nanyang was home to 9,713,112 people, ranking nineteenth in China, and its built-up (or metro) area made of Wolong and Wancheng Districts was home to 2,085,680 people.

=== Ethnic groups ===
In 2022, Nanyang City has 49 ethnic minority groups with a population of 288000. The distribution of ethnic minorities shows the characteristics of "large dispersion and small mixed residence", among which the Hui ethnic group has 163800 people, distributed in Wancheng District, Dengzhou City, Zhenping County and other places; There are 72600 Mongolian people, distributed in Zhenping County, Neixiang County and other places; There are 28600 Manchu people, distributed in Nanzhao County, Xichuan County and other places.

=== Education ===
==== Primary education ====
- Nanyang No.22 Middle School
- Nanyang No.13 Middle School
- Nanyang Experimental School

==== Secondary education ====
- No.1 High school of Nanyang (南阳市一中)
- No.2 High School of Nanyang
- No.5 High School of Nanyang
- No.8 High School of Nanyang

==== Library ====
- Nanyang Library (南阳市图书馆)

==== Higher education ====
- Nanyang Institute of Technology
- Nanyang Normal University
- Nanyang Medical College
- Henan Polytechnic Institute (河南工业职业技术学院)
- Nanyang Vocational College of Agriculture (南阳农业职业学院)

== Administration ==
The prefecture-level city of Nanyang administers 2 districts, 1 county-level city and 10 counties.

- Wolong District
- Wancheng District
- Dengzhou City
- Xinye County
- Sheqi County
- Tanghe County
- Tongbai County
- Fangcheng County
- Nanzhao County
- Zhenping County
- Neixiang County
- Xixia County
- Xichuan County

Map
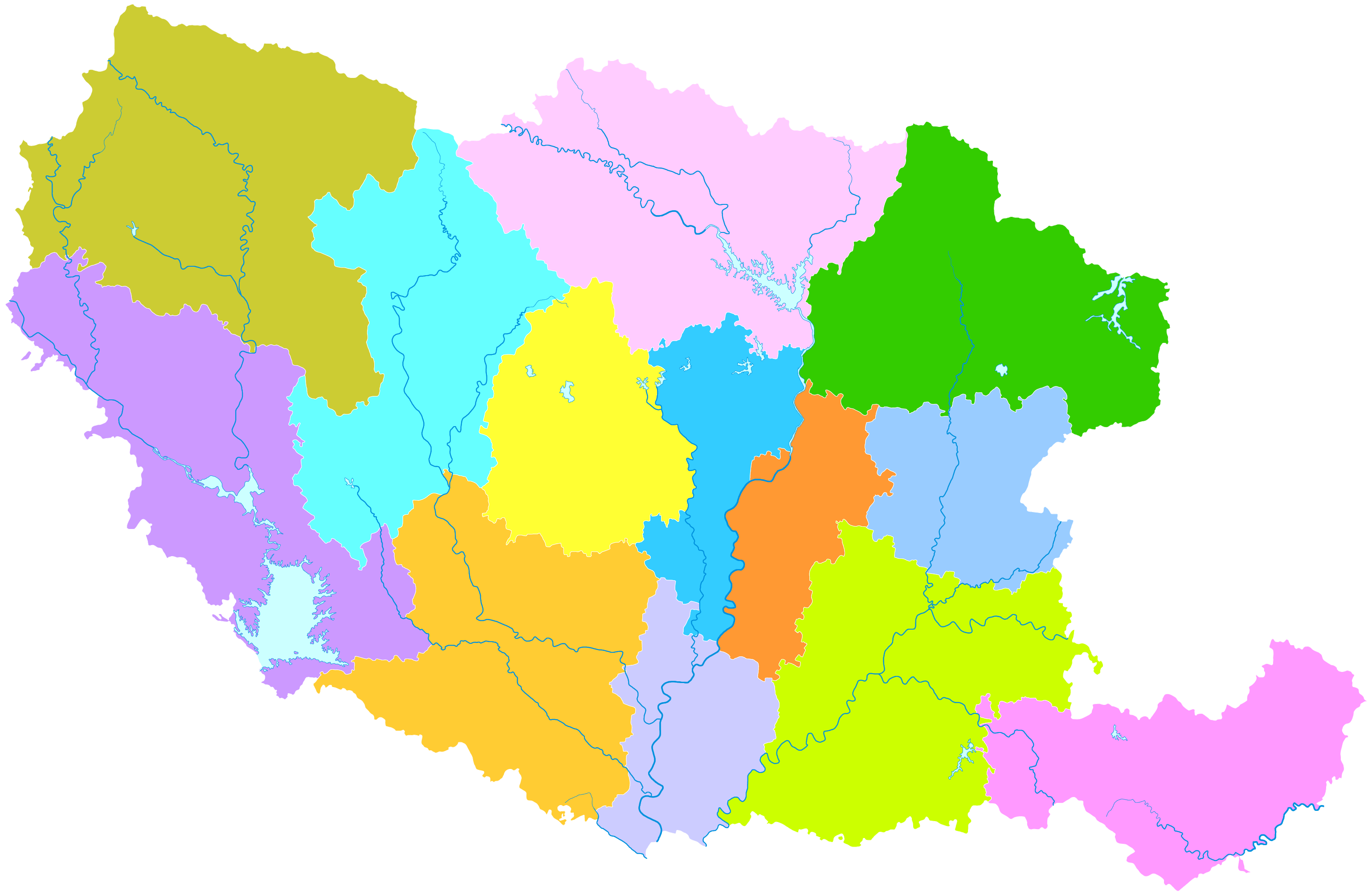

== Economy ==
- Nanyang has a developing cattle industry, as well as a tobacco factory.
- The Bai River flows through Nanyang and provides it with an abundant supply of fish.
- Nanyang produces two kinds of quality wine: Shedianlaojiu and Wolongyuye.
- Nanyang oil field is the second largest oil field in Henan Province.
- Agriculture plays an important role in its economy.
- There is a large optical component production community in the area comprising several factories.

The Nanyang Municipal Government has established a development goal of focusing on industrial expansion, prioritizing the development of a regional manufacturing centre and an innovative manufacturing industry.

== Sports ==
Nanyang has three main sports centers. Among them, the Nanyang First Sports and Fitness Center is the home of the Henan Golden Elephants.

== Infrastructure ==
=== Transport ===
==== Railways ====
Nanyang is served by the following rail lines: Nanjing-Xi'an Railway, Jiaozuo-Liuzhou Railway, Haoji Railway, and Zhengzhou–Wanzhou high-speed railway.

Nanyang has three major railway stations: Nanyang railway station, Nanyang East railway station, and Nanyang West railway station. There are also several other small stations serving suburban areas. Direct train service is available to Beijing, Shenyang, and Harbin to the north; Shanghai, Nanjing, and Hangzhou to the east; Xining, Lanzhou, and Ürümqi to the west; and Guangzhou, Xiamen, Nanning, and Kunming to the south.

==== Highways and expressways ====
As of 2023, Nanyang has 898 km expressway, ranking the longest in Henan Province. The expressway is an important part of Nanyang's "One cross, three rings, and six radiations" plan.

===== China National Highway =====
- China National Highway 207
- China National Highway 234
- China National Highway 311
- China National Highway 312

===== China National Expressway =====
- G40 Shanghai–Xi'an Expressway
- G55 Erenhot–Guangzhou Expressway
- G0421 Xuchang–Guangzhou Expressway

===== Henan Provincial Expressways =====
- S81 Shangqiu–Nanyang Expressway
- S83 Lankao–Nanyang Expressway
- S98 Neixiang–Dengzhou Expressway

==== Airport and airlines ====
Nanyang Jiangying Airport is a civil aviation airport. It's 20 minutes from the urban area. Passengers can take flights to and from Beijing, Shanghai, Guangzhou, Shenzhen, and Guilin.

There are also two avion airports.

==== Water ====
Tanghe to Madian waterway is under construction; the project is expected to be completed by the end of 2024.

==== Public transit ====
Nanyang Public Transportation Corporation has 1,005 buses (97.8% are clean energy buses), 44 bus lines (859.8 km), and 1,050 stations.

As of 2023, a total of 1,500 taxis were in operation in Nanyang; all of them run on natural gas. In addition, there are more than 1,790 app-taxis and 35.98% of them are powered by renewable energy.

Dockless app based bikeshares such as DiDi Bike and Hellobike are also available.

Nanyang has planned six light rail lines with a total track mileage of 134 km.

== Culture ==
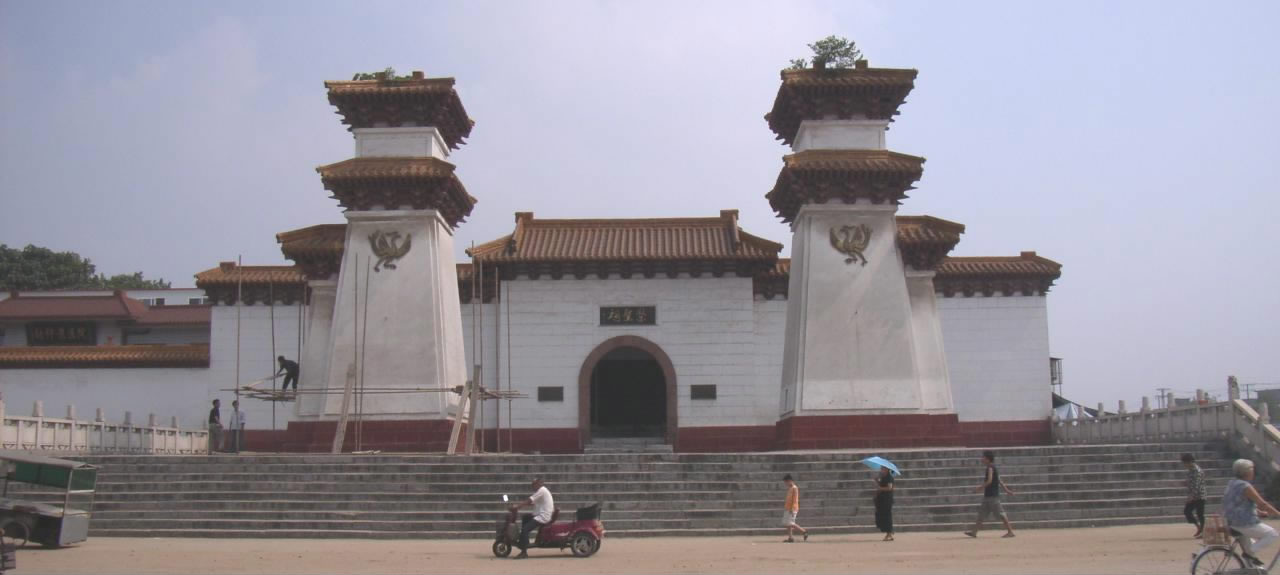
The Nanyang Xu Zhongjing Memorial Hall

The official language of Nanyang is Mandarin Chinese, but most locals speak the Henan dialect, with its easily identifiable features; this local dialect is known as Nanyang Hua (南阳话), and is spoken by about 15 million people in the area.

There are mainly Chu culture series, Han culture series, Three Kingdoms culture series, and various ancient architectural development and utilization series. The rare treasures unearthed from the Spring and Autumn tombs in Danyang, the capital of Chu, are well-known and the Chu Great Wall site, known as the "father of the Great Wall of China," has attracted attention. The Han cultural relics in Nanyang, represented by the "Three Wonders of Nanyang Han Culture" such as portrait stones, portrait bricks, and pottery dogs, rank first in the country in terms of quantity, scale, content, research, and tourism value discovered; There are also the largest ancient iron smelting workshop in the country - the Wafangzhuang site, the sizable Han Wancheng site, the medical saint temple where the famous Han Dynasty great medical expert Zhang Zhongjing's ancestral tomb is located, and the famous tomb of the Eastern Han Dynasty scientist and writer Zhang Heng at home and abroad. The historical influence of the Three Kingdoms period is profound, and the remaining relics mainly include the Wuhou Temple, Weigong Bridge, Fengchu Terrace, as well as the ancient battlefield of Huoshao Bowang in Fangcheng and the council stage in Xinye.

There is also a local form of Chinese opera called Wan bang.

=== Famous people from Nanyang ===
- Zhuge Liang, resided in Nanyang; renowned adviser to Liu Bei and the first chancellor of the Shu Han during the Three Kingdoms era
- Fan Zhongyan, resided in Dengzhou, Nanyang; a Chinese military strategist, philosopher, poet, and politician during the Song dynasty
- Eryue He, resided in Nanyang; writer

=== Within the metropolitan area ===
==== Temples, cathedrals, and mosques ====
- Wolong Gang
- Nanyang Mansion (Ming & Qing dynasty)
- Temple of holy doctor Zhang Zhongjing
- Zhang Heng's Grave (Han dynasty)
- Art Museum of Stone Portrait and Carvings of Han Dynasty (汉画馆)

=== Outside the metropolitan area, but within the municipality ===
==== Temples, cathedrals, and mosques ====
- Jingziguan in Xichuan County is a historical and cultural town.
- Neixiang County Mansion (Ming & Qing dynasty)
- Sheqi Meeting Place (Qing dynasty)
- Dengzhou Huazhou College

==== Sights ====
- Funiu Shan World Geology Park
- Danjiangkou Reservoir
- Tongbai Water-Curtain Cave Temple
- Shiren Mountain
- Wu Hou Ci

== See also ==
- Expressways of Henan
- China National Highways
- Expressways of China
- Henan
- Wolong District
- Wancheng District
