= Law of South Korea =

The legal system of South Korea is a civil law system that has its basis in the Constitution of the Republic of Korea. The Court Organization Act, which was passed into law on 26 September 1949, officially created a three-tiered, independent judicial system. The revised Constitution of 1987 codified judicial independence in Article 103, which states that, "Judges rule independently according to their conscience and in conformity with the Constitution and the law." The 1987 rewrite also established the Constitutional Court, the first time that South Korea had an active body for constitutional review.

The Korean judicial system is based on a continental style inquisitorial system, which is markedly different from the English adversarial system. Like Chinese prosecutors and Japanese prosecutors also, Korean prosecutors directly or indirectly conduct criminal investigations. Another departure from the British/American system is the admissibility of suspect interrogation records produced by the prosecutors without defense counsel being present. A confession made without assistance of legal counsel is admissible if the suspect confirms the authenticity of the record at a preparatory hearing or during the trial. If the suspect denies its authenticity, the record could still be admissible if there is a circumstantial guarantee of trustworthiness. However, a record made by a police officer is inadmissible if the suspect denies authenticity later in the process.

Both the Constitution and the Penal Code contain provisions that prohibit ex post facto laws and violations of due process. In addition, the Constitution requires judicial warrants for arrest, detention, search, or seizure, except where a person suspected of a crime is caught in flagrante delicto or where a person suspected of a sufficiently serious crime is a flight risk or might destroy evidence, in which cases an ex post facto warrant may be issued. Additionally, no criminal suspect may be tortured or compelled to testify against himself. The Constitution also requires that a person arrested for a crime be given assistance of counsel and have the right to petition the court for habeas corpus.

Citizens of the Republic of Korea are guaranteed various civil rights and protections by Chapter II of the Constitution, which also imposes the duties of military service and taxes. These rights can be suspended however, for the purposes of social order and national security. The National Security Act prohibits "anti-government activities", which effectively criminalizes activities such as promoting anti-government ideologies (especially communism) and joining anti-government organizations.

== History ==
In Korea, many disputes were settled by de facto, informal mediators like elder members of the community or family without making their way to the court. However, as Korea modernized, lawsuits increased dramatically. The total number of civil cases filed in 2002 was 1,015,894 which went up to 1,288,987 in 2006. The South Korean legal system effectively dates from the introduction of the original Constitution of the Republic of Korea and the organization of South Korea as an independent state. During the existence of the Republic of Korea, the Constitution has been revised or rewritten several times, the most recent of which was in 1987 at the beginning of the Sixth Republic.

The Court Organization Act, which was passed into law on 26 September 1949, officially created a three-tiered, independent judicial system in the Republic of Korea.

The revised Constitution of 1987 guaranteed that judges would not be removed from office for any reason other than impeachment, criminal acts, or incapacity. Additionally, the 1987 Constitution officially codified judicial independence in Article 103, which states that, "Judges rule independently according to their conscience and in conformity with the Constitution and the law." In addition to the new guarantees of judicial independence, the 1987 rewrite of the Constitution established the Constitutional Court, marking the first time that South Korea had an active body for constitutional review.

== Judicial system ==
The judicial system of the Republic of Korea is composed of the Supreme Court of Korea, the Constitutional Court of Korea, six High Courts, 13 District Courts, and several courts of specialized jurisdiction, such as the Family Court and Administrative Court. In addition, branches of District Courts may be established, as well as Municipal Courts. South Korean courts are organized and empowered in chapters V and VI of the Constitution of the Republic of Korea.

There is no system of juries in the judicial system of South Korea, although since February 2, 2008 a limited provision for advisory juries has been introduced for criminal cases and environmental cases, and all questions of law and fact are decided by judges.

== Basic rights ==
Citizens of the Republic of Korea are guaranteed several basic rights(fundamental rights) by Chapter II of the Constitution. These rights include (but are not limited to):

- freedom of speech, religion, assembly, and the press;
- the right to vote, hold public office, and petition the government;
- protections against double jeopardy, involuntary labor, ex post facto laws, and warrantless searches of residences; and
- the right to education, work, marriage, and health

In addition to the rights granted in this section of the Constitution, two duties are imposed upon citizens of the Republic of Korea: the duty to pay taxes and the duty to enter into military service. In addition, Article 37(2) provides that the "freedoms and rights of citizens may be restricted by law only when necessary for national security, the maintenance of law and order, or for public welfare".

One limitation placed on civil rights in South Korea is the National Security Act, which limits "anti-government activities". In particular, the National Security Act criminalizes activities such as promoting anti-government ideologies (especially communism) or joining anti-government organizations. The Constitutional Court has narrowed the applicational scope of the National Security Act over the years.

Nevertheless, Korean activist lawyers have managed to become a formidable institution within Korea's legal system, in part due to the election of Roh Moo-hyun as president.

== Criminal law ==
Criminal law in South Korea is largely codified in the Penal Code, which was originally enacted in 1953, and has undergone little revision since. In addition to the Penal Code, several 'special acts' have been enacted that create criminal offenses not found in the Penal Code or else modify the penalties of crimes found in the Penal Code. In cases where provisions in a special act create an apparent conflict with the Penal Code, the special act is usually given preference.

=== Due process ===
Both the Constitution and the Penal Code contain provisions that prohibit ex post facto laws and violations of due process. In addition, the Constitution requires judicial warrants for arrest, detention, search, or seizure, except where a person suspected of a crime is caught in flagrante delicto or where a person suspected of a sufficiently serious crime is a flight risk or might destroy evidence, in which cases an ex post facto warrant may be issued.

Additionally, no criminal suspect may be tortured or compelled to testify against himself. The Constitution also requires that a person arrested for a crime be given assistance of counsel (selected or appointed), be informed of the charges against him and of his right to counsel, and have the right to petition the court for habeas corpus. A person arrested for a crime also has the right to have his family or other close kin promptly notified as to the reason, time, and place of his detention.

=== The Korean Penal Code ===
The Korean Penal Code is organized into 372 articles, further organized into 4 chapters of general provisions and 42 chapters of specific provisions. Abortion is restricted under the Korean Penal Code; however, the Constitutional Court of South Korea has ruled the criminalization of abortion as unconstitutional, causing the provision to lose effect by the end of 2020.

== Criminal procedure ==
=== Rules of evidence ===
The Korean rules of evidence confer a high probative value to so-called suspect interrogation records produced by the prosecutors, which is "a protocol containing a statement of a suspect or of any other person, prepared by a public prosecutor or a judicial police". However, this document is technically hearsay under the English American legal system and contains a record of a confession made without assistance of legal counsel. While either the police officer or prosecutor can produce a suspect interrogation record, one made by a prosecutor is admissible if the suspect confirms the authenticity of the record at a preparatory hearing or during the trial. If the suspect denies its authenticity, the record could still be admissible if there is a circumstantial guarantee of trustworthiness. However, a record made by a police officer is inadmissible if the suspect denies authenticity later in the process.

The suspect can confirm authenticity by signing the record at the end, at which time it is then presumed to be confirmed. Another way to confirm is by substantial acknowledgment where the defendant verifies the content of the record. A police-produced record is required to have substantial acknowledgment.

==== Prosecutors ====
The Korean legal system belongs to the continental inquisitorial system, which is markedly different from the English adversarial system. It was modeled after European continental systems such as German and French judicial structure. Like Chinese prosecutors and European and Japanese prosecutors, Korean prosecutors directly or indirectly conduct criminal investigations. They involve themselves in judicial procedure by conducting investigations, determining indictable cases, and the prosecution process.

Korean prosecutors have contributed to successful prosecution of many highly ranked officials and renowned conglomerate business leaders, including two former presidents (1995) and sons of incumbent presidents (1997 and 2002 respectively). Especially in 1997, the South Korean prosecution service contributed to the imprisonment of the son of the incumbent president, Kim Hyeon Chul, which happened for the first time in world judicial history. As the result of successful, even relentlessly fair probings and prosecutions of corporate crimes, they often face criticism from corrupt politicians and business leaders as to whether prosecutors' application on laws may be too severe and harsh.

Two scandal cases right before the presidential election in 2012 gave huge blows to the reputation of Korean prosecutors, and this brought in the abolition of the "grand central investigation team" in the prosecution service, which was replaced by "anti-corruption team" in Seoul central district of the prosecution service (in 2013). This was a downsized format of the grand central investigation team in overall structure, i.e. personnel and scale. Also, the Korean government introduced a specially-appointed prosecutors organization (in 2014) for when it comes to handling large corporate-bureaucrat scandals requiring a supreme level of transparency and objectivity. Specially-appointed prosecutors will be chosen by votes of national assembly members.

However, it has been controversial whether the abolition of the grand central investigation team was inevitable, as it had accomplished substantial achievements in effective prosecution of huge corruption-corporate crimes (during the period 1981–2013). In addition, there are doubts whether or not the objectivity of specially-appointed prosecutors would be guaranteed when the appointment is being made by members of national assembly. If the majority of national assembly members do not want the criminal case investigated, then it is likely that the case will not be handled at all.

During the Lee Myung Bak government, Korean prosecutors often faced criticism over seemingly lenient prosecution of several cases, which was known to be related to President Lee's national project and his relatives. Plus, they are sometimes blamed for suspicious leniency in investigating prosecutors themselves. However, since the election of President Park, the Korean prosecution service has been making efforts on self-purification process in eliminating corruptions. They also are making endeavours in succession to the past Korean prosecution service's effective and objective processing of criminal investigations.

=== Role of counsel ===
Currently, defense lawyers play a minimal role in the interrogation process. Defense counsel can be present during interrogation and can only object when the method of interrogation is unjust, and counsel can give opinions only after the interrogators approve.

=== Jury trial ===
In January 2009, Korea began experimenting with a limited form of lay jury system.

== Civil law ==
Civil law(Private law) issues in Korea are regulated by the Civil Code (민법,民法) and the Commercial Code (상법,商法). The Civil Code was enacted in 1960 and is based upon the Japanese civil code which was used in Korea prior to the enactment.

=== Tort law ===
Korean Civil Code Article 750 defines torts by stating "Any person who causes losses to or inflicts injuries on another person by an unlawful act, willfully or negligently, shall make compensation for damages."

== Civil procedure ==
Until recently there was little English literature written about Korean civil procedure. The primary body of law on civil procedure is the Korean Civil Procedure Act and the Korean Rules of Civil Procedure (KRCP). Another important area is the Civil Execution Act first enacted in 2002 as a separate act. For special cases, there is the Family Litigation Act for family law matters and the Bankruptcy and Rehabilitation Act for bankruptcy and restructuring proceedings.

=== Enactment of the Korean Civil Procedure Act ===
After independence, the Japanese civil procedure law remained in force until the Korean Civil Procedure Act (KCPA) was enacted on July 1, 1960. The KCPA has been amended 14 times with the most drastic change occurring in 2002. The 2002 KCPA emphasized the pretrial phase and the concentration of the trial for the sake of efficiency as well as separating civil execution from the KCPA.

==== Guiding principles ====
Article 1 of the KCPA stipulates that the court should strive to enhance fairness, speed, and efficiency in civil proceedings.

=== Standing ===
Under the Civil Act, a natural or a juristic person has a party standing. An association and a foundation other than a juristic person can have standing as a party if additional requirements are met. They are (1) there is a decision making body, (2) representing organ that acts thereby creating and exercising and fulfilling the rights and duties of the organization, (3) assets separate from the assets of its members.

=== Jurisdiction ===
The district courts along with their branch courts have original jurisdiction over civil cases. A single judge presides over a case in controversies not exceeding 50 million won. Above that amount, a panel of three judges hears the case. Cases that are complex and difficult for a single judge to handle are handled by a three-judge panel as well. The specific rules are prescribed in the Regulation on the Subject Matter Jurisdiction in Civil and Family Litigations.

The parties can also establish jurisdiction of a particular court by agreement in writing unless another court has an exclusive jurisdiction over the matter. If the defendant fails to raise a timely jurisdictional challenge in its pleading during the pre-trial on the merits of the case, the defendant is deemed to have consented to the jurisdiction.

For cases of international character, Korean private international law, also known as conflict of laws, determines the jurisdiction. A Korean court has jurisdiction when a party or a case in controversy has substantial relationship with Korea. In determining jurisdiction, the unique nature of international jurisdiction and the relevant clauses in Korean law are considered as well.

=== Venue ===
There are general and special venues under Korean civil procedure. The court at the defendant's domicile can hear the claims. If the defendant's domicile is not known or does not exist, the court at the defendant's residence can hear the claim. The KCPA also lists special venues in addition to general venues such as the workplace, where the obligation is performed, where the subject matter is located, or where the tort occurred. If there are multiple venues, the plaintiff can choose one of them to bring an action.

=== Litigation process ===
==== Filing a complaint ====
A civil action begins when a plaintiff files a complaint, which sets out the alleged facts and remedy sought, with the court. A complaint must state the parties, legal representative if any, the remedy sought, and cause of actions. The plaintiff can seek remedy such as damages, specific performance and injunctions. The three types of actions are performance, declaratory judgment, and formation claims.

==== Performance claims ====
The action is to compel the defendant to perform or refrain from certain acts.

==== Declaratory claims ====
The action is to have the court declare existence or absence of the legal relationship in controversy.

==== Formation claims ====
The action is to create or change a legal relationship by a court order.

==== Service of process ====
When a complaint is properly received by the court, the court serves the defendant with a duplicate of the complaint, usually by certified mail but also by court officials or a marshall. If the defendant's address cannot be found, the court can order a public notice instead.

==== Dismissing a complaint ====
The plaintiff can dismiss the case at any time before the defendant makes his pleading on the merit. In such case, the defendant is deemed to have consented to dismissal if he makes no objection within two weeks after the plaintiff moves to do so.

=== Pretrial period ===
The pretrial period is to clarify disputed facts and legal issues. The parties exchange briefs and supporting documents through answers and counterclaims under the court supervision. The defendant is required to file a written answer within 30 days after the complaint is served. In response, the defendant can accept, dispute, or remain silent about the allegations.

==== Judgment without a trial ====
If the defendant accepts the claim or admits all the facts, the court can render a judgment without a trial. When the defendant fails to contest the complaints in a timely manner or remains silent, the court can regard it as acceptance or admission as well.

=== Trial ===
When the pre-trial period is over, the judge sets a date for the trial. The trial is public and done orally. As there is no jury in civil litigation, all trials are bench trials. The parties can represent pro se and the court can appoint a public defender for in forma pauperis.

=== Rules of evidence ===
The contested facts need to be proven by evidence, while facts admitted by the opponent do not require evidence. The judge can only rule based on the evidence presented and cannot use any of their personal knowledge to rule on the case. The court has very wide discretion in assessing relevance and materiality of evidence, and virtually any type of evidence can be admitted to the court. Typically, documentary evidence tends to have higher probative value than oral testimony.

==== Witnesses ====
Unlike other countries, the party to the litigation cannot be a witness. Witnesses have the privilege not to testify if they have a justification. KCPA Article 315(1) lists attorneys, patent attorneys, notaries public, certified public accountants, doctors, pharmacists, and priests to have such privilege.

The witness is first examined by one party and then cross-examined by the opposing party, followed by re-direct and re-cross. The judge can also ask questions of the witnesses during the examination. Leading questions are permitted only on cross-examination and not others.

=== Verdict ===
After the conclusion of the trial, the judge renders a judgment based on the evidence presented and law. The opinion of the court follows a highly structured format of (1) parties and legal representatives, cause of action, date when the pleadings were done, the court. Unlike the opinions of the common law jurisdictions, the Korean judicial opinions tend to be brief and often lack detailed reasoning for the conclusion.

=== Appeal ===
When the decision is given, the losing party can appeal to the court above within 14 days after the judgment is served to that party or else the judgment becomes final. The other party can cross appeal as well. The court of appeals can examine the facts as well as law and the parties can submit new allegations and pieces of evidence.

After the appellate court makes a decision, the parties can appeal to the Supreme Court. The Supreme Court hears a large number of appeal cases (about 8,859 in 2006) and sometimes rules on factual issues as well.

=== Res judicata ===
After the appeal process is over, the judgment is finalized and is binding.

=== Enforcement ===
The enforcement of civil judgments is dictated by the Civil Execution Act. Judgments rendered by a foreign court can be enforced.

== International laws and treaties ==
Treaties ratified by the Republic of Korea have the same effect as domestic law, as stated in Article 6 of the Constitution. The Constitution gives the power to make treaties to the President, while the National Assembly has the right to consent to treaties made by the President. South Korea is currently party to several international agreements and organizations. Most notably, South Korea joined the Hague convention on International Child Abduction in 2012, but was criticized for its repetitive pattern of non-compliance, earning the title, the "Haven for child abductors".

== Gallery ==
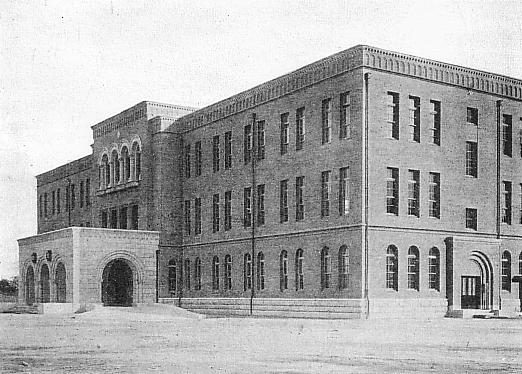
Seoul Supreme Court during Japanese rule

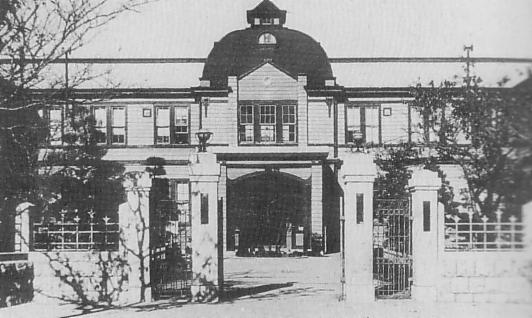
Busan District Court, same period

== See also ==
- Constitution of South Korea
- Constitutional Court of Korea
- Copyright law of South Korea
- Criminal law of South Korea
- Civil law of South Korea
- Civil Procedure of South Korea
- Politics of South Korea
- Supreme Court of Korea
- Supreme Prosecutors' Office of the Republic of Korea
- Administrative Law of South Korea
