= Civil registration =

System by which a government records the vital events of its citizens and residents

The United Nations defines civil registration as the continuous, permanent, compulsory and universal recording of the occurrence and characteristics of vital events pertaining to the population as provided through decree or regulation in accordance with the legal requirements of a country.

In most countries, a government registration office is the depository of the particulars of certain vital events, such as births, marriages and deaths of its citizens and residents that take place within its jurisdiction. Which vital events are recorded on the register of each jurisdiction may vary, and may include live birth, death, foetal death, name, change of name, marriage, divorce, annulment of marriage, judicial separation of marriage, adoption, legitimization and recognition. A family register is a type of civil register which is more concerned with events within the family unit and is common in some Continental European such as Germany (Familienbuch), France, Spain, and in Asian countries, such as China (Hukou), Japan (Koseki), and North and South Korea (Hoju).

The relevant government registration office may be referred to in each jurisdiction by various names, such as civil registry, civil register (but this is also an official term for an individual file of a vital event), vital records, and other terms, and the office responsible for receiving the registrations can be called a bureau of vital statistics, registry of vital records and statistics, registrar, registry, register, registry office (officially register office), or population registry.

On application, the government office will prepare legal documents (usually called a certificate) that can be used to establish relevant facts and used to protect various rights of individuals. Another purpose is to create a data source for the compilation of vital statistics. However, the accuracy of the information on the certificates is entirely based on the information that had been disclosed to the government office during the registration stage. The most common legal documents that may be issued by the registration office are birth certificates, death certificates, and marriage certificates.

The United Nations General Assembly in 1979 adopted the Convention on the Elimination of All Forms of Discrimination Against Women, Article 16 of which requires countries to establish compulsory civil registration of marriages. Most countries have a legal requirement for a relevant authority to be notified of certain life events, such as births, marriages and deaths.

Civil registration is carried out primarily for the purpose of establishing the legal documents required by law. These records are also a main source of vital statistics. Complete coverage, accuracy and timelines of civil registration are essential to ensure the quality of vital statistics."

Additionally, in some countries, immigration, emigration, and any change of residence may require notification. A register of residents is a type of civil register primarily concerned with the current residence.

== History ==
The first country to establish a nationwide population register was France in 1539, using the registers of the Catholic Church. Sweden followed in 1631, on the basis of a register drawn up by the Church of Sweden on behalf of the Swedish king.

== Challenges ==
Civil registration is faced with many challenges, both on the demand side and supply side, especially in low-income countries. The demand-side challenges include a lack of awareness of the need for and importance of registration of vital events, and the situation is not helped by the many existing barriers to registration. For example, in 2009, the World Health Statistics Quarterly of the World Health Organization estimated that only about 1% of the estimated deaths in low-income groups are reported and just about 9% in lower-middle-income groups.

The registration systems in many cases are very difficult, causing potential barriers to accessing the registration. Furthermore, in certain societies, due to stigmatisation based on cultural and religious settings, single mothers may fear questions of paternity during notification through chief or community agents.

On the supply side, challenges often involve different, and often conflicting, legal frameworks various stakeholders (health institution, civil registry, statistics agency), and as a result, many countries with "burdensome procedures and non-standardized systems across a country, leading to confusion regarding what individuals need to do or present." Other challenges include accessibility of remote areas and also irregular migration caused by civil conflicts and porous borders.

== Innovations ==
There have been new developments in civil registration across the globe over the years. With the advent of enhanced and information and communication technology, civil registration has been moving from a paper-intensive, manual-based civil registration to more automated and digitalised systems. Some of the innovations implemented in civil registration include the use of e-birth notification systems, whereby the health officials are able to notify the national population registration system with new births. This system improves registration process by timely feeding the system with information as soon as a birth occurs. Another innovation, such as that implemented by iCivil Africa in Burkina Faso, is the use of a mobile application to register newborns.

== Family register ==
A family register is a civil registry used in many countries to track information of a genealogical or family-centric legal interest. Other terms are household register and family album. The system is called hojeok in South Korea and koseki in Japan, Familienbuch in Germany, hukou in China, hộ khẩu in Vietnam. And (formerly), Bianhu in China and propiska in the Soviet Union.

Often, official recognition of certain events or status may be granted only when such event or status is registered in the family registry—for example, in Japan, a marriage is legally effective when and only when such filing is recorded into the household register (known as a koseki). In other cases, the family register serves as a centralized repository for family legal events, such as births, deaths, marriages, and expatriations, as with the Familienbuch in use in Germany and the livret de famille in France, although it is not the sole source of official recognition for such events.

Use of government-sanctioned or administered family registers, while common in some European nations and in some countries which use continental-style civil law (where the family or household is legally viewed as the fundamental unit of a nation), is nonetheless rare in English-speaking countries (for example, the closest equivalent in the United Kingdom is the electoral roll, which is organised by address, but it is limited in the amount of information recorded).

Although the United States for example assigns most citizens and residents a Social Security number intended to be unique to the recipient and information regarding birth, death and work history (in the form of contributions to the Social Security system) is collected, the U.S. Social Security Administration has long been intentionally restricted in the scope of information collected and maintained regarding individuals where not directly related to Social Security benefits—as such, no information is centrally collected regarding marriage, citizenship status, parentage, or the like, in contrast to the German and Japanese family register systems.

Establishment of a more comprehensive personal information repository (along the lines of the Japanese or former German systems) has been criticized by civil liberties advocates as subject to governmental or criminal abuse, while proponents cite the benefits of simplified access to vital information.

In South Korea, use of the hojeok (similar to the Japanese household registry, written using identical Chinese characters) was repealed in 2005, in favor of a personal registry system.

The systems of household registers in China, Korea and Japan date back to the Tang dynasty or Heian period or earlier, both since the seventh century.

=== List of household register systems ===
==== East Asia ====
- The Hukou system (户口), also known as Huji (户籍) system, in China.
- The Koseki system (戸籍) in Japan.
- The former Hoju system in North Korea. Hoju (Korean: 호주; Hanja: 戶主) means the 'head of the family', Hojuje (Korean: 호주제; Hanja: 戶主制) is the 'head of the family' system, and Hojeok (alternate romanization: Hojok; 호적, 戶籍) is the 'family register'.
- The former Hoju system in South Korea attracted controversy for being innately patriarchal and hence representing a 'violation of the right to gender equality'. It was abolished on 1 January 2008 and replaced with the Family Relations Register system (Korean: 가족관계등록부; Hanja: 家族關係登錄簿; RR: gajokgwangyedeungnokbu).
- The Household registration system (戶籍, Mandarin: Hùjí, Hokkien: Hō͘-che̍k, Hakka: Fu-sit) in Taiwan.

==== South East Asia ====
- Vietnam: The hộ khẩu, based on the Chinese hukou
- Thailand: The Tabien Baan (ทะเบียนบ้าน), or document proving House Registration, is distributed by a village, city, or other municipal authority. The Tabien Baan (sometimes spelled Tambien Baan) reflects the residents who live at a specific property (this document is not used as proof of Real Estate ownership, for that one must have a Thai Chanote or Title Deed). The Tabien Baan (House Registration) is issued to Thai Citizens and is used as a permanent address for service of process and other official mailings. A Tabien Baan is an extremely important document for Thai nationals because it acts as proof of a Thai person's residence. Therefore, it is used to determine a Thai person's voting district and in the case of Thai men of military age, the Tabien Baan is used to ascertain what district the Thai man will be placed in when drawing for the military draft. This can be critical because if one district reaches a certain level of volunteers then it is not necessary to further draft any inhabitants of that district. As a result, a Thai man's House Registration (Tabien Baan) can have a massive impact upon their life and career depending upon the district in which they live.
- Indonesia: Kartu keluarga (literally 'family card') is a document in Indonesia that proves residency and which records relationships and family members. Every family in Indonesia is required to own one of these documents. Despite its name, the document is technically a document paper (instead of a card) and large in size. This document records the identity of the family's head and the individual members. The document is kept by the family's head, ketua RT (head of neighborhood association) and desa or kelurahan office. The document is a provincial government document, thus, it is not permitted to strike out, change, replace or make additions in the document. Every data change has to be reported to the village or kelurahan office which will replace the old one with the updated one. Newcomers are not recorded in the document until they have been reported or have been deemed not to have local residency status. Changes in data have to be reported within 14 working days by the family's head to desa or kelurahan office. Each report of changes must be submitted with the copy that is held by the family's head and ketua RT. Changes in data include: birth, death or migration (of a member). However, if a family moves to different desa or kelurahan, the document must be revoked by desa or kelurahan office, which must be submitted with the copy that held by family's head and ketua RT. The official in the prior location will produce Surat Keterangan Pindah (Note of Migration) which will be used to make the new Kartu Keluarga in the arrival by desa or kelurahan office.

==== Continental Europe ====
- The former Familienbuch system in Germany.
- The livret de famille system in France.
- The anagrafe [it] system in Italy.
- The former libro de familia system in Spain.
- The former Propiska system in Russia.
- The Swedish Population Register.

== Africa ==
=== Namibia ===
Map of Africa, 1895, indicating whether that country had a civil register

In Namibia, civil registration mandate lies with the government through the Ministry of Home Affairs and Immigration, which has offices in all fourteen region of the country. Although some vital events (e.g., marriages) are recorded by various agencies (e.g., church and courts), vital records are contained in the National Population Register, which is maintained by the Department of Civil Registration within the Ministry of Home Affairs and Immigration. In Namibia, civil registration and identity management systems are integrated and managed by one department. Over the years, Namibia has transformed its civil registration processes, moving away from the manual system to an electronic system. In 2017, Namibia, which has at least 22 birth and registration offices based within the maternity wards of hospitals across the country, launched its e-birth notification system. This improvement is expected to "improve the quality of vital statistics produced in the country. The system is also a welcome departure from the present mechanism of relying on surveys for estimations of birth registration rates and projections of the numbers of births each year."

=== South Africa ===
In South Africa, vital records are contained in the National Population Register, which is maintained by the national Department of Home Affairs. Any Home Affairs office can record a vital event or issue a certified copy of a vital record.

=== Burkina Faso ===
In Burkina Faso, since 2015, a centralized civil registration and vital statistics (CRVS) system is being implemented by the non-governmental organization iCivil Africa. This "new tech start up has set themselves a massive task: to register all newborn babies digitally".

== Europe ==
=== Belgium ===
Belgium maintains a National Register (Registre National / Rijksregister) of citizens and resident foreigners. The register is administered centrally by the Ministry of the Interior (SPF Intérieur / FOD Binnenlandse Zaken) and locally by Belgian municipalities and embassies. Citizens and resident foreigners are issued with a National Register Number (numéro de registre national / rijksregisternummer), which features on their identity card.

=== France ===
France was the first country to create a national registration system. In 1539, King Francis I ordered, in the Ordinance of Villers-Cotterêts, as part of a wider legislation regarding the policing of church benefices, that the various local church institutions, mainly parishes, keep vital record registers. The ordinance ordered the creation of at least a register of baptisms, as a proof of one's date of birth, and a register of burials of churchmen, as a proof of one's date of death. Though both registers were kept by religious authorities, they were authenticated by a public notary, always a layman, and were kept in the local royal administration's archives. In fact, the church had kept parish registers since the Middle Ages. The oldest one in France is Givry's, of 1303. These registers were used to meet the ordinance's requirements.

The National Registration was fully secularized in 1792 during the French Revolution by order of the French Republic. These records have been continued through the present and are kept at the departmental archives. The National Registration includes birth, marriage, divorce, and death records.

=== Netherlands ===
In the Netherlands, maintaining the civil registry ("basisregistratie personen") is the duty of the municipalities.

Before the French Rule, the Netherlands did not have a central registration of its population, which was introduced in some parts of the country in 1796 by the French. In 1811, this registration was introduced throughout the country. The Dutch differentiate between the basisregistratie personen, an ongoing database of citizens' information, and the burgerlijke stand, which is a collection (at the municipal level) of documents evidencing certain events taking place in a given municipality, such as birth, marriage, registered partnership, and death.

Beginning on 1 January 1850, municipalities were obliged to keep citizen's records in book form (Dutch: bevolkingsregister). Early in the twentieth century this system was replaced by a card system that registered families. The move toward individual registration took place in 1939 with the introduction of the persoonskaart, a single card registering a single individual, kept in the municipality. Information gathered on this card included family name, first names, gender, position within the family, date and place of birth, marital status, address, and church affiliation, besides information on when a person entered and left a municipality.

In 1940, the Dutch government did not want to mandate citizen's identification, but during World War II the German occupying government mandated it so they could assess who was to be sent to Germany as forced labor and to select Jewish citizens from the general population. When the war was over, mandatory identification was done away with.

In the 1990s all local registries were automated, and starting on 1 October 1994 the individual registration card was replaced with a digital list containing a person's information as collected by the gemeentelijke basisadministratie van persoonsgegevens (in 2015 replaced with the 'basisregistratie personen'), kept and maintained at the municipal level. Municipalities exchange information through a closed network at the end of each day to a nationwide database, which can be consulted by officials online. Though it was generally considered "un-Dutch," on 1 January 2005 mandatory identification (when asked by a mandated person) was reintroduced for everyone over 14; official identification is to be presented for all important transactions between citizens and government.

=== Portugal ===
The civil registry in Portugal is officially established by the "Civil Registry Code" of February 18, 1911 (a few months before the promulgation of the Portuguese Constitution of 1911) and is officially called Institute of Registries and Notaries (Portuguese: Instituto dos Registos e Notariado) and exists in its current form since 2007.

On April 20, 1911, the "Law of Separation of the Church of the State" radicalized the secular state and determined that all parish registers (baptisms, marriages, and deaths) prior to 1911 should be civilly effective and transferred from parishes to newly established Civil Registry Offices. This was a previous struggle that had come since the formation of the Civil Registry Association in 1895, a Masonic organization presented by its mentors as "a strong anti-clerical and antireligious stronghold".

On December 22, 1945, the Directorate-General for Registries and Notary (Portuguese: Direcção-Geral dos Registos e do Notariado) was created in the Ministry of Justice, to oversee civil, property, commercial and motor vehicle registration services and notary services, reformed in 2007 into the Institute of Registries and Notaries (Portuguese: Instituto dos Registos e Notariado).

In general, there is a civil registry office in each Portuguese province, and in the cities of Lisbon, Porto, Vila Nova de Gaia and Setubal there are eleven, four, two and two conservatories respectively. In small and medium-sized municipalities, conservatories also accumulate other functions besides the civil registry, such as land registration (Portuguese: registo predial), commercial (legal entities, Portuguese: registo comercial) and vehicles (Portuguese: registo de automóveis). In Lisbon, the Central Registry Office (Portuguese: Conservatória dos Registos Centrais) is located, it was created in 1949 and is responsible for registrations involving Portuguese citizens abroad and for the management of any procedure that concerns Portuguese citizenship.

=== Romania ===
Civil registries were introduced in 1806–1812 during the Russian occupation, and they followed the Tsarist model of keeping them with church records. By the "Communal Law" (Legea comunală) of 31 March 1864 subsequent record keeping became the responsibility of the mayor in each dwelling, who was allowed to delegate it to one of his helpers. An effort by the state to gather the ancient historical records happened around 1926–1932 but in some cases as late as 1948–1952; a good number of these early records were lost in this process, sometimes literally by the truckload. The current name for the official building where marriages, births and deaths are recorded is called Starea Civilă (Civil Status).

=== Russia ===
Vital records (births, deaths and marriages) are called Acts of civil state or Acts of civil status (акты гражданского состояния – akty grazhdankogo sostoyaniya) in Russia. These records are available only for relatives of a died person. Acts of civil status replaced Metricheskiye knigi (Parish registers) in 1918. All registers before 1918 are open for everyone.

Births, deaths and marriages must be registered by register office called Body of registration of acts of civil status (орган записи актов гражданского состояния - organ zapisi aktov grazhdanskogo sostoyaniya or орган ЗАГС – organ ZAGS for short) or the Palace of Marriages (Дворец бракосочетаний) for civil marriage ceremonies. The system is decentralized. Each Russian federal subject has its own regional body as a part of regional government.

The Unified state register of acts of civil status (EGR ZAGS, Единый государственный реестр записей актов гражданского состояния –ЕГР ЗАГС) maintained by the Federal Tax Service of Russia began operations since October 1, 2018.

The system of resident registration in Russia (and former propiska) maintained by centralized federal body is not related to this system.

=== Spain ===
In Spain, the first civil registers were created in 1841 in the big and medium-size cities of the country. The current Civil Register was established on January 1, 1871 in all municipalities and in 1873 it was created and special Civil Register for the Royal Family, which still exits today.

Both of this registers record names, surnames, births, deaths, marriages, divorces and other relevant data, and both of them are supervised by the Ministry of Justice, through the Directorate-General for the Registries and Notaries.

=== Sweden ===
In Sweden, the civil registry is maintained by the Swedish Tax Agency (Skatteverket); up into the 1990s the Church of Sweden was responsible. Recording of births and deaths was stipulated in the early 17th century, formal national censuses have been made since the mid-18th century, and Sweden has one of the longest and most comprehensive suites of civil records of any country.

=== United Kingdom ===
In the United Kingdom, civil registration was first introduced, in England and Wales, via the 1653 marriage act, which transferred the statutory duty of recording marriages, births and burials, established in 1538, from the established churches, to the civil authorities, with a justice of peace, rather than the parish priest required to maintain a register. The act was repealed on the restitution of the monarchy in 1660, with the duty reverting to the established churches, until the Births and Deaths Registration Act 1836 which affected England and Wales. The General Register Office for England and Wales was set up and the civil registration of births, marriages, and deaths in England and Wales became mandatory on 1 July 1837. Initially the onus lay on registrars to discover and record events, so parents only had to supply information if and when asked. In 1875, the Births & Deaths Act 1874 came into force, whereby those present at a birth or death were required to report the event. Subsequent legislation introduced similar systems in Ireland (all of which was then part of the United Kingdom) on 1 April 1845 for Protestant marriages and on 1 January 1864 for all birth, marriage and death events. Civil registration was introduced in Scotland on 1 January 1855.

The administration of individual registration districts is the responsibility of registrars in the relevant local authority. There is also a national body for each jurisdiction. The local offices are generally responsible both for maintaining the original registers and for providing copies to the national body for central retention. A superintendent registrar facilitates the legal preliminaries to marriage, conducts civil marriage ceremonies and retains in his or her custody all completed birth, death and marriage registers for the district. The office of the superintendent registrar is the district register office, often referred to (informally) in the media as the "registry office".

Today, both officers may also conduct statutory civil partnership preliminaries and ceremonies, citizenship ceremonies and other non-statutory ceremonies such as naming or renewal of vows. Certified copies of the entries made by the registrars over the years are issued on a daily basis either for genealogical research or for modern legal purposes such as supporting passport applications or ensuring eligibility for the appropriate junior sports leagues.

On 1 December 2007 registrars and superintendent registrars became employees of their local authority for the first time following the enactment of the Statistics and Registration Service Act 2007.

==== England and Wales ====
Births in England and Wales must be registered within 42 days, whilst deaths must be registered within five days unless an inquest is called or a postmortem is held.

Marriages are registered at the time of the ceremony by either

1. the officiating minister of the Church of England or the Church in Wales,
2. an authorised person at a registered building, religious, or
3. a registrar at a register office, registered building or approved premise.

The official registers are not directly accessible by the general public. Instead, indexes are made available which can be used to find the relevant register entry and then request a certified copy of the details.

The General Register Office for England and Wales (now merged into His Majesty's Passport Office) has overall responsibility for registration administration.

==== Scotland ====
Civil registration came into force in Scotland on 1 January 1855. A significant difference from the English system is the greater detail required for a registration. This means that if a certified copy of an entry is requested, it will contain much more information.

The General Register Office for Scotland has overall responsibility for registration administration and drafting legislative changes in this area (as well as census data). They are governed by the Registration of Births, Deaths and Marriages (Scotland) Act 1965 and subsequent legislation (responsibility for which has now been devolved to the Scottish Parliament).

== Americas ==
=== Mexico ===
In Mexico, vital records (birth, death and marriage certificates) are registered in the Registro Civil, as called in Spanish. Each state has its own registration form. Until the 1960s, birth certificates were written by hand, in a styled, cursive calligraphy (almost unreadable for the new generations) and typically issued on security paper. After the 1960s, they were issued typed by machine.

Currently all copies (from people born before and after the 1960s) are standardized in brown-security paper and are typed automatically by a computer and the CURP (control identification number in Mexico) and the specific dates of issuing are already issued.

=== United States ===
In the United States, vital records such as birth certificates, death certificates, and frequently marriage certificates are maintained by the Office of Vital Statistics or Office of Vital Records in each individual state. Other documents such as deeds, mortgage documents, name change documents, and divorce records, as well as marriage certificates for those states not centralizing these records, are maintained by the clerk of court of each individual county. However, the term "civil registry" is not used.

== Asia ==
=== Japan ===
In Japan, the Ministry of Health, Labour and Welfare counts the number of births, deaths, stillbirths, marriages and divorces throughout the year and publishes them as vital statistics annually. Japanese civil registration is primarily based on the koseki system.

=== Philippines ===
In the Philippines, civil registrations are maintained by the Philippine Statistics Authority.

== Oceania ==
=== Australia ===
Australia has had compulsory civil registration since the mid 19th century. Today it is carried out and maintained by each state and territory. Prior to the colonies taking over civil registration, records of baptisms, marriages and burials were kept by individual churches. Because early civil registration often involved the churches, it is sometimes difficult to distinguish whether early records are civil or church records. Civil registration was carried out by government employees independent of the churches. The registration procedure and information recorded in records varies between jurisdictions.

== See also ==
- Births and Deaths Registration Act
- Census
- Egyptian National Identity Card
- National identification number
- Race and ethnicity in censuses
- Resident registration
- Social research
- Vital record
- Vital statistics (government records)
