= Lee Wu-jong =

South Korean activist (1923–2002)

- Hangul: 이우정
- Hanja: 李愚貞
- RR: I Ujeong
- MR: I Ujŏng

Lee Wu-jong (Korean: 이우정; August 1, 1923 – May 30, 2002) was a South Korean politician and feminist, labor right activist, Christian feminism activist and anti-Hoju activist from 1950s to 1980s. She was the 14th member of the National Assembly. and the leader of South Korean radical feminists. Lee Wujong was the granddaughter of Lee Hae-jo, a famous writer.
