= Registration district =

UK civil administrative region

A registration district in the United Kingdom is a type of administrative region which exists for the purpose of civil registration of births, marriages, and deaths and civil partnerships. It has also been used as the basis for the collation of census information.

== Origin and development of registration districts ==
=== England and Wales ===
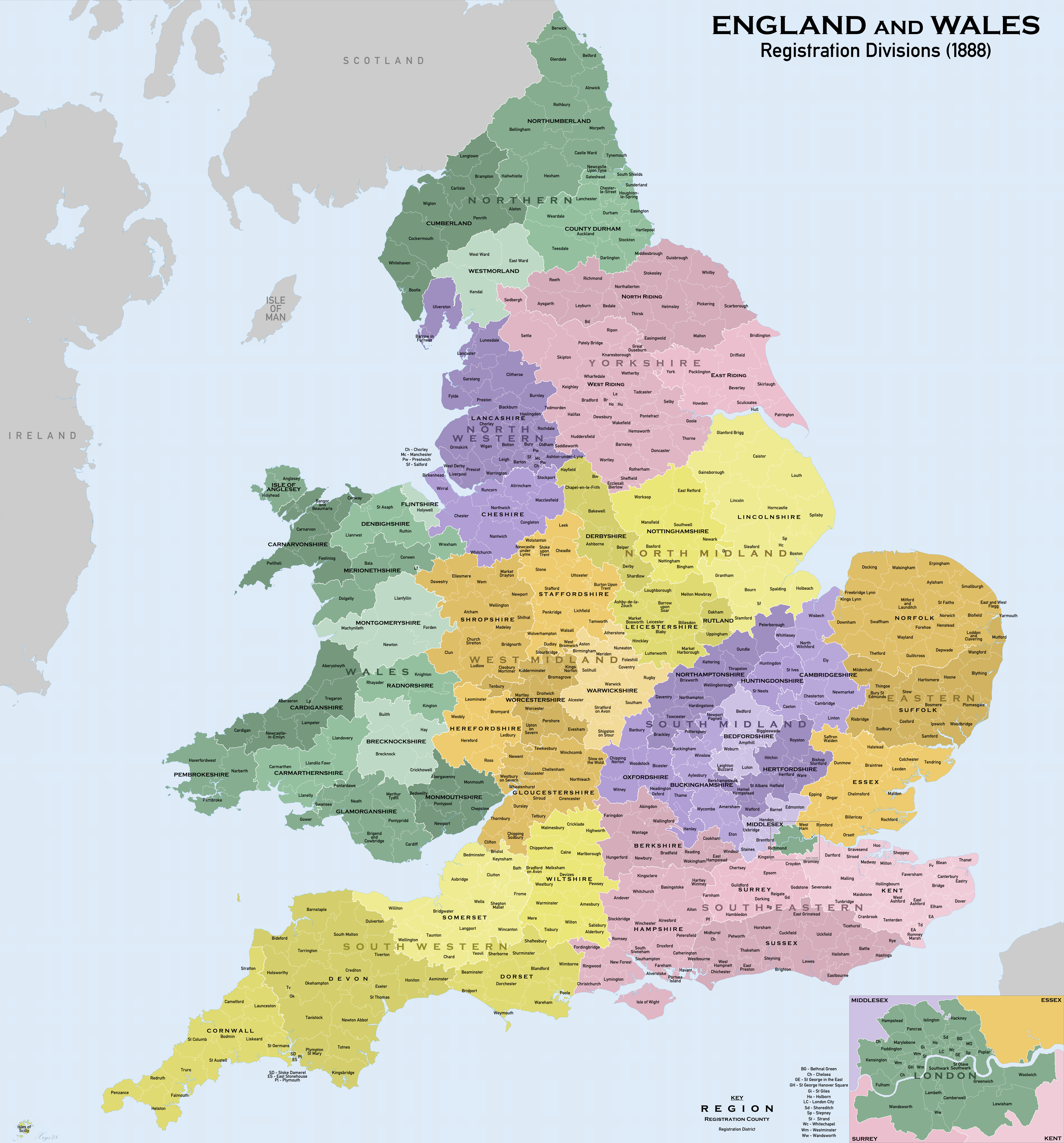
Map showing registration districts of England and Wales in 1888

Registration districts in England and Wales were created with the introduction of civil registration on 1 July 1837 and were originally co-terminous with poor law unions. Their existence as autonomous entities came to an end in 1930, when the relevant administrative county or county borough was made responsible. A subsequent series of reforms of local government has resulted in the responsibility today being held by the relevant county council, unitary authority, metropolitan district, or London borough.

Each district is divided into sub-districts, each of which has a registrar responsible for the registration of births, marriages, civil partnerships, and deaths in his or her area. Overall responsibility for a district is held by a superintendent registrar.

Registration districts are not always co-terminous with county boundaries, and so in the past were grouped into "registration counties" for statistical purposes. They remained in use for the census from 1851 to 1911.

=== Scotland ===
Map showing registration districts of Scotland in 2005.

Registration districts in Scotland came into being with the introduction of civil registration there in 1855; away from the cities their boundaries usually coincided with civil parishes. Prior to 1 January 2007, registration districts did not coincide with council areas in many areas; commonly both geographically large and densely populated council areas had several registration districts, each with a registrar within easy reach of most residents. The Local Electoral Administration and Registration Services (Scotland) Act 2006 aligned the boundaries of registration districts (or groups thereof) with those of the 32 Scottish council areas. The act also allows births and deaths to be registered with any registrar in Scotland, rather than solely in the registration district where the event occurred or in the registration district of usual residence.

=== Ireland ===
There are approximately 164 Superintendent Registrar's Districts (SRDs) in Ireland and Northern Ireland; some were dissolved, split, or merged in the mid to late 1800s, and a few (such as Fingal) were created in the 1900s. Many of the SRDs share the name of the Irish county in which most of their land exists: Specifically, the SRDs of Londonderry, Donegal, Antrim, Sligo, Monaghan, Armagh, Cavan, Longford, Roscommon, Galway, Kilkenny, Carlow, Limerick, Tipperary, Wexford, Waterford, and Cork. However, the SRDs follow the general outlines of Poor Law Unions that preceded them (see accompanying map), and often overlap across two or more counties. SRDs are also distinct from civil and ecclesiastical parishes.

When searching for the birth, marriage, or death record of an Irish ancestor, you need to know or at least have a good idea of the specific SRD and townland in order to find the record in the databases.

Starting from the northwestern tip of the island, including both Ireland (the Republic of Ireland) and Northern Ireland, and moving successively southward as if reading sentences in a book from left to right, the SRDs (with alternate spellings or new names) and the country or counties in which each one occurs are as follows:

- Dunfanaghy – Donegal.
- Milford (Millford) – Donegal.
- Inishowen – Donegal.

- Glenties – Donegal
- Letterkenny – Donegal
- Stranorlar (Stranolar, Strandlar) – Donegal
- Strabane – Donegal, Tyrone
- Derry – Londonderry, Donegal
- Newtown – Londonderry
- Limavady – Londonderry
- Coleraine – Antrim, Londonderry
- Ballymoney – Antrim, Londonderry
- Ballymena – Antrim
- Ballycastle – Antrim
- Larne – Antrim

- Donegal – Donegal
- Castlederg – Tyrone
- Irvinestown – Cavan, Fermanagh, Tyrone
- Omagh – Tyrone
- Gortin – Tyrone

Gortin was abolished in 1889 and its land split between Omagh and Strabane.

- Cookstown – Tyrone
- Dungannon – Tyrone
- Magherafelt – Londonderry
- Antrim – Antrim
- Belfast – Antrim, Down
- Newtownards – Down

- Sligo – Sligo
- Ballyshannon – Donegal, Fermanagh, Leitrim
- Manor Hamilton (Manorhamilton) – Leitrim
- Enniskillen – Cavan, Fermanagh, Tyrone
- Lisnaskea – Cavan, Fermanagh
- Clones – Fermanagh, Monaghan
- Clogher – Monaghan, Tyrone
- Monaghan – Monaghan
- Armagh – Armagh, Tyrone
- Lurgan – Antrim, Armagh, Down
- Banbridge – Armagh, Down
- Lisburn – Antrim, Down
- Downpatrick – Down

- Dromore West – Sligo
- Tobercurry – Sligo
- Boyle – Leitrim, Roscommon, Sligo
- Carrick on Shannon – Leitrim, Roscommon
- Bawnboy – Cavan, Leitrim
- Mohill – Leitrim
- Cavan – Cavan
- Cootehill – Cavan, Monaghan
- Castleblayney (Castleblaney) – Armagh, Monaghan
- Carrickmacross – Monaghan
- Dundalk – Armagh, Louth, Monaghan
- Newry – Armagh, Down
- Kilkeel – Down

- Belmullet – Mayo
- Killala – Mayo
- Ballina – Mayo, Sligo

Ballina was reduced in size in 1850, creating Killala and Belmullet.

- Swineford (Swinford) – Mayo, Roscommon
- Castlerea (Castlereagh) – Mayo, Roscommon
- Strokestown – Leitrim, Roscommon
- Longford – Longford
- Granard – Cavan, Longford, Westmeath
- Oldcastle – Cavan, Meath
- Bailieborough (Bailieboro) – Cavan, Meath
- Kells (Ceanannus Mor in Irish) – Cavan, Meath
- Navan (An Uaimh in Irish) – Meath
- Ardee – Louth, Meath
- Drogheda – Louth, Meath

- Newport – Mayo

Newport was abolished in 1886 and its land merged into Westport.

- Westport – Mayo
- Castlebar – Mayo
- Ballinrobe – Galway, Mayo
- Claremorris – Mayo
- Tuam – Galway
- Glenamaddy (Glennamaddy) – Galway, Roscommon
- Mount Bellew (Mountbellew) – Galway
- Roscommon – Galway, Leitrim, Roscommon
- Athlone – Roscommon, Westmeath
- Ballymahon – Longford, Westmeath
- Mullingar – Westmeath
- Delvin (Castletowndelvin) – Meath, Westmeath
- Trim – Meath
- Dunshauglin – Dublin, Meath
- Balrothery – Dublin

- Clifden – Galway, Mayo
- Oughterard (Oughterand) – Galway, Mayo
- Galway – Galway
- Loughrea (Lougthrea) – Galway
- Ballinasloe – Galway, Roscommon
- Portumna (Portunna) – Galway
- Borrisokane – Tipperary
- Parsonstown (Birr) – Offaly, Tipperary

Parsonstown was renamed Birr after 1891.

- Tullamore – Offaly, Westmeath
- Mountmellick – Laois, Offaly
- Athy – Kildare, Laois
- Edenderry – Kildare, Meath, Offaly
- Naas – Dublin, Kildare, Wicklow
- Celbridge – Dublin, Kildare, Meath
- Dublin North – Dublin
- Dublin South – Dublin

Some Registration District lists and maps indicate a new SRD called Fingal for part of Dublin.

- Rathdown – Dublin, Wicklow

- Kilrush – Clare
- Killadysert – Clare
- Ennis – Clare
- Ennistimon (Ennistymon) – Clare
- Corrofin (Corofin) – Clare
- Ballyvaughan – Clare
- Gort – Clare, Galway
- Tulla – Clare

Tulla was merged into Scarriff between 1901 and 1911.

- Scarriff (Scariff) – Clare, Galway
- Nenagh – Tipperary, Galway
- Roscrea – Laois, Offaly, Tipperary
- Thurles – Tipperary
- Donaghmore – Laois

Donaghmore was abolished in 1887 and its land split between Roscrea, Abbeyleix, and Urlingford.

- Urlingford – Kilkenny, Laois, Tipperary
- Abbeyleix – Laois
- Castlecomer – Kilkenny
- Kilkenny – Kilkenny
- Carlow – Carlow, Laois
- Baltinglass – Carlow, Kildare, Wicklow
- Shillelag – Carlow, Wexford, Wicklow
- Gorey – Wexford
- Rathdrum – Wicklow

- Listowel – Kerry, Limerick
- Glin – Kerry, Limerick

Glin was abolished in 1892 and its land split between Listowel and Rathkeale.

- Newcastle – Limerick
- Rathkeale – Limerick
- Croom – Limerick
- Kilmallock – Cork, Limerick
- Limerick – Limerick, Clare
- Tipperary – Limerick, Tipperary
- Cashel – Tipperary
- Callan – Kilkenny, Tipperary
- Thomastown – Kilkenny
- New Ross – Carlow, Kilkenny, Wexford
- Enniscorthy – Carlow, Wexford
- Wexford – Wexford

- Dingle – Kerry
- Tralee – Kerry
- Killarney – Kerry
- Millstreet – Cork
- Kanturk – Cork, Limerick
- Mallow – Cork
- Mitchelstown – Cork, Limerick
- Fermoy – Cork
- Lismore – Cork, Waterford
- Clogheen – Tipperary, Waterford
- Clonmel – Tipperary, Waterford
- Dungarvan – Waterford
- Kilmacthomas (Kilmac Thomas) – Waterford
- Carrick on Suir – Kilkenny, Tipperary, Waterford
- Waterford – Kilkenny, Waterford

- Cahersiveen (Cahirciveen) – Kerry
- Kenmare – Kerry
- Macroom – Cork
- Cork – Cork
- Middleton – Cork
- Youghal – Cork, Waterford

- Castletown – Cork, Westmeath
- Bantry – Cork
- Dunmanway (Dunmanaway) – Cork
- Bandon – Cork
- Kinsale – Cork

- Skull – Cork
- Skibbereen – Cork
- Clonakilty – Cork

Within each SRD in Ireland are subdistricts. Here are a few subdistricts (this is a non-exhaustive list):

- Achill
- Aghada
- Annacarriga
- Aran (aka Aran Islands)
- Ardfert
- Arklow
- Athenry
- Aughrim
- Bagenalstown
- Balla
- Ballincollig
- Ballindine
- Ballineen
- Ballyclogh (Ballyclough)
- Ballyconnell
- Ballycroy
- Ballyfeard
- Ballyhaunis
- Ballyhooly
- Ballymartle
- Ballynoe
- Bangor
- Belturbet
- Blackrock
- Blessington
- Boherboy
- Bray
- Carrickfergus
- Carrigallen
- Castlepollard
- Clondalkin
- Coole
- Donaghmoyne
- Donnybrook
- Dundrum
- Dunglow (Dungloe)
- Kildare
- Killiney
- Kingstown
- Leitrim
- Louth
- Maynooth
- Newbridge
- Newmarket
- Portadown
- Portlaoise
- Portrush
- Queenstown
- Rathmines
- Tanderagee
- Templemore
- Warrenpoint

== Footnotes ==
- Registration Districts of Ireland, Michael J. Thompson, copyright 2009, 2012. This document and its contents are made available for non‐commercial use only.
