= Vehicle registration plates of Timor-Leste =

Democratic Republic of East Timor
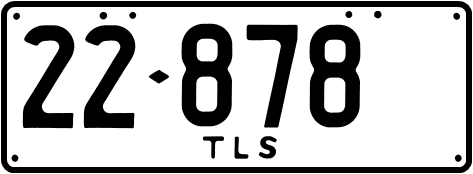
- Regular legal standard number plate from East Timor.
- Country: East Timor
- Country code: None (unofficially using TLS)

Current series
- Size: 372 mm × 134 mm 14.6 in × 5.3 in
- Serial format: Not standard
- Colour (front): Black on white
- Colour (rear): Black on white

Vehicle registration plates of East Timor are Australian standard 372 mm × 134 mm, and use Australian stamping dies. East Timor requires its residents to register their motor vehicles and display vehicle registration plates. Vehicle registration numbers consist of five digits (e.g. 24•180), and display the letters TL or TLS, short for Timor Lorosae, the name for East Timor in Tetum (or Timor-Leste, the name of the country in Portuguese). The current format started in 2002.

== Vehicle types ==
Vehicle types
Type	Example	Meaning
Private		
Government	05-204G; TLS	

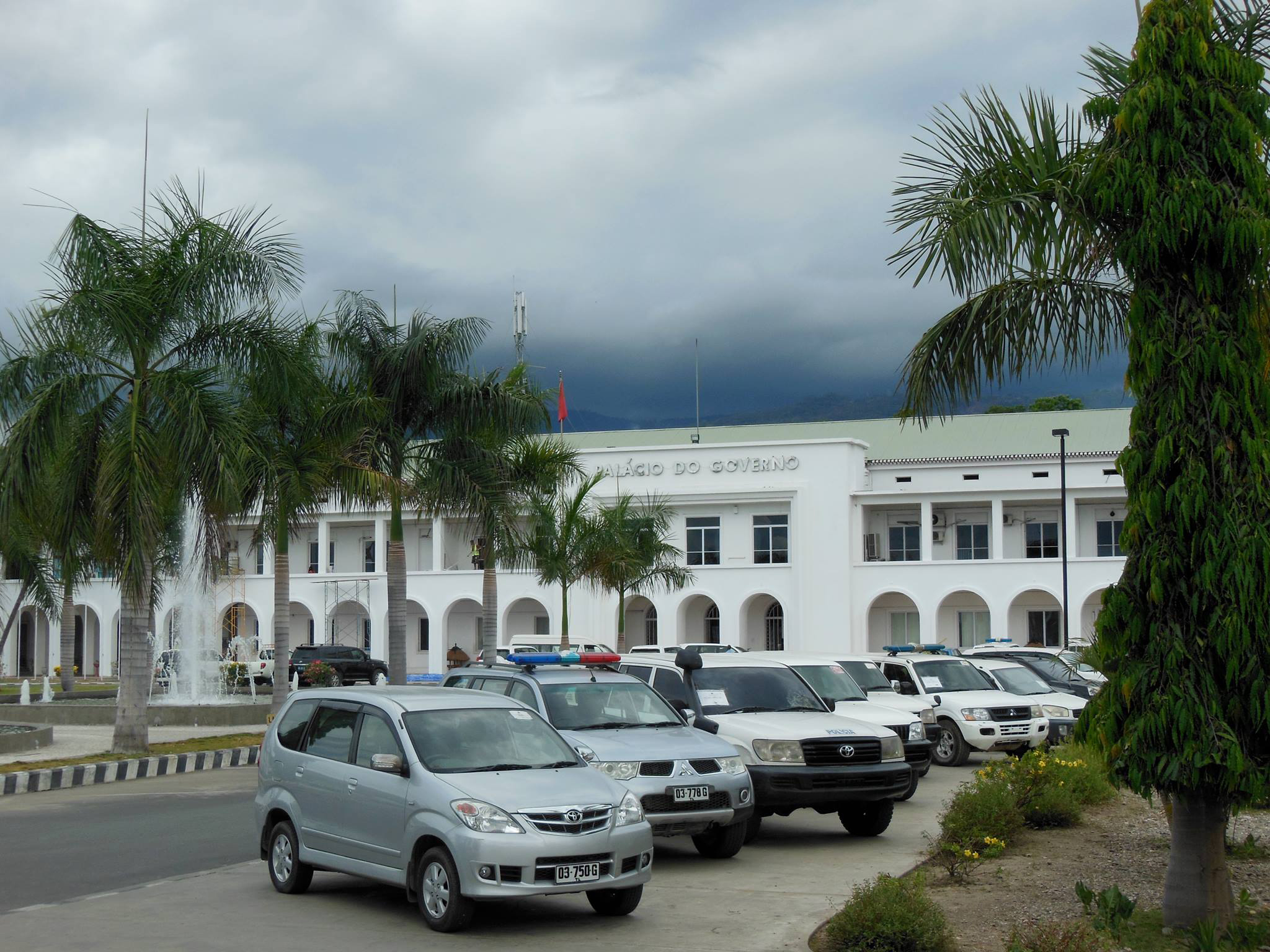
Government vehicles, Palácio do Governo, Dili

Government vehicles have a similar format, but with four digits and the letter 'G'.

== Portuguese Timor ==
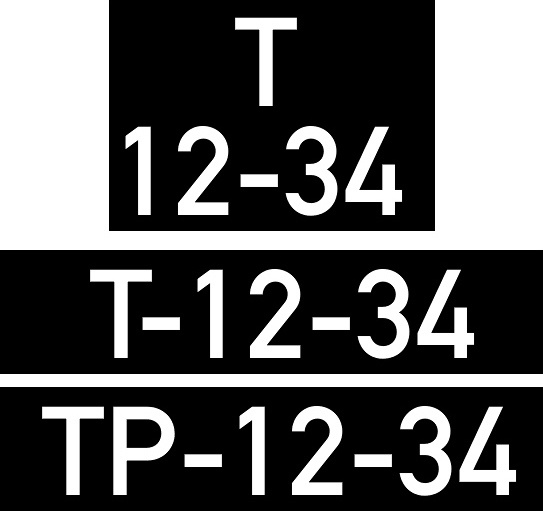
Portuguese Timor vehicle registration plate format

When the country was a Portuguese colony, known as Portuguese Timor, vehicle registrations followed the same format to those used in Portugal, and other colonies, using the prefix T (for Timor) or alternatively TP for Timor Português or Portuguese Timor in Portuguese in white letters on a black background.

== Indonesian occupation ==
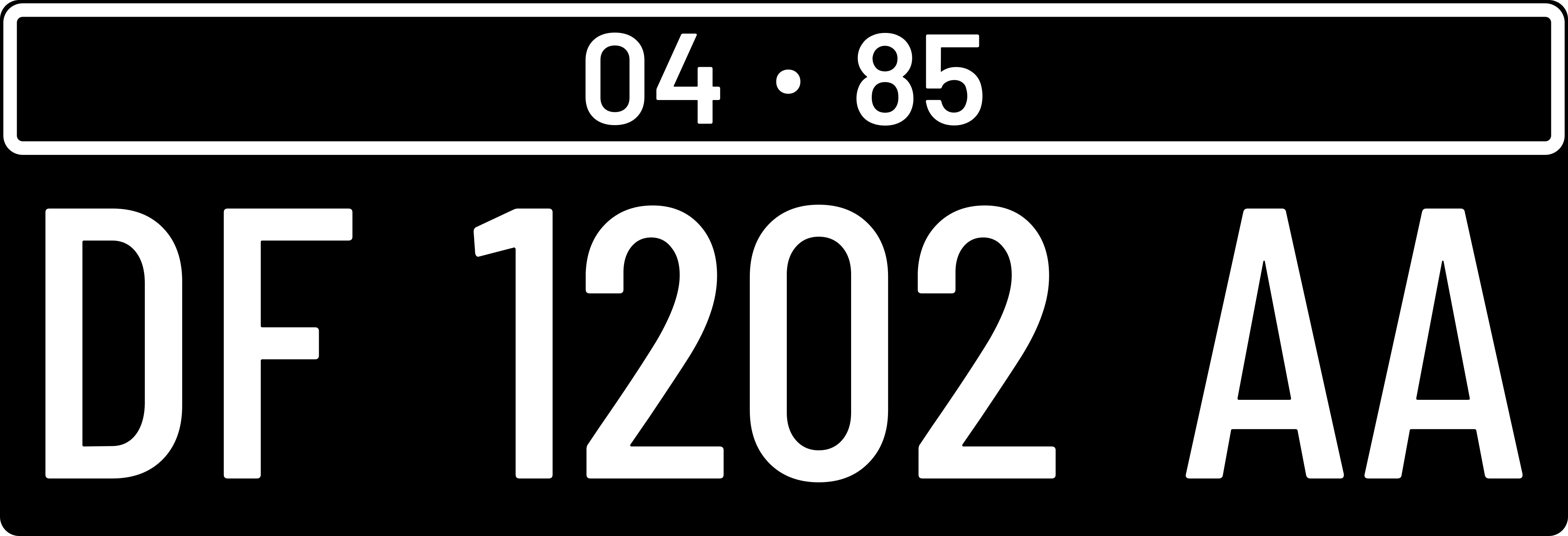
The design of the registration plates during the Indonesian occupation of East Timor from 1976 until 1999. The plate has the DF regional code and expiry date above or below the registration numbers (04•85, means until April 1985)

Following its invasion and occupation by Indonesia in 1975, East Timor (known as Timor Timur in Indonesian) was declared the country's 27th province. As a result, the letters DF were used for registrations in East Timor. This format was used until 1999, following independence from Indonesia.
