= Family Relations Register (South Korea) =

The Family Relations Register of the Republic of Korea (Korean: 가족관계등록부) is an official family register that is used since 2008, replacing the Hoju system that was in use before 2007. In accordance with the Constitutional Court's ruling in 2005 that the previous household system was unconstitutional for violating the constitutional spirit of gender equality, the Act on the Registration of Family Relations, etc. was enacted as Act No. 8435 on May 17, 2007, and went into effect on January 1, 2008. Unlike the previous household register, which was created by family unit centered on the household, the Family Relations Register is created by individual.

== Types ==
There are different types of certificates that are issued from the Family Relations Register in addition to the basic certificate:

- Basic Information Certificate: Information about the applicant's birth, death, and loss of citizenship.
- Family Relationship Certificate (General): Personal information of parents, spouse, and children from current marriages alive.
- Family Relationship Certificate (Detailed): Personal information of parents, spouse, and all children
- Basic Certificate (General): Information on birth, death, and loss of nationality
- Basic Certificate (Detailed): All information related to parental authority, name change, guardianship, acquisition and restoration of nationality, etc., including the contents of the general certificate
- Marriage Relationship Certificate (General): Personal information of current spouse, information related to marriage and divorce
- Marriage Relationship Certificate (Detailed): Personal information of all spouses, information related to marriage and divorce
- Adoption Relationship Certificate (General): Personal information of adoptive parents and adoptee, information related to current adoption and dissolution
- Adoption Relationship Certificate (Detailed): Personal information of adoptive parents and adoptee, information related to all adoption and dissolution
- Adoptive Parent-Adoption Relationship Certificate (General): Personal information of biological parents, adoptive parents, and adoptee, information related to current adoption and dissolution Regarding matters
- Adoption Relationship Certificate (Detailed): Personal information of biological parents, adoptive parents, and adoptive child, mother
