= Vehicle registration plates of Cape Verde =

Cabo Verde
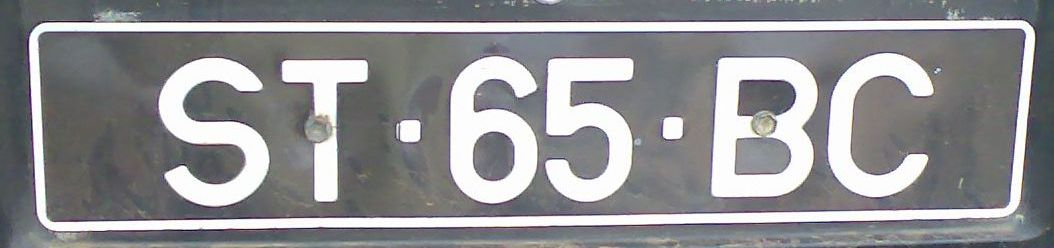
- Cape Verdian regular legal standard number plate.
- Country: Cape Verde
- Country code: None

Current series
- Size: 520 mm × 110 mm 20.5 in × 4.3 in
- Serial format: AB-12-CD
- Colour (front): White on Black
- Colour (rear): White on Black

The license plates in Cape Verde have been derived from the former colonial power Portugal.

== Old System ==
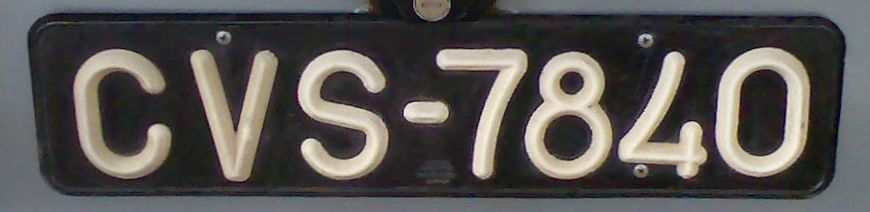
An old-style car registration of Cape Verde.

Previously, Cape Verde used the Portuguese Overseas Territories system, cars in Cape Verde had registrations of the type CVx-1234, where the x was either S (Ilhas de Sotavento) or B (Ilhas de Barlavento). Sotavento and Barlavento are the two island groups that make up Cape Verde. Plates were black with white letters.

== New System ==
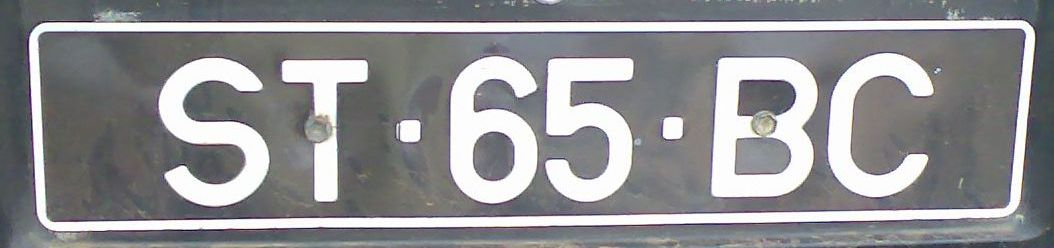
The current standard format of Cape Verde registration plates. ST=Island of Santiago.

A military registration plate (FA).

A diplomatic car registration plate.

The modern system keeps the colours of the old system (white letters on black ground), but the registration code is now different for each island. The codes are:
BR - Brava
BV - Boa Vista
FG - Fogo

MA - Maio
SA - Santo Antão
SL - Sal
SN - São Nicolau
ST - Santiago
SV - São Vicente

The format is AB-12-CD, where AB is the regional code. Vehicles of the Armed Forces bear registration plates of the type "FA-12-34".

Diplomatic plates are white with red letters and usually have the format "CD-12-345" where the first number block stands for the represented country, e.g. 16 for the USA. Vehicles of the United Nations have "CD-ONU-123".

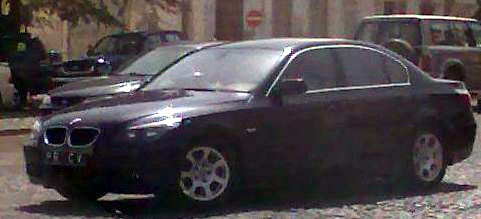
The president's car (registration PR CV) in Praia.

Motor cycles of the municipal administration of Praia have white-on-black plates of the format "CMP 12" where CMP stands for "Câmara Municipal da Praia".

In adaption to the European system, registration plates can also be decorated with variations of the national flag of Cape Verde on the left. The font of the plates (at least of private vehicles) can be freely chosen.

The official car of the president of the republic is registered as "PR CV". Other government vehicles have yellow plates with black letters, sometimes with the letter "G" added at the end.

For special vehicles, green and red plates with white letters are issued.

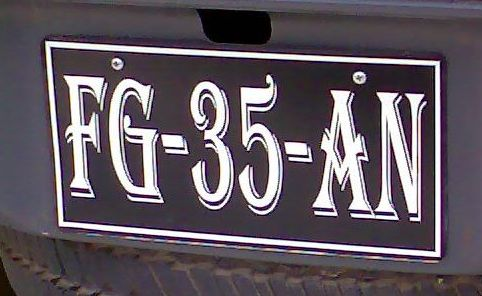
A free-font registration plate from FG=Island of Fogo.

A governmental car registration of Cape Verde.
