= ICivil =

iCivil is a CRVS (civil registration and vital statistics) system used in Burkina Faso since August 2015. It sequentially allows the declaration, recording, and addition of civil status certificates (birth, marriage, divorce) in a central place. It is not needed to travel far to register a birth or to obtain an extract of a birth certificate later.

The system uses wristbands with bubble tags to protect the unique ID number given at birth and an encrypted SMS to send information to civil status where records are kept.

According to UNICEF, there are almost 230 million children younger than five years old not registered, who are known as ghost children. Resolving the problem of ghost children is a challenge in Africa.
