= Anagrafe nazionale della popolazione residente =

The Anagrafe nazionale della popolazione residente (Italian for National register office for the resident population), also known by the acronym ANPR, is the national register office of Italy. It is maintained by the Ministry of the Interior of Italy.

It was created by article 62 of decree 82/2005 (Code for Digital Administration, or Codice dell’Amministrazione Digitale).

The local register offices held by each of Italy's roughly 8,000 Comuni are due to gradually merge into ANPR.

The decision to set up a single centralized database was motivated by several needs:

- avoiding duplication of communication between different bodies within the public administration;
- guaranteeing greater certainty and quality to the register data, through univocal national standards;
- automating and supplanting written communications between administrations, for example in the cases of residence changes, emigration, immigration, censuses, and so on.

The merging of 7,903 municipal registry offices into ANPR has been completed on the 18th January 2022, representing a total of 67,379,385 citizens (61,517,542 resident and 5,861,843 abroad).
