= Familienbuch =

Family register of Germany

A Familienbuch (German: [faˈmiːli̯ənˌbuːx], "Family-book") was a family register, a genealogical summary that was issued in Germany by the local civil registry upon marriage and contained data on birth, marriage and death of the couple as well as the birth data of any children stemming for this marriage.

Their origins can be traced back to late medieval and early modern manuscripts which incorporated historical information about town life in additional to family records. Familienbücher were first introduced nationwide with the registry offices on January 1, 1875.

From January 1, 1958, it was modified: Marriage entry was done by the local civil registry, but the "book" itself which was a paper then was moved to the local civil registry when the family did a removal.

Since January 1, 2009, Familienbücher have no longer been issued.
