= Penal Code (South Korea) =

South Korean criminal law code

National Assembly of South Korea
- Territorial extent: South Korea
- Enacted: Sept 18, 1953
- Commenced: Oct 3, 1953
- Status: Amended

- Penal Code
- Hangul: 형법
- Hanja: 刑法
- RR: Hyeongbeop
- MR: Hyŏngpŏp

The Penal Code or Criminal Act (형법) is the criminal code in South Korea. The Code came into force on 3 October 1953, replacing the Penal Code of Japan, which had until then been in effect during the era under Japanese rule.

== History ==
During the Joseon era, criminal laws generally followed traditional Chinese laws while reflecting Joseon and neo-Confucianism ideologies. In 1905 during the Korean Empire, the Hyung-Pub-Tai-Chun was enacted to modernize criminal law. The code, initiated by the Japanese, was influenced by older traditional Chinese laws and the former Japanese Criminal Code of 1882. In 1912, the Governor-General of Korea declared the Chosun Criminal Order (조선형사령) and on April 4, the Penal Code of Japan and Criminal justice system of Japan came into force in Korea. After liberation in 1945 and to meet the popular demand for repeal of Japanese legislation, the current code was enacted after the Korean War ceasefire on 18 September 1953 and came into force on 3 October 1953

The Penal Code enacted in 1953 was mostly a translation of the Japanese criminal code. As time passed, South Korea's Penal Code became more subjective than its inspiration. The South Korean Penal Code has stronger penalties than its precursor, excluding robbery and other property crimes. Punishments were stricter on laws regarding government rights and almost all laws include punishments for preparing a criminal act.

== Types of punishment ==
Punishments included capital punishment, Imprisonment with hard labor, Imprisonment, disqualification, loss of rights, fines, minor fines, and confiscation of property.

Imprisonment with hard labor is classified as an Indefinite imprisonment or a definite imprisonment. Definite imprisonments are longer than 1 month and less than 30 years. However, in the case of an additional punishment, sentences can extend to 50 years.

== Parts ==
The penal code of Korea is composed of two parts, containing general regulations and crime-specific regulations. The general regulations have four parts:

- Application scope of Criminal law
- Crime
- Punishment
- Duration

The crime specific regulations consists of:

- conspiracy of a rebellion
- conspiracy of the foreign troubles
- crime about the national flag
- crime about diplomatic relations
- infringement of public peace
- crime about explosive materials
- crime about a duty of Public Officials
- interference with a government official in the exercise on his dutyoutl
- a fugitive and a concealment of the criminal
- the perjury and the destruction of evidence
- the calumny (the false charge)
- spoil a dead body and a burial ground
- the incendiarism and an accidental fire
- crime about irrigation and water control
- infringement of the traffic
- crime about drinking water (poisoning into water)
- crime about illegal drugs
- crime about currency (a counterfeit)
- crime about a check, a bond, a stock (forgery)
- forgery of a document (public and private)
- the forgery of a seal
- crime about adultery

== See also ==
- Civil Code of Republic of Korea
- Constitution of South Korea
