= Hoju =

Family registration system in Korea

Hoju (Korean: 호주; Hanja: 戶主; lit. household head) or hojuje (호주제; 戶主制) is a family register system formerly employed in Korea. The register itself is referred to as the hojeok (Korean: 호적; Hanja: 戶籍; MR: hojŏk). The system remained in effect in North Korea until approximately 1955 and in South Korea until 2008. It was similar to other family registries used in East Asia, such as the Chinese hukou and the Japanese koseki. Although the hoju system with its specific focus on registering families under a head of household is no longer in use, both North and South Korea continue to maintain family registers.

The first iteration of the hoju system was the minjeok system of the late Korean Empire, adopted in 1909. Hojeok came into use under Japanese rule in 1922. This system remained in force in South Korea until 1960, when it was replaced by the country's own Hojeok Act.

The limited information on North Korean family registration law indicates that North Korea likely abolished this system in 1955 under the Regulation on Citizen Identity Registration (Korean: 공민의 신분등록에 관한 규정) adopted in that year. By the 21st century, North Korean reference works used the terms hojeok and hoju only in a historical sense, and North Korean refugees reported that although births and changes in family relations were required to be reported to the government there was no comparable public registry.

In the 21st century the hoju system came under criticism in South Korea. Opponents considered it innately patriarchal and a violation of the right to gender equality. It was opposed by both feminists and by representatives of religious traditions including Buddhism and Christianity. Conservative groups led by the National Action Campaign opposed abolishing the system, in part on the grounds that doing so would follow North Korea's example. On 3 February 2005, the Constitutional Court held that the hoju system was incompatible with the guarantees of Article 36 Paragraph 1 of the Constitution of South Korea.

The hoju system was replaced by the modern Family Relations Register through a reform of the Civil Code of South Korea in 2008.

== Works cited ==
- Lee, Eun-jung (2016). 북한의 신분등록․공민등록․주민등록제도 - 가족관계등록을 중심으로 - [The Identity Registration, Citizen Registration, and Civil Registration Systems of North Korea ― With a focus on registration of family relations ―]. 안암법학 (51): 185–229. doi:10.22822/alr..51.201609.185.
