= Civil Code of the Republic of Korea =

South Korean legislation

The Civil Code of the Republic of Korea (South Korea) was passed in 1958 as Law No. 471 and is known in South Korea as one of the three fundamental laws, the other two being Criminal law and constitution. It is made up of five parts, Part I (general provisions), Part II (real rights), Part III (claims), Part IV (relatives), and Part V (inheritance).

== History ==
The South Korean Civil Code is the largest code among South Korean law. During the period of Japanese rule (1910-1945), Japanese civil code was used, but family law and succession law partially followed Korean customary rules. After the establishment of the South Korean government, the Committee of Law Compilation (법률편찬위원회) proceed to legislate civil code and other codes in 1948 and completed in 1953. The South Korean government supplied the draft to the legislature in 1954, which then passed the civil code into law in 1957 after some amendments, mostly relating to the family law.

After it was enacted, the South Korean civil code has been modified seven times. Especially in family law, patriarchal system of family law was abolished in order to achieve the equality of the sexes in 1990. For example, in the area of child custody, both parents came to have equal rights, and the household registration system (호주제, hojuje) was abolished as unconstitutional.

== Contents ==
=== Part 1: General Provisions ===
General provisions (민법총칙) is a basic principle applying to the substantive law, according to the "Pandekten system". In the section of source of law, customary law and sound reasoning are also considered as source of law (Article 1). "Trust and good faith rule" is also stated in article 2.

General provisions consists of seven chapters:

1. Common provisions (source of law)
2. Persons
  - capacity
  - domicile
  - absence and disappearance
3. Juristic persons
  - incorporation
  - organization
  - dissolution
  - penal provisions
4. Things
5. Juristic acts
  - general provision
  - declaration of intention
  - agency
  - nullity and voidance
  - conditions and time
6. Period
7. Extinctive prescription

=== Part 2: Property Rights ===
Property rights (물권법) are influenced by Roman law and German law, but the "right to registered lease on deposit basis" (chonsegwon) has the most strong indigenous features. According to article 303, any person having chonsegwon is entitled to use it in conformity with its purposes and to take the profits from it by paying the deposit money and possessing the real property owned by another person.

In customary rule, customary superficies, right of grave base are also applied except nine rights written in the real rights part. In real estate, effect of changes in real rights is only valid by registration. This is because the rights and relations of real estate can be clear by the registration which serves the security of real estate contract.

Real rights consists of General Provisions (chapters 1 - 3) and Servitude (chapters 4 - 7):

1. Possessory right
2. Ownership (limitation of ownership, acquisition of ownership, joint ownership)
3. Superficies
4. Right to registered lease on deposit basis, ‘Chonsegwon’,
5. Right of retention,
6. Pledge
  - pledge of movables
  - pledge of rights
7. Mortgage

=== Part 3: Claims ===
Claims (채권법) consists of contract, management of affairs, unjust enrichment and tort. Contract part covers formation of contract, offer and acceptance and the kinds of contracts, gift sale and exchange, etc. In tort part, torts and damages are defined. Korean definition of torts is stated in article 750; "any person who causes losses to or inflicts injuries on another person by an unlawful act, willfully or negligently shall be bound to make compensation for damages arising therefrom".

Claims part consists of five chapters:

1. General provisions
  - subject of claim
  - effect of claim
  - several obliges and obligors
  - assignment of claim
  - assumption of obligation
  - extinction of claim
  - debts and payable order
  - debts payable to bearer
2. Contract
  - general provisions
  - gift
  - sale
  - effect of sale
  - contract of exchange
  - loan for consumption
  - lease
  - contract of employment
  - contract for work
  - advertisement for prize contest
  - mandate
  - bailment
  - partnership
  - life annuity
  - compromise
3. Management of affairs
4. Unjust enrichment
5. Torts

=== Part 4: Relatives ===
In South Korean law, the law on relatives (친족법) and (상속법) inheritance law comprise what is usually referred to as "family law" in legal studies. The law on relatives define marriage, parents and children, adoption, and the like. The Head of family system (호주제도, hojujedo) which gives benefit to the male member of family influenced the most part of South Korean family law before it was abolished by the Constitutional Court in 2005, because it was found to be against equality of sexes and human dignity. Therefore, in 2005, the modified civil code was enacted.

1. General provision
2. Scope of family members and surname and origin of surname of child
3. Marriage
  - matrimonial engagement
  - formation of marriage
  - nullity and annulment of marriage
  - effect of marriage
  - divorce
4. Parents and children
  - children of natural parent
  - adoption
  - parental authority
5. Guardianship
  - duties of guardianship
  - termination of guardianship
6. Family council
7. Support

=== Part 5. Inheritance ===
1. Inheritance
  - general provisions
  - inheritor
  - effects of inheritance
  - acceptance and renunciation of inheritance
  - separation of property
  - absence of inheritor
2. Wills
  - general provisions
  - forms of wills
  - effect of wills
  - execution of wills
  - withdrawal of wills
3. Legal reserve of inheritance
