= Vehicle registration plates of Portugal =

Portuguese Republic
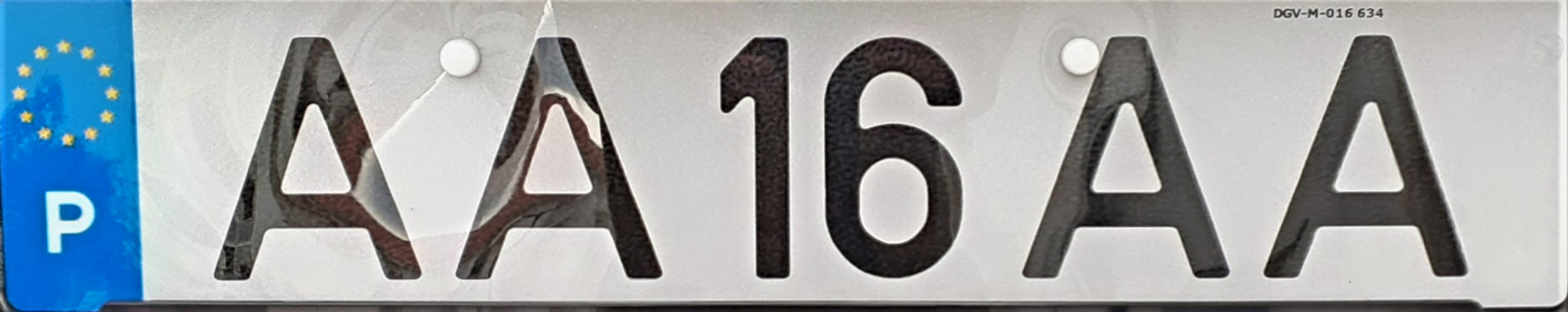
- Current regular legal standard number plate from Portugal
- Country: Portugal
- Country code: P

Current series
- Size: 520 mm × 110 mm 20.5 in × 4.3 in
- Serial format: Not standard
- Colour (front): Black on White
- Colour (rear): Black on White

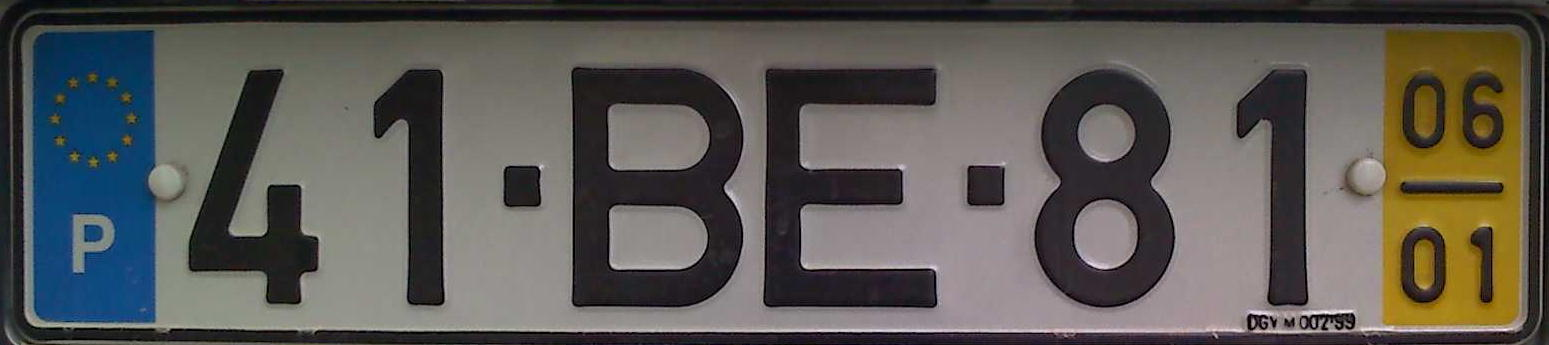
2005-2020 licence plate (for a January 2006 registered vehicle)

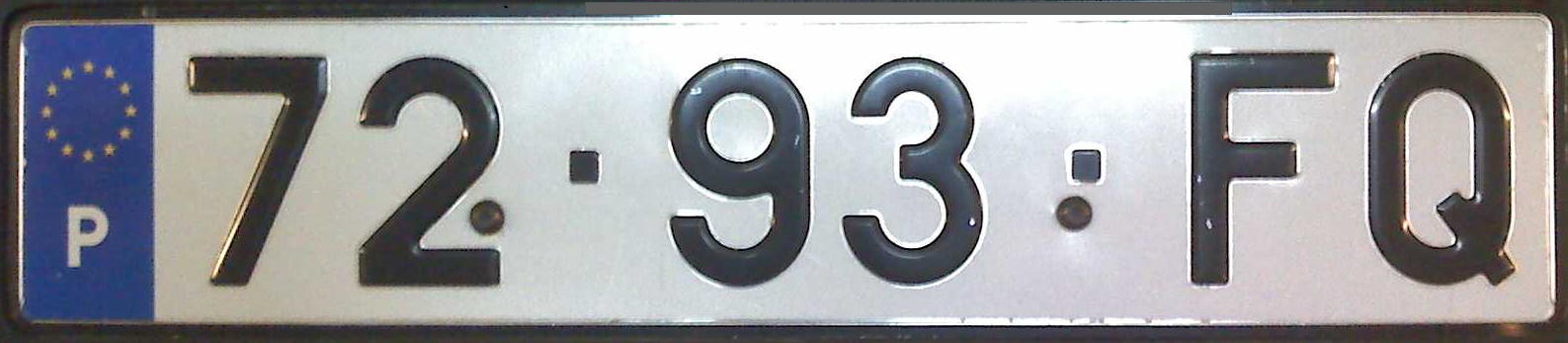
Type of licence plate used between 1992 and 1997

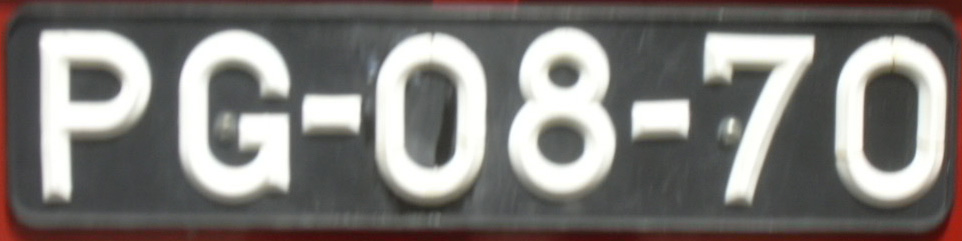
Type of licence plate used until 1992 (white on black)

The Portuguese vehicle registration plate system for automobiles and motorcycles is simple and sequential. The system has no link to geographical locations or similar. It is an incremental numbering system consisting of three groups of two characters, separated by dashes. This system started in 1937 with AA–10–00, which ran out on 29 February 1992. This then went on to 00–01–AA and changed to 00–AA–01 in 2005. This last sequence was exhausted early in 2020, and it was announced on 3 March that it had been replaced by the sequence AA–00–AA. (The first registration issued was actually AA–01–AA, the 00 having been reserved.) Moreover, the letters W and Y, never before used, and the letter K, used only for a short-lived series for imported vehicles in 1997 (see below), are being employed in the new system, meaning that this sequence should last more than six-and-a-half times as long as the previous. At current rates that it would not need replacing at least until the end of the 21st century, but the expected lifetime of the series is stated as being forty-five years.

In 2020 with the change to the AA–01–AA, the yellow ribbon containing the date of first registration is being discontinued due to authorities in other countries mistaking the registration date as an expiration date. In addition, the dashes that separate each block of numbers or letters have been removed from the new plate format. Owners of vehicles that need replacement plates will be able to choose whether such plates are produced according to either the old or new format.

== Colours ==
Licence plate formats from 1932 to 2020

Initially there were white characters on a black background. In 1992, the design was changed to one of black characters on a white background in metal or fibreglass; in that same year, the European blue ribbon was added with the Portuguese 'P' denominator. In 1998, a yellow ribbon on the right side was added with the month and year in which the car was first registered (e.g. 99/12 for December 1999; the year comes on top of the month). This was different from systems such as in Germany (where the numbers indicate the start and end month of the vehicle's registration) and more similar to systems such as in Italy (where the date indicates the year of vehicle registration). Note that the date is that of first-ever registration of the vehicle, not the date the vehicle was registered in Portugal. Some vehicles carry plates that have a year and month seemingly out of tune with the alphanumeric sequence, and the reason for this is that these are imported used vehicles. The yellow ribbon has been discontinued with the introduction of the new format in 2020.

== Special registration plates ==
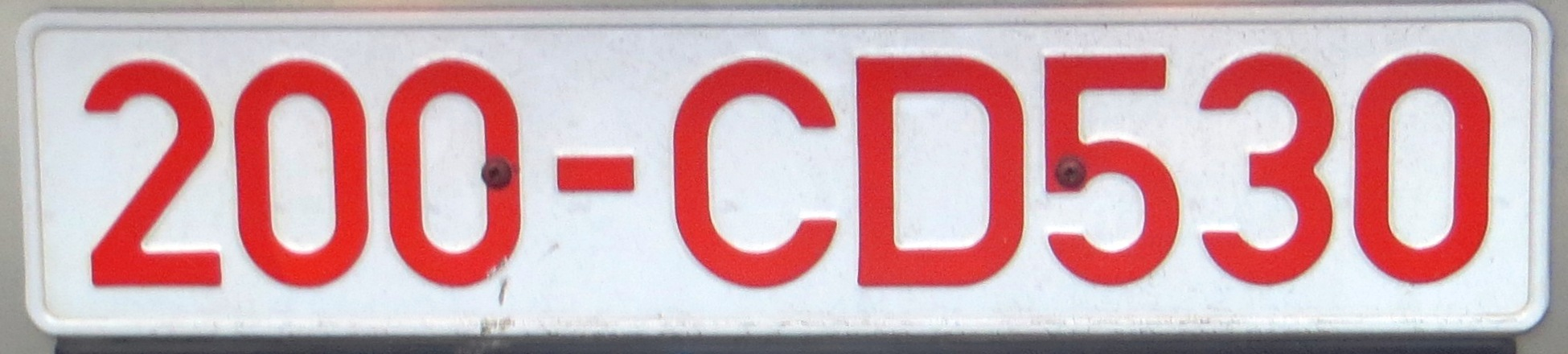
Diplomatic plate

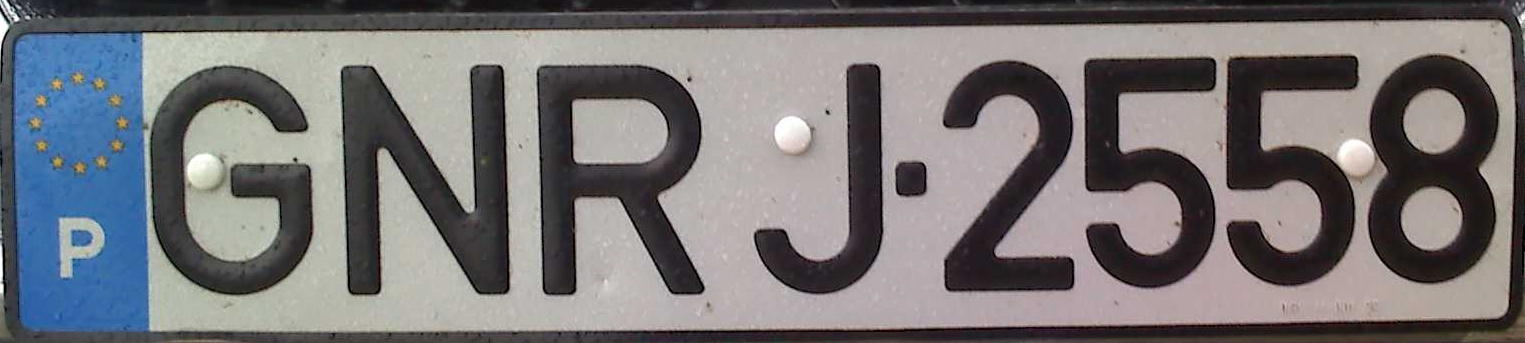
Portuguese National Republican Guard

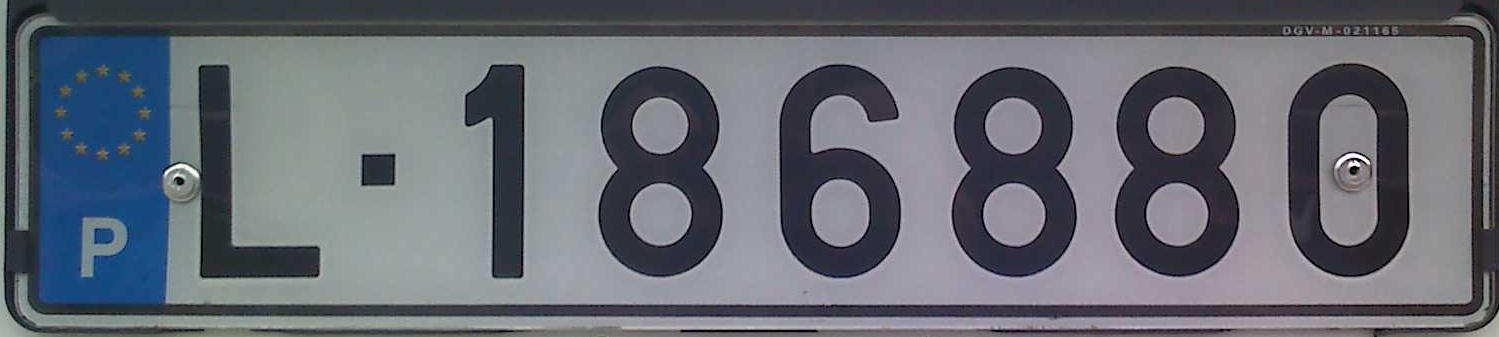
Trailer plate

- The sequences MG–00–00, ME–00–00 and MX–00–00 are only used by Portuguese Army vehicles. Tactical vehicles continue to use the old model of plates with black background and white letters and numbers.
- The sequence AP–00–00 is only used by Portuguese Navy vehicles.
- The sequence AM–00–00 is only used by Portuguese Air Force vehicles.
- The sequence 00–01–KA to 80–79–KF was used for second hand imported vehicles in 1997. The letters K, Y and W were not used before as they were not part of the Portuguese alphabet at the time.
- The Portuguese National Republican Guard uses the special sequence GNR A–01 to GNR Z–9999 in which the letter after the GNR identifies the type of vehicle (e.g. B for armoured vehicle, J for off-roader, L for patrol vehicle, T for traffic, etc.)
- Diplomatic vehicles use the sequences 000–CD000 (diplomats), 000–CC000 (consular personnel) and 000–FM000 (non-diplomatic embassy personnel) in which the first group of three numbers identify the country, with red characters on white and without the European blue ribbon.
- New, unregistered vehicles for sale use special plates with the name of the dealer followed by an identification number, with white characters on red and without the European blue ribbon.
- Trailers use another sequence which consist of two groups of characters separated by a dash. The first with one or two letters is the code of the regional registering office. The second is a sequential registration number with up to six digits.
- Vehicles for exportation use an inverse sequence of the trailers, first the registration number and second the office code. In this vehicles the letters "EXP" are placed in the yellow ribbon above the date.
- Industrial machines use the same sequence as cars and motorcycles but with black characters on red. These vehicles have a symbol indicating commercial class in the yellow ribbon rather than the year and month of registration.
- Duty unpaid vehicles use two groups of characters separated by a dash. The first is a sequential number up to five digits while the second is a letter. The year band is white, the colour is yellow like Netherlands vehicle registration plates.
- Iberlant NATO Base plates had a blue background with a yellow font and the sequence IBL–00–00.
- NATO plates start with NATO and followed by four numbers.

== Plates of the US Forces in Portugal (Lajes AFB, Azores) ==
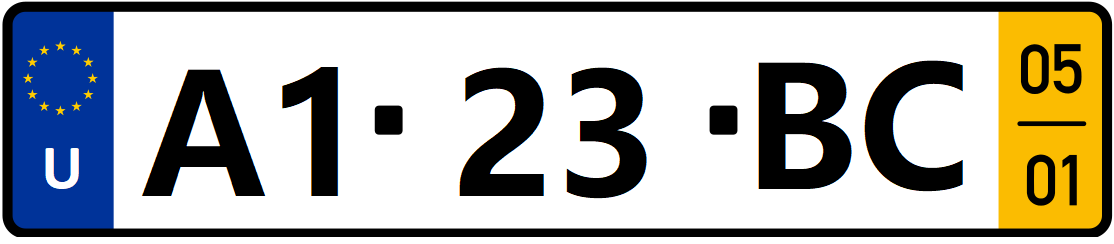
Plates used by the US forces in Portugal, specifically in Lajes (Terceira), Autonomous Region of the Azores.

Unlike US forces stationed in other countries on the European continent, US forces in Portugal do not have plates with the same format as their host country. Instead, servicemembers and other US military personnel are issued unique plate series, with a A1-23-BC format. Additionally, rather than the international road code 'P', these plates display a unique 'U' on the blue Euroband, joined by the EU flag on top.

== District codes ==
Trailers and vehicles for export have the following district code letters in their licence plates:

- A – Ponta Delgada (Azores)
- AN – Angra do Heroismo
- AV – Aveiro
- BE – Beja
- BG – Bragança
- BR – Braga
- C – Coimbra
- CB – Castelo Branco
- E – Évora
- FA – Faro
- GD – Guarda
- H – Horta
- L – Lisbon
- LE – Leiria
- M – Funchal (Madeira)
- P – Porto
- PT – Portalegre
- SA – Santarém
- SE – Setúbal
- VC – Viana do Castelo
- VR – Vila Real
- VI – Viseu

Until the 1970s only the codes A, AN, C, H, L, M and P were used. After that, other registration offices were created with new codes.

The following special codes are also used for trailers:

- D – Diplomatic
- F – non-diplomatic embassy.

== History ==
=== 1901–1911 ===
Local registration plates were issued from 1901 onwards by the districts civil governors offices and usually consisted of the full name or the abbreviation for the district followed by a serial number. (e.g. "LISBOA 123" or "L.^{XA} 123" for a vehicle registered in Lisbon).

=== 1911–1936 ===
A national car registration system was established in 1911. The country was divided into zones (North, Centre, South, and, from 1918, the Azores and Madeira), each having an identification number sequence for the licence plates, which was N–000, C–000, S–000, A–000 and M–000 respectively. Hire cars had a letter A added after the registration (e.g. S–4226–A) and provisionally registered vehicles had WW added (e.g. S–1703–WW). The plates had a black background with white letters and numbers.

By the mid-1930s so many vehicles had already been registered, especially in the South Zone (which included Lisbon), that the identification numbers have already reached five digits. As this represented a challenge for the identification of vehicles by the authorities, the system was changed. However, in the Azores and Madeira it persisted until 1962.

=== 1937–1992 ===
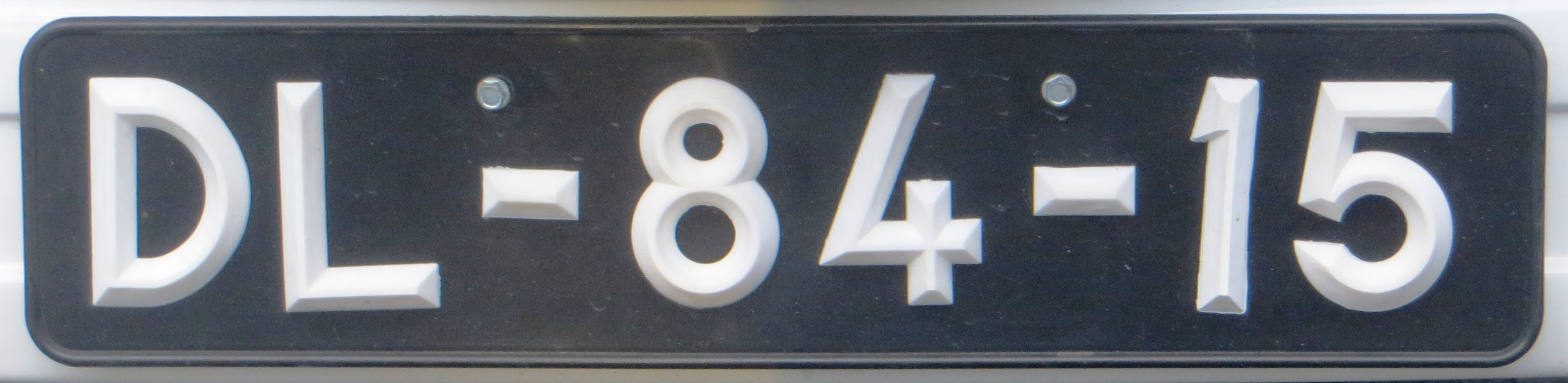
Type of licence plate issued between 1937 and 1992

On 1 January 1937, the second national car registration system came into force. This consisted of the sequence AA–10–00 to ZZ–99–99. The sequencing by zones was maintained, with the letters AA to LZ reserved for the South (Lisbon), MA to TZ for the North (Porto) and UA to ZZ for the Center (Coimbra). The plates continued to have a black background with white letters and numbers.

Vehicles registered under the previous system had to change to the new one. In Lisbon, the vehicles of series S–000 and S–1000 changed to series AA–00–00, those of S–10000 to AB–00–00, those of S–20000 to AC–00–00 and those of S–30000 to AD–00–00. In Porto, the changes were from N–000 and N–1000 to MM–00–00 and from N–10000 to MN–00–00. In Coimbra, all vehicles changed to the series UU–00–00. In doing so, re-registered vehicles kept the last four digits that they had had under the old system so that e.g. C–123 changed to UU–01–23, N–1234 to MM–12–34 and S–12345 to AB–23–45.

The letters MG, and later, ME and MX were reserved for the Army, AP for the Navy, AM for the Air Force and EP for government ministries. The letters CD, CC and FM were reserved for diplomatic vehicles (respectively for diplomatic, consular and non-diplomatic personnel), but with red characters on a white background. The letters TA, TB and TC, in red plates with white characters were reserved for temporary licences respectively in Lisbon, Porto and Coimbra. National Republican Guard and the former Fiscal Guard had special sequences beginning respectively with the letters GNR and GF.

In the Azores and Madeira the new system was only adopted in 1962. The Azores were divided into three registration districts: Ponta Delgada, Angra do Heroísmo and Horta. The letters AN were reserved for Angra, AR and AS for Ponta Delgada and HO for Horta. For Madeira the groups MA and MD were reserved. The white letters on red TD, TG, TH and TF were for temporary licences respectively in Ponta Delgada, Angra, Horta and Madeira.

In the 1970s, new district registration offices were opened, and letters reserved for them: EM and EV for Évora, ZA and ZB for Braga, ZC and ZD for Vila Real, ZE and ZF for Aveiro, ZG and ZH for Guarda, ZI and ZL for Santarém, ZM and ZN for Setúbal and ZO and ZP for Faro. As Évora was considered a central office it also had a temporary licence code: TE. However, as the zonal registration system was abandoned relatively soon afterwards, most of these sequences were not used as zonal identifiers.

In the early 1980s the reservation of letter sequences by zone was discontinued, and vehicles were registered sequentially at a national level, so that letter combinations previously reserved for Porto and Coimbra might be seen on vehicles registered in the Lisbon offices of the National Registration Office.

Sequences with the letters CU, FD and OO, were originally not used, the first two because they coincided with taboo slang words (CU – "arse", FD – Portuguese abbreviation for "fuck") and the last to avoid confusion with 00 (zero, zero). Later, however, The CU sequence was used in 1982 on Lisbon registered vehicles and OO in 1966, 1967, 1978, 1979 and 1982 on Porto registered vehicles.

In 1985, diplomatic plates adopted the format 000–CD000, 000–CC000 or 000–FM000, with the first three numbers a country identifier, and the last three sequential.

=== 1992–2020 ===
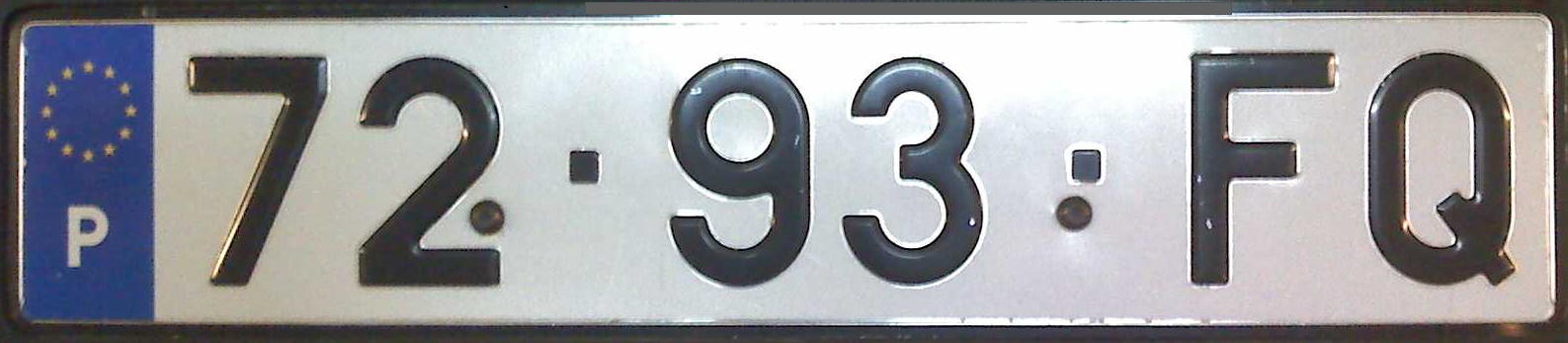
Type of licence plate issued between 1992 and 2005, before the introduction of the yellow ribbon in 1998.

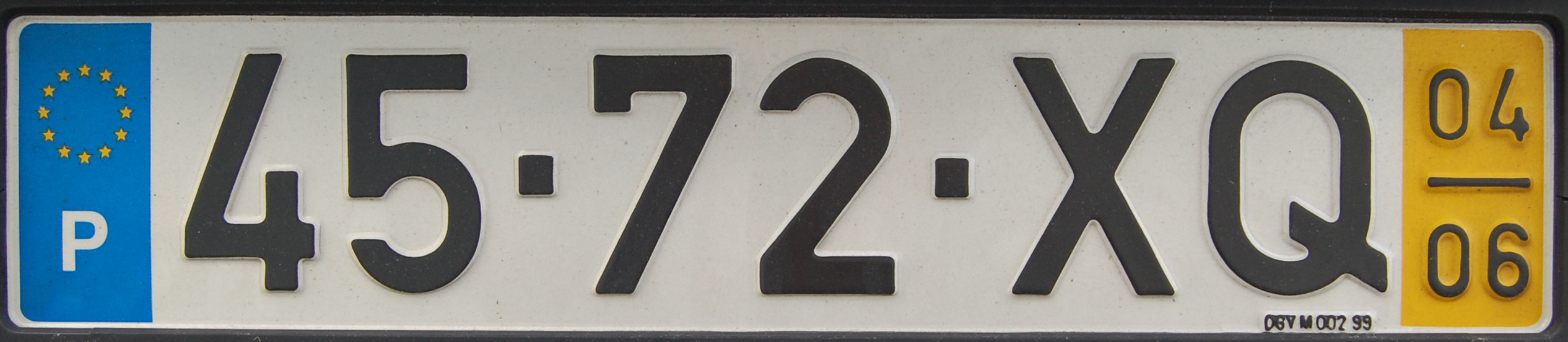
Type of licence plate with yellow ribbon (for a June 2004 registered vehicle) issued between 1998 and 2020.

In March 1992, the AA–00–00 format came to an end and was succeeded by the genuinely national-level 00–00–AA sequence. The type of plate also changed to black characters on a reflective white background, with the blue ribbon, with the emblem of the European Communities (now Union) on the left-hand side and the letter P as a country identifier. Under this new sequence no combination of letters was reserved for specific entities or areas. However, in 1997 the combinations KA to KZ, the first letter of which sequence does not occur in the Portuguese alphabet and so had not previously been used, were given over to preregistered imported vehicles. The groups WA to WZ and YA to YZ were likewise reserved for this purpose, but the system was abandoned before these groups being used.

In 1998 a yellow ribbon with the date of the first registration of the vehicle was introduced, placed on the right-hand side of the plate. This was mandatory for all newly registered vehicles, whether new or second-hand imports. In 2005, the 00–00–AA sequence ended, and 00–AA–00 was introduced. The last of the old sequence was 99–ZZ–99 and ended in March 2020. A comprehensive list of the history of sequences from 1956 to mid-2015, in Portuguese, can be found here.

=== 2020–present ===
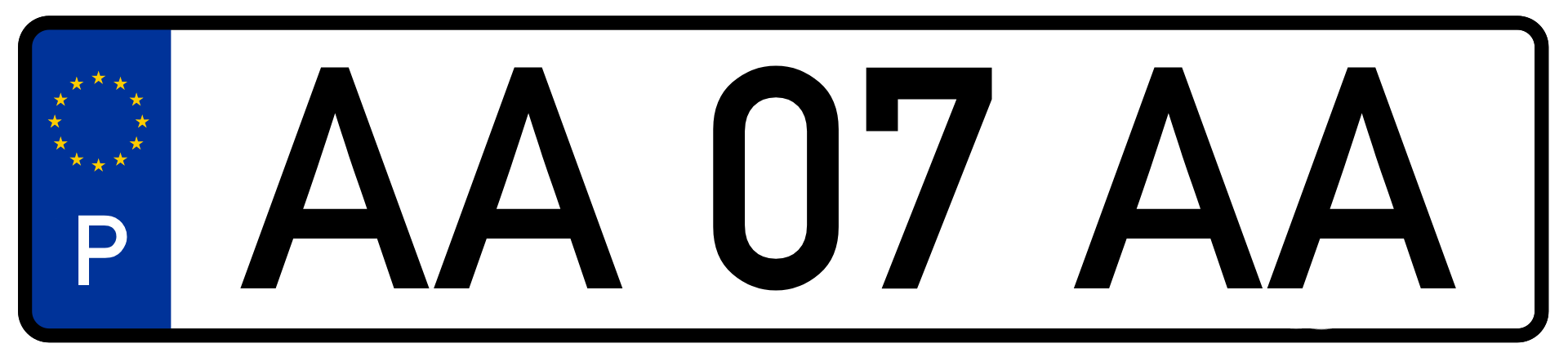
Type of licence plate issued from March 2020

When it ran out, the 00-AA-00 sequency would be followed by the AA-00-AA sequency. This occurred in March 2020.

The change of sequency was however also accompanied by a decision to implement a change in the layout of the plates. The first change was the elimination of the right-hand side yellow ribbon with the date of the vehicle registration. This was justified by the issues Portuguese drivers had to face in some foreign countries, when local police authorities confounded the registration date of their vehicle's plates with a supposed circulation period limit date.

The second change was the elimination of the traditional dashes between the groups of letters and numbers. This was justified by the lack of space in the plates for all the characters if some combinations occur.

It is technically incorrect to say that licence plates are issued. The authorities issue a registration number, and it is then the owner's responsibility to have a standardized plate made up, either of plastic or metal, on production of the appropriate documentation. In the case of new car sales, this is done by the dealer.

== Former Portuguese overseas territories plates ==
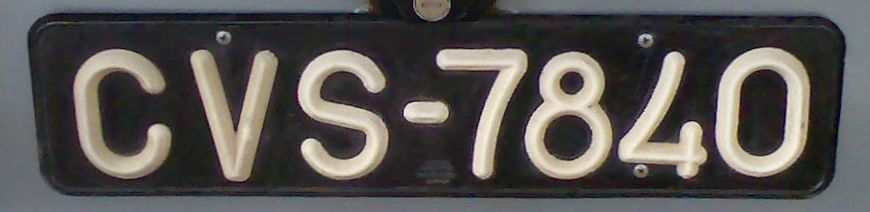
Pre-1950s type Cape Verde plate from the Sotavento registration zone

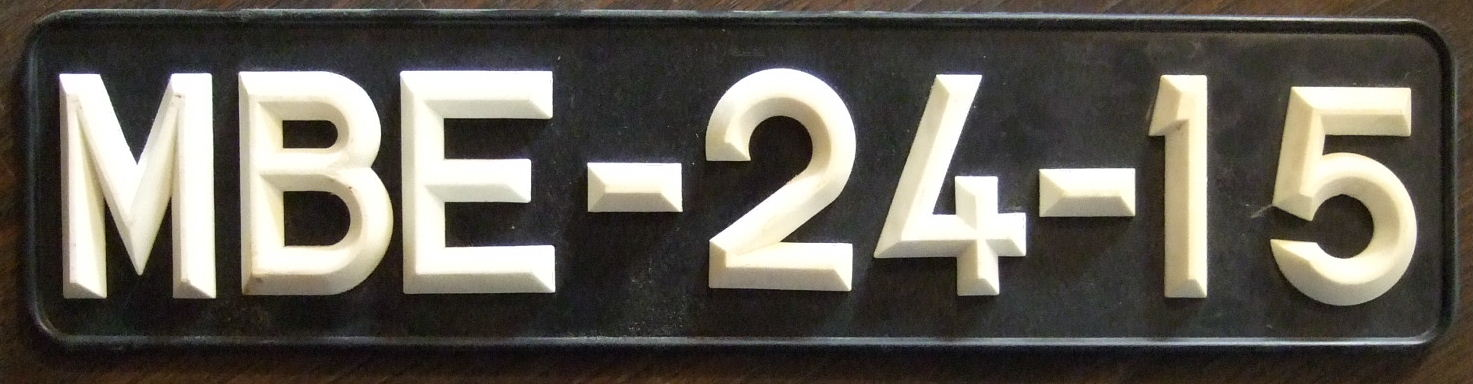
Post 1950s type Mozambique plate, the initial "M" identified the Mozambique overseas province, while the block "BE" was assigned to its Beira registration zone

Angolan plate, 1972

The Portuguese models of car plates were adopted - with the necessary local adaptations - by the then existing overseas territories of Portugal.

At the beginning, the model of 1911 was followed, with each licence plate number consisting of an initial letter or group of letters identifying the registration zone followed by a serial number (e.g. G–1234 for a car registered in Portuguese Guinea or CVS–1235 for one registered in the south-east zone of Cape Verde). While smaller colonies (e.g. Portuguese Guinea) constituted a single registration zone, larger ones (e.g. Angola) were divided in several zones.

In the 1950s and 1960s, the licensing systems of all overseas territories were changed to systems based on the Portuguese one of 1937. By territory the sequences used were:

- Angola: Axx–00–00 – the second and third letters were reserved by district
- Cape Verde: CVx–00–00 – the third letter identified the island group (S: Sotavento, B: Barlavento)
- Portuguese Guinea: G–00–00
- Portuguese India: Ixx–00–00 – the second and third letters were reserved by district (IGA to IGZ for Goa district)
- Macau: M–00–00 and later Mx–00–00 – the second letter was sequential (ME–00–00 numbers did not cause problems as Portugal withdrew its armed forces in the 1970s)
- Mozambique: Mxx–00–00 – the second and third letters were reserved by district
- São Tomé and Príncipe: STP–00–00
- Portuguese Timor: T–00–00 and later TP–00–00

With some minor differences, these systems are still in use in São Tomé and Príncipe, Macau, and Angola. Cape Verde has adapted the system to use different two-letter codes for each island.

== See also ==
- Vehicle registration plates of Europe
- Vehicle registration plates of Macau
