= Superintendent registrar =

Vital registration service statutory officer

The superintendent registrar is a statutory officer of the vital registration service in England and Wales. The Register Office in any location is the office of the Superintendent Registrar who has legal custody of all the birth, marriage and death registers for the local district, is responsible for the legal preliminaries to marriage for residents of the district and who officiates at civil marriages both in the Register Office and at an Approved Premise.
