= Wang Chuyi =

Founder of Yushan lineage in Quanzhen Taoism

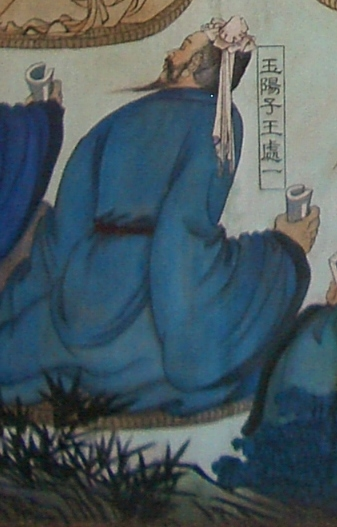
- Traditional Chinese: 王處一
- Simplified Chinese: 王处一
Transcriptions
Standard Mandarin
- Hanyu Pinyin: Wáng Chǔyī
- Wade–Giles: Wang Ch'u-i

Wang Chuyi (1142–1217) was a Taoist master and philosopher. He was one of "The Seven Perfect Ones of the North" or "The Seven Real Taoists", terms used for disciples of Wang Chongyang.

He resided in a cave in Mount Kunyu as a Taoist hermit. He founded the Yushan lineage of the Quanzhen School. According to legend, he resurrected a person by covering his ears and shouting "The Underground Ministry Must Not Receive Him."
