= Kunyu =

Kunyu may refer to:

- Mount Kunyu (崑嵛山), Shandong, China
- Kunyu, Xinjiang (昆玉市), China
