= Taoist temple =

Place of worship in Taoism

temple
- Traditional Chinese: 觀
- Simplified Chinese: 观
- Literal meaning: (orig.) a place to see
Transcriptions
Standard Mandarin
- Hanyu Pinyin: guàn
- Wade–Giles: kuan

Taoist temple
- Traditional Chinese: 道觀
- Simplified Chinese: 道观
Transcriptions
Standard Mandarin
- Hanyu Pinyin: dàoguàn
- Wade–Giles: Tao-kuan

grand temple
- Traditional Chinese: 宮觀
- Simplified Chinese: 宫观
- Literal meaning: palatial temple
Transcriptions
Standard Mandarin
- Hanyu Pinyin: gōngguàn
- Wade–Giles: kung-kuan

grand temple
- Traditional Chinese: 道宮
- Simplified Chinese: 道宫
- Literal meaning: palace of the Tao
Transcriptions
Standard Mandarin
- Hanyu Pinyin: dàogōng
- Wade–Giles: Tao-kung

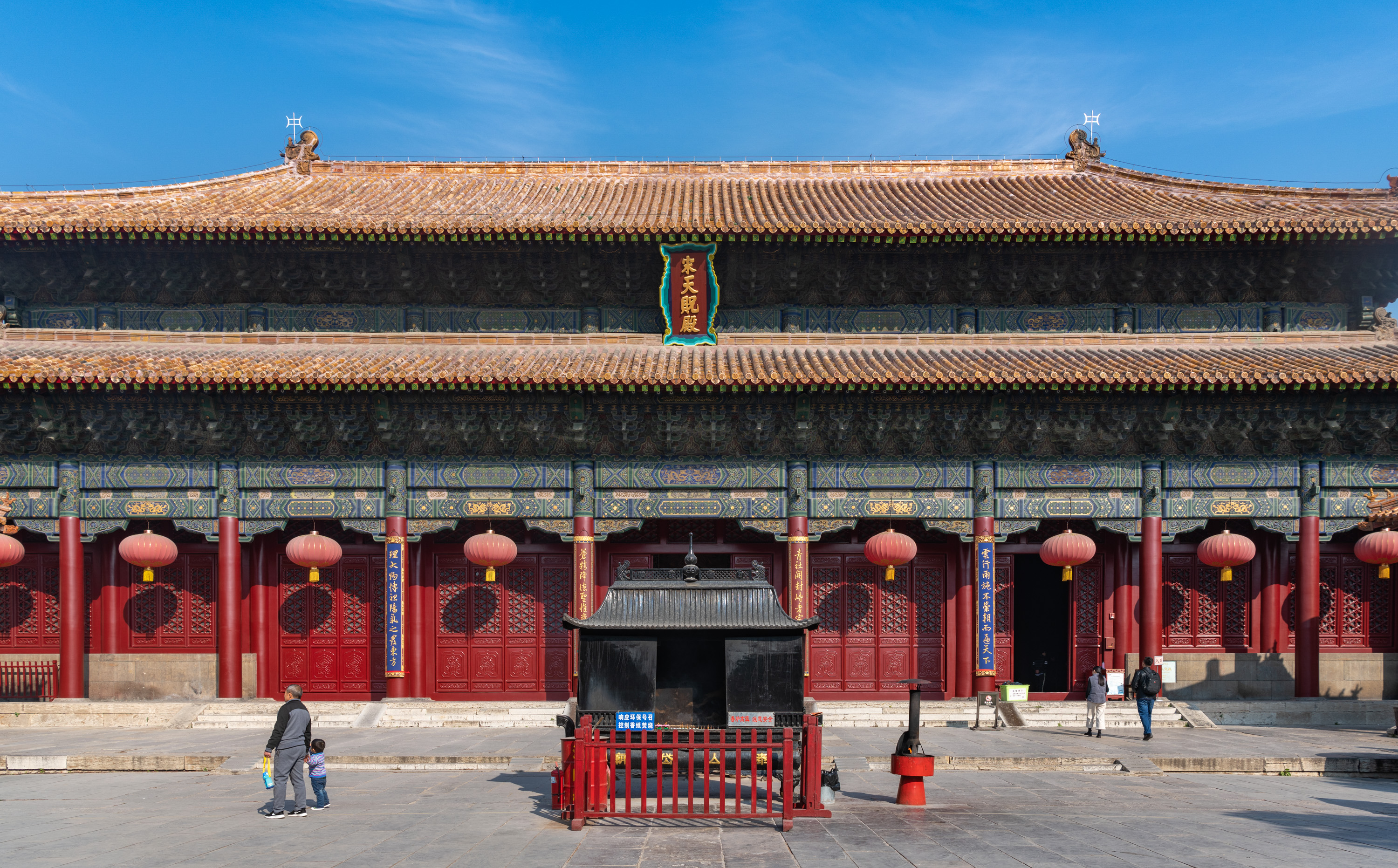
Dai Temple at the foot of Mount Tai, Shandong, China

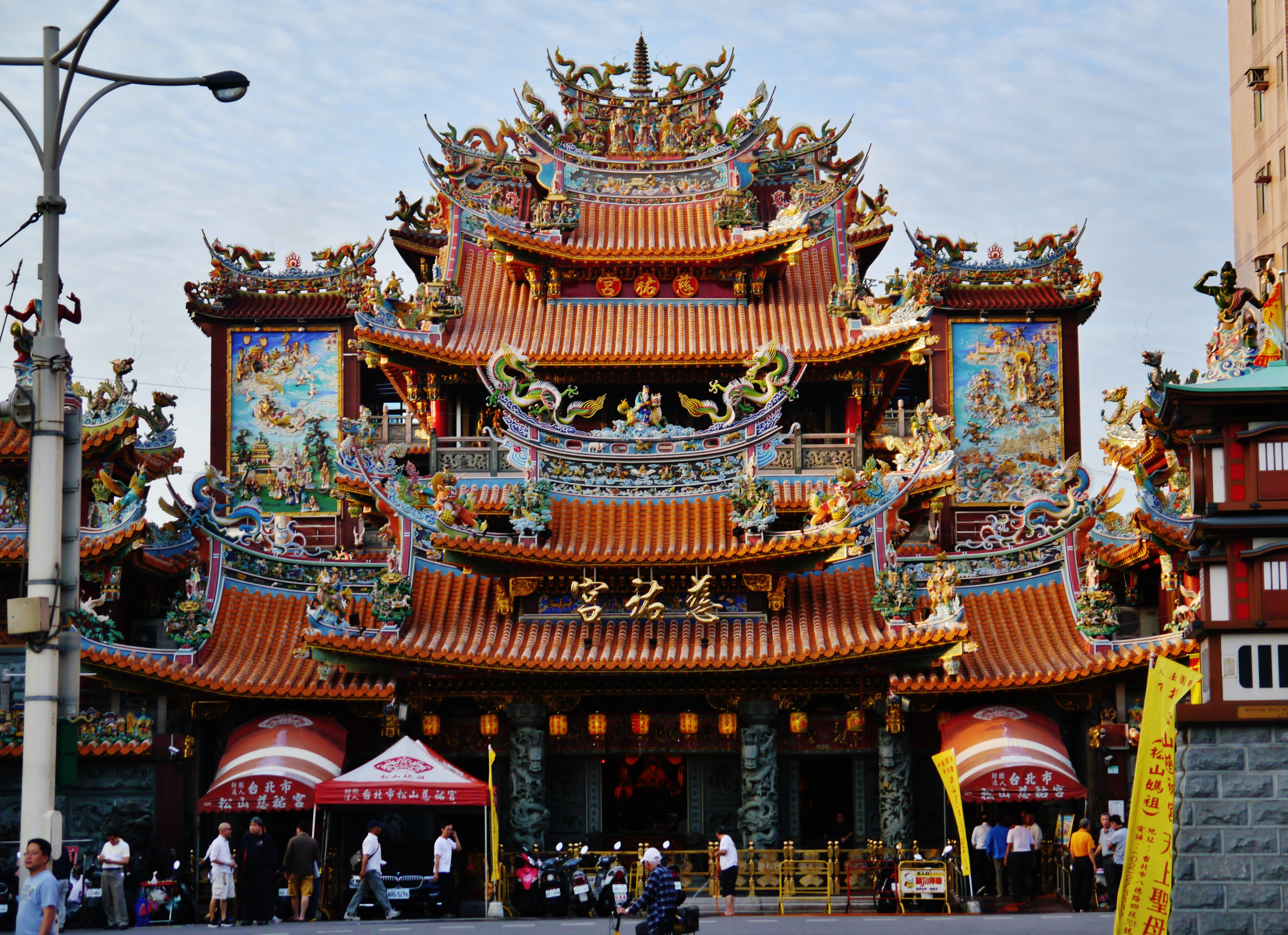
Ciyou Temple, Songshan District, Taipei, Taiwan

A Taoist or Daoist temple, also known by its Chinese names as a guan, daoguan, or gongguan, is a place where the Tao is observed and cultivated. It is a place of worship in Taoism. Taoism is a religion that originated in China, with the belief in immortality, which urges people to become immortal through moral and health cultivation.

Structure and function can vary according to the Taoist school the temple belongs to. For example, guàn of the Quanzhen School are monasteries where celibate daoshi "priests" live.

== History ==
During the Southern Dynasty, under the influence of Buddhist monasteries, monasticism became the new trend, and Taoists were also trying to create a new way of monasticism by emulating the model set by Buddhists. Therefore, many of the Taoist houses were built in a similar pattern to Buddhist monasteries. Although its scale cannot be compared to the Buddhist monasteries, their form and pattern are similar, including the courtyard-like layout, the hall-like architecture, and the enshrining statues. Moreover, large Taoist temples also function as an economic entity, which is also similar to Buddhism. The official Taoist temple has magnificent buildings and different offerings, with halls, statues, gardens, and even industries. It also contains different building spaces for different purposes, for example, the medicine garden and orchard, ponds, and gardens for trees and flowers.

The Taoist temple is a place for Taoists to practice, so monasticism is closely related to where the temple is built. Taoists are asked to cultivate virtues, and believe monasticism can help them get rid of hardship and troubles and lead to a peaceful life. Taoists aim to find a state of tranquility in the psychological and spiritual world. Therefore, monasticism was put in the highest place in Taoism.

== Environment ==
There are many ways to practice Taoism, such as praying, keeping thoughts, nurturing, and internal elixir and external elixir. But no matter what practices they are engaged in, adherents need quiet and inaction. Therefore, temple locations require quiet and freedom from the disturbance of the outer world. To be far away from the noisy and busy cities, most Taoist temples are built in deep forests to practice monasticism. Even though there are Taoist temples in the city, most of them are located in quiet and open spaces like mountains and forests, which is also similar to Buddhist temples.

== Types ==
The palaces of a Taoist temple have two natures: one is the descendant temple (zisun miao), and the other is the jungle temple (conglin miao).

The descendant temples are passed down from generation to generation, from master to disciple, and the temple property can be inherited by an exclusive sect. Taoists from other sects can live in the temple temporarily but cannot interfere with temple affairs. Usually, the new disciples live in the descendant temple.

The jungle temples are not allowed to take in new disciples, and the temple property cannot be inherited and belongs to all Taoist congregations in the world in common. Inspired by Zen Buddhism, Taoism also gradually shifted from the Tang Dynasty to emphasize inner purification and inaction and heavy metaphysics. The Quanzhen school also established the Jungle system of Taoism with reference to the Zen forest system. Jungle temples are generally non-sectarian, and all Taoist Dharma have the right to live in and manage temple affairs. Generally, regardless of age, gender, or duration of monasticism, any Taoist who can reside in it has the right to be elected as the top leader. Taoists who have lived in the jungle temple for a long time are called permanent Taoists. There is a clear division of labor in the temple, commonly known as the “three masters, five masters, and eighteen heads,” who are in charge of sutra teaching, merit-making, security, fasting, staff placement, self-support, cooking, and other matters. Generally, the new disciples first learn this knowledge in the descendant temple, and after three years, they get the crown scarf and permission from the master; then, they can go to the jungle temple to live alone and learn more. After the study, they return again.

In addition, the sect is not determined by which temple the monk leaves home in. Rather, it is decided by the dharma descent, who grants the sect name according to the sect. And after that, wherever one goes, it is the same sect, and one can also live in the temple of descendants or in the jungle temple, as long as it is suitable. Generally, the temple where a new monk lives is the temple of his own sect, but not absolutely, as a rule. After having a master, if an adherent meets a better Taoist priest, they can worship “teacher” again, and don't have to change their descent. The Yellow Emperor studied the Tao and had 72 “masters.” There is only one Taoist master, but Taoists believe the more masters you can have, the better, because it means you are diligent and good at learning.

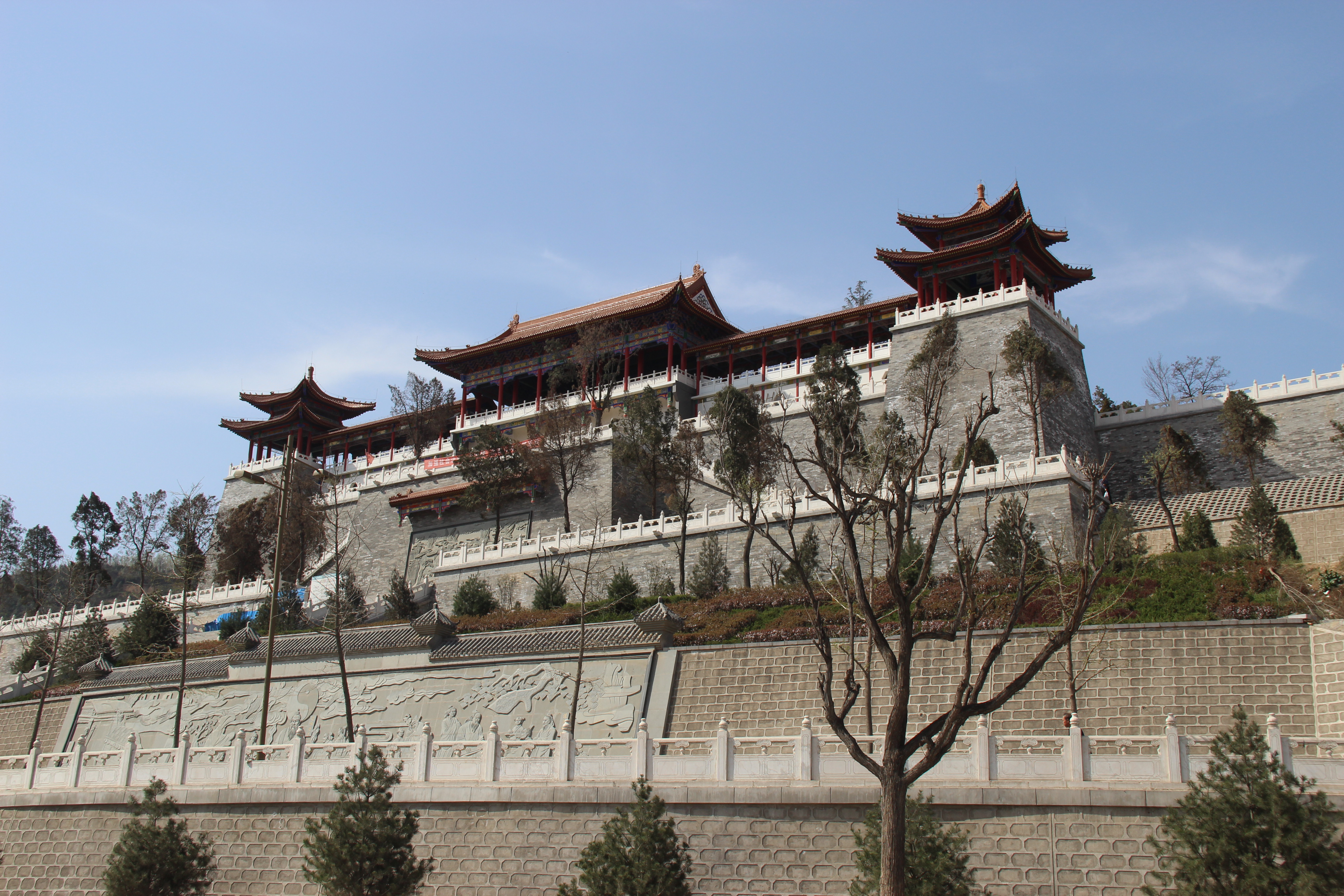
Jintai Taoist Temple, Baoji, Shaanxi, China

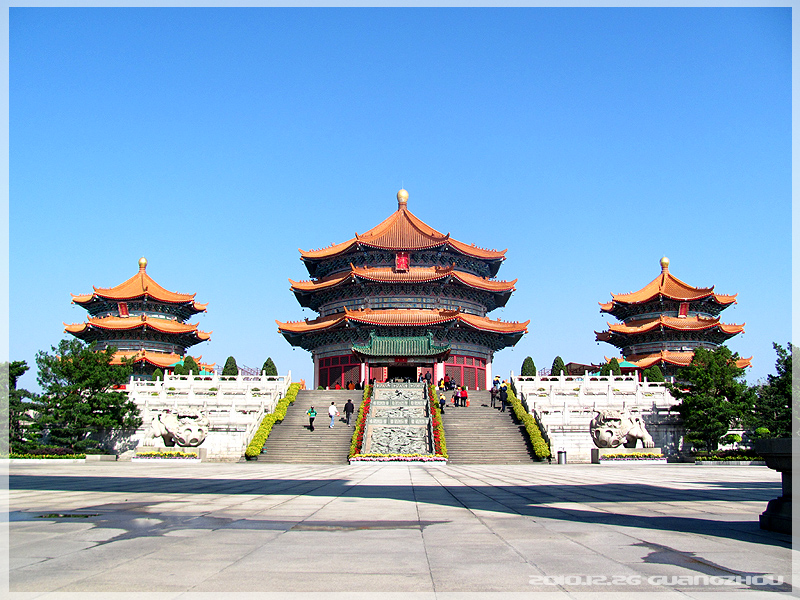
Yuanxuan Taoist Temple, Guangzhou, Guangdong

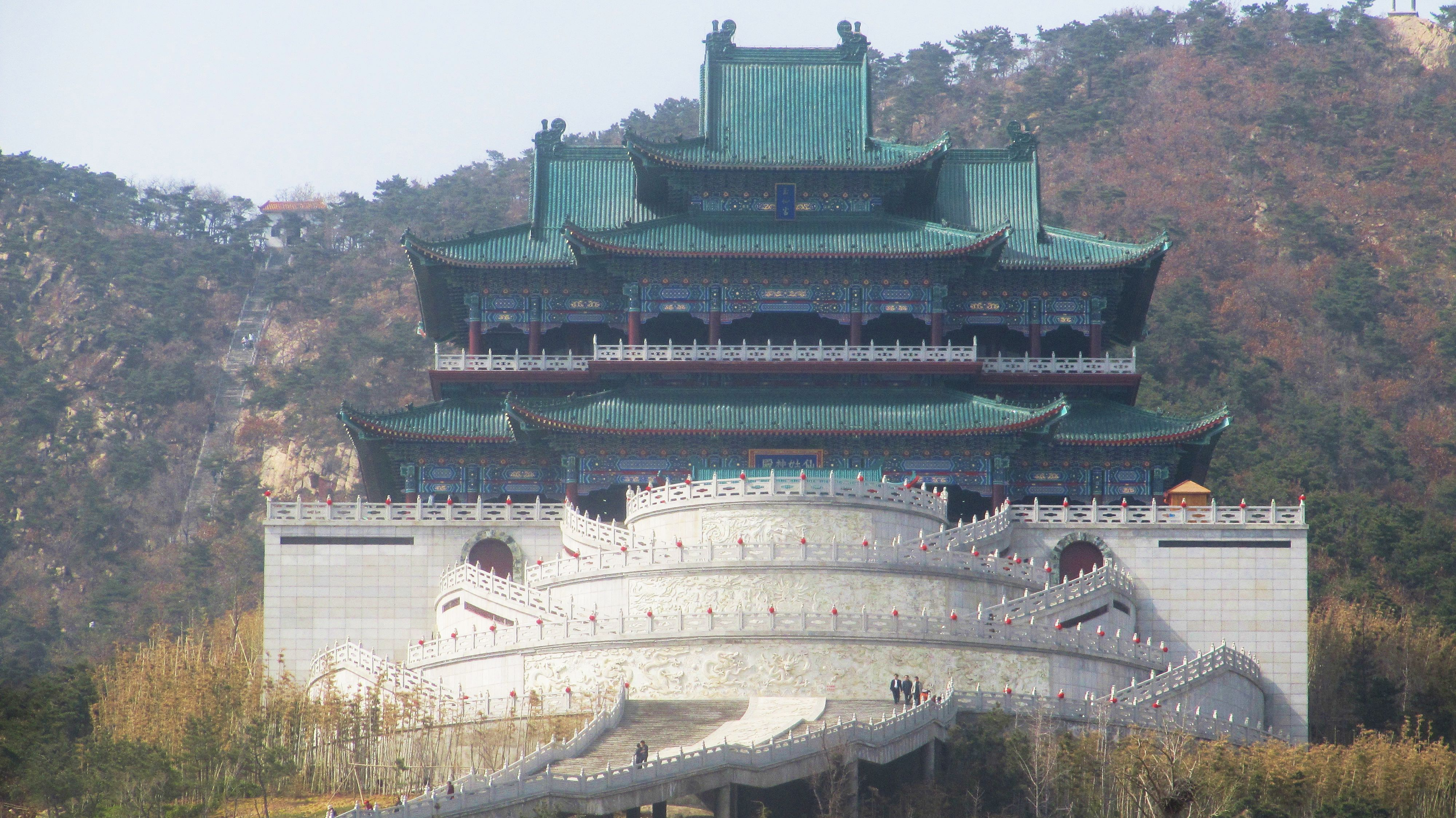
Xianguting Taoist temple in Weihai, Shandong, China

Temple of Five Immortals, Guangzhou, China

Pavilion of Eight Immortals in Penglai, Shandong, China

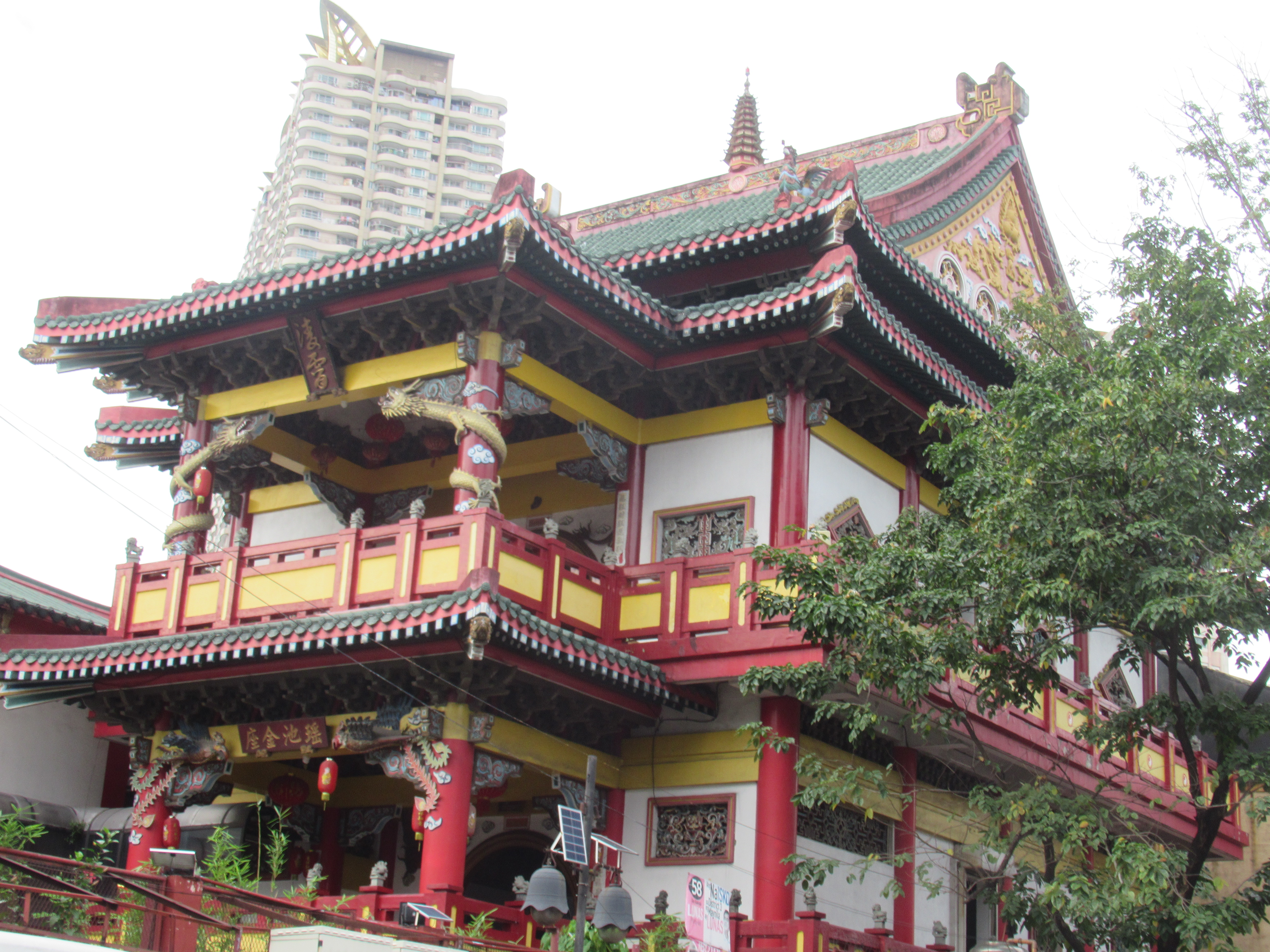
External view of the Kiu Siao Grand Taoist Temple in Manila, Philippines

== See also ==
- Dambana
- Taoism
- Way of the Celestial Masters
- Zhengyi Taoism
- Quanzhen Taoism
- Chinese ritual mastery traditions
- Chinese temple
- Cebu Taoist Temple (Cebu City, Philippines)
