= White Cloud Temple =

Taoist temple and monastery in Beijing, China

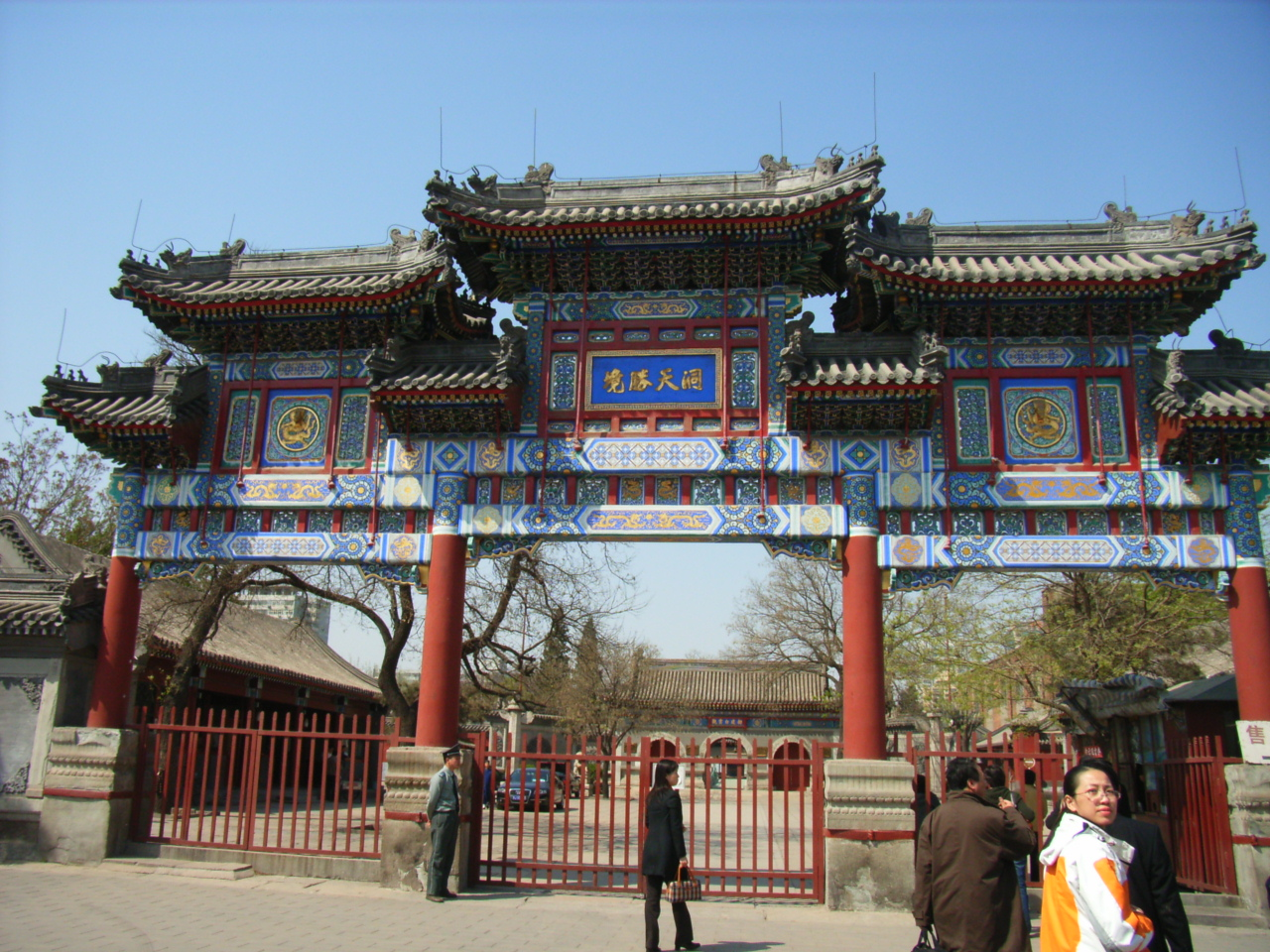
- The archway in front of the entrance to the temple site

Religion
- Affiliation: Taoism

Location
- Location: Beijing, China
- Interactive map of White Cloud Temple
- Coordinates: 39°53′56″N 116°20′17″E

Architecture
- Completed: 14th Century; Ming dynasty

White Cloud Temple
- Traditional Chinese: 白雲觀
- Simplified Chinese: 白云观
- Literal meaning: Temple of the White Cloud(s)
Transcriptions
Standard Mandarin
- Hanyu Pinyin: Báiyún Gùan
- Wade–Giles: Pai-yün Kuan

Tianchang Temple
- Traditional Chinese: 天長觀
- Simplified Chinese: 天长观
- Literal meaning: Temple of Heavenly Perpetuity
Transcriptions
Standard Mandarin
- Hanyu Pinyin: Tiāncháng Guàn
- Wade–Giles: T‘ien-chang Kuan

Changchun Temple
- Traditional Chinese: 長春宮
- Simplified Chinese: 长春宫
- Literal meaning: Palace of Eternal Spring; Palace of Master Changchun
Transcriptions
Standard Mandarin
- Hanyu Pinyin: Chángchūn Gōng
- Wade–Giles: Ch‘ang-ch‘un Kong

The White Cloud Temple, also known as Baiyun Temple or the Abbey or Monastery of the White Clouds, is a Taoist temple and monastery located in Beijing, China. It is one of "The Three Great Ancestral Courts" of the Quanzhen School of Taoism and is titled "The First Temple under Heaven".

== History ==
The White Cloud Temple was first founded in the mid-8th century during the Tang dynasty and was initially called the Temple of Heavenly Perpetuity (Tianchang Guan). During this period, the abbey was state-sponsored and staffed by an elite clergy. From 1125 to 1215 when what is now Beijing was controlled by the Jin dynasty, the abbey served as the Taoist administrative headquarters and played an important role in state ceremonies. After Beijing was taken by the Mongols in 1215, the abbey was taken over by the Quanzhen patriarch Qiu Chuji and became the headquarters of the Quanzhen movement until the establishment of the Ming dynasty. Qiu—who himself was known by the name Master of Eternal Spring—renamed the abbey the Palace of Eternal Spring (Changchun Gong). Upon being summoned by Genghis Khan, Qiu undertook a three-year trek from Shandong to give the great khan an exposition on Taoism, which he completed in October 1222. Qiu's successor, Yin Zhiping (尹志平; 1169–1251) built a memorial shrine over Qiu's grave. This shrine became a temple in its own right and became known as the White Cloud Temple. The abbey was damaged when the Mongols took over in the late 13th century and, during the Ming dynasty, the Palace of Eternal Spring was destroyed. However, the White Cloud Temple survived and took over the functions of its former parent. Under the Ming, clergy from the Zhengyi school took over operations of the abbey but continued Quanzhen traditions and ordination ceremonies. Zhengyi control over the temple continued until the 17th century, when their monopoly ended and the Quanzhen master Wang Changyue (王常月; d. 1680) took over. To this day, the White Cloud Temple remains controlled by the Quanzhen school. The abbey was without an abbot for the 1940s and was closed when the communists came to power in 1949. Unlike many other historical sites which were being destroyed during the Cultural Revolution, the White Cloud Temple managed to survived but was also damaged. Today, it is again a fully functioning temple and is the seat of the Chinese Taoist Association.

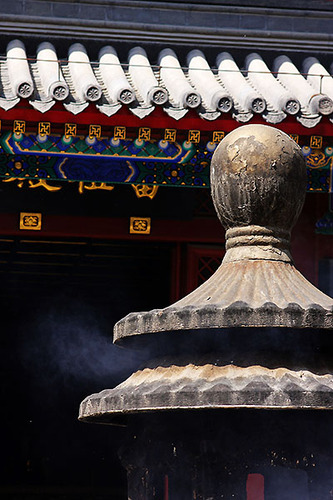
White Cloud Temple

== Layout ==
Like most other Chinese temples, the White Cloud Temple is laid out on a north-south axis, with the entrance at the south end. There are five main halls built upon the main axis, beginning with the Main Gate, Yuhuang Hall (玉皇殿, "Hall of the Jade Emperor"), Laolü Hall (老律堂), Qiuzu Hall (丘祖殿, "Hall of the Venerable Qiu"), and finally the Sanqing Hall (三清殿, "Hall of the Three Pure Ones"). On either side of the main axis are two smaller axes, each containing halls dedicated to a variety of deities. In the rear of the complex is a garden which hosts the abbey's ordination platform.

=== Yuhuang Hall ===
This hall was first built in 1661 and was rebuilt in 1788. It is dedicated to the Jade Emperor, who oversees the Celestial Bureaucracy in Chinese religion. It is three bays long with a gabled roof, and is flanked by drum and bell towers.

=== Laolü Hall ===
This hall has the same design as the Yuhuang Hall and was first built in 1456. The monastic community holds a twice-daily office in the Laolü Hall, and it is where ordination certificates are issued.

=== Qiuzu Hall ===
Originally built to enshrine Qiu Chuji, this hall was first built in 1228. It is three bays long with a front gallery.

=== Sanqing Hall ===
In 1428, the Sanqing hall was built. It is a two-story, five bay structure with a gabled roof that contains statues of the Three Pure Ones on the top floor and the Four Celestial Aides on the bottom floor.

== Ordinations ==
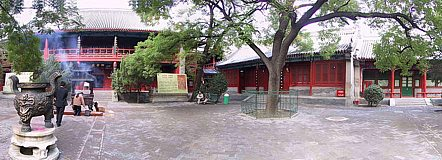
White Cloud Temple

Out of 20 Quanzhen ordination seminaries in the Qing dynasty, the White Cloud Temple was the most important of all. In order to become a Taoist monk of Quanzhen Order, novices first had to spend three years living in a temple. After accomplishing this, they were eligible to be ordained. The ordination was extremely harsh. Each novice had to undergo 100 days of brutal training that sometimes resulted in death. In modern times, this has been reduced to 53 days and is no longer as dangerous. After this training period, novices had exams on Taoist classics, poetry, and precepts. Afterwards, successful novices were fully ordained as Taoist monks. During the Qing dynasty, an average of 200 novices were ordained every four years. Ordination ceremonies ended after 1927, but were resumed in 1989.

== Festivals ==
Every year on the 19th day of the first lunar month a festival is held at the abbey in celebration of Qiu Chuji's birthday. It has been thought that Qiu would return to earth as an immortal on this day. The festival was first held during the Yuan dynasty, but was suspended after the People's Republic of China was established in 1949. The festival was revived in the 1990s and continues to be held to this day.

== Gallery ==
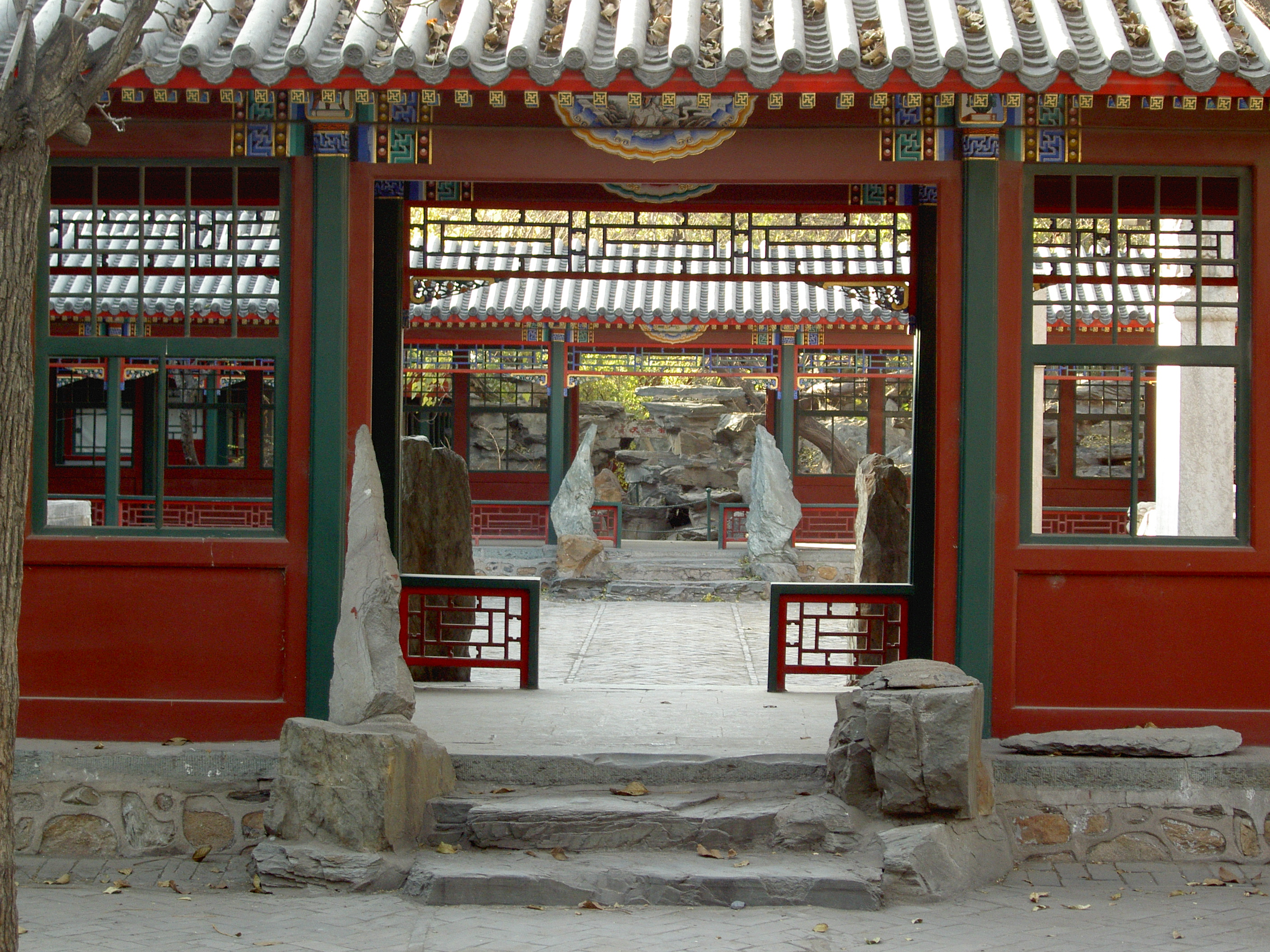

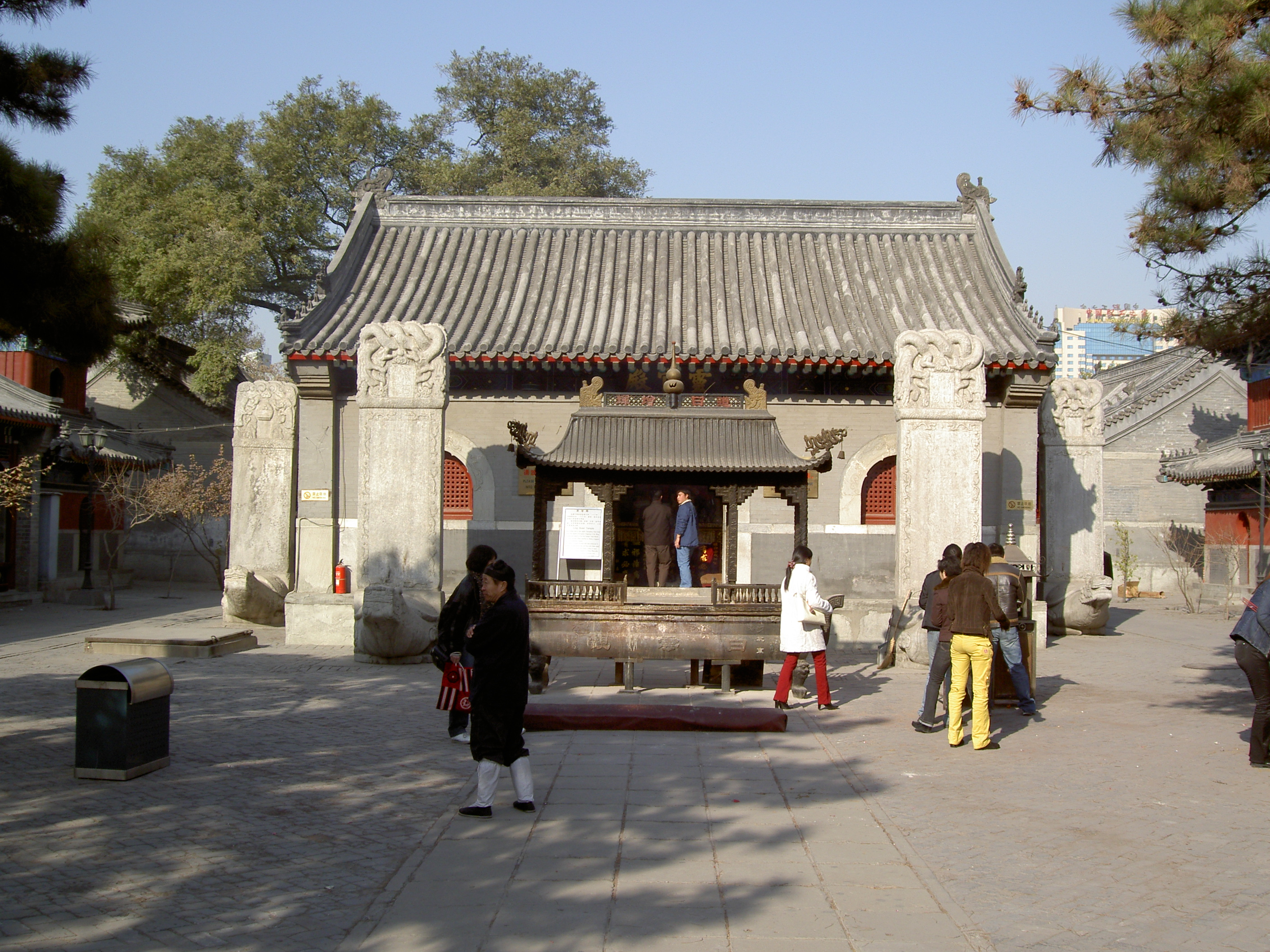

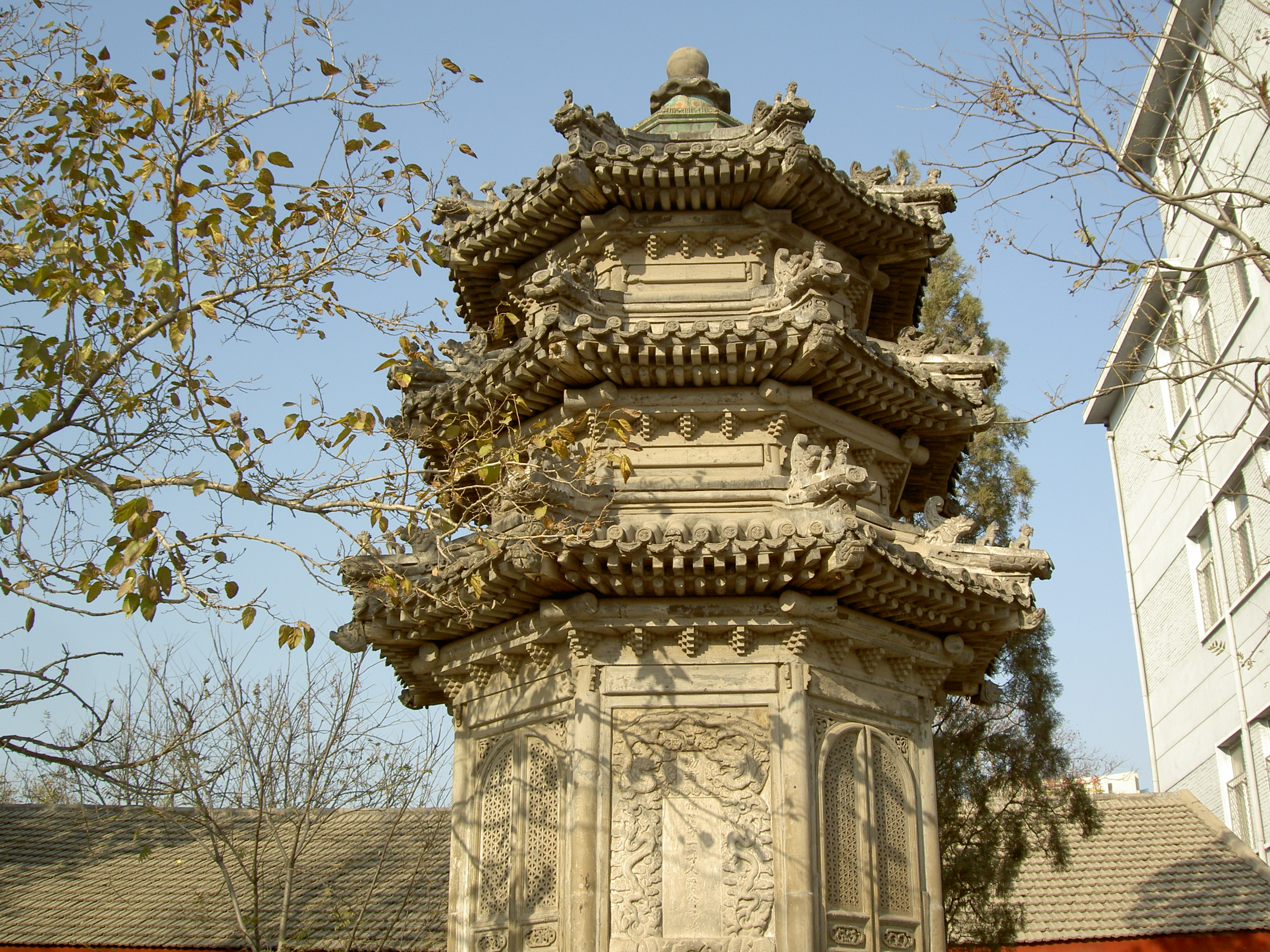

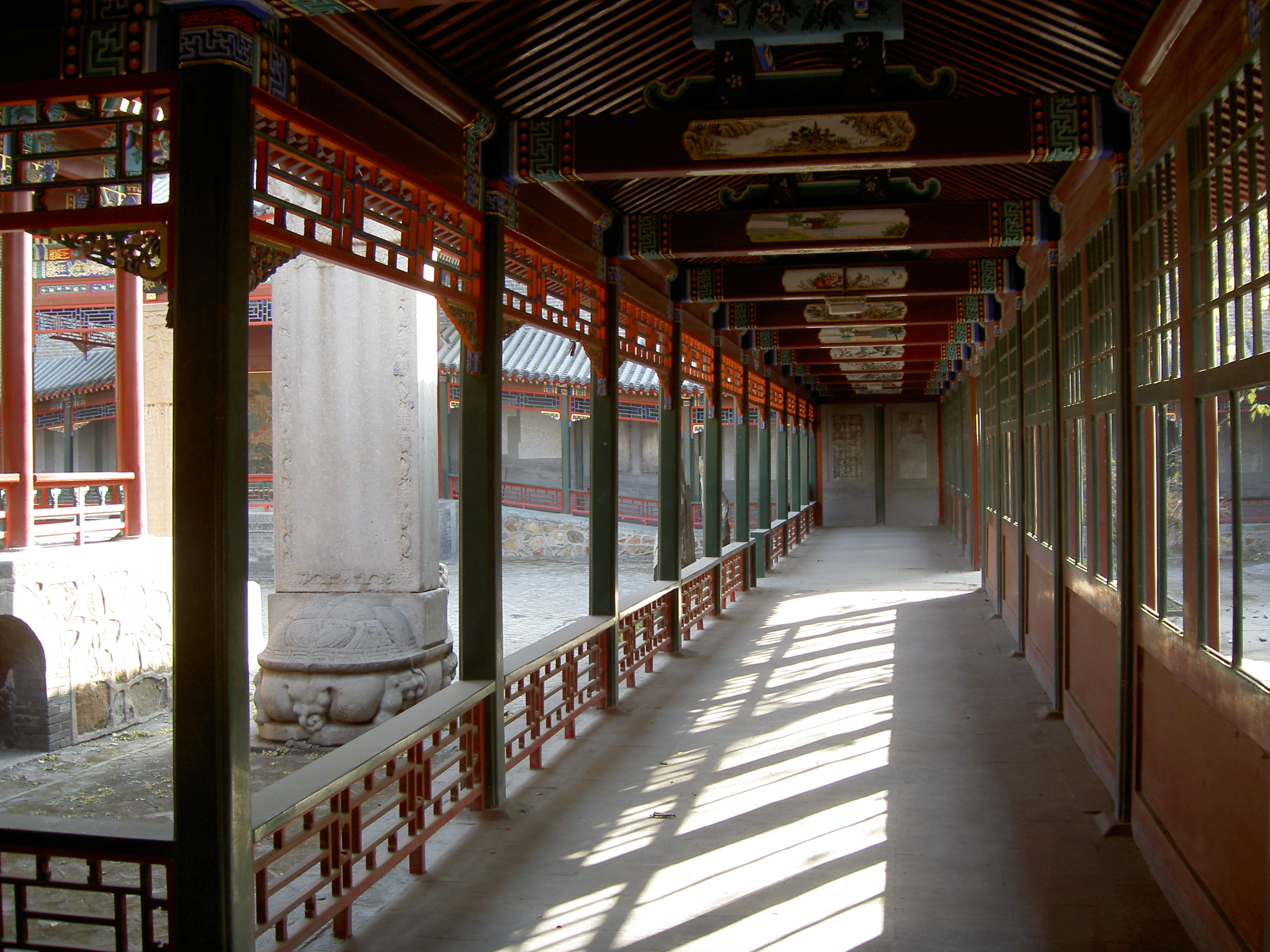

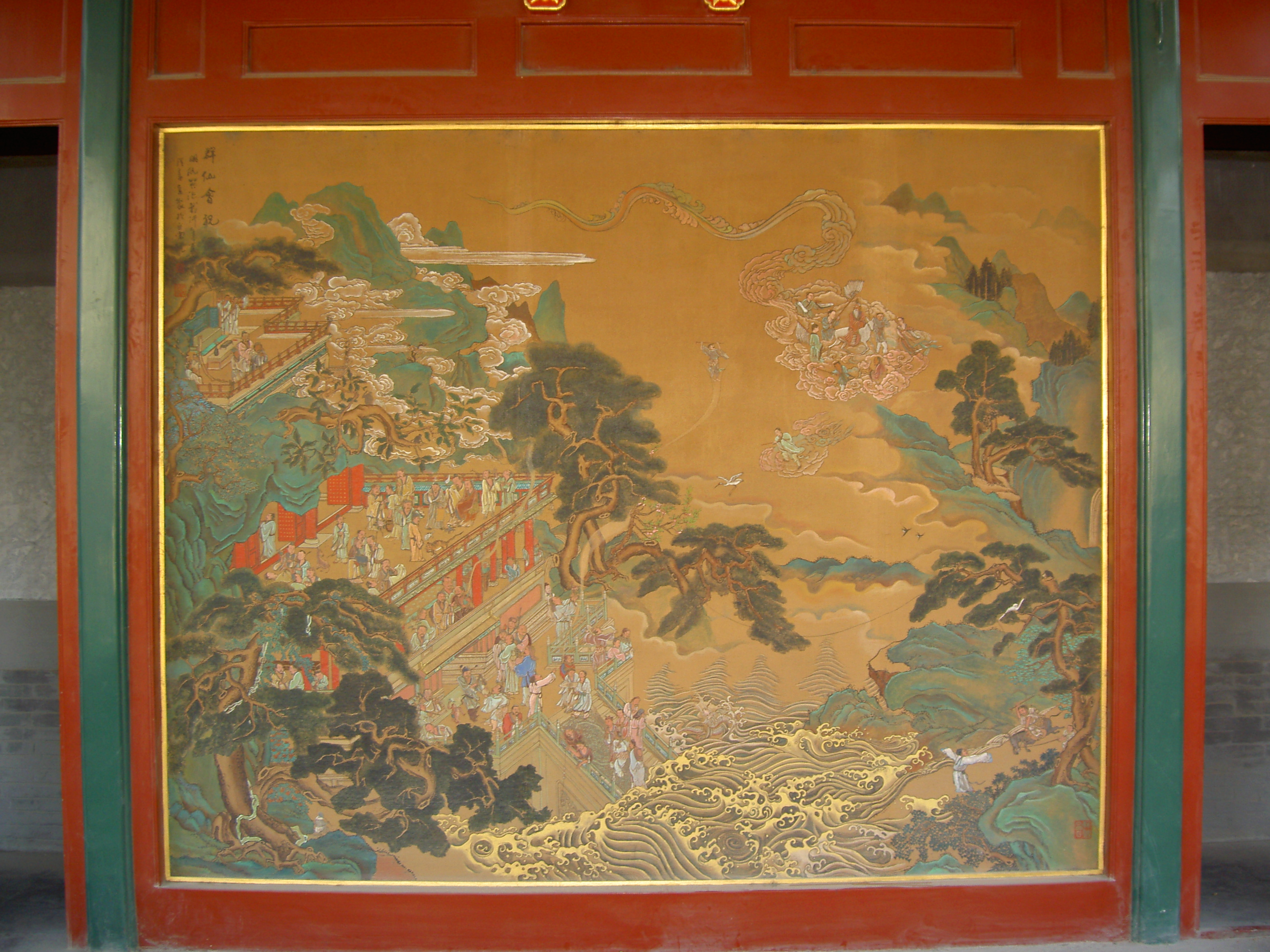

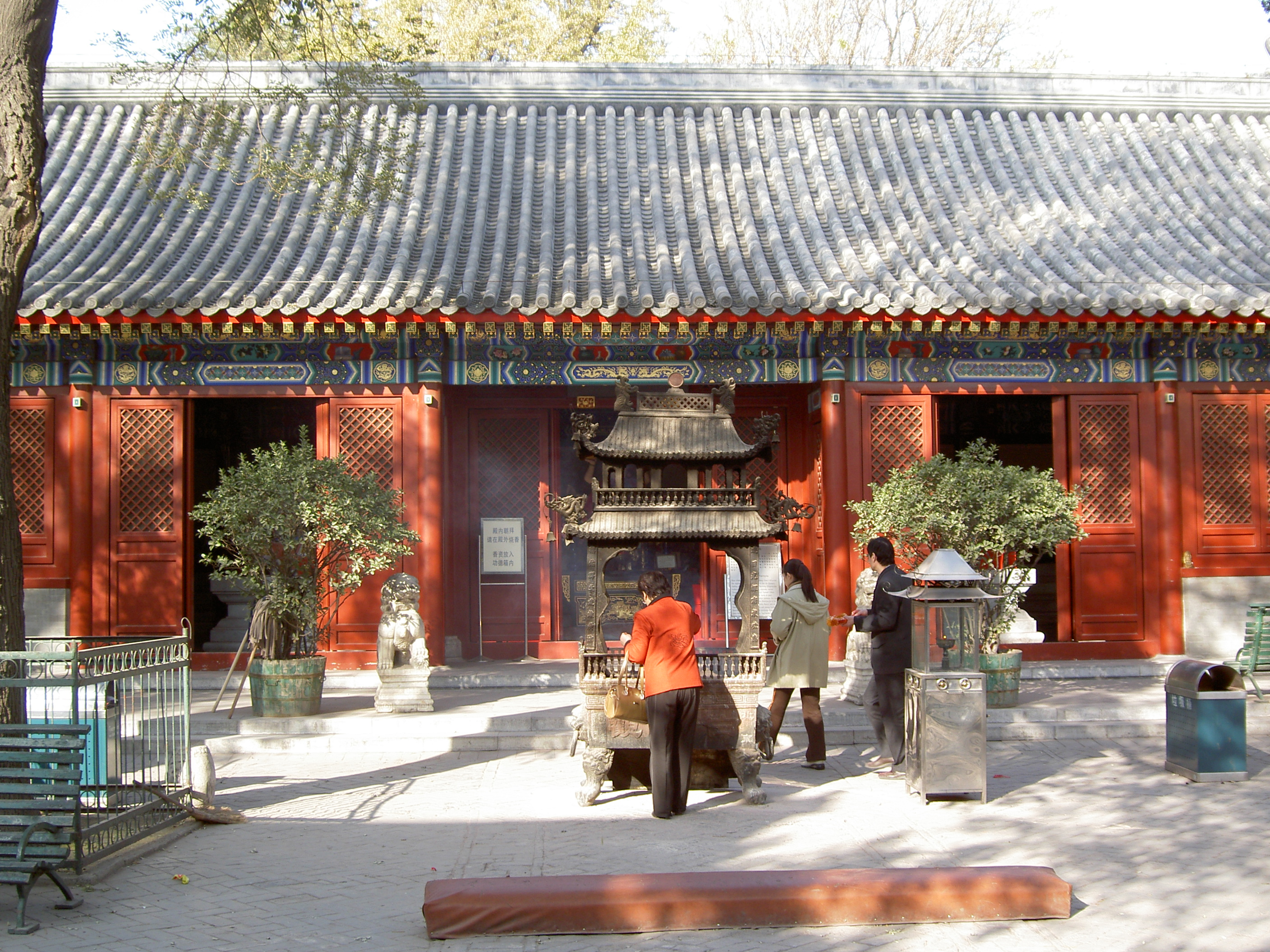

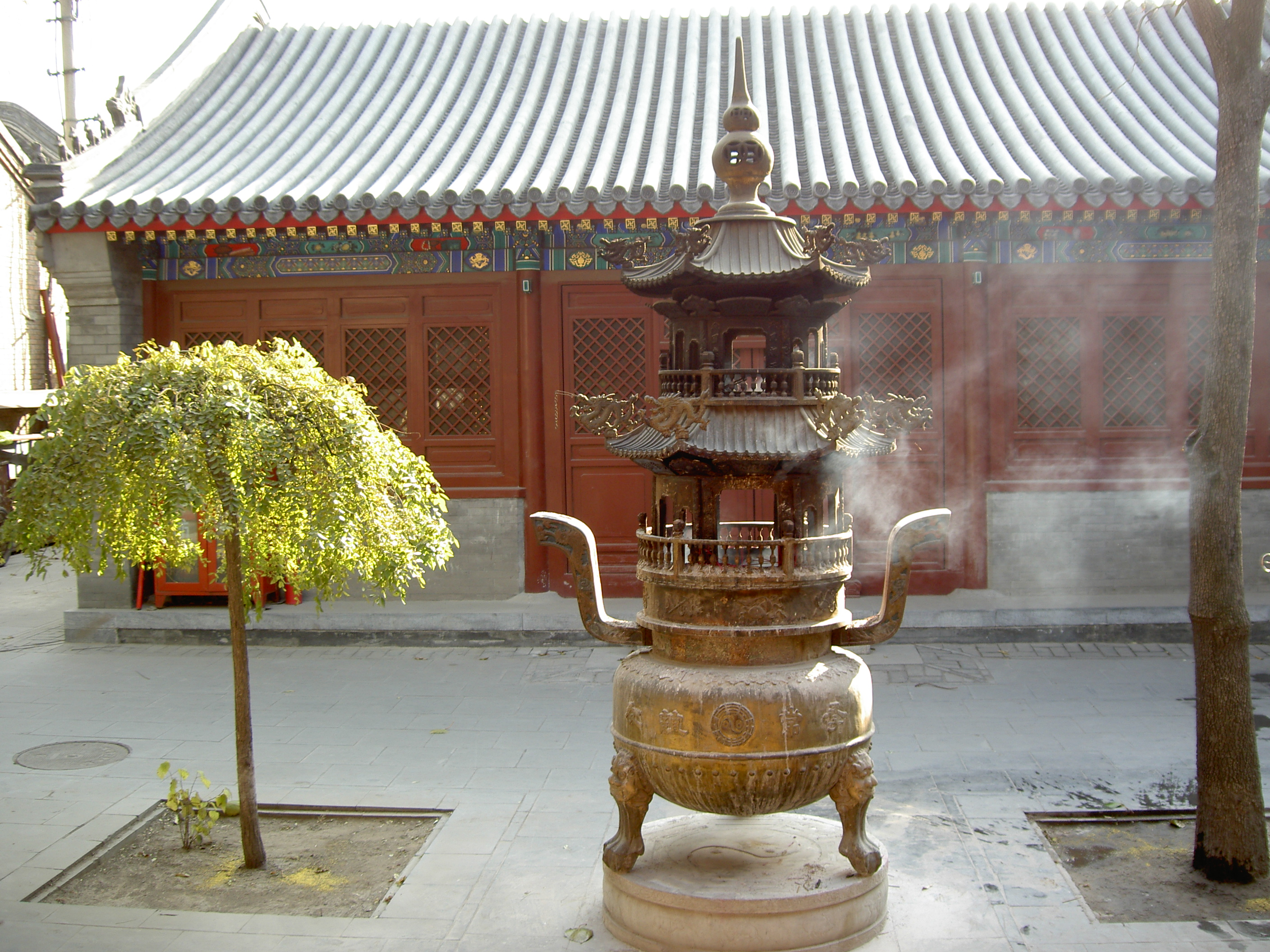

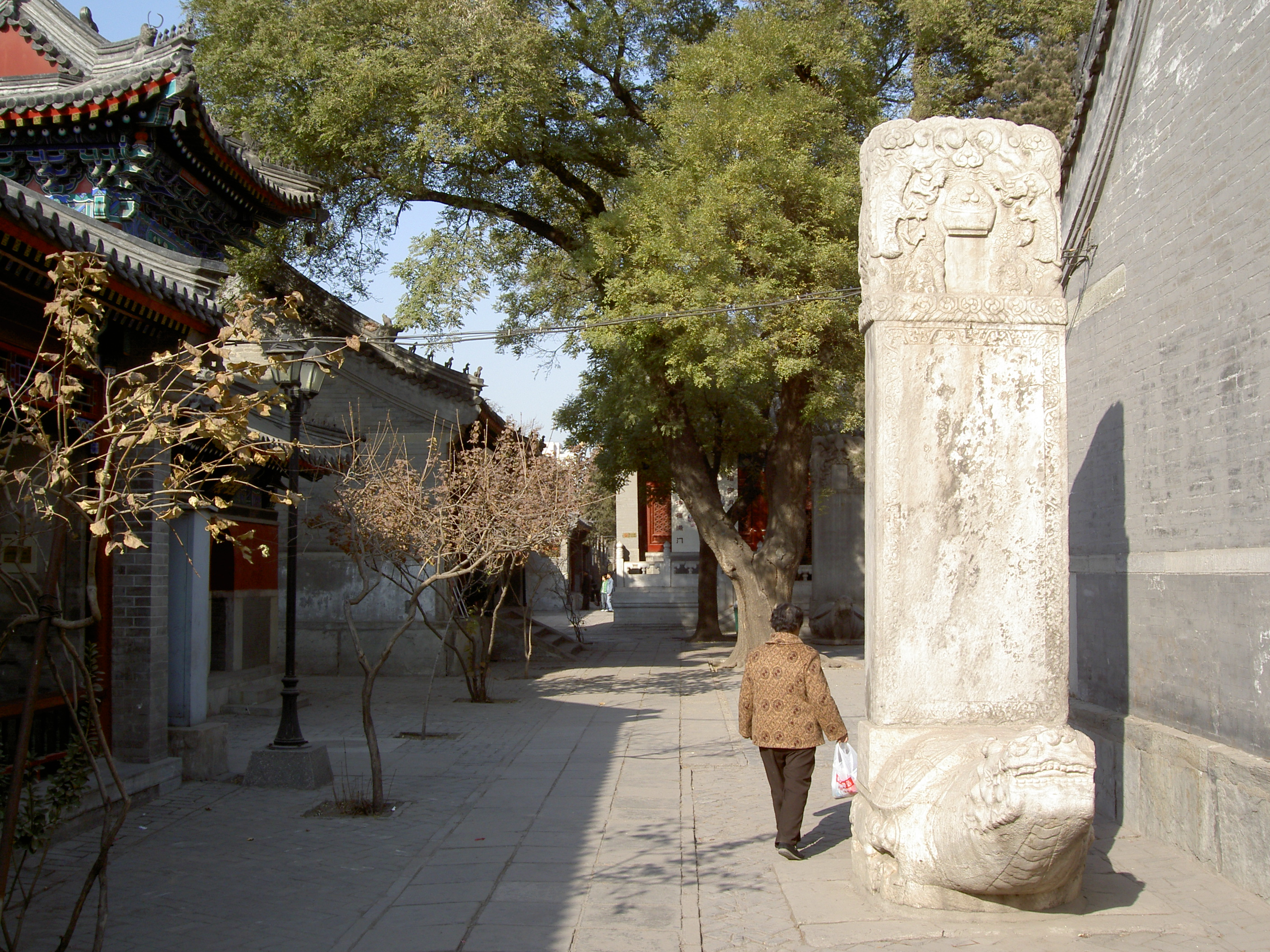

== See also ==
- Taoism & Taoist Canon
- Master Changchun
- Quanzhen School
- Dragon Gate Taoism
- History of Taoism
- Taoist schools
- Chinese Taoist Association
