= Qiu Chuji =

Taoist master (1148–1227)

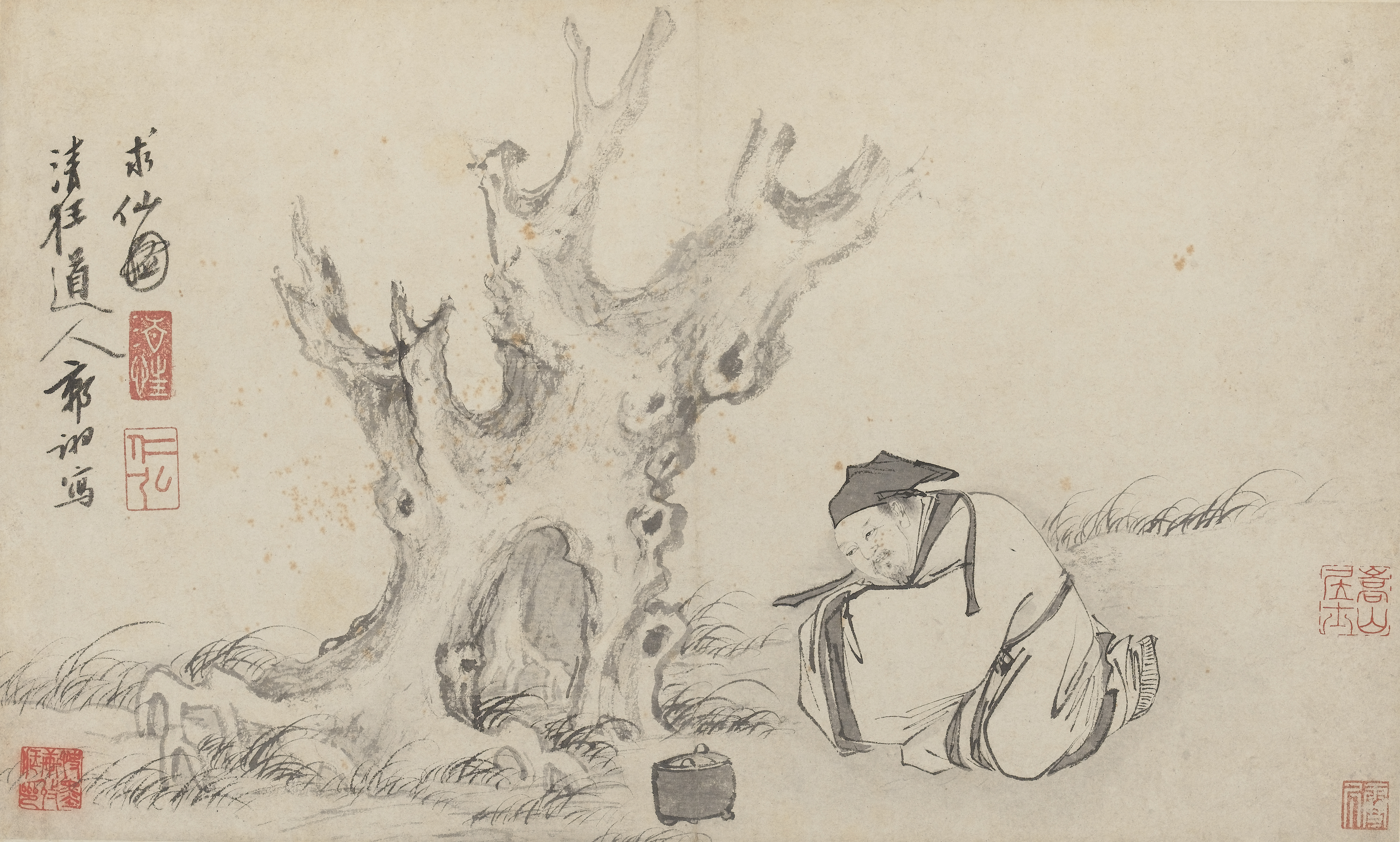
- Qiu Chuji as depicted in by Guo Xu, 1503 (Shanghai Museum)
- Traditional Chinese: 丘處機
- Simplified Chinese: 丘处机
Transcriptions
Standard Mandarin
- Hanyu Pinyin: Qiū Chǔjī
- Wade–Giles: Ch‘iu Ch‘u-chi

Master Changchun
- Traditional Chinese: 長春子
- Simplified Chinese: 长春子
- Literal meaning: Master of the Eternal Spring
Transcriptions
Standard Mandarin
- Hanyu Pinyin: Chángchūnzi
- Wade–Giles: Ch‘ang-ch‘un-tzu

Qiu Chuji (10 February 1148– 22 August 1227), courtesy name Tongmi (通密), also known by his Taoist name Master Changchun, was a renowned Taoist master from late Southern Song/Jin dynasty and a famous disciple of Wang Chongyang, the founder of Quanzhen School. He is known for being invited by Genghis Khan to a personal meeting near the Hindu Kush, who also respected and honored him as an Immortal.

Qiu is one of the Seven Perfected of the North. He is the founder of the Longmen (Dragon Gate) school of Quanzhen Taoism which already at his time became the most widespread school of Taoism, so prominent that it became synonymous with the phrase "the Dragon Gate covers half the realm", and it is still the case nowadays.

== History ==
On the nineteenth day of the first lunar month in 1148 (the eighth year of the Huangtong era of the Jin dynasty), Qiu Chuji was born in Bindu village, Qixia county, Dengzhou Prefecture, Shandong Province. Orphaned of both parents from an early age, he endured the hardships of the human world, being fed and clothed from the charity of many families. From childhood, he yearned to cultivate immortality.

As a youth, he took refuge on Gongshan Mountain north of his village, living a life of “wearing pine blossoms on his head, eating pine nuts, and drinking pine breeze with the moon over the pine stream.”

In 1167 he began studying Daoism. In the following year, hearing that Wang Chongyang was teaching at the Quanzhen Hut in Ninghai Prefecture, Qiu Chuji went there and became his disciple.

Between 1168 and 1170, Qiu Chuji accompanied Wang Chongyang in spreading the teachings across Shandong and Henan. Here societies were established such as the Seven Treasures Society, the Golden Lotus Society, and the Three Lights Society, so as to lay a foundation for the Quanzhen Taoism.

In 1169, Wang Chongyang journeyed westward with four disciples: Ma Danyang, Qiu Chuji, Tan Chuduan and Liu Chuxuan. In the winter of this year, they arrived in Bianliang, Henan, and fixed their residence in an inn run by a porcelain dealer surnamed Wang. On the 4th day of the first lunar month in the next year, Wang Chongyang passed away and ascended to Heaven. In his will he instructed: “Chuji’s studies shall be entrusted to Danyang.” Thereafter, under the tutelage of Ma Danyang, Qiu Chuji's knowledge and Daoist cultivation advanced rapidly.

Immediately after burying their master temporarily in Meng Zongxian's garden, Ma, Tan, Liu and Qiu went to Zhongnan county, Shaanxi, to pay a formal visit to Wang Chongyang's fellow Daoists and earlier disciples. In 1172, they reinterred Chongyang in Liujiang village, Zhongnan county, and then dwelled in huts beside the grave for some years.

At night during the Mid-Autumn festival in 1174, the four disciples respectively spoke out their plans and then parted ways.

Qiu Chuji travelled westward and when arrived at the Pan stream (Panxi), he decided to conduct here his cultivation, dwelling in a cave. Later, noticing that the people were struggling to cross the stream in the high water season, he carried them on his back across the river everyday. So, six years passed in Panxi.

In 1180, Qiu Chuji came to the Longmen (Dragon Gate) Mountain in Longzhou (present-day Baoji). Seeing the beautiful scenery, quiet surroundings, natural caves and springs, and hearing that immortal Lou Jing of the Han dynasty once cultivated himself in this place, Qiu decided to settle here. After selecting a cave as his residence, he went on with his cultivation and refinement for seven years, emerging as the founder of the Quanzhen Longmen school.

During this time, Qiu Chuji's reputation grew. In 1186, Jiagu Qingchen, commander of the Jingzhao forces, invited Qiu to take charge of religious affairs at the Ancestral Hut in Liujiang, Zhongnan county.

In the spring of 1188, Emperor Shizong of the Jin dynasty summoned Qiu Chuji. The latter then stayed in Yanjing (now Beijing) for half a year. During this period he asked several times for leave, but Emperor Shizong never agreed and often called him in to discuss official business in the palace. Qiu Chuji beseeched to retire over and over. Seeing that he was determined to leave, Shizong had to consent and bestowed upon him a huge sum of money, which he declined resolutely.

In the winter of 1191, as Emperor Zhangzong of the Jin dynasty gave orders to prohibit preaching, Qiu Chuji had to lead Zhao Daojian, Song Dao'an and a few other disciples away from Shaanxi back to his hometown Qixia, in Shandong Province. Here the Taixu (Supreme Emptiness) Temple was constructed under the supervision of Qiu Chuji, becoming a base for spreading Taoism.

Qiu Chuji, who often relieved victims with money and food donated by wealthy persons, was held in high esteem among the people in the areas of Yan and Zhao, Qi and Lu. Local officials also acquiesced, seeing that he was really doing good to the people. As a result, Qiu Chuji enjoyed great renown for his merciful aids both in the court and among the commonality.

In 1214, riots took place in Shandong. Learning about his prestige, Pusan Chao'en, the military officer responsible for suppressing rebellions, asked Qiu Chuji to offer amnesty to the rebellious people in the areas of Dengzhou and Laizhou. Because Qiu Chuji enjoyed high public regard, the rebels in various places all showed a willingness to accept amnesty and pledge royalty to the ruler.

Between 1216 and 1219, the Jin and Song courts both invited Qiu Chuji several times to assist the court, but were always turned down. The local officials and gentry felt puzzled about his decision. Thereupon Qiu Chuji explained, "I act in accordance with Heaven's will, so how can you understand it?"

In the winter of 1219, Genghis Khan of Mongolia sent Zhaba'er and Liu Zhonglu, carrying an imperial edict and a tiger golden tablet with them, from the Naiman state in the Western Region for Qiu Chuji. Qiu Chuji accepted the invitation. Knowing that the Mongolian army had been notorious for its ruthless killing. In order to dissuade this army from brutal massacres and running amok, he willingly accepted Genghis Khan's invitation. In the second lunar month in the early spring of the next year, Qiu Chuji took 18 of his disciples along to embark upon their westward journey to stop the killing.

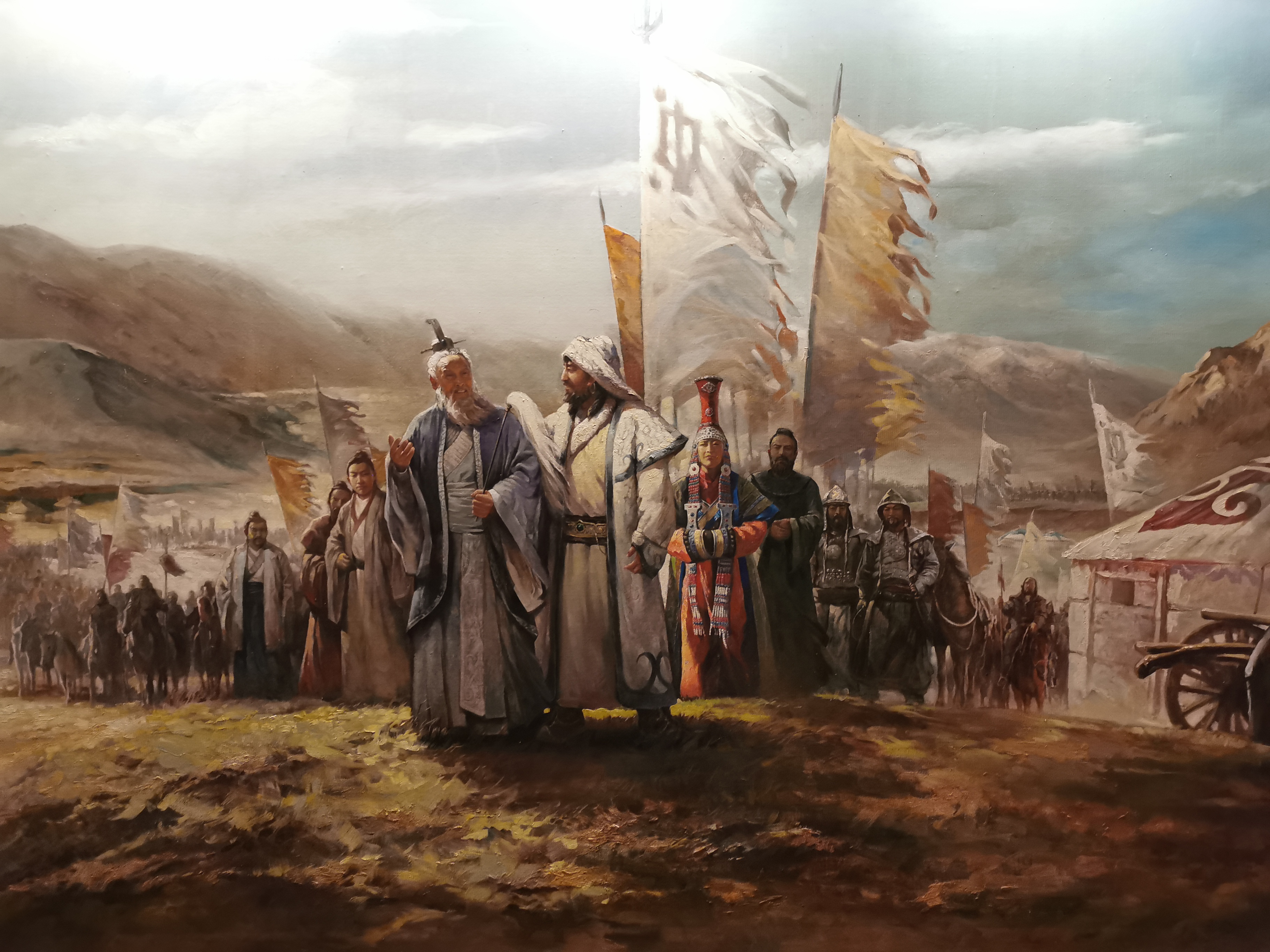
Qiu met with Genghis Khan

Genghis Khan invited Qiu Chuji to visit him in a letter dated 15 May 1219 by present reckoning. Qiu Chuji left his home in Shandong in February 1220 and journeyed to Yanjing. Learning that Genghis had gone West, he spent winter there. In February 1221, Ancestor Qiu left, traversing modern-day eastern Mongolia to the camp of Genghis' youngest brother Otchigin near Lake Buyur in the upper Kerulen – today's Kherlen-Amur basin. From there he traveled southwestward up the Kerulen, crossing the Karakorum region in north-central Mongolia, and arrived at the Altai Mountains, probably passing near the present Uliastai. After traversing the Altai he visited Bishbalig, modern Ürümqi, and moved along the north side of the Tian Shan range to Lake Sutkol, today's Sairam, Almaliq (or Yining City), and the rich valley of the Ili.

From there, Qiu Chuji passed to Balasagun and Shu River, and across that river to Talas and the Tashkent region, and then over the Syr Darya to Samarkand, where he halted for some months. Finally, through the Iron Gates of Termit, over the Amu Darya, and by way of Balkh and northern Afghanistan, Qiu Chuji reached Genghis' camp near the Hindu Kush in 1222.

Genghis Khan rose to greet Qiu Chuji, while the latter folded his hands and made a respectful bow in return, without prostrating as would have been the custom. Genghis Khan called Qiu Chuji "Immortal", and asked whether there existed means for never dying. Qiu answered, "There are only ways of nourishing life, but no elixir for obtaining immortality." Genghis Khan expressed appreciation for his frankness.

In a period of less than a year, Genghis Khan had three meetings with Qiu Chuji where he inquired about Taoism, in particular asking about methods of governance and health preservation. Qiu Chuji pointed out that Heaven treasures life and disapproves of killing, and explained the principles that honoring Heaven and loving people were the foundation of governing people, and that having a pure heart and few worldly desires was the essential of nourishing life. Genghis Khan showed great consent. He ordered Yelu Chucai to compile their talks into the Records of the Auspicious Gathering with the Mysterious Wind and educated his descendants with it.

In the spring of 1223, Qiu Chuji took leave of Genghis Khan. The khan issued an edict exempting the Quanzhen school from all taxes and corvée labour.

Returning home, Qiu Chuji largely followed his outward route, with certain deviations, such as a visit to Hohhot. He was back in Yanjing by the end of January 1224. From the narrative of his expedition, Travels to the West of Qiu Chang Chun written by his pupil Li Zhichang, we derive some of the most vivid pictures ever drawn of nature and man between the Great Wall of China and Kabul, between the Aral and Yellow Seas, peppered by poetic expressions.

Of particular interest are the sketches of the Mongols and the people of Samarkand and its vicinity, the account of the land and products of Samarkand in the Ili Valley at or near Almalig-Kulja, and the description of various great mountain ranges, peaks and defiles, such as the Chinese Altay, the Tian Shan, Bogdo Uula, and the Iron Gates of Termit. There is, moreover, a noteworthy reference to a land apparently identical with the uppermost valley of the Yenisei.

In the spring of 1224, Qiu Chuji accepted the invitation from officials in Yanjing to preside over the Tianchang Monastery. In 1227, an imperial edict was issued renaming the Tianchang Monastery as the Changchun Palace (present-day White Cloud Temple in Beijing). The palace was bestowed with the tiger golden tablet, and it was decreed that “all matters concerning the religion shall be handled by the Immortal”—effectively appointing Qiu Chuji to oversee all religions throughout the realm.

On the ninth day of the seventh lunar month in 1227 (22 August 1227 of the Gregorian calendar), Qiu Chuji passed away at the Baoxuan Hall within Changchun Palace at the age of eighty. For three days, the city of Yanjing was enveloped in a dense, auspicious fragrance—a phenomenon regarded as miraculous by the populace.

On the first anniversary of his death, his disciples interred him at the Chushun Hall within Changchun Palace.

During the reign of Emperor Shizu of Yuan, he was posthumously honoured as the “Perfected Patriarch Changchun, Preacher of the Dao.”

To commemorate the immeasurable merits of Immortal Qiu, the common people established the nineteenth day of the first lunar month as the Yanjiu Festival, celebrating it annually to this day. It has since become one of the renowned customs in the Beijing-Tianjin region.

In his seventies, braving sand storm and severe cold, hardships and dangers, Qiu Chuji had traveled long distances to meet Genghis Khan and stop the slaughter. Moved by his deeds, Emperor Qianlong of the Qing dynasty wrote an antithetical couplet: "He achieved eternal immortality without the need of consuming rosy clouds to seek the secret formula; one word stops the killing, now we know aid the world has wondrous merit."

== Fiction ==
Qiu Chuji appears as a character in Jin Yong's Legend of the Condor Heroes, Return of the Condor Heroes, and the 2013 film An End to Killing. In Jin Yong's work he is very different from the real persona, described as a 'bullheaded priest' who gets into fights and contests with rivals—a fictitious character very different from the real Qiu Chuji. His deeds shape much of the future of the 2 main male characters of the first story.

Qiu Chuji appears as a main character in Guo Yulong's 2018 film about Zhang Sanfeng, Zhang Sanfeng: Peerless Hero.

Estonian writer Arvo Valton wrote the novel Journey to the Other Side of Infinity (Tee lõpmatuse teise otsa, 1978) about Qiu Chuji's journey to meet Genghis Khan and their subsequent encounters.

Preceded by Liu Chuxuan	Head Taoist of Quanzhen; 1203–1227	Succeeded by Zhao Daojian
