= Sun Bu'er =

Founder of Qingjing lineage in Quanzhen Taoism

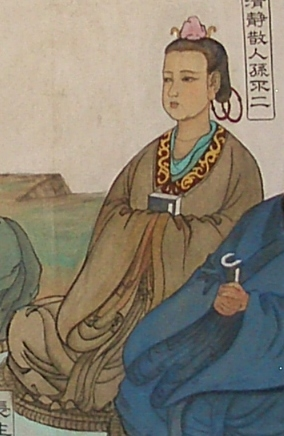

Sun Bu'er (Sun Pu-erh, Chinese: 孫不二), one of the Taoist Seven Masters of Quanzhen, lived c. 1119–1182 C.E. in the Shandong province of China. She was a wealthy woman and was married with three children. Her family name was Sun and her first name was Fuchun (富春), Bu'er being her name in religion. Her husband Ma Yu was a close disciple of Wang Chongyang. At the age of 51, she took up the study of the Tao and herself became a disciple of Wang Chongyang, serving as a Taoist priestess. She eventually left her home and traveled to the city of Luoyang where after twelve years of practice, at Fengxiangu cave, she attained the Tao and, it is said, became an immortal. Sun was a teacher with several disciples, and founded the Purity and Tranquility School (Qingjing Lineage), and wrote many poems.

== Early life ==
Sun Bu'er was born (as Sun Fuchun) in 1119, in a small town located within the Ninghai district of Shandong. Her birth was thought to be the result of a dream her mother had near the time of conception. In the dream, her mother saw seven cranes near her courtyard; six of them flew away, and the seventh magically entered her mother's body through her breast. The crane is a symbol of immortality and is seen as the bird of longevity. After this dream, her mother intuitively knew that she would give birth to a divine being.

At a young age, Sun Bu'er was already exhibiting saintly characteristics. She was very intelligent, lived out the Tao through chants, poems, and practicing calligraphy, and she was devoted to the rites and rules of propriety. Sun Bu'er received literary education from her father (Sun Zhongjing), who was a literary scholar. In her teens, she married Ma Yu (Ma Danyang), and the couple had three sons together. Their lives would remain quiet until 1167, when Wang Chongyang's arrival changed their lives.

== The School of Complete Perfection ==
Wang Chongyang (1112–1170) began his career as a religious leader soon after hermetizing himself in a 100-day retreat. He started a new movement named "Complete Perfection" (Quanzhen). Sun Bu'er's husband, Ma Yu, became an eager follower of Wang. This relationship caused disruption in Sun Bu'er's family life.

Sun became so angry with Wang's interference in her social role that she hoped he would starve to death during his retreat. However, he was still alive after 100 days, during which he had perfected his sainthood. This caused Sun Bu'er to recognize her religious calling.

In order for her husband to pursue his divine path, she had to let him be free. She then decided to leave her family, which contradicted what was seen as her wifely duty. She then began her role in becoming one of the few women in the "Seven Perfected" (the Seven Masters of Quanzhen). This became a major statement in the conflict women undergo between their social role and their religious calling.

== Life as a "Seven Perfected" ==
Sun Bu'er finally joined the "Seven Perfected" after being urged ten times by Wang to convert. Once formally part of the group, Sun Bu'er received her Taoist name, Bu'er. She became a Taoist nun of Complete Perfection Order and a resident of the Golden Lotus Hall, where she received the title, "Serene one of clarity and Tranquility". Sun Bu'er was then able to engage in advanced rituals. Some of these rituals consisted of conducting exorcism and acquiring spiritual powers.

Sun then moved west, where she fought rain, frost and bad terrain. She began following the Zhouyi cantong qi (Tally to the book of changes), which gave her instruction to practice her reversed breathing. She unblocked the orifices in her body, and refined the Qi (energy flow) in her three dantian (located between the eyebrows in the head, the heart and abdomen). She eventually attained full realization of the Tao.

Sun Bu'er then moved to Luoyang and attracted disciples. She set herself up in a residence called Feng xiangu dong (Grotto of the Immortal Lady Feng). She founded a female lineage there and became known for her eccentricity and for her ability to perform exorcisms.

Sun Bu'er did not appear among the Seven Perfected until sixty years after her death. She then received the formal title "Perfected of Clarity and Tranquility and Deep Perfection Who Follows Virtue".

== Renunciation of physical attractiveness ==
Sun Bu'er is most known for her journey from Shandong to Luoyang, where she intentionally made herself ugly by splashing boiling oil on her face to destroy her beauty. She did this in order to survive her trip unmolested. Sun Bu'er knew her physical attractiveness made her a target for men and could hinder her chances of completing her journey. A goal of Sun Bu'er's journey was to overcome her physical attractiveness, that inhibited her Taoist cultivation. By completing this action, she then became recognized for her dedication to the Tao.

== Role for Taoist women ==
Sun Bu'er serves as a model and matriarch for women who follow the tradition of Complete Perfection. She was the only woman to become one of the Complete Perfected. Women who ordained into Complete Perfection Order follow her spiritual path for women. Her determination to lead the life of a female ascetic, devoted to the Tao, have inspired countless other women.

== Accomplishments ==
Sun Bu'er wrote a set of fourteen poems and is credited with various alchemical works. She used her poems and verses to give women a general outline of the alchemical enterprise for women. The poems describe the cosmic connection of an individual's qi (energy flow) and the tendency of humans to fall into sensory complications. The poems outline the path to wholeness and how to achieve the "Tao" through meditation, breathing exercises, the reversion of qi, and ending menstruation.

Sun Bu'er's poems reflect certain aspects of Taoist spirituality: that the cyclical changes in the human body and cycles of the seasons of the natural world are related. Sun Bu'er wrote about letting nature taking its natural course.

This is an example of one of Sun Bu'er's poems used for her teachings:

Projecting the Spirit

There is a body outside the body,
Which has nothing to do with anything produced by magical arts
Making this aware energy completely pervasive Is the living, active, unified, original spirit
The bright moon congeals the gold liquid
Blue lotus refines jade reality
When you've cooked the marrow of the sun and moon
The pearl is so bright you don't worry about poverty (Cahill, 1996, p.62).

== Later life ==
Sun Bu'er died in 1182, having predicted the hour of her departure. Before she died, she groomed herself, put on clean clothes, presented herself to her disciples, and recited a poem; therefore she was able to control her body and life. Sun Bu'er realized her original destiny by returning to the realm of immortals, reaffirming her role as a part of the eternal Dao.

The surviving writings of Sun Bu'er consist of:

- "Secret Book on the Inner Elixir as Transmitted by the Immortal Sun Bu'er" (Sun Bu'er yuanjun chuanshu dandoao mishu)
- "Model Sayings of the Primordial Immortal Sun Bu'er" (Sun Bu'er yuanjun fayu)

== In popular culture ==
=== In Television and Film ===
Sun Bu’er has appeared in various television and film adaptations of Jin Yong’s novels, though her roles are typically smaller than those of more prominent characters.

==== Television Series that depict Sun Bu'er ====
The Legend of the Condor Heroes
Series Name	Actress Name
The Legend of the Condor Heroes (1983)	Lee Heung-kam
The Condor Heroes Return (1994)	Gigi Wong
The Legend of the Condor Heroes (2003)	Wang Lin
The Legend of the Condor Heroes (2008)	Liang Guanhua
The Legend of the Condor Heroes (2017)	Ma Xiaohui
The Return of the Condor Heroes
The Return of the Condor Heroes (1983)	Lee Heung-kam
The Condor Heroes 95 (1995)	Gigi Wong
The Return of the Condor Heroes (2006)	Jiao Enjun

Most portrayals emphasize her wisdom and pioneering role as the only female member of the Seven Zis, often depicting her as a maternal figure who provides guidance and balance within the group while maintaining her own spiritual authority and martial prowess.

=== In Music ===
- Rosalía's 2025 album Lux references Sun Bu'er in the song Novia Robot.
  - The song focuses on the incident where Sun Bu'er ruined her beauty intentionally by pouring scalding oil on her face to avoid harassment from men on her journey from Shandong to Luoyang which she took on alone.
  - This reference is amplified by the satirical opening text of the song, describing a company called "Roboticas con K", serving as a commentary on the rapid commodification and sexualization of the female body.
