= Dragon Gate Taoism =

Chinese sect incorporating Buddhism and Cofucianism

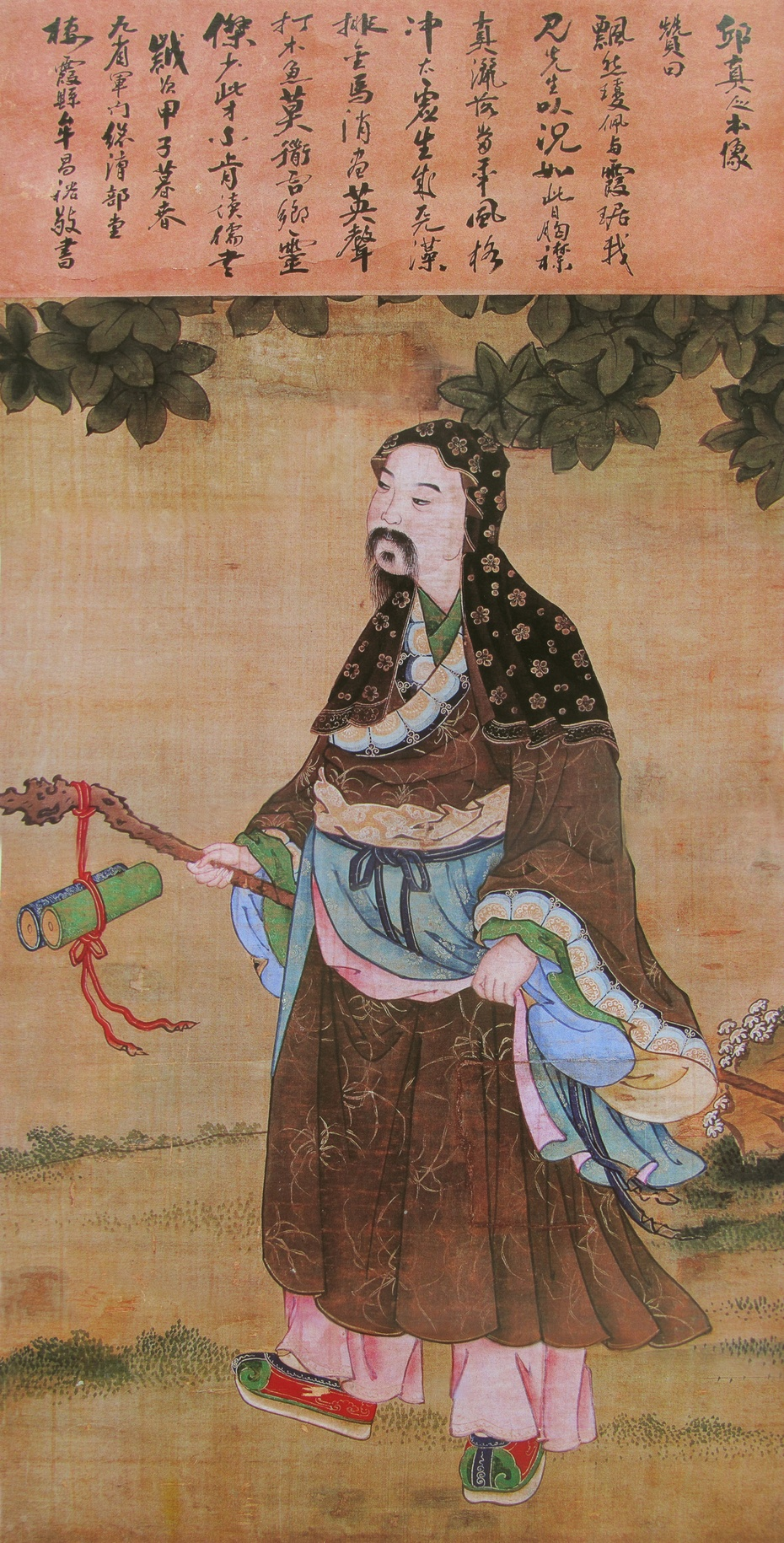
Qiu Chuji casually walking, a painting from the Yuan Dynasty, with an inscription by Mou Changyu from the Qing Dynasty, in White Cloud Temple, Beijing.

The Dragon Gate sect (龍門派 Lóngmén pài) of the Complete Reality School (全真派 Quánzhēn pài) of Taoism incorporates elements of Buddhism and Confucianism into a comprehensive form of Taoism.

Complete Reality Taoism is generally divided into two main traditions, Southern and Northern. The Dragon Gate sect is an offshoot of the Northern school. Its spiritual descent is traced to the thirteenth-century master Qiu Chang-chun (also known as Qiu Chuji), who was one of the original seven disciples of Wang Chongyang. Chang-chun means "Eternal Spring". Genghis Khan appointed Chang-chun overseer of all religions in China, and the Dragon Gate sect thus played a critical role in the conservation of the Han Chinese culture.

== Dragon Gate priests ==
The 7th generation Dragon Gate priest and abbot of White Cloud Monastery in Beijing, Wang Changyue (王常月), could be considered the renaisseur of Dragon Gate Taoism. He authored the Dragon Gate's Core Teachings (龙门心法), the Altar Scripture of the Jasper Garden (碧园坛经), the Precepts and Statutes of the Initial Truth (初真戒律) and the no longer extant Alm's-Bowl Mirror (钵鉴). The 11th generation Dragon Gate priests Min Yi-De (闵一得) combined three faiths (Taoism, Confucianism and Buddhism) together to develop the "Dragon convenience methods". The principle is "learn from Buddhism, to comply with the precepts, diligently practice inner alchemy arts", so that the Dragon Gate branch became thriving. Dragon Gate is currently the largest existing Taoism branch in the world.

After the decline of the Qing Dynasty and the establishment of People's Republic of China, which included the devastating destruction of religions during the Cultural Revolution, people's understanding of Taoism became more limited to the type of Taoism practiced in the temples located in major urban centers.

== Prominent Dragon Gate Temples ==
- White Cloud Temple, Beijing
- Ching Chung Koon, Hong Kong
- Fung Ying Seen Koon, Hong Kong
