= Mount Kunyu =

Mountain range in Shandong, China

Coordinates: 37.2554°N 121.7696°E

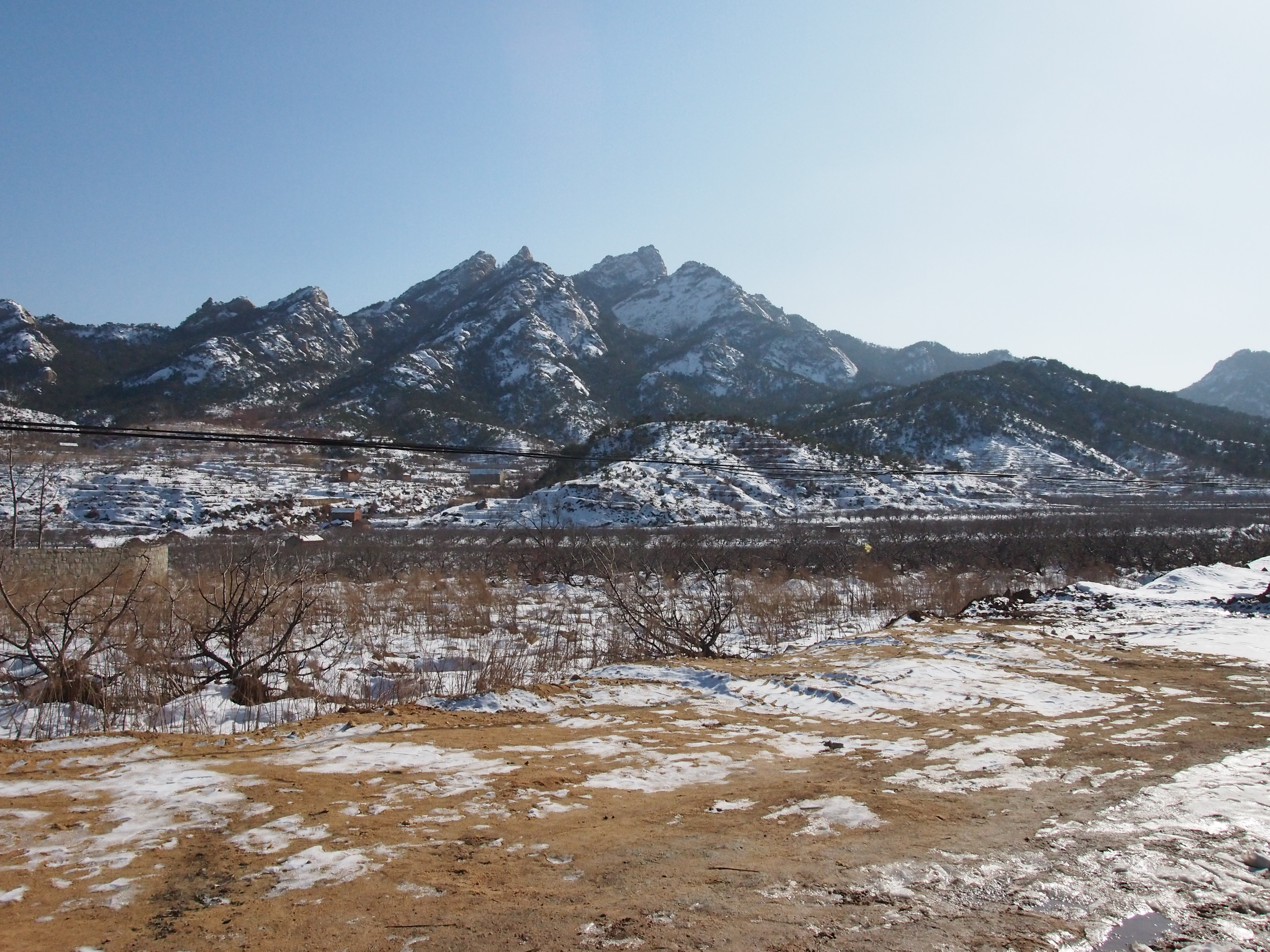
Kunyu Mountain

Mount Kunyu (Chinese: 崑嵛山) is a group of scenic mountains in Shandong Peninsula, Shandong, China. It is located between the cities of Yantai 50 kilometers to the west and Weihai to the east. The highest point is Taibo Peak, at a height of 923 meters above sea level, with a total area of 1750 square kilometers. It is a regional tourist destination complete with hiking trails, picnic areas, and souvenir shops. The mountains are home to a variety of trees, including cherry, apple and apricot, as well as streams and waterfalls.

The Quanzhen School of Taoism was founded here in the 12th century, after which time it continued to hold historical and religious significance, particularly for Taoist monks and Chinese emperors who believed the site held mystical powers granting immortal life.

The area is also home to the Kunyu Mountain Shaolin Martial Arts Academy which sits at the base of the mountains. The school teaches the practice of Shaolin kung fu.
