= Quanzhen School =

Major school of Taoism

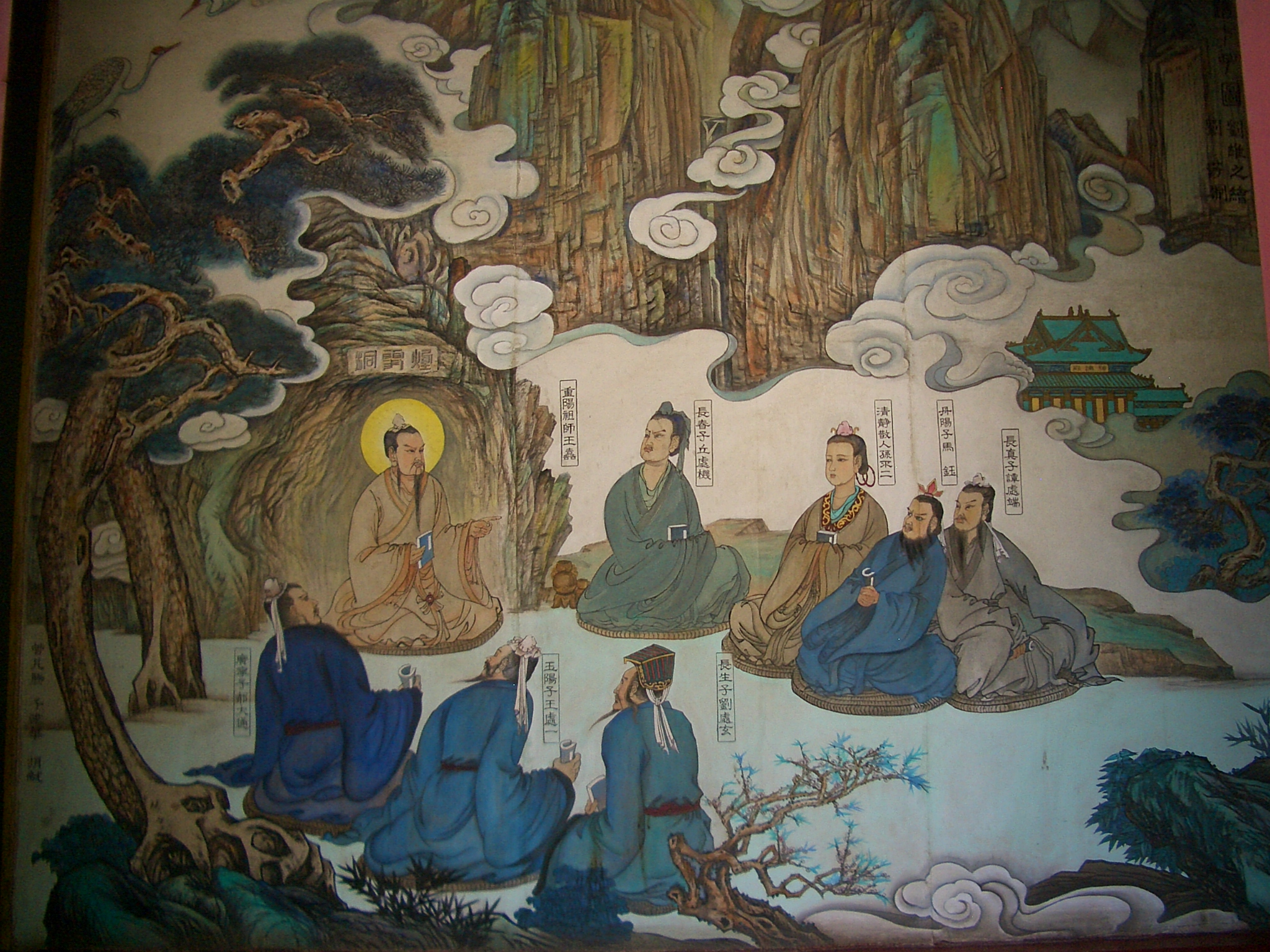
Wang Chongyang and his seven disciples, depicted in Changchun Temple, Wuhan city

The Quanzhen School (全真: Quánzhēn, "All-True", Complete Perfection, Integrating Perfection or Complete Reality) is currently one of the two dominant denominations of Daoism in China (the other being Zhengyi Dao or "Orthodox Unity"). It originated in the Shandong peninsula in 1170.

One of its founders was master Wang Chongyang (1113–1170). When the Mongols invaded China, the Quanzhen Taoists exerted great effort in keeping the peace, thus saving most Han Chinese lives.

Qiu Chuji, a major disciple of Wang, founded the Dragon Gate lineage (龍門派 Lóngmén pài), along with the White Cloud Monastery in Beijing. This tradition remains one of the largest Taoist sects in China today.

== Scriptures ==
According to Louis Komjathy, the three most important scriptures in the Quanzhen school are:

- The Dàodéjīng
- The Qīngjìng Jīng (清静经, Classic of Clarity and Stillness).
- Yǐnfújīng (Scripture on the Inner Talisman), a sixth-century text.

Komjathy writes that "these texts emphasize the central importance of Daoist self-cultivation focusing on the heart-mind, with purity of consciousness and spirit being primary."

After these, the writings of Wang Chongyang are also important. One particularly influential text of his is the Lijiao shiwu lun (Fifteen discourses to Establish the Teachings). In the Longmen (Dragon Gate) sub-school of Quanzhen, the writings of Qiu Chuji are also important.

== Foundation principles ==
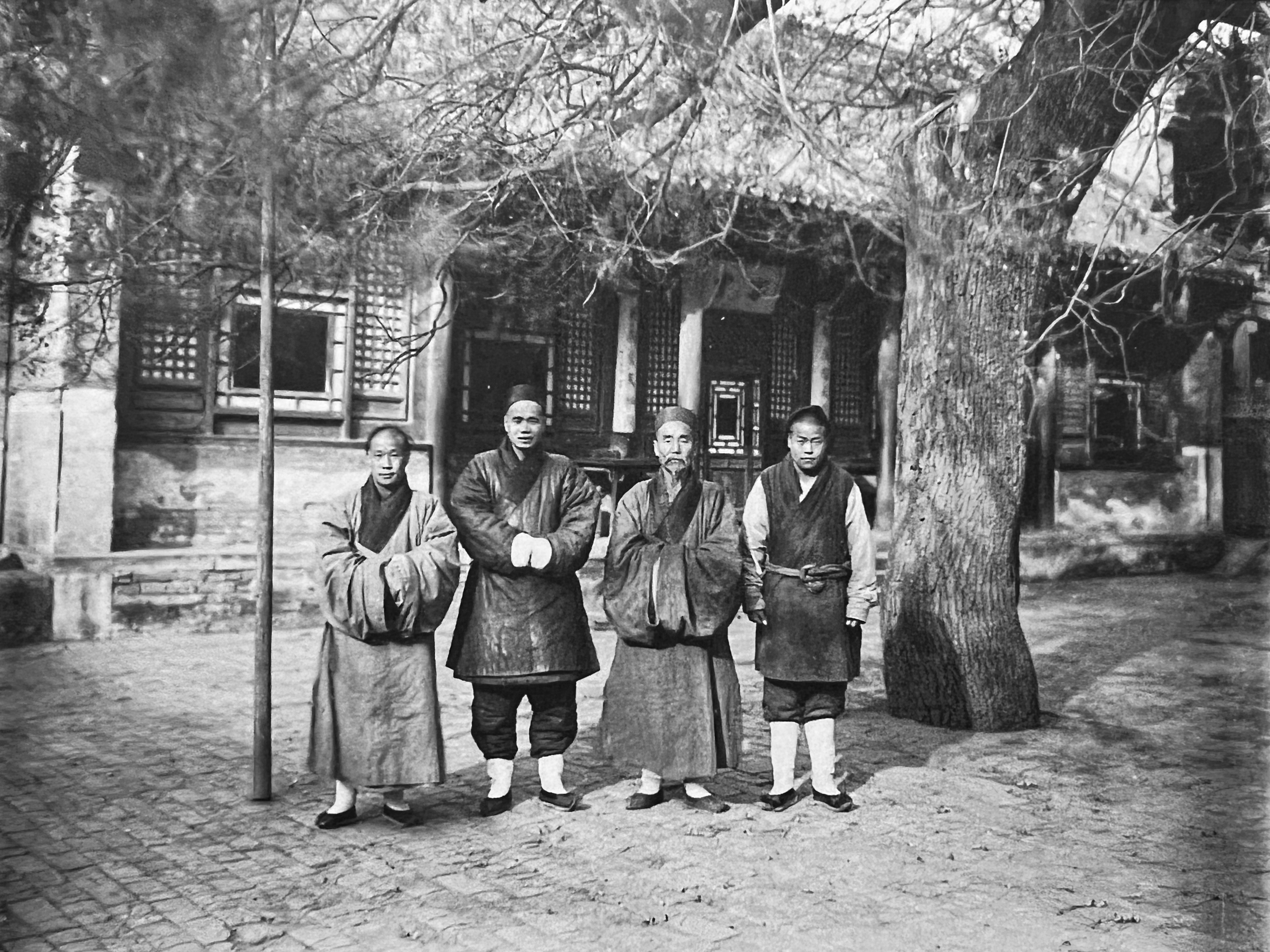
Taoist Priests in Beijing's White Cloud Temple (Qing Dynasty), a major temple of the Quanzhen tradition, circa 1900.

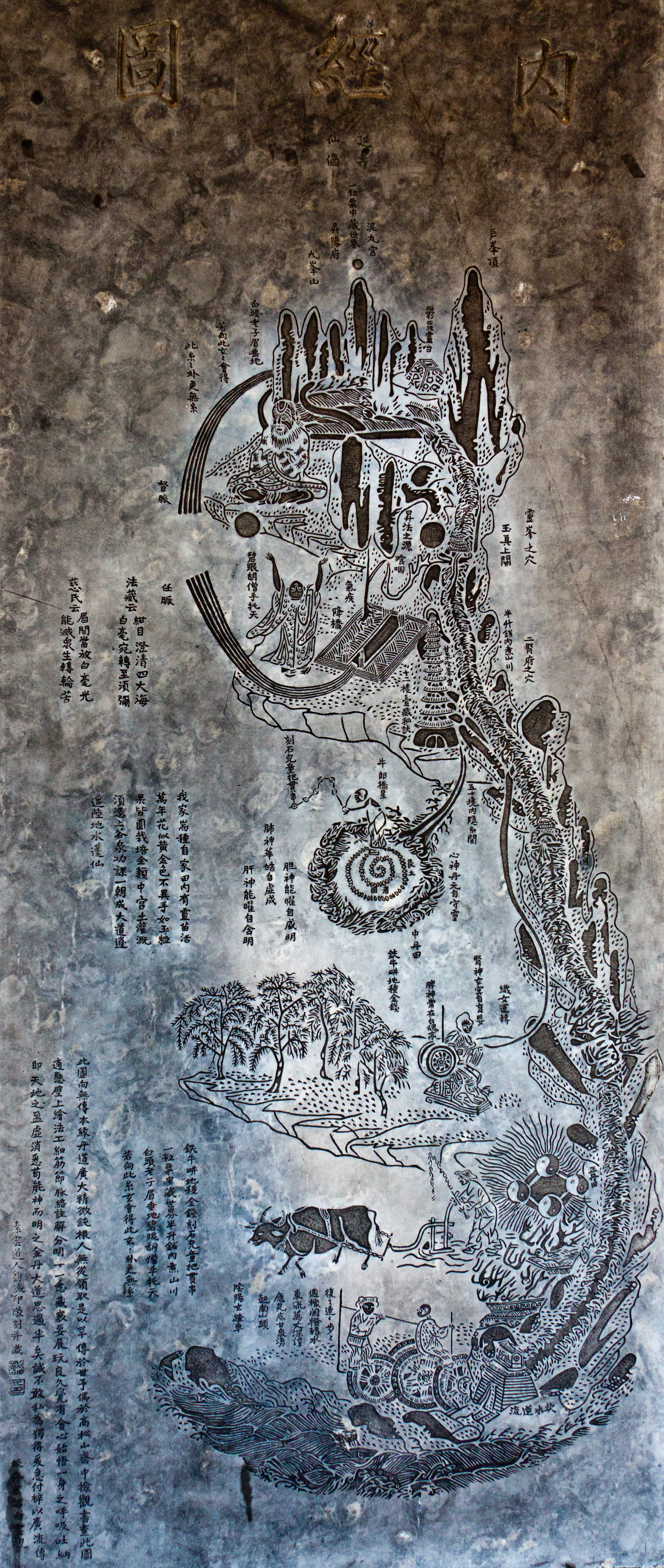
The "Diagram of Internal Pathways", an inner alchemy (neidan) diagram from an engraved stele at White Cloud Temple

Quanzhen can be translated literally as "All True" and for this reason, it is often called the "All Truth Religion" or the "Way of Completeness and Truth." In some texts, it is also referred to as the "Way of Complete Perfection." Kunyu mountain in Shandong province Weihai city is the birthplace of Quan Zhen Taoism. With strong Taoist roots, the Quanzhen School specializes in the process of "alchemy within the body" or Neidan (internal alchemy), as opposed to Waidan (external alchemy which experiments with the ingestion of herbs and minerals, etc.).

The Waidan tradition has been largely replaced by Neidan, as Waidan was a sometimes dangerous and lethal pursuit. Quanzhen focuses on internal cultivation of the person which is consistent with the pervading Taoist desire for attaining Wu Wei, which is essentially unconscious action.

Like most Taoists, Quanzhen priests were particularly concerned with longevity and immortality through alchemy, harmonising oneself with the Tao, studying the Five Elements, and ideas on balance consistent with Yin and Yang theory. The school is also known for using Buddhist and Confucian ideas.

Wang believed that the three teachings, Buddhism, Confucianism and Taoism were like three legs of a tripod, and promoted study of the Confucian Classic of Filial Piety and the Buddhist Heart Sutra.

The new Quanzhen school was highly popular in Jin-ruled Northern China as a reaction against the privileged place of Jurchens in the civil service examinations. It did not spread to the Southern Song, however.

== History ==
According to traditional legend, Wang Chongyang met two Taoist immortals in the summer of 1159 CE. The immortals, Zhongli Quan and Lü Dongbin taught him Taoist beliefs and trained him in secret rituals. The meeting proved deeply influential, and roughly a year later, in 1160, Wang met one of these men again. In this second encounter, he was provided with a set of five written instructions which led to his decision of living by himself in a grave he created for himself in Zhongnan Mountain for three years.

After seven years of living in the Mountain (three inside the grave and another four in a hut he later called "Complete Perfection Hut"), Wang met two of his seven future disciples, Tan Chuduan and Qiu Chuji. In 1167, Wang traveled to Shandong Province and met Ma Yu and Ma's wife Sun Bu'er who became his students. These and others would become part of the seven Quanzhen disciples, who were later known as the Seven Masters of Quanzhen.

After Wang's departure, it was left to his disciples to continue expounding the Quanzhen beliefs. Ma Yu succeeded Wang as head of the school, while Sun Bu'er went on to establish the Purity and Tranquility School, one of the foremost branches of Quanzhen.

Another notable disciple of Wang was Qiu Chuji who founded the famous White Cloud Monastery in Beijing. Qiu Chuji was the founder of the school called Dragon Gate Taoism. Qiu was on good terms with the Mongol ruler Genghis Khan who put him in charge of religious affairs similar to Mongol-controlled Iran. As a result, the Quanzhen School of Taoism continued to flourish long after Wang's death, right through to the present.

== Tenets ==
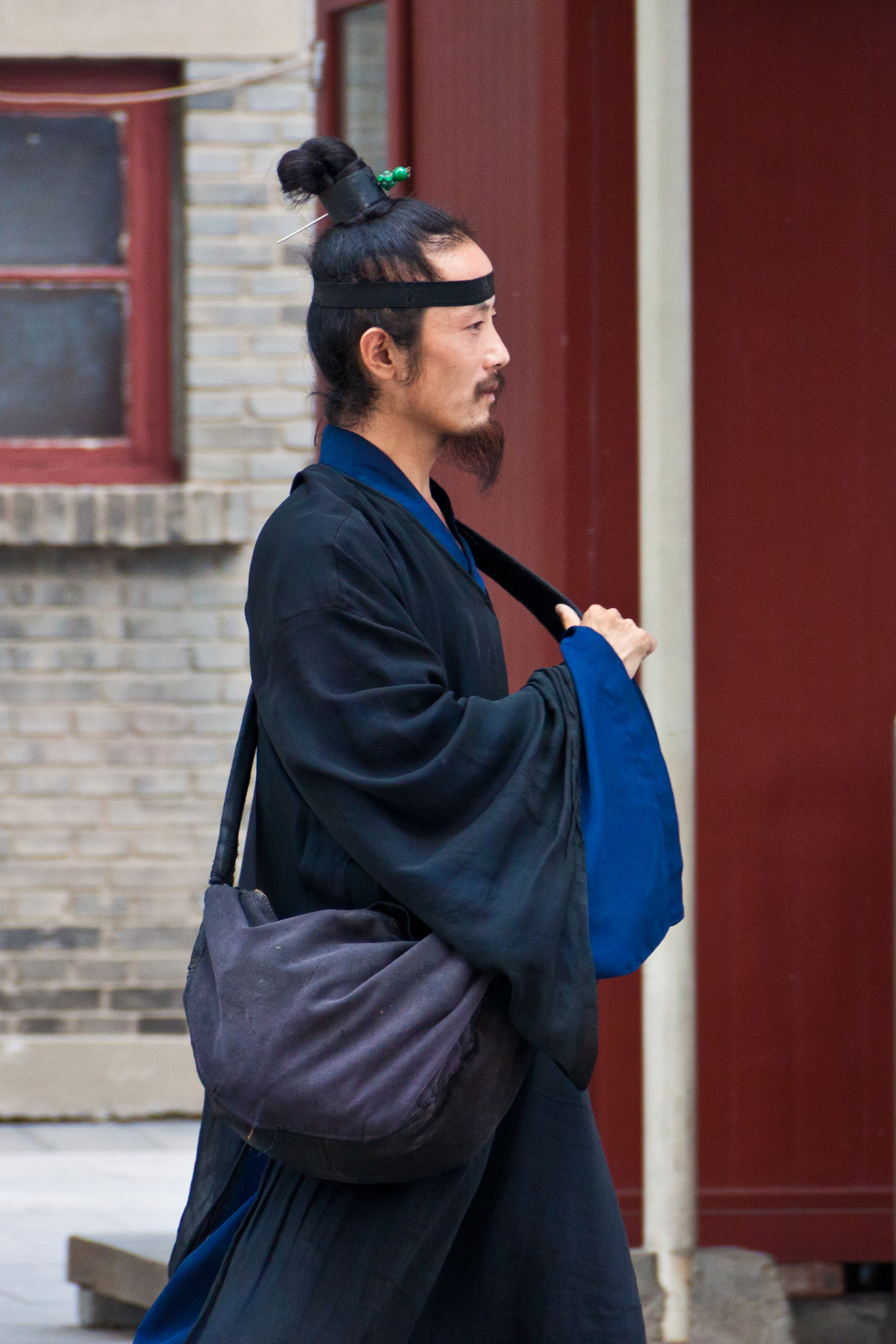
Longmen school priest

Quanzhen practices do not differ radically from other Taoist schools. A Quanzhen ordination certificate dated from 1244 shows that it used a Tang dynasty text for its precepts without any substantial changes. Quanzhen does however place particular emphasis on celibacy, which its adepts are expected to adhere to, and self-cultivation. Quanzhen disciple are expected to meditate on alchemical (Neidan) poems until reaching enlightenment. They do this in a cell to help sever ties to the mundane world.

== Branches and schools ==
The seven disciples of Wang Chongyang continue expounding the Quanzhen beliefs. The seven Masters of Quanzhen established the following seven branches.

- Ma Yu (馬鈺): Yuxian lineage (Meeting the Immortals, 遇仙派)
- Tan Chuduan (譚處端): Nanwu lineage (Southern Void, 南無派)
- Liu Chuxuan (劉處玄): Suishan lineage (Mount Sui, 隨山派)
- Qiu Chuji (丘處機): Longmen lineage (Dragon Gate Taoism, 龍門派)
- Wang Chuyi (王處一): Yushan lineage (Mount Yu, 崳山派)
- Hao Datong (郝大通): Huashan lineage (Mount Hua, 華山派)
- Sun Bu'er (孫不二): Qingjing lineage (Purity and Tranquility School, 清靜派)

== Bibliography ==
- Pregadio, Fabrizio (2008), The Encyclopedia of Taoism A-Z
