= Daoshi =

Priest in Taoism

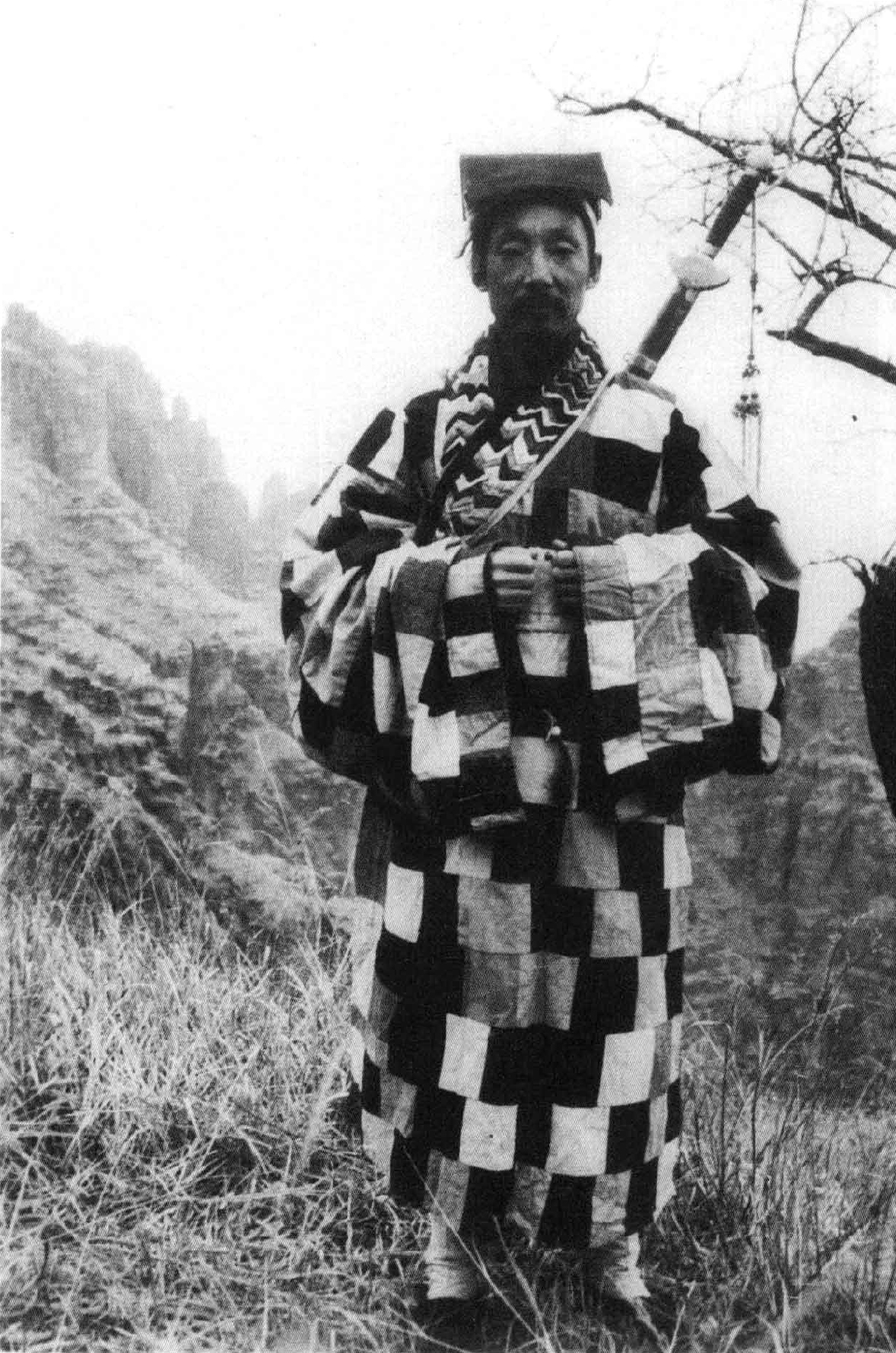
Taoist Priest Li Yuantong on Mount Langya, 1940s.

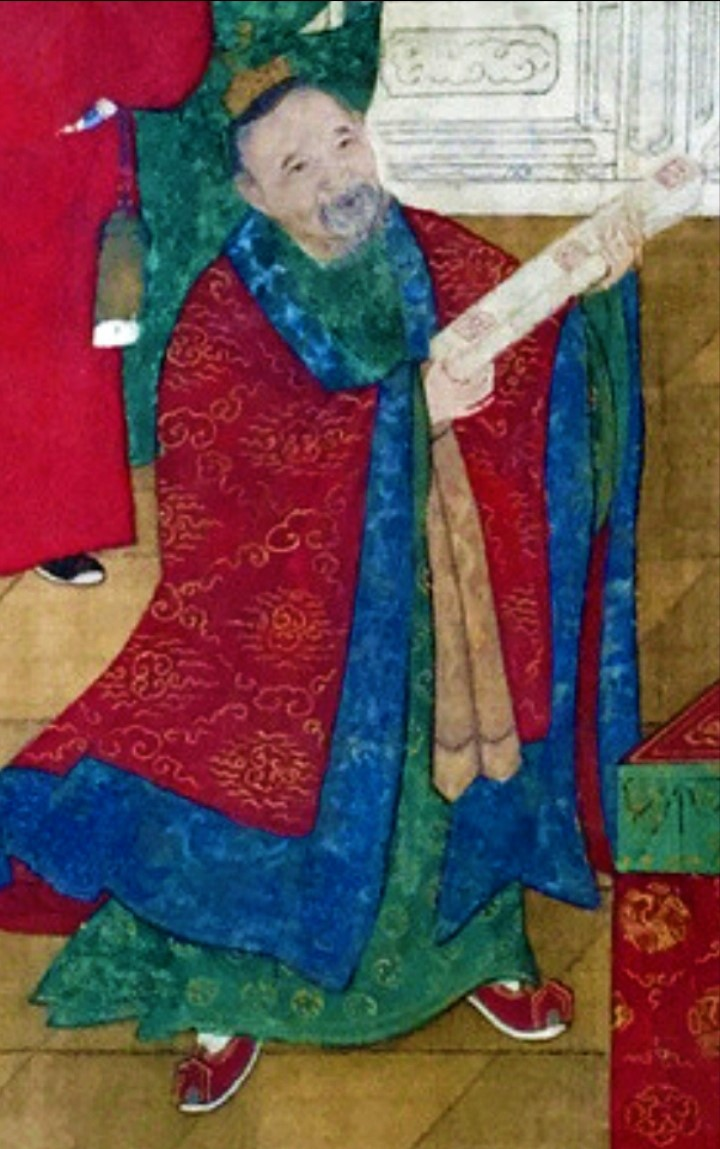
Shao Yuanjie, the taoist priest of the Jiajing Emperor of mid-Ming Dynasty.

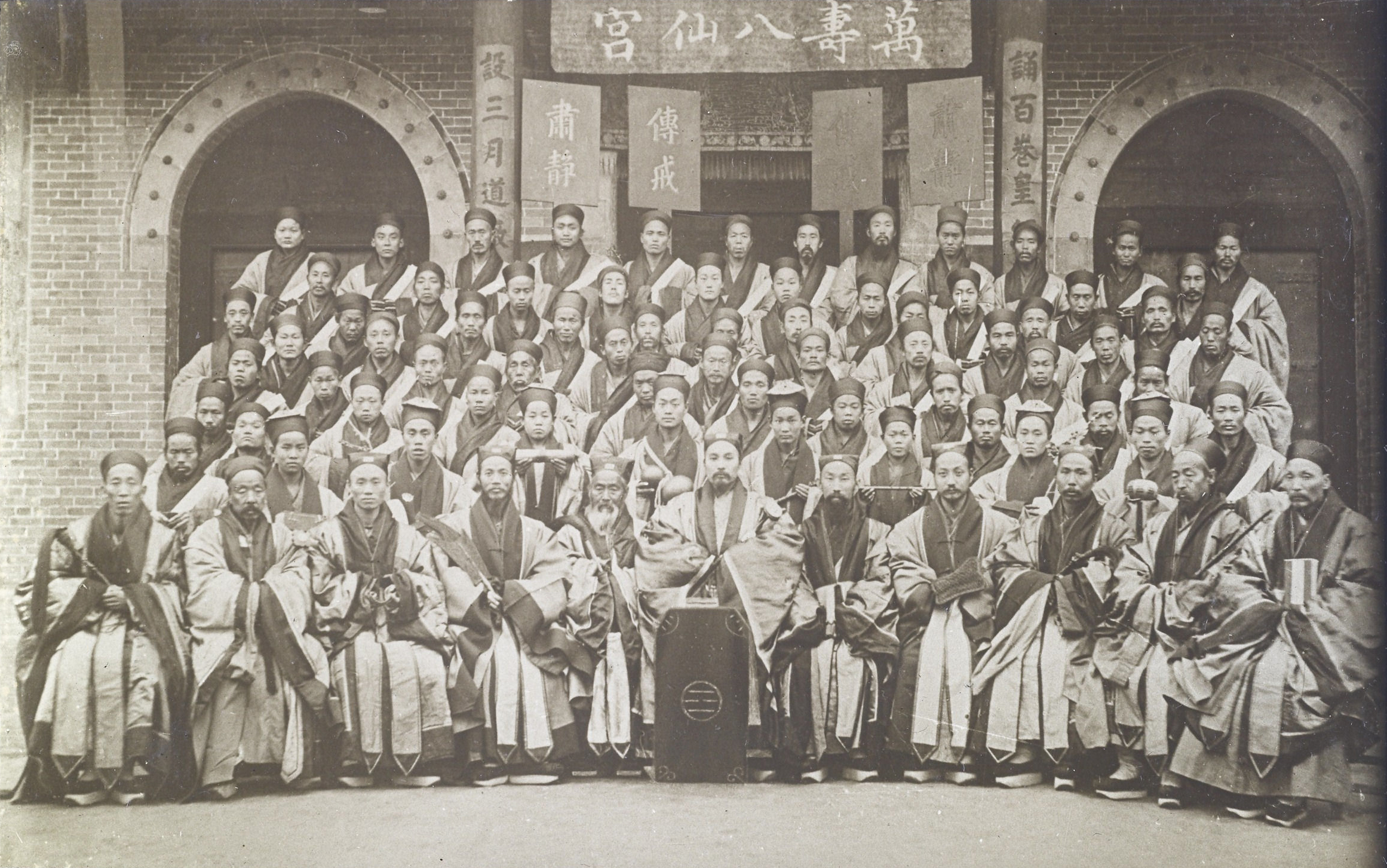
Taoist clergy of Baxian Temple, Xi'an, 1910-1911.

A daoshi (Chinese: 道士; pinyin: Dàoshì; Wade–Giles: tao^{4} shih^{4}; lit. 'scholar of the Tao') or Taoshih, translated as Taoist priest, Taoist monk, or Taoist professional is a priest in Taoism. The courtesy title of a senior daoshi is daozhang (道長, meaning "Tao master"), and a highly accomplished and revered daoshi is often called a zhenren (真人; "perfected person").

Along with Han Chinese priests, there are also many practicing ethnic minority priests in China. Some orders are monastic (Quanzhen orders), while the majority are not (Zhengyi orders). Some of the monastic orders are hermitic, and their members practice seclusion and ascetic lifestyles in the mountains, with the aim of becoming xian, or immortal beings. Nonmonastic priests live among the populace and manage and serve their own temples or popular temples.

The activities of the Taoists tend to be informed by materials which may be found in the Daozang (Taotsang), or Taoist Canon; however, Taoists generally choose or inherit specific texts which have been passed down for generations from teacher to student rather than consulting published versions of these works.

Traditionally, they were thought to be able to manipulate fate on their or their followers' behalf and they could grant miracles or inflict divine punishment on people in the afterlife or the mortal world.

== Orders ==
Taoist orders are traditionally classified into two main branches: Quanzhen and Zhengyi.

=== Quanzhen Taoism ===
Quanzhen Taoism, which is present almost exclusively in the north of China, includes all Taoist orders which have a monastic institution. Their lifestyle is comparable to that of the Buddhist monks in that they are celibate, vegetarian, and live in monasteries. The White Cloud Temple in Beijing is the main monastery of the Longmen school of Quanzhen, and is also the main headquarters of mainland China's official Taoist Church.

=== Zhengyi Taoism ===
The other main branch of the priesthood is Zhengyi Taoism, in which priests may marry, eat meat, live in their own homes, and found and manage their own temples or serve in existing folk religious temples. They are mostly part-time and hold other jobs. Their lineages are transmitted through training and ordination by another priest, although historically they received formal confirmation in their role by the Celestial Master, the highest priest. Fragmentation of the lineage of the Celestial Masters has made Zhengyi priests more independent. In mainland China, the Taoist Church has in theory taken over the power to govern the priesthood (although only a minority are registered with the Church). Zhengyi orders are present all over China, although with different names according to the local lineages. For example, in northern China there are the Yinyang masters of the Lingbao sub-tradition.

== By Period ==
=== Pre-Ming Period ===
During the Period of Division, officials were divided into nine different ranks; the lower the Grade, the higher status they were. Taoist priests were given Grade Five status and above, and were permitted to participate in formal rituals (科儀; keyi) since they were educated in internal cultivation (內功; neigong). Taoist priests not trained in neigong were relegated to Grade Six status or lower, and bore the title of "Three-Five Surveyor of Merit” (三五度公; sanwu dugong.

=== Ming (1368–1644) ===
==== Classification and Outside View ====
During the Ming Dynasty, Taoism and Buddhism were state-sponsored religions, with all others banned. Taoist priests were often classified by two categories, zhù guān (住觀) priests live in designated temples, while yóu guān (遊觀) priests drifted around with no fixed residence. During the period, Taoist priests were largely viewed positively by the public, though some were skeptical about the credibility of their alchemy, fortune-telling, and divination.

Taoist priests organized themselves into different categories, and assigned themselves different jobs based on their rankings. Both Taoist priests and priestesses performed rituals. Their rankings were included when Taoist priests signed records for rituals which would be burned for certain rituals, such as the Yellow Register Zhai (黃籙齋) rituals, or burial rituals, and Golden Register Jiao (金籙醮), or temple renewal-type rituals. Some scholars tasked themselves with copying down the manuscripts before they were burned in the ritual.

The Taoist belief system was also seen as legitimate by many during the middle Ming period when, with the growth of commerce in the state, it became a trend for different industries to worship their own Taoist patron gods. For example, ink makers would worship Wénchāng Dìjūn (文昌帝君), ironsmiths would worship Tàishàng Lǎojūn (太上老君), and prostitutes and thieves would worship Guǎn Zhòng (管仲) and Shí Qiān (時遷), in many ways to prove the legitimacy of their occupations.

==== Regulation and examinations ====
As previously mentioned, in 1374, the Ming government banned all religions other than Buddhism and Taoism. This was good for Taoism, as it meant that it could continue to exist above ground, but this also brought with it much government regulation. That same year, an examination system was introduced, whereby would-be priests had to sit an exam in the capital, held once every three years. Only those having sufficient knowledge of Taoist literature and who passed the test were licensed by the government as official priests. Upon passing, the newly qualified priests would receive a dù dié (度牒) clerical certificate, which served as their state license to practise.

In 1392, during the reign of Taizu, a minimum age was decreed, with only men over 40 years old and women over 50 years old being allowed to become priests. These restrictions, however, changed over time, as in 1419 laws stated that only those above 14 and below 20 years old, and whose parents both approved, would be allowed to study Taoist classics in temples and sit for the examination after five years, resulting in priests being younger than was previously required. Those who passed would be given the dudie, while the others would have to secularize. Teenagers whose parents or grandparents did not have other offspring to depend on were not allowed to become monks or priests. Those older than 30 or younger than 40 years old, who were once monks or priests but later secularized, were not allowed to become priests again.

In 1380, the government also restricted the number of priests by imposing regional quotas for both Buddhist and Taoist priests, 40 for each prefecture fǔ (府), 30 for each independent department zhōu (州), and 20 for each county xiàn (縣). These quotas were not strictly enforced in the remote provinces which had been loosely regulated until the Yongle reign (1403-1425), during which Taoist regulatory agencies were established in these provinces and quotas were enforced. During the Yingzong reign (1435-1464), the quotas as well as other regulations started to be undermined, with counts of priests far exceeding their regional quotas and dudie being sold to priests who had not passed the official examination.

Ming criminal law also had some very strict regulations for priests. Since 1398, the Ming law books stated that owning a dudie was the only valid proof of identity for Buddhist monks and Taoist priests. Falsely claiming to be a priest without this identification was punishable with 80 lashings. If self-declared priests were tonsured by their family members, those family members were also guilty. If a priest managing a temple accepts unlicensed priests, they would be charged with the same crime and then forced to secularize.

Despite the threat of these punishments, the regulations started to degrade and enforcement became increasingly loose during the mid to late Ming. After 1435, dudie abuse became widespread, while the quota system was increasingly ignored. In the mid to late Ming, more than 10,000 dudie were issued every period, compared to the mere hundreds issued in the early Ming. The three-year issuing period was also often changed depending on the will of the government.

The government itself was partly to blame for the increasing abuse. For instance, after 1487, in the wake of famines or other natural disasters, the government would often issue large numbers of dudie as a way of increasing state income. Sometimes during famine, a dudie could be acquired not only with a monetary purchase, but even by trading in grains to the state.

==== Daily life and clothing ====
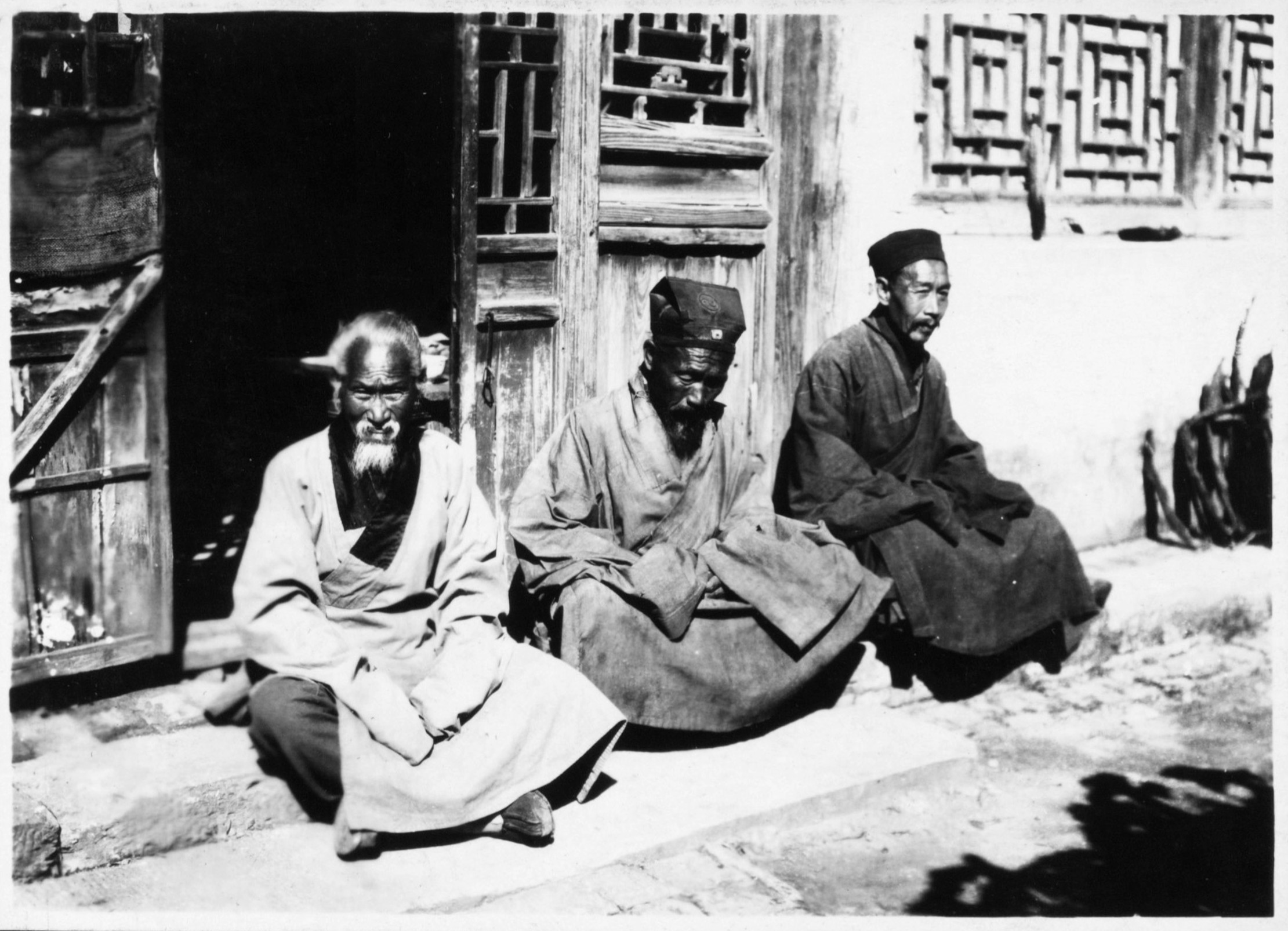
Three Taoists in front of White Cloud Temple, Beijing, 1931.

During the late Ming, morning and evening study sessions had become a daily practice in most Taoist temples, especially those of the Quánzhēn (全真) branch. This daily study of the Taoist classics was likely influenced by similar Buddhist scholastic practices at the time.

Taoist dress during the Ming Dynasty was said to not have changed much from that of previous dynasties. In a book written by the Prince of Ning Zhū Quán (朱權), he states that the clothing of Taoist priests in Ming was not too different from the “ancient” style of the Northern and Southern dynasties (420-589 AD).

Laws from 1382 regulated the dress of Taoist priests of different rankings. Those who worked as officials in the capital were to wear red robes with golden embroidery, those who worked as officials elsewhere were to wear un-ornamented red robes, and common priests were to wear teal robes.

==== Rituals and practices ====
During the Ming dynasty, some Taoist priests were hired to create and perform musical performances where they often danced or played musical instruments for their patrons. Taoist priests also participated in death rituals. However, some wealthy families objected to hiring Taoist priests for their funerals due to their Confucian beliefs that argued against the lavish musical performances of Taoist funerals. Taoist priests also chose whether to marry or not; to continue the hereditary title, the Celestial Master had to be married to pass the title to an eligible male heir.

Taoist priests were also expected to perform various kinds of exorcisms and rituals for people who wanted a cure disease, resolve drought, etc. Such processes were detailed in Thunder Magic texts, which detailed which and when certain ritual items were needed and place, such as placing a talisman on some rice. Such rituals were performed near or at temples and other pure areas away from the public eye, and if the homeowners allowed it, the priests were able to enter their homes and erect a sacred space to perform the ritual. It is believed that the shortage of such texts from earlier periods were due to the high standards of the officials that approved them and the biased beliefs that these rituals were related to shamanistic ideas and rituals.

=== Qing (1644-1911) ===
Along with ritualistic services, Taoist priests also were visited by people for fortunetelling, explanations for events, and healing services which consisted of using medicine or acupuncture. Some Taoist priests devised new medicinal recipes to which some saw favorable outcomes.

Taoist temples were used as places people could donate to fund new communal structures like bridges or roads.

== Clothing ==
- Han Chinese clothing
- Daojiao fushi
- Daopao

== In popular culture ==
Taoist priest and monk characters have appeared in many movies, including the following...

- The 1960 The Enchanting Shadow
- The 1979 Legend of the Mountain
- The 1980 Clan of the White Lotus
- The 1983 Zu Warriors from the Magic Mountain
- The 1985 Mr. Vampire
- The 1987 A Chinese Ghost Story
- The 1990 A Chinese Ghost Story II
- The 1991 A Chinese Ghost Story III
- The 2004 Kill Bill: Volume 2 (the character Pai Mei)
- The 2015 Monk Comes Down the Mountain
- The 2018 Grandmaster of Demonic Cultivation
- The 2024 Demonte Colony 2

== See also ==
- Chinese ritual mastery traditions
- Fulu (Talisman)
- Ten precepts (Taoism)
- Taoism
- Xian (Taoism)
- Zhenren

== Sources ==
- Jones, Stephen. 2007. Ritual and Music of North China: Shawm Bands in Shanxi. Ashgate. ISBN 0754661636
