= King Father of the East =

Taoist god

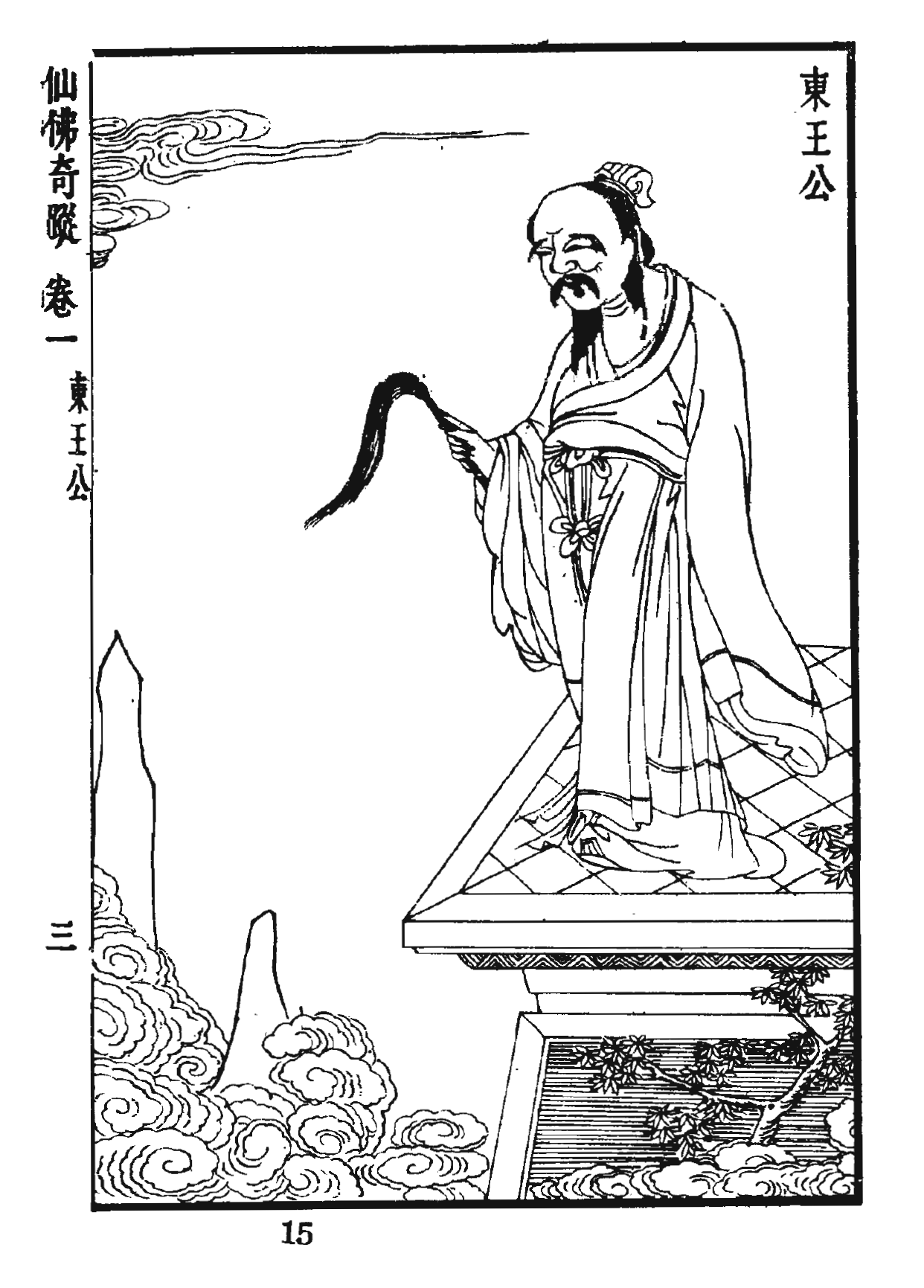
Dongwanggong

King Father of the East, also known as Dongwanggong (東王公), is the tutelary deity of the Taoist immortals. Legends say that the King Father of the East is the consort of Queen Mother of the West. He is the manifestation of yang energy.

== Legends ==
When the Queen Mother of the West (Xiwangmu) was a mountain demon, she was in love with the King Father of the East (Dongwanggong). Xiwangmu ruled the west and Dongwanggong ruled the east. In some versions of the Chinese creation myth, the two lovers created humanity through their union.

According to one text in the Classic of Mountains and Seas, there was a bronze pillar on Kunlun Mountain that was so tall that it reached the sky. On top of this column, there was a huge bird named Xiyou (literally meaning "rare"). Under its left wing, it held Dongwanggong and under its right wing, it held Xiwangmu. When Xiwangmu first met Dongwanggong, she had to climb onto the bird's wing to reach him.

In another account, Dongwanggong lived in a big stone house on the East Wild Mountain. He was about ten feet high, and his hair was as white as snow. He looked like a man but had a bird's face and a tiger's tail. He rode a black bear and often played a game of throwing arrows/sticks into a pot with a Jade Maiden.

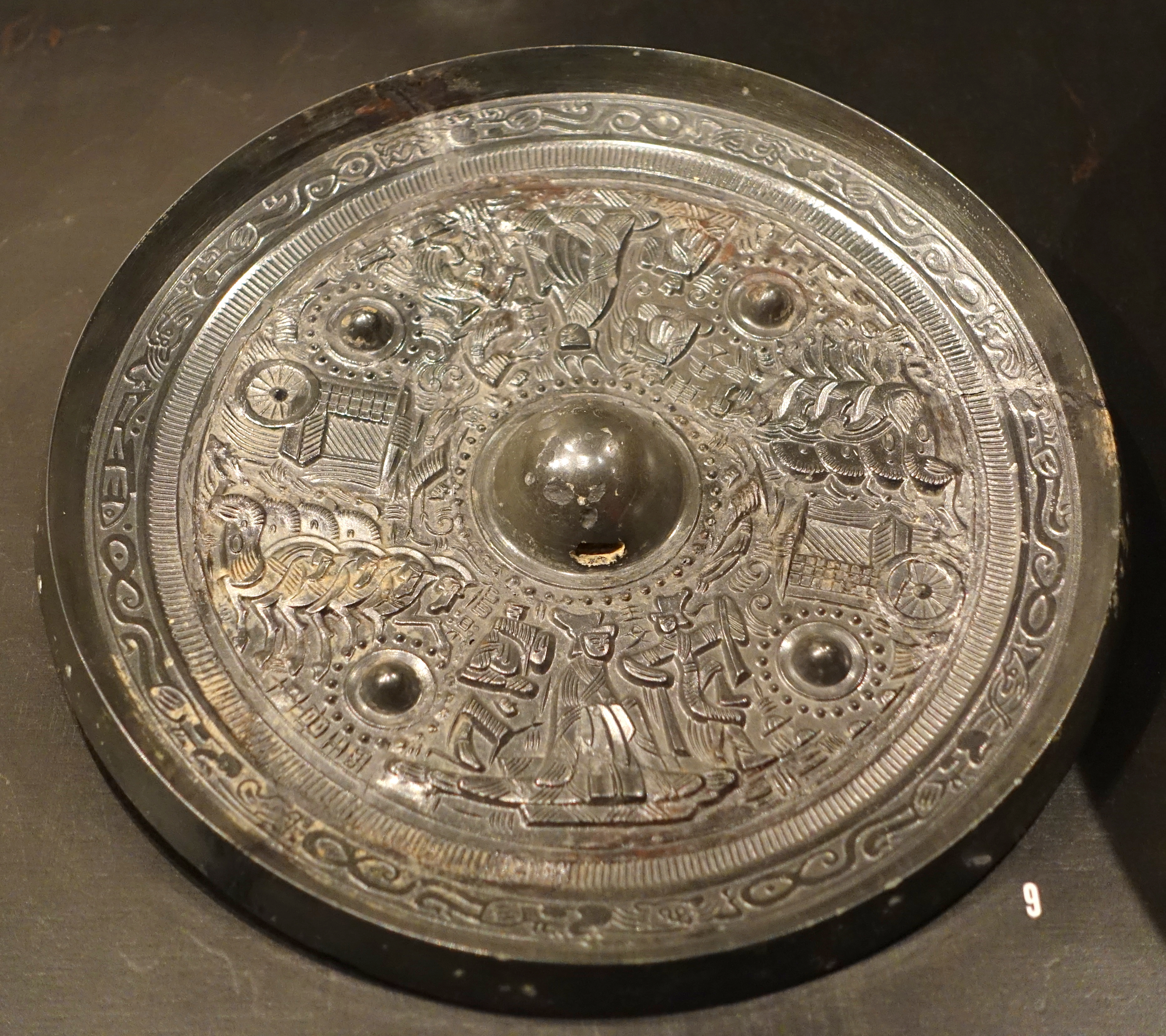
Dongwanggong, and Xiwangmu depicted on a mirror of Han dynasty (25-220 AD)

The Book of Gods and Wonders (神異經) describes him as a white-maned being, again with a bird's face and tiger's tail, mounted on a black bear. One of the earliest notations of this pair appears as an inscription on a bronze mirror cast in 106 CE. The King Father of the East is paired with the Queen Mother of the West. The inscription wishes for fortune and longevity like the two of them.

Many Taoist mythological works describe him as born of the Pure and the Holy Mother of Origins, ruling the animated beings and the yin and yang that breathes from the eastern sky. The god of Mount Tai, Mountain Dongyue Dadi, is said to be his younger brother.

In the tradition of the alchemists, Quanzhen School, in particular, Wang Xuanfu, master of Zhongli Quan and first of the Five Ancestors of the North, is his avatar, according to Lü Dongbin.

There is another legend that honors the King Father of the East as the Heavenly Father and the Queen Mother of the West as the Heavenly Mother. King Father of the East transforms essence, and Queen Mother of the West transforms blood.

== See also ==
- Nongpok Ningthou, Sovereign God of the East
