= Wang Chongyang =

Founder of Quanzhen Taoism

- 王重阳
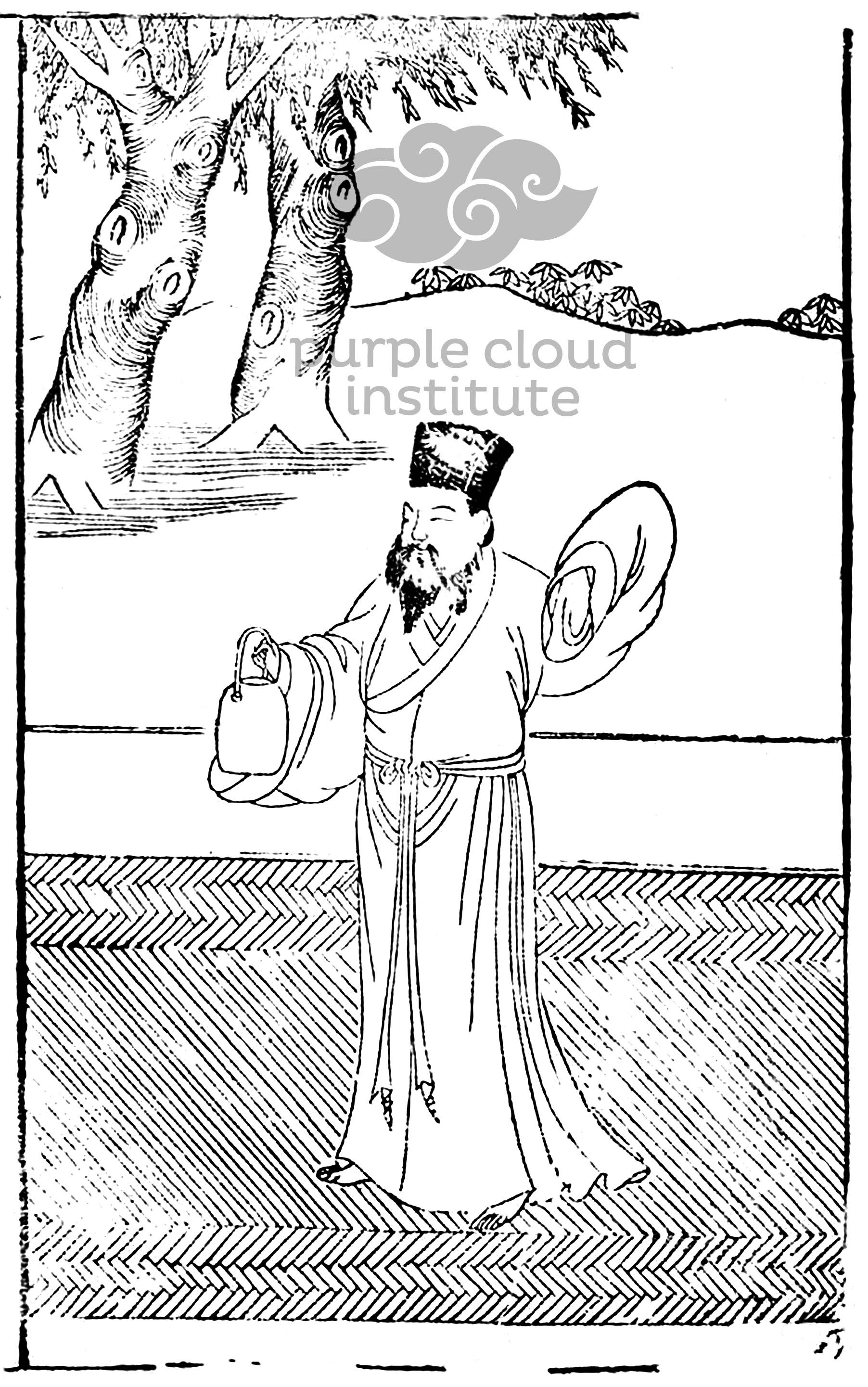

Personal life
- Born: Wang Zhongfu; 11 January 1113 Jingzhao Xianyang, Song Empire
- Died: 22 January 1170 (aged 57) Kaifeng, Jin Empire
- Known for: Founder of Quanzhen School
- Other name: Wang Zhe

Religious life
- Religion: Taoism
- School: Quanzhen School
- Monastic name: Chongyang

Senior posting
- Successor: Ma Yu
- Reason for exit: deceased

Wang Chongyang
- Traditional Chinese: 王重陽
- Simplified Chinese: 王重阳
Transcriptions
Standard Mandarin
- Hanyu Pinyin: Wáng Chóngyáng
- Wade–Giles: Wang Ch'ung-yang

Wang Chongyang (11 January 1113 – 22 January 1170; Chinese calendar: 22nd day, 12th month, 2nd year, Zhenghe era in the reign of Emperor Huizong of Song - 4th day, 1st month, 10th year, Dading era in the reign of Emperor Shizong of Jin) (Note: 宋徽宗政和二年十二月廿二 – 金世宗大定十年正月初四) is the founder of the Quanzhen school of Taoism. In his life he had many devotees and followers, but formally accepted seven major disciples which are known as the Seven Perfected or the Seven Masters of Quanzhen: Ma Danyang, Qiu Chuji, Tan Chuduan, Liu Chuxuan, Hao Datong, Wang Chuyi, and Sun Bu’er. Wang Chongyang is one of the Five Northern Patriarchs of Quanzhen, which in order they are: Wang Xuanfu 王玄甫, Zhongli Quan 钟离权, Lü Dongbin 吕洞宾, Liu Haichan 刘海蟾, Wang Chongyang 王重阳. He is also one of the Eight Immortals of Taoism.

== Name ==
- Family name: Wang (王)
- Given names: Zhongfu (中孚); Dewei (德威); Zhe (喆)
- Courtesy names: Yunqing (允卿); Shixiong (世雄); Zhiming (知明)
- Pseudonym: Chongyangzi (重陽子)

== Life ==
Wang was born with his birth name as "Zhongfu" in a wealthy family in 1113. He was educated in Chinese classics and martial arts.

His family had been a prominent local clan for generations. He loved reading from a young age, later entered the prefectural school, and passed the imperial examination. In the early years of Emperor Xizong of Jin's Tianjuan era (1138-1140), he took the military examination, passed the first-class examination category, and became the top scholar in the military examinations. He then changed his name to Dewei, with the courtesy name Shixiong.

Later, despite having achieved top honours in both civil and military examinations, he served as a minor official in charge of collecting wine for a long time. Then he resigned and withdrew to his home, spending his days numbing himself with alcohol.

According to tradition, in the summer of 1159 when he was 48, he met two Taoist immortals in a tavern in Ganhe Town, Zhongnan, Shaanxi, Zhongli Quan and Lü Dongbin. They taught him the true secrets of Taoist cultivation. He changed his name to "Zhe" and adopted the Taoist name "Chongyang".

Wang Chongyang need a place to conduct his coltivation so he dug up a tomb at the eastern edge of his village near Mount Zhongnan, and called it the “Tomb of the Living Dead”. This tomb "was a mound of dirt several feet high, with a ten-foot-high ceiling dug under it. Near the entrance to this underground enclosure Wang placed a plaque that read, "Wang Haifeng" (Lunatic Wang)." He stayed here for three years during which he became an immortal and attained the Tao.

After three years, the two immortals came again and instructed him to spread the Tao and save the people. In particular they ordered him to go to Shandong and find Qiu, Liu, Tan and Ma.

Therefore, in the seventh year of the Dading era of Jin dynasty (1167), Wang Chongyang burnt down his thatched hut and left Shaanxi to journey east to Shandong to carry out his mission.

When arrived in Ninghai, Shandong, he first found Ma Danyang, which was married with Sun Bu'er. Ma recognized immediately Wang Chongyang as an immortal and became his disciple. Ma Danyang ordered the construction of an hut in the garden of his mansion where his master went to reside and conduct his practice. This hut was called by Wang Chongyang "Quanzhen Hut" (全真庵 Quanzhen an)—this is where the name of the Quanzhen school comes from. Soon after, Sun Bu'er also recognized him as her master; so she departed to carry on her cultivation in seclusion, following the instructions of the female internal alchemy handed by Wang Chongyang.

In the ninth month of 1167 Qiu Chuji arrived at the Quanzhen Hut. Nineteen years old at the time, he had heard that an immortal was residing in the Ma family's mansion so he hurried to meet him and became his disciple. Later Tan Chuduan, Liu Chuxuan, Wang Chuyi and Hao Datong also became his disciples.

During this years, Wang Chongyang established five congregations in Shandong:

- Three Teachings Seven Treasures Congregation (三教七宝会Sanjiao qibao hui). Established in August of 1168 at Jiang Bao'an Temple in Wendeng.
- Three Teachings Golden Lotus Congregation (三教金莲会 Sanjiao jinlian hui). Established in April 1169 at the "Golden Lotus Hall" in Ninghai.
- Three Teachings Three Lights Congregation (三教三光会 Sanjiao sanguang hui). Established in September 1169 in Fushan County.
- Three Teachings Equality Congregation (三教平等会 Sanjiao pingdeng hui). Established in 1169 in Dengzhou (present-day Penglai).
- Three Teachings Jade Flower Congregation (三教玉华会 Sanjiao yuhua hui). The last one, established in Laizhou.

Collectively known as the "Three Prefectures and Five Congregations", they were mass religious organizations established by Wang Chongyang during his time in Shandong to promote the Quanzhen school of Taoism. These congregations were characterized by the common name of "Three Teachings" (三教 Sanjiao), as Wang promoted the synthesis of the Three Teachings of Taoism, Buddhism, and Confucianism.

In the ninth year of the Dading era of Jin dynasty (1169), Wang Chongyang returned westward with his disciples Ma, Tan, Liu, and Qiu. He died in Daliang (now Kaifeng, Henan) a few months later, in January 22, 1170 (the fourth day of the first month of the tenth year of the Dading era of the Jin dynasty), at the age of 58. The four disciples Ma, Tan, Liu, and Qiu carried his coffin to his former residence in Liujiang Village, Zhongnan Mountain (present-day Zu'an Town, Huyi County, Xi'an City, Shaanxi), where they conducted the burial and funeral rites. The Quanzhen School revered this place as the Ancestral Hut (祖庵 Zu'an). The four disciples stayed here together for three years, after that they parted way, each one carrying on his own cultivation.

The Ancestral Hut where Wang Chongyang was buried is now Chongyang Palace, which attracts visitors and believers worldwide.

In the sixth year of the Yuan dynasty's Zhiyuan era, he was posthumously honored as "True Lord, Enlightener of the Complete True Nature, Chongyang" (重阳全真开化真君 Chongyang Quanzhen Kaihua Zhenjun). In the third year of the Yuan dynasty's Zhida era (1310), he was further honored as "Emperor of the Assisting Pole, Enlightener of the Complete True Nature, Chongyang" (重阳全真开化辅极帝君 Chongyang Quanzhen Kaihua Fuji Dijun).

== Teaching ==
Wang Chongyang advocated the cultivation of internal alchemy (内丹 neidan) through which the practitioners take their own body as the cauldron to refine the internal elixir and transcend the mundane.

Wang Chongyang, as previously mentioned, promoted the unity of the Three Teachings (Confucianism, Taoism, and Buddhism), so the practitioners had to study the Tao Te Ching, the Classic of Filial Piety and the Heart Sutra.

The internal alchemy practice is accompanied by the cultivation of one's character in the world. To accumulate merits and deeds is of paramount importance to attain the Tao. This is done through filial piety, helping people, and basically by being a good human.

To practice does not just mean sitting with closed eyes, but rather being costantly observant of the heart-mind while sitting, standing, lying and walking, so that becomes like Mount Tai, still and clear. This is possible only by reducing one's emotions and desires.

Wang Chongyang advocated monastic life and cultivation in seclusion, promoting the monastic community of Taoist priests residing in temples: this was a major characteristic of the early Quanzhen school. All those who wished to renounce their worldly life were invited to first reside in a hut. Because a hut is a dwelling, it provides a person with a place to rely on. When the body has something to rely on and support, the mind gradually becomes stable, and the qi and shen will harmonize and flow smoothly. Wang Chongyang also valued group practice, suggesting that practitioners should "have fellow practitioners," but he had specific requirements for these companions.

Wang Chongyang advocated eliminating worldly desires. He once told Ma Yu, "Ordinary people entering the Dao must abstain from wine, women, wealth, anger, clinging to desires, and worries; there is no other remedy." He believed that these would lead to depravity, confusion, and loss of spirit and vitality. Therefore, one's lifestyle should be simple. He also taught his disciples to maintain inner peace, live a simple and natural life, and cultivate their innate nature and life-destiny.

The cultivation of both innate nature and life-destiny (性命双修 xingming shuangxiu) is a characteristic of the Quanzhen school. In his Fifteen Essays to Establish the Teaching he says: "Inner nature is shen, life-destiny is qi. If innate nature meets life-destiny, it is like a bird catching the wind, soaring lightly, achieving success with little effort." This shows that he considered both innate nature and life-destiny important in cultivation, mutually enhancing each other.

== Writings ==
Wang was the author of many poems of Taoist instruction. According to legend, Liu Chuxuan became a follower of Wang after reading one of Wang's poems.

Wang's writings include:

- Perfected Chongyang's Formula of the Golden Gate and the Jade Lock (重阳真人金关玉锁诀 Chongyang Zhenren Jin Guan Yu Suo Jue): Discusses the principles of cultivation in a question-and-answer format.
- The Five Numinous Writings (五篇灵文 Wu Pian Ling Wen): The content is divided into five chapters: Jade Liquid, Production of Medicine, Gathering of Medicine, Obtaining Medicine, and Nourishing Medicine. It is a high-level guide to internal alchemy practice. An english translation is available, included in Ling Bao Tong Zhi Neng Gong Shu.
- The Twenty-Four Secrets of Danyang Transmitted by the Perfected Chongyang (重阳真人授丹阳二十四诀 Chongyang zhenren shou danyang ershisi jue): Employing a question-and-answer format between master and disciple, it elucidates the essentials of internal alchemy around terms such as "nature and life," "dragon and tiger," and "lead and mercury," highlighting the core practice of "enlightening the mind and seeing one's true nature."
- "Fifteen Essays to Establish the Teaching" (重阳立教十五论 Chongyang lijiao shiwu lun): This treatise systematically expounds the fundamental tenets and principles of practice of the Quanzhen School, comprising fifteen essays. It covers essential aspects of practice, including living in hermitages, cloud wandering, sitting practice, stilling the mind, cultivating one's nature, and transcending the three realms. It is considered one of the foundational text of the Quanzhen school.
- "An Anthology of Quanzhen by Chongyang" (重阳全真集 Chongyang Quanzhen Ji): Comprising thirteen volumes, it compiles over a thousand poems by Wang Chongyang, expressing his aspirations and promoting the Quanzhen doctrine. It is the primary text for understanding his practice and literary style.
- "Chongyang's Anthology on Teaching Transformation" (重阳教化集 Chongyang Jiaohua Ji): This is a compilation of Wang Chongyang's sayings on teaching his disciples. Some versions overlap with the content of "Chongyang's Anthology of the Ten Transformations by Dividing Pears".
- "Chongyang's Anthology of the Ten Transformations by Dividing Pears" (重阳分梨十化集 Chongyang fenli shihua ji): Comprising two volumes, this work specifically recounts the process by which Wang Chongyang converted Ma Danyang and his wife. Through poems and songs, it conveys the essential principles of internal alchemy and is a valuable resource for studying the master-disciple lineage of the Quanzhen School of Taoism. In a question-and-answer format between master and disciple, its core content revolves around twenty-four terms, including "innate nature and life-destiny", "dragon and tiger", and "lead and mercury".

== Disciples ==
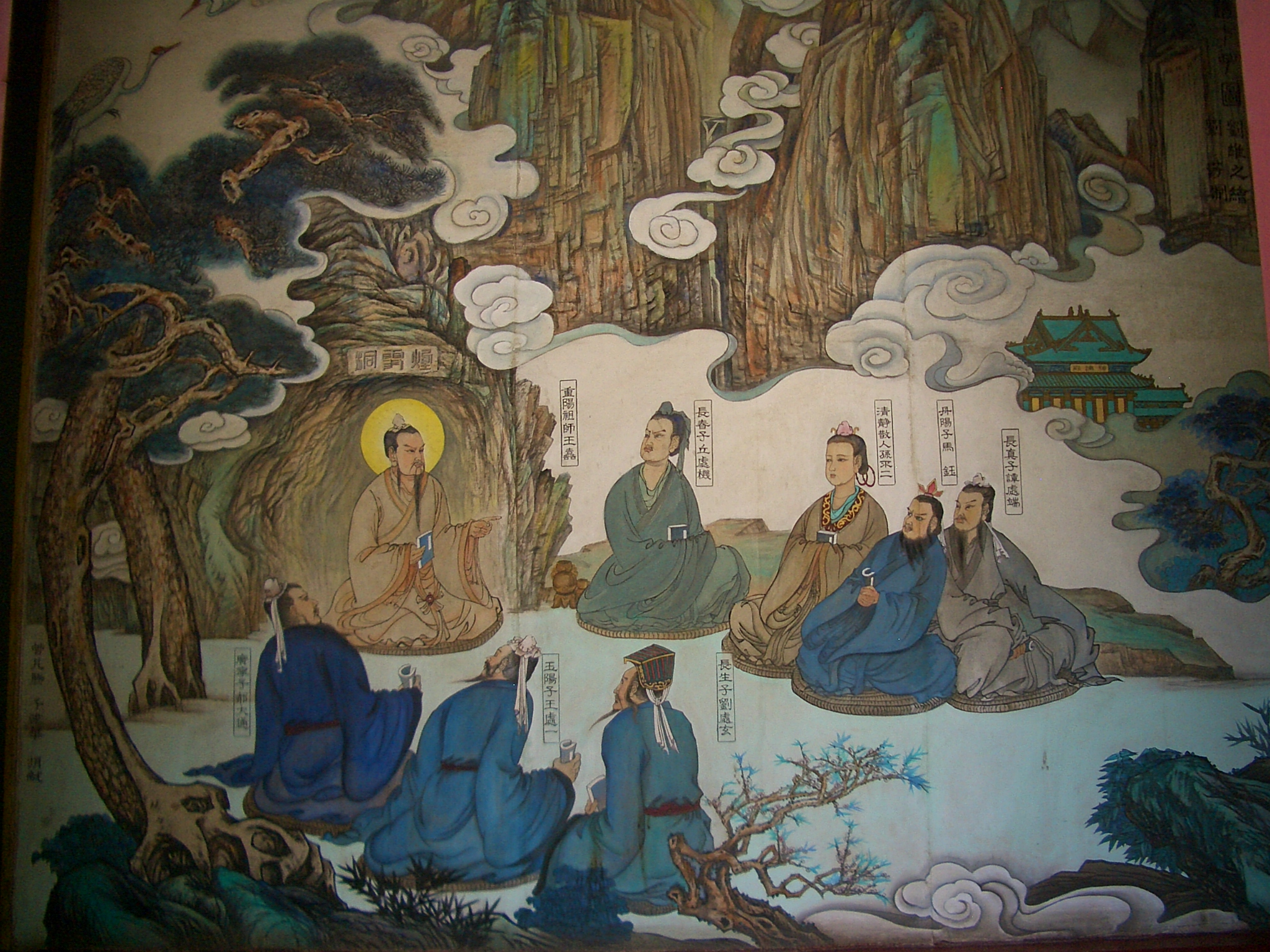
Wang Chongyang and his seven disciples, depicted in Changchun Temple, Wuhan

Wang Chongyang had many followers and devotees, but formally had seven major disciples which are collectively called the Seven Perfected （七真人 Qi Zhenren). Each one of them enstablished their own lineage:

1. Ma Yu (馬鈺) founded the Yuxian lineage (Meeting the Immortals)
2. Tan Chuduan (譚處端) founded the Nanwu lineage (Southern Void)
3. Liu Chuxuan (劉處玄) founded the Suishan lineage (Mount Sui)
4. Qiu Chuji (丘處機) founded the Longmen lineage (Dragon Gate)
5. Wang Chuyi (王處一) founded the Yushan lineage (Mount Yu)
6. Hao Datong (郝大通) founded the Huashan lineage (Mount Hua)
7. Sun Bu'er (孫不二) founded the Qingjing lineage (Clarity and Stillness)

Of these seven, four were closer to their master and cultivated together, they are: Ma, Qiu, Tan and Liu.

All of them had a profound role in spreading and consolidating the Quanzhen school, but the one that made a paramount contribution is Qiu Chuji, the founder of the Longmen school. Qiu Chuji was summoned by Genghis Khan which had just defeated the Jin dynasty in northern China, so Qiu travelled over ten thousand kilometers to the Hindu Kush. This travel is recorded in Travels to the West of Qiu Chang Chun. The secret history of the purpouse and implications of this journey have been released in modern times by Taoist master Wang Liping in "Perfected Changchun's Journey to the West: One word stops the killing". Qiu Chuji suggested Genghis Khan to enstablish the capital in Yanjing (modern day Beijing) and he founded the White Cloud Monastery in Beijing, which is still nowadays the headquarter of Taoism in China. Genghis Khan granted tax-exempt status to all Quanzhen schools, allowed the constructions of new temples and placed Qiu in charge of all religions in China.

== In fiction ==
=== Condor Trilogy ===
Wang Chongyang is mentioned by name in the wuxia novels The Legend of the Condor Heroes and The Return of the Condor Heroes by Jin Yong. He is long dead when the events of the novels take place and the details of his life are revealed by other characters, such as his junior Zhou Botong. Wang Chongyang, who was nicknamed "Central Divine" or "Divine Apex" (中神通), emerged as one of the top five martial artists in the wulin (martial artists' community) after a contest on Mount Hua. He also founded the Quanzhen Sect, a martial arts sect based on the real-life Quanzhen School of Taoism. After his death, his seven apprentices, collectively known as the "Seven Immortals of Quanzhen", lead the Quanzhen Sect to become a highly-regarded "orthodox" sect in the wulin.

In the second novel, the protagonists Yang Guo and Xiaolongnü discover more details about Wang's life in the Ancient Tomb in the Zhongnan Mountains, where the Quanzhen Sect is based. It is revealed that had a romantic relationship with Lin Chaoying, the founder of the Ancient Tomb Sect, which Xiaolongnü and Yang Guo are members of. Wang had lost to Lin in a contest and had to keep his promise to hand over possession of the tomb and lead a monastic life as a Taoist for the rest of his life.

=== Other appearances ===
In the manhua series Oriental Heroes by Hong Kong artist Wong Yuk-long, Wang Chongyang is noted as the creator of the 'Nine Solar Art'.
