= Bai Mudan =

Bai Mudan or Baimudan or White Peony (Chinese: 白牡丹) may refer to:

- Baimudan tea, white tea made from the Camellia sinensis plant
- Bai Mudan (mythology), character from Chinese mythology, lover of the Taoist immortal Lü Dongbin
- Bai Mudan (1900–1968), Peking opera actor later known as Xun Huisheng

== See also ==
- Peony
