= Fairy Cave (Jiujiang) =

Cave in Jiangxi, China

- Lushan Fairy Cave
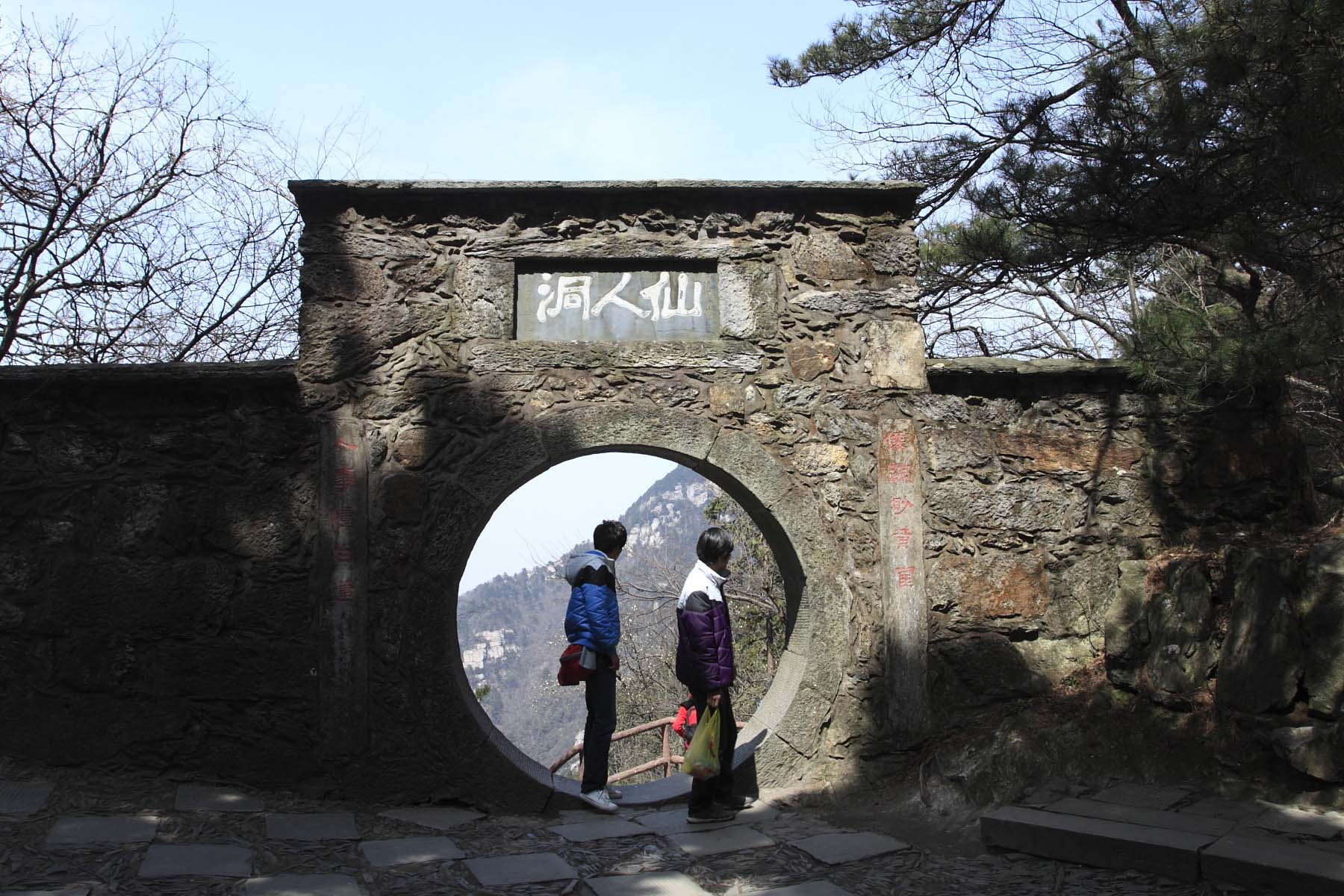
- Interactive map of Fairy Cave
- Location: Mount Lu, Jiangxi Province

The Fairy Cave (Chinese: 仙人洞), or Cave of the Immortals, also known as Lushan Fairy Cave, is a rock cave made of sand cliffs anciently called "Buddha's Hand Rock", located in Mount Lu, Jiujiang City, Jiangxi Province. It is a natural cave formed gradually by the continuous weathering of nature and the long-term washing of mountain water.

It is said that Lü Dongbin, a famous Taoist in the Tang dynasty, cultivated and refined in the cave until he became an immortal. Later generations changed the name of the Buddha's Hand Rock to "Fairy Cave" in order to worship Lü.

In 1961, Jiang Qing in Mount Lu took a photo of Fairy Cave, Mao Zedong was very satisfied after seeing it and wrote a poem.

== Images ==
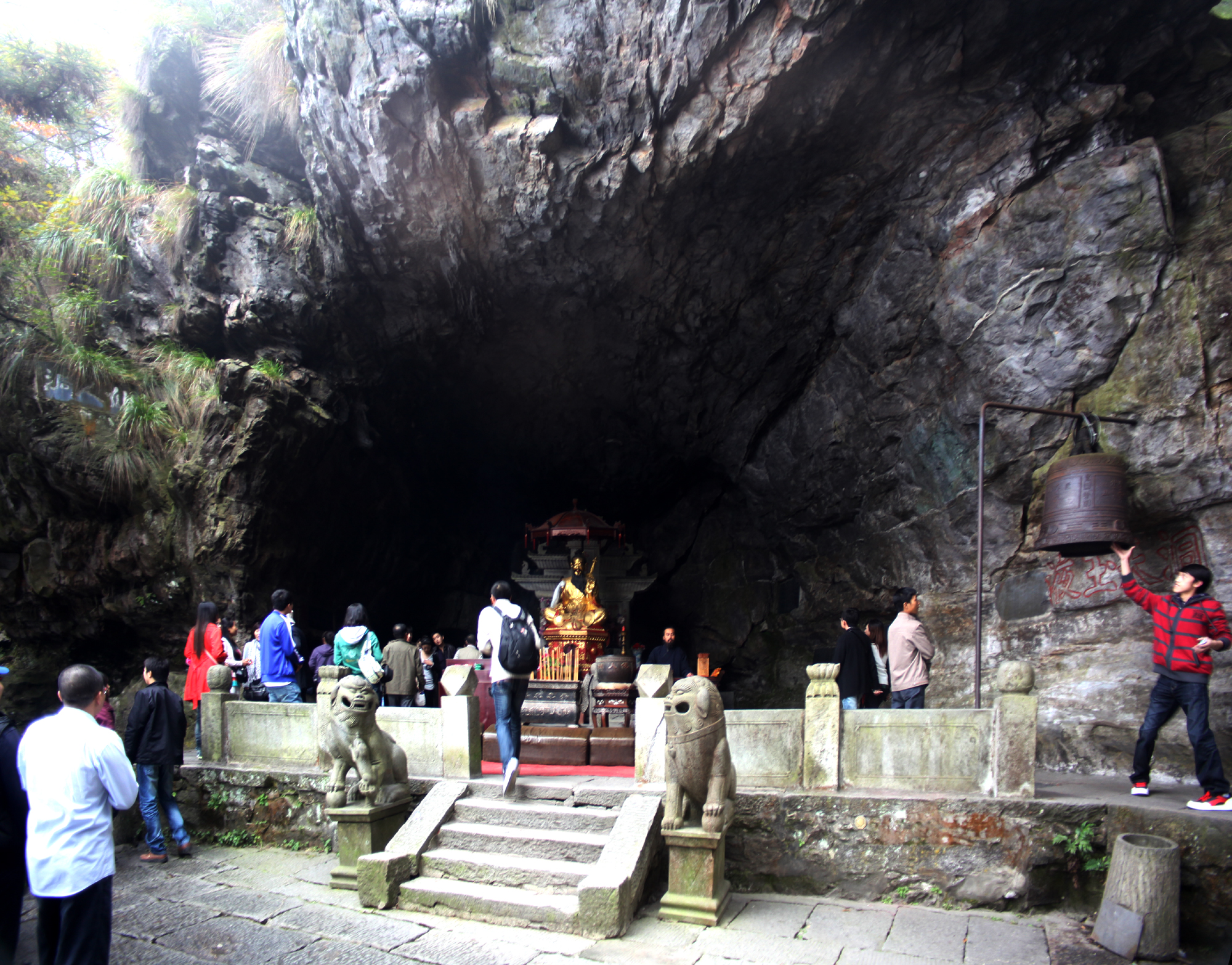
Entrance of Fairy Cave

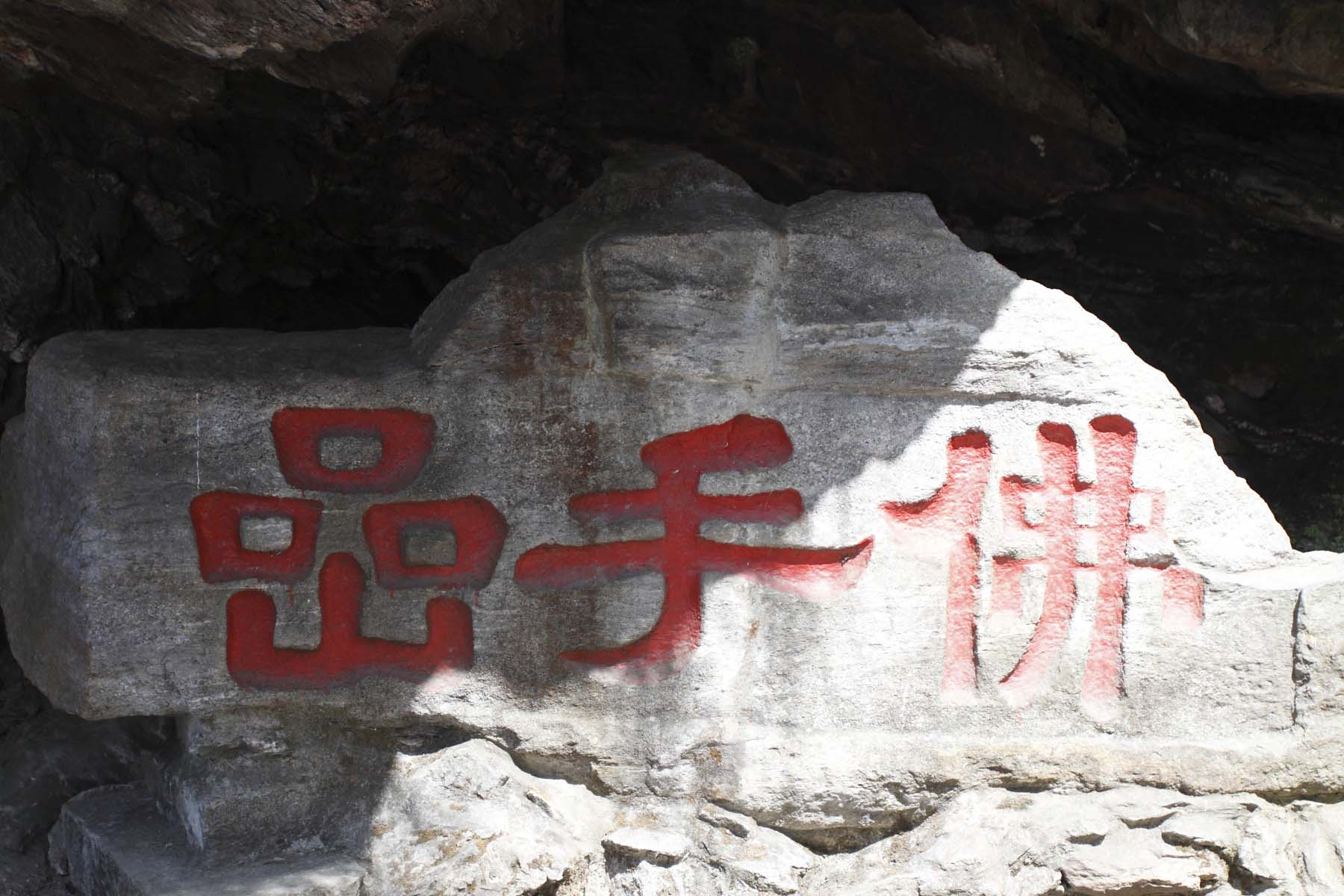
Buddha's Hand Rock

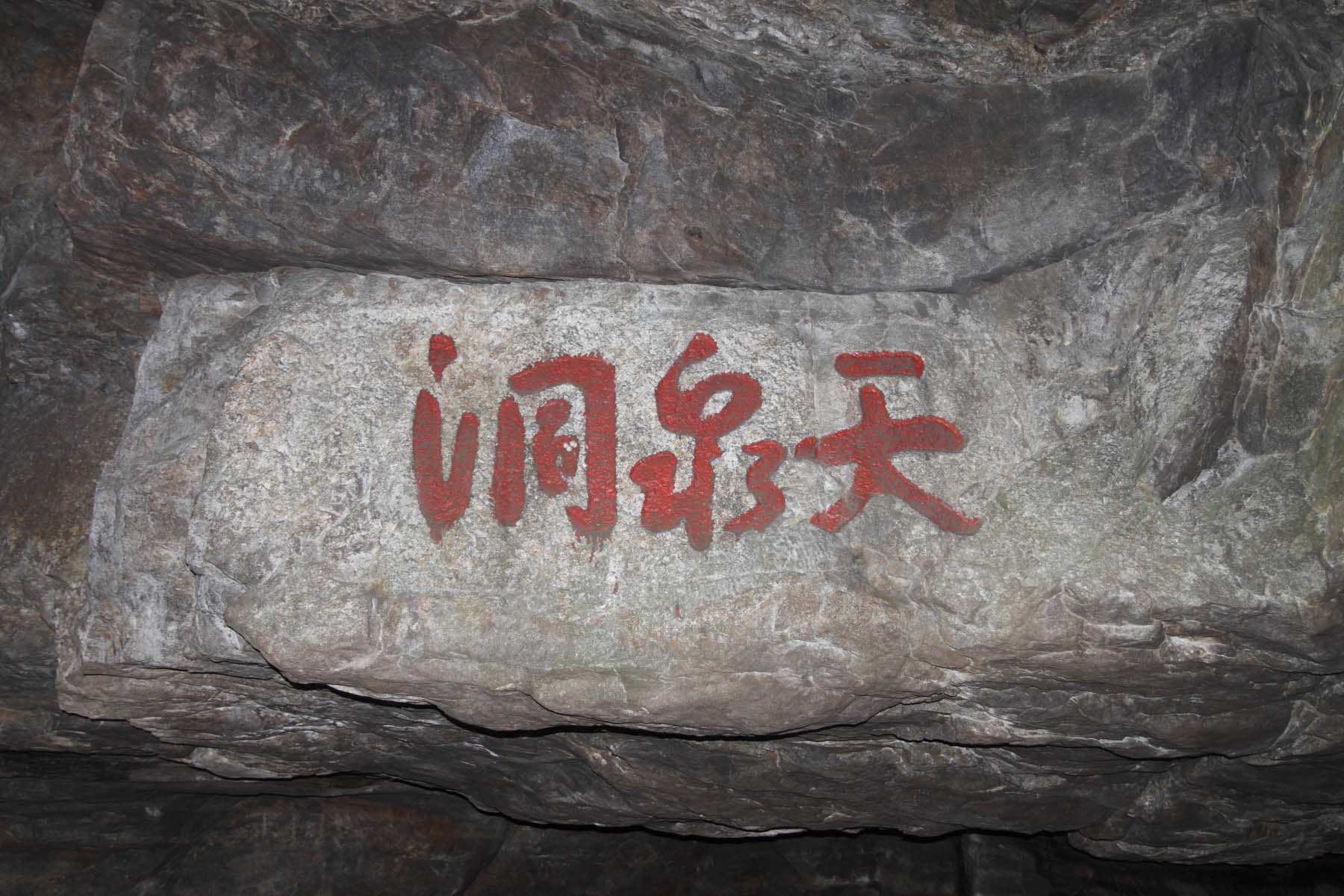
Tianquan Cave

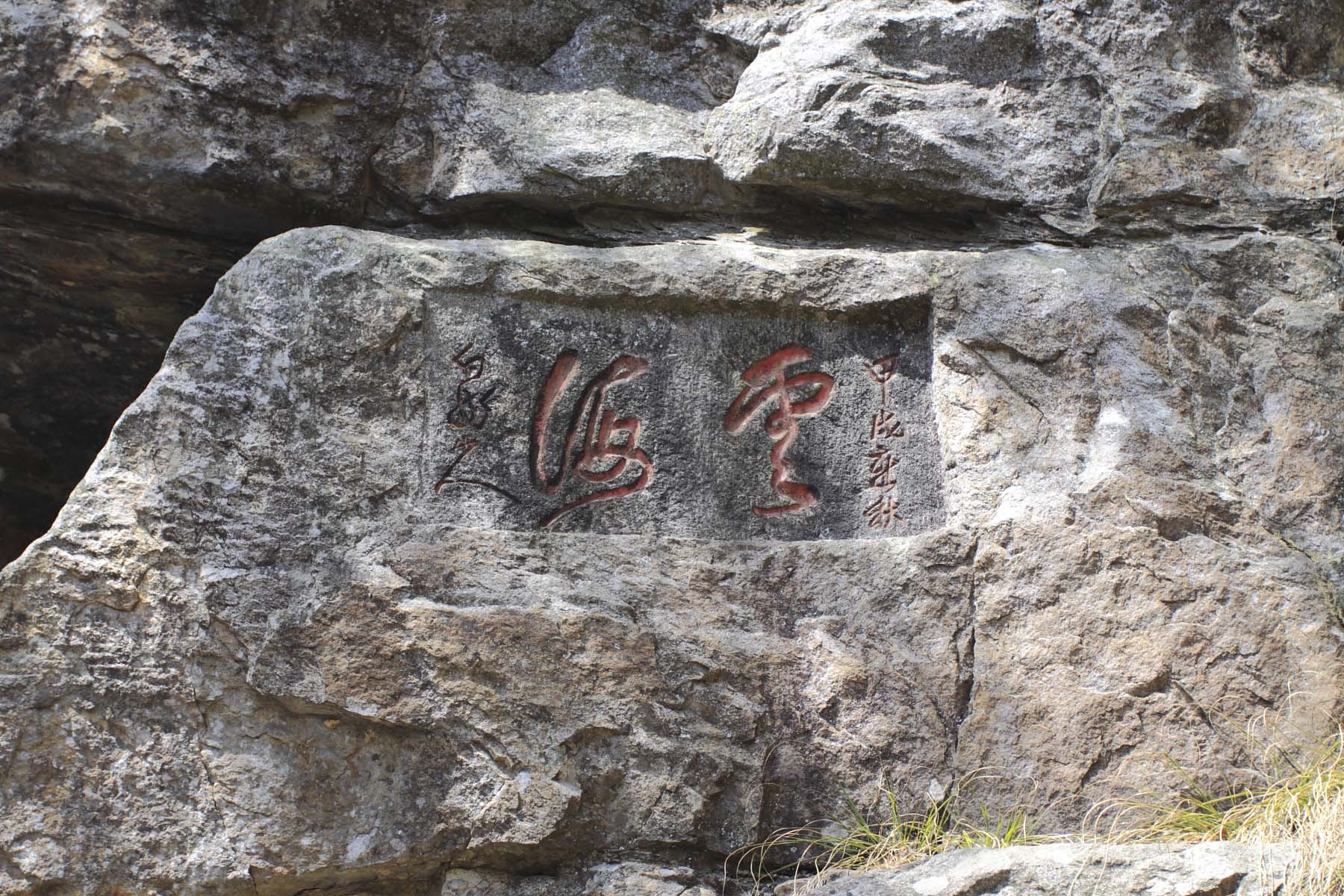
Yun Sea
