= Wang Xuanfu =

Taoist immortal

Wang Xuanfu (王玄甫), also known as Wang Cheng (王誠), was a legendary Taoist of the Han Dynasty, who is said to have become immortal at the age of 256, under the name of "Lord of the Young Yang of the Purple Office" (紫府少陽君). He is sometimes equated with the god Donghua (東華帝君), in which case he is made a character of the Zhou dynasty. Considered the master of Zhongli Quan, to whom he would have transmitted alchemical secrets and the Azure Dragon Sword Technique (青龍劍法), he is one of the Quanzhen school's Five Ancestors of the North and was titled by the Yuan emperors.

He is said to be from Donghai (東海), now Yanzhou in Shandong. As a disciple of the Immortal of the White Clouds (白雲上真), he was said to have been a hermit in the magical caves of the Kunlun, Wutai, and Zhongnan Mountains, the latter frequented by the apparitions of Wang Chongyang, the founder of the Quanzhen school. He is sometimes depicted as a wandering vindicator carrying a pair of flying swords on his back that can accomplish their mission on their own and then return to their scabbard. His divine birthday is on the 15th day of the 6th month, and is achievement of immortality is said to be on the 16th day of the 10th month.
