= Bai Mudan (mythology) =

Character in Chinese mythology

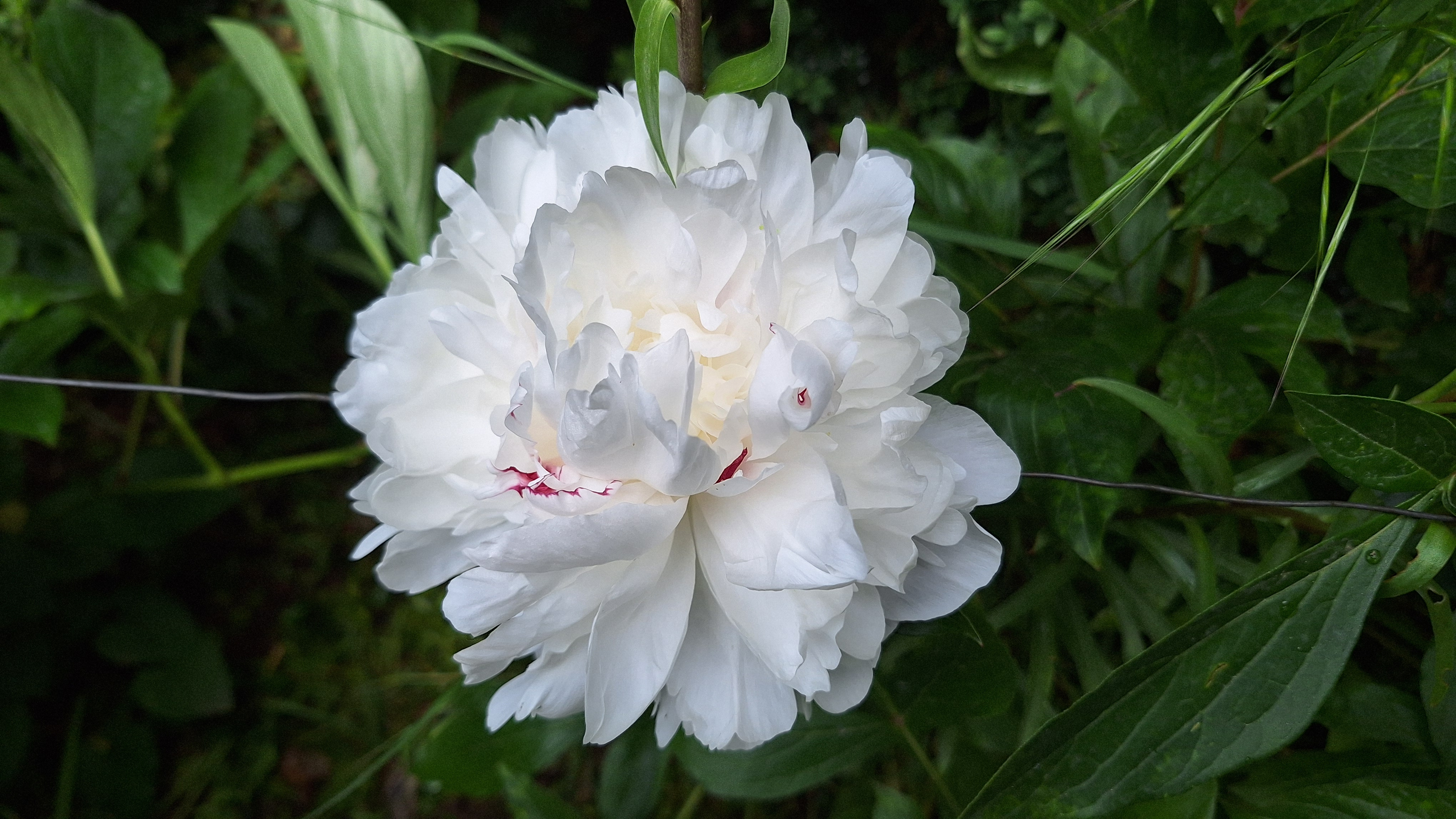
Close up of white peony flower that the character was named for.

Bai Mudan (白牡丹; literally White Peony), also romanized as Pai Mu-tan, is a character from Chinese mythology. She is described as the most beautiful courtesan in the city of Luoyang and a reincarnation of the Peony fairy.

== Legends ==
One of White Peony's legends comes from the novel Journey to the East. It is said that one day, the immortal Lü Dongbin took a walk in Luoyang spotted White Peony, and was attracted to her beauty. Lü Dongbin then transformed himself into a handsome scholar and slept with her many times. However, in accordance with Taoist alchemy, he never ejaculated, in order to preserve his Yang essence. Unfortunately, Lu's immortal colleague Iron-Crutch Li and He Xiangu taught Mudan how to make him ejaculate by tickling his groin. Finally, White Peony successfully made Lü Dongbin ejaculate and absorbed his Yang essence. Later she cultivated herself and became immortal as well.

Feijianji, another novel from the Ming Dynasty had a slightly different version of this legend. According to Feijianji, Bai Mudan was a common girl (not a courtesan) who was seduced by Lü Dongbin. Later she became very weak since Lu practiced "cai yin bu yang" on her, meaning he absorbed her yin (female) essence, without losing his own yang (male) essence. When Bai's mother consulted with Buddhist Monk Huanglong (Yellow Dragon), he taught her how to make Lü Dongbin ejaculate and thus restore her yin essence. This event enraged Lü Dongbin, he tried to decapitate Huanglong using his flying sword but failed. In the end Lu admitted his mistakes and acknowledged Huanglong as his teacher.

In another story White Peony was ordered by the minister Su Shi (Su Dongpo), to tempt his friend, monk Fo Yin.

Some legends described Bai Mudan as a haughty courtesan who liked to humiliate her clients. She even asked the greedy merchant Chen Hua to kiss her buttocks and lick her anus, and farted into his mouth, an allusion for Chen Hua's constant flattery. The Chinese idiom for flattery is duo tun peng pi 掇臀捧屁 (hug the butt and praise the fart)

== As goddess ==
Bai Mudan was deified as a goddess who tempts men or more specifically an ascetic due to her reputation as a seducer.

== In popular culture ==
- White Peony appeared in classic novels such as Journey to the East (東遊記), Ba Xian Dedao (八仙得道), Fei Jian Ji, and Han Xiangzi Quanzhuan-The Story of Han Xiangzi: The Alchemical Adventures of a Daoist Immortal (韓湘子全傳).
- She is also a protagonist in the opera Lü Dongbin san xi Bai Mudan (Lü Dongbin three trick on White Peony). However, in some opera versions White Peony is depicted as an apothecary's daughter instead of courtesan.
- Movies have been based on the opera.
- White Peony appeared in many television series such as Dong You Ji (portrayed by Phyllis Quek), Eight Avatar (portrayed by Sonija Kwok), Baxian Guohai (ATV-1985) portrayed by Ban Ban, and Ghost Catcher Legend of Beauties (portrayed by Liu Yihan). She also appeared in the 1971 movie Eight Immortals, portrayed by Chang Chi-Yu.
