= Zhongnan Mountains =

Mountain range in Shaanxi, China

Coordinates: 33.933°N 108.999°E

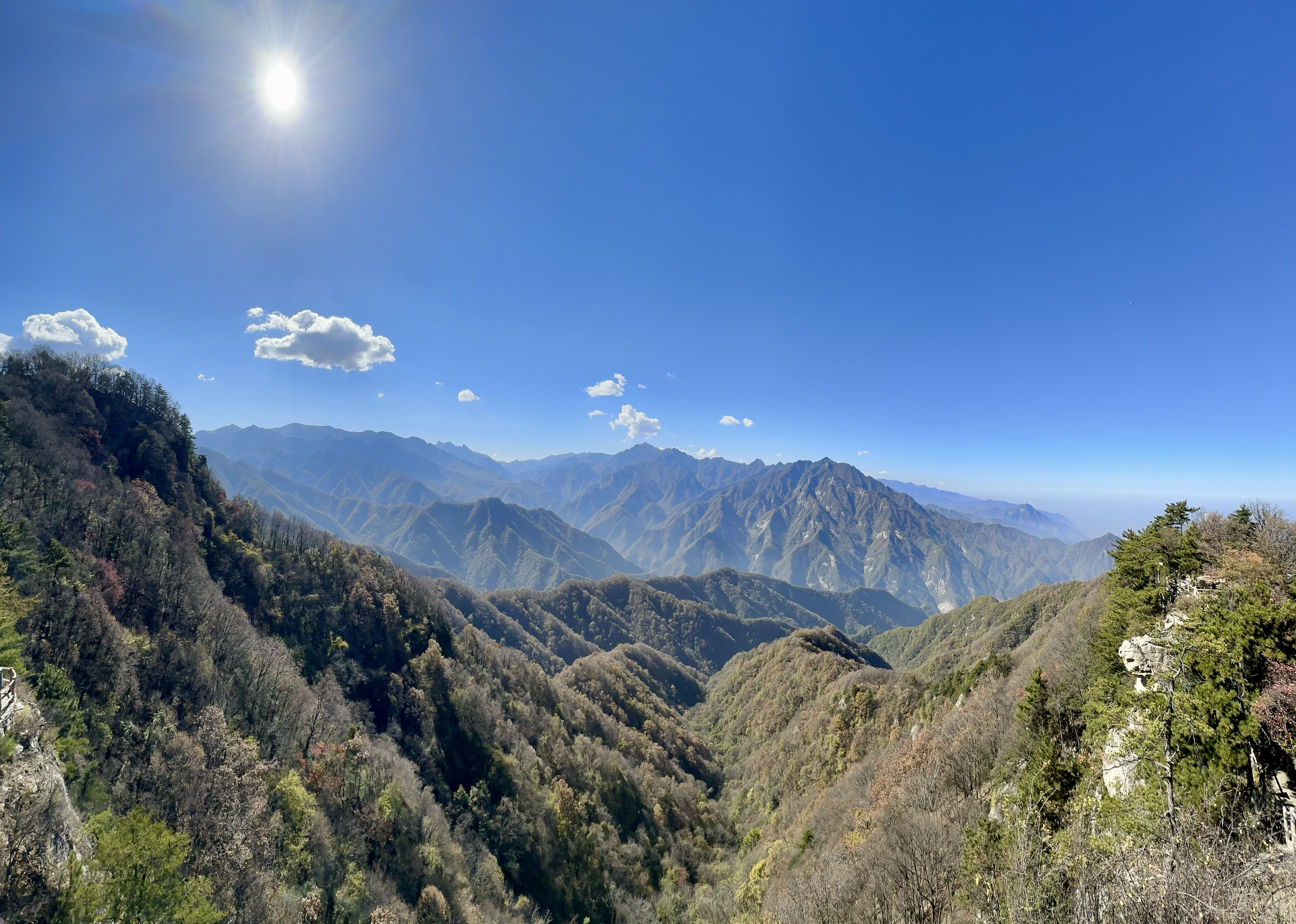
South View of Qinling from Crouching Tiger Mountain Peak

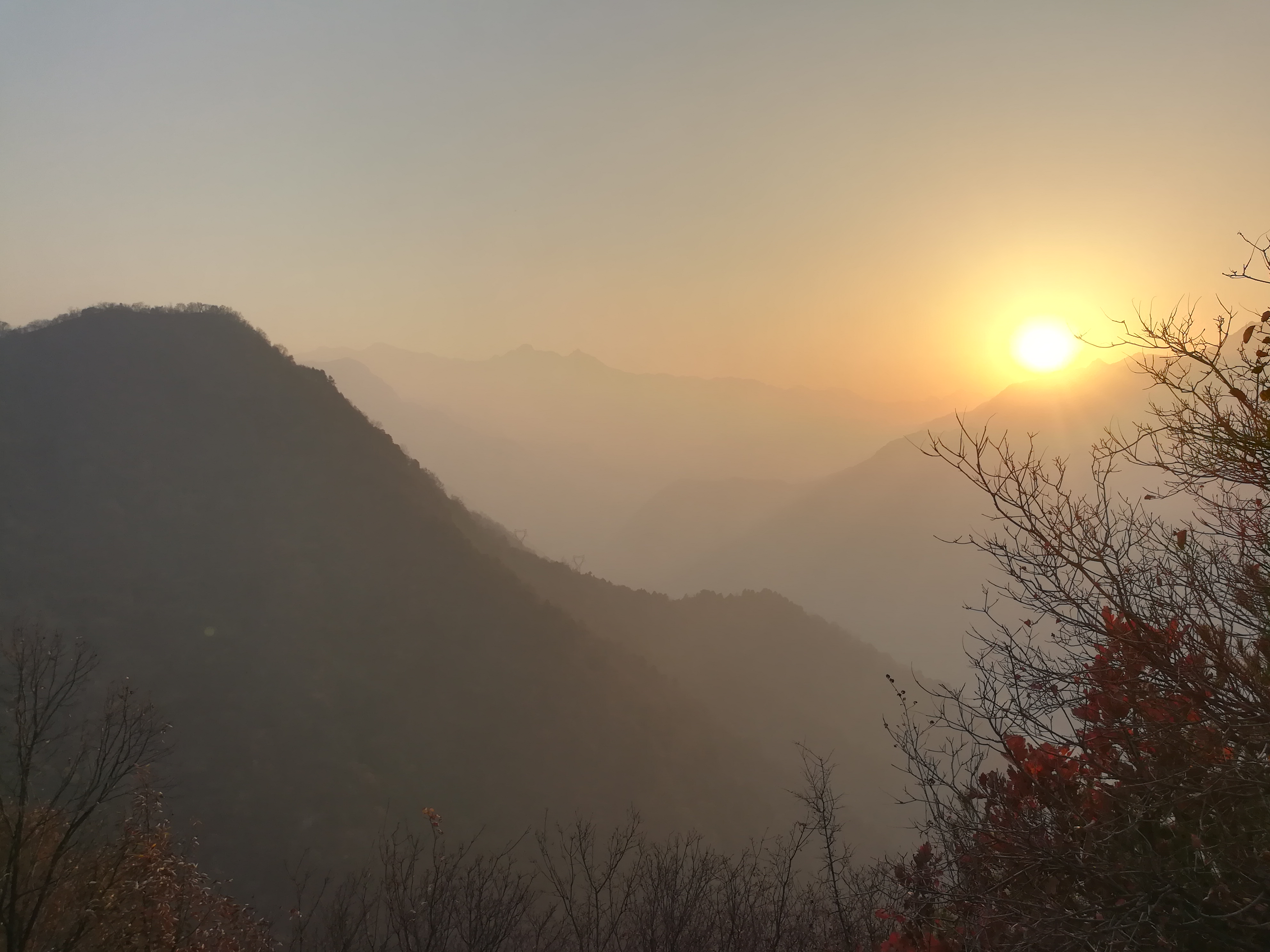
Zhongnan Mountains

The Zhongnan Mountains (simplified Chinese: 终南山; traditional Chinese: 終南山; pinyin: Zhōngnánshān), sometimes called the Taiyi Mountains (太乙山; Taìyǐ Shān) or Zhounan Mountains (周南山; Zhōunán Shān), are a branch of the Qin Mountains located in Shaanxi Province, south of Xi'an, China that extend from Wugong County in the east of the province to Lantian County. At 2,604 metres (8,543 ft), the range's highest point is Cuihua Mountain. Other notable peaks and places in the Zhongnan Mountains include Lou Guan Tai, where Taoist sage Laozi is said to have dwelt and conveyed the Dao De Jing. Later this was also a place of dwelling for Nan Wutai (南五台; 南五臺; Nán Wǔtái) and Guifeng.

The Zhongnan Mountains have been a popular dwelling place for Daoist hermits since at least the Qin dynasty. Buddhist monks began living in the mountains after Buddhism's introduction into China from India in the early first millennium AD. The Quanzhen School, one of the largest branches of modern Taoism, was founded in the Zhongnan Mountains by Song dynasty Taoist Wang Chongyang. Due to the mountains' close proximity to the ancient capital of Chang'an, officials who incurred the imperial court's wrath often fled to these mountains to escape punishment.

The Chinese folkloric deity Zhong Kui is said to have grown up in those same mountains. Other than the name, the context of Zhong Kui being a protection deity related to Taoist belief can be connected with the creation of the Quanzhong Sect.

== See also ==
- Qin Mountains
- Wang Wei
