= Zhongli Quan =

One of the Eight Taoist Immortals

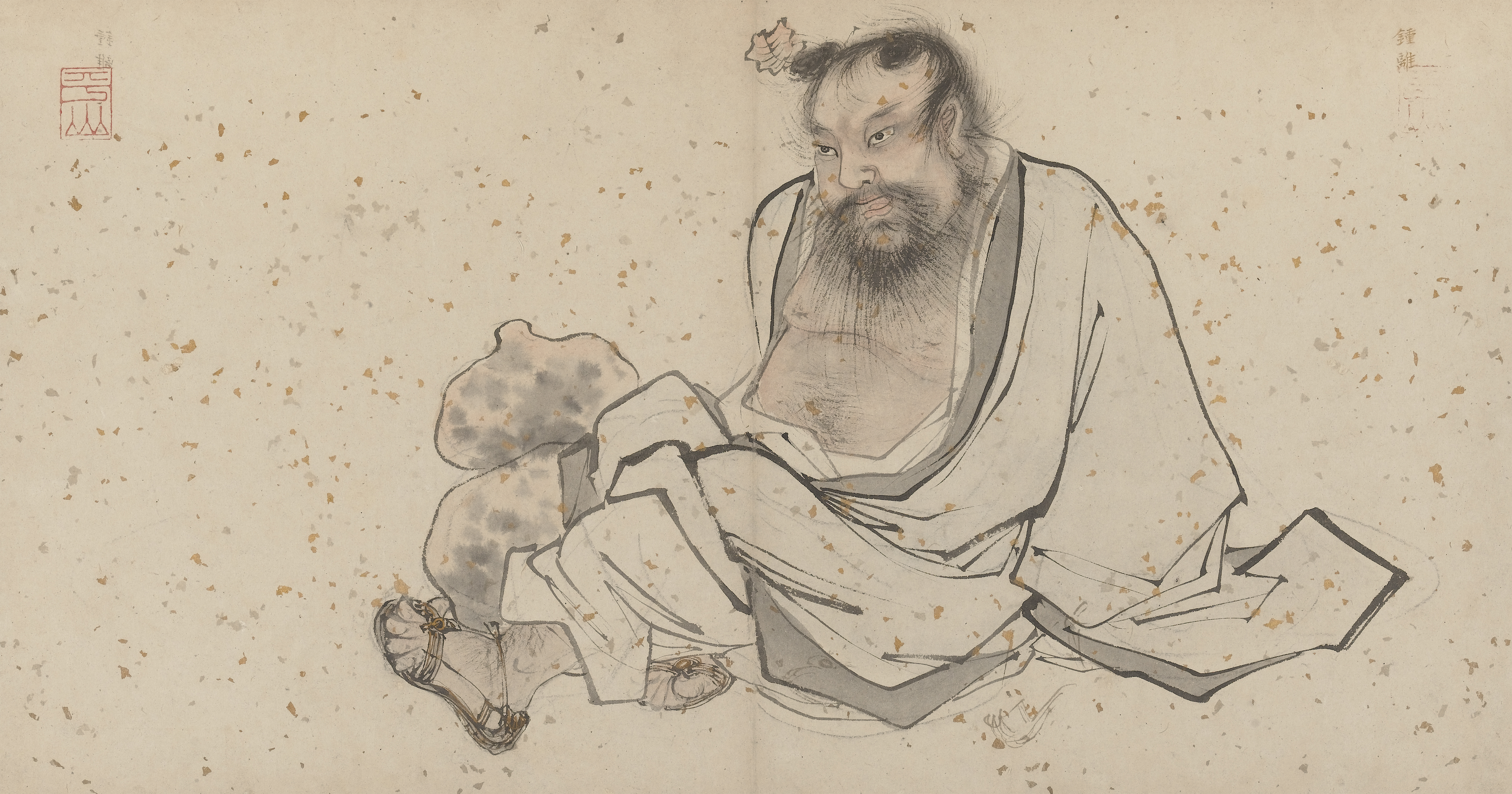
- Zhang Lu's painting of Zhongli Quan, early 16th century
- Traditional Chinese: 鍾離權
- Simplified Chinese: 锺离权
Transcriptions
Standard Mandarin
- Hanyu Pinyin: Zhōnglí Quán
- Wade–Giles: Chung-li Chüan
Yue: Cantonese
- Yale Romanization: Jūng Lèih Kyùhn
- Jyutping: Zung1 Lei4 Kyun4

Alternative Chinese name
- Chinese: 寂道
Transcriptions
Standard Mandarin
- Hanyu Pinyin: Jìdào
- Wade–Giles: Chi-tao
Yue: Cantonese
- Yale Romanization: Jihk Douh
- Jyutping: Zik6 Dou6

Second alternative Chinese name
- Traditional Chinese: 漢鍾離
- Simplified Chinese: 汉锺离
Transcriptions
Standard Mandarin
- Hanyu Pinyin: Hàn Zhōnglí
- Wade–Giles: Han Chung-Li
Yue: Cantonese
- Yale Romanization: Hon Jūng Lèih
- Jyutping: Hon3 Zung1 Lei4

Zhongli Quan, courtesy name Jidao, is a Chinese mythological figure and one of the Eight Immortals in the Taoist pantheon. He is also known as Han Zhongli because he was said to have been born in the Han dynasty. In legend, he holds a peach and wields a large feather fan which can resurrect the dead and transform stones into silver or gold.

== Life ==
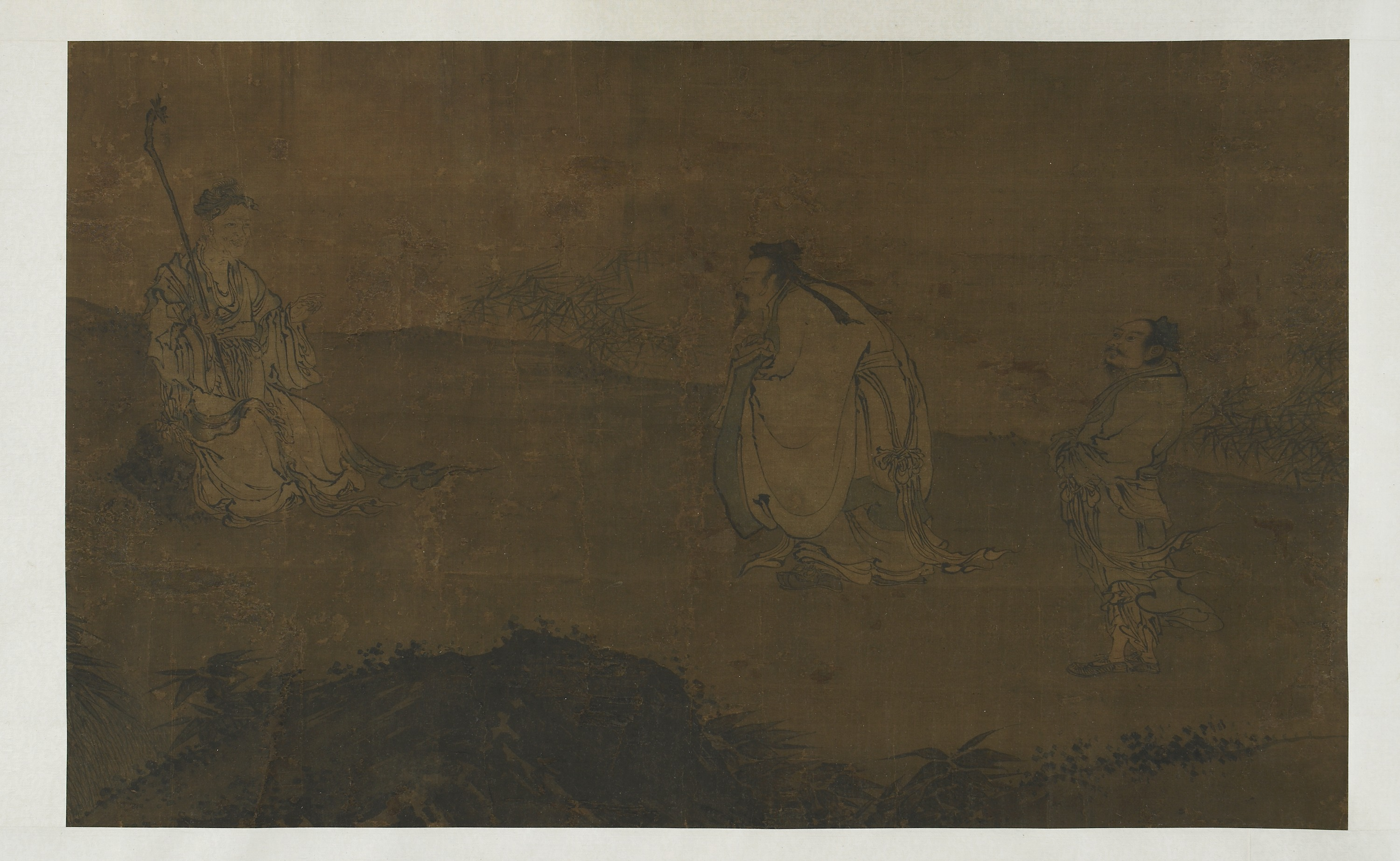
The painting Zhongli Quan Seeking the Dao, 15th century

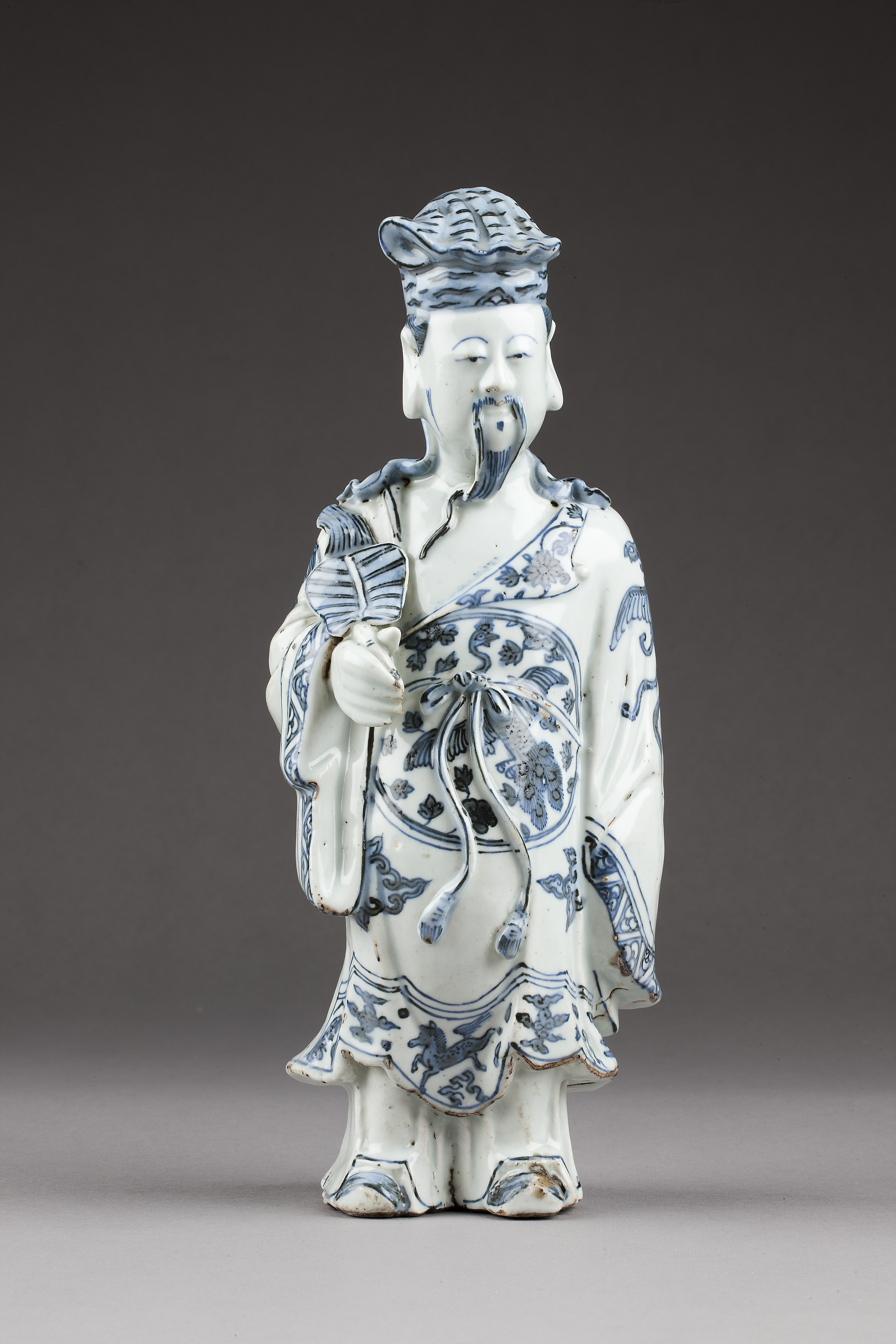
Porcelain figure of Zhongli Quan decorated in underglaze cobalt blue, Wanli period (1573–1620), Ming dynasty, Hallwyl Museum, Sweden

Zhongli was born in Yanjing. According to legend, bright beams of light filled the labour room during his birth. After he was born, he did not stop crying until seven full days had passed. He was destined for greatness from the day he was born by showing features such as a broad forehead, thick ears, long eyebrows, deep eyes, red nose, square mouth, high cheeks, and scarlet lips. Stories depict that either seven days or seven years later, he began to speak, and the first sentence he uttered was, "my feet have wandered in the purple palace of the [immortals], my name is recorded in the capital of the jade emperor." Later Taoists celebrate his birthday on the fifteenth day of the fourth month of the Chinese calendar. Following his father's example, he became a member of the court, advancing to be general of one of the armies of the Han dynasty. During his time as a general, his army fought against Tibet. In his last battle he was beaten by the Tibetans, forcing him to flee into the mountainous areas surrounding him. There he came across an old man who led him to a spiritual sanctuary where he was welcomed in and told that he could stay as long as was needed. There he learned the ways of the immortal rituals and extensive amounts of alchemy. After three hard days of teaching, he was dismissed and told to use his newfound powers to serve his people. When he turned back to talk to the man, he and his home had vanished. Using his power of alchemy and his magical fan, he created silver and gold coins from stones and saved people from poverty and famine.

There are two stories that depict how he became one of the immortals. In the first, it was in his continuous use of the immortal powers and his magical fan that eventually caused his descent into the shimmering cloud of the immortals. In the second, he was meditating near a wall of his hermitage when all of a sudden it collapsed. Behind the wall was a jade vessel that took him as an immortal to the shimmering cloud.

In Taoism, he is known as "Zhengyang Zushi" (simplified Chinese: 正阳祖师; traditional Chinese: 正陽祖師; pinyin: Zhèngyáng Zǔshī), literally "True-Yang Ancestor-Master". He is also called "Master of the Cloud-Chamber" (simplified Chinese: 云房先生; traditional Chinese: 雲房先生; pinyin: Yúnfáng Xiānshēng) in accounts describing his encounter with Lü Dongbin before achieving immortality.

== Depiction ==
Usually depicted with his chest and belly bare and holding a fan made of feathers or horse hair, Zhongli is often set apart from the other immortals in pictures by wisps of hair on his temples and a beard down to his navel. He is known for his pleasing disposition, and is often painted or drawn drinking wine.

He is regularly venerated as the "patron of silversmiths".

== Modern depiction ==
In the television show Jackie Chan Adventures, Zhongli was eventually revealed to be the Immortal who sealed away Xiao Fung, The Wind Demon, even though he was initially depicted as having sealed away Dai Gui, The Earth Demon.
