= Lü Dongbin =

Chinese scholar and poet

Lü Dongbin 呂洞賓
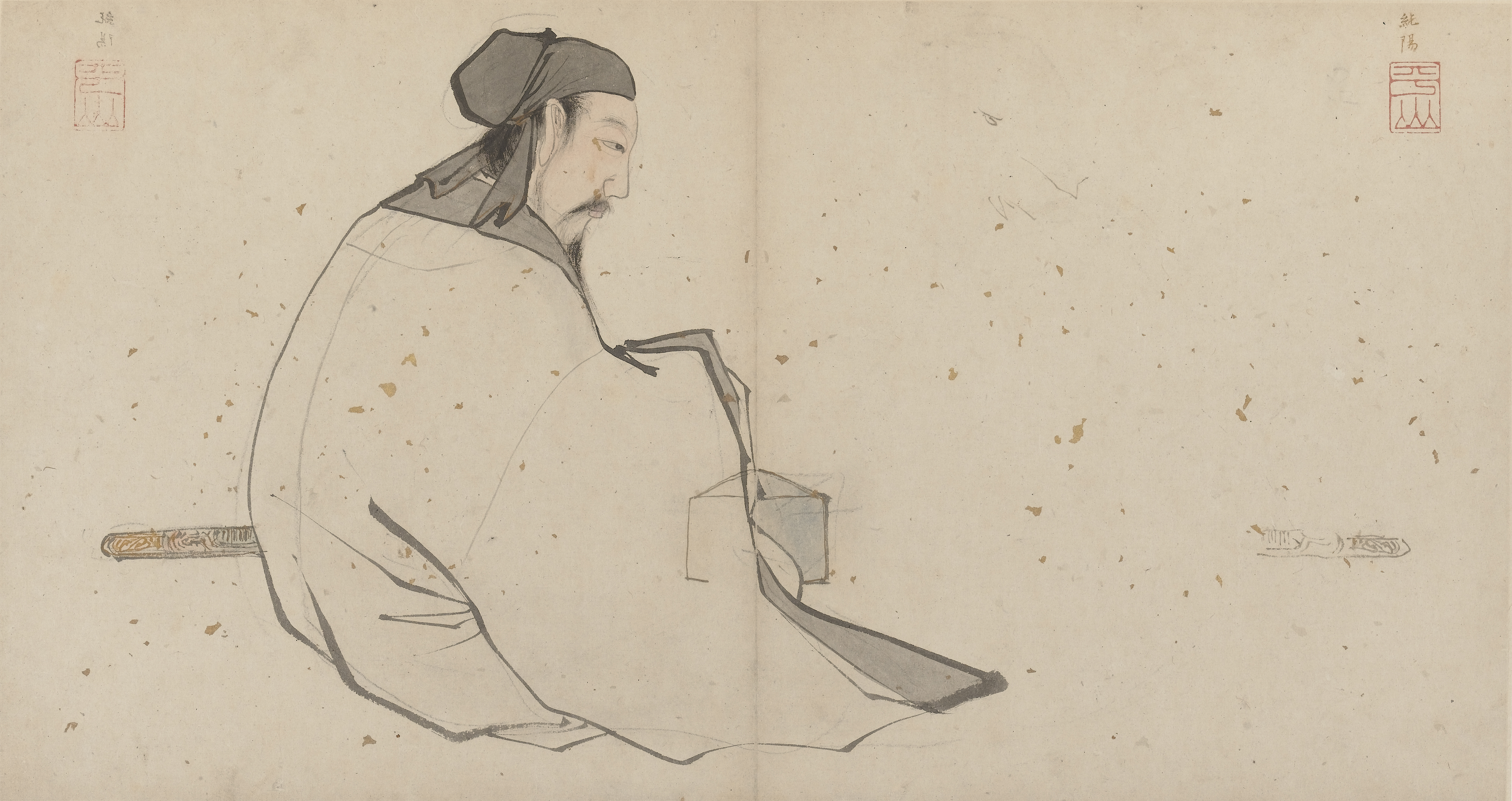
- Zhang Lu's painting of Lü Dongbin, early 16th century
- Traditional Chinese: 呂洞賓
- Simplified Chinese: 吕洞宾
Transcriptions
Standard Mandarin
- Hanyu Pinyin: Lǚ Dòngbīn
- Wade–Giles: Lü^{3} Tung^{4}-Pin^{1}
- IPA: [lỳ tʊ̂ŋ.pín]
Yue: Cantonese
- Yale Romanization: Léuih Duhng Bān
- Jyutping: Leoi^{5} Dung^{6} Ban^{1}

Lü Dongbin was a Daoist scholar and poet who lived during the Tang dynasty in China, and whose lifetime supposedly spanned two hundred and twenty years. Elevated to the status of an immortal in the Chinese cultural sphere by Daoists, he is one of the most widely known of the group of deities known as the Eight Immortals. Lü is also a historical figure and mentioned in the official history book History of Song. He is widely considered to be one of the earliest masters of neidan, or internal alchemy. He is also depicted in art dressed as a scholar carrying a sword to dispel evil spirits.

== Character ==
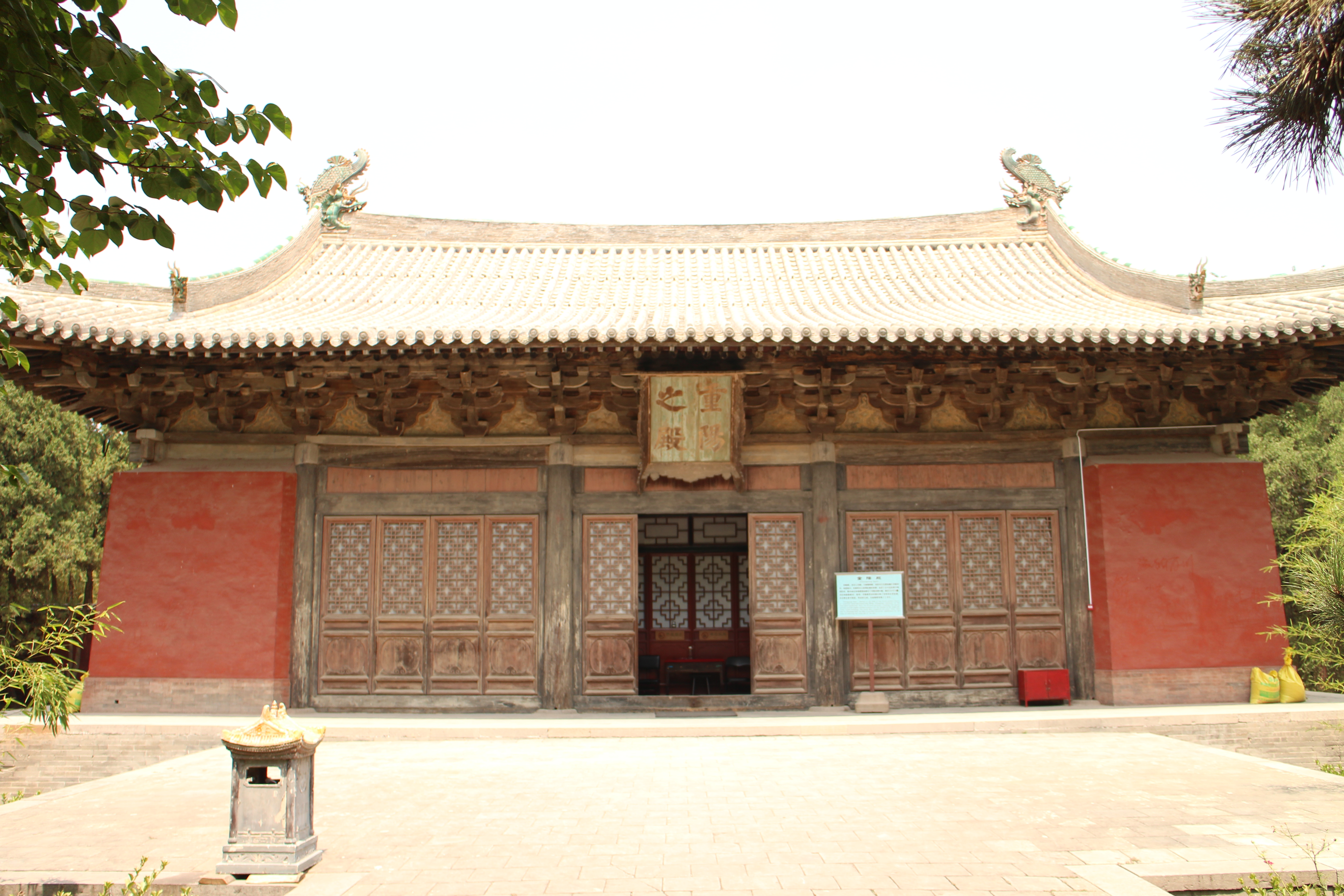
Yongle Gong, the main shrine to Lü and his burial place

Lü Dongbin is usually portrayed as a scholarly, clever man with a genuine desire to help people obtain wisdom/enlightenment and to learn the Tao. However, he is often portrayed as having some character "flaws," not an uncommon theme for the colorful Taoist immortals, all of whom in general have various eccentricities:

- He is portrayed as having bouts of drunkenness, which was not uncommon among the often fun-loving Eight Immortals. This also parallels several Taoist artists renowned for their love of drinking.
- One story relates that early on after becoming immortal, he had a strong temper as a "young" immortal, even deforming a riverbank in a bout of anger.
- He is said to be a ladies man, even after (or only after) becoming an immortal – and for this reason he is generally not invoked by people with romantic problems. This may also relate to some of the Taoist sexual arts.
- Lü was also a prolific poet. His works were collected in the Quan Tangshi (Complete Tang poetry).

== Early life ==
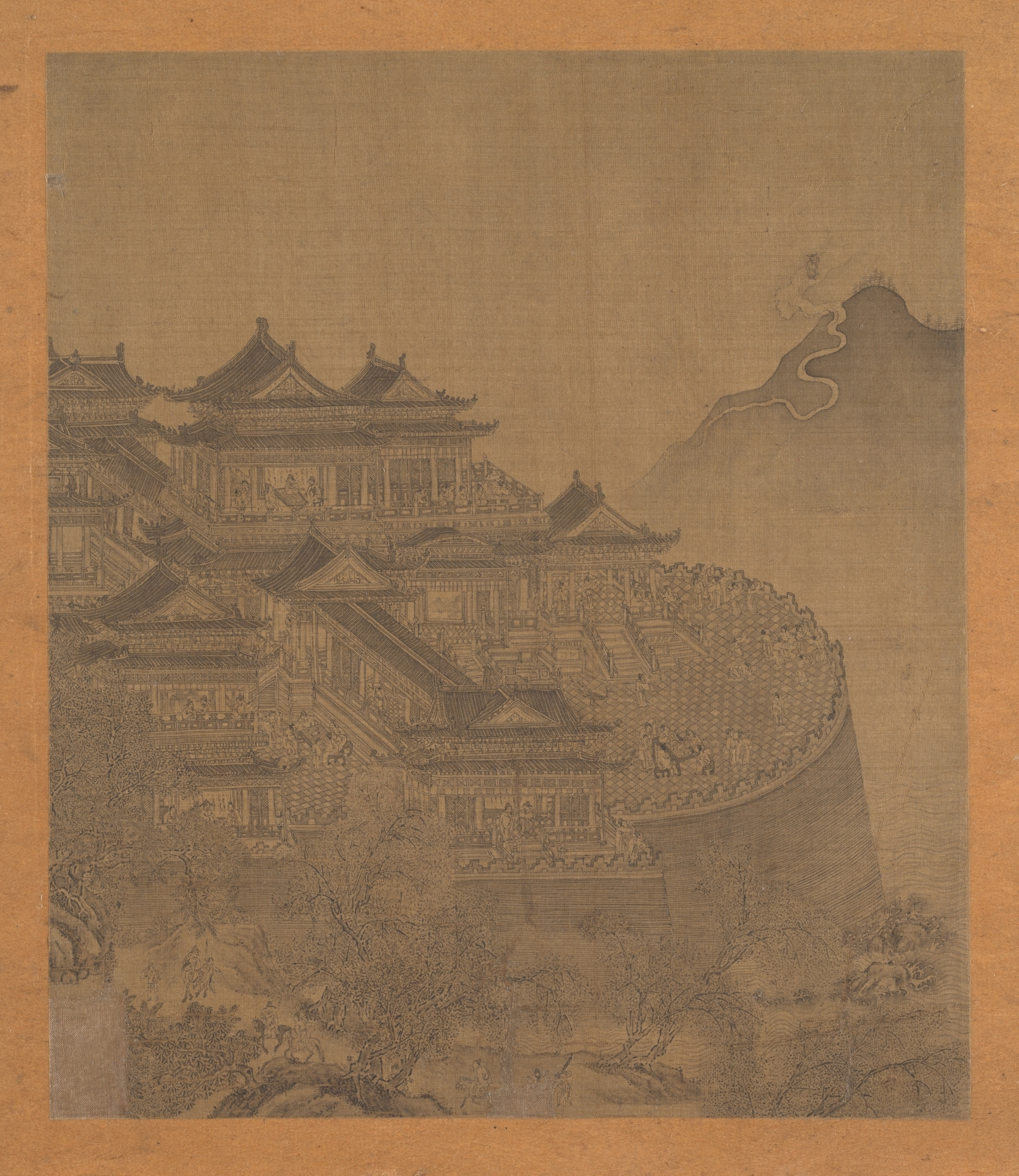
The Immortal Lü Dongbin Appearing over the Yueyang Pavilion, Yuan dynasty.

His name is Lü Yán, with Yán (巖 or 岩 or 喦) being the given name. Dòngbīn is his courtesy name. He is called "Master Pure-Yang" (純陽子; Chunyang Zi), and is also called "Lü the Progenitor" (呂祖; lü zŭ) by some Daoists, especially those of the Quanzhen School. He was born in Jingzhao Prefecture (京兆府) around 796 CE during the Tang dynasty. His birthday is said to be the 14th day of the fourth month of the Chinese calendar.

When he was born, a fragrance allegedly filled the room. He had been very intelligent since childhood and had many academic achievements. However, according to one story, still unmarried by the age of 20, Lü twice took the top-level civil service exam to become a government official, but did not succeed.

In the first year of Tang Baoli (825 CE), he was a scholar for a period of time. He served as a county magistrate twice. Soon he was ruined by officialdom, abandoned his official position and retired to the mountains. Once he went to a Chang'an wine store, met the real Zhongli Quan (鍾離權), passed ten trials, and Quan taught him the way to create the Golden pill; consequently he learned the way and became an immortal.

== Yellow Millet Dream ==
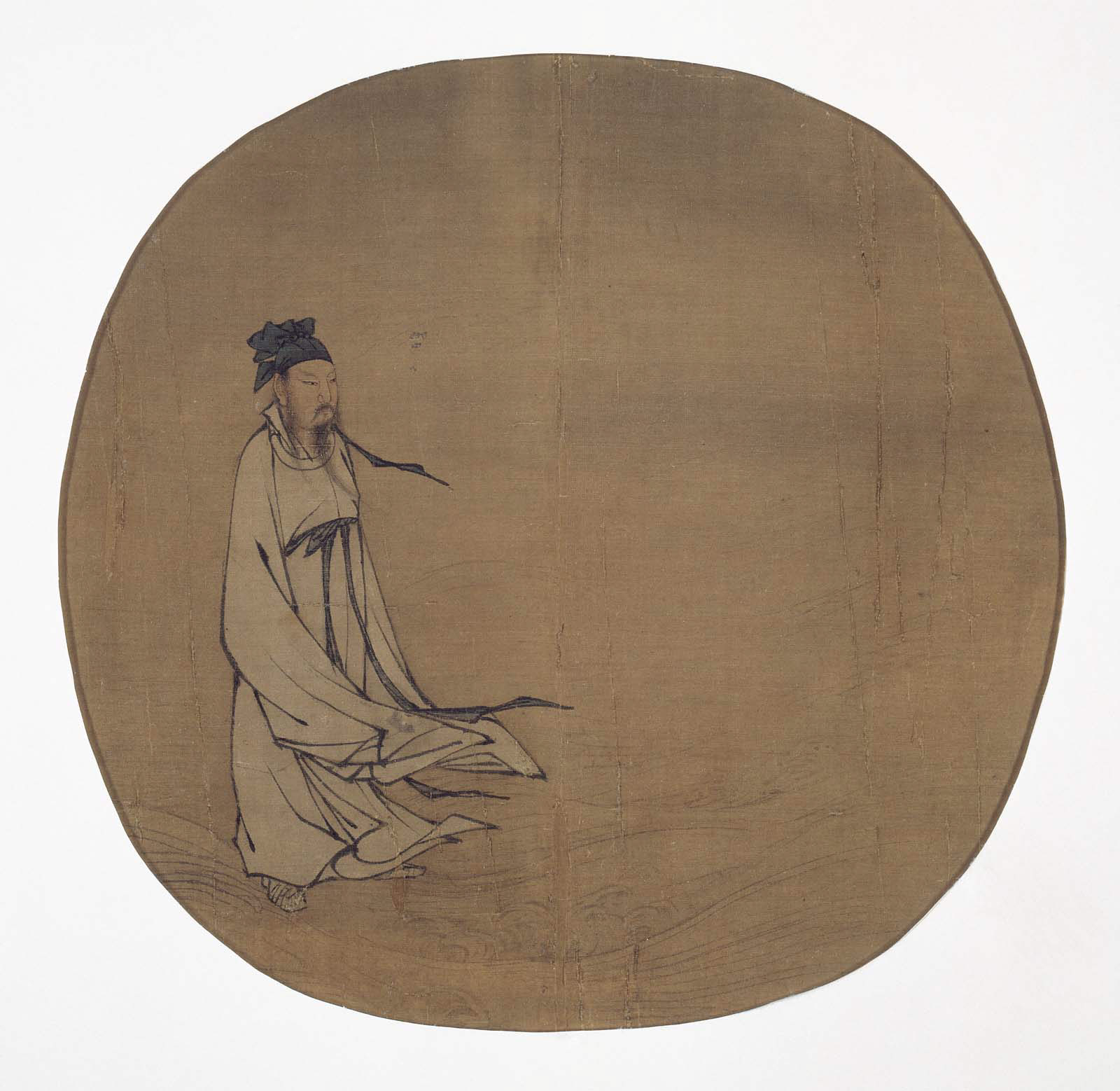
The Daoist immortal Lü Dongbin crossing Lake Dongting, dated to the Song dynasty

Legend has it that one night when Lü Yan was in Chang'an or Handan, he dozed off as his yellow millet was cooking in a hotel. He dreamed that he took the imperial exam and excelled, and thus was awarded a prestigious office and soon promoted to the position of vice minister (侍郎; shìláng). He then married the daughter of a prosperous household and had a son and a daughter. He was promoted again and again, and finally became the prime minister. However, his success and luck attracted jealousy of others, so he was accused of crimes that caused him to lose his office. His wife then betrayed him, his children were killed by bandits, and he lost all his wealth. As he was dying on the street in the dream, he woke up.

Although in the dream, eighteen years had passed, the whole dream actually happened in the time it took his millet to cook. The characters from his dream were actually played by Zhongli Quan in order to make him realize that one should not put too much importance on transient glory and success. As a result, Lü went with Zhongli to discover and cultivate the Tao. This dream is known as "Dream of the Yellow Millet" (黃粱夢; Huáng Liáng Mèng) and is described in a writing compiled by Ma Zhiyuan of the Yuan dynasty.

In volume 82 of Song dynasty scholar Li Fang's Extensive Records of the Taiping Era, an earlier version of the story, Lü Dongbin was replaced by Student Lu (盧生; Lú Shēng), and Zhongli Quan by Elder Lü (呂翁; Lǚ Wēng).

The exact age of Lü Yan when this incident occurred varies in the tellings, from 20 years of age to 40.

== Ten trials of Lü Dongbin ==
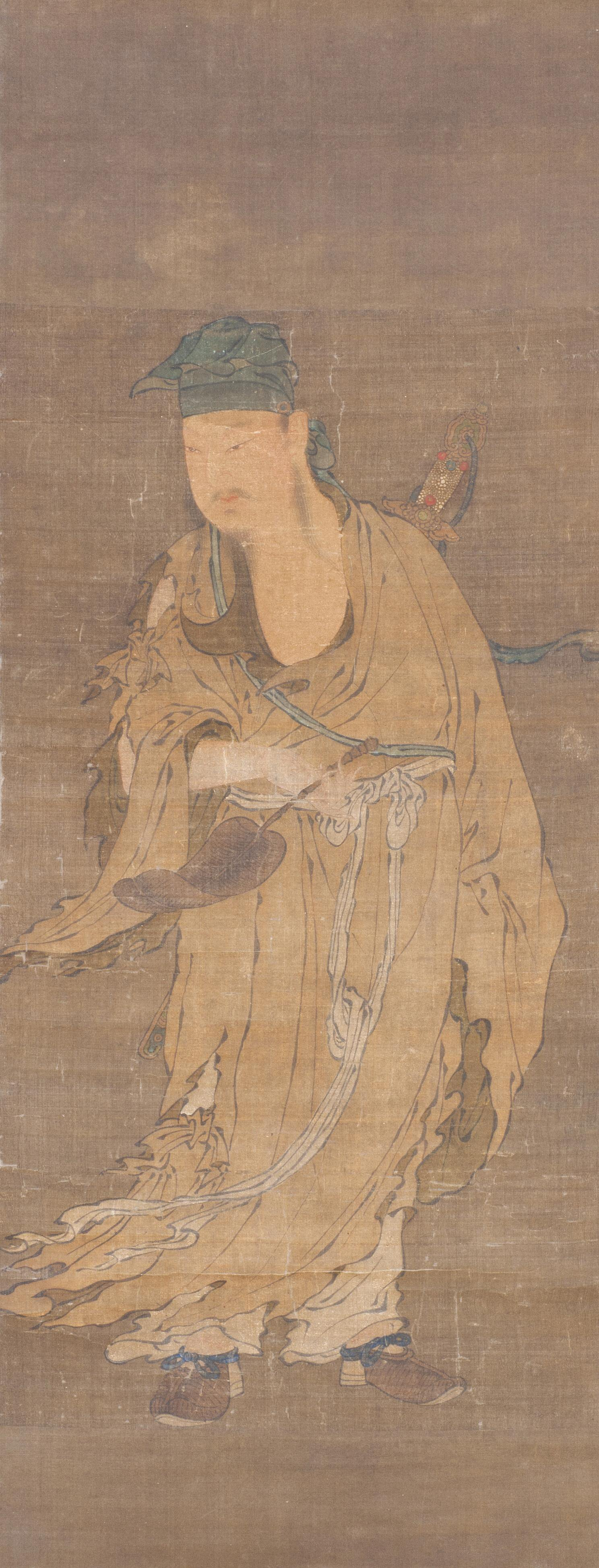
The Daoist Immortal Lü Dongbin, a painting from the Ming dynasty

Legend has that while he was in Chang'an, Lü had to pass ten tests by Zhongli Quan before Quan took him in as a disciple and Lü could subsequently cultivate into an immortal. These ten trials are described below.

1. One day Lü came back from work and found out that his loved one was dying; without sadness or remorse, he started to prepare the dress and coffin necessary for burial, but later his loved one revived and lived on. Lü was still without sadness or joyous feeling.
2. Lü was selling goods at a market and there came a buyer to bargain with him. After agreeing on the price, Lü handed him the stuff but the buyer refused to pay in full and then walked away. Lü would not argue and let him walk away.
3. On the first day of the lunar calendar, Lü met with a beggar. After giving him some money, the beggar kept asking for more and threw vulgar words at him. Lü left the scene with a smile.
4. Lü was once a shepherd. During his tenure a hungry tiger was eyeing the goats under his care. Lü protected the goats by sending them down to the hillside and stood in front of the Tiger. The hungry tiger was awed to see this and left without hurting Lü.
5. Lü was studying at a small hut on a mountain when a beautiful woman came by and asked if she could stay there for the night since she was lost. That night, this beautiful lady was flirting and tried to get Lü to have sex with her, but Lü was untouched by such temptation.
6. One day Lü came back to his house and saw that he had been burglarized and lost all his belongings. Without becoming angry he started to work on his farm. As he dug into the ground he found countless pieces of gold. He uncovered the earth without taking a single piece of the gold.
7. Lü bought some bronze utensils at a market. Upon returning home he realized that all of the utensils were made of gold and he immediately returned them to the seller.
8. A crazy Taoist was selling medicine on the street, telling people that his magic potion would have one of two outcomes: either 1) the drinker would die on the spot, or 2) the drinker would become immortal. No one would dare to try, except Lü, who bought and tried the potion. Nothing happened to him.
9. A river was elevated due to heavy rain. Lü and other passengers were on a boat crossing the river. Before reaching the middle of the journey, the weather deteriorated, and most of the passengers except Lü became worried. Lü took it in his stride and never worried about life and death!
10. Lü was alone at home and suddenly weird things happened. Ghost and monsters were killing each other and wanted to do the same to Lü. Showing no sense of fear, Lü kept on doing his chores without paying attention to them. Another group of devils with blood all over them tried to take Lü's life away by saying to Lü that he owed his previous life to them since in past life Lü took his life. Without any fear Lü said 'go ahead and take my life since I took yours in past life, this is fair and square!' All of a sudden the sky turned blue and those ghost and devils disappeared. Zhongli Quan (Who happened to be his Teacher and Mentor in Taoist stories) was looking and laughing at him while all these events were happening.

These 10 tests proved that Lü was a pure and dignified person and Master Zhongli was very satisfied and happy to take Lü to Nan San Her Ling to pass on his secret to life and subsequently formed a "Zhong-Lü Golden Dan" school of Taoism. Lü, however, decided to change his formula for inner peace in order to bring the benefits of his practice to more human beings, and his path of cultivation continues to guide people to this day.

== Stories and legends ==
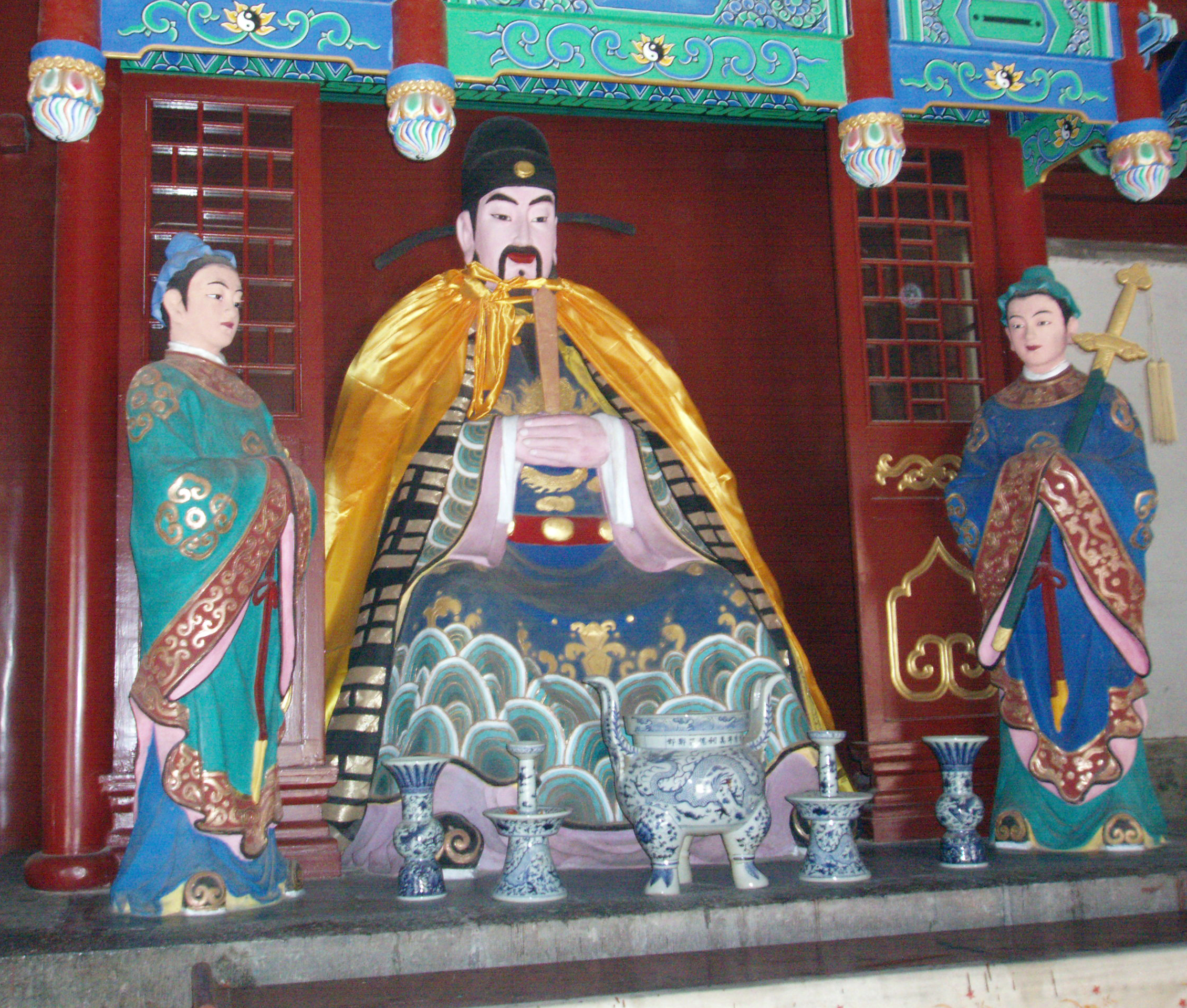
Statue of Lü Dongbin in the temple in Handan

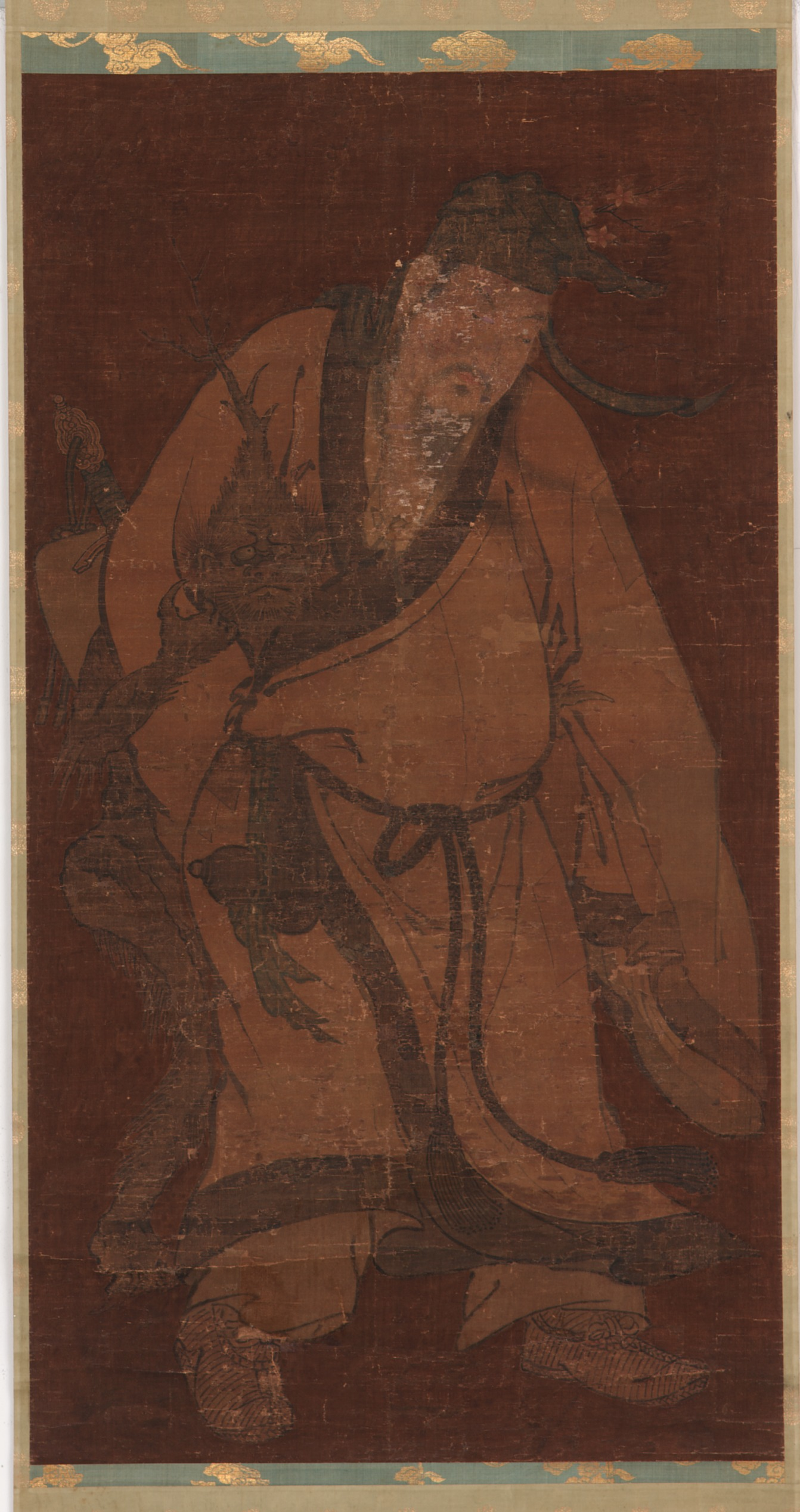
Lü Dongbin Subduing a Demon, unknown artist; formerly attributed to Li Gonglin, Ming dynasty.

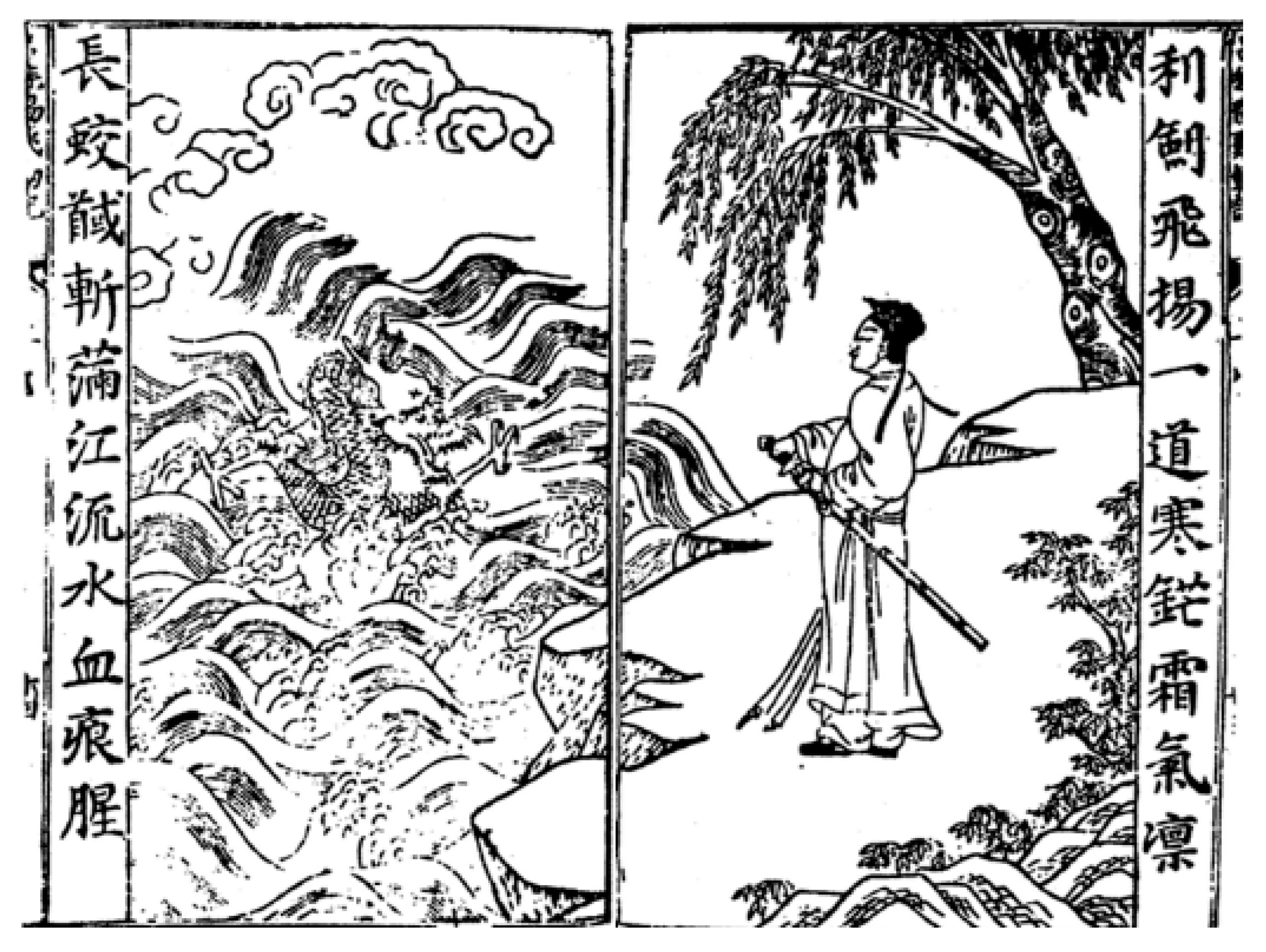
Lü Dongbin confronting a jiaolong-dragon, from Deng Zhimo's The Flying Sword (飛劍記)

Since the Northern Song dynasty, there have been many stories and legends that are connected to Lü Dongbin. The stories were usually about Lü helping others to learn the Tao. According to the official history of the Song dynasty (宋史), Lü was seen several times visiting the house of Chen Tuan (陳摶), who was believed to be the first person to present to the public the Taijitu.

He was popular even centuries before the Northern Song.

The kindness of Lü Dongbin is demonstrated in the Chinese proverb "dog bites Lü Dongbin" (狗咬呂洞賓; gǒu yǎo Lǚ Dòngbīn), which means an inability to recognize goodness and repay kindness with vice. According to the story behind the proverb, Lü Dongbin once argued with Erlang Shen at the heavenly court, which led Xiaotian Quan to harbor deep animosity towards Lü Dongbin. One day, Xiaotian Quan fell into the mortal realm as punishment and was captured by humans and sold at a dog meat shop. Around the same time, Lü Dongbin descended to earth and happened to pass by. He saw what had happened and rescued the dog. However, instead of showing gratitude, the dog bit him, remembering its master's grudge.

Some say that the original proverb should actually be "狗咬呂洞賓，不識好人心," stemming from a story about the friendship between the Dog and Lü Dongbin, who both did for the other great favors, each of which seemed like a disservice initially, signifying the importance of having faith in one's friends. This story is not substantiated because Gou Miao is not mentioned in any classical text, and only popularized on the Internet.

According to Richard Wilhelm, Lü was the founder of the School of the Golden Elixir of Life (Jin Dan Jiao), and originator of the material presented in the book Tai Yi Jin Hua Zong Zhi (太一金華宗旨; "The Secret of the Golden Flower"). Also, according to Daoist legend, he is the founder of the internal martial arts style called "Eight Immortals Sword" (八仙剑), considered to be one of the martial treasures of Wudangshan.

According to one story, Lü's teacher Zhongli Quan became an immortal and was about to fly to heaven, while saying to Lü that if he kept practicing the Tao he would also be able to fly to heaven himself very soon. Lü Dongbin replied to his teacher that he'll fly to heaven only after he enlightens all the sentient beings on earth (another story says all his relatives). According to the book "The Eight Immortals Achieving the Tao" (八仙得道摶), in his previous incarnation, Lü Dongbin was a Taoist master and the teacher of Zhongli Quan.

According to the Taoist book History of the Immortals (歷代神仙通鑒), Lü is the reincarnation of the ancient Sage-King "Huang-Tan-Shi" (皇覃氏).

According to Venerable Hsuan Hua, Lü is one of the transformations of Guanyin (Avalokiteśvara) Bodhisattva.

Lü killed multiple dragons with his magic sword.

=== Lü Dongbin and White Peony (Bai Mudan) ===
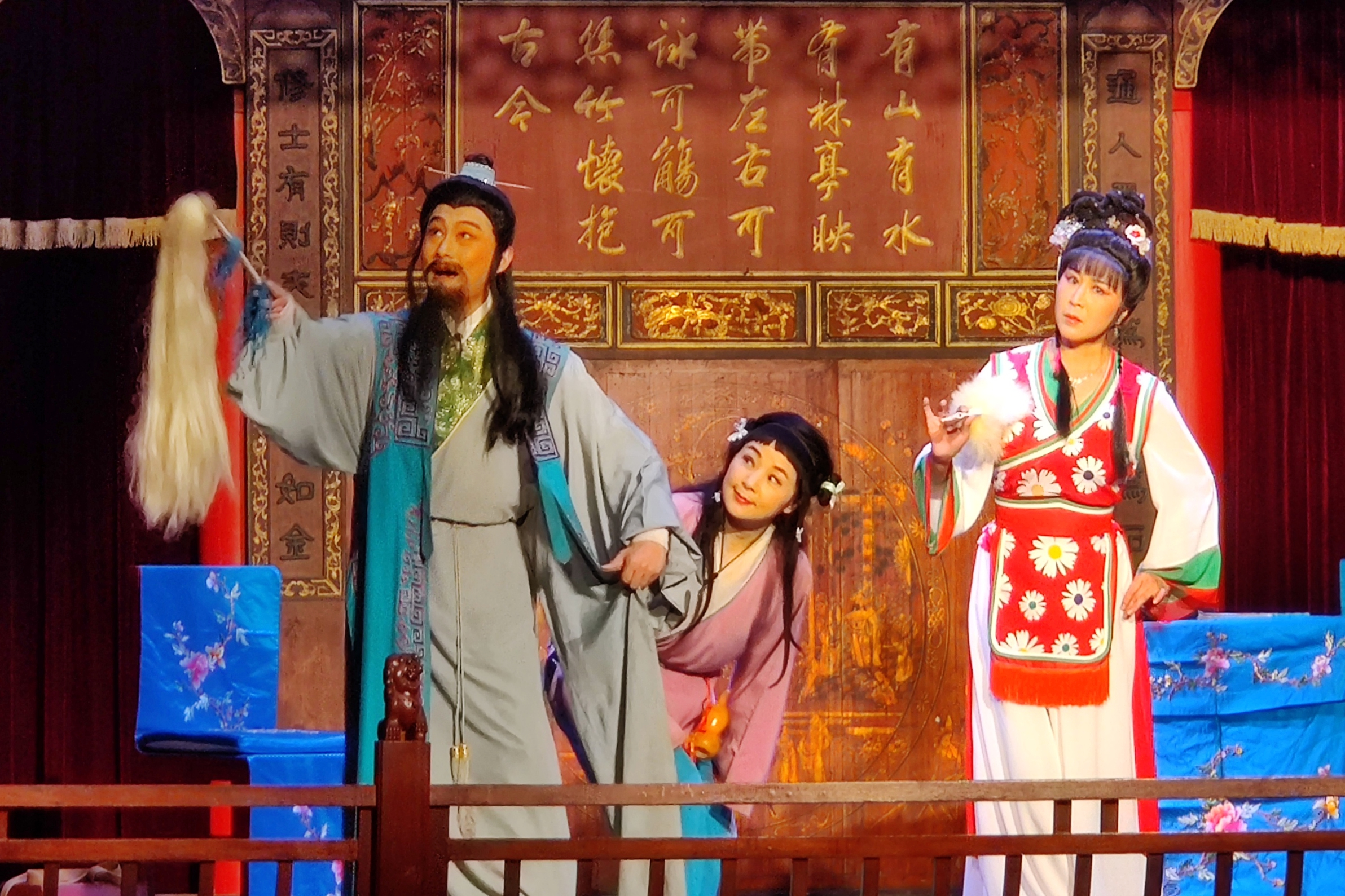
Huaihai opera performance of Lü Dongbin and White Peony.

One of the most popular of Lü Dongbin's legends is his encounter with a prostitute named White Peony (Bai Mudan). The most popular version comes from the novel Journey to the East. It is said that the immortal Lü Dongbin was greatly attracted to White Peony, one of the most beautiful courtesans in Luoyang. Lü Dongbin slept with her many times but never ejaculated, because he did not want to lose his Yang essence. Unfortunately, Lu's immortal colleague Iron-Crutch Li and He Xiangu taught Mudan how to make him ejaculate by tickling his groin. Finally, White Peony successfully made Lü Dongbin ejaculate and absorbed his Yang essence. Later she cultivated herself and became immortal too.

Another version comes from the novel Ba Xian Dedao. This version is more subtle and there is no sexual intercourse here. One day the immortal Lü Dongbin transforms himself into a handsome scholar and tries to advise the famous prostitute White Peony. In their first encounter, White Peony seduces him passionately, but he refuses to sleep with her. In their second encounter, Lü agrees to sleep with her. But as they walk to the bed, Lü suddenly cries that his stomach is painful, and faints. White Peony is very sorry about his condition and calls a doctor using her money (despite her pimp's grumbling, who incites her to throw the sick Lü to the road). Lü (who is only pretending to be sick) is very pleased knowing Peony's merciful heart. In their third encounter, Lü Dongbin finally succeeds in persuading White Peony to leave her wayward life. She finally becomes immortal too.

In the opera version, White Peony is changed from a seductive prostitute to the daughter of a drugstore owner. One day Lü Dongbin comes to their store and makes trouble by asking for impossible medicines. Knowing her father's difficulty, Peony meets Lü and answers all of his question. From quarreling, they finally become lovers.

=== Lü Dongbin Drunk at Yueyang Tower Three Times ===
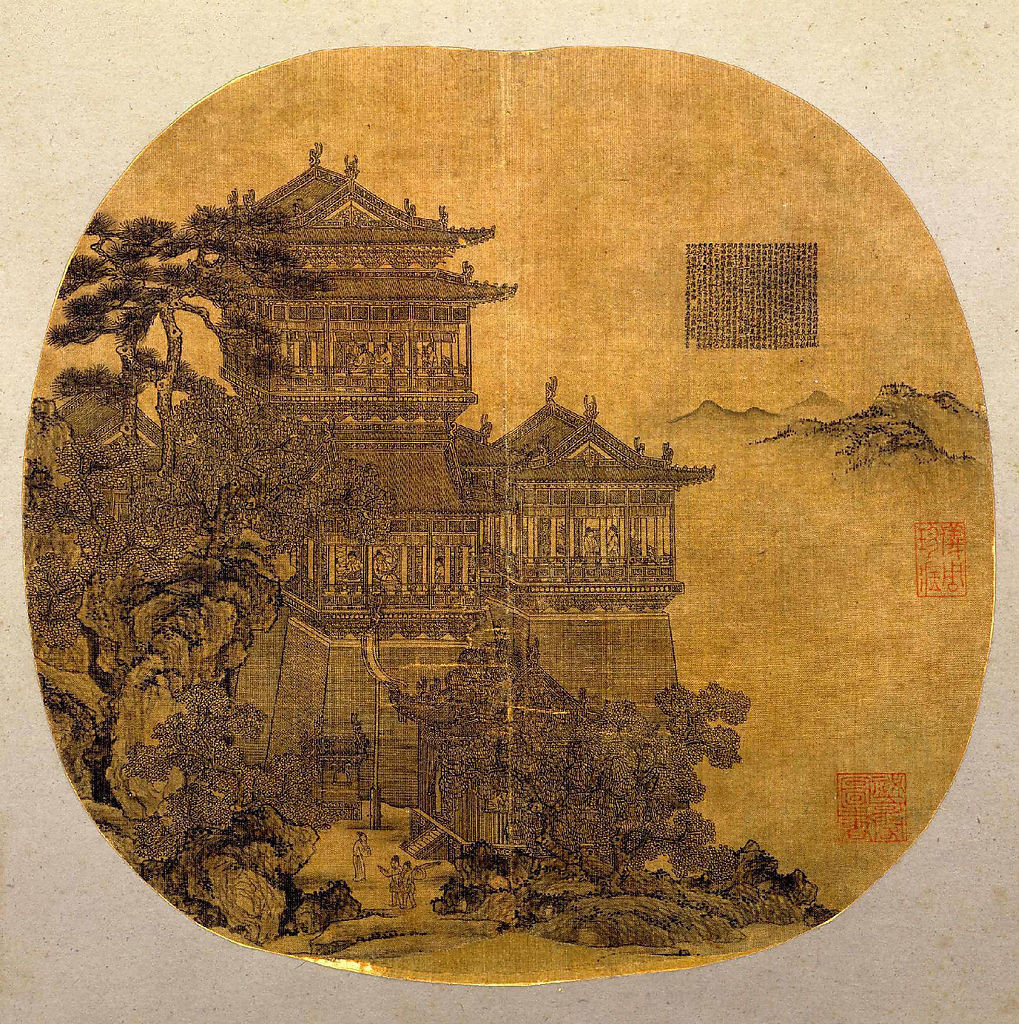
Yueyang Lou (岳阳楼) by Xia Yong, Yuan dynasty

Lü Dongbin Drunk at Yueyang Tower Three Times is a well-known Chinese Taoist tale often depicted in plays, novels, and other forms of art. It tells the story of Lü Dongbin, who helps two spirits, a willow and a plum, to become immortals. He reincarnated them as humans, had them marry, and tested their devotion through many difficult trials. The story recounts that Lü Dongbin visited Yueyang Tower and met the willow spirit, who wanted to become a god but was trapped in a wooden body. Lü Dongbin told the willow spirit to be reborn as a human, promising to return and help him after thirty years.

The willow spirit was reborn as Guo Maer, and the plum spirit as He Lamei. They grew up, married, and opened a teahouse below Yueyang Tower. Lü Dongbin visited Guo Maer twice, but Guo was unable to understand his guidance. On his third visit, Lü Dongbin instructed Guo Maer to kill his wife and become a monk. Though Guo Maer couldn’t bring himself to do it, He Lamei still died, and he was blamed for her death. Later that day, Lü Dongbin returned and revealed that He Lamei was not truly dead. The judges then realized they were all immortals in disguise. Guo Maer learned he was the reincarnated willow spirit, and He Lamei the plum spirit. Together, they followed Lü Dongbin into the Dao and became immortals.

== Modern worship ==
From the early 19th century on, Lüzu's messages were received through fuji (扶乩; 扶箕), which led to the establishment of a network of Lüzu spirit writing halls throughout China, called Zanhuagong (贊化宮). They also offered medical oracles and healing services. Famous Zanhuagong were established in Hong Kong and Guangzhou.

In 19th- and 20th-century Guangdong, belief in the powers of Lüzu was strong. In the century after the 1840s, additional temples were founded which organized Fuji (planchette writing) seances, festivals for the birthdays of the gods, death rituals, and running schools, clinics, and disaster relief.

== Media depictions ==
- In the Singapore Television Drama, Legends of the 8 Immortals, Taiwanese Actor, Steve Ma (Ma Jing Tao) portrays the Character or Lu Dongbin as an Immortal in the Series
- In the television show Jackie Chan Adventures, Dongbin was shown to be the immortal who sealed away Shendu, The Fire Demon.
- Jackie Chan portrayed Lü Dongbin in the film The Forbidden Kingdom.
- In the web serial novel Desolate Era, Lü Dongbin is portrayed as one of the True Yang Immortals.

== See also ==
- Enzhugong (恩主公)
- Weapons and armor in Chinese mythology
- Xian (仙)
