= Women in Taoism =

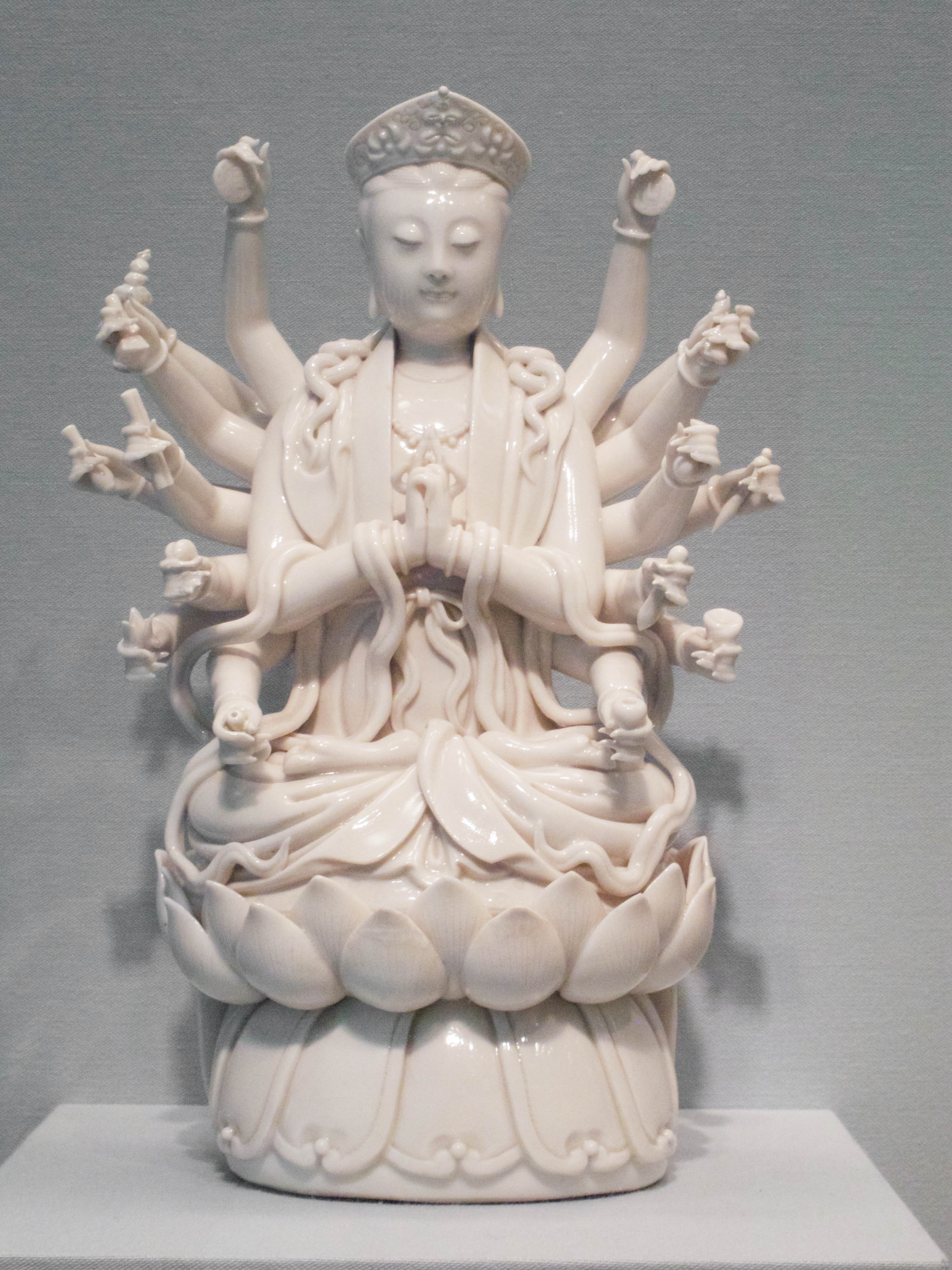
Dehua porcelain statue of the Taoist goddess Doumu (Dipper Mother), adapted from the Buddhist deva Marici, 18th century

The roles of women in Taoism (/ˈdaʊɪzəm/, /ˈtaʊ-/) (also spelled "Daoism" /ˈdaʊ-/) have differed from the traditional patriarchy over women in ancient and imperial China. Chinese women had special importance in some Taoist schools that recognized their transcendental abilities to communicate with deities, who frequently granted women with revealed texts and scriptures. Women first came to prominence in the Highest Clarity School, which was founded in the 4th century by a woman, Wei Huacun. The Tang dynasty (618–907) was a highpoint for the importance of Daoist women, when one-third of the Shangqing clergy were women, including many aristocratic Taoist nuns. The number of Taoist women decreased until the 12th century when the Complete Perfection School, which ordained Sun Bu'er as the only woman among its original disciples, put women in positions of power. In the 18th and 19th centuries, women Taoists practiced and discussed nüdan (女丹, "women's neidan inner alchemy"), involving gender-specific practices of breath meditation and visualization. Furthermore, Taoist divinities and cults have long traditions in China, for example, the Queen Mother of the West, the patron of xian immortality, He Xiangu, one of the Eight Immortals, and Mazu, the protectress of sailors and fishermen.

== Terminology ==
Since organized Taoism began in the late Han dynasty (202 BCE – 220 CE), women have been active in different schools, which gave them diverse names. In the Tianshi Dao (Way of the Celestial Masters), they were called nüshi (女士 or 女師, "female masters") when married to a Master, or nüguan (女官, "female officers") when among chosen zhongmin (種民, "seed people"). In the Shangqing (Highest Clarity) School, Taoist nuns were most often solitary practitioners, and called nü daoshi (女道士, "female Taoists" or "female Taoist masters") or nüguan (女冠, "female hats", describing a distinctive ritual headdress) in the Song dynasty. The Quanzhen (Complete Perfection) School uses daogu (道姑, "ladies of the Dao") in reference to both convent nuns and devout laity.

== History ==
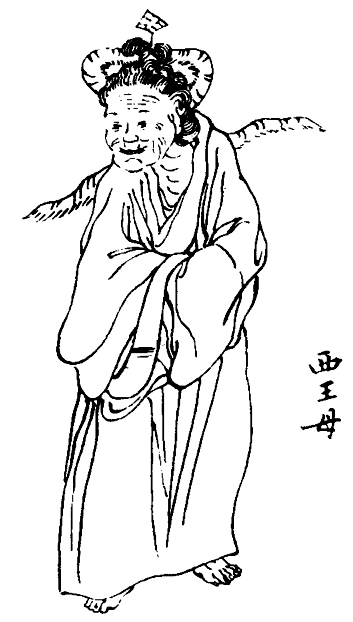
Queen Mother of the West illustration in the Shanhaijing, Qing dynasty edition

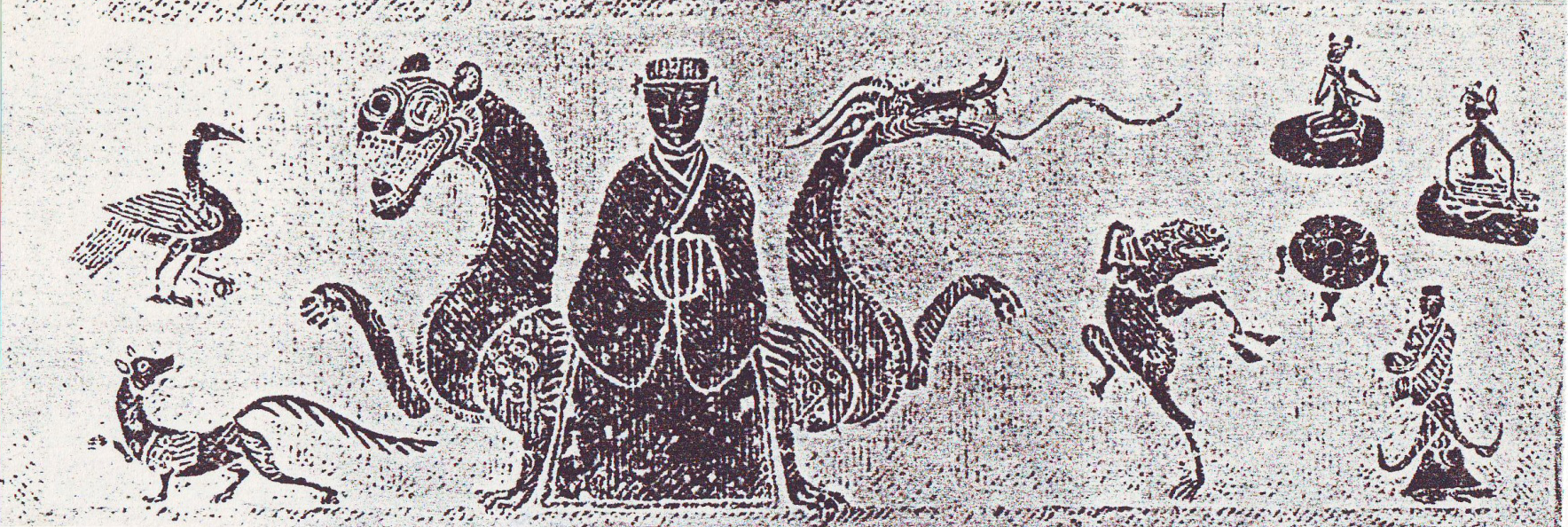
Han Dynasty stone-relief of Xiwangmu

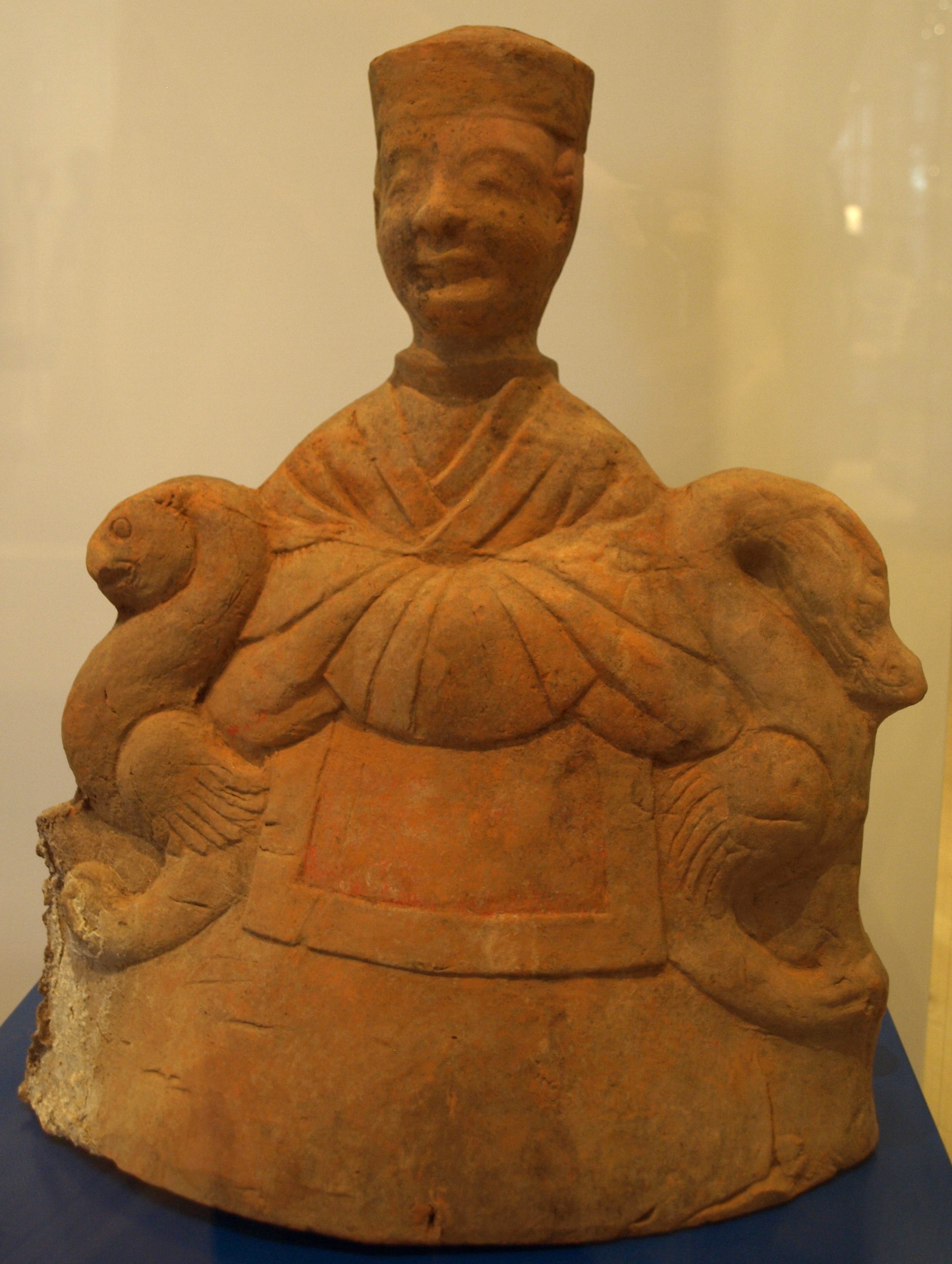
Queen Mother of the West, Han dynasty earthenware, 2nd century CE

=== Pre-Han and Han ===
Xiwang mu, the Queen Mother of the West, is the most prominent female Taoist divinity, although her traditions predated organized Daoist religions. Sources from the Warring States period (475–221 BCE) associate the Queen Mother with shamanistic traditions, such as her familiar the three-legged crow, and her peaches of immortality orchard. The c. 3rd century BCE Shanhaijing (Classic of Mountains and Seas) says, "In appearance, Queen Mother of the West looks like a human, but she has a leopard's tail and the fangs of a tigress, and she is good at whistling. She wears a victory crown on her tangled hair. She presides over the Catastrophes from the Sky and the Five destructive Forces."

During the Han dynasty (206 BCE–220 CE), people believed that the Queen Mother could protect them from disease and death, and she became the central figure worshiped by a peasant sect that arose in Shandong and swept through the country in 3 BCE. Xiwang mu became known as the goddess of epidemics who resided in the west on Kunlun Mountain and ruled over the demons of pestilence. Her sect worshiped the Queen in different regions of China, especially Mount Heng in Hunan, Mount Hua in Shaanxi, and Mount Wuyi in Fujian.

Under the Six Dynasties, the Queen mother's sect was integrated into the pantheon of Shangqing (Highest Clarity) Taoism and she became one of the school's key goddesses, helping both sexes at this time. The worshiping and devotees peaked during the Tang period, when she emerged particularly as the protectress of women, and was revered as the representative of the female ideal. Since the Song dynasty, Xiwang mu's sect within official Taoism has been increasingly supplanted by that of other goddesses. She has nevertheless continued to be a major figure in sectarian movements and small congregational groups who received messages from her through fuji spirit writing. Descending onto the altar during séances, under the Ming and Qing she took on the title Wusheng Laomu (無生老母, Unborn Venerable Mother), and still remains a key goddess worshiped by women, especially in popular settings.

=== Early Middle Ages ===
Women began to become important in organized Taoism during the Three Kingdoms and Six Dynasties (221–590) and Sui dynasty (590–618) periods. In the 4th century the Shangqing School recognized a woman, Wei Huacun (251–334), as the school's founder. Women in this Taoist school transmitted scriptures, taught methods, and served as initiators.

Married to a leading Tianshi officer, Wei Huacun became a respected jijiu (祭酒, libationer), which means that she received a thorough religious education in the organization, including sexual rites of passage and the reception of official registers. Her hagiography says that she attained the Tao on Mount Heng, which at the time was a highly active center of both Buddhist and Taoist practices. She was accordingly called Nanyue Furen (南嶽夫人, Lady of the Southern Marchmount). After this time, she became the object of an important following which, especially under the Tang became prominent among women Taoists and spread throughout China.

According to a Six Dynasties text, the Tianshi School distinguished five different types of women suited to become Taoist practitioners: young unmarried girls, women unable to marry due to an inauspicious horoscope, women forced into marriage, widows, and rejected wives. These were all undesirable classes, rejected by society, to which Tianshi offered a form of escape and an alternative. Such a status allowed these women to have at least some role and not be excluded completely. The same pattern also held true for other Taoist schools and periods, especially during the Tang dynasty.

=== Tang ===
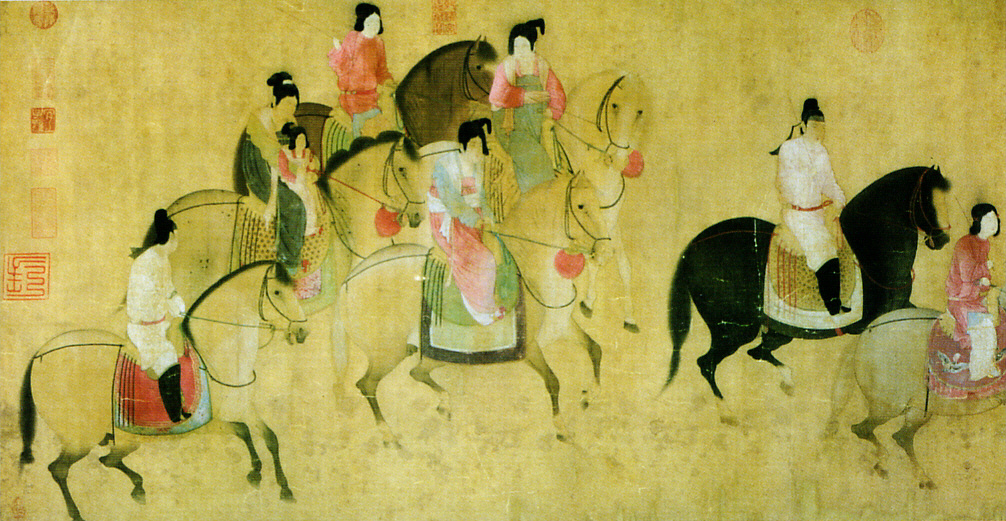
Spring Excursion of Emperor Xuanzong's Court, by Zhang Xuan (713–755)

The status of women in Taoism reached a peak during the Tang dynasty (618–907), particularly in the 8th century, when women formed one-third of the clergy. Under the auspices of the Shangqing School, which dominated organized Taoism under the Tang, women reached their most prominent religious positions as initiators, preceptors, and possessors of sacred texts and methods. This was actively supported by Emperor Xuanzong of Tang (r. 712–756), whose "passions for women and Taoism extended to women Taoists". According to the official statistics, there were 1,687 Taoist temples in the 8th century: 1,137 for men and 550 for women. Women thus constituted an important part of the Taoist clergy as it was recognized officially.

The rise of aristocratic Taoist nuns during the Tang was an unprecedented development in Chinese society and history. More than ten imperial daughters became ordained Taoist nuns and converted their residences into convents. Separated from the Chinese social order through their religious conversion, the women could both maintain their political influence and avoid palace intrigues. They economically benefited from their new status, enjoying a remarkable degree of personal freedom for a Tang woman, often led a licentious life, traveled extensively, and devoted themselves to the arts.

Women would enter Taoist convents for differing reasons, such as girls purifying their lives before entering society or widows seeking a better life. Sometimes a woman would become a Taoist nun in order to escape an unwanted marriage or to change her husband. Princess Taiping, the youngest daughter of Emperor Gaozong (r. 649–683) and Empress Wu, entered a Taoist convent in 670 to escape a requested marriage of state with the king of "barbarian" Turpan. Yang Guifei (Most Honorable Consort Yang), the beloved concubine of Emperor Xuanzong, was married to Li Mao, the emperor's eighteenth son; she left him by becoming a Taoist nun in 745, which then allowed her to enter Xuanzong's imperial harem.

A celebrated example of noble Taoist nuns was the elaborate 711 ordination ceremony of two imperial princesses, Xining (西寧) and Changlong (昌隆), the eighth and ninth daughters of Emperor Ruizong of Tang (r. 684–690) and sisters of Emperor Xuanzong. The Taoist ritualist Zhang Wanfu (張萬福) described the princesses' splendiferous 14-day ordination rite, and noted the widespread criticism from ministers and officials about the high costs. The emperor also ordered the construction of two monasteries for his daughter nuns in Chang'an, nearby the imperial concubines.

Official Taoism incorporated several female-based sects during the Tang. While local followings had always flourished in the north and northwest of China, they predominantly began in the maritime and central regions of the east and south where divine women, including goddesses, shamanesses, and cultic founders, grew in stature and often became objects of pilgrimages undertaken equally by men and women. Taoist texts often described the integration of regional divinities into the official pantheon as conquests, and praised female Taoists for their exceptional powers as prophets, healers, and saviors.

The lesser-known Qingwei (清微, Pure Subtlety) school, a tradition that emphasized therapy and exorcism, incorporated a local sect founded by the Taoist priestess Zu Shu (祖舒, fl. 889–904) from Lingling (near present-day Yongzhou, Hunan). Unlike the well-documented biography of Wei Huacun, little is known about Zu. After receiving ordination in the traditions of Taoist Tianshi, Shangqing, and Lingbao schools, she went to Guiyang (present-day Chenzhou, Hunan) where she met Lingguang shengmu (靈光聖母, Holy Mother of Numinous Radiance), who transmitted to Zu Shu the Way of Pure Subtlety together with talismans and exorcism techniques, said to have been passed down from Yuanshi Tianzun (Heavenly Worthy of Primordial Beginning). Later Qingwei followers placed Zu at the head of their "patriarchal" lineage, which Chen Cai (陳采) first constructed in the 13th-century Qingwei xianpu (清微仙普, "Account of the Immortals of Pure Subtlety"). According to Catherine Despeux, Zu Shu seems more like a southern shaman than a religious visionary. Rather than an active founder, she appears in the Pure Subtlety school mainly as a preceptor who transmitted methods that she learned from another woman.

=== Song ===
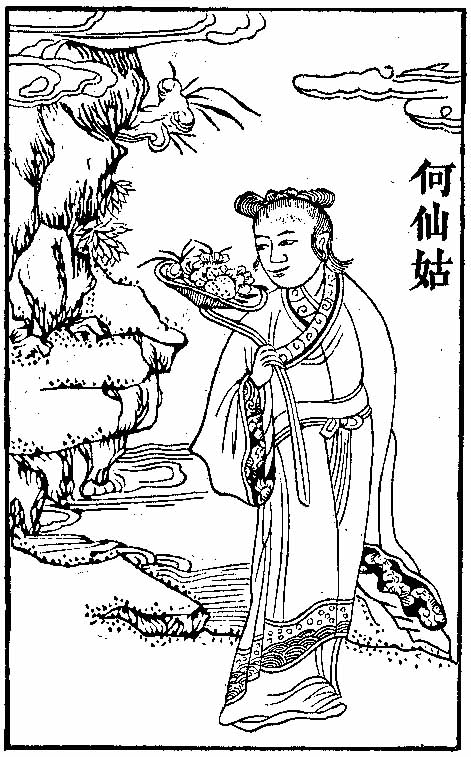
Woodblock illustration of He Xiangu

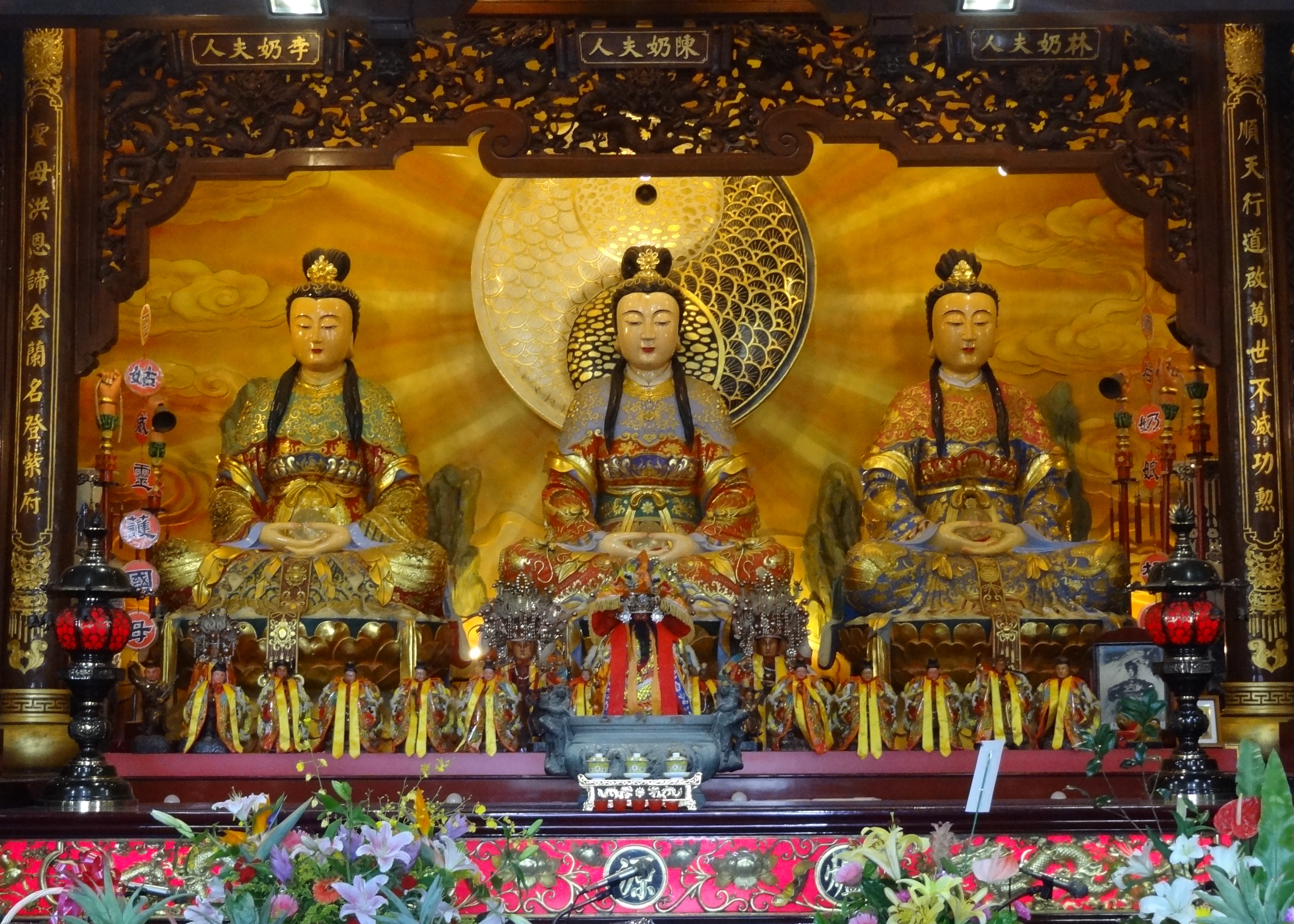
Linshui furen and her attendants, at the Lushan school Temple of Heavenly Harmony in Luodong, Taiwan

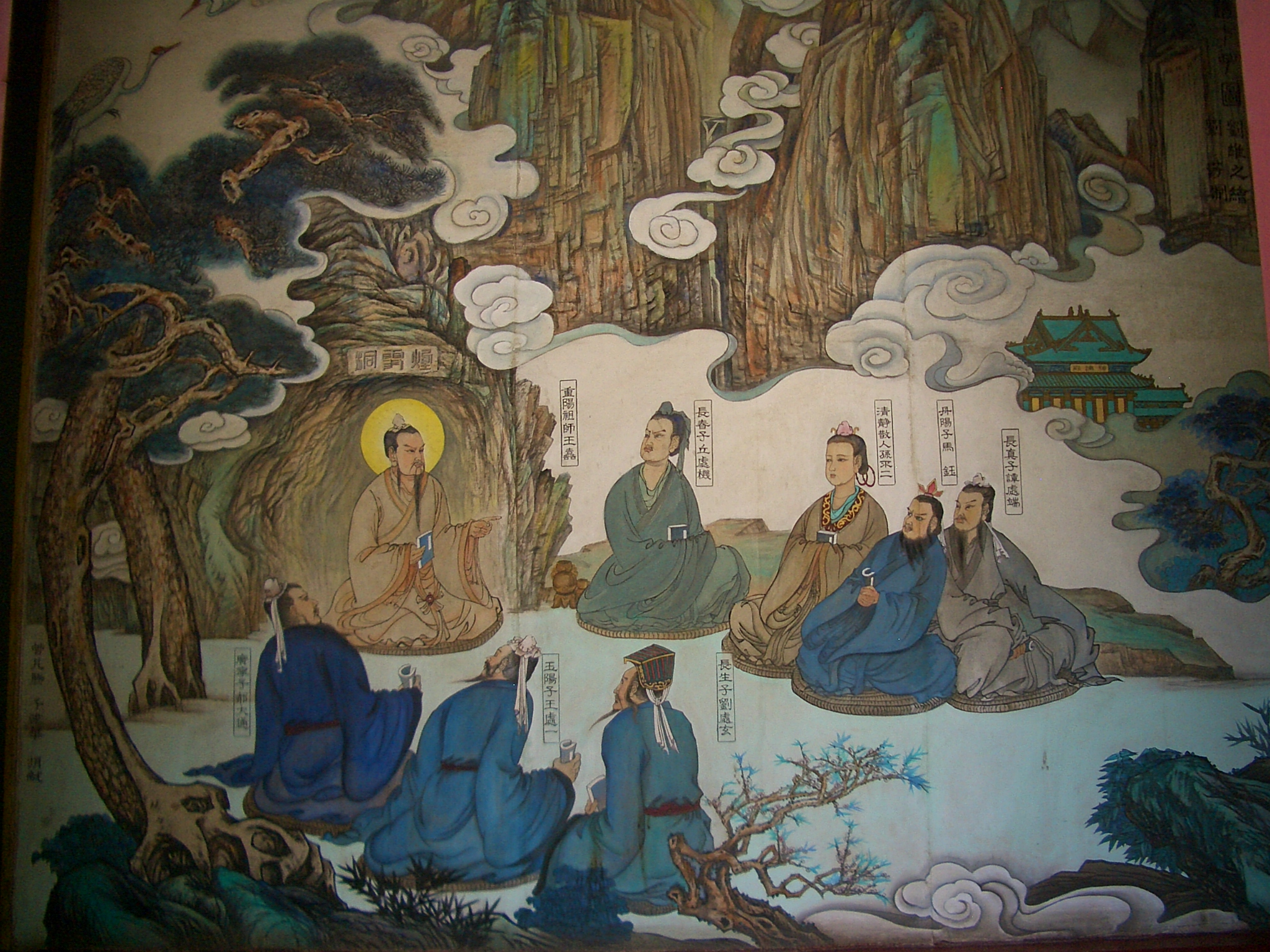
Wang Chongyang and his seven Quanzhen School masters, with Sun Bu'er in the middle of the back row

In the early Song dynasty (960–1279) the number of women Taoists declined to about 3–5% of the registered clergy and only rose again later, with the emergence of the Quanzhen School in the late 12th century during the Jin dynasty (1115–1234). Nevertheless, cults of women continued to flourish and there were some senior female practitioners of various techniques.

Among the cults, in addition to the Queen Mother of the West, the Taoist pantheon includes other well-known female divinities. For instance, He Xiangu (Immortal Maiden He), one of the Eight Immortals, whose cult was established between the Tang and Song dynasties.

The cult of Linshui furen (臨水夫人, the Lady of the Water's Edge), or Chen Jinggu (陳靖姑, 767–791), became popular during the Song era. According to Taoist tradition, she was born with various supernatural abilities, but died young and pregnant during a rain-making ritual. Her powers began to manifest after her death and she gradually grew into the protectress of women, children, and jitong (乩童, boy mediums). The cult first developed in Chen's home state of Min (Fujian), and then was canonized in the Song as Linshui furen. Many practices of this women's movement were shamanistic, Linshui furen and her sisters were praised as magicians, controllers of demons, exorcists, and healers who could undertake shamanic travels into the afterlife. Linshui furen's cult grew and established her more formally as a divinity, and her fame spread more widely. Later this Taoist cult became particularly prominent in Taiwan, where the Lady of the Water's Edge served as a focal point for communities of women who refused marriage but did not wish to become celibate, and instead preferred lesbian life).

Among female Taoist practitioners, Cao Wenyi (曹文逸, fl. 1119–1125) was a renowned author who was posthumously honored as the first woman to practice neidan inner alchemy. Song bibliographies list her writings to include commentaries on various Taoist texts, including the Xishengjing (Scripture of Western Ascension) and Daodejing, and a long poem on neidan entitled Lingyuan dadao ge (靈源大道歌, "Song of the Great Tao, the Numinous Source"). It begins, "I am telling all you ladies straight: The stem of destiny grows from perfect breathing that irradiates the body and provides long life, whether empty or not empty, and brings forth the numinous mirror which contains Heaven and all beings." Emperor Huizong of Song (r. 1100–1125) heard of Cao's fame, called her to the capital Kaifeng, and conferred the title Wenyi zhenren (文逸真人, Perfected One of Literary Withdrawal). In the Qing dynasty, Lady Cao supposedly appeared in spirit-writing séances and was venerated by several lineages of women's inner alchemy. Some of her writings are preserved in the White Cloud Temple in Beijing, where the Daoist Qingjing (清靜, Purity and Tranquility) school honors her as their patroness.

While women were of lesser importance in Taoism through most of the Song, their position rose again with the growth of the Quanzhen School, in which they served as abbesses of major temples and leaders of local associations. The Quanzhen list of seven masters includes a woman, Sun Bu'er (1119–1183). She was born into a powerful local family in Ninghai in Shandong, received a literary education, and married Ma Yu (馬鈺, 1123–1183) who also became one of the seven masters. When the Quanzhen founder Wang Chongyang visited Ninghai in 1167, Ma Yu and Sun Bu'er became active disciples. She later became a senior leader, ordained as Qjngjing sanren (清靜散人, Serene Lady of Purity and Tranquility), with the right to teach and ordain other woman followers.

=== Yuan, Ming, and Qing ===
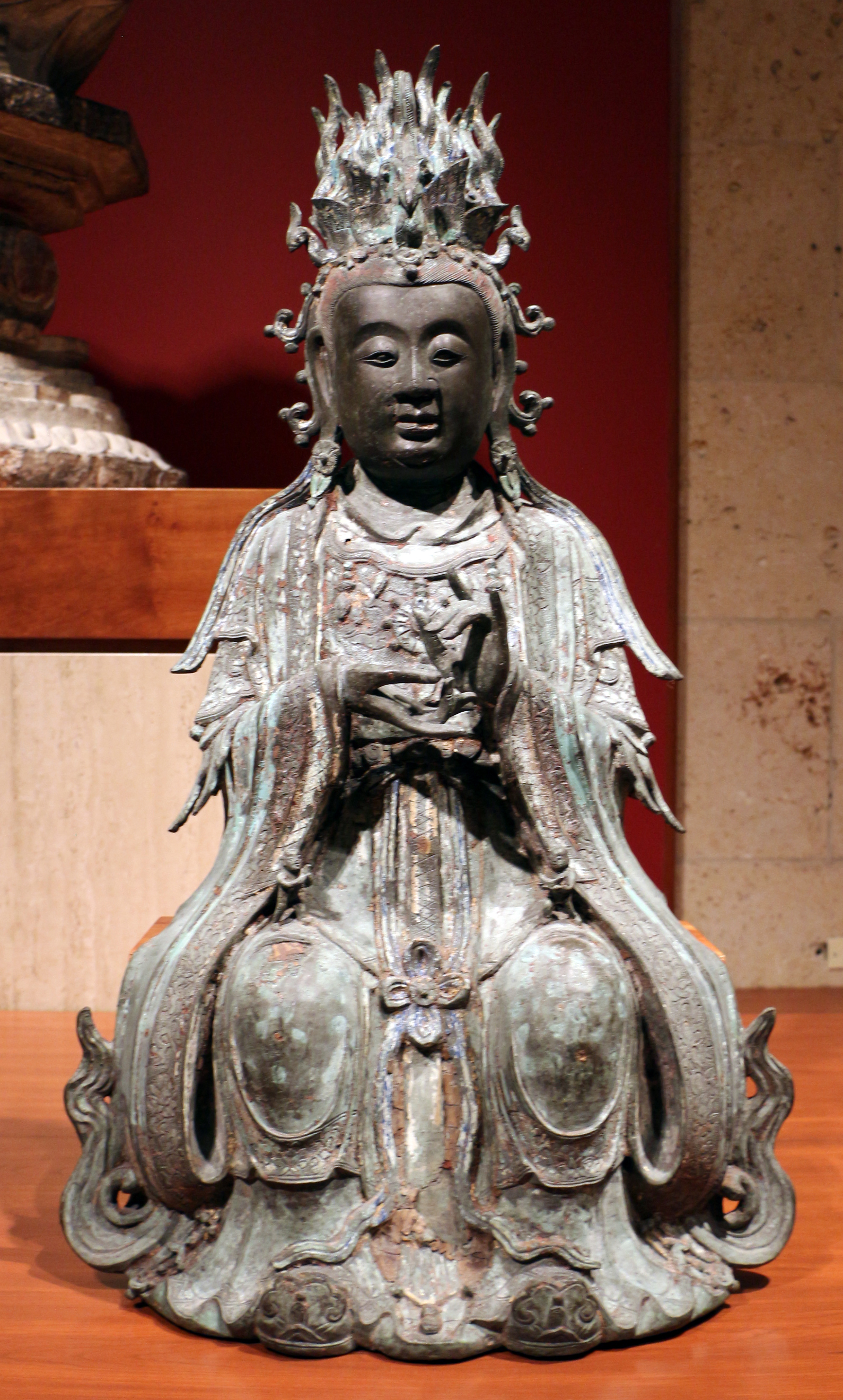
Bixia yuanjun statue, bronze with traces of pigment, Ming dynasty 15th century

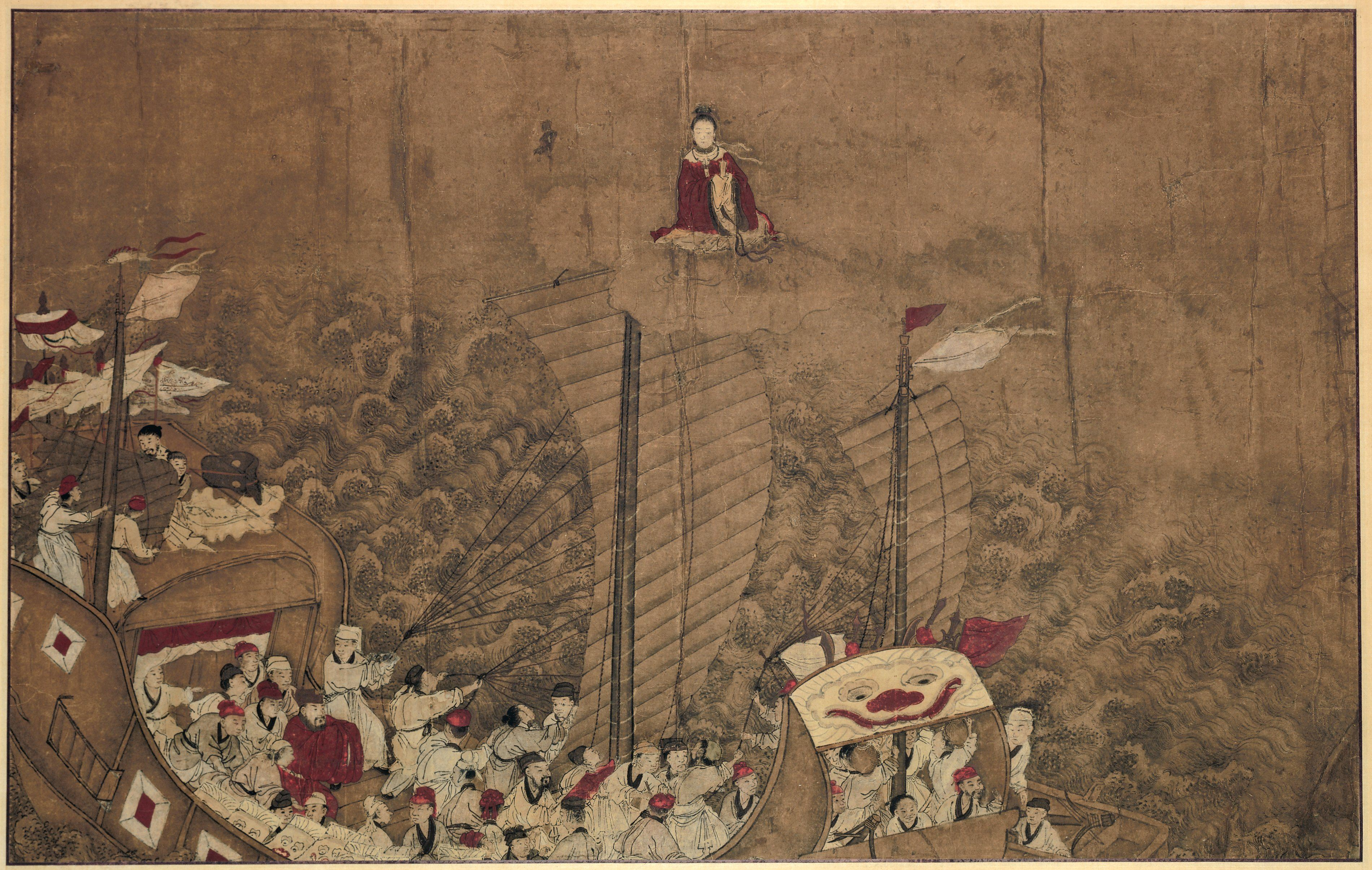
Mazu's miraculous rescue of Emperor Huizong of Song's envoy Lu Yundi (路允迪) returning from Goryeo in 1123

While the cult of Sun Bu'er became increasingly important during the Yuan (1271–1368), Ming (1368–1644) and Qing (1644–1912) dynasties, the general prestige of Taoist women decreased. Under the Yuan dynasty, when the Mongols governed China, there were 20,000 registered Taoists, many of them women, and institutions run by and for women were established throughout the country. References to women in Taoism become less frequent in the late Yuan and early Ming periods, and hagiographies of women are rare. The image of women became more complex in Qing sectarianism, which witnessed a revival of the tendency to honor women as matriarchs. The Qing rulers instituted the Gelug school of Tibetan Buddhism as the state religion, and forced Buddhists and Taoists to use the same institutions. Some Taoist subsects and local groups had lineages that go back to a woman founder. In addition, Qing authors wrote texts specifically dealing with inner alchemy for women.

Cults of female deities developed mainly in the southern and coastal regions of Anhui, Hunan, Jiangxi, Fujian, Guangxi, and Guangdong. Cult sites in these provinces were centers of intense religious activity and pilgrimage sites that attracted both male and female devotees. Beginning in the Tang period, the growth and reputation of the cults depended on their recognition by official Taoist institutions, learned circles, and the imperial court.

The Taoist pantheon adopted several popular goddesses. One of them is the Buddhist goddess Marici, the personification of light and daughter of the creator god Brahma who rules destiny. In Daoism, she appears as Doumu (斗母, Mother of the Big Dipper) and protectress against violence and peril.

The cult of Bixia yuanjun (碧霞元君, Goddess of the Morning Clouds) began in the Song with the discovery of a statue on Mount Tai, and during the Ming she was venerated as the daughter of Dongyue dadi (東岳大帝, Great Deity of Mount Tai), and merciful helper of dead souls. As documented in the Bixia yuanjun huguo baosheng jing (碧霞元君護國保生經, "Scripture on the Guarding of Life and Protection of the Country through the Goddess of the Morning Clouds"), she was officially integrated into the pantheon through formal empowerment by Yuanshi Tianzun (Heavenly Worthy of Primordial Beginning), who reportedly gave her the necessary spells and talismans for helping people.

The water deity Mazu (Ancestral Mother) or Tianfei (天妃, Celestial Consort), the tutelary of seafarers and fishermen, is prominent among the emerging new Taoist goddesses, and parallels the Buddhist goddess of compassion Guanyin who similarly saves mariners. She is the deification of the shamaness Lin Moniang (林默娘, 960–987) a fisherman's daughter from Meizhou Island off Fujian. Refusing to marry, she practiced self-cultivation until she was able to command nature in order to protect herself, and then used her powers to rescue her father and brothers whenever they were in danger of drowning. After an early death, her spirit powers increased and she became famous for safeguarding fishermen and traveling merchants. The Mazu cult began in Fujian at the end of the 10th century, and by the 13th had spread throughout the maritime coastal provinces of Guangdong, Zhejiang, Jiangsu, and Anhui. In the present day, her cult has spread throughout Southeast Asia and overseas Chinese communities, with major Chinese sanctuaries in Tianjin and Quanzhou, 510 temples in Taiwan, and 40 in Hong Kong.

== Texts ==
Sources on women in Taoism include both collections of biographies of xian ("immortals; transcendents"), technically "hagiographies" insofar as xian are saints, and works by women authors, particularly about neidan inner alchemy.

=== Hagiographies ===
Taoist biographical compilations, dating back to the c. 2nd century CE Liexian zhuan and 4th century Shenxian zhuan, generally include hagiographies of both men and women, but there are two works dealing exclusively with the lives of women in Taoism.

The first text is the 913 Yongcheng jixian lu (墉城集仙錄, Records of the Immortals Gathered in the Walled City), compiled by the Taoist priest and author Du Guangting (850–933). Du's preface says the original text contained 109 hagiographies of Shangqing masters, but the received text exists in two partial versions, with 37 biographies in the canonical Daozang and 28 in the Yunji Qiqian anthology, only two of which are identical. Based on the extant fragments of the collection, the majority of Taoist women presented belonged to the Shangqing School during the Tang. In his preface Du Guangting emphasizes that, according to Shangqing teachings, the Primordial Father (Yuanfu 元父) and the Metal Mother Jinmu 金母) are in charge of entering the names of male and female adepts in the heavenly registers of immortality, which are overseen by Xiwangmu, protectress of the immortals of Yongcheng, the Heavenly Walled City on Mount Kunlun. This description does not imply any form of gender hierarchy or preference, but rather shows a complementarity between the two, echoing earlier periods when worship of the Queen Mother was dominant among popular cults. The 3rd-century Bowuzhi (Record of Ample Things) quotes Laozi that, "all people are under the care of the Queen Mother of the West. Only the destinies of kings, sages, men of enlightenment, immortals and men of Tao are cared for by the Lord of the Nine Heavens."

The second is the Houji 後集 (Later Compilation) portion of Lishi zhenxian tidao tongjian (歷世真仙體道通鋻, Comprehensive Mirror of Perfected Immortals and Those Who Embodied the Tao through the Ages), compiled by the Yuan hagiographer Zhao Daoyi (趙道一, fl. 1294–1307) of the Quanzhen school. The text contains 120 biographies, including many found in the Yongcheng jixian lu, and combines mythic Taoist deities, such as Laozi's mother Wushang yuanjun (無上元君, All-Highest Goddess), Doumu, and Xiwangmu, with real women, including fourteen biographies of Song women.

=== Works written by women ===
Emperor Xuanzong's younger sister Yuzhen gongzhu (玉真公主, Princess of Jade Perfection) who became a Taoist nun wrote two texts, both dated 738: the Qionggong wudi neisi shangfa (瓊宮五帝內思上法, Highest Methods of Visualizing the Five Emperors of the Jasper Palace) and Lingfei liujia neisi tongling shangfa (靈飛六甲內思通靈上法, Highest Methods of Visualizing the Flying Spirits of the Six Jia to Communicate with the Divine). Both describe meditation methods used in the Shangqing school, and her calligraphy was preserved in a Tang calligraphic collection by Zhong Shaojing.

The 848 Huangting neijing wuzang liufu buxie tu (黃庭內景五臟六腑補瀉圖, Illustrated Description of the Tonification or Dispersion of the Five Organs and Six Viscera According to the Yellow Court Scripture) was written by the Tang Taoist physiologist Hu Jin (胡惜), said to have been taught by the mythological Sunü (素女, Immaculate Girl) on Mount Taibai in Shaanxi. This text contains a discussion of the central organs in the human body, and lists neidan therapies for internal ailments, including drugs, energy absorptions, dietary restrictions, and gymnastic exercises. They correspond with the meditational techniques from the c. 4th-century Yellow Court Classic that were popular during the Tang. The illustrations have been long lost, but the book is "full of therapy and pharmacy, throwing valuable light on the borderline between medicine and Taoist physiological alchemy".

Cao Wenyi's 12th-century Lingyuan dadao ge (靈源大道歌, "Song of the Great Tao of the Numinous Source") is also attributed to He Xiangu, the only female of the Eight Immortals. This lengthy Chan Buddhism–influenced poem does not specifically mention anything female, but Qing Taoists associated its author with women's inner alchemical practices, and the text was accordingly included into collections on the subject.

=== Works on women's inner alchemy ===
A corpus of Taoist literature concerning nüdan (女丹, women's [inner] alchemy), or kundao (坤道, "the female way", with kun "female; 8th of the 8 trigrams, ☷), comprises about thirty documents of unequal length, dating from 1743 to 1892. These texts are generally attributed to both male and female divinities and said to have been transmitted through spirit-writing. The few earlier sources that specifically mentioned neidan practices for women were typically in terms of yin and yang correlations. Since yin is associated with women and left while yang with men and right, the breath supposedly turns toward the left in men and toward the right in women.

The 1834 Gu Shuyinlou cangshu (古書隱樓藏書, "Collection of the Ancient Hidden Pavilion of Books"), edited by Min Yide (閔一得), contains two consecutive works about women's internal alchemy. First, the Xiwang mu nüxiu zhengtu shize (西王母女修正途十則, "Ten Principles of the Queen Mother of the West on the Correct Path of Female Cultivation") was revealed in 1795 by Sun Bu'er to Li Niwan (李泥丸). The original title was Nü jindan jue (女金丹訣, "Women's Formula of the Golden Elixir"). The text shows some Tantric Buddhist influence, and presents ten rules specifically for women's practice, including techniques on how to intercept menstruation, breast massages, visualization of qi meridians in the body, and breath meditation exercises. Second, the Niwan Li zushi nüzong shuangxiu baofa (泥丸李祖師女宗雙修寶筏, "Precious Raft of Women's Double Cultivation According to Master Li Niwan"), subtitled Nügong zhinan (女功指南, "A Compass of Women's Practice"), was also revealed to Li in 1795. The text explains nine rules for the progressive transformation of the adept's body, including calming and purifying the spirit, increasing energy circulation through breast massages, eventually leading to the accumulation of wisdom, and formation of a new spiritual "body of light" within the adept's body.

He Longxiang's (賀龍驤) Nüdan hebian (女丹合編, Collected Works on Inner Alchemy for Women) was included in the 1906 edition Daozang jiyao (道藏輯要, "Essentials of the Taoist Canon"). His preface notes that he spent thirty years collecting and compiling the collection, based on the practices undertaken by the Taoist women in his family. The materials consist of about twenty prose and poetry texts that outline the various major stages of the inner alchemical path, precisely describe the energy meridians, and make clear distinctions between men's and women's practices.

The Nü jindan fayao (女金丹法要, "Essential Methods of Women's Golden Elixir"), by Fu Jinquan (傅金銓, 1765–1844), mostly consists of poems and prose texts revealed by Sun Bu'er through planchette writing. The author emphasizes the importance of cultivating companionship with others and the necessity of performing virtuous acts. Women adepts are supposed to purify their karma, repent their sins, and cultivate goodness, sincerity, filial piety, and proper wifely devotion. Fu Jinquan also compiled nüdan texts in the early 19th century collection Daoshu shiqi zhong (道書十七種, "Seventeen Books on the Tao").

The Nüzi daojiao congshu (女子道教叢書, Collection of Taoist Writings for Women), compiled by Yi Xinying (易心瑩, 1896–1976), contains eleven texts, describing women's liturgy, women's Taoist lineages, the principles of body transmutation, interception of menses, and interior cultivation.

== Practices ==
=== Women's inner alchemy ===
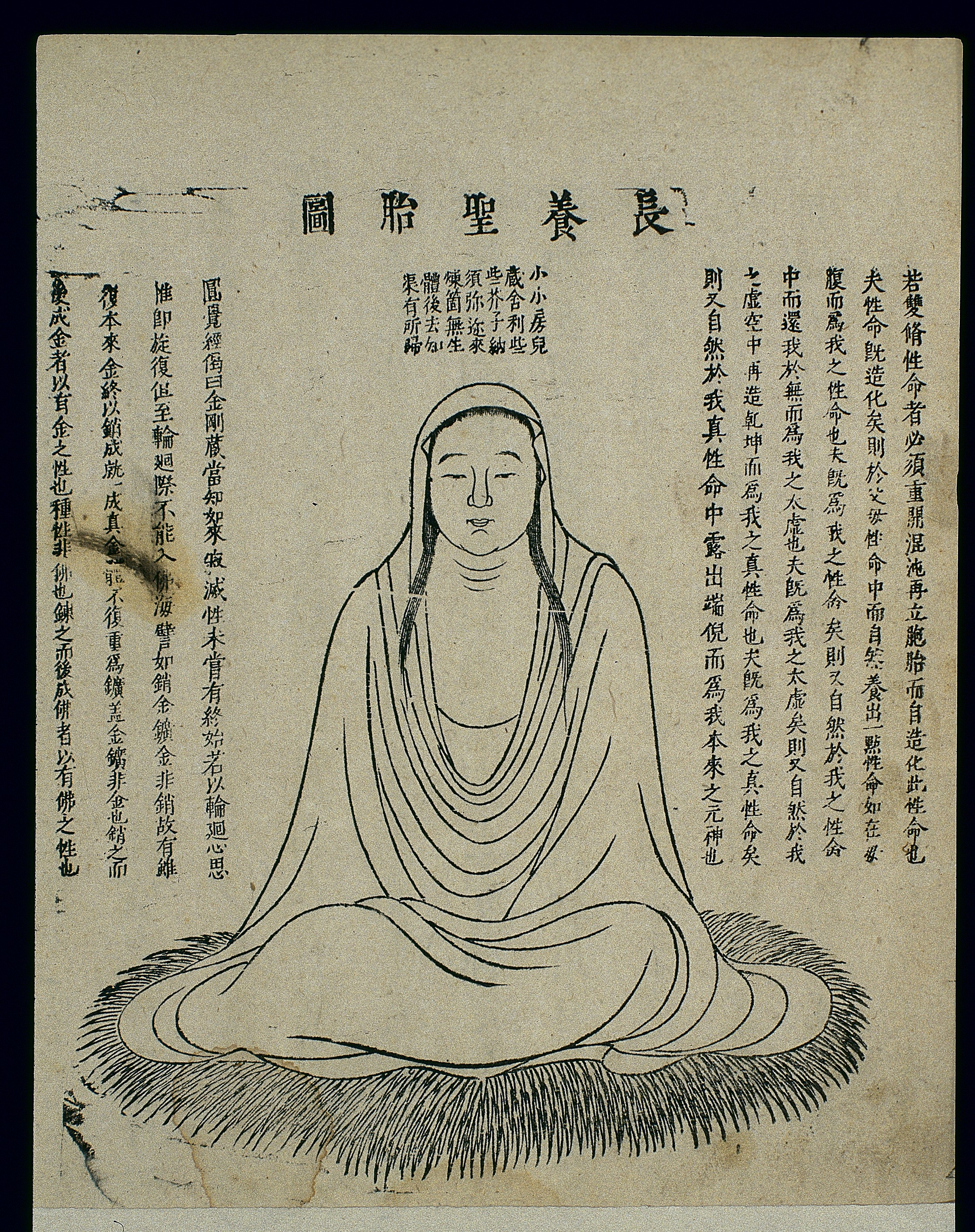
Woodblock illustration of a female adept practicing neidan "Nourishing and growing the sacred embryo", 1615 Xingming guizhi (性命圭旨, Pointers on Spiritual Nature and Bodily Life)

Writings on inner alchemy for women emphasize the shengtai (聖胎, "Sacred Embryo; Immortal Embryo") of sainthood. The process has three stages transforming the Three Treasures of jing (精, "essence; semen; menstrual fluid"), qi (氣, "vitality; energy; breath"), and shen (神, "spirit; deity; supernatural being"). First, refining the jing essence and transforming it into qi energy; second, refining the energy and transforming it into shen spirit; and third, refining the spirit to return to (xu 虛) emptiness. In the first stage, the adept transforms the various yin and yang forces within the body into an embryo of energy. During the second stage and in the course of ten symbolic months, this embryo gives birth to the yuanshen (元神, original spirit force). This birth takes place through the fontanelle, because the alchemical process inverts the course of natural procedures. This luminous spirit leaves and re-enters the body, and then is further sublimated in the third stage to eventually merge back completely into cosmic emptiness.

Only the first stage differentiates practices between men and women. In neidan terminology, semen is called baihu (白虎, White Tiger) and menstrual blood is chilong (赤龍, Red Dragon). Instead of refining seminal essence and transforming it into energy, women refine their menstrual blood by progressively diminishing their flow and eventually stopping it altogether. This is known as duan chilong (斷赤龍, "cutting off the Red Dragon") or zhan chilong (斬赤龍, "decapitating the Red Dragon"), and identifies the adept as pregnant with an embryo of pure energy. Menstrual blood is sublimated into a "new blood" called the baifeng sui (白鳳髓, "white marrow of the phoenix"), which is refined into a higher level of spiritual power.

In traditional Chinese medicine, menstrual blood and seminal fluid represent the fundamental energies of women and men. The cessation of the menstrual flow in women structurally corresponds with the retention of the semen in men. In both cases, loss of an essential substance is stopped and with it, the loss of original energy. This cessation creates a reversal of the natural processes and allows the symbolic creation of a new internal sprout of energy that turns into an embryo of energy. According to traditional medical literature, menstrual blood is formed from maternal milk, which two days before menstruation, sinks down from the breasts into the uterus where it transforms into blood. The refinement of menstrual blood into energy is therefore a reversal of the natural process and consists of its returning to milky secretions. The process begins with breast massages to stimulate the internal fire of sexual desire, which is then controlled to nurture the inner being. Furthermore, the female adept uses breath meditation to transform menstrual blood back into breast secretions. A warm energy is felt rotating around her navel, the area heats up, and the "red is transformed into the white". According to the Nü jindan, "When yang is close to being transformed into yin and to flow out through the jade channel [vagina], quickly get on the wheel of fire. When the wind of the Xun blows in the upper part, in the original Scarlet Palace [solar plexus], decapitate the periodic flow of blood so that it can never run again!"

Texts on neidan practices affirm that since the internal movement of energies corresponds to the gestational capabilities already present in women, their spiritual progress with inner alchemy is consequently faster than that of men. While a male adept has to develop a womb inside himself and learn how to nurture an embryo in it, a woman already has this natural faculty and thus has an easier time learning the practice. He Lοngxiang's preface says, "In the case of women, we discuss breathing techniques but not embryonic practices".

=== Mediumistic activities ===
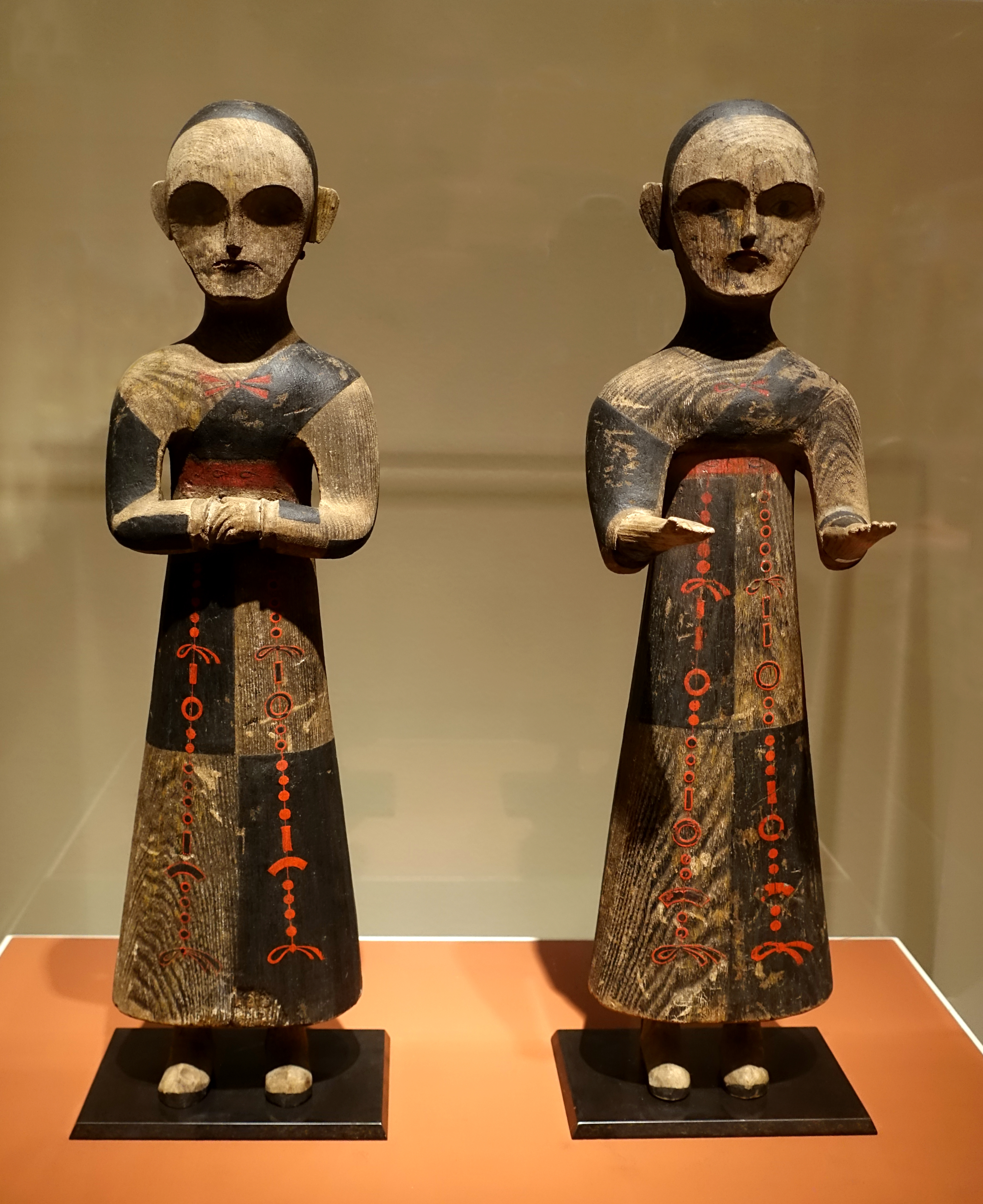
Pair of shamans or attendants, Chu culture, c. 3rd century BCE

Women played an important role in the long tradition of Chinese shamanism. The word wu (巫, "spirit medium; shaman; sorcerer; doctor") was first recorded during the Shang dynasty (ca. 1600–1046 BCE) when a wu could be either male or female. During the late Zhou dynasty (1045–256 BCE) wu specifically meant "female shaman; sorceress" as opposed to xi (覡, "male shaman; sorcerer"). Later names for shamanesses include nüwu (女巫, "woman shaman"), wunü (巫女, "shaman woman"), wupo (巫婆, "shaman old woman"), and wuyu (巫嫗, "shaman hag"). Shamans communicated with the divine world, serving as diviners, diagnosticians, healers, exorcists, and zhaohun summoners of souls. Early Taoist movements absorbed certain popular shamanistic practices, especially revealed texts and automatic writing, but also criticized shamans for heterodox practices and black magic.

Many Taoist texts were thought to have been revealed to mediums and shamans in states of spirit possession. An early example is the c. 2nd-century CE Taipingjing (Scripture of Great Peace) that describes itself as a tianshu (天書, "celestial book"). The Zhen'gao, which was allegedly revealed to the mystic Yang Xi in the 4th century, has strong shamanistic overtones. For instance, "If perfected and divine spirits descend into an impure person of the world, they are no longer acting or writing with their own feet and hands. As above and below are so far distant from each other, how can their traces [writings] be truly visible [to humans]?".

Mediumistic literature enthralled Chinese literati, and the Song authors Shen Kuo and Su Dongpo both described spirit-writing practices, especially those associated with the cult of the Zigu (紫姑, Purple Lady), the Toilet God. In the Tang period, she was the second wife of a man whose jealous first wife brutally mutilated her, and slowly burned her to death in the toilet. Since Zigu died on the fifteenth of the first lunar month, that became her feast day, when she would descend into entranced women followers and answer their questions. She was venerated as the protectress of women, and even the Jiajing Emperor (r. 1522–1566) had a special altar to Zigu.

Women had privileged positions in mediumistic circles and Taoism. Shamanic elements underlie traditions of both schools with female lineages and women's inner alchemical texts. When organized Taoism adapted the ancient practices of shamanesses, female Taoists took on important new roles and functions.

=== Sexual practices ===
The Taoist spectrum of sexual activities ranged widely across schools. Some stressed strict celibacy, others mystically married celestial partners, and still others practiced communal ritual intercourse.

In the early Tianshi movement, all community members were initiated into a religious life of strict moral control and ritual sex. Women in the movement played key organizational roles and were essential in the guodu (過度, "rites of passage") sexual initiation, which went back to ancient fangzhong shu (房中術, "bedchamber arts") longevity techniques, and to shamans' ecstatic unions with the divine. Best known is the sexual ritual of heqi (合氣, "harmonizing the energies"), during which community members, regardless of their marital affiliations, joined in formal intercourse. The rites took place in the oratorγ or jingshi (靜室, "chamber of tranquility") in the presence of a master and an instructor. The techniques involved visualization of bodily energies and ritualized body movements aligned with Chinese numerology and astrology. In contrast to the sensual bedchamber arts, the ritual sex of Tianshi adepts was believed to result in formation of the Immortal Embryo, which benefits themselves as well as contributed to greater universal harmony. Daoxuan's 644 Guang hongming ji (廣弘明集, "Expanded Collection on the Propagation and Clarification [of Buddhism]") says, "During the rituals held at new and full moon, Taoists attend on their preceptor in their private chambers. Feeling and intention are made akin, and men and women engage in joining together. They match their four eyes and two noses, above and below. They join their two mouths and two tongues, one with the other. Once then yin and yang have met intimately, essence and energy are exchanged freely. Thus, the rites of men and women are performed and the Tao of male and female is harmonized."

The Shangqing Clarity tradition takes an ambivalent position toward sexual practices, while not completely rejected, sexuality is considered a lesser technique unable to grant advanced levels of spiritual realization. This Taoist school contends, along with some other religions of the world, that an adept must practice sexual abstinence and chastity in order to see and hear deities. Although the basic theme of sexual union is preserved, it is transposed into imaginary interactions with the divine. As the Zhen'gao says: "When a perfected appears as a presence of light and one engages with him or her, then this is union with the light, love between two beings of light. Although they are then called husband and wife, they do not engage in marital relations". Shangqing adepts sought to transcend mundane sexual union and move into the invisible realm, through the mediation of celestial partners and divine marriages.

Daoist schools of neidan inner alchemy have two basic views on women and sexual union. First, retaining the semen during intercourse creates psycho-physiological transformations, which benefit both female and male adepts as equal partners. Second, practicing sexual abstinence emphasizes women's mediumistic abilities and results in autoeroticism, such as massaging her breasts. In both cases, the union's goal is the formation of an Immortal Embryo, the first sprout of the adept's spiritual rebirth.

Taoist literature describes the ideal sexual union as an even exchange of energies between partners, but some non-Taoist literature mentions a sort of "sexual vampirism" in which one partner selfishly tries to obtain energies at the other's expense. This practice, called caizhan (採戰, "plucking [of energy] in [amorous] combat"), usually benefited men but sometimes also women. For instance, the Queen Mother of the West attained Taoist immortality by nurturing her yin essence; legends say that she never had a husband, but liked to copulate with young boys. Taoism consistently described such practices as improper and heterodox, even though they were covertly practiced within certain Taoist sects.

=== Celibate and monastic life ===
Female Taoists who chose to become nuns typically lived in temples known as guan (觀) that began in the 5th to 6th centuries. Celibacy was associated with early Taoist schools. The reformer Kou Qianzhi (365–448), who probably influenced by the Buddhist model, established celibacy among the Northern Celestial Masters. Similarly, the Shangqing School emphasized that chastity was necessary for an adept to visualize deities. Although the Shangqing founder Tao Hongjing (456–536) was celibate, the Maoshan institutions that he directed provided housing for adepts of both sexes and their children.

Taoism has a long history of polemics over sexual abstinence. Some, such as Song Wenming (宋文明) of the early 6th century strongly recommended that all Taoists be celibate; others preferred family life, such as Li Bo (季播) who presented a memorial to the emperor in the early 7th century recommending that he not prohibit Taoist clergy from marrying.

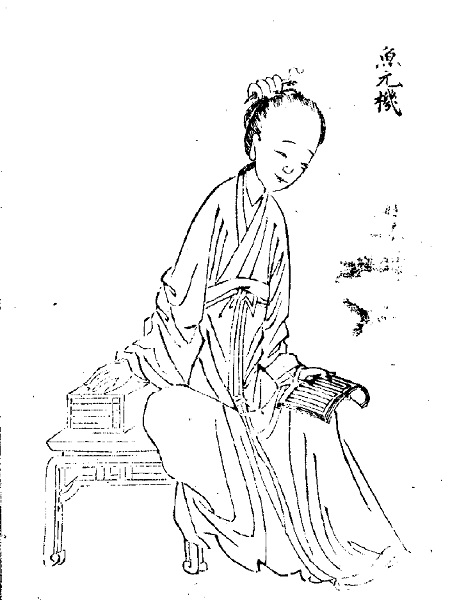
Woodblock illustration of Yu Xuanji, 1772 Lichao mingyuan shici (歷朝名媛詩詞)

As mentioned above, Taoist temples during the Tang period segregated women's and men's institutions. Promiscuity was prevalent in some Tang monasteries, for example, the Xianyi guan (咸宜觀, Abbey of Universal Benefit) in Chang'an. It was named after Princess Xianyi, the twenty-second daughter of Emperor Xuanzong, who became a Taoist nun and entered the abbey in 762. Many widows from wealthy families became Xianyi nuns, and continued living in luxury, aided by their servants. The nuns mingled with women from many social classes, such as the celebrated female poet Yu Xuanji (c. 844–869), who was born into a poor family and married a Tang official as his second wife. After denunciation by his first wife, she joined the abbey, took the poet Wen Tingyun (812–870) as her lover, and became renowned as a leader in Tang poetry.

Sex segregation in Taoist institutions became stricter under the Song. In 927, Emperor Taizu issued the following edict: "There are decadent tendencies in the temples, including wearing rough fabric and cohabitation with women and children. This is prohibited for all Taoist clergy. Those with family must live outside of the temple compound. From now on it shall be illegal to install someone as a Taoist clergy without proper official authority."

When the Quanzhen School spread throughout north China, they established many nunneries or guan especially for women, and supported those who had lost family support. Monastic life in Quanzhen temples for both sexes was strictly regulated, and the daily schedule included periods for chanting scriptures, community work, and individual practices, including inner alchemical exercises.

== See also ==
- Houtu
- Zhusheng Niangniang
- Bao Gu (4th-century)
- Gender and religion
- Women as theological figures
- Women in ancient and imperial China
- Women in Buddhism
- Women in China
- Women in Confucianism
