= Chinese spiritual world concepts =

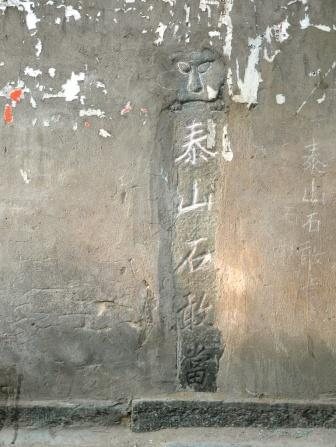
A Mount Tai stone tablet

Chinese spiritual world concepts are cultural practices or methods found in Chinese culture. Some fit in the realms of a particular religion, others do not. In general these concepts were uniquely evolved from the Chinese values of filial piety, tacit acknowledgment of the co-existence of the living and the deceased, and the belief in causality and reincarnation, with or without religious overtones.

== Practices and beliefs ==
- Ancestral worship (拜祖) – A practice to honor the deeds and memories of the deceased. This is an extension to the filial piety from the teachings of Confucius and Laozi. Elders, seniors, extended families and particularly parents are to be respected, heeded and looked after. Respects continue after their deaths. In addition to the Qingming and Chongyang festivals, descendants should pay tribute to ancestors during the Zhongyuanjie, more commonly known as the Ghost Festival ( but ghost festival is on Dongzhi "冬至") In addition to providing a tombstone or urn cover, descendants are traditionally expected to install an altar (神台) in their home to pay homage regularly each day with joss sticks and tea. The ancestors, including parents and grandparents, are worshipped or venerated as if they are still living.
- Three Realms (三曹) – the belief that Heaven, the living and the deceased exist side by side; heaven a place for saints or rested souls, hell for the criminous deceased. Three wun seven pak (三魂七魄) explains a person's existence. The three realms is where a person exists, and the seven states are what makes a person exist. The Pumi people, for example, are a supporter of this concept.
- Jian (間) – The living world where people exist in reality is referred to as Yang Jian (陽間). The underworld where spirits exist after death is regarded as Yin Jian (陰間), though this is not necessarily a negative place such as hell.
- Fan Tai Sui (犯太歲) – is when an individual faces major obstacles in health, job and studies. The obstacles last for a single Chinese calendar year. An example is when Hong Kong Feng shui master Raymond Lo tried to explain the occurrences in 2008 in relation to People's Republic of China leaders Hu Jintao and Wen Jiabao. Within the animal astrology the Horse clashes with the Rat, causing a turbulent year. Both Hu and Wen are born in 1942, the year of the Horse, which clashes with 2008 the year of the Rat. Hence 2008 in China was one of the most turbulent year with Tibetan unrest, Sichuan earthquake and many more events. Another example is Henry Tang suffering from Fan Tai shui in 2012 where he experienced the illegal basement controversy as well as many other events during the 2012 election. Tang would end up losing the election.
- Zung saang gei (種生基) – is when a piece of hair is placed in a particular fung shui location in an attempt to extend a person's life. A publicised example is Hong Kong actress Tina Leung who performed this practice in 1998 at a place near the Xingdao Lake (星島湖) in Beihai, Guangxi, China. The maximum that she could extend was 12 years. She died exactly 12 years later in 2010.

== Modes of communication ==
- Fuji (扶箕) – planchette writing is practiced using either a rattan sieve (see coscinomancy) or a wooden stylus to write Chinese characters in sand or incense ashes. This Chinese tradition of automatic writing continues to be practiced in Taoist temples in Hong Kong, Taiwan, and China.
- Mun mai (問米) – is communication directly with spirits who have died. The most common usage is for finding and contacting deceased relatives or loved ones. The general cultural term is that people are raised from the underground or down from heaven to communicate. A western comparison is likely seance or necromancy.
- Yum si lou (陰司路) – is the idea of flooding the spiritual road with spiritual money to ensure the person who died will reach their destination safely. In Chinese culture, the road to heaven, diyu or reincarnation may not be clear. By overloading the path with spiritual money, hopefully all troubled souls on the way will be too occupied with the money and leave the traveling-soul alone. This is an assurance for the living.
- Villain hitting (打小人) – is a folk sorcery popular in the Guangdong area of China and Hong Kong used for exorcising.
- Tong ling (通靈) – is to tunnel and channel through to communicate with spirits or Deities, Tangki in Minnan region will the best example.

== Figures ==
- Gui ren (貴人) – Someone who can help you, or is destined to help you.
- Xiao ren (小人) ("Siu yen" in Cantonese) – Someone who can hurt you, or is destined to hurt you. Simple methods such as kau cim can usually inform you whether a guiren or xiaoren is visible in your near future.

== Objects ==
- Peach wood sword (桃木劍) – the definitive weapon used for demon exorcism during Taoist exorcism. The ones from Long Mountain in Jiangxi province are particularly valued as the premium quality peach wood swords.
- Stone tablets (石敢當) – the tablets are placed at main doors, junctions of small avenues, three-way junctions, river banks or ponds to gather positive energy and ward off evil spirit. Sometimes it is used to block natural mishaps such as natural disasters.
- Tai mountain stone tablets (泰山石敢當) – the most powerful of the stone tablets are made from stones coming from Mount Tai. These stone tablets are shaped like the mountain forming the 5 fingers shape. The ones inscribed with (泰山石敢當) go with the legend of the fight between war deity Chi You and the Yellow Emperor. Supposedly goddess Nüwa dropped the tablet with the inscription on Chi You and scared him off. Yellow Emperor have since put the same inscription everywhere to scare off Chi You.
- Spirit tablet – a spiritual home in your house for ancestor spirits.

== Finance ==
- "Zhèng cái" ("Jing coi" in Cantonese) (正財) – This is basic money earned from working or jobs.
- "Hèng cái" ("Waang coi" in Cantonese) (橫財) – Is a type of destiny money that is earned usually in large sums. An old Chinese quote goes: "If it is yours, it is yours. If it is not yours, it is never going to be yours."
- "Pò cái dǎng zāi" ("Po coi dong zoi" in Cantonese) (破財擋災) – Is the process of losing a lot of money to avoid a disaster. Some people are advised to prepare to lose money in certain astrological years.

== See also ==
- Ghosts in Chinese culture
- Chinese ancestral worship
- Chinese folk religion
- Chinese ritual mastery traditions
- Chinese spirit possession
- Fengshen Yanyi
- Feng shui
- Fulu
- Chinese fortune telling
- Taoism
- Traditional Chinese star names
