= Chinese spirit possession =

Practice in Chinese folk religion

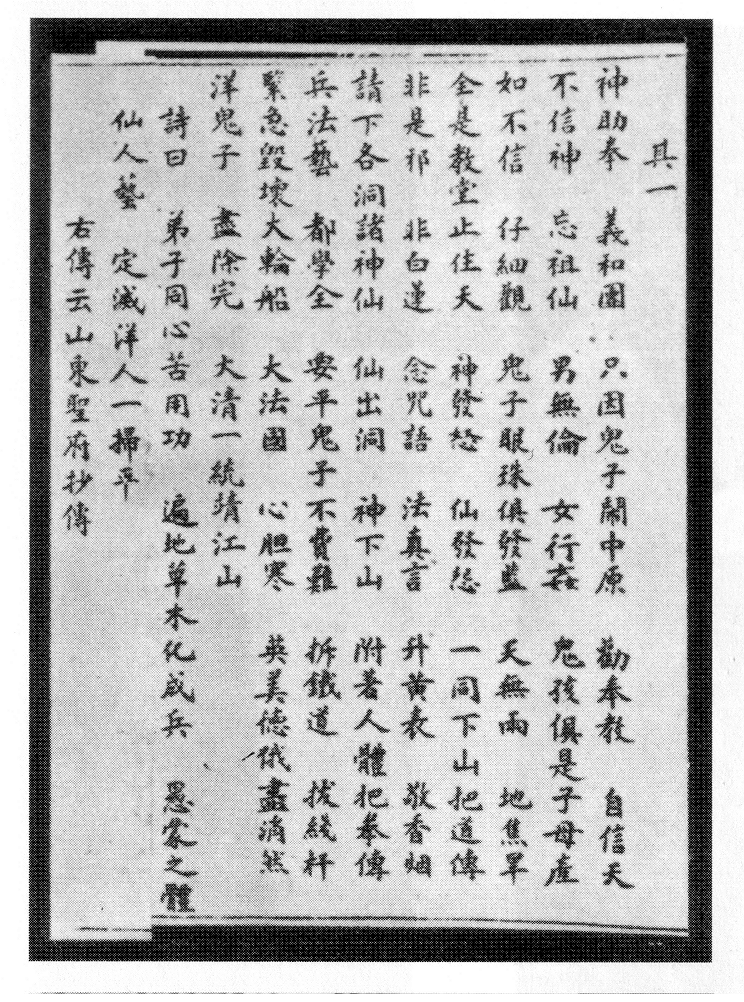
A Boxer Rebellion pamphlet making the claim that Boxers have divine powers

Chinese spirit possession is a practice performed by specialists across China and Taiwan, and encompasses a broad category of shamanism called jitong (a type of shaman) in Taiwan, or shentong in Wenzhou, involving the channeling of Chinese deities who are invited to take control of the specialist's body, resulting in noticeable changes in body functions and behaviour. The most famous Chinese spirit possession practitioners took part in the Boxer Rebellion in the 1900s, when boxers claimed to be invulnerable to the cut of a sharp knife, bullets, and cannon fire.

== History ==
The state of Qi had shamans who claimed to be possessed by gods, and they were criticized as heterodox by Confucians. Movements by shamans practicing spiritual possession often led peasant rebellions against the ruling dynasty during Chinese history. The Boxer Rebellion was one of many peasant movements led by shamans who claimed to be possessed by spirits. For the Boxers during the Boxer Rebellion, spirit possession was used for protective purposes.

Larry Clinton Thompson, in his book "William Scott Ament and the Boxer Rebellion: Heroism, Hubris and the "Ideal Missionary", has a description of the spirit possession practiced by Chinese boxers:

... whirling and twirling of swords, violent prostrations, and chanting incantations to Taoist and Buddhist spirits. When the spirit possession had been achieved, the boxers would obtain invulnerability and superhuman skills with swords and lance.

Spiritual possession practitioners during the Boxer Rebellion and 20th century warfare claimed that once these incantations were chanted, Chinese deities would descend to offer protection, so that cannon fire or gunshots would not harm the human body.

=== Spirit possession in the Song dynasty ===
Practices of spirit possession varied among Confucian, Buddhist, and Daoist tradition, and the three sects of belief were closely tied to Chinese societal hierarchy. Daoist priests and Buddhist monks who carried out possession rituals were at the top of the hierarchy, followed by a growing group of independent religious and ritual specialists such as lay Daoist exorcists (fashi) and Esoteric Buddhist monks. At the bottom were village spirit-mediums and rural practitioners.

Spirit possession was, as Edward Davis puts it, a "necessarily a social experience." Denoted by Song dynasty writers as "pingfu," it focuses on the experience of possession of a mortal body by ghosts, gods, or ancestors. In contrast to shamanism, the body or the self is not able to communicate with the entity that is possessing the body.

The Yijian Zhi by Hong Mai of the Southern Song dynasty contains almost two hundred accounts of spirit possession. The three main types of accounts included were of 1. village spirit mediums who were possessed by earthly spirits, 2. Child-mediums, employed by Daoist priests and Buddhist monks as a means of exorcism for the possessed, and 3. Funeral rites where relatives could be possessed by the deceased as a form of communication (4). There were also accounts of non-ritualized possession, where spirits were believed to take over a body and was treated as an illness.

=== Child mediums ===
Particularly active in the Jiangsu region during the Song Dynasty, the employment of young boys in ritual exorcist practices was common. One account of such is from Hong Mai's Yijian Zhi is the "Rites of the Three Altars." The ritual employs child mediums to identify and deal with malevolent spirits. In one instance, three boys are called upon to identify a water demon. The boys fall into a trance, during which they locate and capture the demon in the form of a large turtle. This practice is noted during a period of Daoist and local village medium convergence.

Another account from Hong Mai, "At the Home of an Extended Confucian Family in Zhejiang," documents the young nephew of a possessed woman being summoned to aid with the exorcism. The exorcist Zhao Shandao burned incense, danced the yubu, and asked the children to search for demonic images in the smoke. The nephew identified the spirit to be from a corpse in the village, which consequently was instructed to be burned. He witnessed the descent of a Daoist priest who gave him instructions on how to heal the woman.

=== Qing era ===
The Qing Code criminalized spirit possession, categorizing it as part of the "Ban on Vernacular Masters and Heretical Techniques".

=== Contemporary spirit possession ===
Spirit possession in China today is much more subdued in comparison to its role in history. In the beginning of the 20th century, the dominant ideology in China was that of a rational, scientific nation that revolved around the central government. Irrationality was then the opposition, which included practices such as shamanism, spirit possession, and "superstition." Religious activity was quelled under the Mao era, and only in post-Mao periods did shamanism resurface. Today, shamans are most prominently found in the coastal cultures of Fujian, Taiwan, Guangdong, and Hong Kong. In Wenzhou, most shamans are women and operate in their own homes because the practices are banned at temples. At the national or urban level, shamans could be fined, or even taken to jail if found practicing in public.

In Yueqing City, it was documented that village party leaders entered a contract with a shamaness where she would become possessed and communicate on behalf of people in the village. In exchange for letting her practice in the temple, she would give the equivalent of $75,000 USD to the local government out of her lucrative earnings. This was met with controversy, as some argued that the party leaders and the shamaness were colluding to cheat the money of locals. However, on a grassroots level in rural Wenzhou, people generally support and believe in shamans. They are seen as stimulants of the local economy and are beneficial to the community.

== Spirit possession and medicine ==
Patients with mental illnesses would often be brought to the temple, as mental illness was believed to be symptomatic of spirit possession. There are many accounts beginning from ancient times that detail people falling ill to possession, and subsequently were brought to receive Buddhist or Daoist exorcisms. In these cases, the individual's soul is not completely replaced by the possessor, but suppressed (压) such that it coexists in a lesser extent with the spirit.

At the temple, mediums would perform rituals and exorcisms as treatment for such. The mediums are expected to divinely know and diagnose the patient, and therefore do not ask many questions. Talismans and incantations are used to protect the patient from further harm, and were intended to keep the kwei (鬼), or spirits, away.

A study was carried out in 1993 that observed the illness behaviors of 100 Chinese psychiatric patients, which found that belief of spirit possession was not related to education status. More women than men believed in spirit possession. Traditional healers were often used alongside treatment in the hospital.

== See also ==
- Chinese spiritual world concepts
- Fuji (planchette writing)
- Tongji (spirit medium)
- Wu (shaman)
