= Chinese shamanism =

Chinese folk religion

Seal script

Great Seal script

Bronzeware script

Ideograms of wu 巫 in different ancient Chinese scripts.

Chinese shamanism, alternatively called Wuism (Chinese: 巫教; pinyin: wū jiào; lit. 'wu religion', 'shamanism', 'witchcraft'; alternatively 巫觋宗教 wū xí zōngjiào), refers to the shamanic religious tradition of China. Its features are especially connected to the ancient Neolithic cultures such as the Hongshan culture. Chinese shamanic traditions are intrinsic to Chinese folk religion.

Various ritual traditions are rooted in original Chinese shamanism: contemporary Chinese ritual masters are sometimes identified as wu by outsiders (Nadeau 2012, p. 140), though most orders do not self-identify as such. Also Taoism has some of its origins from Chinese shamanism: it developed around the pursuit of long life (shou 壽/寿), or the status of a xian (仙, "mountain man", "holy man").

== Meaning of wu ==
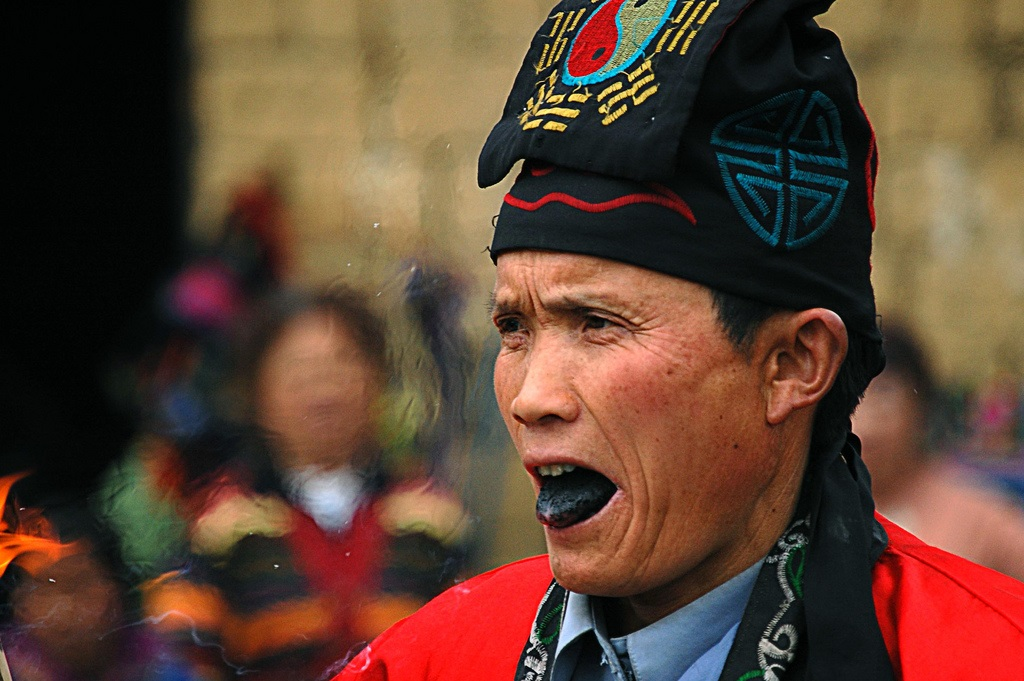
A wu (巫) master

The Chinese word wu 巫; 'shaman', 'wizard', indicating a person who can mediate with the powers generating things (the etymological meaning of "spirit", "god", or nomen agentis, virtus, energeia), was first recorded during the Shang dynasty (ca. 1600-1046 BCE), when a wu could be either sex. During the late Zhou dynasty (1045-256 BCE) wu was used to specify "female shaman; sorceress" as opposed to xi (覡; 'male shaman', 'sorcerer'), which first appears in the 4th century BCE Guoyu. Other sex-differentiated shaman names include nanwu (男巫) for "male shaman; sorcerer; wizard"; and nüwu (女巫), wunü (巫女), wupo (巫婆), and wuyu (巫嫗) for "female shaman; sorceress; witch".

The word tongji 童乩 (lit. "youth diviner") "shaman; spirit-medium" is a near-synonym of wu. Modern Chinese distinguishes native wu from "Siberian shaman": saman (薩滿) or saman (薩蠻); and from Indian Shramana "wandering monk; ascetic": shamen (沙門), sangmen (桑門), or sangmen (喪門).

Berthold Laufer (1917:370) proposed an etymological relation between Turkic bögü "shaman", Chinese bu, wu (shaman), buk, puk (to divine), and Tibetan aba (pronounced ba, sorcerer). Coblin (1986:107) puts forward a Sino-Tibetan root *mjaɣ "magician; sorcerer" for Chinese wu < mju < *mjag 巫 "magician; shaman" and Written Tibetan 'ba'-po "sorcerer" and 'ba'-mo "sorcereress" (of the Bön religion). Further connections are to the bu-mo priests of Zhuang Shigongism and the bi-mo priests of Bimoism, the Yi indigenous faith. Also Korean mu 무 (of Muism) is cognate to Chinese wu (巫). Schuessler lists some etymologies: wu could be cognate with wu (舞; 'to dance'); wu could also be cognate with mu (母; 'mother') since wu, as opposed to xi (覡), were typically female; wu could be a loanword from Iranian *maghu or *maguš "magi; magician", meaning an "able one; specialist in ritual". Mair (1990) provides archaeological and linguistic evidence that Chinese wu < *m^{y}ag (巫; 'shaman', 'witch', 'wizard', 'magician') was maybe a loanword from Old Persian *maguš "magician; magi". Mair connects the nearly identical Chinese Bronze script for wu and Western heraldic cross potent ☩, an ancient symbol of a magus or magician

== Terminology and Debates ==
The term “shamanism” does not originate in Chinese tradition but derives from the Evenki language in Siberia, which referred to a ritual practitioner šamán who mediates between the world of spirits and humans.

However, in ancient China, “shamanism” does not fully summarize things that happened in China. In the context of early China, the practices associated with wu (巫), which appeared since the Shang dynasty, are more commonly associated with the definition of “shamanism”. Nevertheless, wu has changed significantly across different dynasties. For example, in early China, wu could refer to ritual specialists involved in state ceremonies and communications with spirits. Over time, because of the change of social status and structures, this term incorporates more things than before, and it cannot be concluded as the narrower anthropological definition of a “shaman.”

Due to the evolving nature of wu, scholars have debated whether the term “shamanism” is an appropriate framework that can capture these Chinese traditions. Some argue that it can be used as a framework for understanding the ceremonies held in ancient China, but others challenge that “shamanism” is a term originating from the western world. Therefore, using this Western framework may obscure important historical and cultural unique values within China itself.

== Early history ==
The Chinese religion from the Shang dynasty onwards developed around ancestral worship. The main gods from this period are not forces of nature in the Sumerian way, but deified virtuous men. The ancestors of the emperors were called di (帝), and the greatest of them was called Shangdi (上帝, "the Highest Lord"). He is identified with the dragon (夔; Kui), symbol of the universal power (qi).

Cosmic powers dominate nature: the Sun, the Moon, stars, winds and clouds were considered informed by divine energies. The earth god is She (社) or Tu (土). The Shang period had two methods to enter in contact with divine ancestors: the first is the numinous-mystical wu (巫) practice, involving dances and trances; and the second is the method of the oracle bones, a rational way.

The Zhou dynasty, succeeding the Shang, was more rooted in an agricultural worldview. They opposed the ancestor-gods of the Shang, and gods of nature became dominant. The utmost power in this period was named Tian (天, "heaven"). With Di (地, "earth") he forms the whole cosmos in a complementary duality.

During the Shang and Zhou dynasties, ritual practices are often associated with political authority. For example, in Shang dynasty, people used oracle bone inscriptions and state-sponsored ceremonies. In these ritual practices, wu played an important role in mediating between the human and the world of spirits, acting within the framework of royal.

After the developments of the Shang and Zhou dynasties, the meaning of wu has changed significantly along with the rise of Confucian thought in the classical period. Previously, wu was closely associated with political authority and ritual practice; instead, as Confucianism became more influential in shaping ideology, including stating ecstatic rituals as disorderly, more structural and hierarchical system of ritual became more popular. Therefore, practices with wu were gradually marginalized and transformed as a part of popular religious traditions, though they continued to exist in local traditions.

The Chu kingdom (c. 1030 BC – 223 BC) of the Spring and Autumn period was particularly fond of wuist practices and rituals. This is reflected in their poetry, calligraphy, artworks and lacquerware, which often portrayed ethereal and mythological elements that are not otherwise found in the relics of other contemporary states.

== Qing period ==
The Manchu rulers of the Qing dynasty (1644–1912) introduced substantial elements of Tungusic shamanism to China. Hong Taiji (1592–1643) put shamanistic practices in the service of the state, notably by forbidding others to erect new shrines (tangse) for ritual purposes. In the 1620s and 1630s, the Qing ruler conducted shamanic sacrifices at the tangse of Mukden, the Qing capital. In 1644, as soon as the Qing seized Beijing to begin their conquest of China, they named it their new capital and erected an official shamanic shrine there. In the Beijing tangse and in the women's quarters of the Forbidden City, Qing emperors and professional shamans (usually women) conducted shamanic ceremonies until the abdication of the dynasty in 1912.

In 1747 the Qianlong Emperor (r. 1735–1796) commissioned the publication of a Shamanic Code to revive and regulate shamanic practices, which he feared were becoming lost. He had it distributed to Bannermen to guide their practice, but we know very little about the effect of this policy. Mongols and Han Chinese were forbidden to attend shamanic ceremonies. Partly because of their secret aspect, these rituals attracted the curiosity of Beijing dwellers and visitors to the Qing capital. French Jesuit Joseph-Marie Amiot published a study on the Shamanic Code, "Rituels des Tartares Mandchous déterminés et fixés par l'empereur comme chef de sa religion" (1773). In 1777 the Qianlong Emperor ordered the code translated into Chinese for inclusion in the Complete Library of the Four Treasuries. The Manchu version was printed in 1778, whereas the Chinese-language edition, titled Qinding Manzhou jishen jitian dianli (欽定滿洲祭神祭天典禮), was completed in 1780 or 1782. Even though this "Shamanic Code" did not fully unify shamanic practice among the Bannermen, it "helped systematize and reshape what had been a very fluid and diverse belief system".

== Shamanistic features in early Tibetan religion ==
Before Buddhism was introduced to Tibet, the Tibetan people had long believed in a primitive religious system combining nature and ancestor worship. This system, with typical shamanic characteristics, played an important role in the Tibetans' religious, political, and social life. In ancient Tibetans, priests who held religious positions were regarded as intermediaries with divine abilities and could communicate with natural spirits. Before establishing the Tibetan Empire, this quasi-shamanic belief almost monopolized the religious space in Tibet, especially in the plateau areas where agriculture was underdeveloped and the environment was harsh. People usually believed that disasters were punishments or warnings from heaven. Priests not only presided over folk ceremonies but also often accompanied the army in battles, performing divination, praying to gods, and other rituals to stabilize the morale of the army.

In the period when Tibetan Empire had not yet been fully Buddhistized, the Tibetan army would hold a grand prayer ceremony before going on an expedition. During the ceremony, the priests presided over the divination to ask for good and bad luck to pray for the gods to protect the victory of the war. They conveyed the will of the gods to the soldiers through drumming and dancing to strengthen their confidence in victory. In addition to spiritual motivation, priests would perform symbolic rituals to bless military equipment so that soldiers believed they were blessed by divine power to enhance their confidence in battle. Such rituals were recognized and respected by the Tibetan royal family and became a spiritual force that soldiers relied heavily on in their psychology and beliefs before the war.

In the 8th century AD, under the rule of the Tibetan king Trisong Detsen, Buddhism was officially supported by the Country and gradually became the dominant religion of the Tibetan dynasty. The previously dominant religious belief system, which incorporated many shamanic features, began to be suppressed and marginalized. In particular, although Bon is not a form of classical shamanism, it retains many features associated with shamanic traditions, such as summoning spirits, ritual healing, divination, and communication with supernatural forces. As a religion that inherited the shamanic elements of early Tibetan religion, Bon was also severely impacted by the rise of Buddhism. The court no longer recognized the legitimacy of the Bon priests, resulting in many Bon rituals and believers being forced to retreat to remote areas or forced to adapt to the new Buddhist framework in order to survive.

== Northeast shamanism ==
Shamanism is practiced in Northeast China and is considered different from those of central and southern Chinese folk religion, as it resulted from the interaction of Han religion with folk religion practices of other Tungusic people such as Manchu shamanism. The shaman would perform various ritual functions for groups of believers and local communities, such as moon drum dance and chūmǎxiān (出馬仙; 'riding for the immortals').

== Modern shamanism ==
Shamanism saw a decline due to Neo-Confucianism labeling it as untutored and disorderly. During Maoist China all religious practices disappeared from public spaces. While spirit mediums have begun reappearing (mostly in rural China) since the 1980s, they operate with a low profile, often working from their homes, relying on word of mouth to generate business, or in newly built temples under a Taoist Association membership card to be legitimate under the law. The term shamanism and the religion itself has been critiqued by Western scholars due to an unfair and limited comparison to more favored religions such as Christianity and other modern and more documented religions in Western society.

Spirit mediums are often viewed as scammers, and are frequently portrayed as such in television shows and comedies. Along with the focus on science, modern medicine, and material culture in China (which created serious doubt in spiritual practices), shamanism is viewed as an opposition to the modern focus of science and medicine in the pursuit of modernizing. The marginalization of shamanism is one of the reasons for it mostly being practiced in rural or less developed areas or in small towns, along with the lack of enforcement of anti-shamanism policies among authorities in rural areas (either because they believe in Shamanism themselves or "look the other way in concession to local beliefs"). Shamanistic practices today include controlling the weather, healing diseases modern medicine can not treat, exorcism of ghosts and demons, and seeing or divining the future.

Shamanism's decrease in popularity is not reflected in all areas. It still maintains popularity in many areas in southern China (such as in Chaoshan) and rural northern China. Taiwan (although Taiwan tried to ban shamanism, in the end only restricting it) still have many who openly practice without the stigma seen in parts of China. Chinese mediumship, which originated from Chinese shamanism, is widely practised in Chinese folk religion in Taiwan. Talismans and certain sorcery practices in Taoism also originated from Chinese shamanism.

== Types of Chinese Shamanism ==
One important category closely associated with “shamanism” is Han Chinese traditions in China. In Han Chinese traditions, ritual specialists usually participate in activities such as healing, divination, and mediating human and spirits. Though their roles have changed along with the meaning of wu changes, they form an important foundation for ritual practices that can be labeled as “shamanistic” in traditional Chinese context.

Spirit-medium practices, specifically tongji (童乩) are one type of Chinese Shamanism. For instance, these practices performed by entering trance states in order to act as intermediaries between deities and human communities, especially in temple contexts. In these ceremonies, tongji is possessed by particular gods who are able to give oracles, answer questions asked by the followers, and even guide them in different issues like health, luck, and family problems. The answers can also be written down by communicating with the deities using methods such as planchette writing (扶乩), emphasizing the fact that what is being conveyed comes from the gods and not the person conducting the practice. Though these performances include intentional self-injury, they strongly emphasize the supernatural power and the safety under this power.

In addition to Han Chinese traditions, there are many shamanistic practices in Chinese ethnic minority groups, such as Manchu and Mongolian traditions. These Chinese ethnic minority groups illustrate the diversity of Chinese Shamanism, since the procedure of their rituals are different to each other. These minority groups’ traditions involve distinct cosmologies, ritual techniques, and social roles. Some of them are even more closely related to the world definition of “shamanism”.

== See also ==
- Chinese folk religion
- Chinese ritual mastery traditions
- Daba
- Nuo folk religion
- Taoism

== Bibliography ==
- di Cosmo, Nicola (1999). "Manchu shamanic ceremonies at the Qing court". In McDermott, Joseph P. (ed.). State and Court Ritual in China. Cambridge University Press. pp. 352–398. ISBN 978-0-521-62157-1.
- DuBois, Thomas A. (2011). "Trends in Contemporary Research on Shamanism". Numen. 58 (1): 100–128. doi:10.1163/156852710X514339-2. JSTOR 23045924.
- Michael, Thomas (2015). "Shamanism Theory and the Early Chinese 'Wu'". Journal of the American Academy of Religion. 83 (3): 649–696. doi:10.1093/jaarel/lfv034. JSTOR 24488180.
- Eichhorn, Werner (1973). Die Religionen Chinas. Die Religionen der Menschheit. W. Kohlhammer. ISBN 978-3-17-216031-4.
- Libbrecht, Ulrich (2007). Within the Four Seas--: Introduction to Comparative Philosophy. Peeters Publishers. ISBN 978-90-429-1812-2.
- Nelson, Sarah M.; Matson, Rachel A.; Roberts, Rachel M.; Rock, Chris; Stencel, Robert E. (2006). Archaeoastronomical Evidence for Wuism at the Hongshan Site of Niuheliang. S2CID 6794721.
- Nadeau, Randall L., ed. (2012). The Wiley-Blackwell Companion to Chinese Religions. John Wiley & Sons. ISBN 978-1-4051-9031-2.
- Rawski, Evelyn S. (1998). The Last Emperors: A Social History of Qing Imperial Institutions. University of California Press. ISBN 978-0-520-92679-0.
- Waldau, Paul; Patton, Kimberley, eds. (2009). A Communion of Subjects: Animals in Religion, Science, and Ethics. Columbia University Press. ISBN 978-0-231-13643-3.
- Waley, Arthur (1955). The Nine Songs: a Study of Shamanism in Ancient China. London.
- Xing, Haiyan; Murray, Gerald (3 December 2018). "The Evolution of Chinese Shamanism: A Case Study from Northwest China". Religions. 9 (12): 397. doi:10.3390/rel9120397.
- Yang, Mayfair (6 May 2015). "Shamanism and Spirit Possession in Chinese Modernity: Some Preliminary Reflections on a Gendered Religiosity of the Body". Review of Religion and Chinese Society. 2 (1): 51–86. doi:10.1163/22143955-00201001.
- Zhang, Hong; Hriskos, Constantine (June 2003). "Contemporary Chinese Shamanism:The Reinvention of Tradition". Cultural Survival Quarterly Magazine. 27 (2).

Further

- Coblin, W. South (1986). A Sinologist's Handlist of Sino-Tibetan Lexical Comparisons. Steyler Verlag. ISBN 978-3-87787-208-6.
- Laufer, Berthold (1917). "Origin of the Word Shaman". American Anthropologist. 19 (3): 361–371. doi:10.1525/aa.1917.19.3.02a00020. JSTOR 660223.
- Mair, Victor H. (1990). "Old Sinitic *Mᵞag, Old Persian Maguš, and English 'Magician'". Early China. 15: 27–47. doi:10.1017/S0362502800004995. JSTOR 23351579. S2CID 192107986.
- Schuessler, Axel (2007). An Etymological Dictionary of Old Chinese. University of Hawaii Press.
