= Chinese ritual mastery traditions =

Chinese folk religious order

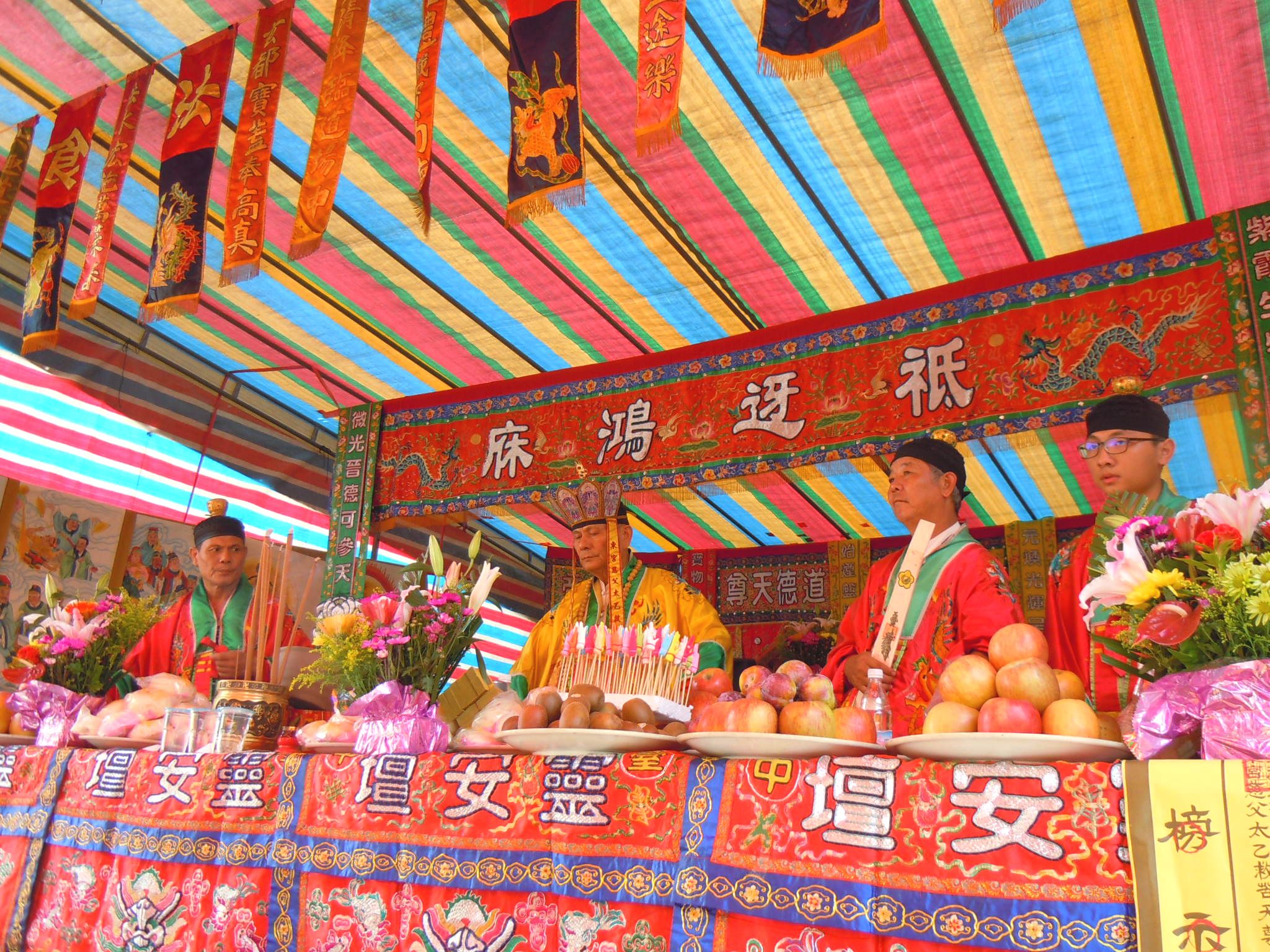
A fashi-led ceremony in Taichung, Taiwan

Chinese ritual mastery traditions, also referred to as ritual teachings (Chinese: 法教; pinyin: fǎjiào, sometimes rendered as "Faism"), Folk Taoism (民間道教; Mínjiàn Dàojiào), or Red Taoism (mostly in east China and Taiwan), constitute a large group of Chinese orders of ritual officers who operate within the Chinese folk religion but outside the institutions of official Taoism. The "masters of rites", the fashi (法師), are also known in east China as hongtou daoshi (紅頭道士), meaning "redhead" or "redhat" daoshi ("masters of the Tao"), contrasting with the wutou daoshi (烏頭道士), "blackhead" or "blackhat" priests, of Zhengyi Taoism who were historically ordained by the Celestial Master.

Zhengyi Taoism and Faism are often grouped together under the category of "daoshi and fashi ritual traditions" (道法二門道壇). Although the two types of priests have the same roles in Chinese society—in that they can marry and they perform rituals for communities' temples or private homes—Zhengyi daoshi emphasize their Taoist tradition, distinguished from the vernacular tradition of the fashi.

Ritual masters can be practitioners of tongji possession, healing, exorcism and jiao rituals (although historically they were excluded from performing the jiao liturgy). The only ones that are shamans (wu) are the fashi of the Lushan school. These Taoists are sometimes classified as “witches”, at times from more “orthodox” branches of religious Taoism.

== The fashi ==
Taijitu symbols are used also in ritual masters' traditions.

The ritual masters (法師 fashi) are defined, in opposition to formally ordained Taoist priests, as:

Lay practitioners beyond formal organisations whose lineages are vocational rather than hereditary. They live in the communities or among the families they serve or travel through villages and towns of the country, performing exorcisms, establishing protection, and effecting cures among the populace.

Michael Saso (University of Hawaiʻi at Mānoa) distinguishes fashi as "kataphatic" (of filling character) in opposition to Taoists as "kenotic" (of emptying character), and links them to other Sino-Tibetan indigenous religions:

resemble or make use of Taoist texts and visualisation, but are not truly Taoist; i.e., they are not kenotic or emptying in character, but rather kataphatic or filling with lesser spirits and local phenomena of nature. Though scholars and official Chinese sources often catalogue these practices as "Taoist", because they use Taoist texts, symbols and icons, in fact they are called by different names [...] Such practice can (but does not always) include what is called "redhead" or "redhat" (hung-tou) Taoism, the rituals of Yao, Miao, Na-hsi, Moso and Bon Tibetan practices, and the Ngapa or Ngawa rites of Tibetan conjurers in parts of Amdo [...] Though the mantra incantations and mudra hand symbols used by Taoist and popular religious experts are often similar if not identical, the goal and physical effect on the body are different. The Taoist sense of emptying kenosis and peace distinguish the traditional meditative system from the popular rites that summon violent spirits, exorcise evil demons, and attempt to control the elements such as wind, rain, hail, snow, and other forces of nature. Apophasis or "emptying" distinguishes the truly Taoist practice from the kataphatic or "filling" rites of the medium, shaman, oracle and popular priest.

They are known by different names throughout China, other popular ones being "ritual officers" (faguan) as they at times call themselves, or "redhead" Taoist priests (紅頭道士 hongtou daoshi). There are also localised names, such as "orthodox lords" (duangong), "altar masters" (zhangtanshi), or "earth masters" (tulaoshi) in Guizhou.

They are also in competition with other orders who perform similar services: monks and tantric masters under the auspices of Buddhism, and tongji medium.

The difference between ritual masters and Deities' mediums is that instead of being subject to territorial gods like the mediums, the ritual masters can marshal the powers of local Deities.

== Red Taoist orders ==
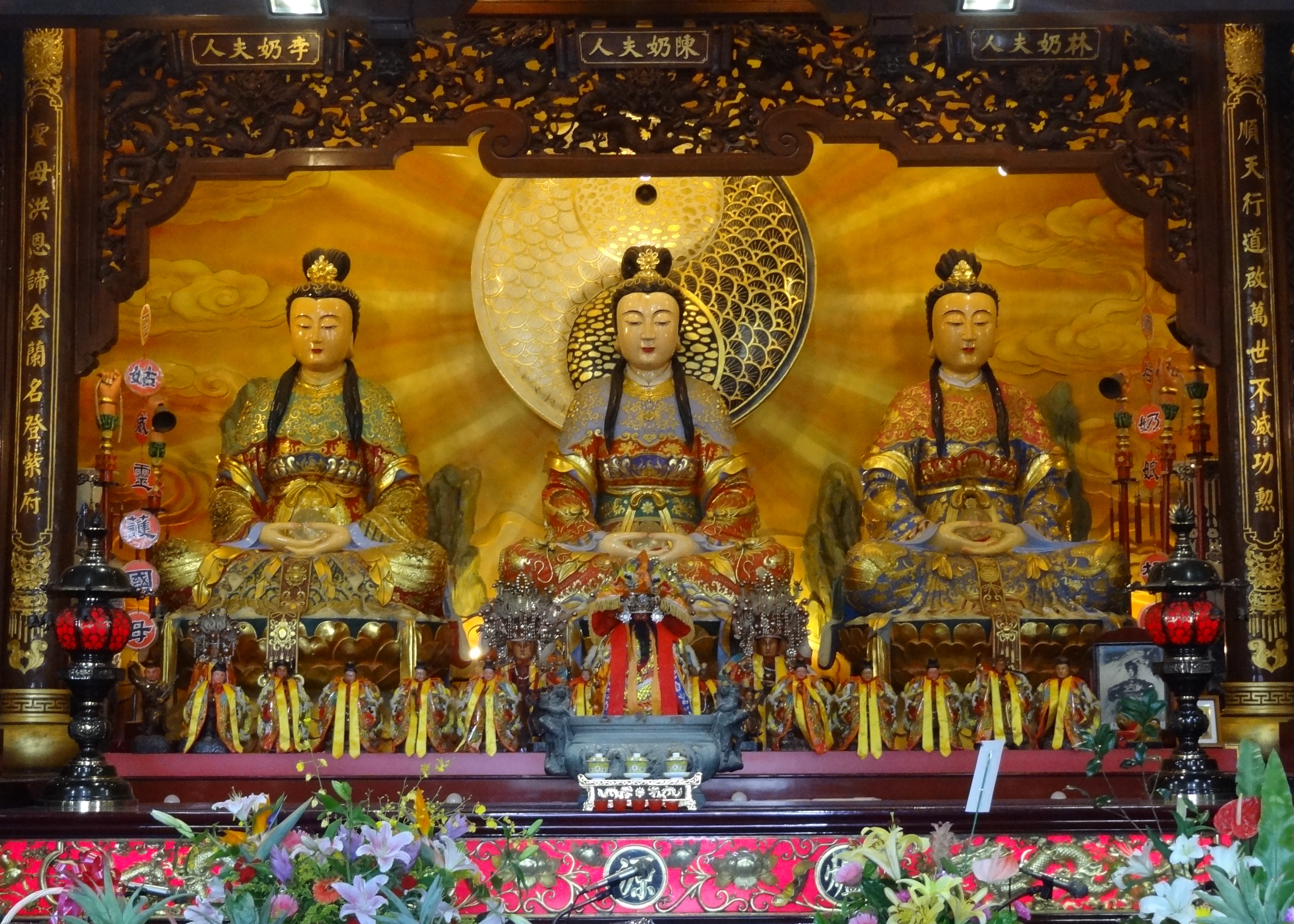
The Waterside Dame and her two attendants Lin Jiuniang and Li Sanniang, at the Temple of Heavenly Harmony of the Lushan school in Luodong, Yilan, Taiwan

=== Lushan school ===
The Lushan (Mount Lu) school (閭山派; Lǘshān pài, also 閭山教; Lǘshān jiào or 閭山法教; Lǘshān fǎjiào), also known as Sannai school (三奶教; Sānnǎi jiào; 'transmission of the Three Ladies'), is present in Fujian, southern Zhejiang and Taiwan. It is very active nowadays, and is related to the worship of the goddess Chen Jinggu ("Young Quiet Lady") the Waterside Dame (临水夫人 Línshuǐ Fūrén), who is very popular in the same area. It is also related to the cult of Wang Laomu, and competing with Maoshan Taoism.

The tradition shows similarities with Yao and Zhuang ritual traditions, and has incorporated elements of Tantra, such as the use of mudra and vajra. Lushan fashi perform rituals as the head of celestial troops while invoking the "Three Ladies" (sannai): Chen Jinggu and her two disciples, Lin Jiuniang and Li Sanniang. Although Lushan fashi are men, in performance they wear the ritual red skirt of Chen Jinggu and a crown or headdress with the words "Three Ladies" painted on it. Lushan fashi also practice a shamanic voyage rite called "crossing the roads and the passes" (guo luguan).

=== Pu'an school ===
The Pu'an school (普唵派; Pǔǎn pài) is present in west-central Fujian, southern Jiangxi and Taiwan. The historical figure of the Buddhist monk Pu’an is worshipped by the practitioners as their "founding master" (zushi). Their texts, rituals and iconography incorporate Tantric themes adapted in a Taoist style, and have elements of the Zhengyi and Lushan traditions.

=== Xujia school ===
The Xujia school (徐甲派; Xújiǎ pài) is another form of ritual masters.

== Northern orders ==
- Yuehu 樂戶
- Zhuli 主禮
- Shenjia 神家, families of hereditary specialists of gods and rites
- Yinyang masters or fengshui masters, using the Lingbao scriptural tradition

== See also ==
- Confucianism
- Fuji (planchette writing)
- Nuo folk religion
- Dajiao
- Taoist schools
- Yao folk religion
