= Tongji (spirit medium) =

Chinese folk religious practitioner

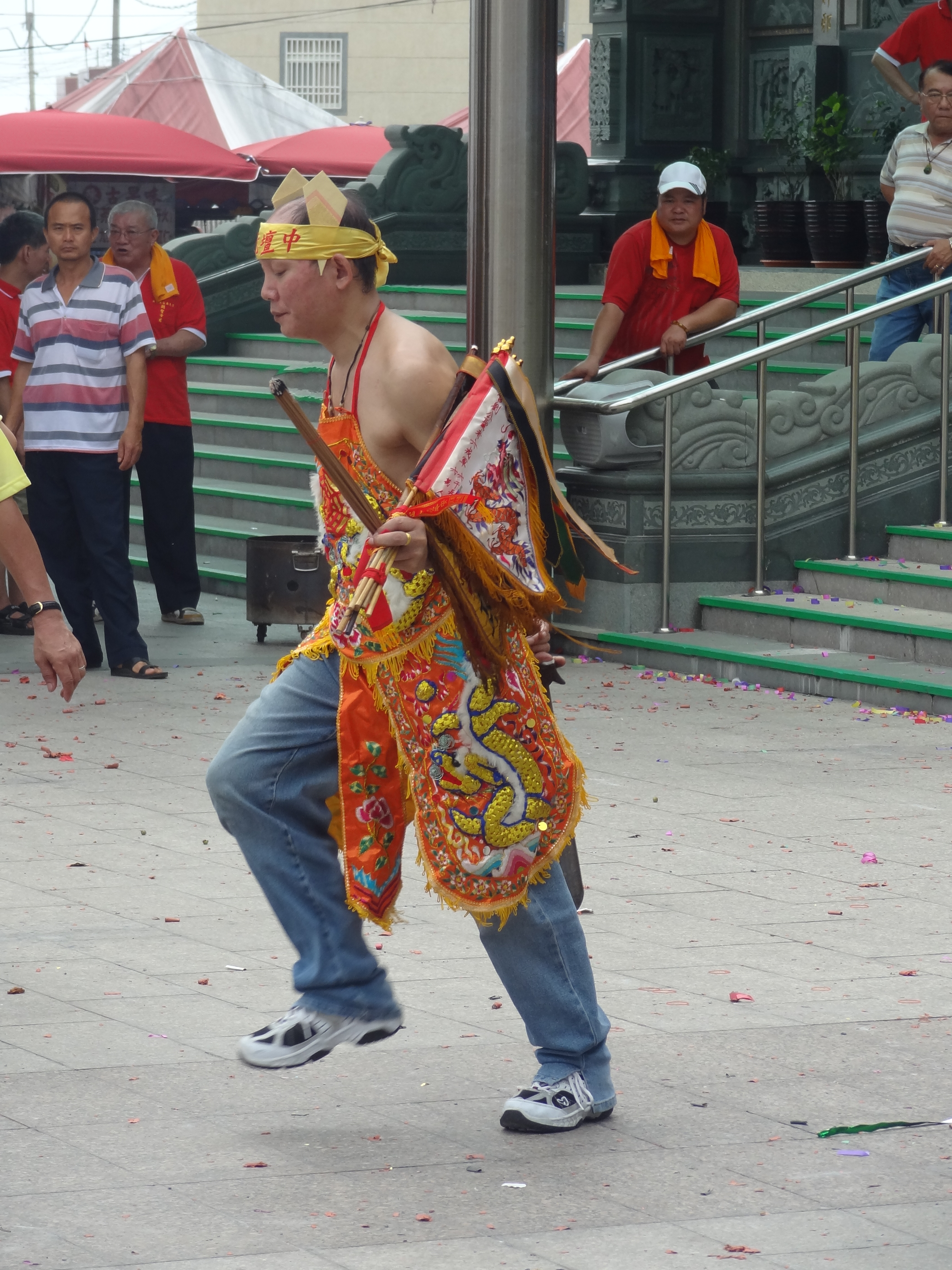
A tongji at a temple religious ceremony in Taiwan.

Chinese characters for tongji

Tongji (Chinese: 童乩; pinyin: tóngjī; Wade–Giles: t'ung-chi; lit. 'youth diviner'; Tâi-lô: tâng-ki) or Jitong (Chinese: 乩童; pinyin: jītóng; Wade–Giles: chi-t'ung; lit. 'divining youth') is a Chinese folk religious practitioner, usually translated as a "spirit medium", "oracle", or "shaman".

Tong (Vietnamese: ʔdoŋ; Mon: doŋ) has an Austroasiatic substrate which means 'to dance under daemonic possession' is represented phonologically by the character 童 "child; youth; boy servant" and ji 乩 means "to divine" (cf. fuji 扶乩 "divination; planchette writing"). Regional variants include Hokkien tâng-ki 童乩 and Cantonese gei-tung 乩童 or san-daa 神打.

A tongji or jitong is a person believed to have been chosen by a particular shen (Chinese deity) or spirit as the earthly vehicle for divine expression. The Chinese differentiate a wu 巫 "shaman; healer; spirit medium" who gains control of forces in the spirit world versus a tongji who appears to be entirely under the control of forces in the spirit world.

== External links and references ==
- Andersen, Poul. 2008. "Tâng-ki (or jitong) 童乩 (or 乩童) spirit-medium", in The Encyclopedia of Taoism, ed. by Fabrizio Pregadio, pp. 964–966. Routledge.
- Elliott, Alan J. A. 1955. Chinese Spirit Medium Cults in Singapore. Monographs on Social Anthropology, No. 14. Department of Anthropology, London School of Economics and Political Science.
- Groot, Jan Jakob Maria. 1892–1910. The Religious System of China: Its Ancient Forms, Evolution, History and Present Aspect, Manners, Customs and Social Institutions Connected Therewith. 6 volumes. Brill Publishers.
- Jordan, David K. 1976. "A Medium's First Trance", Anthropology: Perspective on Humanity, ed. by Marc J. Swartz and David K. Jordan. John Wiley & Sons.
- Jordan, David K. 1977. "How to Become a Chinese Spirit Medium".
- Jordan, David K. 1999. Gods, Ghosts, & Ancestors: Folk Religion in a Taiwanese village. 3rd edition. Department of Anthropology, UCSD.
- Myers, John T. 1974. A Chinese Spirit-medium Temple in Kwun Tong: A Preliminary Report. Social Research Centre, Chinese University of Hong Kong.
- Myers, John T. 1975. "A Hong Kong Spirit-medium Temple", Journal of the Hong Kong Branch of the Royal Asiatic Society 15:16-27.
