= Liu Jun (painter) =

Chinese landscape and human figure painter

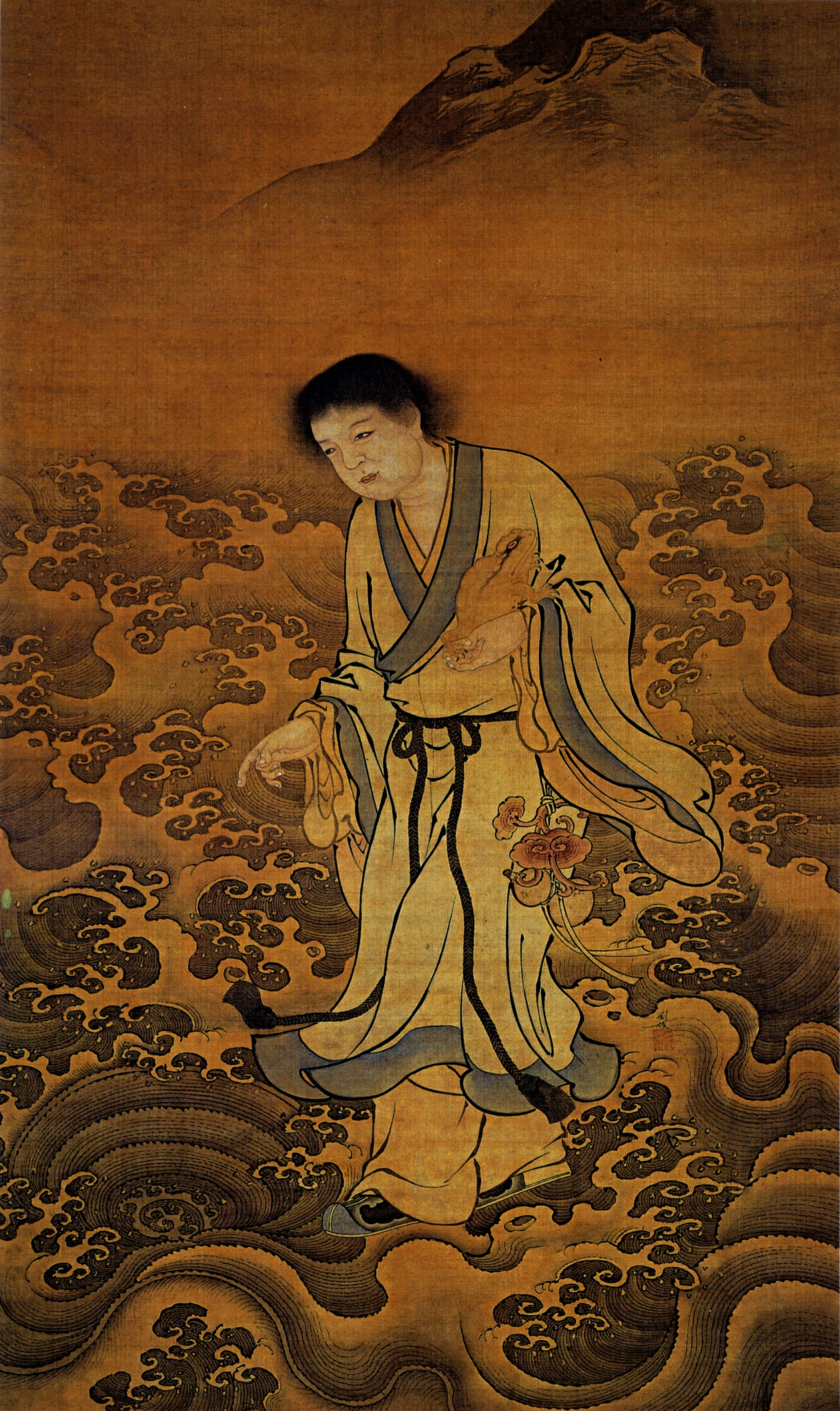
Liu Jun, Liu Hai and Chan Chu, Shijiazhuang Culture Museum

Liu Jun (simplified Chinese: 刘俊; traditional Chinese: 劉俊; pinyin: Liú Jùn; Wade–Giles: Liu Chün), courtesy name Ting Wei (廷偉), was a Chinese landscape and human figure painter in the early Ming dynasty. His birth and death years are not known.

== Notes ==
- Zhongguo gu dai shu hua jian ding zu (中国古代书画鑑定组). 2000. Zhongguo hui hua quan ji (中国绘画全集). Zhongguo mei shu fen lei quan ji. Beijing: Wen wu chu ban she. Volume 10.

https://collectionapi.metmuseum.org/api/collection/v1/iiif/39552/146630/main-image
