= Soga Shōhaku =

Japanese painter (1730–1781)

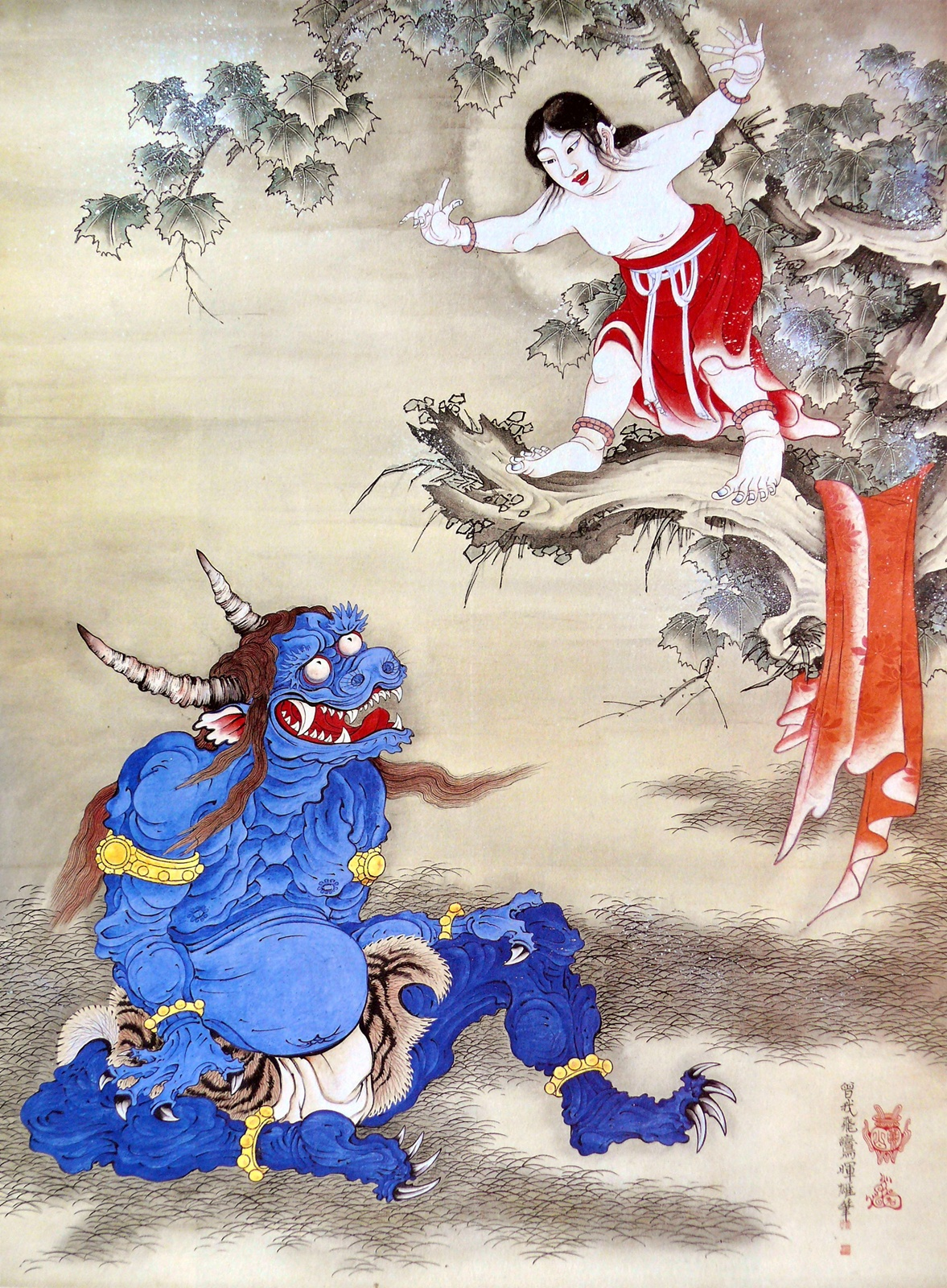
- Sessen Dōji-zu (Mie Prefectural Art Museum)
- Born: Miura Sakonjirō; 1730; Ise or Kyōto
- Died: January 30, 1781 (aged 50-51); Kyōto
- Occupation: Painter

Soga Shōhaku (曾我 蕭白; 1730 – January 30, 1781) was a Japanese painter of the Edo period. Shōhaku distinguished himself from his contemporaries by preferring the brush style of the Muromachi period, an aesthetic that was already passé 150 years before his birth. His monstrous depictions of prominent figures were extremely unusual compared to other painters of his time.

== Biography ==
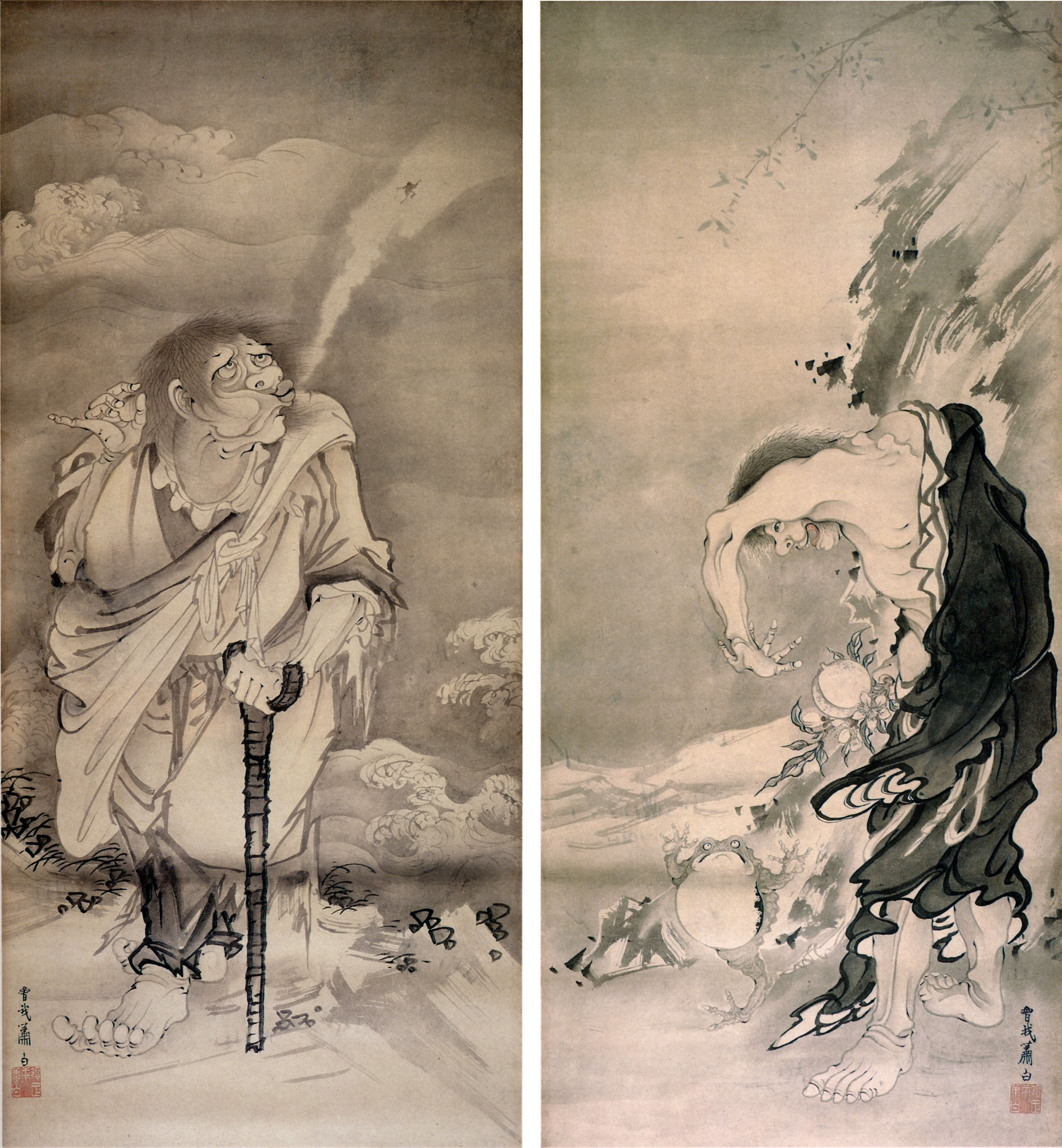
The Daoist Immortal: Li Tieguai and Liu Haichan (Museum of Fine Arts Boston)

Miura Sakonjirō was born in 1730, into a merchant family, as the second son of Miura Kichiemon and his wife Yotsu. His family was wealthy, but all of his immediate family members died before he reached the age of 18.

He became a painter in his late 20s, and studied under Takada Keiho of the prominent Kanō School, which drew upon Chinese techniques and subject matters. It is recorded that he studied the painting methods of the Soga School and the Unkoku School, which his actual artwork reflects.

He produced many paintings during his travel to Ise Province. He was also active in Harima Province.

His disillusionment with the Kanō School led him to appreciate the works of Muromachi period painter Soga Jasoku. He began to use the earlier style of brushstroke, painting mostly monochromes, despite the fact it had become unfashionable.

Soga was known for his monstrous expressions and paintings depicting Zen Buddhist saints and renowned writers as vulgar characters, which was extremely unusual in his time. Considering he was friends with many Confucian and Zen scholars including Matsunami Teisai, Yangmingism of the late Ming dynasty, which valued the spirit of "strangeness" and "madness," is considered to have influenced his art.

Having settled down in Kyoto in his later years after having traveled across the country, Soga's later paintings are marked with a distinctly softer approach compared to his bizarre and unorthodox style that marked most of his artistic career.

== Works ==
His work is held in the permanent collections of several museums worldwide, including the Brooklyn Museum, the Metropolitan Museum of Art, the Philadelphia Museum of Art, the Princeton University Art Museum, the Minneapolis Institute of Art, the Art Institute of Chicago, the Los Angeles County Museum of Art, the Indianapolis Museum of Art, the Birmingham Museum of Art, the Walters Art Museum, the British Museum, the Harvard Art Museums, the Dallas Museum of Art, and the Tokyo Fuji Art Museum.

== Gallery ==
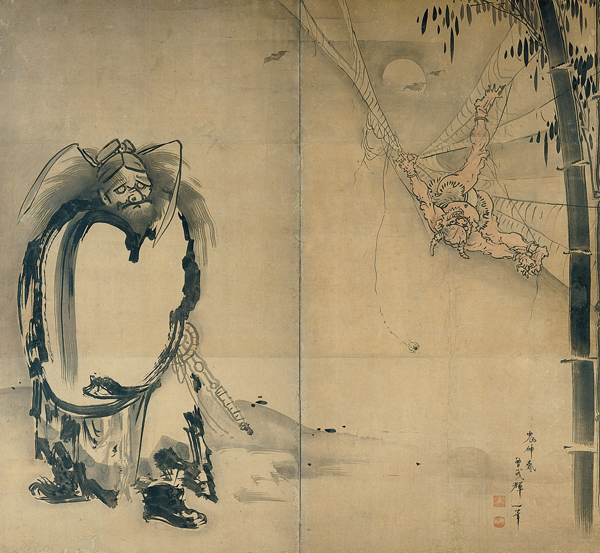
Shoki Ensnaring a Demon in a Spider Web (Ink on papered folding screen, photograph by Kimbell Art Museum)

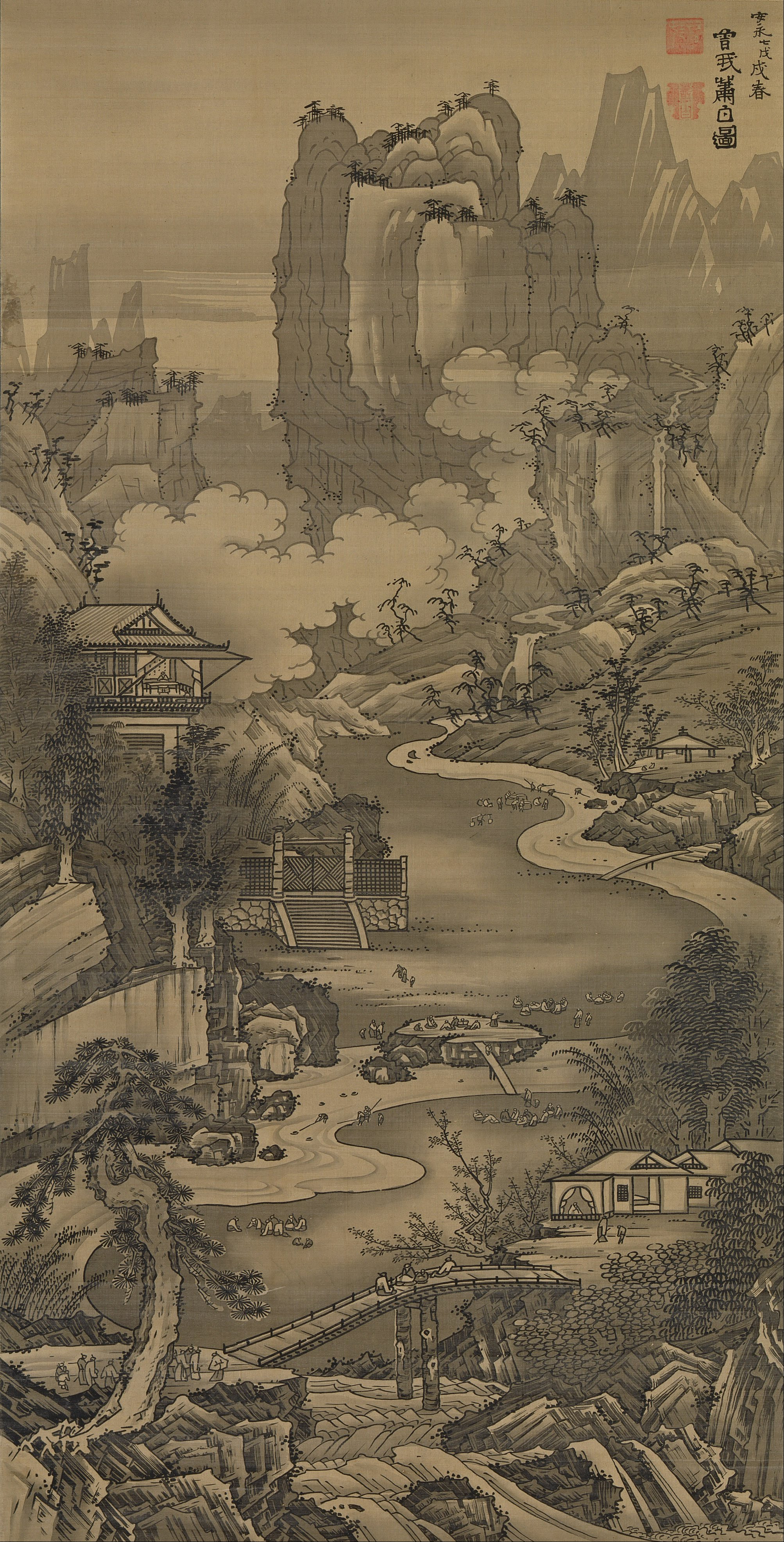
Orchid pavilion gathering (National Gallery of Victoria)

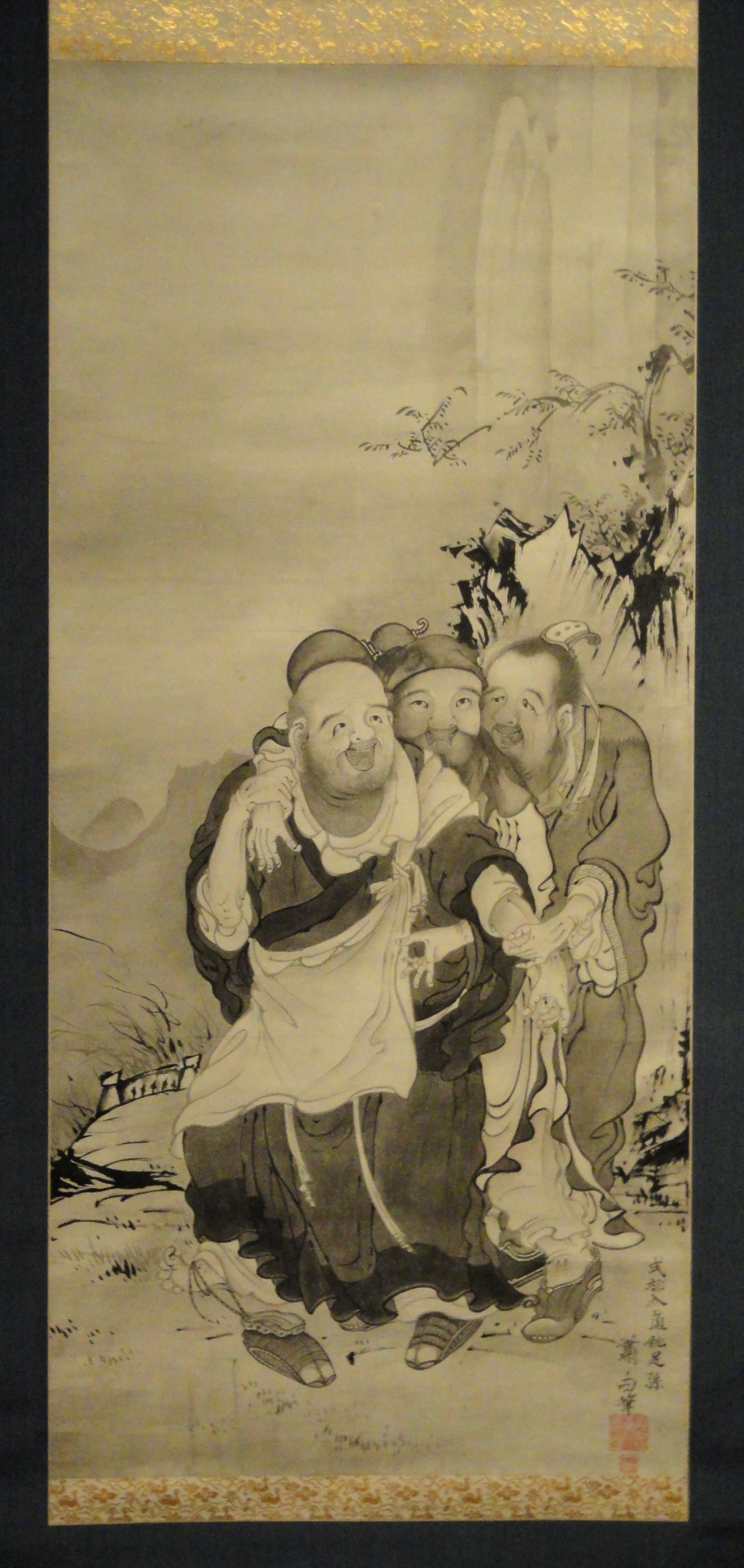
The Three Laughers of Tiger Ravine (Indianapolis Museum of Art)

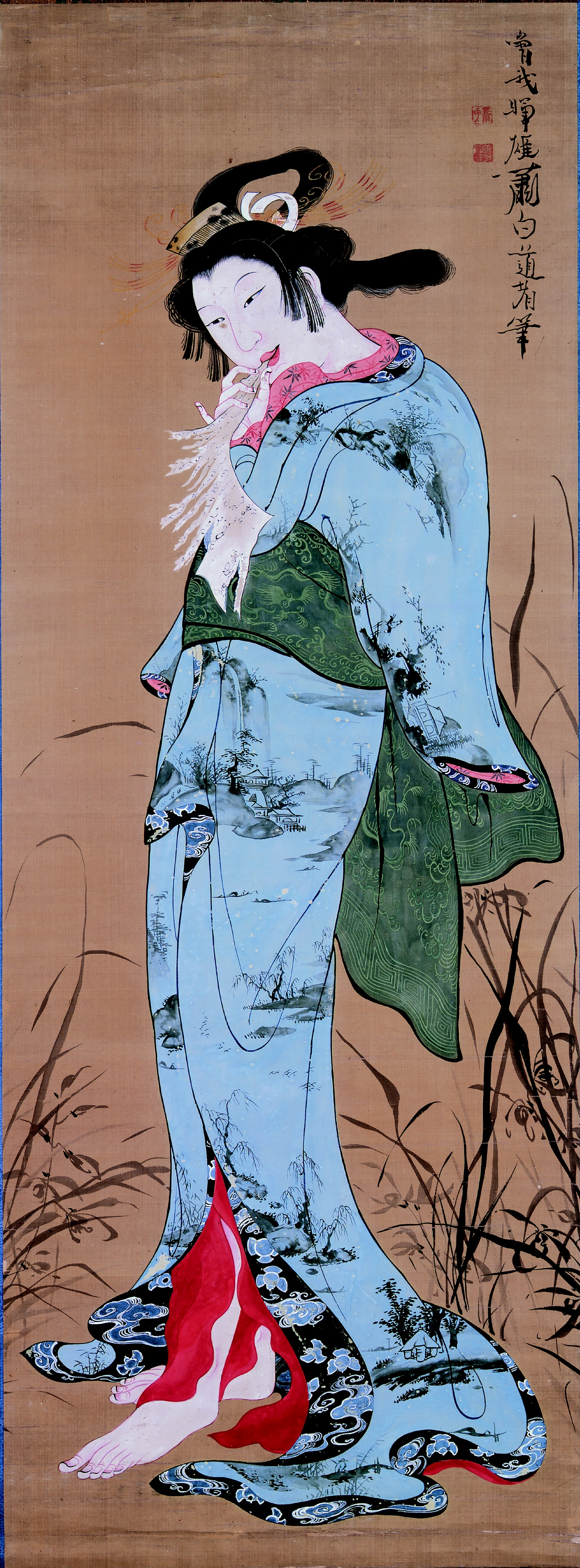
Beauty (Nara Prefectural Museum of Art)
