= DEmo (artist) =

Sculptor from Spain

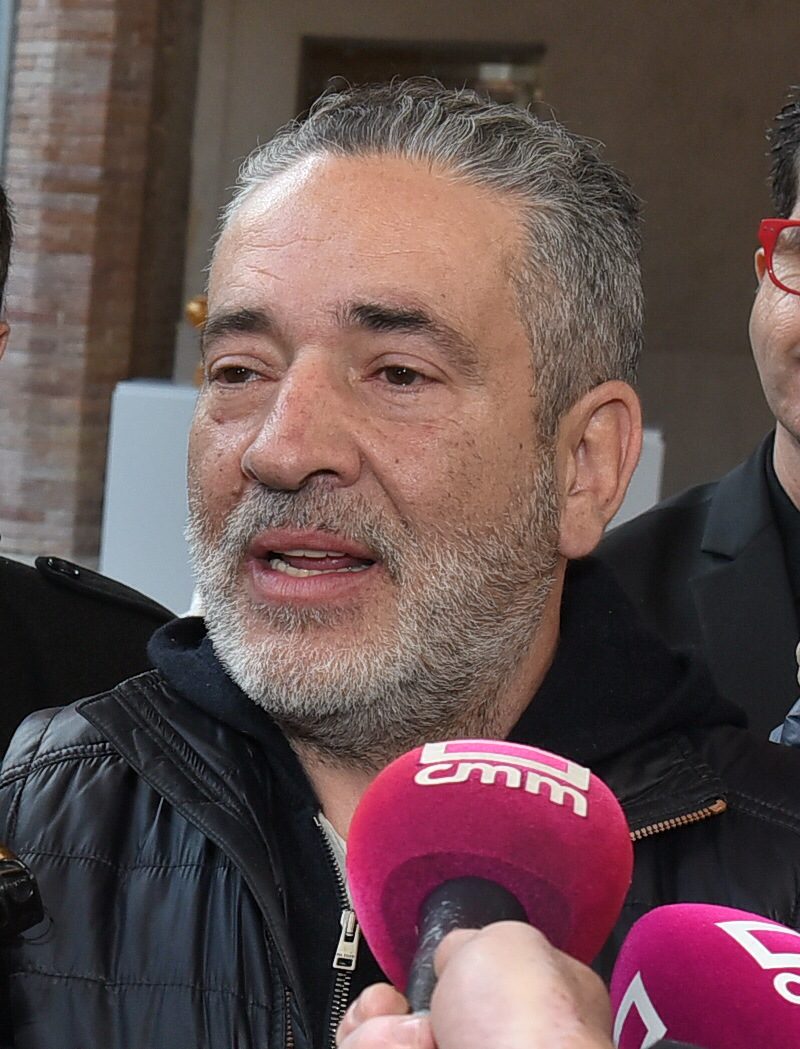
dEmo in 2019

Eladio de Mora-Granados (born 1960), known artistically as dEmo, is a Spanish artist. He is known for his large and colourful sculptures that resemble toys.

== Biography ==
dEmo was born in Mora in the Province of Toledo. A property developer by profession, he is active in creating and collecting art. In nine years from starting his collection in 1995, he had acquired 400 works of art. The most expensive was a sculpture by Fernando Botero for 36 million Spanish pesetas (over €200,000).

Often using plastic, polyester or resin, dEmo's works are brightly coloured and show repetition, such as his sculptures of gummy bears which have been installed at various locations. In 2007, 40 of these two-metre sculptures were placed on a new main boulevard in Logroño, La Rioja, with two 75-centimetre copies to be placed on the city hall.

dEmo was commissioned in 2009 by the city council of Leganés in the Community of Madrid to build Nensi, el Monstruo de Leganés. The sculpture, a pun on the name of the city, depicts a Loch Ness monster and her baby in a fountain. Unlike his other works, he did not replicate the sculpture, and used mosaic tiles to make it blend with a nearby park. dEmo's Lucky Frog bronze sculpture was unveiled outside the Casino Gran Madrid in 2014, to thank the capital city's local government for reinstating gambling after a 90-year prohibition.

In 2016, he was chosen to design the trophies for the Miami Fashion Week film awards. The trophies take the design of a Tequesta native. He has also designed trophies for COCEF, the Official Chamber of Commerce of Spain in France, taking the form of a rooster.

dEmo lives in Getafe in the Community of Madrid, and has exhibited his sculptures from the city hall. One of his trademark bears, in blue and with wings, became the mascot of football team Getafe CF in 2012.

== Selected works ==
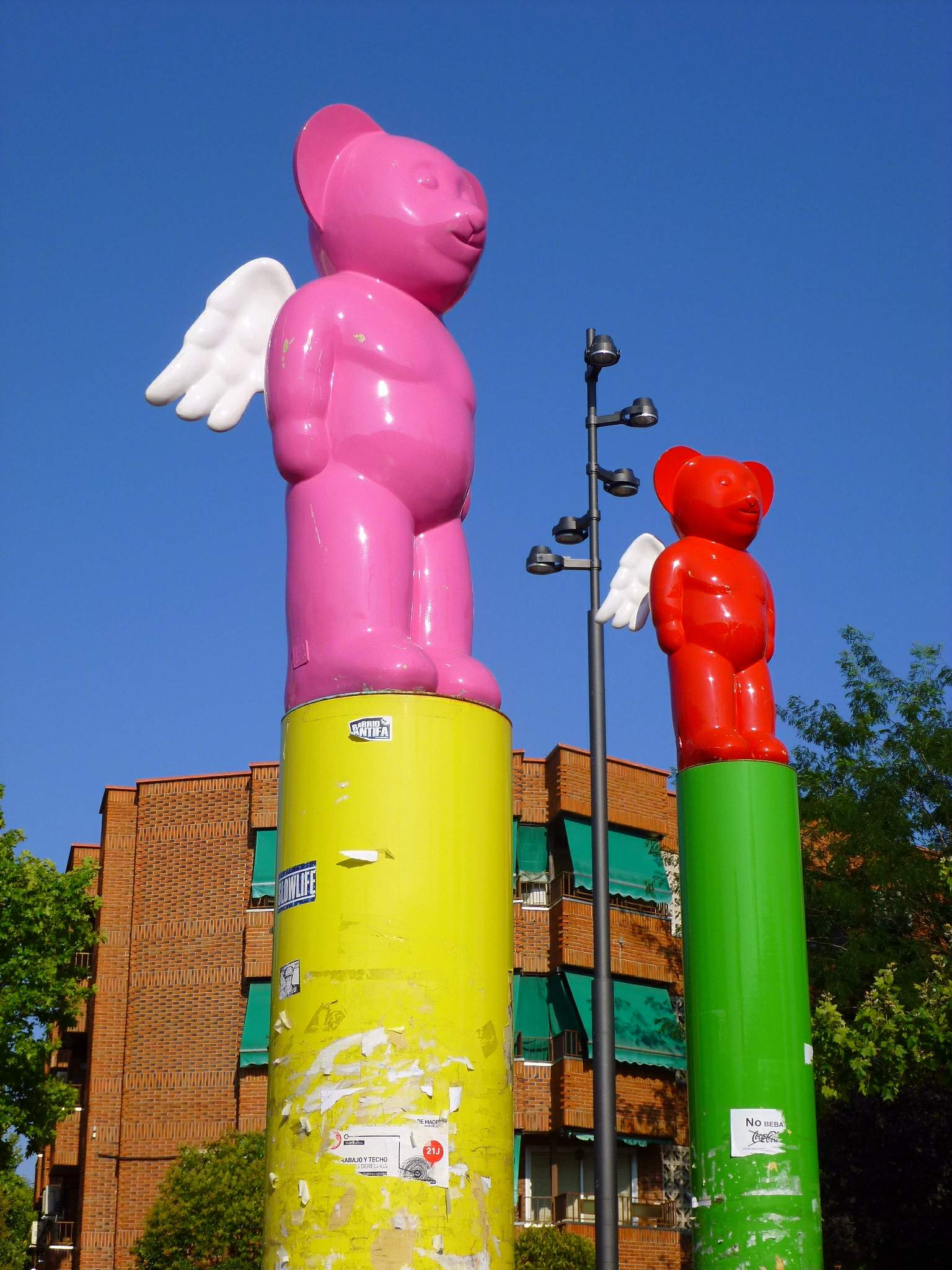
Bears in Getafe

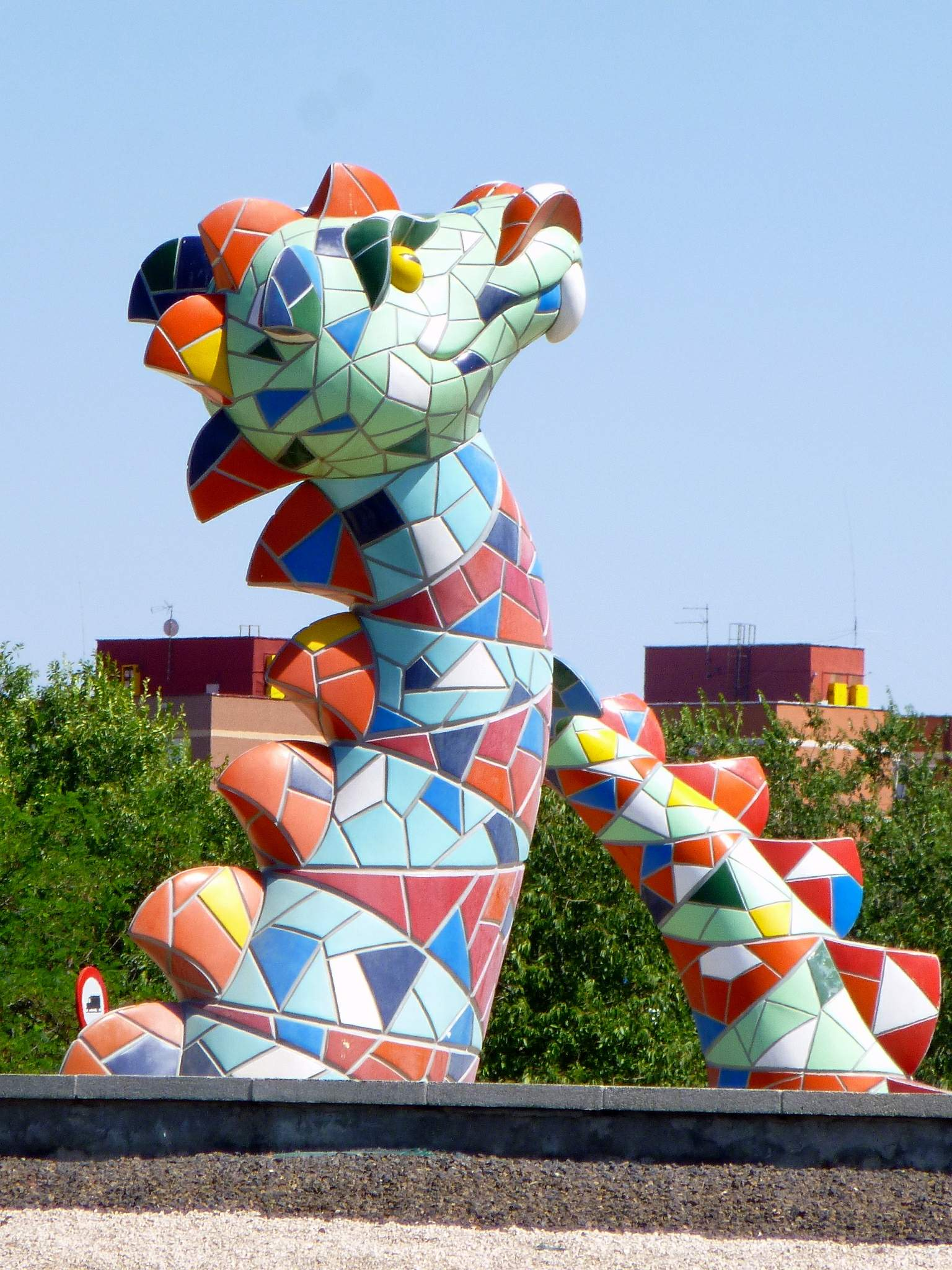
Nensi, el Monstruo de Leganés, Leganés

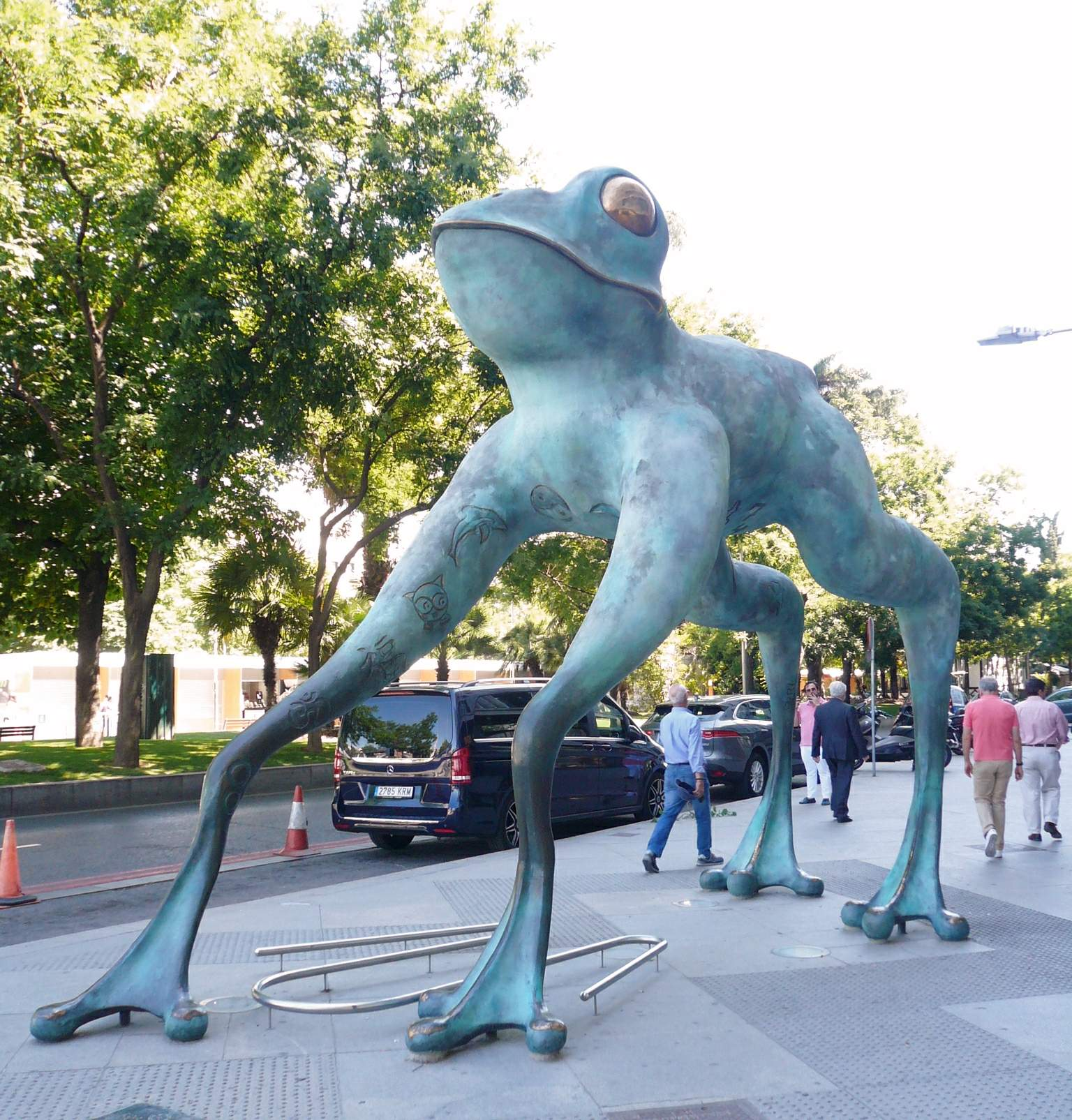
Lucky Frog, Madrid
