= Nensi, el Monstruo de Leganés =

2009 sculpture by dEmo

Nensi, el Monstruo de Leganés is a sculpture by Spanish sculptor dEmo, installed on a traffic roundabout in Leganés in the Community of Madrid. The sculpture is a play on the Loch Ness Monster, known in Spanish as El monstruo de Lago Ness, which sounds similar to El monstruo de Leganés.

== Background ==
In August 1994, the city council of Leganés introduced Nensi as a mascot for the city and distributed 16,000 stickers for membership of its fan club. The monster character has appeared in comics produced by the city council. In August 2002, sculptor Miguel Piñar produced a 1,000 kg metal sculpture based on the character, resembling a dragon and installed at a roundabout.

== Description ==
A kidney-shaped fountain is situated on the roundabout. Two monsters are depicted, a mother and baby, as dEmo considered it to look too empty with one. The mother consists of three parts, the head, body and tail, and the baby consists of head and tail parts.

dEmo often exhibits his work outside. Unlike some of his previous sculptures, he did not replicate the model, and gave the sculpture mosaic tiles to fit in with a nearby park. After six months of work, the sculpture was unveiled on 26 May 2009. dEmo said that all the parties of Leganés's city council approved of the project, finding it amusing, and were seeking a twinning with Inverness to cement the connection to Loch Ness.

== Reception ==
Carlos Marcote wrote in El Periódico de Catalunya in 2016 that Leganés was the only city in the world to build a monument based on a joke. The sculpture was listed among the ten "most eccentric of ugly" in the Community of Madrid by 20 minutos in 2021. In 2026, El Confidencial considered the sculpture to be a must-see for visitors to Leganés.
