= Money tree (myth) =

Chinese myth

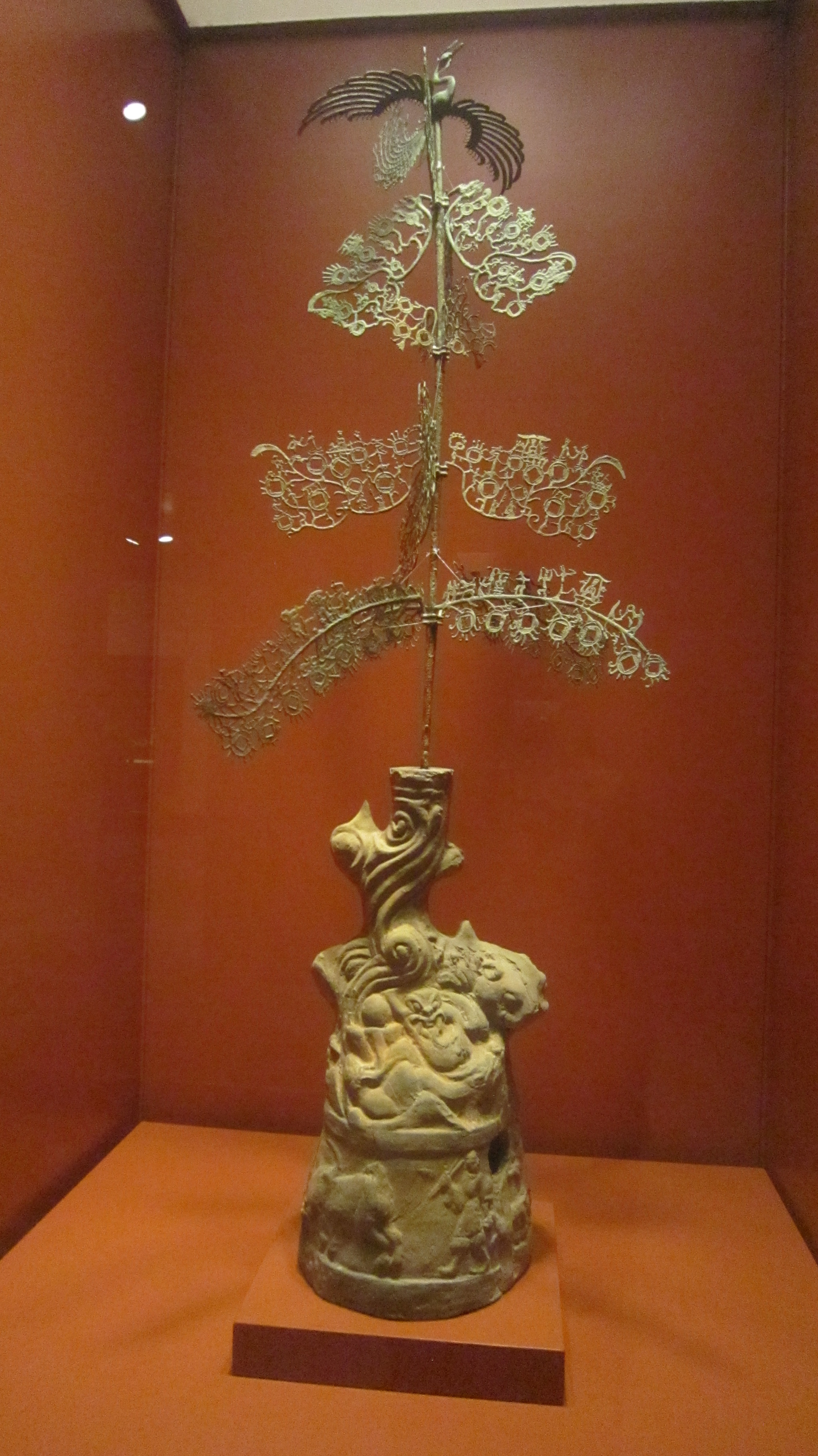
A Han dynasty money tree stored in the Hong Kong Heritage Museum

Chinese legend has it that the money tree (搖錢樹) is a type of holy tree that can bring money and fortune to the people, and that it is a symbol of affluence, nobility and auspiciousness. It can be traced back to primitive societies when the adoration of a holy tree was prevalent. Whilst Money trees may be derived from the Sun tree myth associated with paradise, the coins link paradise with a material bounty in this world. According to the existing historical narratives, the concept of the "money tree" is derived at the latest from the Han dynasty. Cast-bronze money trees are a conspicuous feature of Han tombs in Sichuan.

== Archaeology ==
Money trees have been excavated by archaeologists from Han tombs in western China in and near Sichuan Province, an indication that the adoration of the money tree was prevalent in the Han dynasty.

== Appearance ==
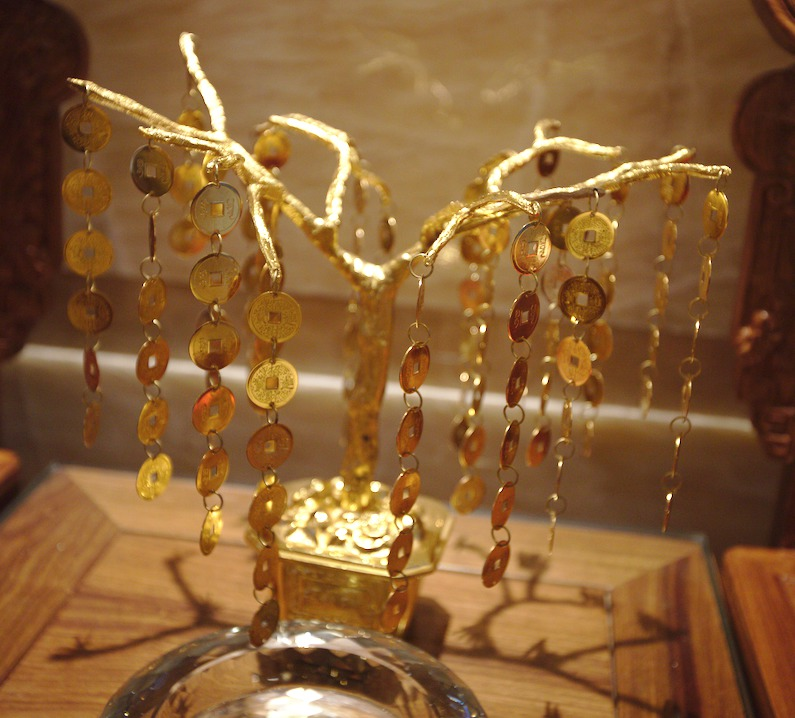
A modern 'money tree' observed in Yunnan, China, 1 December 2015

They are made from bronze and green-glazed earthenware. Money trees are decorated with scenes of paradise containing magical creatures and immortals including the sun bird, the moon toad, the deer who finds the main ingredient for the elixir of immortality, and the clever monkey who steals the elixir.

== Myths and folk tales ==
=== Folktales ===
One folk tale tells of a sculptor who placed fake money on a tree in order to trick villagers into cutting it down for him. But so many people believed the tree to be sacred that it became sacred and the sculptor is warned that if he cuts down or harms the tree he will be cursed. At the end of the story the sculptor is bribed not to harm the tree.

Also, touching the leaf will give one good fortune.

In modern use, "money tree" is used as a metaphor for something from which one is able to make great profit from, and can be translated into "cash cow" in English.

=== The underworld ===
It was thought that the coins emitted light, or that the coins guided the deceased, who would ride on a winged ram up the ceramic mountain to the bronze tree of paradise. These coins could also be plucked for needs on the journey from earth to the realm of immortals.

== Chinese New Year ==
The money tree regains popularity during the Chinese New Year. According to custom, money trees are made of a bushy pine or cypress branch nestled inside a porcelain pot filled with rice grains. Melon seeds and pine nuts are sprinkled over the top of the rice. Decorating the branches are gold and silver coin garlands made of paper. Symbols of long life (including paper cranes and deer) also embellish the tree, which is usually topped by the genie of wealth, Liu Hai, or the character for happiness.

In Malaysia, the Chinese put out money trees on the second day of the celebrations of the Chinese New Year.

== See also ==
- Bunga mas
- Pachira aquatica
