= Liu Haichan =

Taoist immortal

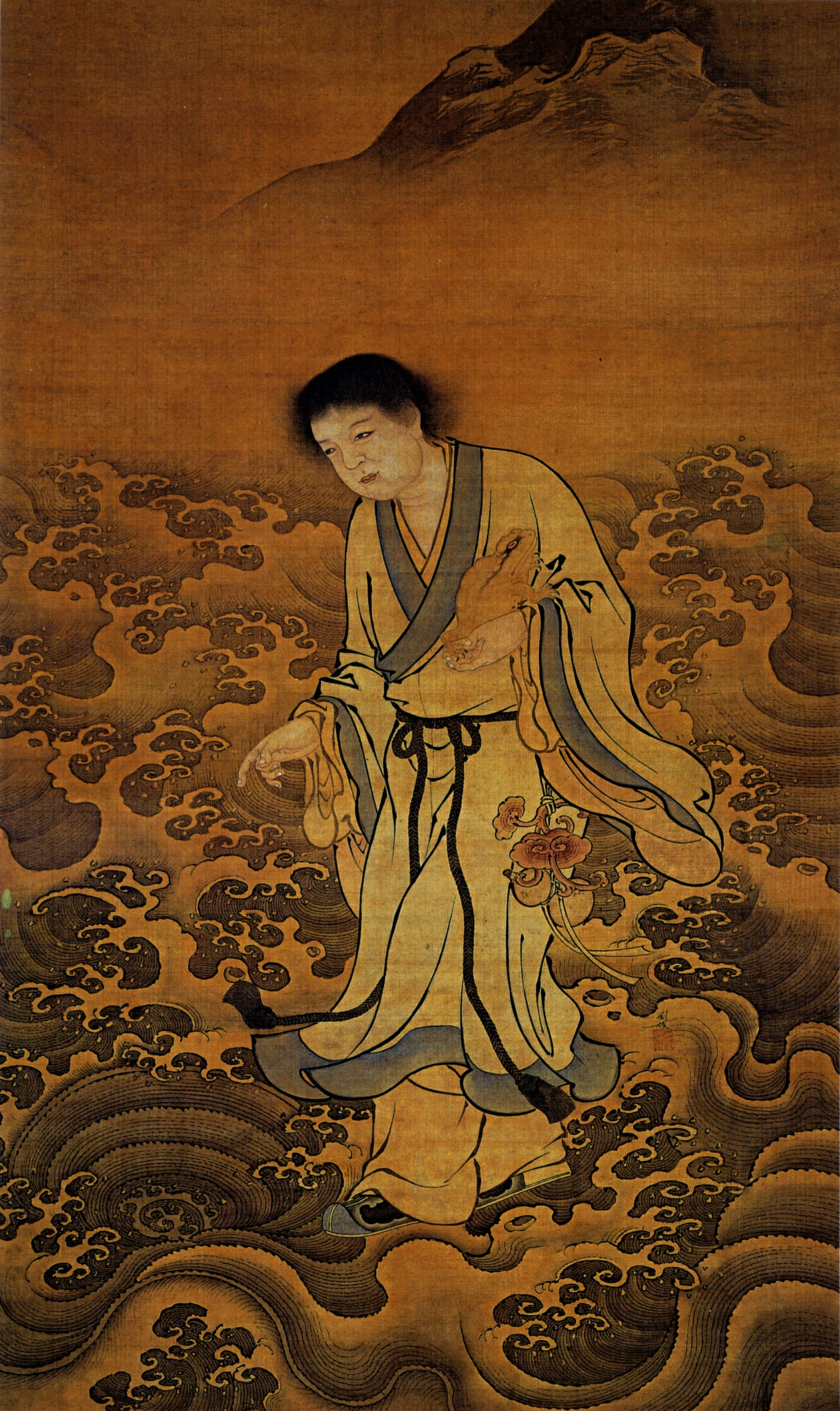
- Liu Haichan carrying a three-legged toad, (c. 15th century) painting by Li Jun

Chinese name
- Traditional Chinese: 劉海蟾
- Simplified Chinese: 刘海蟾
- Literal meaning: "Sea-Toad Liu"
Transcriptions
Standard Mandarin
- Hanyu Pinyin: Liú Hǎichán
- Wade–Giles: Liu^{2} Hai^{3}-ch'an^{2}
- IPA: [ljǒʊ xàɪ.ʈʂʰǎn]
Yue: Cantonese
- Jyutping: Lau^{4} Hoi^{2}sim^{4}
Southern Min
- Hokkien POJ: Lâu Háichiûⁿ
Middle Chinese
- Middle Chinese: Ljuw XojXtsyhem

Korean name
- Hangul: 류해섬
- Hanja: 劉海蟾
Transcriptions
- McCune–Reischauer: Ryu Haesŏm

Japanese name
- Kanji: 劉海蟾
- Hiragana: りゅう かいせん
Transcriptions
- Revised Hepburn: Ryū Kaisen

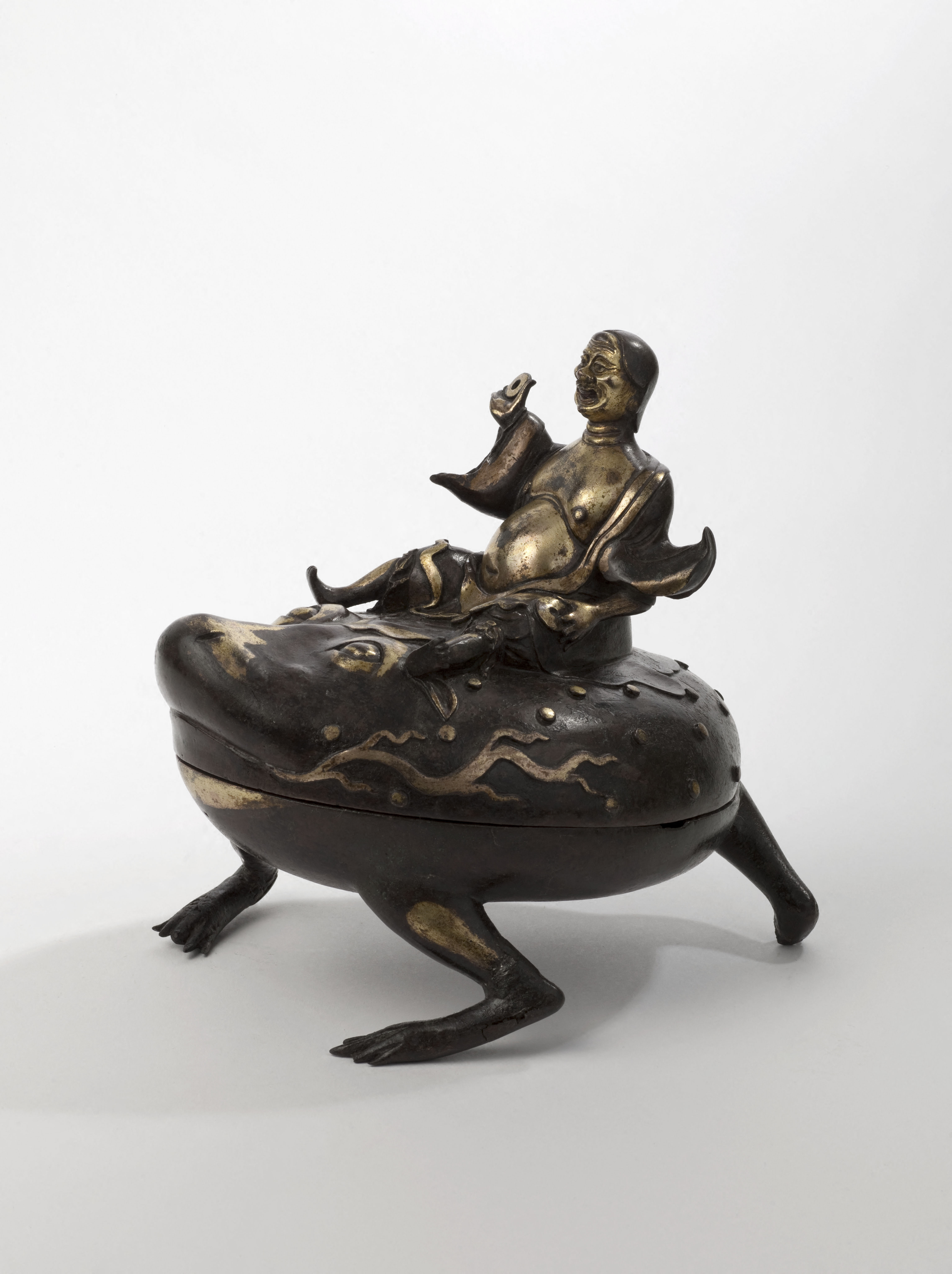
Bronze censer in a shape of three-legged toad carrying on its back Liu Haichan holding a coin. China, 17th-century. Musée Cernuschi

Liu Haichan (simplified Chinese: 刘海蟾; traditional Chinese: 劉海蟾; pinyin: Liú Hǎichán) was a (c. 10th century) Daoist xian ("transcendent; immortal") who was a patriarch of the Quanzhen School, and a master of neidan "internal alchemy" techniques. Liu Haichan is associated with other Daoist transcendents, especially Zhongli Quan and Lü Dongbin, two of the Eight Immortals. Traditional Chinese and Japanese art frequently represents Liu with a string of square-holed cash coins and a mythical three-legged chanchu (蟾蜍; "toad; toad in the Moon"). In the present day, it is called the Jin Chan (金蟾; 'Money Toad'), and Liu Haichan is considered an embodiment of Caishen, the God of Wealth.

== Names ==
Liu Haichan is known by many names. Liu (劉) is a common Chinese family name, notably for the Han dynasty imperial family. Haichan combines hǎi (海; "sea; ocean; huge group (of people/things)") and chán (蟾; "toad"), used in the compound chánchú (蟾蜍; 蟾諸 / 詹諸; "toad; fabled toad in the moon"). One source, the (early 17th century) Lidai Shenxian tongjian (歷代神仙通鑒; "Complete Historical Record of Immortals") takes Liuhai 劉海 as a Chinese compound surname, but that is otherwise unsupported. Liu's given name was Cao (操; "grasp; conduct"), which he later changed to Xuanying (玄英; "mysterious blossom"). Han Zhao Emperor Liu Cong (d. 318) had a son also named Liu Cao 劉操, who became Prince of Wei in 312. Liu Haichan's courtesy names were Zongcheng 宗成, Zhaoyuan 昭元, and Zhaoyuan 昭遠. Liu's Daoist philosophical name is Haichanzi (海蟾子; "Master Sea-Toad"). In later generations, he was simply called Liu Hai 劉海.

The immortal Liu Hai is usually depicted as a young man with bangs, and his eponym liúhǎi (劉海) means "bangs; fringe" in Modern Standard Chinese.

In Chinese biological classification, the name hǎi chánchú (海蟾蜍; 'sea toad') designates the toad species Bufo marinus (which is not native to China), while hǎi chányú (海蟾魚; 'sea toad fish') designates the genus Thalassophryne of the toadfish family Batrachoididae (Greek θαλασσα thalassa "sea" + φρυνε phryne "toad") - likewise not native to China. Certain species of subfamily Batrachoidinae of the Batrachoididae, on the other hand, are native to Southeast Asian waters and, with their toad-like appearance (featuring a bloated thorax narrowing abruptly to a slender tail) bear a distinct similarity to the traditional jīnchán: the thin tail of the toadfish, with its attendant tail fin resembles the curious third leg (with its attendant webbed foot) of the jīnchán .

The English common name sea toad, by contrast, is a catch-all for the deep-sea anglerfish family Chaunacidae.

In the Japanese language, Ryū Kaisen 劉海蟾 is also called Gama Sennin 蝦蟇仙人 "Toad Immortal" and his three-legged toad companion is identified as Seiajin 青蛙神 "Frog God". Chinese Qīngwā Shén 青蛙神 The Frog God is a short story by Pu Songling collected in the (1740) Strange Tales from a Chinese Studio

The sinologist Henri Doré says there is no agreement as to Liu Haichan's name, much less as to his acts and deeds.

== Legends ==
The hagiographic data on Liu Haichan are scant. His name is rarely mentioned, even in records about his putative beneficiary Zhang Boduan, except for one statement that Liu conveyed jīndān (金丹; "pill of immortality") formulas to Zhang during his visit to the region of Shu in 1069.

Liu Haichan is first recorded in several collections of biji "miscellaneous notes; notebooks" as a disciple of Chen Tuan (d. 989). Later hagiography is only found in compilations of the Quanzhen School, which claimed him as a patriarch.

The earliest biography of Liu Haichan is in the (1241) Jinlian zhengzong ji (金蓮正宗記; "Records of the Orthodox Sect of the Golden Lotus"), which inspired most later accounts of his life. It records that Liu was a native of the Yan Mountains, a major mountain range in northern Hebei province, near present-day Beijing. During the turbulent Five Dynasties period (907-957), Liu, who was an expert in Huang-Lao philosophy, passed the imperial examination with a jinshi degree. After briefly serving as a minister to Liu Shouguang, the self-declared emperor of the Yan state (911-914), Liu Haichan was appointed prime minister under Abaoji in 916, the founder of the foreign Liao dynasty or Khitan Empire (907-1125).

There is a famous story about how Liu Haichan was converted to Daoism. One day, at the height of his glory, Liu met a Daoist monk who called himself Zheng Yangzi (正陽子; "Master of Correct Yang")—but was actually the renowned Immortal Zhongli Quan. He asked Liu to get ten eggs and ten gold cash coins (with a hole in the middle), and then placed a coin under each, and piled them one on top of another. Liu yelled "How dangerous!" and the Daoist smilingly replied, "The position of a prime minister is much more dangerous!". Liu was suddenly awakened, resigned from his position, gave up his wealth, left home, and went wandering. He changed his name to Liu Xuanying and the Daoists called him Haichan "Sea Toad". Liu lived alone and practiced self-cultivation while travelling in Shaanxi between Mount Hua, a famous location for Daoist and Buddhist monks, and the Zhongnan Mountains, until he achieved Daoist xian-hood "immortality; transcendence".

As an immortal, Liu Haichan was especially revered in the 12th and 13th centuries. Quanzhen accounts said he was a friend of the Daoist adepts Chen Tuan (d. 989), Zhong Fang 種放 (955-1015), and Zhang Wumeng 張無夢 (fl. 985-1065). Liu was much less famous than his disciple Zhang Boduan 張伯端 (d. 1082), the author of the Wuzhen pian.

Liu Haichan's teachers were two of the Eight Immortals, Zhongli Quan (aka Zheng Yangzi above) and Lü Dongbin. These three were famous for roaming the world and persuading people to search for Daoist immortality. Their encounters were favorite topics not only of hagiographic works, but also of poems and plays. Although Zhongli and Lü have enjoyed a more durable popularity, Liu plays an eminent role in a number of stories. For example, the semi-vernacular Ningyang Dong zhenren yuxian ji (凝陽董真人遇仙記; "Records of the Perfected Person Dong Ningyang's Encounters with Immortals"), which tells the tale of a Jurchen soldier, Dong Shouzhi 董守志 (1160-1227), who repeatedly received visits and instructions from Liu, Lü, and Zhongli, and started a new Daoist school.

Scholars are uncertain about the dates of Liu Haichan's life, and have said he lived in the 10th century, Five Dynasties Period (907-960), floruit 1031,. and died before or circa 1050. Holmes Welch notes the chronological problem with Liu Haichan's hagiography. If he was a disciple of Lü Dongbin (fl. c. 800), a minister to Liu Shouguang in 911-913, and the teacher of Zhang Boduan in 1070, Liu Haichan "must have lived some 270 years, a ripe old age even among Taoists". Welch concludes that a disciple could adopt a Daoist master posthumously, either through books or visions.

== Writings ==
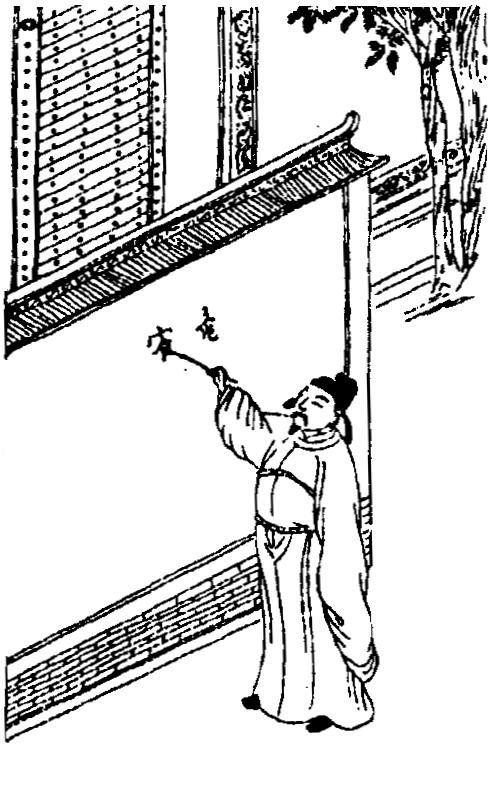
Liu Haichan writing calligraphy on a wall, (c. 1600) woodblock print

Although Liu Haichan's alchemical texts and poems seem to have been well-known, many became lost works, excepting some citations in the canonical Daozang and quotes in several Song and Yuan neidan works. Liu was also famous for his poetry and the calligraphic traces he left on temple walls—a way of creating new holy places that was also favored by Lü Dongbin.

The official bibliography sections of the (1060) New Book of Tang and the (1345) History of Song both ascribe the Huanjin pian (還金篇; "Chapters on Reverting Gold") to Liu Haichan, called Haichanzi Xuanying 海蟾子玄英, combining his Daoist names. Another text attributed to Liu is the Huangdi Yinfujing jijie (黃帝陰符經集解; "Collected Interpretations of the Yellow Emperor's Hidden Talisman Classic"), which is purportedly drawn from ten different sources, many of which are clearly late fabrications.

Liu's autobiographical Rudao ge (入道歌; "Song on Becoming a Taoist"), which is probably a Quanzhen apocryphon, is included in his standard biography found in the Jinlian zhengzong ji, and was carved on stone in several locations.

A short work entitled Zhizhen ge (至真歌; "Song of Ultimate Perfection") is ascribed to Liu in the (1796-1820) Daozang jiyao (道藏輯要; "Essentials of the Daoist Canon"). However, it identifies him as Haichan dijun 海蟾帝君, using the honorific title Dijun (帝君; "Sovereign Lord") that Song emperor Külüg Khan bestowed on him in 1310, suggesting that this edition, if not the composition itself, dates no earlier than the 14th century.

== Quanzhen lineages ==
According to traditional Daoist legend, the Quanzhen "Complete Perfection" School was founded by Wang Chongyang (1113-1170) after he received enlightenment from the teachings of the immortals Zhongli Quan, Lü Dongbin, and Liu Haichan in 1159. After Wang's death, these four and Donghua dijun (東華帝君; "Master of Eastern Florescence") were declared the Five Patriarchs of the Quanzhen School.

In the late 12th century, the Quanzhen School neidan "internal alchemy" tradition came to be divided into a Beizong (北宗; "Northern Lineage") and Nanzong (南宗; "Southern Lineage"), terms first used by Chan Buddhism. The date when the term Nanzong came into use is uncertain, and Boltz describes the lineage as ex post facto. The Northern Lineage emphasized monastic discipline, ascetic practices, and celibacy, along with some neidan practices. The primary concern of the Southern Lineage was neidan, and compared to the Nanzong, it was smaller, more loosely organized, and did not require members to become monks.

By the 13th century, the Five Patriarchs of the Southern Lineage were identified as Liu Haichan (fl. 1031), Zhang Boduan (d. c. 1082), Shi Tai 石泰 (d. 1158), Xue Zixian 薛紫賢 (d. 1191), and Chen Nan 陳楠 (d. 1213). Liu Haichan and his teachers Zhongli Quan and Lü Dongbin are revered by both the Quanzhen and Nanzong lineages. Liu's importance, however, appears to have waned already by the Yuan dynasty (1271-1368), and very few texts are attributed to him in later anthologies.

By the early 14th century, a number of Quanzhen works asserted that Liu had conveyed the teachings of the venerable Zhongli Quan to Wang Chongyang in the north and to Zhang Boduan in the south, a claim that was no doubt extremely useful to Quanzhen textual codifiers who sought to find a common origin for their Northern and Southern Lineages.

== Symbolism ==
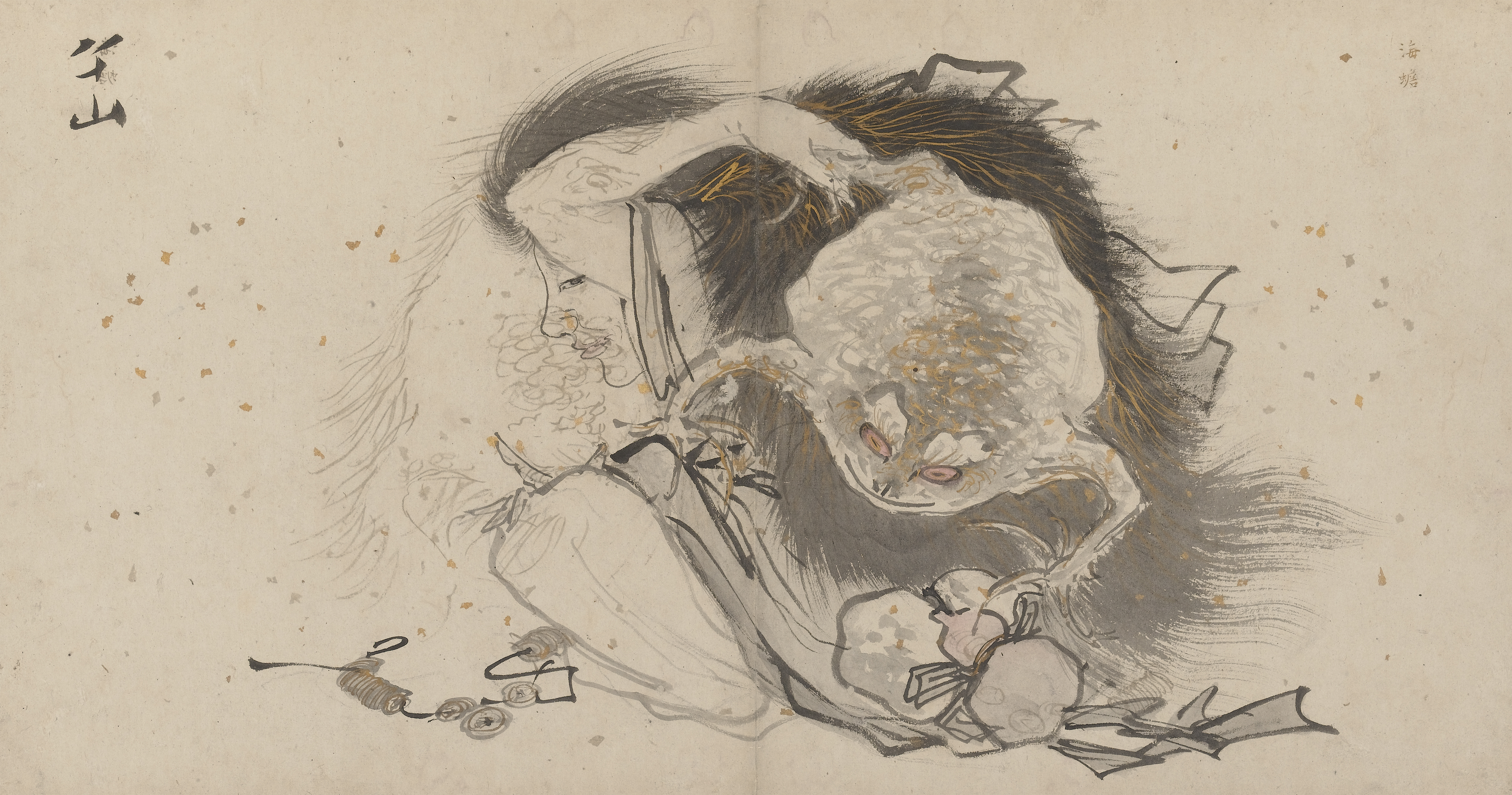
Liu Haichan with his Money Toad and string of cash, (early 16th century) painting by Zhang Lu

In Chinese mythology and yin yang theory, the three-legged toad is a Moon symbol and the three-legged crow is a Sun symbol (compare the yu; "a three-legged tortoise that causes malaria"). According to an ancient tradition, the tripedal toad is the transformed Chang'e lunar deity who stole the elixir of life from her husband Houyi the archer, and fled to the Moon where she was turned into a toad.

Ge Hong's (c. 320 CE) Baopuzi lists 10,000-year old chanchu toad as a magical rouzhi ("meat/flesh excrescence") that provides the invulnerability and longevity associated with Daoist xian. (Zhi 芝 usually means "mushroom; fungus", especially the lingzhi mushroom, but Daoists also uses it to mean "excrescence; numinous substance".)

The ten-thousand-year-old hoptoad is said to have horns on its head, while under its chin there is a double-tiered figure 8 written in red. It must be captured at noon on the fifth day of the fifth moon and dried in the shade for a hundred days. A line drawn on the ground with its left root will become a running stream. When its left foreleg is carried on the person, it will ward off all types of weapons. If an enemy shoots at you, the bow and arrow will both turn against the archer. The thousand-year-old bat is as white as snow. When perching, it hangs head down because its brain is heavy. If both of these creatures are obtained, dried in the shade, powdered, and taken, a body can live for forty thousand years.

Another Chinese folklore tradition is that during the night, Liu Hai's three-legged toad produces a pearl that, when eaten, can change a person into a xian immortal or can restore a corpse to life.

Traditional Chinese medicine uses chánsū (蟾酥; "dried venom of toads; toad-cake; bufotoxin") as an anesthetic and heart tonic. Since ingesting bufotoxin can produce hallucinogenic effects, there is a psychoactive toad hypothesis to explain the relationship between Liu Haichan and his toad. Joseph Needham and Lu Gwei-djen say the three-legged toad and drug-pounding Moon rabbit both symbolize the Moon and therefore of the Yin force, which was vital for making waidan alchemical elixirs. Some ancient Daoists valued toad flesh "as an aid to prolongevity and immortality", and which could cause a person to escape invisibly from captivity.

The original identity of the Daoist master Liu Haichan as a teacher of esoteric neidan techniques greatly differs from his contemporary persona as a god of wealth and business success. reproduces a Dragon Boat Festival talisman of Liu Hai and his toad that was believed to provide a family good luck and protection.

Liu Haichan is traditionally represented as a child with a string or sash of coins and a three-legged toad (symbols of good fortune), two attributes "probably borrowed" from the immortals Lan Caihe and Helan Qizhen 賀蘭棲真, both of whom were irregulars in the Eight Immortals. First, Lan Caihe was known for dragging a string of coins casually on the ground when begging in streets, symbolically showing an utter contempt for money. Once the string of coins changed hands, it created a new iconography for Liu's enlightenment by Zhongli Quan stacking up eggs and coins to represent the precariousness of human existence. Second, the Northern Song dynasty Daoist master Helan Qizhen 賀蘭棲真 (d. 1010) supposedly achieved immortality by devouring a three-legged golden toad. The Yuan dynasty author Luo Tianxiang 駱天驤 wrote, "In White Deer Abbey on Mount Li, there is a Toad Well, in which there was a three-legged toad of golden color. 'This is a meat fungus,' [i.e., rouzhi 肉芝 above] exclaimed Master He-lan when he saw it. He cooked and ate it, whereupon he flew up to the sky in broad daylight." Anning Jing suggests this story about Helan Qizhen eating a toad might have been a literal interpretation of a Daoist neidan in which "golden toad" represents the zhēnjīng (真精; "true essence"); which is mentioned in a poem by the Southern Song scholar-official Li Shih 李石 (1108-1181): "I have heard that the delicacy of old toad is a drug / That can turn even grass into golden bud; / But would it be better to close [my] mouth and nourish internally / To replace your [toad's] ugly substance and nurture [my internal] bud. / Riding you, I shall fly to the palace in the moon / And descend to see the mulberry sea that reaches the clouds beyond the sky."

There are two versions of the Chinese folktale called Liúhǎi xì [jīn]chán 劉海戲[金]蟾 "Liu Hai plays with the [golden] toad"

[Liu Hai] employed [his toad] as a charger to carry him instantaneously from place to place. The creature was not entirely reconciled to this mode of life, and occasionally escaped by diving down the nearest well. Its passion for the gleam of gold, however, invariably led to its recapture, when its master dangled a string of cash before its eyes. He is popularly represented with one foot on the toad's head, holding in his hand a ribbon, or fillet, on which are strung five golden coins. The design is known as "Liu Hai sporting with the toad" (劉海戲蟾), and is regarded as highly auspicious and conducive to good fortune. Another version of the story, inconsistent with the last or the Moon theory, is that the reptile lived in a deep pool and exuded a vapour poisonous to the neighborhood, and that it was thus hooked and destroyed by Liu Hai, exemplifying the fatal attraction of money to lure men to their ruin.

Liu sometimes figures as a door god at Chinese temples, in partnership with the Tianguan Dadi.

Lastly, Liu Hai is the Chinese patron saint of needle makers.

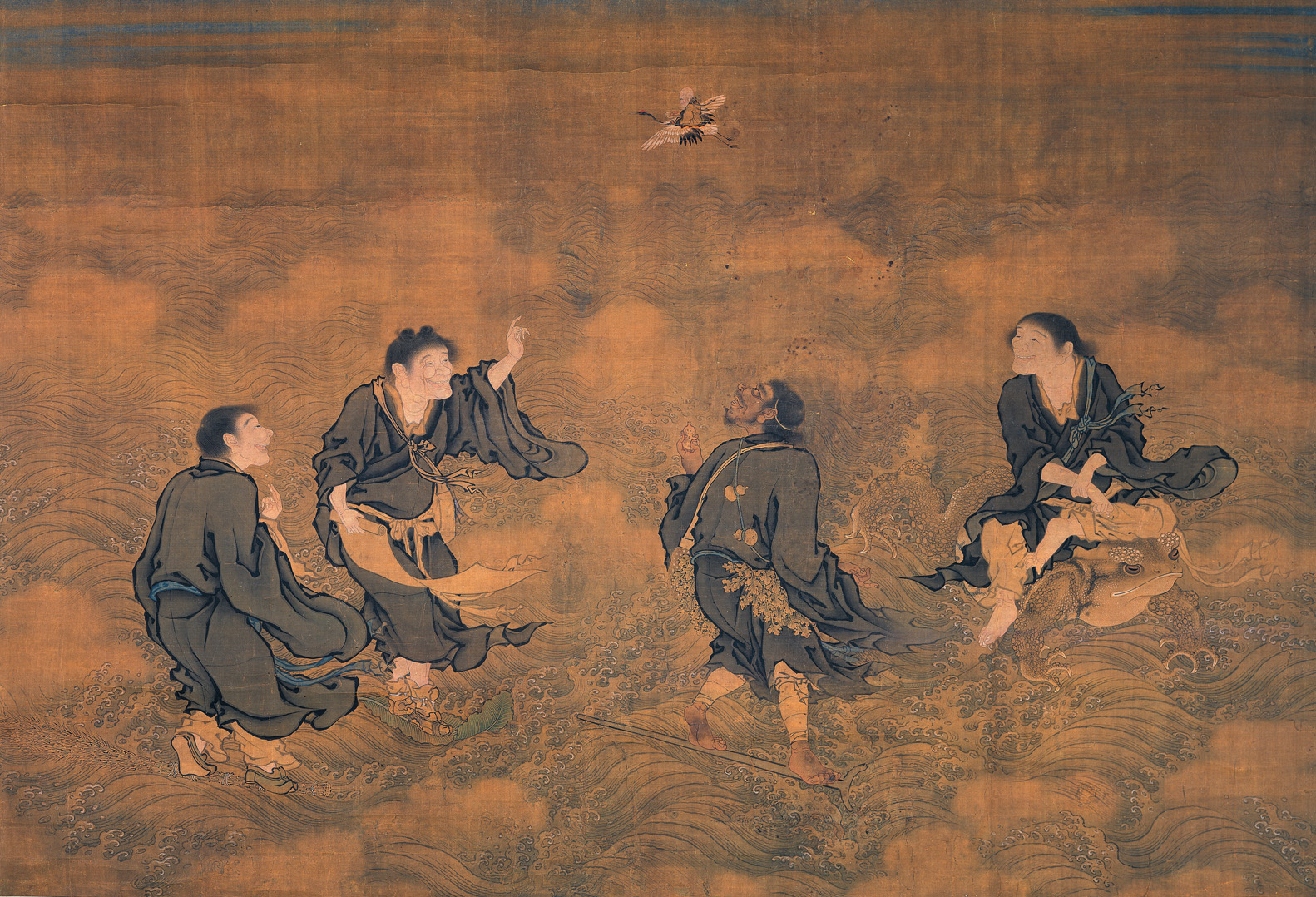
Four Transcendents waving to the Longevity God, (left to right) Shide, Hanshan, Iron-Crutch Li, and Liu Haichan on a toad, (c. 15th century) scroll by Shang Xi, National Palace Museum

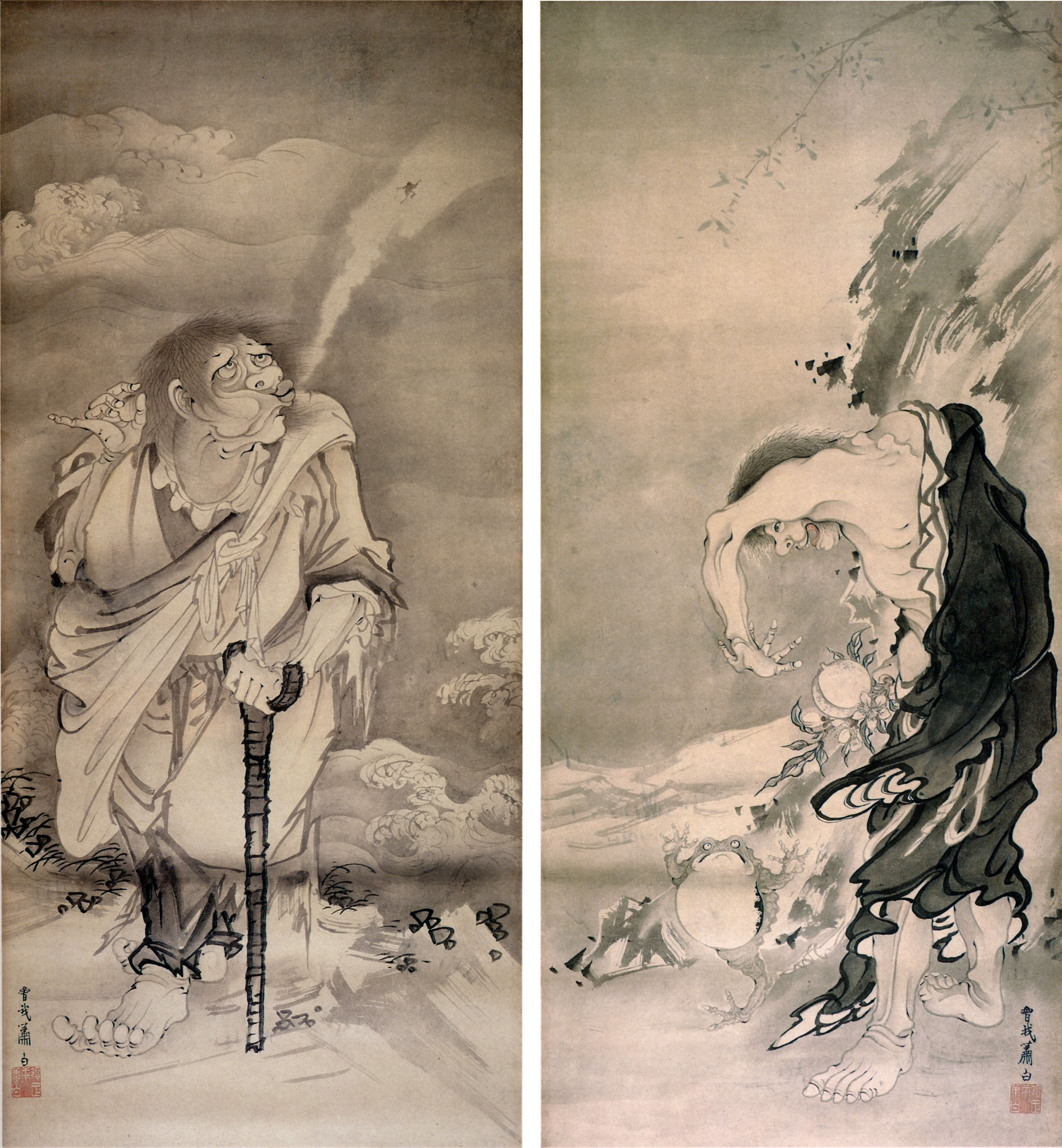
Soga Shōhaku (c. 1770) ink wash painting of Iron-Crutch Li and Liu Haichan (right)

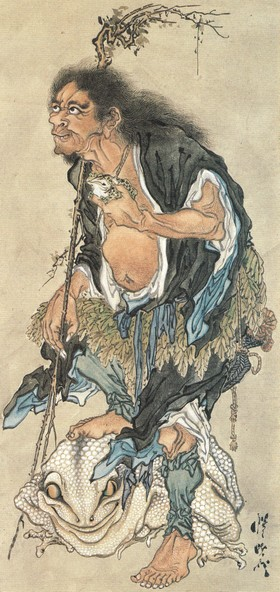
Liu Haichan with small and large toads, (c. 1876) painting by Kawanabe Kyōsai

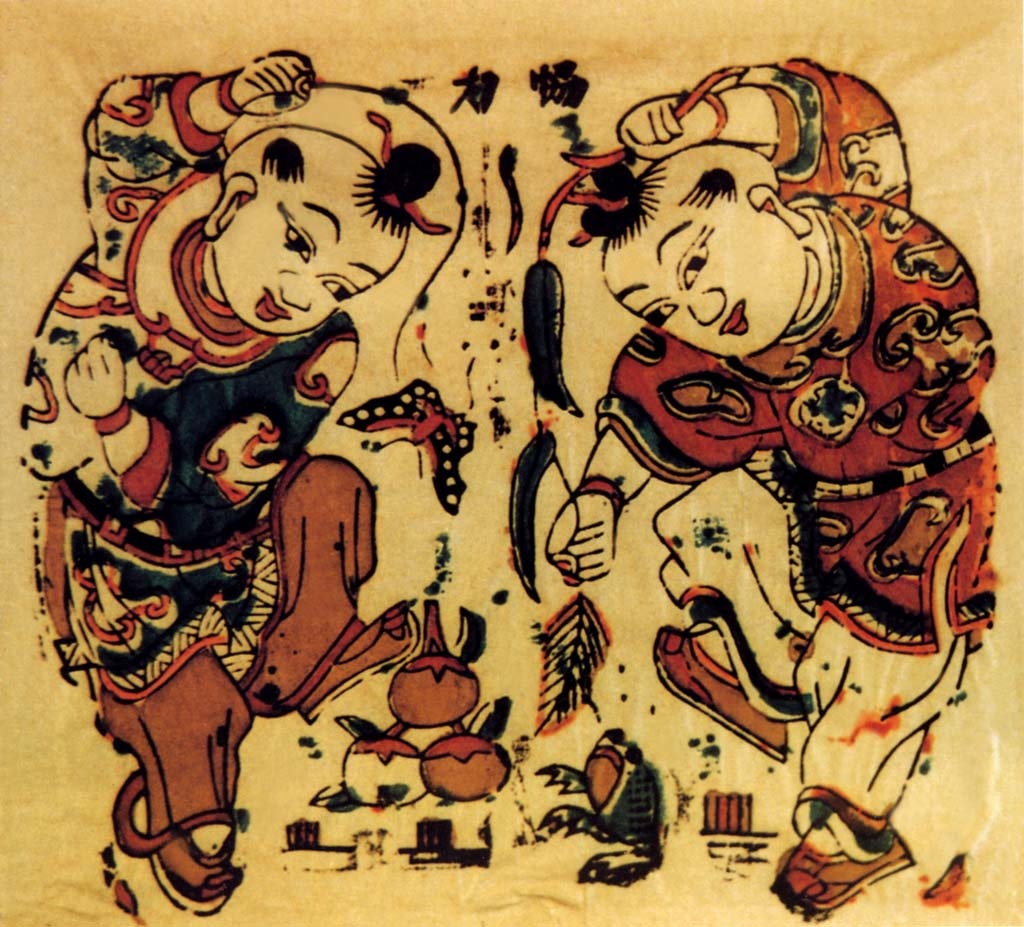
Woodblock print showing Liu Haichan (right) playing with a wealth-giving toad

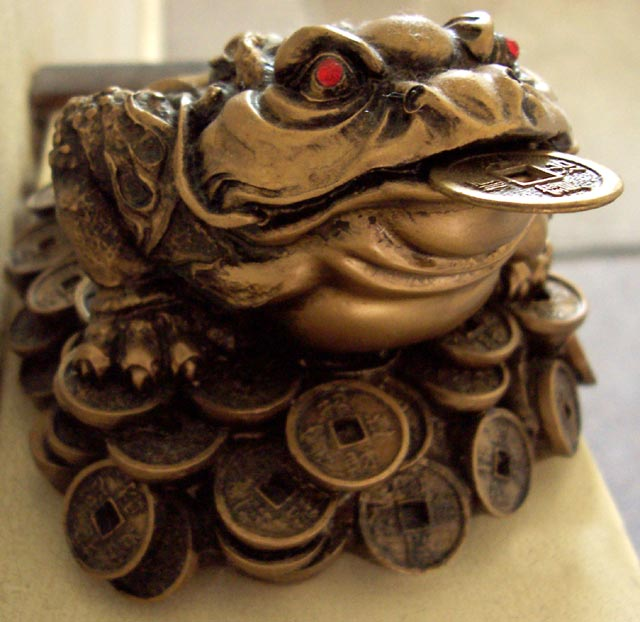
A money-frog resin sculpture

== See also ==
- Money tree (myth)
