= Jin Chan =

Feng shui charm for prosperity

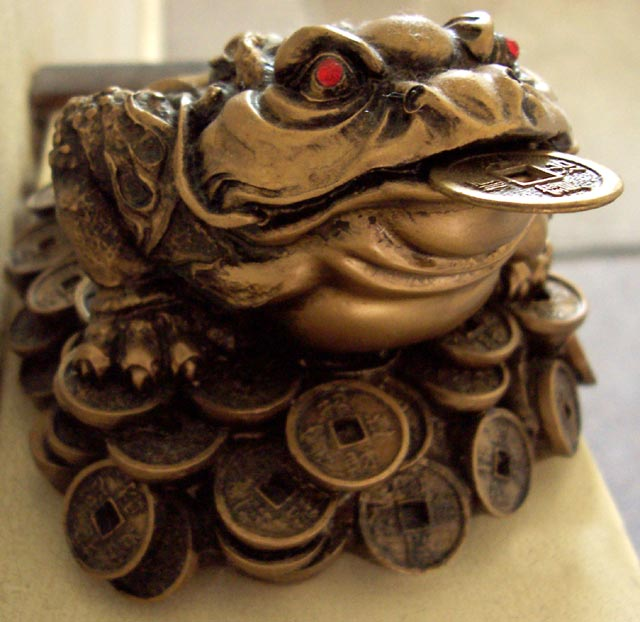
A three-legged money toad

The Jin Chan (Chinese: 金蟾; pinyin: jīn chán; lit. 'Golden Toad'), also called Chan Chuy (Chinese: 蟾蜍; pinyin: chánchú; lit. 'Toad') or "Zhaocai Chan Chu" (Chinese: 招财蟾蜍; pinyin: zhāocái chánchú; lit. 'wealth-beckoning toad'), is most commonly translated as "Money Toad" or "Money Frog". It represents a popular feng shui charm for prosperity.

This mythical creature is said to appear during the full moon, near houses or businesses that will soon receive good news (most of the time, the nature of this good news is understood to be wealth-related).

The Jin Chan is usually depicted as a bullfrog with red eyes, flared nostrils and only one hind leg (for a total of three legs), sitting on a pile of traditional Chinese cash, with a coin in its mouth. On its back, it often displays seven diamond spots. According to feng shui beliefs, Jin Chan helps attract and protect wealth, and guards against bad luck. Because it symbolizes the flow of money, feng shui lore insists that a Jin Chan statue should not be positioned facing the main door ("outward"). It also "should never be kept in the bathroom, bedroom, dining room or kitchen".

The Jin Chan is a legendary animal of the Han people. The money toad is associated with the Daoist monk, Liu Haichan, as the xianren's animal companion.

== See also ==
- Cash coins in feng shui
- Lucky Frog, sculpture inspired by this tradition
- Maneki Neko
- Nang Kwak
