= Lucky Frog =

Sculpture in Madrid, Spain

Coordinates: 40°25′29″N 3°41′28″W

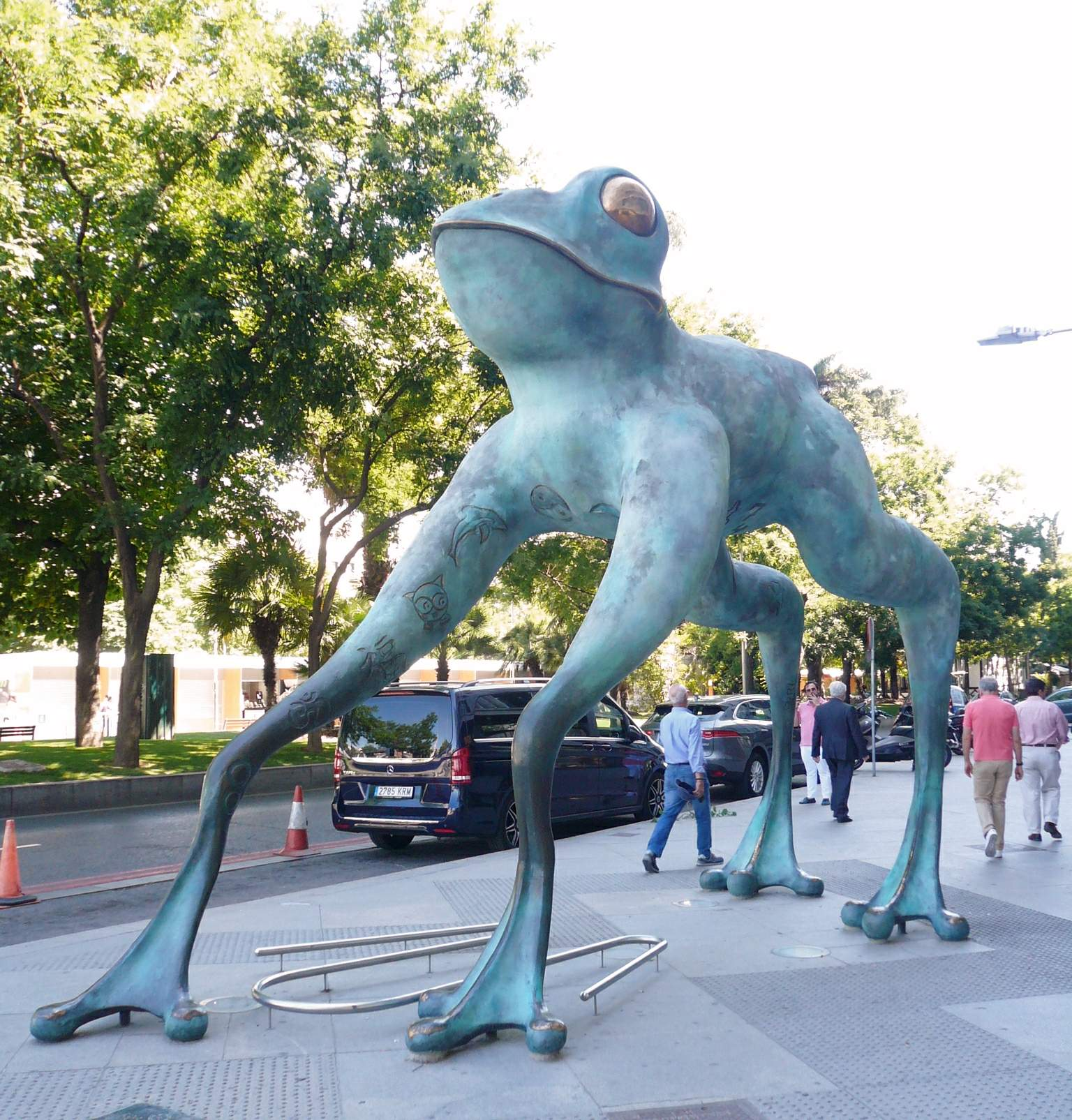

Lucky Frog (Spanish: Rana de la fortuna) is a bronze sculpture of a frog by the Spanish artist dEmo, installed in Madrid, Spain, in 2014, outside the Casino Gran Madrid on the Paseo de Recoletos. The sculpture is 5 metres (16 ft) tall and weighs 2,000 kilograms (4,400 lb).

The work was commissioned for the opening of the casino, and was a gesture of thanks to the city for restoring legal gambling after 90 years. It was unveiled on 3 April 2014 by journalist Carme Chaparro and actor Paco León.

Its underbelly is engraved with symbols of good luck from world cultures. The 34 symbols include several numbers as well as pictures including a scarab artifact, a four-leaf clover, the peace sign and various currency symbols and religious signs. The patina, the protective coating on the metal, was applied by specialist Juan Manuel González. Its turquoise green is also considered lucky.

The sculpture is located near to Fernando Botero's Woman with Mirror, another bronze sculpture gifted to the city, and faces the Monument to Columbus.

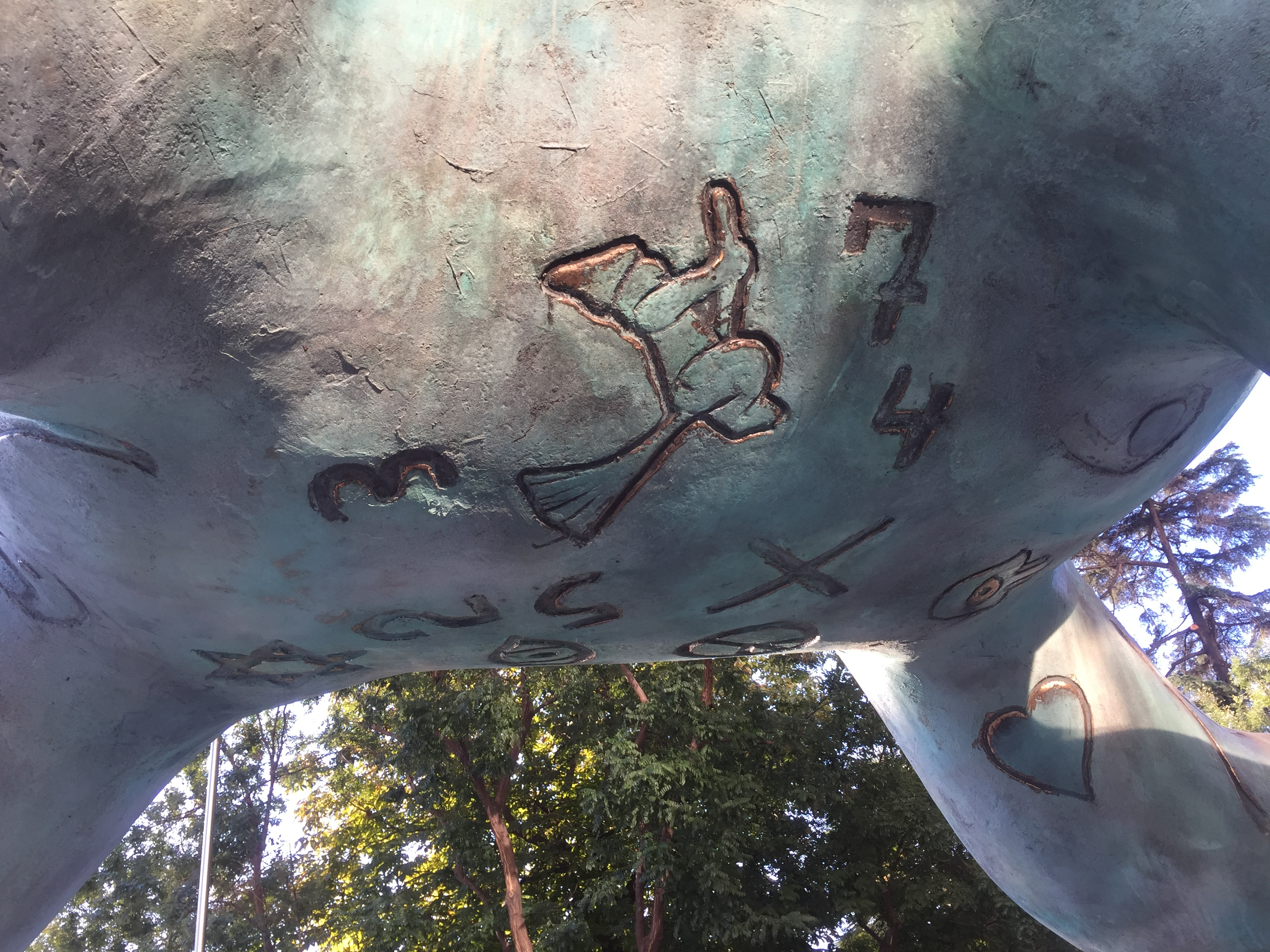
Detail of the underbelly, featuring signs of good fortune from world cultures

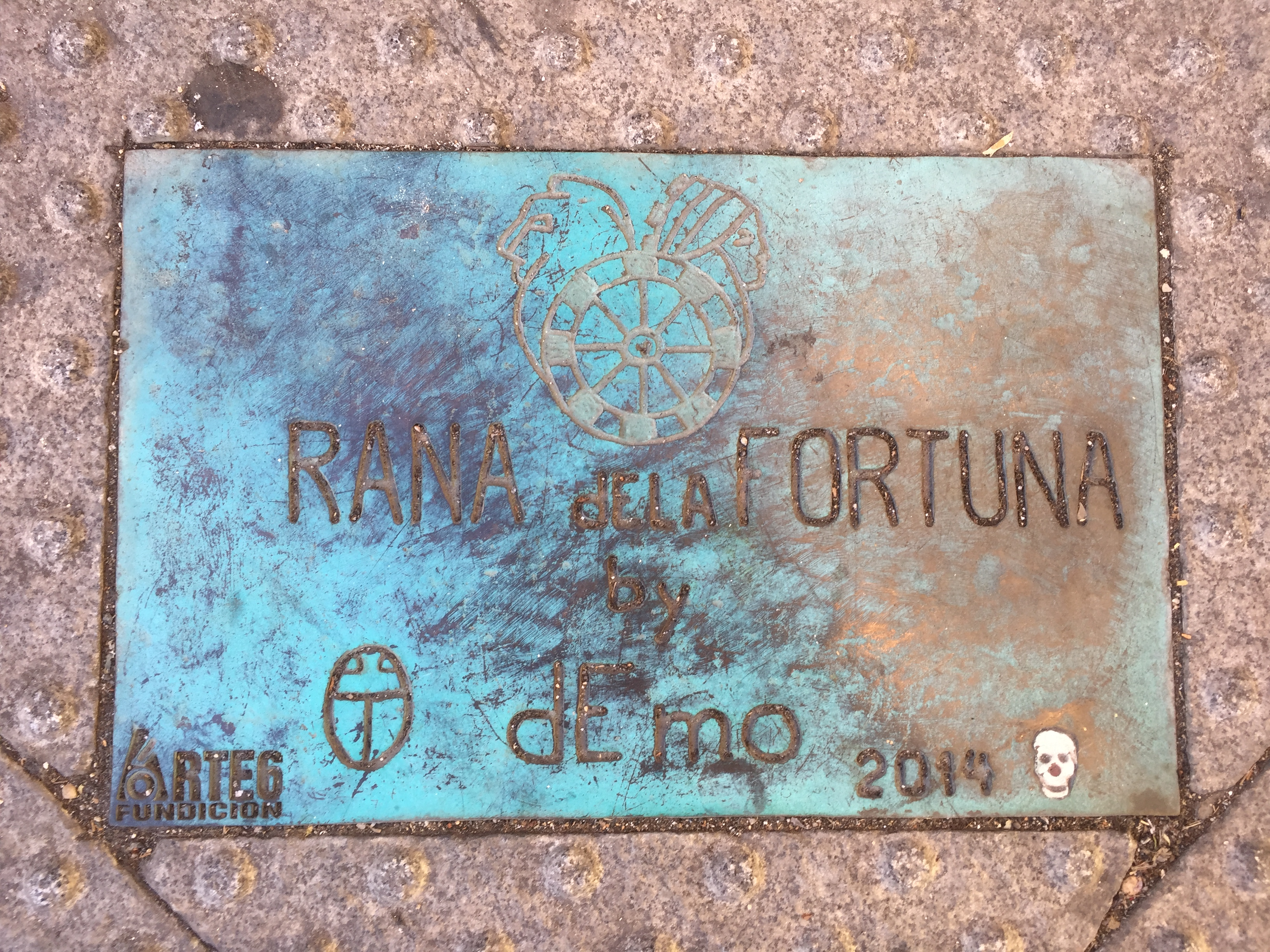
Plaque
