= List of Jackie Chan Adventures episodes =

Jackie Chan Adventures is an animated television series chronicling the adventures of a fictionalized version of action film star Jackie Chan, voiced by James Sie. This series ran on Kids' WB from September 9, 2000, to July 8, 2005, for a total of 95 episodes, and had 5 seasons. During its run, it was also shown on Cartoon Network, and afterwards its reruns landed on Toon Disney's Jetix block. An Arabic translation has been airing on MBC 3 since early 2005. The series spawned multiple comic books, novels, and magazines, along with two video games and a toy line. The series ended on July 8, 2005, just five episodes away from its 100th.

== Series overview ==
Season	Episodes	Originally released	
Season	Episodes	First released	Last released
1	13	September 9, 2000	March 17, 2001
2	39	September 8, 2001	September 7, 2002
3	17	September 14, 2002	May 3, 2003
4	13	September 13, 2003	February 14, 2004
5	13	September 11, 2004	July 8, 2005

== Episodes ==
=== Season 1 (2000–01) ===
No. overall	No. in season	Title	Directed by	Written by	Original release date
1	1	"The Dark Hand"	Bryan Andrews	John Rogers	September 9, 2000
Jackie Chan, an archaeologist and martial arts expert, is recruited by his close friend Captain Augustus Black, head of the secretive association, Section 13, to investigate the criminal organization known as the Dark Hand, whom he had encountered after recovering a shield from abroad. With help from his Uncle and his niece Jade, who recently arrived from Hong Kong, he soon discovers the Dark Hand's leader Valmont is seeking a set of twelve magical talismans, based on the animals of the Chinese zodiac, the first being in the shield – the Rooster Talisman. However, the Chans are unaware that Valmont seeks them for his client Shendu, a demonic dragon sorcerer seeking to escape his magical imprisonment, who supplies his organization with shadow ninjas called the Shadowkhan.
2	2	"The Power Within"	Vincenzo Tripetti	David Slack	September 16, 2000
Shortly after recovering the Rooster Talisman, Jade accidentally swallows it when enjoying a meal with her family. When the Dark Hand attempt to recover it, Jade quickly discovers what happened when she learns that the talisman grants its user to lift and levitate objects, including themselves. However, Jackie realizes she is in danger when the Dark Hand are intent on recovering the talisman, even if it means operating on her.
3	3	"The Mask of El Toro Fuerte"	Andy Thom	Duane Capizzi	September 22, 2000
Jackie and Jade head to Mexico to find the Ox Talisman, which grants its user superhuman strength. They soon find attached to a luchador mask used by the undefeated Mexican wrestler El Toro Fuerte. After the Dark Hand's enforcers steals the mask from him and captures Jackie, El Toro becomes ashamed of the fact the talisman was the reason behind his winning streak in wrestling, especially when his most loyal fan Paco feels betrayed at discovering his idol's power was fake. When Jade convinces him to rely on his own strength, El Toro works with her to rescue Jackie and recover the talisman, in order to restore his dignity and stop the Dark Hand.
4	4	"Enter the Viper"	Andy Thom	Kevin Campbell	September 23, 2000
Infamous female thief Viper mistakenly gets her hands on the Snake Talisman, and discovers it allows its user to turn invisible. Jackie and Jade, who sought to recover the talisman, finds themselves in a race to stop her using it to steal previous jewels around New York City. As Jackie must elude the police, who mistake him for the Viper, he also finds himself having to convince Viper she is in mortal danger when the Dark Hand close in on her.
5	5	"Shell Game"	Andy Thom	Duane Capizzi	October 14, 2000
Both Jade and the Dark Hand discover that a giant tortoise in the city's aquarium happens to have the Rabbit Talisman, which confers the power of superhuman speed to its user. When the tortoise is stolen by the Dark Hand's enforcer, Jade is shocked to learn it is to be sold to a cruel millionaire that seeks to eat it, upon the talisman being removed from its shell. Jackie finds that he must not only recover the talisman from the Dark Hand, but also help Jade rescue the tortoise from its captors.
6	6	"Project A, for Astral"	Bryan Andrews	David Slack	October 28, 2000
After Jackie recovers the Sheep Talisman, which allows its user to astrally project their spirit, Jade decides to use it for fun. However, while absent from her body, the Dark Hand manage to steal the talisman unobserved, and provide its power to Shendu. When he realizes from Valmont's men what Jade has done, Shendu swiftly projects his spirit into her body in hopes of recovering the other talismans held in Section 13. After Jade warns her uncle in his dreams, Jackie is forced to stop Shendu in his tracks long enough so that Uncle can exorcise his spirit from Jade's body.
7	7	"Bullies"	Rick Del Carmen	Tom Pugsley & Greg Klein	November 11, 2000
Angered by Shendu's control over his organization, Valmont goes behind his back when his men return with the Dragon Talisman they had acquired. Discovering it can allow its user to project dragon fire, Valmont leads the Dark Hand on a crime spree, putting Captain Black in hospital when Section 13 attempt to stop him. Enraged, Jackie vows revenge on Valmont, much to Jade's concern after she is being taught about discipline when she is given detention for beating up a bully. As Valmont prepares to hit Fort Knox and steal its gold reserves, Jackie finds himself forced to calm down in order to defeat him, especially when Uncle and Jade come to his aid.
8	8	"Tough Break"	Gloria Jenkins	David Slack	November 18, 2000
Jackie manages to escape with the Rat Talisman, which grants the power to bring inanimate objects to life, after retrieving it from an auction. Upon his return, he swiftly breaks his leg on an action figure toy that Jade had purchased. When she accidentally puts the talisman into the toy's battery compartment, Jackie is forced to recover it despite his current condition, especially when the Dark Hand enforcers close in on the action figure.
9	9	"The Rock"	Bryan Andrews	Alexx Van Dyne	December 2, 2000
When Jackie manages to recover the Horse Talisman, which has the power to heal its user of any affliction and injuries they receive, Valmont lures him into a trap at Mount Rushmore. Injected with a poison from Shendu that turns its victims slowly into stone, Jackie is told that he will only receive the antidote if he delivers all the talismans being stored in Section 13. Although he refuses, Jade decides to save her uncle's life despite the trouble it will cause, forcing Jackie to stop her even if it means he will be petrified completely.
10	10	"The Jade Monkey"	Rick Del Carmen	David Slack	December 9, 2000
Jackie and Jade face off against the Dark Hand's enforcers as they seek to claim the Monkey Talisman, which allows its user to shapeshift themselves or another into any animal or creature. When an accident separates her from Jackie, Jade accidentally shapeshifts into a monkey while trying to keep back the Dark Hand. When Jackie discovers what has happened, he is forced to track down a real non-transformed monkey that had stolen the talisman, before the Dark Hand enforcers find it.
11	11	"The Dog and Piggy Show"	Andy Thom	Duane Capizzi	February 10, 2001
After Jackie manages to get his hands on the Dog Talisman, which grants its user the power of immortality, Valmont berates his top enforcer Tohru for failing too often against him. In order to recover the Pig Talisman, which grants its user heat vision power, Valmont recruits martial arts expert Hak Foo to lead his enforcers into beating Jackie, Uncle and Jade, as they head to Bavaria to recover the talisman.
12	12	"The Tiger and the Pussycat"	Bryan Andrews	David Slack	March 10, 2001
Jackie and Jade defeat Tohru to claim the Tiger Talisman, unaware it has the power to split a user's yin and yang sides into separate entities. When Jackie is accidentally affected by the talisman, after it is split in half, his yang counterpart is manipulated by Valmont into recovering the talismans from Section 13. When Jade and Uncle discover this, they swiftly work to stop this with Jackie's yin counterpart, only for Tohru to get hold of the talismans. Despite Jackie's yin and yang selves eventually working together to stop Valmont, they are soon unable to prevent him using the talismans on Shendu and releasing him from his imprisonment, restoring the demonic dragon to his true form.
13	13	"Day of the Dragon"	Jane Wu Soriano	Alexx Van Dyne	March 17, 2001
Shendu, now restored into his true form – a 30-foot humanoid, demonic dragon – swiftly returns to his palace near Hong Kong, in order to begin his conquest of the world. Aided by Tohru, who decides to revoke his criminal past, Jackie, Uncle and Jade head after Shendu, with help from Captain Black after he realizes Jackie's claims on magic were true. They soon learn that the only way to defeat Shendu is to remove the talismans that restored the demonic dragon to life, before he can summon forth a host of dragons upon humanity.

=== Season 2 (2001–02) ===
No. overall	No. in season	Title	Directed by	Written by	Original release date
14	1	"Through the Rabbit Hole"	Michael Chang	David Slack	September 8, 2001
Jade attempts to take the rabbit talisman to school without Jackie's knowledge but accidentally causes the talisman to be hit by an experimental chronoton beam in Section 13's lab while hiding from Jackie. When Jade tries to use the rabbit talisman to avoid being late for school, she is transported back in time. Valmont sends the Dark Hand's enforcers through the portal Jade created to find her and the talisman, and Jackie is forced to chase after them, especially when his past self is placed in mortal danger.: Note: This is one of three episodes whose plot was written after the first season's conclusion and released during season two, despite being set during the first season's over-arching story. The events are set after the episode "Shell Game".
15	2	"The Warrior Incarnate"	Phil Weinstein	Dean Stefan	September 15, 2001
Jade accidentally breaks an ancient terracotta statue of Lo Pei, the warrior who defeated Shendu and imprisoned him in a statue before scattering the talismans containing his powers around the world. After using the horse talisman to repair the damage, Jade decides to reanimate the statue with the rat talisman so Lo Pei can share the locations of the remaining talismans. However, Jade and Jackie find themselves trying to convince Lo Pei that they are not enemies, especially when the Dark Hand attempt to trick him into handing over the talismans to them.: Note: This is one of three episodes whose plot was written after the first season's conclusion and released during season two, despite being set during the first season's over-arching story. The events are set after the episode "The Rock".
16	3	"Snake Hunt"	Rick Del Carmen	David Slack	September 30, 2001
Jackie and Jade set out to find the snake talisman, which they have learned is hidden in the temple of Culebra Gigante in South America. However, they soon find themselves crossing paths with an egotistical archaeologist who stars in his own TV show, Wesley Rank. Rank tries to find the talisman himself to prove his archaeological superiority, but the arrival of the Dark Hand complicates the search. Jackie soon has his hands full attempting to retrieve the talisman while dealing with the Dark Hand, Rank, and the guardian of the talisman.: Note: This is one of three episodes whose plot was written after the first season's conclusion and released during season two, despite being set during the first season's over-arching story. The events are set before the episode "Enter The Viper".
17	4	"Mother of All Battles"	Andy Thom	Dean Stefan	September 24, 2001
Now working as Uncle's assistant, Tohru is shocked when his mother makes a surprise visit to see him. In private, Tohru confides in Jade how he feels ashamed that he has never proven himself worthy to earn his mother's love, despite never being honest about the fact he worked for criminals. However, when another crime gang convince him to steal a priceless artifact, which Jackie is tasked with guarding, Tohru decides to double-cross them, but soon faces problems when they seek revenge.
18	5	"The Stronger Evil"	Frank Squillace	David Slack	September 29, 2001
Eager to rebuild his organization after Section 13 shut down his headquarters in the wake of Shendu's defeat, Valmont decides to initiate a crime spree with the talismans the Dark Hand recovered. As Jackie, Jade, Uncle and Captain Black work to stop them, unbeknown to them all, Shendu returns to the world as a spirit, in order to begin a new plan to conquer the world – this time with his demonic brethren. After a freak accident causes him to possess Valmont instead of Jackie, he swiftly makes the most of the situation in order to steal a book from Uncle's library, while leaving Jackie and Black to be confronted by the Shadowkhan.
19	6	"The J-Team"	Alan Caldwell	David Slack	October 6, 2001
After failing to convince his superiors about the existence of magic, Captain Black instructs Jackie to pursue after the Dark Hand, recover the talismans, and discover what Shendu is planning. Uncle soon discovers Shendu stole a book detailing a collection of magical artifacts being held in Tibet. To help Jackie on his mission, Jade forms a team consisting of their allies, including El Toro, Viper and Paco, who swiftly manage to outdo the Dark Hand and recover the talismans. However, Uncle soon realizes Shendu is seeking to release his demonic brethren through a magical artifact used to imprison them behind demonic portals. While the talismans are sent back to Section 13, Jackie and Jade find they must begin a new quest to thwart Shendu's latest plan for world conquest.
20	7	"Jade Times Jade"	Christopher Berkeley	Eddie Guzelian	October 13, 2001
Shendu forces the Dark Hand to travel to Japan, after learning that the demon portal for Po Kong, who holds dominion over mountains, resides somewhere along a major river. Jackie soon finds himself following after them, unaware that Jade intends to accompany him after Tohru is made Uncle's apprentice in chi magic. However, to do so, she uses a duplication spell that she makes a mistake with, causing her to continue to duplicate. However, she soon makes amends by helping Jackie out in stalling Po Kong after being released, as Uncle and Tohru make their way to them with a spell to send the demon back into their portal.
21	8	"The Curse of El Chupacabra"	Phil Weinstein	Mark Seidenberg	October 15, 2001
Jackie and Jade find themselves called to Mexico by El Toro, when needs his friends to help him deal with the legendary El Chupacabra. However, in their efforts to defeat the creature, El Toro is inadvertently scratched by it, causing him to be cursed to change into El Chupacabra at night and unable to step out into sunlight. Jackie and Jade finds themselves calling upon Uncle to create an antidote, before El Toro can bring harm to others in his predicament.
22	9	"Rumble in the Big House"	Alan Caldwell	Alexx Van Dyne	October 20, 2001
Upon learning that the demon portal to Xiao Fung, a demon who holds power over wind, is located somewhere within a maximum-security prison, Shendu forces Valmont and the Dark Hand to commit a petty crime in order to infiltrate the facility. Suspecting they are up to something, Captain Black has Jackie go undercover as a prisoner to discover their plans. When he realizes what they are up to, Jackie is forced to do what he can to disrupt Xiao Fung's escape, until Uncle and Tohru can bring the spell needed to entrap him again.
23	10	"Lost City of the Muntabs"	Chap Yaep	Patti Carr & Lara Runnels	October 22, 2001
Jackie and Jade find themselves assisting millionaire John Smith in his search for an ancient civilization of Muntabs, unaware he plans to steal their secrets for living long lives. When he realizes that Smith's theft will doom the Muntabs, Jackie is forced to prevent Smith from escaping and returning the Muntabs' secret before the damage is permanent.
24	11	"And He Does His Own Stunts"	Gary Hartle	Andrew Robinson	October 27, 2001
The Chans travel to Los Angeles when they learn that the Dark Hand have uncovered the demon portal connected to Tchang Zhu, a demon who holds power over lightning and storms, within the city. During their mission to stop them, Jade decides to see if she can make Jackie a famous film star. However, she is forced to put her plans on hold indefinitely when the Dark Hand release Tchang Zhu on Hollywood, forcing her uncle to keep him distracted while the spell needed to imprison him is completed.
25	12	"Showdown in the Old West"	Andy Thom	Dean Stefan	October 29, 2001
Jackie, Jade and Uncle visit a ghost town of the Old West, where they find a book during their exploration that contains a story related to Jackie's ancestor, a Chinese railroad worker. Interested, the group spend time hearing Jackie retell the story to them, detailing how his ancestor unexpectedly became the sheriff of the town, and had to deal with bandits that plagued it with the help of new allies, all of whom Jackie bases on his friends and enemies.
26	13	"Queen of the Shadowkhan"	Michael Goguen	David Slack	November 3, 2001
Jackie manages to retrieve an old spellbook on demonic magic from within Shendu's palace, containing the secrets behind his Shadowkhan warriors. When Jade desires a tattoo to outdo a classmate, she decides to copy the image on the spellbook's front cover to her leg, inadvertently granting her the power to control the Shadowkhan. However, Jackie and Uncle realize that this action will also corrupt her into an evil demonic power, forcing them to find a way to remove the tattoo. As Jade succumbs to darkness and takes control of Section 13 with the spellbook, they find themselves in a race against time to save her and prevent Shendu from reclaiming his lost property.
27	14	"Origami"	Chris Berkeley	Henry Gilroy	November 5, 2001
Jackie travels to Paris to authenticate some Oriental artwork at a major art gallery. However, he quickly finds himself dealing with an art thief who possess the magical ability to fold his body with origami into any shape and form. Jade swiftly calls in help from Viper to investigate who the thief is, despite his mistrust towards his ally's past. He soon realizes she is his only hope of stopping the thief, especially when they discover his true identity.
28	15	"Shanghai Moon"	Chuck Drost	Alexx Van Dyne	November 10, 2001
Discovering the demon portal to Tso Lan, a demon with dominion over the moon, is located in space, Shendu forces the Dark Hand to steal a space shuttle from Cape Canaveral. Jackie and Jade stow away on their shuttle during lift-off, and find themselves not only forced to send Tso Lan back into his portal, but prevent him from altering the gravitational power of the moon with his demonic magic before it can affect the Earth.
29	16	"The Lotus Temple"	Michael Chang	Jan Strnad	November 12, 2001
Jackie and Jade journey with a monk to find a lost temple said to contain ancient wisdom. While camping one night, Jade wanders off and finds the temple, and a young girl who happens to be cursed to serve it as its guardian. When Jackie tracks her down and discovers that the monk plans to steal the magical knowledge the temple contains, he soon finds himself forced to stop him, while helping Jade rescue the young girl from her curse.
30	17	"Armor of the Gods"	Sean Song	Dave Collard & Ken Goin	November 17, 2001
Jackie manages to excavate a suit of ancient armor that Uncle discovers to be the same armor used by the warriors that imprisoned Shendu and his demonic brethren. At his suggestion, Jackie is forced to take the armor with him to Spain for protection, especially when the Dark Hand discover the demon portal for Dai Gui, a demon with dominion over the ground, within the country. However, imprisoning him back into his portal is complicated when Jackie discovers Jade used a sleeping potion on Uncle due to his constant complaining without realizing the trouble it could cause.
31	18	"Agent Tag"	Chap Yaep & Seung Kim	Jan Strnad	November 19, 2001
Section 13 sends its best field agent, Tagert McStone, to investigate and thwart the schemes of notorious master criminal Dr. Necrosis. Eager to see him in action, Jade stows away on his helicopter, forcing Jackie to chase after them. A freak accident soon incapacitates McStone, forcing Jade and Jackie to complete his mission, whereupon they discover that Necrosis' plan involves the use of a magic artifact to create a powerful doomsday weapon.
32	19	"Tale of the Demon Tail / Demon in Di-Skies"	Gary Hartle	Hilary Bader	November 24, 2001
The Dark Hand manage to release Hsi Wu, a demon with dominion over the sky, from his portal at Fenway Park, before the Chans can send him back through it. However, in his attempt to escape, Hsi Wu loses his tail in a freak accident, to which Uncle seals it behind chi magic until he can use it to locate him. To restore himself, the demon disguises himself as a human boy in order to win over Jade and steal back his tail. When Jade discovers his deception, she soon seeks revenge on Hsi Wu when Uncle is kidnapped by the demon.
33	20	"The Return of the Pussycat"	Chuck Drost	Mark Seidenberg	December 1, 2001
Annoyed that her uncle will not see her theatrical debut, Jade decides to use the Tiger Talisman on Jackie, taking his yang counterpart with her to watch her performance. His yin counterpart is left to join with Uncle to explore a recently exposed cavern holding part of San Francisco that was submerged in an earthquake in 1906. However, the pair's exploration comes across the prison of Spring-heeled Jack in an old museum who is accidentally released and begins to cause chaos. Jade is soon forced to bring Jackie's yin and yang counterparts together to stop the creature from devouring the descendants of the person who imprisoned him, especially when it turns out to be one of her classmates.
34	21	"Scouts Honor"	Andy Thom	William Forrest Cluverius	December 8, 2001
On an expedition to find an archaeological site under Venice, Jackie finds an ancient necklace that can magically teleport its user to any location they desire via a special command phrase. However, he swiftly discovers a treasure hunter is after it to steal treasures from around the world, and is only lucky to escape them. When he returns home, Jackie decides to sign Jade up to join a scout group to give her more activities and agrees to accompany them on a camping trip. But unknown to the pair, the treasure hunter is on their tail, hoping to reclaim the necklace, especially when Jade discreetly takes it with them.
35	22	"Danger in the Deep Freeze"	Michael Chang	Patti Carr & Lara Runnels	December 15, 2001
On an expedition to the North Pole, Jackie and Jade uncover the frozen body of an abominable snowman, unaware the local Inuit in the region seek to prevent its removal. When Jade releases it from its ice captivity, whilst Uncle, Jackie and Tohru investigate some ancient Inuit writing found with the creature, the group are forced to find it when they discover it to be a good spirit creature. They soon discover a notorious relic hunter who steals artifacts is eager to acquire it after tricking the Inuit about the creature, forcing Jackie to stop them leaving with the snowman.
36	23	"Into The Mouth of the Evil"	Phil Weinstein	Steven Melching	January 19, 2002
When Jackie rescues a museum curator he is meeting in New Delhi from thugs, a freak accident forces him to visit their dentist for a new filling. However, unknown to him, the curator is attempting to smuggle a magical artifact that can drain the Ganges River of its water, right under the powerful mental powers of an Indian monk and his order. When Jackie realizes the deception upon travelling to Calcutta for an important conference with Jade, the pair find themselves forced to thwart the curator's scheme before irreversible damage is done to those who rely on the river for the livelihoods.
37	24	"The King and Jade"	Chap Yaep	Steven Melching	January 26, 2002
Captain Black assigns Jackie to bodyguard Lee-Li, a young Asian king who is visiting San Francisco on a diplomatic trip. Jade, eager to discover what they are like, borrows the Snake Talisman to get a glimpse of the king's life, but finds he is miserable because of his royal duties. Jade soon offers to help Lee-Li duck his duties, despite the fact that someone is out to kidnap him. When the king is eventually taken after Jackie discovers what Jade did, both the Chans are forced to help rescue Lee-Li and expose the traitor amongst his servants who betrayed him.
38	25	"The New Atlantis"	Alan Caldwell	David Slack	February 2, 2002
The Dark Hand releases Bai Tza, a demon with dominion over the seas, from her demon portal in Rome, whereupon she discovers that her old kingdom is in ruins, she makes plans transform to San Francisco into her new kingdom. During this time, Valmont manages to knock out Shendu's spirit and calls upon the Chans for help to exorcise him from his body, in exchange for Bai Tza's location. Although Valmont is true to his words, the Chans swiftly discover Bai Tza is planning to trigger an earthquake to sink the city into the sea. While they are forced to prevent this, they are unable to help Valmont before Shendu recovers.
39	26	"The Eighth Door"	Gary Hartle	Hilary J. Bader	February 9, 2002
Although the Chans finally manage to imprison Bai Tza after she escaped them, a freak accident causes Jade to be caught in Uncle's spell, dragging her into the demon realm. To rescue her, Jackie discovers he must find the demon portal connected to Shendu, which requires stealing the artifact that the Dark Hand have relied upon. After Uncle manages to communicate with Jade on how to use it, the group rush to open the portal, not only to recover Jade – who finds herself forced to keep any one of the demons they encountered from managing to escape – but also to send Shendu's spirit back when Uncle finally creates an exorcism spell to free Valmont from the demonic dragon's hold. In the end, Jade wanted to visit Moose World after being reunited with her family and friend, and Jackie reluctantly allows it, and the four stay in Hong Kong a bit longer, while Valmont celebrates his liberation from Shendu. As for the Fire Demon, he is less than thrilled, as the other demons close in on him in their wrath.
40	27	"Demon World (Part 1)"	Chris Berkeley	David Slack	February 16, 2002
Facing punishment from his demonic brethren, Shendu manages to convince them to give him one last chance to undo their defeats. Escaping from his prison, Shendu swiftly possess Jackie and heads for Australia to find a hidden temple housing the Book of Ages – a magical artifact that records history and which can alter reality if tampered with. Although the Chans attempt to stop him, Shendu manages to rewrite history, unaware that Jade tore part of a page containing her history. Discovering herself in an alternate reality ruled over by Shendu and his demonic brethren, Jade is forced to find her family and convince them to help her restore the world. However, they soon face trouble when Shendu discovers them stealing the talismans containing his power.
41	28	"Demon World (Part 2)"	Sean Song	David Slack	February 23, 2002
Jade, Uncle, and Jackie escape from Shendu's palace with a few talismans taken from the demonic dragon. With Jade's memory, they swiftly begin seeking their friends across the world, to help them gain access to the Book of Ages. At the same time, they also work to seal away some of the demons using the same spells as before. Shendu swiftly discovers how his plan is being undone, and leads the remaining demons to Australia to prevent Jade undoing his changes to history, culminating in a major fight for control of the Book.
42	29	"Enter the Cat"	Michael Chang	Dean Stefan	March 2, 2002
Jackie and Jade find themselves coming across a highly valuable cat statue, only for Valmont to steal it from him. However, the statue scratches him, passing on a magical curse that swiftly turns him into a humanoid feline. Jackie soon discovers another collector is after it, and swiftly becomes caught up in a struggle for ownership that causes Jade to be cursed by accident. To remove the curse on both, Jackie is forced to decrypt the riddle on the statue concerning the cure.
43	30	"Pleasure Cruise"	Alan Caldwell	Patti Carr & Lara Runnels	March 9, 2002
To safeguard a rare and valuable Chinese dragon figurine, Jackie arranges for it to be transported in a secure vault on a cruise ship. Because of this arrangement, Jackie decides to bring along Uncle, Jade, and Tohru and his mother to enjoy a cruise in the process. Discovering Tohru gets seasick, Jade borrows the Horse Talisman to help him overcome it, which soon comes in handy when the criminals who tried to steal the figurine in a previous attempt, hijack the cruise ship.
44	31	"Tough Luck"	Andy Thom	Rob Hoegee	March 16, 2002
Valmont's enforcers, Finn, Chow and Ratso, quit the Dark Hand after one too many failed crimes, and decide to start their own organization. The group swiftly decide to steal an emerald that Jade had bought from a traveller, unaware that it bestows a curse of bad luck to those who willingly accept it. Jackie soon becomes cursed when Jade gives it to him, and finds the only way to remove the curse is to return the gem to its original home in Ireland where it was stolen from. As he finds himself contending with the bad luck, especially during St. Patrick's Day, he also must deal with Finn, Ratso and Chow as they attempt to steal the emerald from him.
45	32	"The Chosen One"	Phil Weinstein	Adam Beechen	March 23, 2002
The Chans are surprised when monks from the Ben-Shui monastery arrive in San Francisco, and reveal that Tohru is prophesied to become the mystical leader of their order. Agreeing to travel with him to discover more of the prophecy in question, the group soon discover that a powerful dark wizard, Daolon Wong, has plans to kidnap him in order to prevent his prophesied powers from awakening. Jackie soon finds himself having to protect Tohru when he learns the monks won't let him fight, especially against Wong's dark magic demon warriors.
46	33	"Glove Story"	Gary Hartle	Brian Kaplan	March 30, 2002
Jackie narrowly escapes a pair of modern-day Scottish pirates while on an expedition to find the treasure of a notorious pirate, but is curious over a pair of gloves that was part of it. The day after his return, Tohru is arrested by police when stolen gems turn up in Uncle's shop. The Chans are soon shocked to discover that Tohru was mistakenly blamed for the thefts, when they discover the gloves are magically enchanted and intent on stealing back their owner's treasure. Jackie soon has to rescue Tohru when the gloves attempt to use him for their plans, with the matter complicated when the Scottish pirates turn up to steal the treasure for themselves.
47	34	"The Chan Who Knew Too Much"	Gary Hartle	Adam Beechen	April 27, 2002
Jackie and Jade travel to London to investigate the disappearance of Stonehenge, but get more than they bargain for when they unwittingly come across the thieves – druids from an ancient order, who are intent on keeping their existence a secret. The pair soon have their hands full when they discover just how extensive the druidic order is, but must do what they can to stop them when it becomes clear they intend to use Stonehenge to bring about the destruction of London.
48	35	"Chi of the Vampire"	Chap Yaep	Rob Hoegee & Adam Beechen	May 4, 2002
On a trip to buy antiques for the store, the Chans accidentally release Jiangshi – a vampiric monster that grows stronger from stealing the chi of living creatures, granting it the power to resist sunlight and the power of its victims. When Tohru is attacked and loses some of his chi, Uncle infuses him with some of Jade's, causing him to exhibit some of her personality. When Jade suffers the same problem, she is given some of Uncle's chi, gaining his wisdom as a result. Jackie is soon forced to protect them from Uncle, when the monster consumes his chi completely and turning him into a Jiangshi, while Jade works on creating a spell to defeat it and heal its victims.
49	36	"The Good, the Bad, the Blind, the Deaf and the Mute"	Phil Weinstein	Steven Melching	May 18, 2002
Daolon Wong concocts a plan to utilise the dark magic within a stone idol that can rob people of their speech, sight and hearing. Wong swiftly targets the Chans as revenge for his earlier defeat, kidnapping Uncle, while making Jackie mute, Jade deaf, and Tohru blind. All three find themselves relying not only on their other senses, but also on each other to stop Wong, before all of China is victimized by the dark wizard's scheme.
50	37	"Shrink Rap"	Alan Caldwell	Alexx Van Dyne	August 17, 2002
In India, Jackie manages to recover a pair of magical armbands connected to the god Shiva, which grant its user extra arms, thwarting Hak Foo's plans to acquire them for himself. When Hak Foo pursues him back to Uncle's shop to steal them back, Jade attempts to help with a spell, but accidentally shrinks both him and Jackie to the size of ants. Both men soon struggle for control of the armbands, as they tackle the dangers they must now face at their new size, while Uncle works to reverse Jade's spell.
51	38	"I'll Be A Monkey's Puppet"	Chris Berkeley	Alexx Van Dyne	August 24, 2002
To help Jade with a talent competition at school, Jackie buys a puppet of the Monkey King for her to practice ventriloquism, unaware it is actually a magical prison for the mischievous being itself. When the Monkey King is released by accident, he makes his move to cause mischief, but not before Jackie is turned into a puppet. Jade swiftly reanimates him with the Rat Talisman in hopes they stop the mischievous monkey from causing trouble, while Uncle works to find a way to imprison the Monkey King and return Jackie to normal.
52	39	"The Amazing T-Girl"	Chuck Drost	Hilary J. Bader	September 7, 2002
Captain Black's superiors force him to remove the talismans from Section 13's vault, leading Uncle to recommend that they should be moved to the Ben-Shui monastery for safe-keeping. When Jade decides to have fun with them one last time before their transfer by Jackie, Uncle and Black, a freak accident during the rewiring of the vault's security system causes her to absorb their power. This soon puts her in danger when Daolon Wong makes his move to steal their power for himself, leaving the others to mount a rescue before Wong can complete his latest plan.

=== Season 3 (2002–03) ===
No. overall	No. in season	Title	Directed by	Written by	Original release date
53	1	"Re-Enter the J-Team"	Christopher Berkeley	Duane Capizzi	September 14, 2002
Captain Black recruits the J-Team to assist him investigate Taiwanese billionaire Chang, who is suspected of masterminding the theft of jade figurines from several Chinese museums. To uncover evidence of his crimes, Jackie and his allies find themselves entering a fight tournament arranged by Chang at his island mansion, who seeks the most worthy fighters to be his bodyguard. However, only Tohru manages to win his match in the tournament, but the investigation is soon complicated when Jade tries to prove herself by tailing Tohru into Chang's private chambers.: Note: The plot is loosely based on that for the Bruce Lee's film Enter the Dragon.
54	2	"The Powers Unleashed"	Michael Goguen	David Slack	September 21, 2002
Daolon Wong travels to San Francisco to steal the power of the twelve talismans after his previous defeat, just as Valmont orders his Dark Hand enforcers to do the same. Jackie quickly destroys the talismans in hopes of preventing this, only for Uncle to reveal that the powers they contain will instead scatter around the world and into twelve animals connected to the Chinese zodiac. Jackie soon find themselves seeking out the powers of the Dog Talisman at a dog show. However, he soon discovers that after Uncle imprisoned his magical warriors, Wong has enslaved Valmont's enforcers to become his new demon warriors, which complicates his task when a stray dog is discovered to hold the talisman power.
55	3	"Viva Las Jackies"	Seung-Eun Kim	David Slack	September 28, 2002
The Chans find themselves travelling to Las Vegas to find the power of the Tiger Talisman, which they discover to be within a white tiger used in a major performance on the Vegas casino strip. When Wong shows up to steal the tiger, the power within it activates and not only separates the zodiac animal into its yin and yang counterparts, but partially split's Jackie's own counterparts into two separate heads sharing the same body. The two sides find themselves forced to stop Wong and recover the tiger's counterparts quickly, before he can acquire its power.
56	4	"Aztec Rat Race"	Michael Chang	Adam Beechen	October 5, 2002
Jacke and Jade team up with El Toro and Paco when the power of the Rat Talisman is discovered to be in Mexico. They soon discover it be within a rat hiding in a hidden silver shrine to the Mayan god Quetzalcoatl. However, a freak accident causes the power to become active and reanimate a statue of the god, who mistakes Jade and El Toro as fellow gods. Jackie is forced to find a way to explain the truth to Quetzalcoatl of his return, when Wong arrives in the area to absorb the talisman power from the rat.
57	5	"Monkey a Go-Go"	Christopher Berkeley	Alexx Van Dyne	October 12, 2002
The Chans discover that the power of the Monkey Talisman has gone to Hawaii, whereupon they find it has been bestowed to a monkey owned by a local businessman. Unbeknown to them, the Monkey King has returned to life after his puppet is found by a construction worker, and is intent on getting his revenge on the Chans for thwarting his plans. Jackie soon has to rescue the monkey from the Monkey King when he interferes, causing its power to activate and create chaos in the process. The matter is soon made worse when Wong turns up, leading to a three-way battle over control of the zodiac animal.
58	6	"When Pigs Fly"	Michael Goguen	David Slack	October 19, 2002
After recovering the rooster that acquired the power of the Rooster Talisman, Jackie and Jade are instructed by Uncle to head to Kansas, before they can return with the animal. Once there, they learn that a pig owned by a local farmer has acquired the power of the Pig Talisman, and try everything to warn its owner of the danger it is in. However, the farmer refuses to accept their tale, and makes plans to steal the rooster when it manages to get free. Jackie is soon forced to make him realise the trouble he will be in, especially when Wong turns up to claim the power in both zodiac animals.
59	7	"Rabbit Run"	Seung Eun-Kim	Michael Jelenic	November 2, 2002
Jackie and Jade travel to Wyoming to find the rabbit with the power of the Rabbit Talisman, and discover it is the animal mascot and good-luck charm for a school football team. As Jackie works to convince the owner to let him take it, Jade spends her time trying to inspire confidence in a young member of the team, who has been denied a chance to prove himself. When the player witnesses the power in his team's mascot activate, he swiftly attempts to use it to finally be involved in a big football match. Jackie and Jade soon have to protect him when Wong arrives to claim the zodiac animal's power during the match.
60	8	"Sheep In, Sheep Out"	Michael Chang	Louis Hirshorn & Joelle Sellner	November 9, 2002
The Chans and Wong fight against each other to secure the power of the Sheep Talisman from a sheep found in Scotland. When its power activates, Jackie and Jade are forced to use their astral forms to convince the zodiac animal to help them. However, Wong replaces his enslaved enforcers with the Shadowkhan, who he sends to kidnap Uncle for interrogation about the other zodiac animals, resulting in Jackie and Jade returning their astral forms into the wrong bodies. With no choice but to rescue Uncle before Wong can extract the information he needs, the pair are forced to adapt to each other's body in order to save him.
61	9	"The Invisible Mom"	Christopher Berkeley	Brian Kaplan	November 16, 2002
The Chans are surprised when Tohru invites his mother to see him in India, unexpectedly, while they are searching for the power of the Snake Talisman. The group soon find it within an unhatched snake egg and secure it, after deceiving the Enforcers into taking a regular snake instead. However, Tohru's mother accidentally dips it into a headache remedy she makes and soon becomes invisible as a result. She quickly takes advantage of the situation to pester Uncle due to their rivalry, but also to protect her son even more despite Tohru confessing to Jade that he dislikes this. However, when the Enforcers return to claim the egg and the zodiac animal within, Tohru's mother tries to help keep it safe but makes the situation worse instead.
62	10	"A Jolly J-Team Xmas"	Michael Goguen	Alexx Van Dyne	December 14, 2002
Daolon Wong makes plans to steal the chi of Santa Claus during Christmas, which threatens the festive holiday. To prevent this, his elves seek out help from amongst Wong's enemies, leading to the J-Team heading to the North Pole to thwart the dark wizard's plans and save Christmas.
63	11	"Little Valmont, Big Jade"	Seung-Eun Kim & Brandon Vietti	David Slack	January 25, 2003
The Chans find themselves heading to London to find the power of the Horse Talisman, which they discover within a racehorse. To their surprise, they find Valmont is seeking it in order to undo a curse that turned him into a child, when he confronted Wong for stealing his enforcers and insulting the dark wizard in the process. While Jackie works to recover the zodiac animal when Wong turns up, Jade gets into trouble when she casts a spell that will make her older, but instead makes her bigger.
64	12	"The Ox-Head Incident"	Michael Chang	Michael Jelenic	February 8, 2003
Uncle locates the power of the Ox Talisman to a yak within the Himalayan Mountains, whereupon he instructs the others to bring it to the Ben-Shui monastery so he can test a spell to transfer its power to a new vessel. However, the group are shocked when Hak Foo, who wanted the power for himself and attempted to stop Wong, has been transformed by the dark wizard as a new demon warrior after the recent defeat of the Enforcers. Although Uncle is able to transfer the power to a new vessel while in spiritual form, Wong steals this in hopes of locating the power. Jackie and Jade are forced to rescue him to locate the missing power, especially when Foo's new form proves tougher to beat.
65	13	"Animal Crackers"	Michael Goguen	Adam Beechen	February 15, 2003
Having secured most of the zodiac animals containing the power of the talismans, Jade is forced to return to school while Uncle works to find new vessels for their power. After being humiliated by one of her classmates about her stories of her adventures, Jade decides sneak out the animals from Section 13 to show off at a school fair. However, she soon provides Wong an opportunity to acquire their power, especially when the animals are spooked by accident and start causing havoc in the area.
66	14	"Tohru Who?"	Michael Chang	Joelle Sellner & Louis Hirshorn	March 1, 2003
Valmont manages to wipe Tohru's memories with a potion, before tricking him into believing he is still his loyal enforcer in the Dark Hand. With Tohru under his control, Valmont makes plans to steal a rare, valuable golden statue in Asia in hopes of rebuilding his criminal empire. The Chans swiftly pursue after them, not only to prevent the theft, but to also get back Tohru by proving that Valmont is lying to him.
67	15	"Re-Enter the Dragon"	Christopher Berkeley	David Slack	March 8, 2003
Seeking to acquire the power of the Dragon Talisman, Daolon Wong strikes a deal with Shendu for his help in exchange for resurrecting him. The Chans swiftly discover what he is up to, but are unable to prevent the demonic dragon's resurrection, whereupon he double-crosses Wong to regain the Dragon Talisman's power and those the dark wizard acquired. Jackie and Jade find themselves forced to protect the other zodiac animals from Shendu at all costs as he tries to reclaim the powers they hold. Uncle soon realizes that Wong is the only one who knows how to stop him, and is forced to conjure a spell that can drain him of his dark magic and remove the demonic chi that transformed the Enforcers into his warriors.
68	16	"A Night at the Opera"	Seung-Eun Kim	Alexx Van Dyne & Adam Beechen	April 5, 2003
Uncle brings his family out for the night to witness a show by his old opera troop, led by an old friend of his. Later that night, Jackie attends to an important relic exhibition, only to witness thieves manage to steal several exhibits despite his best efforts at stopping them. When Jade reveals that the thieves are members of the troop, using a secret makeup that allows those who use it to magically move through walls, Jackie is forced to expose the culprits, when Uncle is unable to convince his friend that certain members of his troop have betrayed his trust.
69	17	"Attack of the J-Clones"	Michael Goguen	Michael Jelenic	May 3, 2003
The J-Team are shocked when it appears Viper has returned to her former life of crime following a break-in at a museum, until they discover evidence that it was a magical clone. When Jackie and Black discover that Chang has escaped from prison, after being convicted of his crimes, the J-Team realize he is using magical clones of the group to seek his revenge against them. Uncle is forced to figure out how the clones were made, in order to find a way for the group to defeat Chang.

=== Season 4 (2003–04) ===
No. overall	No. in season	Title	Directed by	Written by	Original release date
70	1	"The Mask of the Shadowkhan"	Frank Squillace	Michael Jelenic	September 13, 2003
In prison, Daolon Wong and the Enforcers accidentally summon the demon Tarakudo while attempting to escape. When the Chans discover this after hearing that the Enforcers broke out of jail, they swiftly pursue after the demon to Shendu's palace, whom Tohru recognises from Japanese folklore. At the palace, despite Uncle believing him to be Chinese, Tarakudo reveals himself to be ruler of the Oni, a group of Japanese demons that terrorized the world with nine tribes of Shadowkhan, also Japanese, until ancient warriors imprisoned each tribe's Oni general into a mask. When Chow ends up wearing the Oni mask that Shendu had been using to control the ninja Shadowkhan, Tohru finds himself being the only one to provide information on a spell that can remove it from him.
71	2	"Samurai Ratso"	Seung Eun Kim	Story by : Duane Capizzi, Louis Hirshorn & Joelle Sellner; Teleplay by : Duane Capizzi	September 20, 2003
Travelling to Japan, the Chans work to find the second Oni mask that Tarakudo seeks. However, Ratso finds it and gains control over its tribe of swift razor-handed Shadowkhan. Uncle soon discovers the spell he used before will not work, to which Tohru points out that the only way to deal with the Oni masks is to find a set of Hana Fuda cards, as they provide information on the location of each mask and a key ingredient for the spell to remove it from its wearer. Uncle soon feels useless because Tohru is more knowledgeable on the subject and prepares to leave. However, he is soon forced to return to his family, as they face trouble recovering the cards owned by a car factory owner.
72	3	"The Amazing T-Troop"	David Hartman	Adam Beechen	September 27, 2003
Although the Chans manage to recover the third Oni mask, Jade's pet dog – whom she adopted after the zodiac animals affair – accidentally wears the mask when Tarakudo and the Enforcers come to claim it. When the dog begins exhibiting control over the mask's flying Shadowkhan, Uncle and Tohru find themselves working to devise the necessary removal spell, while Jackie and Jade keep the animal confined. When Tarakudo manages to slowly begin influencing the darkness in the animal, Jade relies on the power of a few talismans and some old friends to help even the odds until her dog can be saved.
73	4	"The Black Magic"	Brandon Vietti	Tom Pugsley & Greg Klein	October 4, 2003
While aiding the Chans in obtaining the fourth Oni mask, Captain Black unwittingly ends up wearing it. Although he slowly enjoys the power it gives him and the sumo Shadowkhan tribe it controls, Jackie and Jade become concerned that the mask is corrupting him when he begins harshly arresting people on minor crimes. When it becomes clear Black has turned evil, Jade swiftly uses the Tiger Talisman on him, granting his yang counterpart with a few talismans so that he can help Jackie keep his yin counterpart trapped, until Uncle and Tohru can bring the removal spell needed to remove the mask.
74	5	"The Demon Behind"	Bob Hathcock	David Slack	October 11, 2003
Following the recovery of the fifth Oni mask, an argument between Tohru and Uncle leads to each not speaking with the other. In the meantime, Jade decides to use the Rat Talisman on the fifth mask in the hopes that the Chans can interrogate the mask's demon, Ikazuki, about the other masks. However, this soon causes trouble when Ikazuki manages to escape Section 13, and winds up being worn by Finn when he sits upon the mask. After Tohru is abducted by Ikazuki's samurai Shadowkhan, Uncle is forced to help Jackie save his apprentice and remove the talisman power from the mask, before Ikazuki uses the removal spell that Tohru was in possession of.
75	6	"Fright Fight Night"	Seung-Eun Kim	Alexx Van Dyne	October 25, 2003
Paco and El Toro arrive in San Francisco to celebrate Halloween with the Chans, who have just recently returned home with the sixth Oni mask. Discouraged by the way he is treated, Paco decides to use the mask to create a frightening Halloween costume. However, its evil slowly corrupts him and give him the power of its squid-like Shadowkhan tribe. As Uncle and Tohru hunt down the ingredient needed for the removal spell, after accidentally losing it, Jackie and El Toro work together to convince Paco to remove the mask, especially when Tarakudo attempts to take advantage of the situation.
76	7	"Half a Mask of Kung-Fu"	David Hartman	David Slack	November 1, 2003
The Chans and the Enforcers fight over the seventh Oni mask when it is placed online for auction. Both are surprised when Valmont turns out to have put in the winning bid for it, in hopes of summoning its crab-clawed Shadowkhan tribe to commit crimes. In the struggle to get it back, the mask is split in two, with Valmont putting on one half and gaining the ability to summon only half-Shadowkhan warriors of the tribe. Jade decides to wear the other half of the mask to counter him with the other half of the tribe's warriors. Both soon fight against the mask's evil when it asserts its dominance, forcing Jackie to track down the removal spell after it was accidentally dropped into a postal truck.
77	8	"The Shadow Eaters"	Brandon Vietti	Michael Jelenic	November 15, 2003
The Chans manage to find the eighth Oni mask within a psychic's swamp shack in Louisiana, but lose the Hana Fuda card detailing the spell ingredient for its removal in the process. This soon causes problems when they are unable to prevent Hak Foo wearing the mask and summoning its Shadowkhan tribe. Uncle swiftly discovers the new tribe is far more dangerous, as they gain power from eating the shadows of living people and putting them into a comatose state. As Jackie and Jade work to stop Hak Foo using his Shadowkhan to endanger all of San Francisco, Uncle attempts to discover what the required ingredient is as quickly as he can.
78	9	"The Good Guys"	Bob Hathcock	Adam Beechen	November 22, 2003
After a failed attempt at stealing a valuable statue, Finn, Ratso and Chow give up crime and arrive at Uncle's shop seeking to reform themselves. The Chans grant them a chance to prove themselves, with Tohru placed in charge of them. When Jackie finds he must transport a rare jewel to a local museum, a trio of masked thugs steal it for their own purpose. Jackie and Jade swiftly pursue after the culprits – Strikemaster Ice and his associates MC Cobra and DJ Fist – with unexpected help from Finn, Ratso and Chow.
79	10	"Déjà Vu"	Bob Hathcock	Raf Green	January 17, 2004
After Daolon Wong is released from prison for good behaviour, Jackie, Jade and Uncle head to an old temple in China to prevent him finding the Déjà Vu stone – a magical artifact that can allow one to relive events in their past and potentially change them. Knowing Wong will try to do this to reclaim his lost magic, Jackie attempts to stop him, only to cause both to relive events in their past. Jade and Uncle find themselves forced to help in some way, as Jackie tries to locate the event in his past that the artifact accidentally ended up in before Wong does.
80	11	"J2: Rise of the Dragons"	Seung-Eun Kim	Tom Pugsley & Greg Klein	January 31, 2004
While helping Uncle track down a large source of magical energy in a local junkyard, the Chans encounter a mysterious woman who reveals herself to be Jade's future self. Jackie and Jade discover that she is trying to prevent the revival of Shendu in the future by his son Drago – another demonic dragon who the energy readings came from – with the power of a set of Dragon teeth. Realizing that both his and his Uncle's future selves are in danger, Jackie works with Jade's future self to stop Drago and destroy the teeth, even if Jade is willing to risk her future to help as well.
81	12	"The J-Tots"	David Hartman	Michael Jelenic	February 7, 2004
Captain Black calls upon the J-Team to track down Chang after he manages to escape from prison, but warns them that he has formed a team of criminals, each of whom is the criminal counterpart of each team member. Jade, annoyed at being treated as a minor, attempts to use magic to gain seniority over the others, but unwittingly casts a spell that causes the group to revert to their toddler youth. As Uncle, who is also affected, attempts to undo the damage, the J-Team is forced to overcome their situation to prevent Chang from taking advantage of their predicament.
82	13	"Ninja Twilight"	Brandon Vietti	Eddie Guzelian	February 14, 2004
The Chans manage to track down the ninth and final Oni mask, and move it into Section 13's vault with the other masks. However, they become shocked when the masks shatter, unaware they were not meant to come together in one location, releasing the nine Oni demon generals within. Now free, the Oni swiftly begin using their Shadowkhan armies (including the ninth masks mantis-like Shadowkhan tribe) to cover the world in darkness. After the J-Team fails to stop them, the group discovers from the Hana Fuda cards that the only way to defeat the Oni is to find a tenth mask – one connected to Tarakudo. Tohru finds himself risking his life to find it hidden in the Shadow Realm, whereupon the J-Team learn it must be placed on Tarakudo's face in order to save the world.

=== Season 5 (2004–05) ===
No. overall	No. in season	Title	Directed by	Written by	Original release date
83	1	"Relics of Demons Past"	David Hartman	Tom Pugsley & Greg Klein	September 11, 2004
Uncle becomes concerned that an alignment of stars is a bad omen, and is soon proven right when Shendu's son Drago escapes from Section 13, after he was imprisoned there following his defeat. The Chans soon discover he seeks to absorb the demon chi of his father's demonic brethren from the weapons that imprisoned them. Jackie and Jade find themselves in a race to acquire the fan used to defeat the wind demon Xiao Feng, especially when Drago recruits help from the Enforcers despite their past failures.
84	2	"It's All in the Game"	Jay Oliva	Marsha F. Griffin	September 18, 2004
Uncle creates a special detector to locate the weapons containing demon chi, which soon has a reaction when a television game show portrays a key item for winning it – the gourd that imprisoned the water demon Bai Tza. The Chans decide to enter the competition, knowing that Drago will be on his way to recover the weapon, but have their hands full staying on the program against a resourceful family team.
85	3	"Black and White and Chi All Over"	Anthony Chun	Steven Melching	September 25, 2004
Drago recruits help from Strikemaster Ice and his associates after finding it hard to work solo, empowering the group with some of his demon chi. He soon tasks them with helping him to recover the flowers, one holding the chi of the earth demon Dai Gui, the other holding the chi of the moon demon Tso Lan. The Chans have their work cut out trying to prevent this, much to Jade's annoyance as it's her birthday. They soon discover that Uncle's chi collection device, the Chi-o-matic, is unable to hold more than one demon chi essence, providing a serious problem acquiring both demons' chi at the same time.
86	4	"Dragon Scouts"	Kalvin Lee	Dean Stefan	October 16, 2004
Following an attempt to steal a valuable gold statue while it is being transported to a museum, Captain Black and Jackie suspect the Enforcers are returning to a life of crime. However, Finn, Ratso and Chow claim they are innocent after being made to do community service, in hopes of reforming for the sake of their nephews. Jackie and Jade decide to keep a close eye on the trio, but soon discover that someone else is involved when another attempt is made on the statue.
87	5	"The Demon Beneath My Wings"	Kirk Van Wormer	Tom Pugsley & Greg Klein	June 4, 2005
Although the Chans manage to secure the flute containing the chi of the sky demon Hsi Wu, Uncle is unable to transfer it into the chi containment system at Section 13. This causes a problem when Jade takes the Chi-o-matic with her for a school field trip, and unwittingly allows the demon chi to escape and possess her teacher. Jackie and Uncle are soon forced to chase after it, especially when Drago sees another opportunity to absorb it.
88	6	"Mirror, Mirror"	Jay Oliva	Marty Isenberg	June 4, 2005
Uncle takes Jackie Jade and Tohru to see his old hometown, before it is submerged thanks to a new hydroelectric dam. While visiting, the Chans encounter a mirror that acts as a prison for four evil spirits, who can possess people and make their worst fears a reality. When Jackie accidentally allows the spirits to escape, the Chans find themselves forced to not only exorcise the spirits from their bodies, but entrap them in a new prison before they infect other people with their worst fears.
89	7	"Antler Action"	Anthony Chun	Adam Beechen	June 11, 2005
An earthquake breaks the containment unit freeing the demon chi. One of the Demon Chis ends up in a teenager named Larry who now uses the Demon Chi of Dai Gui, the Earth Demon, into becoming the hero he always dreamt of.
90	8	"Clash of the Titanics"	Kalvin Lee	Nicole Dubuc	June 11, 2005
While Uncle is suffering from a disease, the Chi of Tchang Zhu, the Thunder Demon, reveals itself to be aboard a sunken ship with the letters A-N-I-C in its name. Despite Jade's first reaction, it is not the Titanic, but a vessel called the Oceanic. The castanets with the Thunder Demon Chi lie in a sunken ship in the Arctic.
91	9	"Stealing Thunder"	Kirk Van Wormer	Greg Klein & Tom Pugsley	June 18, 2005
Drago discovers that lightning enhances his already impressive Thunder Demon Chi, leading him to take over Seattle's Space Needle and creates a powerful transforming rod to allow him to use the numerous bolts of electricity from a recent storm to destroy anything. Drago possesses the Thunder Demon Chi. He moves to a new base where he can increase his powers. The Chans must remove the Thunder Chi before it becomes permanently linked to Drago.
92	10	"Weight And See"	Jay Oliva	Marsha F. Griffin	June 18, 2005
The Immortal Weapons with the Demon Chi of Po Kong, the Mountain Demon are found. But they're mixed in with other normal items. The Mountain Demon Chi is absorbed by Tohru just as Drago decides to take a new approach to dealing with the Chans.
93	11	"The Powers That Be (Part 1)"	Kalvin Lee	Dean Stefan	June 25, 2005
Drago kidnaps Captain Black, Uncle and Jackie. He is willing to return them in exchange for the containment unit with all the Demon Chi.
94	12	"The Powers That Be (Part 2)"	Kirk Van Wormer	Steven Melching	June 25, 2005
Drago has all 8 Demon Chi, and begins to summon his demon brethren. With the ultimate threat, Section 13 must accept help from whoever is willing.
95	13	"J2 Revisited"	Anthony Chun	Dean Orion	July 8, 2005
While on vacation, the Chans recover half of an ancient mystical artifact known as the Chi Arcanum. It is stolen, so Jade follows the thief through a portal where she encounters her adult self.: Note: This is the final episode aired, but not the actual series finale. This episode aired out of order in order for the final two episodes of the series, The Power That Be - Part 1 and The Powers That Be - Part 2, to be aired together.

== See also ==
- List of Jackie Chan Adventures characters
