= Jackie Chan Adventures: Legend of the Dark Hand =

2001 video game

- Developer: Torus Games
- Publisher: Activision
- Producer: Kevin McIntosh
- Designer: Michael Solomons
- Programmer: Grant Davies
- Artist: Marcus Mestrow
- Writers: Jay Gordon; Brian Pass; Marc Tumdorf
- Composer: Manfred Linøner
- Platform: Game Boy Advance
- Release: NA: November 21, 2001; EU: November 30, 2001
- Genre: Beat 'em up
- Mode: Single-player

Jackie Chan Adventures: Legend of the Dark Hand is a 2001 beat 'em-up video game based on the animated series Jackie Chan Adventures, which focuses on a fictionalized version of Hong Kong action film star Jackie Chan. The game was developed by Torus Games, published by Activision and released for the Game Boy Advance on November 21, 2001 in North America and November 30, 2001 in Europe.

== Synopsis ==
The game incorporates the broad story arc from the show along with its main cast of characters, but centers on a unique subplot spanning ten levels. Jackie Chan must travel on a globe-trotting quest to retrieve eight sacred scrolls that bestow ancient kung fu powers before they can be claimed by the forces of evil.

== Reception ==
Reception

Aggregate score
Aggregator	Score
Metacritic	75/100

Review scores
Publication	Score
AllGame	3/5
GamesMaster	75%
GameSpot	8.3/10
GameSpy	83%
GameZone	8.2/10
IGN	7/10
Nintendo Power	4/5

The game received "generally favorable reviews" according to the review aggregation website Metacritic.
