= List of Jackie Chan Adventures characters =

This is a list of characters from the animated television series Jackie Chan Adventures.

== Protagonists ==
=== Main cast ===
- Jackie Chan (voiced by James Sie) is a fictionalized version of Jackie Chan within the animated series and portrayed by himself in the live-action segments. He works as an archaeologist and consultant for the secret government agency Section 13, alongside his friend Captain Black, and initially resides in San Francisco at Uncle's antique shop. At the start of the series, a young relative, Jade, arrives from Hong Kong to stay with them, adding a new dynamic to his life. Jackie possesses exceptional martial arts skills mirroring those of his real-life namesake. Beyond fighting, he is shown to be genuinely knowledgeable about ancient history, artifacts, and languages. He has signature lines such as "Bad day, bad day, bad day!" and "I'm sorry, I'll bring it back later!" that are notable parts of his characterization. Though usually portrayed as mild-mannered and reluctant toward violence, he is repeatedly drawn into dangerous situations to recover magical artifacts. Another recurring element is that he often comically injures his hands when striking hard surfaces, which he shakes off before continuing. He frequently improvises with everyday objects in combat and is often placed in awkward or dangerous situations from which he must escape—traits inspired by the real-life actor's films. In the recurring live-action "Hey, Jackie..." segments, the real Jackie Chan answers questions from young fans about his life, career, and Chinese culture.
- Jade Chan (voiced by Stacie Chan) is Jackie's eleven-year-old niece from Hong Kong. Although commonly referred to as his "niece" by multiple characters, including Jackie himself; Uncle says in the pilot episode "Your cousin Shen's girl from Hong Kong" to Jackie. In "The Warrior Incarnate" (season 2, episode 2), when Finn refers to Jackie as her uncle, Jade replies that their relationship is "by marriage" to Lo Pei. Jade is adventurously reckless and usually accompanies Jackie on his adventures, serving as his sidekick. A recurring comedic element involves her being told to stay somewhere safe, only to sneak along anyway. Although Jackie routinely objects to her involvement, Jade's unauthorized interventions frequently prove pivotal to the success of his missions. Lucy Liu voices a future version of the character in the episode "J2: Rise of the Dragons".
- Uncle (voiced by Sab Shimono) — Jackie refers to him as his uncle, and Uncle refers to Jackie as his nephew and to Jade as his great-niece. His real name is unknown, and he is referred to simply as "Uncle" by almost everyone in the series, including himself. He speaks with a thick Cantonese accent and often refers to himself in the third person. Uncle operates an antique store in San Francisco's Chinatown, where many of the group's adventures begin and which acts as a central base outside of Section 13. In "The Stronger Evil," after Jackie and Jade have moved from the shop into quarters at Section 13, Uncle refuses to let them move back, declaring, "You cannot move back! ...Where will Tohru sleep?" prompting Jade to reply, "Oh, well. Guess we'll just have to stay in our supersecret underground base."" In Season 2, Tohru—who defected from the Dark Hand at the end of Season 1—becomes Uncle's apprentice in chi sorcery and begins living and working at the shop. Uncle is a wise sage and researcher of magic. When casting magic, he uses the Cantonese incantation "Yu Mo Gui Gwai Fai Di Zao", which translates to "Evil demons and malevolent spirits, be gone!". According to Jackie Chan in the live-action "Hey, Jackie..." segments, the character of Uncle was inspired by his real-life father, Charles Chan, and his long-time manager, Willie Chan. Uncle is known for his catchphrase "One more thing!" and disciplining Jackie with a sharp smack to the head.
- Tohru (voiced by Noah Nelson) is a large Japanese man with a sumo wrestler's build who fights using sumo-style techniques. He is introduced as an enforcer for the Dark Hand in Season 1, but reforms and becomes an ally to the Chans in the season one finale, "Day of the Dragon." He ends up serving as Uncle's apprentice in chi sorcery. Tohru's mother appears in several episodes; she initially disapproves of his decision to leave the Dark Hand for Uncle's shop, having believed Valmont was a respectable employer, but she eventually accepts his new life with the Chans. Much to Tohru's dismay, she frequently bickers with Uncle, whom Tohru regards as his sensei. According to Jackie Chan in the "Hey, Jackie..." segments, Tohru is based on members of his stunt team as well as himself.

=== Section 13 ===
Section 13 is a secret government agency led by Captain Black that Jackie works for.

- Captain Augustus Black (voiced by Clancy Brown) is the leader of Section 13 and a longtime friend of Jackie. A skilled crime-fighting specialist, he is initially skeptical of magic but gradually assists the Chan family in dealing with magical threats, though he often struggles to convince his superiors that magic is real.
- Kepler (voiced by John DiMaggio) is an engineer and inventor at Section 13 who remains skeptical of magic and is often too focused on his work to notice events happening around him. He creates several useful inventions for the Chans, including a jetpack and chronoton beams.
- Taggart McStone (voiced by Christopher Daniel Barnes) is a legendary agent of Section 13 who was believed to have retired, but is later revealed to have remained in the organization in disguise until the emergence of Ashby Necrosis.

=== Recurring ===
- El Toro Fuerte (voiced by Miguel Sandoval) is a Mexican luchador who takes great pride in never removing his mask and fighting honorably. His initial introduction in season one involves internal conflict as he used the Ox Talisman's power of super strength to gain an unfair advantage in becoming a wrestling champion. He returns in season two and becomes a member of the J-Team.
- Paco (voiced by Franco Velez) is a young Mexican boy and a devoted fan of El Toro Fuerte. He maintains a friendly rivalry with Jade, where they often argue which of their heroes is better.
- Viper (voiced by Susan Eisenberg) is a skilled martial artist who initially operates as a thief. She is introduced in season one as a one-time villain. After crossing paths with Jackie, she reforms and later becomes a member of the J-Team in season two. Viper is portrayed as flirtatious and serves as an occasional love interest for Jackie.
- Super Moose (voiced by Clancy Brown) is an in-universe comic book superhero. He is an anthropomorphic moose who can fly. Jade owns a plush of him that is occasionally brought to life using the Rat Talisman's power of animation.
- Tohru's mother (voiced by Amy Hill) is the unnamed mother of Tohru. She is often overprotective of her son and is shown to be stern but caring. A recurring highlight of her character is her bitter, comedic rivalry with Uncle.
- The Noble Animals are twelve living animals from the Chinese zodiac. When the Talismans are destroyed at the beginning of season three, the animals are endowed with the respective powers of each Talisman and act as living hosts.

=== Others ===
- Lo Pei (voiced by David Carradine) is an ancient warrior responsible for imprisoning Shendu in stone centuries ago and creating the Talismans. He is briefly brought back to life when Jade uses the Rat Talisman to animate a terracotta statue of him. In 'The Warrior Incarnate,' the Dark Hand tried to guise themselves as Lo Pei's allies, and attempted to discredit Jade with Lo Pei by revealing her connection to Jackie, who had encountered and fought with Lo Pei at Alcatraz in an earlier part of the episode. Their guise was almost successful, but ultimately failed when Lo Pei observed the Dark Hand's treatment of Jade firsthand: "A sacred warrior would never harm a child. You are impostors!""The Warrior Incarnate". Jackie Chan Adventures. Season 2. Episode 2. September 15, 2001. Kids' WB.
- Drew (voiced by Jeannie Elias) is Jade's schoolmate who is often dismissive of her claims about supernatural adventures.
- Miss Hardman (voiced by Jeannie Elias) is the schoolteacher in charge of Jade and Drew's class. She is nicknamed "Miss Heartless" by Jade due to her no-nonsense attitude. During the hunt for the scattered demon chi, Miss Hardman is briefly transformed into a sky demon by Hsi Wu's chi.
- Quetzalcoatl (voiced by Art Bonilla) is an Aztec deity temporarily brought to life when a statue of him is animated through the power of the Rat Talisman. He initially mistakes Jade for the goddess Cihuacoatl and El Toro Fuerte for the god Xolotl.
- Shen Chan is Jade's father from Hong Kong who is identified as Jackie's cousin. He and Jade's mother send their daughter to live in America under Jackie's supervision. During his appearance in "Demon World (Part 1)", Shen suggests that Uncle is "actually our cousin... aren't you?", although neither Jackie nor Uncle confirms the relationship.
- Jade's mother is the unnamed mother of Jade from Hong Kong who is implied to have married into the Chan family. She and Shen Chan send their daughter to live in America under Jackie's supervision.

== Antagonists ==
=== Main antagonists ===
- Shendu (voiced by James Sie) is the Demon Sorcerer of Fire and the main antagonist of the first two seasons, making recurring appearances thereafter. His Demon Portal is located at the entrance of Hong Kong Moose World and has the fire trigram: ☲. Centuries ago, Shendu was imprisoned in stone at the hands of Lo Pei and his twelve magical powers were sealed into the Talismans. He is briefly freed in the present day until being eventually turned back to stone and was destroyed. In his spirit form, Shendu accidentally possessed Valmont in an attempt to free the other Demon Sorcerers only to be banished back with a sword. Shendu was later resurrected by Daolon Wong only to be reduced to a statue again. In the series finale, Shendu is freed one last time to battle his son Drago, resulting in both being banished the Netherworld.
- The Dark Hand is a criminal syndicate led by Valmont that serves as a major antagonistic force against Jackie Chan and Section 13. It becomes defunct by the end of the second season.
- Shadowkhan are ninja-like shadow warriors who are initially summoned by Shendu. They are later revealed to be minions of the Oni, which each Oni General commanding its own distinct tribe of Shadowkhan (including Ninja, Razor, Bat, Sumo, Samurai, Squid, Crab, Mini, and Mantis). They are primarily summoned through their respective Oni Masks.
- Valmont (voiced by Julian Sands in seasons 1–2, Andrew Ableson in seasons 3–4, and Thomas Dekker as a child) is the ruthless crime lord in charge of the Dark Hand. He is a skilled fighter and acts as a secondary antagonist during the first two seasons but is reduced to a recurring character as he went broke for spending all his resources and wealth to fund expeditions to find the Talismans and Demon Portals. Valmont tried multiple times to regain his wealth before he gave up and became a bus driver in the series finale.
- Daolon Wong (voiced by James Hong) is a dark chi wizard and the main antagonist of season three. Described by Jade as the "Anti-Uncle", he is a powerful practitioner of dark magic and maintains a fierce rivalry with Uncle. He is initially introduced towards the end of season two as a minor recurring villain. He makes his last appearance in season four.
- Dark Chi Warriors are demonic servants created/transformed by Daolon Wong. When the original warriors are imprisoned, he converts the Dark Hand enforcers (Finn, Ratso, Chow, and later Hak Foo) into new ones.
- Tarakudo (voiced by Miguel Ferrer) is the Lord of all Oni and the main antagonist of season four. He seeks to collect the nine Oni Masks to free his generals and control the Shadowkhan. Like all Oni, he is susceptible to onions.
- Drago (voiced by Michael Rosenbaum) is Shendu's son from the future and the main antagonist of season five. Like his father, Drago is a demonic dragon endowed with fire demon chi. He harbors a grudge toward Jade because her adult self opposed him in his original timeline. He is introduced as a one-time villain in season four before becoming the main antagonist of season five. In the series finale, he and Shendu are both banished to the Netherworld.

=== Enforcers ===
The Enforcers are the henchmen of the Dark Hand. After season two, they are frequently employed by other villains, most notably Daolon Wong. A recurring theme is their repeated defeats by Jackie Chan. By season five, they become minor recurring characters with limited involvement in the main plot. At the end of the series, the four are completely reformed.

- Finn (voiced by Adam Baldwin) is the de-facto leader of the enforcers. He is an Irish-American with red hair and pasty-grey skin. As a Dark Chi Warrior, he replaces Ren. Before becoming a member of the Dark Hand, he sang in disco bands at weddings, as confirmed in the episode, "The Good Guys".
- Ratso (voiced by Clancy Brown) is another member of the group. He is denoted by his larger size and grayish-green skin tone. As a Dark Chi Warrior, he replaces Chui. Before joining the Dark Hand, Ratso studied theoretical physics, as confirmed in the episode, "The Good Guys".
- Chow (voiced by James Sie) is a Chinese-American member of group. He is denoted by his orange sunglasses and black leather jacket. As a Dark Chi Warrior, he replaces Gan. Before joining the Dark Hand, Chow worked at Sunglass Shack where he was Employee of the Month three times in a row, as confirmed in the episode, "The Good Guys".
- Hak Foo (voiced by Jim Cummings in season 1 and John DiMaggio from season 2 onward) is a muscular martial arts expert who announces his attacks using dramatic, metaphorical animal-themed names. He is first hired by Valmont and Shendu in season one and becomes a recurring antagonist after Tohru defects to the Chan side.

=== Ice Crew ===
The Ice Crew are a criminal group of teenage martial artists who serve Drago. They are initially introduced as one-time villains in season four before reappearing in season five where they replace the original enforcers. Drago transforms them into dragon hybrids with an aspect of his chi power.

- Strikemaster Ice (voiced by Mike Erwin) is the leader of the Ice Crew. He is nicknamed "crater face" by Jade due to his acne. Drago endows him with the power of dragon breath.
- MC Cobra (voiced by Jeff Fischer) is another member of the group. Drago endows him with the power of dragon speed.
- DJ Fist is the most heavily built member of the group and the only one never to speak. Drago endows him with the power of dragon strength.

=== Demon Sorcerers ===
The Demon Sorcerers are Shendu's siblings, ancient demons sealed in the Netherworld by the Eight Immortals centuries ago using the Pan'ku Box. Shendu attempts to free them in season two, but they are repeatedly banished back. Each of the Demon Sorcerers have a trigram and can only be banished back with the correct item that the Eight Immortals used. In season five, Drago tries to collect relics containing their chi.

- Po Kong (voiced by Mona Marshall) — The Mountain Demon with a ravenous appetite. Her portal is found within the courtyard of a castle on an island in Tokyo Bay, Japan and has the mountain trigram: ☶. She can only be banished back to the Demon Realm using a drum.
- Xiao Fung (voiced by Glenn Shadix) — The Wind Demon, a purple toad-like creature. His portal is located inside a washing machine at a prison in the Black Forest and has the wind trigram: ☴. He can only be banished back to the Demon Realm with a fan.
- Tchang Zu (voiced by Clancy Brown) — The Thunder Demon, an armored blue reptilian who controls lightning. His portal is a prop door found within the costume department of Mega-galactic Studios in Hollywood, California and has the thunder trigram: ☳. He can only be sent back to the Demon Realm with castanets.
- Tso Lan (voiced by Glenn Shadix) — The Moon Demon, a four-armed insectoid who can manipulate gravity. His portal is located high up in Earth's orbit and has the moon trigram: ☵. He can only be banished back to the Demon Realm with a lotus.
- Dai Gui (voiced by Frank Welker) — The Earth Demon, a large minotaur/lion-like creature with immense strength. His portal is located outside an abandoned villa in the countryside of Pamplona, Spain and has the earth trigram: ☷. He can only be banished back to the Demon Realm with a flower.
- Hsi Wu (voiced by André Sogliuzzo) — The Sky Demon, a gremlin-like bat-winged demon. His portal is in front of a restroom at Fenway Park in Boston, Massachusetts and has the sky trigram: ☰. He can only be banished back to the Demon realm with a flute.
- Bai Tza (voiced by Mona Marshall) — The Water Demon, a mermaid-like creature who once ruled Atlantis. Her portal is found within the hypogeum of the Colosseum in Rome, Italy and has the water trigram: ☱. She can only be banished back to the Demon realm with a gourd.

=== Oni Generals ===
The Oni Generals are Tarakudo's underlings, each in command of a specific tribe of Shadowkhan. They were imprisoned by good chi wizards in ancient Japan and sealed within the Oni Masks. When all nine masks are conjoined together in the season four finale, the Oni Generals break free but are soon defeated and sealed within Tarakudo's mask. (Note: With the notable exception of Ikazuki, the Oni Generals are not officially named in the series. The names used here are fan-adopted conventions commonly recognized within the Jackie Chan Adventures community for identification purposes.)

- Ikazuki (voiced by Maurice LaMarche) is the leader of the Oni Generals and Tarakudo's second-in-command who can summon Samurai Shadowkhan.
- Rairakku - An Oni General who can summon Ninja Shadowkhan.
- Murasaki - An Oni General who can summon Razor Shadowkhan.
- Kiiro - An Oni General who can summon Bat Shadowkhan.
- Midori - An Oni General who can summon Sumo Shadowkhan.
- Orenji - An Oni General who can summon Squid Shadowkhan.
- Kuro - An Oni General who can summon Crab Shadowkhan.
- Mosugurīn - An Oni General who can summon Mini Shadowkhan.
- Aka - An Oni General who can summon Mantis Shadowkhan.

=== Minor antagonists ===
- Karl Nivor (voiced by Ron Perlman) is a billionaire who feeds on endangered animals and employs a personal chef named Boris.
- Gnome Kop (voiced by Brian Doyle-Murray) is an action figure brought to life by the power of the Rat Talisman. He terrorizes the city while searching for his archenemy, Turbo Troll.
- Yokonowa Crime Family is a crime family that targets the Kyoto Octopus. It is led by an unnamed boss (voiced by Clyde Kusatsu).
- John Smith (voiced by Dan Gilvezan) is a wealthy man who accompanies Jackie and Jade to the Lost City of the Muntabs in search of the secrets of longevity. His butler is Larson (voiced by Oliver Muirhead).
- Origami (voiced by Tim Dang), real name Kuniko Kasahara, is an art collector and master thief who can transform into various origami forms.
- The Monk (voiced by Tim Lounibos) is a monk who accompanies Jackie and Jade to the Lotus Temple to steal the Scroll of Hung-Chao. He later teams up with Vanessa Barone, Peter Bailey, Angus McCutcheon, and Haggis to target the Silver Iguana of Awramba.
- Dr. Ashby Necrosis (voiced by Charles Shaughnessy) is a criminal genius known as the "Kingpin of Techno-Crime". His henchman is Hoyle (voiced by Greg Ellis), who can telekinetically manipulate cards.
- Spring-heeled Jack (voiced by Corey Burton) is a troll who once terrorized towns before being petrified by Simeon Magus. After Jackie accidentally frees him, he searches the city for Magus's descendants before being defeated and re-petrified.
- Vanessa Barone (voiced by Lauren Wood) is a treasure hunter, mercenary, and thief who targets the Eye of Aurora, which grants the power of teleportation. She later teams up with Peter Bailey, Angus McCutcheon, Haggis, and the Monk to target the Silver Iguana of Awramba.
- Peter Bailey (voiced by Roger Scott) is a black marketeer and thief who poses as an Inuit shaman. He later joins Vanessa Barone, Angus McCutcheon, Haggis, and the Monk in targeting the Silver Iguana of Awramba.
- Mr. Jumba (voiced by Dan Castellaneta) is a museum curator who targets the Sutras of Raktajiba along with his accomplices in an attempt to drain the Ganges River and reach the treasures beneath it. His accomplices are Dr. Weber (voiced by Patrick Pinney) and Portia Martindale (voiced by Kat Cressida).
- Cardiff Zendo (voiced by Maurice LaMarche) is a Moroccan art collector, café owner, and crime boss who seeks to obtain the Cat of Khartoum, which causes those scratched by it to exhibit cat-like traits.
- Giles (voiced by Michael T. Weiss) is the leader of a gang of hijackers targeting the Golden Dragon. His gang includes Butch and Basil (both voiced by Bill Fagerbakke) and an unnamed safecracker (voiced by Nicholas Guest).
- Angus McCutcheon and Haggis (both voiced by Victor Brandt) are two Scottish treasure hunters who seek the treasure of the pirate Greenbeard. They later team up with Vanessa Barone, Peter Bailey, and the Monk to target the Silver Iguana of Awramba.
- The Gloves of Greenbeard are sentient gloves that compel their wearers to steal valuable items.
- The Brotherhood of Magisters is an ancient order of magic-users led by the Head Magister (voiced by Neil Ross). They attempt to use Stonehenge to level London but are arrested by Interpol after their plan fails. The other members are voiced by Jeff Bennett, Rob Paulsen, and Frank Welker.
- Kiang-Shi (voiced by George Cheung) is a chi-draining vampire that feeds on the life energy of its victims. The vampire is blind and cannot see until it has drained enough chi. Uncle is briefly turned into its thrall until Jade and Tohru return him to normal.
- The Monkey King (voiced by Bill Tanzer in "I'll Be a Monkey's Puppet" and Billy West in "Monkey a Go-Go") is a magical Sun Wukong puppet. Pulling the puppet's leg grants the Monkey King a physical form at the cost of transforming the leg-puller into a puppet themselves. He is characterized as a chaotic bringer of mischief.
- Bartholomew Chang (voiced by Tim Dang) is a corrupt Taiwanese businessman obsessed with collecting rare jade artifacts. He is a recurring foe of the J-Team and later escapes prison with help from the Chang Gang.
- Yip (voiced by Tim Dang) is a dark chi wizard who collaborates with Bartholomew Chang to create evil clones of the J-Team, dubbed the J-Clones.
- The Chang Gang are Bartholomew Chang's team of criminal henchmen established to rival the J-Team. They include Tommy Chung (voiced by Tim Dang), Helga Sorensen (voiced by Cynthia Songé), Bob "The Bopper" Halfcock (voiced by Clancy Brown), and Phillip Crane (voiced by Bill Tanzer).
- Michael Diaz (voiced by Clancy Brown) is a con artist who posed as a museum curator to target the Golden Squid.
- Mirror Spirits are four evil spirits trapped in a mirror who cause people to transform into their greatest fear.
- Iso (voiced by Sam Riegel) is a dark chi wizard and the future self of Jade's friend Jimmy, who went rogue after becoming Tohru's apprentice.
