= Jackie Chan Adventures (video game) =

2004 video game

- European PlayStation 2 cover art
- Developer: Atomic Planet Entertainment
- Publisher: Sony Computer Entertainment
- Producer: Neil Holmes
- Designer: Jonathan Heckley
- Programmer: Duncan Chambers
- Artist: Dave Drury
- Writer: Stephen Griffiths
- Composer: Tim Haywood
- Platform: PlayStation 2
- Release: EU: October 1, 2004
- Genre: Action
- Mode: Single-player

Jackie Chan Adventures is a 2004 action video game based on the animated television series of the same name, which features a fictionalized version of Hong Kong action film star Jackie Chan. The game was developed by Atomic Planet Entertainment, published by Sony Pictures Television's sister company, Sony Computer Entertainment, and released for the PlayStation 2 on October 1, 2004, in Europe.

The game is compatible with the EyeToy. An Xbox version was also announced but ultimately never released. Jackie, Jade, Uncle, Valmont, and Shendu were voiced by their original actors.

== Story ==
The plot is a retelling of the show's first two seasons, combining both story arcs into a single saga. Section 13 enlists Jackie Chan to retrieve twelve magical Talismans scattered across the globe before they can be claimed by the Dark Hand. Simultaneously, he must prevent their leader, Valmont, from using the Pan'ku Box to release eight Demon Sorcerers from the Netherworld.

== Characters ==
Jackie Chan: The game's main protagonist. An expert in martial arts and an archeologist, Jackie secretly works for Section 13. He must collect the Talismans and defeat the Demon Sorcerers. He has a niece named Jade and an uncle named Uncle.

Jade Chan: Jackie's 12-year-old niece from China. She moved to the United States and has enjoyed her adventures with her uncle, who believes the missions he goes on are too dangerous for Jade.

Uncle: Jackie's uncle and the owner of an antique shop. A Chi Wizard who studied under Chi Master Fong for 15 years, he has extensive knowledge of antiques and magic. He researches the magical forces Jackie encounters and has a habit of hitting Jackie over the head.

Tohru: A massive Japanese man and former enforcer for the Dark Hand. Valmont gave him the Dragon Talisman to increase his strength. He later joins the J-Team.

Captain Black: An old friend of Jackie's and the leader of Section 13. He sends Jackie off on his missions, but he dislikes magic and demons.

El Toro Fuerte: A famous masked wrestler from Mexico. He uses the Ox Talisman to enhance his strength but gives it to Jackie after being defeated in battle. El Toro's biggest fan is Paco.

Paco: El Toro's biggest fan. He believes Jackie is a "mouseman" and El Toro is the greatest. He and Jade seem to argue about this every time they meet.

Viper: A former thief highly skilled in martial arts. She once used the Snake Talisman to steal jewels, but after Jackie retrieves it from her, she becomes a member of the J-Team.

The Fishing Guy: A Chinese man who appears in almost every level. He enjoys fishing and will save the game for Jackie in his diary. He runs several fishing stores—located in the Japanese Gardens, Fisherman's Wharf, the Spanish Village, and Golden Gate Park—where players can access a fishing minigame.

The Dark Hand: A criminal organization led by Valmont, an intelligent British man possessed by Shendu who dislikes sharing his body. Hak Foo is a muscular henchman who names all of his attacks and serves as Tohru's replacement. Finn is a joker who dresses in 1970s clothing. Ratso is strong but dim-witted, and his favorite band is Kiss. Chow is the shortest member but the most skilled in martial arts; he wears black clothing, sports prescription sunglasses, and drinks coffee.

The Demon Sorcerers: Eight demons, led by Shendu, who once ruled the world. They each possess unique powers derived from fire, sky, moon, earth, thunder, mountain, wind, and water. Defeated and banished to the Netherworld by the Eight Immortals of China using the Pan'ku Box, Shendu wishes to use the puzzle box to release his siblings so they can rule the world again.

Shadowkhan: Shadow warriors that serve as Shendu's minions. Normal Shadowkhan are weak and easily defeated. Armored Shadowkhan dress in red and attack with lethal blades, while Shadowkhan Mages wear Chinese hats and shoot fireballs. The Samurai Shadowkhan are the most powerful; they are spirits in samurai armor that attack with sharp swords but occasionally lose their helmets.

== Development and release ==
In July 2001, Sony Pictures Consumer Products and Encore Software signed a publishing deal to release video games based on Jackie Chan Adventures for the PlayStation 2, targeting a 2002 release. Shortly afterward, an Xbox version was also planned. The game never materialized until it was silently released by Sony Computer Entertainment in October 2004, exclusively in Europe. The Xbox version was never released.

In May 2005, Hip Games (a subsidiary of Hip Interactive) announced it would be publishing the game for North America, and was featured at E3 2005 as a part of their lineup. However, in July of that same year, Hip Interactive went bankrupt, and the title was never picked up for a North American release.

== Reception ==
Reception

Review score
| Publication | Score |
|---|---|
| PlayStation Official Magazine – UK | 3/10 |
