= Jackie Chan Adventures =

American-Hong Kong animated television series

- Genre: Action-adventure; Action comedy; Martial arts; Urban fantasy
- Developed by: John Rogers; Duane Capizzi; Jeff Kline
- Starring: Jackie Chan
- Voices of: James Sie; Stacie Chan; Sab Shimono; Noah Nelson; Clancy Brown; Adam Baldwin; Miguel Sandoval; Franco Velez; Susan Eisenberg; John DiMaggio
- Theme music composer: Jim Latham
- Ending theme: "Chan's the Man" by Wheatus (season 1)
- Composers: Jim Latham (season 1); Christopher Ward (seasons 2–5)
- Countries of origin: United States; Hong Kong
- Original language: English
- No. of seasons: 5
- No. of episodes: 95 (list of episodes)

Production
- Executive producers: Jackie Chan; Willie Chan; Brian Gersh; Solon So; Jeff Kline; Richard Raynis (season 1); Duane Capizzi (seasons 1–4)
- Producers: Michael Goguen (seasons 1–2); Frank Squillace (seasons 3–4); David Hartman (season 5)
- Editors: C.K. Horness (season 1); Jhoanne Reyes (seasons 2–5); Bruce King (season 4)
- Running time: 21 minutes
- Production companies: The JC Group; Blue Train Entertainment; Adelaide Productions; Sony Pictures Television (Note: Credited as Columbia TriStar Television (seasons 1–2) and Columbia TriStar Domestic Television (seasons 2–3).)

Original release
- Network: The WB (Kids' WB)
- Release: September 9, 2000 – July 8, 2005

Jackie Chan Adventures is an animated television series developed by John Rogers, Duane Capizzi and Jeff Kline, and produced by Sony Pictures Television (formerly Columbia TriStar Television and Columbia TriStar Domestic Television), Adelaide Productions, The JC Group and Blue Train Entertainment. The cartoon series premiered on September 9, 2000, and ran for five seasons until its conclusion on July 8, 2005. The series focuses on a fictionalized version of Hong Kong action film star Jackie Chan, who operates in life as an archaeologist and special agent, combatting threats that are mainly magical and supernatural (based on real-life mythologies and supernatural stories from Asia and around the world) with the aid of his family and allies.

Many of the episodes created for Jackie Chan Adventures featured references to Chan's actual works, with the actor making live-action appearances in the form of an interview situation, answering questions about his life and work. The series was aired in the United States on Kids' WB, with re-runs and second run premieres airing on Toon Disney's Jetix programming block, Cartoon Network's Toonami block, and in Canadian broadcasts on YTV's Vortex. The series proved a success on children's television, including abroad, leading to the creation of a toy franchise and two video games based on the series.

== Premise ==
Jackie Chan Adventures is set in a world which magic and supernatural forces exist but are unknown to much of humanity – these include demons, ghosts, spirits, spells, and various creatures and gods. Although the series focuses mostly on those from Asia, primarily Chinese mythology and folklore, it also includes those from other locations in the world, including Europe and Central America. In the animated series, the actor Jackie Chan exists in this setting as a professional archaeologist with a high degree of martial combat skill, who is forced to accept the fact that magic and the supernatural exist when he uncovers a talisman in an artifact that possesses magical powers sought out by a criminal organization.

Throughout the series, Chan is aided by his family, including his uncle and his niece Jade, and his ally Captain Black – head of a secret law enforcement organization codenamed "Section 13" – alongside additional companions introduced over the course of the series. Each season of the program primarily contains an overarching storyline in which Chan and his allies must face off against a dangerous demonic figure, aided by human henchman, by preventing them from finding a series of magical objects that can help them to conquer the world. Alongside the overarching plotline, seasons also include standalone stories that focus on Chan and his friends combating magical and supernatural forces that are either evil or not understanding of their situation. While storylines feature action sequences focused on magic and martial arts, they also include comedic situations akin to several of Chan's works in action-comedy films.

While Chan does not provide the voice of his animated character, he appears regularly in live-action inserts at the end of the program to offer insights on Chinese history, culture and philosophy as well as answering fan questions read by Stacie Chan offscreen.

=== References to Jackie Chan's career ===
The series often features references to Jackie Chan's films and his own life throughout the series. In the episode "A Night at the Opera", Uncle states that he was part of the stage group "Seven Little Fortunes", which Jackie Chan was actually part of in real life. Another example is in the episode "The Invisible Mom" where Jackie is bitten by a Snake, and uses a kung fu style known as "the drunken master" from one of his earliest headlining films of the same name. According to Jackie during one of his question segments, the characters of the show are based on certain people in his life. Uncle is based on his agent and father, Jade is based on an assortment of his nieces, and Tohru is based on one of his stunt team members as well as himself. The episode "And He Does His Own Stunts" is a reference to the fact that Jackie Chan does his own stunts in his movies.

Some episodes' titles are based on actual film names. For example, "Half a Mask of Kung Fu" is based on Half a Loaf of Kung Fu, four episode titles ("Enter the Viper", "Enter the Cat", "Re-Enter the J-Team", and "Re-Enter the Dragon") are based on Enter the Dragon (in which Jackie Chan performs as a stuntman), "Shanghai Moon" is based on Shanghai Noon, "Armor of the Gods" is based on Armour of God, "Project A, for Astral" is based on Project A and "Rumble in the Big House" is based on Rumble in the Bronx.

== Episodes ==
Season	Episodes	Originally released	
Season	Episodes	First released	Last released
1	13	September 9, 2000	March 17, 2001
2	39	September 8, 2001	September 7, 2002
3	17	September 14, 2002	May 3, 2003
4	13	September 13, 2003	February 14, 2004
5	13	September 11, 2004	July 8, 2005

== Cast ==
- James Sie as Jackie Chan, Chow, Shendu
- Stacie Chan as Jade Chan
- Sab Shimono as Uncle
- Noah Nelson as Tohru
- Clancy Brown as Captain Augustus Black, Ratso, Melvin/Super Moose
- Miguel Sandoval as El Toro Fuerte
- Franco Velez as Paco
- Susan Eisenberg as Viper
- Julian Sands as Valmont (seasons 1–2)
- Andrew Ableson as Valmont (seasons 3–4)
- Adam Baldwin as Finn
- Jim Cummings as Hak Foo (season 1)
- John DiMaggio as Hak Foo (seasons 2–5)
- James Hong as Daolon Wong
- Miguel Ferrer as Tarakudo
- Michael Rosenbaum as Drago
- Mike Erwin as Strikemaster Ice
- Jeff Fischer as MC Cobra
- Jackie Chan as himself

== Development ==
Jackie Chan Adventures originated from a proposal by Sony Pictures Television executive Andy Kaplan, who suggested creating an animated series starring Jackie Chan following his growing popularity in the United States after Rush Hour (1998). Screenwriter John Rogers developed the initial concept, drawing inspiration from Chan's 1986 adventure film Armour of God. His original proposal included the Chan family, Captain Black, Section 13, the Black Hand and Tohru.

Writers Jeff Kline and Duane Capizzi subsequently joined the production. Capizzi introduced supernatural elements inspired by the Hong Kong film A Chinese Ghost Story (1987), combining fantasy and martial arts with Chan's action-comedy style. The series was eventually acquired by Kids' WB, which was expanding its programming around the success of Pokémon.

The live-action segments featuring Chan were developed to help young viewers connect with the actor. Kline, who filmed the sequences, drew inspiration from the question-and-answer segments featured in the television series The Monkees.

== Broadcast ==
The series aired in the Republic of Ireland on RTÉ Two from April 30, 2001, and was regularly rerun until 2014.

In the Philippines, the series was first aired on ABS-CBN in 2003, then on GMA Network in 2005.

In India, this series was dubbed in its regional languages like Tamil, Telugu, Malayalam and Kannada and is aired by Sun Network on Chutti TV, Kushi TV, Kochu TV and Chintu TV. The show is still rerun on air as of May 2026.

== Reception ==
The series achieved strong television ratings shortly after its debut. In October 2000, Animation World Network reported that Jackie Chan Adventures was the second-highest-rated programme on Kids' WB, behind Pokémon, and led its timeslot among children aged 2–11 against competing broadcast networks. Following its early success, Kids' WB commissioned an additional 13 episodes for broadcast during the 2001–2002 television season.

Common Sense Media gave the show 4 out of 5 stars, saying "Lighthearted, entertaining, suspenseful, and humorous, this show may not be deep, but it's a lot of fun".

== Other media ==
=== Books ===
A number of books were released to accompany the series.

Issue no	Release name	Release date	Author	Publisher	Notes	Ref
#1	The Dark Hand	2002 (UK)	Eliza Willard	Grosset & Dunlap		
#2	Jade's Secret Power	2002 (UK)	Cathy West	Grosset & Dunlap		
#3	Sign of the Ox	2002 (UK)	Megan Stine	Grosset & Dunlap		
#4	Enter...the Viper	2002 (UK)	Jacqueline Carrol	Grosset & Dunlap		
#5	Shendu Escapes!	2002 (UK)	David Slack & Jim Thomas	Grosset & Dunlap		
#6	New Enemy	2002 (UK)	R. S. Ashby	Grosset & Dunlap		
#7	Revenge of the Dark Hand	2002 (UK)	Eliza Willard	Grosset & Dunlap		
#8	The Power of the Rat	2002 (UK)	Megan Stine	Grosset & Dunlap		
#9	Stronger Than Stone	2002 (UK)	R. S. Ashby	Grosset & Dunlap		
#10	Uncle's Big Surprise	2002 (UK)	Jacqueline Carrol	Grosset & Dunlap		
#11	The Jade Monkey	2002 (UK)	Judy Katschke	Grosset & Dunlap		
#12	The Strongest Evil	2002 (UK)	Jacqueline Carrol	Grosset & Dunlap		
N/A	The Day of the Dragon	2003 (UK)	Eliza Willard & David Slack & Alexx Dyne	Grosset & Dunlap	Special	

=== Comics ===
A number of comics were released to accompany the series.

Volume	Release name	Release date	Author	Publisher	Notes	Ref
#1	Enter the Dark Hand	July 15, 2004 (UK)	Duane Capizzi & John Rogers	Tokyopop		
#2	Legend of the Zodiac	October 15, 2004 (UK)	Duane Capizzi & David Slack	Tokyopop		
#3	Jackie and Jade Save the Day	January 15, 2005 (UK)	John Rogers	Tokyopop		
#4	Return of the Vampire	April 15, 2005 (UK)	John Tomlinson	Tokyopop		

=== Home media ===
In 2001, Sony Pictures Home Entertainment released episodes from the first season on VHS and DVD. But one format differed from the other in that of the four DVDs released, three were select, individual episodes while the fourth contained the whole season of 13 episodes; the VHS series had only three, separate episodes. Also, there was a difference in the titles of said episodes released on VHS and DVD. The Day of The Dragon VHS box cover art was the same as that of the first season DVD case cover, which featured Jackie, Jade and Uncle with the villains behind them, dimmed in a yellowish background. On these, the episodes were presented without the teasers that originally appeared prior to the opening/intro sequence as they aired. They are currently unavailable and out-of-print, especially since they had limited pressings and no plans have been announced to follow up season one with DVD box sets of the remaining four seasons. However, the entire series can be ordered and seen via video-on-demand service at Amazon and iTunes. As of October 2010, the entire series was made available on the Netflix streaming service.

On March 25, 2025, all five seasons of the series are made available for free streaming on Tubi, but since was removed on March 24, 2026, along with Men in Black: The Series.

The series was formerly streamed in Canada via CTV Television Network's streaming service, CTV Throwback.

Sony Pictures Home Entertainment plans to release the second season on DVD through Amazon.com, and other online retailers. Mill Creek Entertainment announced all five seasons on DVD in Region 1.

==== VHS ====
Release name	Release date	Publisher	Format	Notes	Ref
The Day of the Dragon	October 23, 2001	Sony Pictures	NTSC	30 minutes	
The Power Within	October 23, 2001	Sony Pictures	NTSC	30 minutes	
Friends & Foes	March 5, 2002	Sony Pictures	NTSC	30 minutes	
The Search for the Talisman	July 22, 2002	Sony Pictures	PAL	30 minutes	

==== DVD ====
DVD Title	# of Disc(s)	Year	Series	Episodes	DVD release		
DVD Title	# of Disc(s)	Year	Series	Episodes	Region 1	Region 2	Region 4
The Search for the Talisman (Volume 1)	1	2000	1	1–3	October 23, 2001	July 22, 2002	March 17, 2004
The Dark Hand Returns (Volume 2)	1	2000	1	4–6	March 5, 2002	September 1, 2002	March 17, 2004
The Shadow of Shendu (Volume 3)	1	2000	1	7–9	March 5, 2002	—N/a	—N/a
The Entire Season One	2	2000 & 2001	1	1–13	—N/a	May 17, 2004	—N/a
The Entire Season Two	4	2001 & 2002	1	14–52	June 5, 2012 (Note: Manufacture on Demand (MOD) release)	Pulled from schedule	
The Demon Portals Saga (Season 2)	3	2001 & 2002	1	14–52	June 4, 2019	—N/a	—N/a

=== Video games ===
There are two video games based on the animated series. The first, Jackie Chan Adventures: Legend of the Dark Hand is a beat 'em-up released for the Game Boy Advance in November 2001. The second, simply titled Jackie Chan Adventures is an action-adventure game released for the PlayStation 2 in October 2004.

Title	Genre	Platform	Studio	Release date	Notes
Jackie Chan Adventures: Legend of the Dark Hand	Beat 'em-up	Game Boy Advance	Activision	November 6, 2001 (US) & November 30, 2001 (EU)	Find eight stolen scrolls and stop the Dark Hand from unleashing demons.
Jackie Chan Adventures	Action	PlayStation 2	Sony Computer Entertainment	October 1, 2004 (EU), September 19, 2004 (CH) & Cancelled (US)	Play as Jackie Chan and collect the Talismans. Compatible with PlayStation's EyeToy.

== Successors ==
Following Jackie Chan Adventures, Chan set off to create local productions in Asia. The first, Jackie Chan's Fantasia, is a 52-episode Chinese animated series produced by Nanjing Hongying Animation Entertainment. It aired in 2009 on CCTV and in English on Sonic-Nickelodeon.

In 2017, Chan announced All New Jackie Chan Adventures, a $6 million 104-episode Chinese CG-animated series produced by Zhejiang Talent Television & Film, Khorgas JJ Culture Media Co., and VJ Animation Studio. It was released in China in 2017, with a feature film scheduled for 2019. Despite the name, it is unrelated to the American series.

== See also ==
- Mike Tyson Mysteries
