= Heavenly Sword and Dragon Slaying Sabre =

2019 Chinese television series

- Poster
- 倚天屠龙记
- Genre: Wuxia
- Based on: The Heaven Sword and Dragon Saber by Jin Yong
- Screenplay by: Guan Zhanbo
- Directed by: Jiang Jiajun
- Starring: Zeng Shunxi; Chen Yuqi; Zhu Xudan
- Opening theme: "A Life of Fighting is But a Dream" (刀剑如梦) by Wakin Chau
- Ending theme: "What is Eternity" (何为永恒) by Hu Xia
- Country of origin: China
- Original language: Mandarin
- No. of episodes: 50

Production
- Executive producer: Luo Rujia
- Production locations: Hengdian World Studios; Yinchuan; Xinjiang
- Running time: ≈45 minutes per episode
- Production company: Beijing Cathay Media

Original release
- Network: Tencent
- Release: February 27, 2019

Heavenly Sword and Dragon Slaying Sabre (倚天屠龙记) is a 2019 Chinese wuxia television series adapted from the novel The Heaven Sword and Dragon Saber by Jin Yong. Originally published in newspapers from 1961 to 1963, the story has been revised twice; once in 1979 and the second in 2005. This remake is primarily based on the third edition of the novel and also being promoted as a rework to the 1994 adaptation. The series is the first adaptation to be released as a web series and was first broadcast on Tencent in China on February 27, 2019.

== Synopsis ==
In the late Yuan dynasty of China, martial art sects and warriors fight for the lost Dragon Sabre which, according to legend, grants its possessor rulership of the jianghu. Yu Daiyan retrieves the sword but Yin Yewang's sister, Yin Susu, poisons him. Yin Susu arranges to transport Yu Daiyan home to be treated but an unknown mercenary cripples him.

Zhang Cuishan watches the Heavenly Eagle Sect demonstrate the dragon sabre but Xie Xun snatches it away and takes him and Yin Susu to a remote island but their ship sinks. Zhang Cuishan and Yin Susu arrive at an island that they like to call Fire Ice Island and fall in love, and married each other there. Xie Xun arrives there the next day and the three of them decide to become a family disregarding their differences due to the birth of Zhang Cuishan and Yin Susu's child, Zhang Wuji. The child is named Wuji in memory of Xie Xun's son Xie Wuji and names the Golden-Hair Lion King as their son's godfather.

Ten years later, Zhang Cuishan, Yin Susu and Zhang Wuji leave the island without Xie Xun, who chooses to stay on the island. They return to the mainland and travel to the Wudang Sect. During the journey, Zhang Wuji is kidnapped by one of the Xuanming Elders. At Wudang, Yu Daiyan recognizes Yin Susu's voice. Zhang Cuishan takes responsibility for the many murders Yin Susu committed in the past and suicides in front of multiple sects to protect his new family. Zhang Sanfeng and Yin Susu rescue Zhang Wuji then Yin Susu kills herself to join Zhang Cuishan, leaving Zhang Wuji orphaned. Zhang Wuji is poisoned by the toxic chill of the Xuanming Divine Palm and collapses.

Miejue and the Emei Sect attack Yang Xiao, who kidnaps Ji Xiaofu. Yang Xiao asks Ji Xiaofu to take care of an orphan girl named Yan'er who has endured abuse for one month. After one month, Ji Xiaofu wants to return to Emei; Yang Xiao tells her Miejue will consider that she and he have something between them and must be killed. Ji Xiaofu tells Yang Xiao the Heavenly Reliant Sword means a lot to her master Miejue and she tricks Yang Xiao into promising never to see her again. Yang Xiao steals the Heavenly Reliant Sword from its Mongol owner and returns it to Emei. Ji Xiaofu leaves Emei and gives birth to a girl named Yang Buhui in honour of her love for Yang Xiao.

Zhang Wuji leaves a note to Zhang Sanfeng stating the god of mercy admires him and will cure him, and then he runs away. Zhang Wuji prepares to die but a girl named Zhou Zhiruo saves his life. Zhou Zhiruo's father looks for Chang Yuchun. The next day, Zhou Zhiruo's father is ambushed, captured, and taken to a market where Zhang Wuji and Zhou Zhiruo were selling oranges. The soldiers force Zhou Zhiruo's father to tell them the whereabouts of Chang Yuchun but he tells them he does not know. Zhang Sanfeng arrives but Zhou Zhiruo's father dies. Zhang Sanfeng returns to Wudang with Zhou Zhiruo to take care of her for Zhang Wuji while Chang Yuchun takes Zhang Wuji to see Hu Qingniu at the Butterfly valley, who does not want to treat Zhang Wuji's cold poison. He feels Zhang Wuji's pulse and changes his mind. Zhang Wuji studies Hu Qingniu's books and acquires some medical skills.

Zhang Sanfeng brings Zhou Zhiruo back to Wudang but recommends she would join the Emei sect as Miejue took her in as a student.

Miejue finds Ji Xiaofu in the Butterfly Valley and defeats Golden Flower Granny who is trying to take Zhang Wuji and Ji Xiaofu to Divine Snake island. Later, Miejue kills Ji Xiaofu in grief with her palm strike for choosing Yang Xiao over Emei and this is witnessed by Zhang Wuji and Yang Buhui. Before Ji Xiaofu died, she asked Zhang Wuji to send Yang Buhui to her father Yang Xiao, and then returns to Wudang. On the way home, Zhang Wuji rescues a monkey from some dogs and is injured. The Zhu family tricks him to reveal Xie Xun's location. Zhang Wuji jumps off a cliff and Zhu Changling saves him but they are trapped on a small ledge. Zhang Wuji crawls through a narrow tunnel and finds the Nine Yang Divine manual from a white ape and masters it. The Nine Yang Divine Skill allows Zhang Wuji to cure his cold poison.

Zhu Changling kicks Zhang Wuji off the ledge. Zhang Wuji lands in a house and breaks both legs. Zhu'er helps him and attacks Zhu Jiuzhen with her spider poison as a result of killing the victim. Emei members are guests at Zhu Jiuzhen's home. They capture Zhu'er and Zhang Wuji.

Zhu'er and Zhang Wuji escape but Emei members take them prisoners on their way to Bright Light Peak to exterminate Ming Cult. Zhang Wuji has an opportunity to privately speak to Zhou Zhiruo when looking for a herb.

Zhang Wuji receives three powerful punches from Miejue to save the lives and limbs of Ming Cult's Five-Colored Flags residents. Shuobude captures Zhang Wuji and takes him to the throne room. Zhang Wuji unintentionally masters the Ming Cult's most powerful martial art of Heaven and Earth Great Shift and saves the cult from extermination by the great six sects, nearly losing his life in the Bright Light Peak battle but not until revealing his true identity to his family who is the opposing sects by his deceased parents. The great six sects keep their word not to bother Ming Cult to Zhang Wuji and reluctantly becomes the cult's leader.

Zhang Wuji and Ming Cult set out to bring Xie Xun from the remote island. On the way, they come across Yin Liting, whose joints are broken by Shaolin members, who turn out to be Zhao Min's subordinates. The Ming Cult people go to Shaolin but nobody is there. Zhang Wuji rushes to Wudang to save Wudang from extermination and then uses Taiji Fist and Taiji Swordplay on the Mongol princess Zhao Min's people.

Prior to the attack on Wudang, Zhao Min had already successfully captured and kept the great six sects in Wan'an Temple. A Ming Cult member and a spy within Zhao Min's people, Fan Yao, saves the sects. However, Miejue, still believing that the Ming Cult is evil and that Zhang Wuji has malicious intentions when saving the sects, refuses to accept Zhang Wuji's help and plunges to her death.

When Emei members discuss whether Zhou Zhiruo or Ding Minjun should be the next sect leader, Golden Flower Granny captures Zhou Zhiruo and takes her to Divine Snake Island. Zhao Min ensures she and Zhang Wuji are on the same ship as Golden Flower Granny. On Divine Snake Island, Zhang Wuji delays his reunion with Xie Xun. Persian Ming Cult attacks them. Xiaozhao and her mother leave for Persia with the Persian Ming Cult people.

One morning, Zhang Wuji wakes to find Zhu'er dead and that Zhao Min, the Heavenly Sword, and the Dragon Saber are missing. Zhang Wuji agrees to marry Zhou Zhiruo. Zhang Wuji, Xie Xun, and Zhou Zhiruo return to the mainland.

Mo Shenggu sees Song Qingshu's attempt to rape Zhou Zhiruo and tries to kill him. Due to intervention from Chen Youliang, it results in his own death.

At Chen Youliang's urging, Song Qingshu tries but fails to poison Zhang Sanfeng and is banished from Wudang.

Zhao Min lures Zhang Wuji away from his own wedding with Zhou Zhiruo.

Song Qingshu had been secretly following Zhou Zhiruo for some time and Zhou Zhiruo confronts him. She brings him back to Emei.

Zhang Wuji goes to Shaolin to rescue Xie Xun but Xie Xun refuses to leave.

All sects go to Shaolin for an event. Zhou Zhiruo almost kills Zhang Wuji and emerges as the champion.

Zhao Min's father surrounds Shaolin to exterminate the sects. Zhou Zhiruo gives the Book of Wumu to Zhang Wuji, who wins a few battles, but the tide turns after Zhao Min is killed by her father. Zhang Wuji mourns at Zhao Min's tombstone. Many people die, including Song Qingshu, Ding Minjun, Yin Tianzheng, Xie Xun, many different cult disciples, and many Mongol soldiers. Shaolin's siege ends when the Ming Cult army from Haozhou arrives.

It is revealed that Zhao Min is still alive. Her brother persuades her father to spare her and sends her back to Mongolia. But she returns for Zhang Wuji as she tells him she cannot live without him. Zhang Wuji and Zhao Min meet her father and brother for a peace treaty. The meeting goes well until Zhu Yuanzhang kills Zhao Min's father. Zhao Min leaves Zhang Wuji when he chooses his country over her but says he still cares for her and vows to go to Mongolia and find her.

The Ming Cult army has recovered most of China and Yuan emperor flees to the Eurasian Steppe, where the Yuan remnants establish the Northern Yuan dynasty. Zhang Wuji, wanting to end China's thousand years dynastic rule to give people the opportunity to govern the country, chooses to relinquish his chance to be sovereign and charges his followers to carry on protecting China against tyranny, injustice, and other threats. Off-screen, Zhu Yuanzhang, having earned a heroic reputation that rivals Zhang Wuji's from his battles against the Yuan forces, declaring that China needs a leader and wins support from his subordinates and allies, and becomes the Ming dynasty emperor, foiling Zhang Wuji's plan for China's self-governance.

In Mongolia, Zhang Wuji gets to be together with Zhao Min.

== Cast ==
- Zeng Shunxi as Zhang Wuji
  - Han Haolin as Zhang Wuji (child)
  - Lu Zhanxiang as Zhang Wuji (youth)
- Chen Yuqi as Zhao Min
- Zhu Xudan as Zhou Zhiruo
- Kabby Hui as Xiaozhao
- Cao Xiyue as Yin Li
- Kathy Chow as Miejue
- Zhang Yonggang as Xie Xun
- Zhang Chaoren as Song Qingshu
- Guo Jun as Song Yuanqiao
- Ethan Li as Zhang Cuishan
- Chen Xinyu as Yin Susu
- Lin Shen as Yang Xiao
- Wu Jingjing as Ji Xiaofu
- Sun Anke as Yang Buhui
- Wang Deshun as Zhang Sanfeng
- Zong Fengyan as Fan Yao
- Louis Fan as Cheng Kun
- Xiao Rongsheng as Yin Tianzheng
- Yu Bo as Yang Dingtian
- Tao Luoyi as Ding Minjun
- Zhao Yingzi as the Yellow Dress Maiden

== Production ==
The drama was filmed from January 20 to June 14, 2018. Filming took place at Yandang Mountains.

Kathy Chow, who played Zhou Zhiruo in the 1994 adaptation of The Heaven Sword and Dragon Saber, plays Zhou Zhiruo's teacher, Miejue. Guo Jun, who played Zhang Songxi in the 2009 adaptation, plays Song Yuanqiao in the series.

== International broadcast ==
Region	Network	Dates	Notes
Hong Kong, Macau, Singapore, Australia, United States, Malaysia Astro AOD and Worldwide	TVB Jade	15 April - 21 Jun (Monday to Friday at 8:30 PM)	Dubbed with Cantonese

Country	Network(s)/Station(s)	Series premiere	Title
(China); Hong Kong; Macau	TVB Jade; TVB Anywhere	April 15, 2019 – June 21, 2019 (Monday to Friday 20:30-21:30)	倚天屠龍記 ( ; lit: )
Singapore; Malaysia	TVB Jade	April 15, 2019 – June 21, 2019 (Monday to Friday 20:30-21:30)	倚天屠龍記 ( ; lit: )
Malaysia	Astro AOD	April 15, 2019 – June 21, 2019 (Monday to Friday 20:30-21:30)	倚天屠龍記 ( ; lit: )
Singapore	Hub Drama First	April 15, 2019 – June 21, 2019 (Monday to Friday 20:30-21:30)	倚天屠龍記 ( ; lit: )
Singapore	Hub VV Drama	August 9, 2019 – October 17, 2019 (Episode premiere Monday to Friday 21:00-22:00)	倚天屠龍記 ( ; lit: )
Australia	TVBJ (Australia)	April 16, 2019 – June 22, 2019 (Tuesday to Saturday 20:30-21:30)	Heavenly Sword and Dragon Slaying Sabre ( ; lit: )
Thailand	9 MCOT HD (30)	October 18, 2020 – April 18, 2020 (9 SERIES Saturday 14:05-15:55)	ดาบมังกรหยก (Darb mangkorn yok; lit: jade dragon sabre)
Thailand	9 MCOT HD (30)	April 1, 2021 - June 9, 2021 (Every Monday to Friday from 6:00 p.m. to 7:00 p.m.)	ดาบมังกรหยก (Darb mangkorn yok; lit: jade dragon sabre)
Taiwan	CTV	July 27, 2020 – October 1, 2020 (Monday to Friday 21:00-22:00, July 27, 20:00-22:00)	倚天屠龍記 ( ; lit: )
Taiwan	CTi Entertainment	December 9, 2020 – February 17, 2021 (Monday to Friday 21:00-22:00, December 9 20:00-22:00)	三千鸦杀 ( ; lit: )
Vietnam	VTV2	February 25, 2020 - May 20, 2020 (Everyday 19:50-20:30)	Tân Ỷ thiên đồ long ký (; lit: )
Vietnam	THVL2	July 1, 2026 - now (Everyday 18:00-18:50)	Tân Ỷ thiên đồ long ký (; lit: )

== Reception ==
The drama was criticized for its slow-motion action scenes. Among the cast, Lin Shen, and Zhu Xu Dan were notably praised for their acting.

== Awards and nominations ==
Award	Category	Nominee	Results	Ref.
26th Huading Awards	Best Supporting Actress	Kathy Chow	Nominated	
26th Huading Awards	Best Newcomer	Zeng Shunxi	Nominated	
China Entertainment Industry Summit (Golden Pufferfish Awards)	Best Marketing	Heavenly Sword and Dragon Slaying Sabre	Won	
Golden Bud - The Fourth Network Film And Television Festival	Best Web Series	Heavenly Sword and Dragon Slaying Sabre	Nominated	
Golden Bud - The Fourth Network Film And Television Festival	Best Actor	Zeng Shunxi	Nominated	
Golden Bud - The Fourth Network Film And Television Festival	Best Actress	Chen Yuqi	Nominated	
Golden Bud - The Fourth Network Film And Television Festival	Best Actress	Zhu Xudan	Nominated	

== Soundtracks ==
- "A Life of Fighting is But a Dream" (刀劍如夢) performed by Wakin Chau
- "Forgetting Each Other" (倆倆相忘) performed by Winnie Hsin
- "This Life, Only You" (此生惟你) performed by Zhou Shen
- "Pure Heart" (赤子心) performed by Li Qi
- "What is Eternity" (何为永恒) performed by Hu Xia
