= Kongtong Sect =

Fictional Chinese martial arts sect

- Chinese: 崆峒派
Transcriptions
Standard Mandarin
- Hanyu Pinyin: Kōngtóng Pài
Yue: Cantonese
- Jyutping: Hung^{1}-Tung^{4} Paai^{3}

The Kongtong Sect or Kongtong School (崆峒派) is a fictional martial arts sect mentioned in several works of wuxia fiction. It is commonly featured as a leading orthodox sect in the wulin (martial artists' community). It is named after the Kongtong Mountains, where it is based.

== History ==
According to legend, the Kongtong Sect was founded by Mulingzi (木靈子), who in his childhood had met an immortal in the Kongtong Mountains and learnt martial arts. Mulingzi became a formidable martial artist and founded the Kongtong Sect, which later became one of the leading "orthodox" martial arts sects in the wulin alongside Shaolin, Wudang, and others.

Mulingzi was known for his most powerful skill, the Seven Harms Fist (七傷拳), and his chivalrous character. He hated villainy so he often roamed the wulin in his younger days as a knight-errant to help the poor and punish the wicked. In his later years, he still retained his fiery temper and strong aversion towards evil. Whenever he saw any Kongtong member engaging in an immoral act, he would severely punish that person. He was especially strict towards his apprentices.

In The Heaven Sword and Dragon Saber, the Kongtong Sect is led by a group of five elders, who joins five other "orthodox" sects to attack the "unorthodox" Ming Cult. Xie Xun of the Ming Cult had stolen the Seven Harms Fist manual from Kongtong and mastered the skill. The protagonist Zhang Wuji, who has become the new leader of the Ming Cult, saves the cult from being destroyed by the six sects. He also heals one of Kongtong's elders, Zong Weixia, during a fight, and inadvertently improves the cult's relations with Kongtong. Zong and some Kongtong members later appear to help Zhang Wuji rescue Xie Xun from Shaolin Monastery even though Xie was previously an enemy of the Kongtong Sect.

== Skills and martial arts ==
Kongtong's martial arts bear some resemblance to those of Wudang and Kunlun because they all have their roots in Taoism. Kongtong's main focus in martial arts are to improve physical fitness and increase neigong strength. A unique feature of Kongtong is that its members do not use traditional weapons such as swords, sabers, and staffs. Instead, Kongtong has its own custom weapons that come in all forms and shapes, but are nevertheless just as deadly. The weapons' designs make them easily concealable and can be secretly used in combat to gain an edge over opponents. Some of Kongtong's best known skills include: Seven Harms Fist (七傷拳), Soaring Phoenix Hand (飛鳳手), and Yin and Yang Grind (陰陽磨).

== See also ==
- Kongtong Mountains
