= The Hidden Power of the Dragon Sabre =

1984 Hong Kong film by Chor Yuen

- DVD cover art
- 魔殿屠龍
- Directed by: Chor Yuen
- Written by: Shaw Creative Group
- Produced by: Mona Fong
- Starring: Derek Yee; Ti Lung; Alex Man; Cherie Chung; Leanne Liu
- Cinematography: Lam Chiu
- Edited by: Siu Fung; Ma Chung-yiu; Chiu Cheuk-man
- Music by: Stephen Shing; So Jan-hau
- Production company: Shaw Brothers Studio
- Distributed by: Shaw Brothers Studio
- Release date: 19 June 1984
- Running time: 87 minutes
- Country: Hong Kong
- Language: Mandarin
- Box office: HK$652,164

The Hidden Power of the Dragon Sabre (魔殿屠龍) is a 1984 Hong Kong wuxia film directed by Chor Yuen and produced by the Shaw Brothers Studio. It continues after the events of the novel The Heaven Sword and Dragon Saber by Jin Yong, and is loosely connected to the 1978 film Heaven Sword and Dragon Sabre, which is adapted from the novel.

== Synopsis ==
Zhang Wuji, the leader of the Ming Cult, holds custody over the Heaven-reliant Sword and Dragon-slaying Saber – the two weapons which have previously caused much turmoil in the wulin. The Jiuyin Zhenjing and Jiuyang Zhenjing are respectively kept by Zhou Zhiruo and Zhang Wuji.

Meanwhile, Zhu Yuanzhang has become the emperor and established the Ming dynasty. Unknown to everyone, Song Qingshu has changed his appearance and infiltrated the palace, becoming the emperor's adviser. He kills Zhou Zhiruo and steals the Jiuyin Zhenjing, later acquiring the Jiuyang Zhenjing and the two weapons as well. He becomes nearly invincible and attempts to stir up conflict between the Ming Cult and the Mongols.

Zhang Wuji teams up with Tiezhen, a Mongol general, to save a Mongol princess and they work together to master a new technique to counter Song Qingshu and eventually defeat him.

== Cast ==
- Derek Yee as Zhang Wuji
- Ti Lung as Tiezhen
- Alex Man as Song Qingshu
- Cherie Chung as the Mongol princess
- Leanne Liu as Zhou Zhiruo
- Ku Feng as Zhu Yuanzhang
- Lo Lieh as Xie Xun
- Lung Tien-hsiang as Wei Yixiao
- Dang Wai-ho as Yang Xiao
- Yuen Wah as Fan Yao
- Elvis Tsui as Weizhen
