= The Heaven Sword and Dragon Saber (disambiguation) =

The Heaven Sword and Dragon Saber is a novel by Jin Yong. It may also refer to:

Hong Kong:

- The Heaven Sword and Dragon Saber (1978 TV series)
- The Heaven Sword and Dragon Saber (2000 TV series)
- Heaven Sword and Dragon Sabre (film), a two-part 1978 Hong Kong film

Taiwan:

- The Heaven Sword and Dragon Saber (1984 TV series)
- The Heaven Sword and Dragon Saber (1994 TV series)
- The Heaven Sword and Dragon Saber (2003 TV series)

China:

- The Heaven Sword and Dragon Saber (2009 TV series)
- Heavenly Sword and Dragon Slaying Sabre, 2019 TV series

== See also ==
- New Heavenly Sword and Dragon Sabre, a 1986 Hong Kong television series
