= New Kung Fu Cult Master 1 =

2022 Hong Kong-Chinese film by Wong Jing and Venus Keung

- Film poster
- 倚天屠龍記之九陽神功
- Directed by: Wong Jing; Venus Keung
- Screenplay by: Wong Jing
- Based on: The Heaven Sword and Dragon Saber by Jin Yong
- Produced by: Wong Jing
- Starring: Raymond Lam; Janice Man; Sabrina Qiu; Yun Qianqian; Louis Koo; Rebecca Zhu; Donnie Yen
- Cinematography: Venus Keung
- Edited by: Yeung Kai-wing
- Music by: Lincoln Lo
- Production companies: Mega-Vision Pictures; TVB; World Universe Culture; Jing's Studio; Wishart Media; Shaw Brothers Pictures International
- Release dates: 28 January 2022 (Singapore); 31 January 2022 (China)
- Running time: 114 minutes
- Countries: Hong Kong; China
- Language: Cantonese
- Budget: HK$370 million

New Kung Fu Cult Master 1 (倚天屠龍記之九陽神功) is a 2022 wuxia film loosely adapted from the novel The Heaven Sword and Dragon Saber by Jin Yong. A Hong Kong-Chinese co-production, it was directed by Wong Jing and Venus Keung, serving as a reboot of the 1993 film Kung Fu Cult Master. The film starred Raymond Lam, Janice Man, Sabrina Qiu, Yun Qianqian, Louis Koo, Rebecca Zhu, and Donnie Yen. The film was theatrically released on 28 January 2022 in Singapore, while it was released on streaming platforms on 31 January 2022 in China. A sequel, New Kung Fu Cult Master 2, was released on streaming platforms on 3 February 2022 in China.

== Synopsis ==
Zhang Cuishan and Yin Susu take their teenage son Zhang Wuji with them back to mainland China after spending the past 15 years on a remote island. They commit suicide in defiance after refusing to reveal the whereabouts of Xie Xun, Zhang Wuji's godfather. Zhang Wuji himself is also critically wounded by the Xuanming Elders, but survives after learning the "Nine Yang Divine Skill" by chance. He returns to prevent a major conflict between the Ming Cult and the six major orthodox sects in the wulin. In the process, he gets romantically entangled with the Mongol princess Zhao Min, his childhood friend Zhou Zhiruo, and the Ming Cult's Xiaozhao. Through his adventures, he unwittingly becomes the Ming Cult's leader.

== Cast ==
- Raymond Lam as Zhang Wuji
  - Chaney Lin as Zhang Wuji (teenager)
- Janice Man as Zhao Min
- Sabrina Qiu as Zhou Zhiruo
- Yun Qianqian as Xiaozhao
- Louis Koo as Zhang Cuishan
- Rebecca Zhu as Yin Susu
- Donnie Yen as Zhang Sanfeng
- Elvis Tsui as Xie Xun
- Alex Fong as Yang Xiao
- Chen Zihan as Daiqisi
- Raymond Wong as Wei Yixiao
- Jade Leung as Miejue
- Louis Fan as Dog
- Hung Yan-yan as Cat
- Zhang Xuan as Ding Minjun
- Derek Kok as Fan Yao
- Tin Kai-man as Mount Hua Sect elder
- Lam Chi-chung as Mount Hua Sect elder
- Mars as Kongwen
- Lee Ka as Kongxing
- Wilfred Lau as Song Qingshu
- Felix Lok as Yin Tianzheng
- Parkman Wong as Song Yuanqiao
- Asano Nagahide as Yu Lianzhou
- Dominic Ho as Yin Liting
- Edward Chui as Zhang Songxi
- Ken Hung as Mo Shenggu
- Jason Wong as Yu Daiyan
- Xing Yu as Cheng Kun
- Ding Yusen as Lu Zhangke
- Yu Kang as He Biweng
- Wiyona Yeung as Zhou Zhiruo's mother

== Production ==
On 21 December 2019, Wong Jing posted a teaser poster of the film on his Sina Weibo account and stating that Zhang Wuji will finally meet Zhao Min in Dadu, hinting he will be making a follow-up to his 1993 film Kung Fu Cult Master, which ended in a cliffhanger. Principal photography began for the film began in January 2020 at the Hengdian World Studios. However, production was halted two weeks later due to the COVID-19 pandemic and was resumed in mid-April of the same year. On 7 May 2020, Wong released stills of the cast in their characters on his Sina Weibo account.

On 2 January 2022, Wong announced on his Sina Weibo account that the film had been split into two parts, New Kung Fu Cult Master 1 and New Kung Fu Cult Master 2, to be released during the Lunar New Year. This later led to speculations that the cast was having disagreements with the production over salary disputes, but cast member Donnie Yen later responded to this by stating that he knew that it was going to be a duology from the start.

== Release ==
New Kung Fu Cult Master 1 premiered with theatrical release in Singapore on 28 January 2022 while in China, the film was released on 31 January 2022 on streaming platforms with a fee of RMB¥5 to stream the film. A sequel, New Kung Fu Cult Master 2, was released on streaming platforms on 3 February 2022 in China.
