= New Kung Fu Cult Master 2 =

2022 Hong Kong-Chinese film by Wong Jing and Venus Keung

- Film poster
- 倚天屠龍記之聖火雄風
- Directed by: Wong Jing; Venus Keung
- Screenplay by: Wong Jing
- Based on: The Heaven Sword and Dragon Saber by Jin Yong
- Produced by: Wong Jing
- Starring: Raymond Lam; Janice Man; Sabrina Qiu; Yun Qianqian
- Cinematography: Venus Keung
- Edited by: Yeung Kai-wing
- Music by: Lincoln Lo
- Production companies: Mega-Vision Pictures; TVB; World Universe Culture; Jing's Studio; Wishart Media; Shaw Brothers Pictures International
- Release dates: 3 February 2022 (China); 12 February 2022 (Singapore)
- Running time: 113 minutes
- Countries: Hong Kong; China
- Language: Cantonese

New Kung Fu Cult Master 2 (倚天屠龍記之聖火雄風) is a 2022 wuxia film loosely adapted from the novel The Heaven Sword and Dragon Saber by Jin Yong and a sequel to New Kung Fu Cult Master 1, which was released earlier in the same year. A Hong Kong-Chinese co-production, the film was directed by Wong Jing and Venus Keung, starring Raymond Lam, Janice Man, Yun Qianqian, and Sabrina Qiu. The film was released on streaming platforms in China on 3 February 2022, while it was theatrically released in Singapore on 12 February 2022.

== Synopsis ==
Zhao Min lures Zhang Wuji to a pagoda where she is holding captive the members of the six major orthodox sects in the wulin, and offers to release them in exchange for him pledging allegiance to the Yuan imperial government, but he refuses. Miejue, the Emei Sect's leader, forces Zhou Zhiruo to swear never to fall in love with Zhang Wuji before passing the sect's leadership position to her and revealing to her the secret of the Heaven-Reliant Sword and Dragon-Slaying Saber. Zhang Wuji manages to save all the captives except Miejue, who refuses his help and plunges to her death.

Ding Minjun blames Zhou Zhiruo for Miejue's death and tries to fight her for the Emei Sect's leadership position. Zhao Min drugs Zhou Zhiruo and forces her to accompany her, Zhang Wuji and Xiaozhao to Ice-Fire Island. On the island, they are attacked by the Xuanming Elders but Zhang Wuji fends them off. Later, Xiaozhao leaves them to replace her mother Daiqisi as the leader of the Persian Ming Cult. Zhao Min drugs everyone, steals the Dragon-Slaying Saber and sails off with Zhou Zhiruo. Zhou Zhiruo escapes and tells Zhang Wuji what happened, agreeing to marry him. Song Qingshu kills Ding Minjun, but gets killed by Zhou Zhiruo.

At Zhang Wuji and Zhou Zhiruo's wedding, Zhao Min shows up to disrupt the ceremony. Zhou Zhiruo attacks Zhao Min but Zhang Wuji stops her. When Zhang Wuji decides to leave with Zhao Min to find his godfather Xie Xun, Zhou Zhiruo declares the end of her relationship with Zhang Wuji. Zhao Min then explains that Zhou Zhiruo had used Song Qingshu as a scapegoat to become the Emei Sect's leader, and that she was the one who drugged him, stole the two weapons, and captured Xie Xun.

Zhang Wuji confronts Zhou Zhiruo when she prepares to execute Xie Xun, and their fight is interrupted by Cheng Kun. Zhang Wuji and Zhou Zhiruo team up to defeat Cheng Kun, but Zhou Zhiruo is mortally wounded and dies after forcing Zhang Wuji to promise never to let down Zhao Min.

== Cast ==
- Raymond Lam as Zhang Wuji
- Janice Man as Zhao Min
- Sabrina Qiu as Zhou Zhiruo
- Yun Qianqian as Xiaozhao
- Elvis Tsui as Xie Xun
- Alex Fong as Yang Xiao
- Raymond Wong as Wei Yixiao
- Chen Zihan as Daiqisi
- Jade Leung as Miejue
- Derek Kok as Fan Yao
- Tin Kai-man as Mount Hua Sect elder
- Lam Chi-chung as Mount Hua Sect elder
- Zhang Xuan as Ding Minjun
- Sun Jiaolong as the Prince of Ruyang
- Ye Xiangming as Wang Baobao
- Xing Yu as Cheng Kun
- Mars as Kongwen
- Wilfred Lau as Song Qingshu
- Felix Lok as Yin Tianzheng
- Parkman Wong as Song Yuanqiao
- Asano Nagahide as Yu Lianzhou
- Dominic Ho as Yin Liting
- Edward Chui as Zhang Songxi
- Ken Hung as Mo Shenggu
- Jason Wong as Yu Daiyan
- Ding Yusen as Lu Zhangke
- Yu Kang as He Biweng
- Gui Jingjing as Lady Han
- Sun Yifei, Xu Xin and Yang Zhenyuan as the Wind, Cloud and Moon Messengers

== Production ==
On 2 January 2022, Wong Jing announced on his Sina Weibo account that the film had been split into two parts, New Kung Fu Cult Master 1 and New Kung Fu Cult Master 2, to be released during the Lunar New Year. This later led to speculations that the cast was having disagreements with the production over salary disputes, but cast member Donnie Yen later responded to this by stating that he knew that it was going to be a duology from the start.

== Release ==
The film was released on streaming platforms on 3 February 2022 in China, while it was theatrically released in Singapore on 12 February 2022.

== Reception ==
David Chew of asianmoviepulse.com wrote, "Although Raymond Lam and his female leads play their parts fittingly well, this sequel definitely suffers due to the lack of superstar power like Donnie Yen and Louis Koo from the first movie. Also, as far as wuxia yarn goes, there is hardly any decent or impact action on display here, probably due to the limited budget. But at least we do get a watchable sequel even though it seems like it was rushed through. Instead of cutting corners, Wong Jing and Venus Keung probably would be better off aiming for a trilogy since there is more than enough material in Jin Yong's original intriguing and engrossing novel."

Marcus Goh of Yahoo Lifestyle Singapore gave the film 3 out of 5 stars, writing, "New Kung Fu Cult Master 2 barely manages to hold its own without the two superstars from the first film. While the female leads play their part well, Raymond Lam just doesn't have what it takes to play Zhang Wuji. More action and exposition would have helped make a better film. But if you watched the first, then this second is almost mandatory viewing - if only to give some closure to the first."

Brandon Toh of geekculture.co wrote, "While New Kung Fu Cult Master 1 built up anticipation and set up the foundation for an enthralling story, New Kung Fu Cult Master 2 didn't manage to deliver, due to a rushed pace and slight mischaracterisation of a core character."

Screenhkblog.com gave the film 2½ out of 5 stars, writing, "Given the scope of Jin Yong's The Heaven Sword and Dragon Saber that covers multiple characters and events, it would have been wise for Wong Jing and Venus Keung to make this into a trilogy instead."

The Scribbling Geek wrote, "I'm glad the producers went a little bolder, a little wilder with this second part. I wouldn't have minded too, had they gone further with the changes."

Gabriel Chong of movieexclusive.com gave the film 2½ out of 5 stars, writing, "So while we were pleasantly surprised by its predecessor, we were left genuinely jaded by New Kung Fu Cult Master 2, particularly because we thought the point of Wong Jing revisiting this story was so he could get a chance to film the conclusion. Those who have read the book will know that there is more than enough material within for a trilogy, but to try to tell the story over the length of two feature films necessarily means Wong Jing should have had the good sense to trim down the story and make some narrative adjustments. As much as you feel compelled to see how it ends, we urge you to leave it hanging; at least then you'd have done so at a high, than endure a sure but gradual descent to new lows. If this is the sequel Wong Jing did not get to make back in the 1990s, we'd rather he did not make it after all."
