= Kunlun Sect =

Fictional martial arts sect

- Traditional Chinese: 崑崙派
- Simplified Chinese: 昆仑派
Transcriptions
Standard Mandarin
- Hanyu Pinyin: Kūnlún Pài
Yue: Cantonese
- Jyutping: Kwan^{1}-Leon^{4} Paai^{3}

The Kunlun Sect or Kunlun School (崑崙派) is a fictional martial arts sect or school mentioned in several works of wuxia fiction. It is commonly named as a leading "orthodox" martial arts sect in the wulin (martial artists' community). It is named after the Kunlun Mountains, where it is based. Due to its geographical location, it was hardly known to the wulin before its rise to prominence.

== History ==
The Kunlun Sect's history can be traced back to the Zhou dynasty (c. 1046–256 BC). According to legend, its founders were Laozi and Yuanshi Tianzun. The latter had 12 apprentices, who became the Twelve Elders of Kunlun. Although the Kunlun Sect has its roots in Taoism, its members do not strictly follow Taoist customs and practices.

Kunlun's rise to prominence in the wulin only came after martial artists such as He Zudao made their names through their combat skills and deeds of gallantry. Under the leadership of He Zudao's successors, Kunlun became one of the leading "orthodox" sects in the wulin and a dominant one in western China.

Kunlun has a strict code of conduct for its members, who are forbidden from associating with people from the "unorthodox" side of the wulin or they will be expelled from Kunlun. Unlike the Quanzhen and Wudang sects which take in only male members, Kunlun accepts members of both sexes and allows them to marry and start families. Kunlun members are also not bound by regulation to maintain vegetarian diets.

One notable trait of the Kunlun Sect is its aspiration to become the most powerful martial arts sect in the wulin, and some of its leaders have resorted to extreme measures to achieve this goal. In Jin Yong's The Heaven Sword and Dragon Saber, He Zudao and He Taichong are ruthless and ambitious individuals seeking to achieve supremacy in the wulin. He Taichong, in particular, is an unscrupulous villain who turns to various means to seize the Dragon Slaying Saber so that he can use it against his rivals.

== See also ==
- Kunlun Mountains
- Kunlunquan
