= List of The Heaven Sword and Dragon Saber characters =

List of characters from the novel The Heaven Sword and Dragon Saber by Jin Yong

The following is a list of characters from the wuxia novel The Heaven Sword and Dragon Saber by Jin Yong. Some of these characters are fictionalised personas of, or are based on, actual historical figures, such as Zhu Yuanzhang, Chang Yuchun, Xu Da, Zhang Sanfeng, and Chen Youliang.

== Main characters ==
- Zhang Wuji (張無忌)
- Zhao Min (趙敏)
- Zhou Zhiruo (周芷若)

== Ming Cult ==
The Bright Left and Right Emissaries (左右光明使)

- Yang Xiao (楊逍) is the Bright Left Emissary and Yang Buhui's father. Following Yang Dingtian's disappearance, he served as the cult's acting leader and attempted to master the "Heaven and Earth Great Shift" to secure his legitimacy as some cult members disapproved of his leadership. After Zhang Wuji becomes the cult leader, Yang Xiao serves as his adviser and close confidant.
- Fan Yao (范遙) is the Bright Right Emissary. After Yang Dingtian's disappearance, he disfigured himself and disguised himself as a mute ascetic monk called Kutoutuo (苦頭陀) so that he could infiltrate the Yuan forces and serve as a spy for the cult. His cover is blown when he helps the members of the six sects escape from Wan'an Monastery after they are drugged and held captive there by Zhao Min.

The Four Guardian Kings (四大護教法王)

- Daiqisi (黛綺絲), nicknamed "Purple Dress Dragon King" (紫衫龍王), is one of the three Sacred Maidens of the Persian Ming Cult. Born in Persia, she is of Persian-Chinese heritage, with a Chinese father who was a high priest in the Persian Ming Cult and a Persian mother. She was originally sent to China on a secret mandate to find the lost manual of the "Heaven and Earth Great Shift." Once called as "the most beautiful woman in the wulin", she had attracted the attention of countless men, including Fan Yao. However, she fell in love with Han Qianye after fighting him in the Icy Lake. As her fellow cult members disapproved of her romance with Han, the couple left the cult and lived in seclusion. She also disguised herself as an old woman called "Golden Flower Granny" (金花婆婆) to avoid persecution by the Persian Ming Cult for breaking her vow of celibacy. She has a daughter, Xiaozhao, whom she sent back to the Ming Cult to steal the "Heaven and Earth Great Shift" manual. She eventually returns to Persia with Xiaozhao after convincing her daughter to take her place as a Sacred Maiden.
- Yin Tianzheng (殷天正), nicknamed "White Brows Eagle King" (白眉鷹王), is Yin Yewang and Yin Susu's father, and Zhang Wuji's maternal grandfather. He left the Ming Cult after Yang Dingtian's disappearance, and founded the Heavenly Eagle Cult in Jiangnan. After Zhang Wuji becomes the Ming Cult's leader, the Heavenly Eagle Cult merged into the Ming Cult, and Yin continued serving as a guardian king. Yin eventually dies of exhaustion while fighting the three Shaolin elders to save Xie Xun.
- Xie Xun (謝遜), nicknamed "Golden Haired Lion King" (金毛獅王), is Zhang Wuji's godfather. His most powerful skill is the Lion's Roar (獅吼功), which allows him to project his neigong through sound waves and cause internal injuries to everyone in the vicinity. His family was murdered by his former master Cheng Kun, who disappeared after committing the atrocity. Guided by fury, he went on a rampage to kill many people and push the blame to Cheng Kun in the hope of forcing him out of hiding, but to no avail. After he kidnapped Zhang Cuishan and Yin Susu, Yin blinded him with her darts in self-defence when he was in a violent fit of insanity. His insanity was cured when he heard the cries of their newborn son, which reminded him of his own deceased son. He accepted their offer to be the godfather of their son, whom he named "Wuji" in memory of his son. The relatives of Xie's victims forgive him after his final confrontation with Cheng Kun. Xie ultimately becomes a Buddhist monk for the rest of his life to seek peace and redemption for his past sins.
- Wei Yixiao (韋一笑), nicknamed "Blue-Winged Bat King" (青翼蝠王), is unmatched in his qinggong prowess in the wulin. He once accidentally infected himself with an icy venom while practising the skill Icy Palm (寒冰綿掌). Since then, he has to routinely consume the warm blood of living creatures (including humans) to keep himself warm. Zhang Wuji cures him later by using the "Nine Yang Divine Skill" to purge the venom from his body.
- Yang Buhui (楊不悔) is Yang Xiao and Ji Xiaofu's daughter. Her name literally means "no regrets" to reflect her mother's love for Yang Xiao. Zhang Wuji helps her escape from Miejue after her mother's death and leads her on a perilous journey to bring her safely to her father. She regards Zhang Wuji as a brother for his care and concern towards her. The trauma of witnessing her mother's death makes her become paranoid of anyone who could be a potential enemy and this intensifies her hatred towards Miejue. This is evident in her treatment towards Xiaozhao when she and her father suspect Xiaozhao of being a spy from the Emei Sect. It also made her extremely protective towards her father and Zhang Wuji, whom she sees as what is left of her family and trust only them. She falls in love with Yin Liting, her mother's original fiancé, and marries him despite their age gap.
- Zhu Yuanzhang (朱元璋) is an ambitious minor leader of the cult who eventually unites the rebel factions under his control and leads them to overthrow the Yuan dynasty, becoming the founding emperor of the Ming dynasty.
- Chang Yuchun (常遇春) is a cult member who travels with Zhang Wuji to Butterfly Valley to seek treatment from Hu Qingniu.
- Xu Da (徐達) is a cult member who inherits the Book of Wumu. He uses its knowledge to lead the rebels to victory in battles against Yuan forces.
- Han Lin'er (韓林兒) is Han Shantong's son. At one point, he is kidnapped by the Beggar Clan, but is later saved by Zhang Wuji. After Han Shantong dies, Han Lin'er takes control of his father's forces. Han Lin'er is eventually falsely accused by Zhu Yuanzhang of betraying the rebels, and executed by drowning.
- Five Wanderers (五散人):
  - Leng Qian (冷謙), nicknamed "Cold Faced Gentleman" (冷面先生).
  - Shuobude (說不得), nicknamed "Monk with the Sack" (布袋和尚).
  - Zhang Zhong (張中), nicknamed "Iron Crowned Taoist" (鐵冠道人).
  - Peng Yingyu (彭瑩玉), nicknamed "Peng the Monk" (彭和尚).
  - Zhou Dian (周顛), nicknamed "Lunatic" (瘋子).
- Hu Qingniu (胡青牛) is a physician residing in Butterfly Valley. He is nicknamed "Watch You Die and Not Save You" (見死不救) for his practice of treating the cult's members free of charge but not others regardless of what they are willing to pay. When Zhang Wuji visits him, he indirectly imparts his medical knowledge to the boy and helps him slow down the effects of his injury inflicted by the Xuanming Elders. Hu is eventually killed by Daiqisi, who seeks revenge on him for refusing to save Han Qianye years ago.
- Wang Nangu (王難姑) is Hu Qingniu's wife. In contrast with her husband, she uses her mastery of toxicology to kill people. The couple become rivals in a contest, in which Wang will poison someone while Hu will try to save the person's life. Sharing her husband's liking of Zhang Wuji, she imparts her knowledge to Zhang by leaving behind a book on toxicology she wrote. She is killed along with her husband by Daiqisi.
- Yang Dingtian (陽頂天) was the former leader of the Ming Cult and one of the most powerful figures in the wulin in his time. One day, while he was practising the "Heaven and Earth Great Shift", he discovered his wife's secret affair with Cheng Kun. He was so infuriated and distracted that he entered a state of zouhuorumo and eventually died of internal injuries.
- The Five Elements factions:
  - Zhuang Zheng (莊錚) is the chief of the Metal Faction killed in battle by Miejue.
  - Wu Jingcao (吳勁草) is Zhuang Zheng's deputy who is tasked by Zhang Wuji with repairing the damaged Dragon-Slaying Saber.
  - Yan Yuan (顏垣) is the chief of the Earth Faction.
  - Tang Yang (唐洋) is the chief of the Water Faction.
  - Wen Cangsong (聞蒼松) is the chief of the Wood Faction.
  - Xin Ran (辛然) is the chief of the Fire Faction.

=== Heavenly Eagle Cult ===
- Yin Susu (殷素素) is Yin Tianzheng's daughter and Zhang Wuji's mother. She meets Zhang Cuishan by chance, gets kidnapped along with him by Xie Xun, and they all end up on Ice Fire Island. She marries Zhang Cuishan and gives birth to Zhang Wuji. When the Zhangs return to the mainland and are confronted by numerous wulin figures on the whereabouts of Xie Xun, the Zhang couple choose to commit suicide to protect Xie Xun.
- Yin Yewang (殷野王) is Yin Tianzheng's son and Yin Susu's elder brother. He is also Yin Li's father and Zhang Wuji's maternal uncle. His first wife (Yin Li's mother) practised the "Thousand Spiders Venom Hand", became infertile and disfigured, and fell out of her husband's favour. Yin Yewang then took a concubine who bore him two sons. Yin Li killed her stepmother because she often bullied her mother and then fled from home to evade her father's wrath.
- Yin Li (殷離) is Yin Yewang's estranged daughter and Zhang Wuji's cousin. She practises the "Thousand Spiders Venom Hand" (千蛛萬毒手), a venomous skill which causes her face to become disfigured; she is thus known as Zhu'er (蛛兒; "spider"). Her mother commits suicide to allow her to escape from her father and half-brothers after she killed her stepmother and she has been despised by her father ever since. She encounters Daiqisi, who protects her and takes her as an apprentice. Later, she develops feelings for Zhang Wuji when she first meets him in her childhood. She is apparently murdered by Zhou Zhiruo at one point, but is eventually revealed to have survived.
- Li Tianyuan (李天垣) is Yin Tianzheng's junior.
- Chang Jinpeng (常金鵬) is slain by Xie Xun.
- Bai Guishou (白龜壽) is slain by Ding Minjun.
- Cheng Chaofeng (程嘲風)
- Gao Shanwang (高山王)
- Feng Gongying (封弓影)
- Yin Wufu (殷無福), Yin Wulu (殷無祿), Yin Wushou (殷無壽) are three bandits who pledged allegiance to Yin Tianzheng after he saved their lives.

=== Persian Ming Cult ===
- Xiaozhao (小昭) is Han Qianye and Daiqisi's daughter. Her mother sends her as a spy to infiltrate the Ming Cult and find the "Heaven and Earth Great Shift" manual. Xiaozhao becomes a servant of Yang Buhui; the Yangs suspect her of being a spy from the "orthodox" sects so they bind her in chains to restrict her movements. Xiaozhao runs into Zhang Wuji and narrowly escapes death with him in the secret tunnel. She falls in love with Zhang Wuji but can never be with him because she has to take her mother's place as a virginal Sacred Maiden to save her mother's life. She eventually becomes the new leader of the Persian Ming Cult and returns to its headquarters in Persia. Jin Yong mentioned in the epilogue of the novel that Xiaozhao is his favourite character.
- The Mysterious Wind Emissary (妙風使), Drifting Cloud Emissary (流雲使), and Bright Moon Emissary (輝月使) are in charge of safekeeping the Ming Cult's sacred artefacts – the Holy Flame Tablets (聖火令). They are also the most powerful fighters in the Persian Ming Cult, capable of defeating Zhang Wuji, Xie Xun and Daiqisi with their unconventional martial arts.
- The 12 Guardian Kings of the Persian Ming Cult come to China to search for Daiqisi and take her back to Persia. They are the King of Great Sacredness (大聖王), King of Wisdom (智慧王), King of Victory (常勝王), King–Keeper of the Flame (掌火王), King of Diligence (勤修王), King of Equality (平等王), King of Confidence (信心王), King of Suppressing Evil (鎮惡王), King of Uprightness (正直王), King of Merit (功德王), King of Unity (齊心王), and King of Brightness (俱明王).

== Yuan Empire ==
- Chaghan Temür (察罕特穆兒), the Prince of Ruyang (汝陽王), is a Mongol nobleman, and the father of Wang Baobao and Zhao Min. The Yuan government tasks him with eliminating the Ming Cult and other rebel forces.
- Lady Han (韓姬) is Chaghan Temür's concubine who is killed by Fan Yao.
- Köke Temür (擴廓帖木兒), also known by his Sinicised name Wang Baobao (王保保), is Chaghan Temür's son and Zhao Min's brother.
- Lu Zhangke (鹿杖客) and He Biweng (鶴筆翁) are the Xuanming Elders (玄冥二老) serving under Chaghan Temür. They specialise in the "Xuanming Divine Palm" (玄冥神掌), which they once used on Zhang Wuji. Later, after seeing how powerful Zhou Zhiruo has become from mastering the Jiuyang Zhenjing, they attempt to seize the book from her but are unwilling to share it with each other so they start fighting over the manual. Zhang Wuji and Zhao Min show up to help Zhou Zhiruo and defeat the Xuanming Elders.
- Fang Dongbai (方東白), also called Ada (阿大), is nicknamed "Eight Arms Divine Swordsman" (八臂神劍) for his formidable swordsmanship. Originally an elder of the Beggar Clan, he had faked his death and become a servant of Chaghan Temür.
- Aer (阿二), Asan (阿三), and Gangxiang (剛相) are Huogong Toutuo's apprentices who serve under Chaghan Temür. They are responsible for massacring members of the Dragon Gate Security Service, paralysing Yu Daiyan, injuring Yin Liting, and attempting to assassinate Zhang Sanfeng. Zhang Wuji defeats Aer and Asan when Zhao Min calls on them to fight him.
- Zhao Yishang (趙一傷), Qian Erbai (錢二敗), Sun Sanhui (孫三毀), Li Sicui (李四摧), Zhou Wushu (周五輸), Wu Liupo (吳六破), Zheng Qimie (鄭七滅), and Wang Bashuai (王八衰), collectively known as the "Divine Arrow Eight Heroes" (神箭八雄), are a group of eight martial artists serving under Chaghan Temür.

== Wudang Sect ==
- Zhang Sanfeng (張三丰) is the founder and leader of the Wudang Sect. Previously known as Zhang Junbao (張君寶), he had learnt part of the Jiuyang Zhenjing while he was in the Shaolin Sect. He was expelled from Shaolin after the monks mistakenly believed that he had secretly learnt Shaolin martial arts without formal approval. Several years later, he founded the Wudang Sect, which has become one of the six major "orthodox" sects in the wulin.
- The "Seven Heroes of Wudang" (武當七俠) are Zhang Sanfeng's first seven apprentices named after seven beautiful sights which collectively form a landscape painting: yuanqiao ("distant bridge"); lianzhou ("lotus boat"); daiyan ("rock of Mount Tai"); songxi ("pine stream"); cuishan ("green mountains"); liting ("pear-shaped pavilion"); and shenggu ("echoic valley").
  - Song Yuanqiao (宋遠橋) is a reputable swordsman and the most likely candidate to succeed his master as Wudang's leader. However, he is disgraced by his son's misconduct and loses the opportunity to be Wudang's leader. Zhang Sanfeng orders him to spend the rest of his life in solitude.
  - Yu Lianzhou (俞蓮舟) is the most powerful in martial arts among the seven who eventually succeeds his master as the leader of Wudang.
  - Yu Daiyan (俞岱巖) was ambushed and paralysed by Asan and lost the use of his limbs. He receives medical treatment from Zhang Wuji 20 years after his injury but only manages to recover partially and can no longer utilise his full potential. He spends the rest of his life imparting his knowledge of Wudang martial arts to the later generations.
  - Zhang Songxi (張松溪) is the most intelligent among the seven who occasionally provides advice to his fellows.
  - Zhang Cuishan (張翠山) is Zhang Wuji's father and the most talented among the seven. Apart from being an accomplished swordsman, he is also well versed in scholarly arts and calligraphy. He meets Yin Susu by chance and they are both kidnapped by Xie Xun; all three of them end up on Ice Fire Island, where they settle down for ten years. Zhang marries Yin and they have a son, Zhang Wuji; Zhang also becomes sworn brothers with Xie Xun, who becomes his son's godfather. After the Zhang family return to the mainland, they are cornered by numerous wulin figures demanding to know the whereabouts of Xie Xun. Zhang Cuishan and Yin Susu refuse to reveal Xie Xun's location and eventually choose to take their own lives.
  - Yin Liting (殷梨亭) was Ji Xiaofu's fiancé. Their engagement ended when she realised that she loved Yang Xiao and was already pregnant with Yang's child. Many years later, after Yin Liting is injured in the same way as Yu Daiyan, her daughter Yang Buhui nurses him back to health and falls in love with him when he is recovering. Yin marries Yang Buhui eventually despite their age gap, and they are expecting a child towards the end of the novel. He is the most skilled swordsman of the seven.
  - Mo Shenggu (莫聲谷) is the youngest of the seven and the most hot-tempered one. He tries to discipline Song Qingshu after discovering the latter's voyeuristic attempts on Zhou Zhiruo and the Emei Sect's members. However, he is ambushed by Chen Youliang and accidentally killed by Song Qingshu.
- Song Qingshu (宋青書) is Song Yuanqiao's arrogant, spoiled son. His strong crush on Zhou Zhiruo makes him become extremely jealous when he sees Zhang Wuji and Zhou developing a romantic relationship. That ultimately becomes his weakness because it allows him to be manipulated easily by Chen Youliang and Cheng Kun into doing anything to win Zhou Zhiruo's heart and prove that he is better than Zhang Wuji. After killing Mo Shenggu, he betrays the Wudang Sect and reluctantly joins the Beggar Clan and helps Chen Youliang. Later, after Zhang Wuji reneges on his promise to marry Zhao Min instead as that is his true love, Zhou Zhiruo pretends to agree to marry Song Qingshu and teaches him the "Nine Yin White Bone Claw" (九陰白骨爪) while plotting to use him to take her revenge on Zhang Wuji. In the end, Song Qingshu is defeated by Yu Lianzhou and taken back to the Wudang Sect, where he is executed by Zhang Sanfeng for his crimes.
- Qingfeng (清風) and Mingyue (明月) are two boys serving as attendants to Zhang Sanfeng. They are also close to Zhang Wuji.
- Lingxuzi (靈虛子) is Yu Daiyan's most senior apprentice.
- Zhike Daoren (知客道人) is Yu Lianzhou's apprentice.

== Emei Sect ==
- Guo Xiang (郭襄) was the younger daughter of Guo Jing and Huang Rong. In the prologue, she met the Shaolin monk Jueyuan and his apprentice Zhang Junbao. Jueyuan recited the Jiuyang Zhenjing to her, Zhang Junbao and Wuse before his death. Guo Xiang's prowess in martial arts improved after she integrated the manual's skills into her existing ones. She inherited the Heaven-Reliant Sword and the knowledge of the secrets in the weapons from her family during the Battle of Xiangyang. After her family members sacrificed their lives to defend Xiangyang from Mongol invaders, she continued to roam the wulin for years before settling down on Mount Emei, where she founded the Emei Sect.
- Miejue (滅絕; literally "destroy and eliminate") is the radically dogmatic leader of Emei. She aims to purge the wulin of evil and make Emei the leading "orthodox" sect. Her dogmatic and extreme views lead her to commit various ethically and morally vicious deeds, including the indiscriminate slaughter of everyone associated with the Ming Cult and "unorthodox" sects. She hates the Ming Cult because of Yang Xiao's indirect involvement in the events leading to Guhongzi's death. At Wan'an Monastery, she names Zhou Zhiruo her successor and plunges to her death from the tower after refusing Zhang Wuji's help.
- Fengling (風陵) was Miejue's master and predecessor as Emei's leader.
- Guhongzi (孤鴻子) was Miejue's senior who challenged Yang Xiao to a duel. He borrowed Miejue's Heaven-Reliant Sword in the hope that it would give him an advantage. However, he lost to Yang Xiao and the sword was seized from him by Yang before he could even unsheathe it. Yang made some unkind remarks, threw the sword to the ground and walked away. Guhongzi felt disgraced and insulted and eventually died in frustration. His death caused Miejue to hold a grudge against Yang and the Ming Cult.
- Ji Xiaofu (紀曉芙) is one of Miejue's apprentices who is seen as a potential successor to her master. She is originally Yin Liting's fiancée but falls in love with Yang Xiao instead and bears him a daughter. She secretly leaves Emei to raise her child, whom she names "Buhui" (literally "no regrets") to reflect her love for Yang Xiao. At one point, she meets Zhang Wuji, who has just lost his parents, and makes an attempt to alleviate his grief; Zhang Wuji sees her as a mother-like figure and appreciates her for caring, and she treats him like a son after meeting him again years later. Miejue eventually tracks her down and forces her to kill Yang Xiao, but she refuses and is killed by her master in grief.
- Ding Minjun (丁敏君) is one of Miejue's most senior apprentices. She is jealous that their master favours Ji Xiaofu and later Zhou Zhiruo. Peng Yingyu once remarked that she is "ugly in appearance and evil-hearted" after she blinded his right eye. She once appoints herself as Emei's acting leader when Zhou Zhiruo goes missing, but her peers are reluctant to follow her because of her selfishness.
- Bei Jinyi (貝錦儀) is one of Miejue's apprentices and a junior of Ding Minjun and Ji Xiaofu. When her master orders her to pursue and kill Yang Buhui, she decides to spare the girl on account of her past relations with Ji Xiaofu, so she lies to Miejue that the girl has already escaped.
- Zhao Lingzhu (趙靈珠)
- Li Mingxia (李明霞)
- Su Mengqing (蘇夢清)
- Fang Bilin (方碧琳)
- Jingxuan (靜玄) is accidentally injured by Zhang Wuji when she was making her way to Bright Peak. She collects the remains of the broken Heaven-Reliant Sword at the end of the story.
- Jinghui (靜慧) is an impulsive nun who explains to Zhang Wuji the truth about Zhou Zhiruo's relationship with Song Qingshu.
- Jingxu (靜虛) is killed by Wei Yixiao during her journey to Bright Peak.
- Jingzhao (靜照) attempts to assassinate Xie Xun at Shaolin.
- Jingjia (靜迦) kills Situ Qianzhong and Xia Zhou at Shaolin with the Thunderbolt Fire Bombs.
- Jingkong (靜空)
- Jingxian (靜閒)
- Jingzhen (靜真)
- Jingdao (靜道)
- Jingfeng (靜風)
- Jingxin (靜心)
- Jinghe (靜和)

== Shaolin Sect ==
- Jueyuan (覺遠) was a Shaolin monk in charge of the library. He did not know martial arts and spent his time reading and teaching his secular apprentice Zhang Junbao. During this time, he found the Jiuyang Zhenjing hidden in a copy of the Laṅkāvatāra Sūtra, and learnt the techniques in the book, gradually building up immense neigong. While helping his fellow monks fend off He Zudao (who had come to challenge Shaolin), he revealed his neigong prowess and got into trouble. After Huogong Toutuo's betrayal, the Shaolin Sect had laid down a rule forbidding their members from learning martial arts or neigong without authorisation, and Jueyuan had unknowingly broken this rule. While fleeing with Zhang Junbao to avoid punishment, he exhausted all his neigong and ended up on the verge of death. Before dying, he recited the Jiuyang Zhenjing to Zhang Junbao and Guo Xiang, who respectively founded the Wudang and Emei Sects later.
- Wuse (無色) was Jueyuan's senior and the head of the Arhat Hall. When Jueyuan and Zhang Junbao got into trouble in Shaolin, he secretly helped them escape. As Jueyuan was reciting the Jiuyang Zhenjing before his death, he overheard part of it and later created the neigong technique "Shaolin Nine Yang Skill".
- Wuxiang (無相) was Jueyuan's senior and the head of the Bodhidharma Hall.
- Tianming (天鳴) was the abbot of Shaolin during Jueyuan's time.
- Cheng Kun (成昆), nicknamed "Primordial Chaos Thunderbolt Hand" (混元霹靂手), is a scheming villain who had a secret affair with Yang Dingtian's wife. Yang, who was practising the "Heaven and Earth Great Shift" when he discovered the affair, died after entering a state of zouhuorumo due to the distraction. Yang's wife felt guilty so she committed suicide to join her husband. Cheng Kun has since held a grudge against the Ming Cult, seeking to destroy it. Hiding his past, he joined the Shaolin Sect as a monk named Yuanzhen (圓真). During this time, he manipulated the Ming Cult and the six major "orthodox" sects into fighting each other. He also pretended to take Xie Xun as his apprentice and later murdered Xie's family in cold blood. Although he dislikes the Mongols, he reluctantly serves an adviser to Chaghan Temür. As the story progresses, he becomes corrupted by his lust for power and plots with Chen Youliang to dominate the wulin, but their plan is foiled by Zhang Wuji and others. He is eventually defeated and blinded by Xie Xun, and becomes a handicap for the rest of his life.
- Kongwen (空聞) is the abbot of Shaolin who prioritises safeguarding Shaolin's reputation. Misled by Cheng Kun, he hosts the Lion Slaying Ceremony at Shaolin to execute Xie Xun for his crimes.
- Kongzhi (空智) is a hot-tempered and spiteful individual who holds a grudge against the Wudang Sect, seeing it as a knockoff of Shaolin. He refuses to thank Zhang Wuji for saving him at Wan'an Monastery.
- Kongxing (空性) fights with Zhang Wuji during the battle at Bright Peak using the "Dragon Claw Hand". Zhang Wuji learns the skill by sensing Kongxing's neigong flow, and uses it to defeat Kongxing, who is so impressed. Kongxing is later killed by Asan.
- Kongjian (空見) attempted to appease Xie Xun by allowing the latter to kill him without defending himself. Xie Xun later often regretted killing Kongjian.
- Du'e (渡厄), Dujie (渡劫), and Dunan (渡難) are three elderly Shaolin monks who form the Vajra Evil Subduing Ring (金剛伏魔圈) to guard Xie Xun when he is held captive in Shaolin. Over 30 years ago, they fought with Yang Dingtian after being instigated by Cheng Kun, and suffered injuries. Since then, they have retreated into a state of "withering meditation". They become more aware of Cheng Kun's deeds after listening to Zhang Wuji's explanation.
- Huogong Toutuo (火工頭陀) was a Shaolin traitor who fled to the Western Regions, where he founded the Vajra Sect (金剛門). Three of his apprentices serve under Chaghan Temür.

== Kunlun Sect ==
- He Zudao (何足道) was a senior member of the Kunlun Sect who mastered three arts – swordsmanship, weiqi, and guqin. He fell in love with Guo Xiang at first sight and helped her fend off some attackers. He had met Yinkexi, who stole the Jiuyang Zhenjing from the Shaolin Sect and misheard that the "manual is in the oil" when Yinkexi actually meant "the manual is in the ape". After Zhang Junbao defeated him, he swore never to return to central China and had remained in the western regions until his death. His name is a word play on an archaic Chinese phrase, hezudao ("no need to mention").
- He Taichong (何太沖) is the leader of the Kunlun Sect. He and his wife try to kill Zhang Wuji and Yang Buhui after Zhang saves his concubine from death, but Yang Xiao saves the two children. Later, he attempts to kill Xie Xun, who is held captive in Shaolin, so that he can take the Dragon-Slaying Saber, but ends up being killed by the three Shaolin elders.
- Ban Shuxian (斑淑嫻) is He Taichong's wife and a highly-skilled swordswoman. She is killed along with her husband by the three Shaolin elders while attempting to kill Xie Xun.
- Xihuazi (西華子) is Ban Shuxian's apprentice.
- Wei Siniang (衛四娘) is He Taichong's apprentice.
- Wugu (五姑) is He Taichong's concubine who has been poisoned by a jealous Ban Shuxian. Zhang Wuji helps to cure her.
- Zhan Chun (詹春) and Su Xizhi (蘇習之) are two Kunlun members in love with each other. They refuse to help Zhang Wuji when they see he is about to be poisoned by Ban Shuxian.
- Bailuzi (白鹿子) was He Taichong's master and predecessor as Kunlun's leader.
- Gao Zecheng (高則成) and Jiang Tao (蔣濤) are two Kunlun members who are killed and driven insane respectively by Xie Xun's "Lion Roar".

== Mount Hua Sect ==
- Xianyu Tong (鮮于通) is the Mount Hua Sect's leader. Hu Qingniu once saved his life after he was poisoned. While he was recovering, Hu Qingniu's sister Hu Qingyang fell in love with him and married him. Later, he forced Hu Qingyang to commit suicide so that he could marry the daughter of the Mount Hua Sect's leader (his predecessor) even though she was already pregnant with his child. During the battle at Bright Peak, Xianyu Tong is defeated by Zhang Wuji, who exposes his dark past, and incidentally killed by He Taichong.
- The Tall Elder (高老者) and Short Elder (矮老者) are two Mount Hua Sect elders who step in after Xianyu Tong's downfall to take charge of the sect. They team up with He Taichong and Ban Shuxian to duel Zhang Wuji, but are still no match for him.
- Xue Gongyuan (薛公遠) is one of Xianyu Tong's apprentices. After he and several others were injured by Daiqisi, they went to Butterfly Valley to seek treatment from Hu Qingniu. Zhang Wuji heals them but they repay his kindness with evil by attempting to kill him and Yang Buhui. Zhang Wuji kills them by tricking them into consuming a poisonous broth.
- Bai Yuan (白垣) was Xianyu Tong's senior and a candidate to be the Mount Hua Sect's next leader. After discovering what Xianyu Tong had done to Hu Qingyang, he attempted to blackmail his junior. Xianyu Tong murdered him and pushed the blame to the Ming Cult.

== Kongtong Sect ==
- The Five Elders of Kongtong (崆峒五老) bore a grudge against Xie Xun after he stole the "Seven Injuries Fist" (七傷拳) manual from them. Four of them have their names mentioned in the novel: Guan Neng (關能), Zong Weixia (宗維俠), Tang Wenliang (唐文亮) and Chang Jingzhi (常敬之). After they are defeated during the battle at Bright Peak, Zhang Wuji heals them and saves them from permanent paralysis. They feel so grateful to him that they renounce their past feuds with the Ming Cult.
- Jian Jie (簡捷) is a Kongtong member who was injured by Daiqisi. He is healed by Zhang Wuji but repays Zhang's kindness with evil by making cannibalistic attempts on Zhang and Yang Buhui. Zhang Wuji kills him by tricking him into consuming a poisonous broth.
- Hu Bao (胡豹) is a Kongtong member who impersonates Xie Xun as part of a plot with Zhu Changling and Wu Lie to trick Zhang Wuji into revealing Xie's location.

== Beggar Clan ==
- Chen Youliang (陳友諒) is Cheng Kun's apprentice. He serves the Beggar Clan as a spy for his master and manipulates Song Qingshu into betraying the Wudang Sect. He defects to the Ming Cult after Cheng Kun's defeat, but betrays the cult later and becomes a warlord.
- Shi Huolong (史火龍) was the mysterious chief of the Beggar Clan who rarely made public appearances. He was murdered by Cheng Kun and Chen Youliang, who replaced him with an imposter under their control. Zhang Wuji defeats and exposes the imposter later.
- Shi Hongshi (史紅石) is Shi Huolong's daughter. She was rescued by the Yellow Dress Maiden after her father was murdered and eventually succeeds her father.

== Zhu and Wu families ==
- Zhu Changling (朱長齡) is a descendant of Zhu Ziliu who is skilled in using the "Yiyang Finger" (一陽指). He collaborates with Wu Lie to trick Zhang Wuji into revealing Xie Xun's location.
- Wu Lie (武烈) is a descendant of Wu Santong and Zhu Changling's ally.
- Zhu Jiuzhen (朱九真) is Zhu Changling's daughter who seduces Zhang Wuji and tricks him into revealing Xie Xun's whereabouts. She is killed by Yin Li.
- Wu Qingying (武青櫻) is Wu Lie's daughter, Wei Bi's romantic partner, and Zhu Jiuzhen's love rival.
- Wei Bi (衛壁) is Wu Lie's apprentice who wants to win the love of both Zhu Jiuzhen and Wu Qingying. He is slain by Wei Yixiao while attempting to sneak up on him.

== Others ==
- Han Qianye (韓千葉), also called "Silver Leaf Gentleman" (銀葉先生), is the master of Divine Snake Island (靈蛇島) who came to the Ming Cult to seek revenge against Yang Dingtian for severely injuring his father during a battle many years ago. Daiqisi took up Han's challenge on Yang's behalf and defeated Han in the Icy Lake, the coldness of which left him with a lasting ailment. However, she fell in love with him after the duel, forming a union that was disapproved of by the members of the Ming Cult. The couple left the cult after Fan Yao caught Daiqisi emerging from the sanctum in violation of its rules; thereafter, they concealed their identities in the wulin. They had a daughter, Xiaozhao. Han was eventually killed by poisoning after Hu Qingniu refused to treat him because he was not a member of the Ming Cult.
- The Yellow Dress Maiden (黃衫女子) is a descendant of Yang Guo and Xiaolongnü. She appears to help Zhang Wuji in times of danger and has connections to the Beggar Clan. She defeats Zhou Zhiruo's "Nine Yin White Bone Claw" with an "orthodox" version of the skills in the Jiuyin Zhenjing.
- Situ Qianzhong (司徒千鍾) is a drunk martial artist who befriends Zhou Dian at the Lion Slaying Ceremony. He is killed by Jingjia.
- Xia Zhou (夏冑) is a brother of one of Xie Xun's victims. He is killed by Jingjia along with Situ Qianzhong at the Lion Slaying Ceremony.
- Du Baidang (杜百當) and Yi Sanniang (易三娘) are the parents of one of Xie Xun's victims. The couple provided shelter for Zhang Wuji and Zhao Min when they are heading to Shaolin. The couple are murdered by Zhou Zhiruo later.
