= Story of the Sword and the Sabre =

1963 Hong Kong film by Cheung Ying, Choi Cheung and Yeung Kung-leung

- 倚天屠龍記
- Directed by: Cheung Ying; Choi Cheung; Yeung Kung-leung
- Screenplay by: Cheung Ying; Lee Hang
- Based on: The Heaven Sword and Dragon Saber by Jin Yong
- Starring: Cheung Ying; Pak Yin; Lam Kar-Sing; Chan Ho-Kau; Connie Chan
- Production companies: Ho Wa; Yangtze Productions
- Release dates: 15 May 1963 (Part 1); 22 May 1963 (Part 2); 30 June 1965 (Part 3); 7 July 1965 (Part 4)
- Country: Hong Kong
- Language: Cantonese

Story of the Sword and the Sabre (倚天屠龍記) is a four-part Hong Kong wuxia film released in 1963 and 1965. The film was adapted from the novel The Heaven Sword and Dragon Saber by Jin Yong. The first two parts were directed by Cheung Ying and Choi Cheung while the next two parts were directed by Yeung Kung-leung.

== Cast ==
- Cheung Ying as Zhang Cuishan
- Pak Yin as Yin Susu
- Lam Kar-Sing as Zhang Wuji
- Chan Ho-Kau as Zhao Min
- Connie Chan as Zhou Zhiruo
- Lee Hung as Xiaozhao
- Shih Kien as Xie Xun
