= The Heaven Sword and Dragon Saber (1984 TV series) =

1984 Taiwanese TV series

- Intertitle
- 倚天屠龍記
- Genre: Wuxia
- Based on: The Heaven Sword and Dragon Saber by Jin Yong
- Screenplay by: Chu Hsiang-kan
- Directed by: Chen Ming-hua
- Country of origin: Taiwan
- Original language: Mandarin
- No. of episodes: 17

Production
- Producer: Young Pei-pei
- Production location: Taiwan
- Running time: ≈45 minutes per episode

Original release
- Network: TTV
- Release: 14 October 1984

The Heaven Sword and Dragon Saber (倚天屠龍記) is a Taiwanese wuxia television series adapted from the novel of the same title by Jin Yong. The series was first broadcast on TTV in Taiwan in October 1984.

== Cast ==
- Liu Dekai as Zhang Wuji
  - Yu Shih-keng as Zhang Wuji (child)
  - Lan Sheng-wen as Zhang Wuji (teenager)
- Liu Yu-pu as Zhao Min
- Yu Ke-hsin as Zhou Zhiruo
- Tien Li as Xiaozhao
- Liu Te-shu as Yin Li / Ding Minjun
  - Hei-niu as Yin Li (child)
- Yu Yueh-hung / Liu Shang-chian as Zhang Cuishan
- Huang Hsiang-lien as Yin Susu
- Hsieh Chian-wen / Kao I-chieh as Yang Xiao
- Lung Kuan-wu as Fan Yao / Yu Daiyan
- Hsieh Yi-chun as Yang Buhui
  - Tsai Tsan-te as Yang Buhui (child)
- Chan Sing as Xie Xun
- Huang Lung as Wei Yixiao
- Li Chian as Daiqisi
- Wan Shan as Yin Tianzheng / Du Dajin
- Cheng Wen-hao as Yin Yewang
- Ting Wan-chian as Chang Yuchun / Zong Weixia
- Shih Tai-min as Xu Da
- Chiang Han / Chen Chi as Peng Yingyu
- Shih Ting-ken as Shuobude
- Tsui Fu-sheng as Zhou Dian
- Li Chin-kuang as Zhang Zhong
- Yan Chung as Leng Qian
- Wan Chieh as Bai Guishou
- He Wei as Chang Jinpeng
- Yuan Pao-huang as Yuan Guangbo / Situ Qianzhong
- Wang Yu as Hu Qingniu
- Chiang Ching-hsia as Wang Nangu / Yi Sanniang
- Ku Cheng / Kao Sheng as Zhang Sanfeng
- Fan Wei as Song Yuanqiao
- Chang Peng as Yu Lianzhou
- Chiang Ta-chuan as Zhang Songxi
- Tang Chin as Yin Liting
- Tsai Chung-chiu as Mo Shenggu / Du Baidang
- Chang Tai-lun as Song Qingshu
- Peng Chin-wan as Guxuzi
- Tsai Hui-hua as Miejue
- Kuo Li-chin as Ji Xiaofu
- Miao Wei-lan as Bei Jinyi
- Ning Ching-mei as Yi Xiaojun
- Kuan Hung / Chu Pen-ke / Li Chin-kuang as He Taichong
- Cheng Hsiao-wei as Ban Shuxian
- Chang Yuan-ting as Zhan Chun / Wan'er
- Wang Fei as Tang Wenliang
- Hu Wei as Xianyu Tong
- Miao Tien as Chaghan Temur
- Peng Chin-wan as Wang Baobao
- Chan Hsiang as Asan
- Li Chiang / Yueh Kai-wu as He Biweng
- Su Kuo-liang as Lu Zhangke
- Hsu I-hua as Lady Han
- Tu Chin-chi as Kongjian / Kongzhi
- Huang Kuan-hsiung / Chiang Ying as Kongwen
- Tseng Shuai-chia as Cheng Kun
- Lü Yun-pao as Du'e
- Chiang Yu as Dunan
- Wu Kun as Chief Shi
- Ma Hsia as Xie Xun's father
- Chao Sha as Xie Xun's mother
- Yi Yuan as Zhu Changling
- Ting Wen as Zhu Changling's wife
- Chen Wen-kui as Zhu Jiuzhen
- Shih Liang-chi as Qiao Fu
- Chen Chi as Wu Qingying
- Yao Chi-hung as Wei Bi
- He Wei as Second Master Yao
- Cheng Ching as Hu Bao
- Chang Ying-chi as Shi Huolong / Liu Ao
- Lü Yao-hua as Chen Youliang
- Yu Hsin-yi as Shi Hongshi
- He Yu-nan and Chen Ching-lung as the Qinghai Three Swords
- Li Chin-kuang, Li Yung-wei and Ma Chang as the Changbai Three Birds
- Chan Shih-hsian as Su Xizhi
- Mei Chang-fang as the Yellow Dress Maiden
- Li Chun-yi as Shou Nanshan
- Liu Chung-yun as Xia Zhou
