= The Heaven Sword and Dragon Saber (1994 TV series) =

1994 Taiwanese TV series

- VCD cover art
- 倚天屠龍記
- Genre: Wuxia
- Based on: The Heaven Sword and Dragon Saber by Jin Yong
- Directed by: Lai Shui-ching
- Starring: Steve Ma; Cecilia Yip; Kathy Chow
- Opening theme: "Go with the Flow" (隨遇而安) by Wong Jim
- Ending theme: "Love the Empire, Love the Beauty More" (愛江山更愛美人) by Lily Lee
- Country of origin: Taiwan
- Original language: Mandarin
- No. of episodes: 64

Production
- Producer: Young Pei-pei
- Production location: Taiwan
- Running time: ≈45 minutes per episode

Original release
- Network: TTV
- Release: 10 March 1994

The Heaven Sword and Dragon Saber (倚天屠龍記), also known as The Legend of Dragon Slayer Sword, is a Taiwanese wuxia television series adapted from the novel of the same title by Jin Yong. The series was first broadcast on TTV in Taiwan in 1994.

== Cast ==
- Steve Ma as Zhang Wuji / Zhang Cuishan
  - Yeh Ching as Zhang Wuji (child)
- Cecilia Yip as Zhao Min / Yin Susu
- Kathy Chow as Zhou Zhiruo
  - Chin Ming as Zhou Zhiruo (child)
- Lau Dan as Xie Xun
- Chang Feng as Zhang Sanfeng
- Chiang Ming as Song Yuanqiao
- Kang Kai as Yu Daiyan
- Hsiao Ta-lu as Yin Liting
- Joy Pan as Ji Xiaofu / Yang Buhui
- Huang Chung-yu as Cheng Kun
- Vicky Chen as Xiaozhao
- Yang Pao-wei as Yin Li
- Sun Xing as Yang Xiao
- Ku Pao-ming as Fan Yao
- Ku Feng as Yin Tianzheng
- Chang Chen-huan as Yin Yewang
- Chang Hai-lun as Daiqisi
- Chang Ping-yu as Miejue
- Chang Kuang-hsi as Wei Yixiao
- Chao Shun as Zhou Dian
- Kuo Tzu-chien as Hu Qingniu
- Lang Tzu-yun as Wang Nangu
- Lee Li-chun as Zhu Yuanzhang
- Chien Te-men as Chaghan Temur
- Cheng Ping-chun as Chen Youliang
- Hong Lin as Lu Zhangke
- Tsao Fu-kuo as He Biweng
- Li Li-ching as Ding Minjun
- Li Hsiao-chieh as Song Qingshu
- Chin Shih as Zhu Changling
- Kuang Ming-chieh as Zhu Jiuzhen
- Tan Hsiao-lan as Wu Qingying
- Feng Kuang-jung as Wei Bi
- Chu Pen-ke as Du Dajin

== Music ==
- "Go with the Flow" (隨遇而安) by Wong Jim
- "A Life of Fighting is But a Dream" (刀劍如夢) by Wakin Chau
- "Love the Empire, Love the Beauty More" (愛江山更愛美人) by Lily Lee
- "You Gave Me a Piece of Heaven" (是你給我一片天) by Jackie Chan
- "Forgetting Each Other" (倆倆相忘) by Winnie Hsin
