= Emei Sect =

Fictional martial arts sect

- Chinese: 峨嵋派
Transcriptions
Standard Mandarin
- Hanyu Pinyin: Éméi Pài
Yue: Cantonese
- Yale Romanization: Ngo^{4}-Mei^{4} Paai^{3}
- Jyutping: Ngo^{4}-Mei^{4} Paai^{3}

The Emei Sect or Emei School (峨嵋派) is a fictional martial arts sect mentioned in several works of wuxia fiction. It is commonly named as one of the leading "orthodox" sects in the wulin (martial artists' community). It is named after the place where it is based, Mount Emei.

== History ==
In Jin Yong's The Heaven Sword and Dragon Saber, the Emei Sect was founded in the 13th century during the early Yuan dynasty by Guo Xiang around the same time as when the Wudang Sect was established. Guo Xiang is the sole surviving member of the Guo family in The Return of the Condor Heroes. She escapes during the Battle of Xiangyang with the Heaven Reliant Sword (倚天劍), becomes a powerful swordswoman, and roams the wulin as a knight-errant. At the age of 40, she becomes a Buddhist nun and establishes the Emei Sect on Mount Emei. Her apprentice, Fengling, succeeds her as the leader of the Emei Sect. Fengling is later, in turn, succeeded by Miejue.

In Jin Yong's works, the sect's members are predominantly women and its leaders are Buddhist or Taoist nuns. In wuxia stories by other writers, the Emei Sect has members of both sexes, who play equally important roles.

In Sword Stained with Royal Blood, set in the 17th century towards the end of the Ming dynasty, the Emei Sect is briefly mentioned as one of the top four martial arts sects in the wulin specialising in swordsmanship, and it has male members. In Gu Long's Lu Xiaofeng Series, the Emei Sect is led by Dugu Yihe, who is slain by Ximen Chuixue.

== Skills and martial arts ==
In Jin Yong's novels, the Emei Sect's martial arts are best suited for women. The origins of Emei martial arts can be traced to the Emei Sect's founder, Guo Xiang, who was trained in martial arts by her family. She also learnt part of the Nine Yang Manual from the Shaolin monk Jueyuan in her younger days. However, it does have some elements of "unorthodoxy", as exhibited by Zhou Zhiruo when she uses the "Nine Yin White Bone Claw" (九陰白骨爪) after finding the Nine Yin Manual.

Emei's martial arts range from powerful neigong cultivation techniques to the use of weapons and unarmed combat. They encompass the Twelve Movements (動功十二桩) and the Six Specially Mastered Skills (靜功六大專修功). Emei's members primarily use the sword. They also use needles and hairpins, called the "Prick of Emei" (峨嵋刺) or "Jade Maiden Hairpin" (玉女簪), as projectile weapons to be thrown at enemies. The most powerful of Emei's skills are the Emei Swordplay and the 36 styles of dianxue (三十六式天罡指穴法).

Like Wudang, Emei's skills have two sides to them, encompassing elements of "softness" and "roughness" and "long range" and "short range" attacks, all in the same style of fighting. They rotate between deceptive and direct attacks and can be used effectively by women to overcome opponents who are physically stronger than them. Some movements in Emei's swordplays are feminine in nature and are named after beauties in Chinese history and Chinese idioms used to describe feminine beauty.

== See also ==
- Mount Emei
- Emeiquan
