= Heaven Sword and Dragon Sabre (film) =

1978 Hong Kong film by Chor Yuen

- DVD cover art
- 倚天屠龍記
- Directed by: Chor Yuen
- Screenplay by: Chor Yuen
- Based on: The Heaven Sword and Dragon Saber by Jin Yong
- Produced by: Run Run Shaw
- Cinematography: Wong Chit
- Edited by: Chiang Hsing-lung; Yu Siu-fung
- Music by: Joseph Koo; Wong Jim; Frankie Chan
- Production company: Shaw Brothers Studio
- Release dates: 19 October 1978 (Part 1); 27 October 1978 (Part 2)
- Running time: 101 minutes (Part 1); 98 minutes (Part 2)
- Country: Hong Kong
- Language: Mandarin

Heaven Sword and Dragon Sabre (倚天屠龍記), also known as Chivalrous Killer, is a two-part 1978 Hong Kong wuxia film adapted from the novel The Heaven Sword and Dragon Saber by Jin Yong.

== Cast ==
- Derek Yee as Zhang Wuji
- Ching Li as Zhao Min
- Candice Yu as Zhou Zhiruo
- Cheng Lai-fong as Xiaozhao
- Wen Hsueh-erh as Yin Li / Zhu'er
- Wong Yung as Yang Xiao
- Ngai Fei as Yin Liting
- Lau Wai-ling as Ji Xiaofu
- Karen Chan as Yang Buhui
- Lo Lieh as Xie Xun
- Tin Ching as Cheng Kun / Yuanzhen
- Cheung Ying as Zhang Sanfeng
- Wang Lai as Miejue
- Teresa Ha as Daiqisi
- Ching Miao as Yin Tianzheng
- Norman Chui as Wei Yixiao
- Wai Wang as Fan Yao
- Ku Kuan-chung as Song Qingshu
- Tang Tak-cheung as Mo Shenggu
- Yeung Chi-hing as Shuobude
- Chiang Nan as Peng Yingyu
- Keung Hon as Iron-Crowned Taoist
- Chan Shen as He Taichong
- Hung Ling-ling as Ban Shuxian
- Hon Kwok-choi as Kongjian
- Woo Wang-dat as Kongwen
- Ng Man-tat as Hu Qingniu
- Cheung Wai-yee as Wang Nangu
- Lee Sau-kei as Zhu Changling
- Helen Poon as Zhu Jiuzhen
- Chung Kwok-yan as Shi Huolong
- Yue Wing as Ruyang Prince
- Ka Wa as Cloud Messenger
- Austin Wai as Wind Messenger
- Kara Hui as Moon Messenger
