= Tsai Tsan-te =

Taiwanese actress

Tsai Tsan-te (Chinese: 蔡燦得; pinyin: Cài Càndé; born 3 May 1975) is a Taiwanese actress, also known by the names Vega Tsai and Chamder Tsai.

Tsai has performed on film, stage, and television. She was a finalist for the Golden Horse Award for Best Supporting Actress in 1998, for her appearance in Bad Girl Trilogy. She received the Best Actress Award at the Taipei Film Festival that same year. Tsai hosted the 2012 Taipei Film Awards ceremony alongside Sam Tseng. She was part of the original cast of Forever Dialogue, which premiered at the 2013 Kaohsiung Spring Arts Festival.

== Selected filmography ==
- The Heaven Sword and Dragon Saber (1984)
- Daughter of the Nile (1987)
- The Cabbie (2000)
- State of Divinity (2000)
- Angel Lover (2006)
- Dangerous Mind (2006)
- All Because of Love (2017)
