= Zhang Zhong (Taoist) =

Taoist mystic

Zhang Zhong (Chinese: 張中; Wade–Giles: Chang Chong, courtesy name 景華, fl. 14th century) was a Taoist mystic.

== Biography ==
A native of Linchuan in Jiangxi, he was fond of study in his youth, yet failed to take his degree. He then left his books and began roaming over the mountains, where he fell in with a magician who taught him the art. Zhong learned both sides of Taoism: he learned to heal and control of elements of nature. He also learned how to raise the dead, and brainwash people with simple minds into doing his bidding. He became eccentric in manner and took to wearing an iron cap, thereby earning the sobriquet of the Iron-Cap Philosopher.

== Popular culture ==
In the novel The Heaven Sword and Dragon Saber, he is one of the Five Wanderers (五散人).
