= Emeiquan =

Group of martial arts

Emeiquan 峨嵋拳
- Also known as: Emei-men, Emei-pai, Emei-shan-pai, Omei-quan, Ngo-mei-chuan, Nga Mi Phái (Vietnamese), Emei fist
- Focus: Striking
- Country of origin: China, Sichuan Province
- Creator: Unknown
- Parenthood: Nanquan; Wudangquan (Xingyiquan, Baguazhang, Tai chi)
- Olympic sport: No

Emeiquan (Chinese: 峨嵋拳; pinyin: Éméi quán) is a group of Chinese martial arts from Mount Emei in Sichuan Province, one of the major "Martial Mountains". It is known for its swiftness and flexibility.

Emeiquan encompasses a wide range of systems, and is known for its animal-based fighting methods owing to the abundant wildlife of the mountain range, particularly monkey style and its unique Southern styles.

Emeiquan combines both internal (from Wudangquan, Xingyiquan, Baguazhang and Tai chi) and external (from Nanquan) practices. Low stable stances with little hopping are characteristic. Jumps are executed very lightly and quickly, and its movements are very diverse. Many of its most effective techniques are derived from the use of the wrist.

== Styles ==
Systems under the Emeiquan category include the following.

- Yumenquan
- Baimeiquan
- Huamenquan
- Hamaquan (toad boxing)
- Hudiequan (butterfly boxing)
- Panhuaquan
- Huangshanquan (eel boxing)

== See also ==
- Emei Sect
