= Xu Xuanping =

Chinese poet

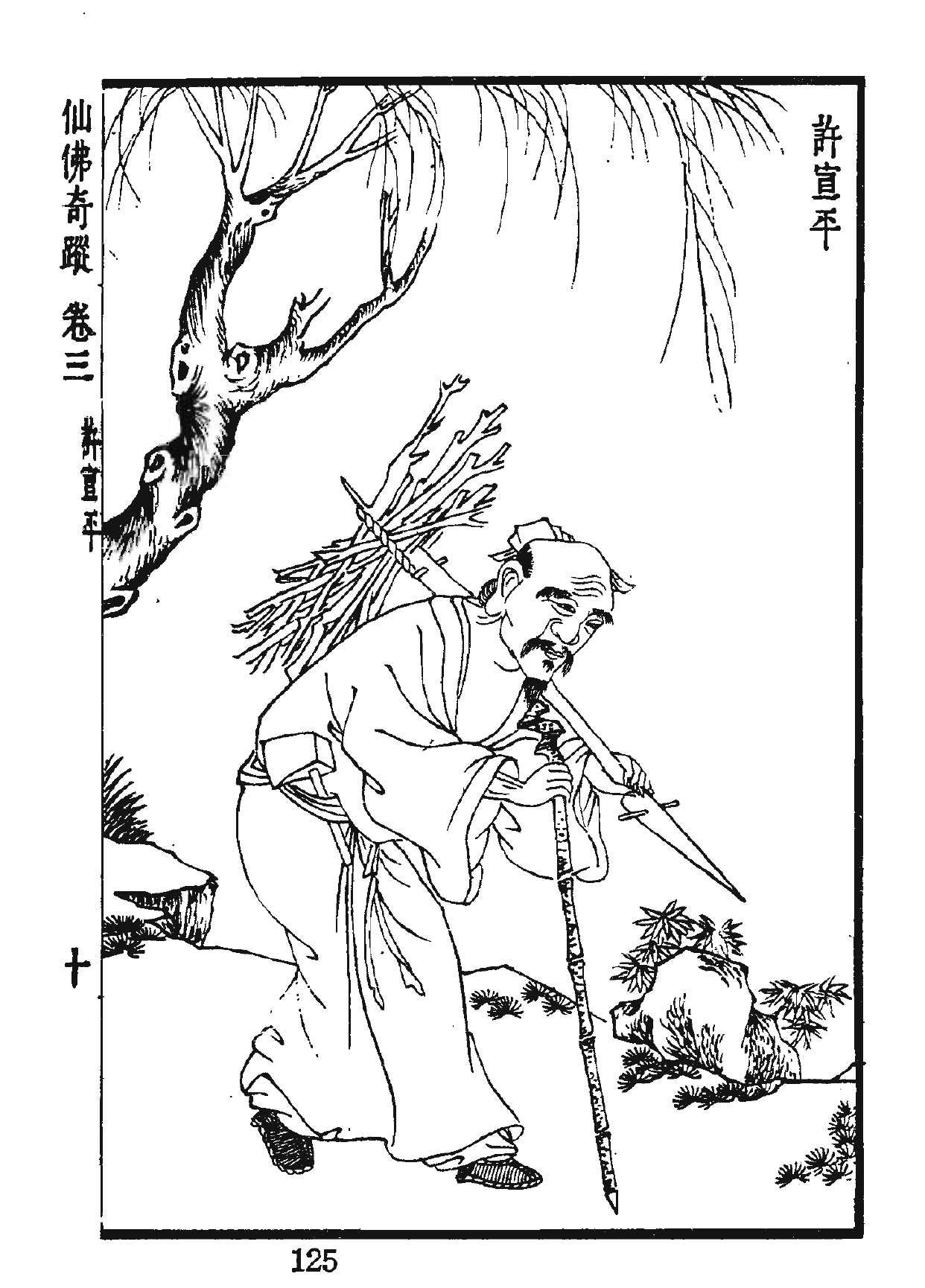

Xu Xuanping (Chinese: 許宣平; Wade–Giles: Hsü Hsüan-p'ing), was a Taoist hermit and poet of the Chinese Tang dynasty. He was said to have lived south of the Yangtze River in Huizhou. His legend relates that he left the city of Yangshan to become a recluse and build a home in Nan Mountain.

Legend has it that he was very tall, perhaps more than six foot, with a beard that reached to his navel and hair down to his feet. He only ate uncooked food. He walked with a gait like a running horse and that each time he carried firewood down from the hills to the town to sell he would recite this poem:

At dawn I carry the firewood to sell
To buy wine today, at dusk I will return
Please tell me the way to get home?
Just follow the mountain track up into the clouds

Li Bai (the great Tang Dynasty poet) was said to have searched for Xu Xuanping, but couldn't find him. He was, however, inspired to compose some poetry, after seeing the Immortal's Bridge, before he departed.

According to some schools of tai chi, Xu is considered to be the daoyin teacher of Zhang Sanfeng, whom they say later created the martial art of tai chi. Other schools hold that Xu himself was a tai chi practitioner, and that the style Xu Xuanping passed down was simply called "37", because it consisted of 37 named styles or techniques. During this time it was also known as changquan ("Long Boxing") as a reference to the flowing power of the Yangtze River (which is also known as the Changjiang, or "Long River"). He had a disciple called Song Yuanqiao who passed the Song family tai chi system down through the generations to Song Shuming.
