= Jiuyang Zhenjing =

Fictional book in the Condor Trilogy by Jin Yong

- Traditional Chinese: 九陽真經
- Simplified Chinese: 九阳真经
Transcriptions
Standard Mandarin
- Hanyu Pinyin: Jiǔ Yáng Zhēn Jīng
Yue: Cantonese
- Jyutping: Gau^{2} Joeng^{4} Zan^{1} Ging^{1}

The Jiuyang Zhenjing (九陽真經), translated as the Nine Yang Manual, is a fictional martial arts manual in the Condor Trilogy, a trilogy of wuxia novels by Jin Yong. It is first mentioned at the end of the second novel The Return of the Condor Heroes, and becomes a central element in The Heaven Sword and Dragon Saber, the third novel. The book contains instructions on how to master a powerful form of neigong which can be used to cultivate a strong neigong foundation for learning higher-order skills, cure oneself of poisoning, or heal internal injuries. It is considered the yang counterpart of the Jiuyin Zhenjing, another martial arts manual serving as a plot device in the trilogy.

The concept of the Jiuyang Zhenjing has influenced later works of wuxia fiction, including Hong Kong manhua artist Wong Yuk-long's comics, where similar neigong skills appear under names such as "Nine Solar Skill" and "Jiuyang Magic Power".

== Description ==
In contrast to the Jiuyin Zhenjing, which covers both internal and external styles of martial arts, the Jiuyang Zhenjing primarily focuses on methods of cultivating internal energy (neigong) rather than combat techniques. It is associated with strong yang energy and is described in the narrative as particularly effective against yin energy-based forms of martial arts.

In The Heaven Sword and Dragon Saber, the manual teaches the practitioner to master the "Nine Yang Divine Skill" (九陽神功), which enhances their internal resilience and strengthens their resistance to poison and certain forms of internal injury. While the initial stages of training are relatively accessible, complete mastery is extremely difficult and potentially dangerous, requiring the practitioner to overcome a critical stage in the circulation of internal energy in the body. Failure to do so may result in a condition called zouhuorumo, which may lead to severe injury or death.

== Fictional history ==
The origin of the Jiuyang Zhenjing varies across different editions of The Heaven Sword and Dragon Saber. In earlier versions, it is attributed to Bodhidharma, the legendary founder of the Shaolin Sect, and first found to be written between the lines of a copy of the Laṅkāvatāra Sūtra. Later revisions introduce scepticism regarding this claim within the narrative, noting that the text is written in refined Chinese prose and therefore unlikely to have been authored by Bodhidharma, whose native language was not Chinese.

In the latest edition of the novel, the manual is attributed to an unnamed martial arts master from Mount Qingcheng. After defeating Wang Chongyang in a drinking game, the master won the chance to borrow the Jiuyin Zhenjing for reading. While studying the Jiuyin Zhenjing, the master found that its skills were too strong in yin energy, so he created the Jiuyang Zhenjing as a counterpart to balance it with yang energy. This reinterpretation is part of revisions made by Jin Yong to improve the internal consistency of the Condor Trilogy.

Within the Condor Trilogy, the manual is concealed within a copy of the Laṅkāvatāra Sūtra in the Shaolin library before it is stolen and subsequently lost for several decades. Its contents are partially transmitted through the Shaolin monk Jueyuan, who memorises the text and recites it before his death. His recitation is heard by his apprentice Zhang Junbao, the heroine Guo Xiang, and another Shaolin monk Wuse; Zhang Junbao (later known as Zhang Sanfeng) and Guo Xiang later respectively founded the Wudang and Emei sects. Their differing interpretations contribute to the development of three distinct yet incomplete versions of the "Nine Yang Divine Skill" (九陽神功), a powerful neigong skill, with each version associated with their respective sects.

The complete manual reappears when it is discovered by Zhang Wuji, the protagonist of The Heaven Sword and Dragon Saber, when he retrieves it from a concealed location. After studying the manual, he learns the full version of the "Nine Yang Divine Skill" and uses it to neutralise a life-threatening yin energy-based internal injury. His mastery of the "Nine Yang Divine Skill" also allows him build up immense neigong, which helps him later when he learns higher-order skills requiring a strong neigong foundation.

== Scholarly studies ==
Scholarly studies of the Jiuyang Zhenjing are commonly found within broader analyses of Jin Yong's wuxia novels, particularly those dealing with the intersection of martial arts with philosophical and cultural traditions. Studies of wuxia literature also point out that the martial arts in Jin Yong's novels serve not only as combat techniques, but also as symbolic frameworks for exploring ideas of self-cultivation, morality, and intellectual development.

Within this context, the Jiuyang Zhenjing is often interpreted in relation to the Jiuyin Zhenjing, with the two manuals representing complementary configurations of yin and yang. Scholars note that such dual structures show how Jin Yong integrated traditional Chinese cosmology and philosophical concepts into narrative devices that structure character development and conflict.

The emphasis on internal energy cultivation (neigong) in the Jiuyang Zhenjing fits recurring themes in wuxia fiction based on Taoist and Buddhist ideas of self-discipline, transformation, and self-refinement. Critics argue that Jin Yong's depiction of martial arts synthesises these traditions into a literary system in which physical training, ethical conduct, and metaphysical understanding are closely interconnected.

The manual has also been discussed in studies of the cultural impact of Jin Yong's novels, especially in relation to their influence on later wuxia and xianxia fiction. Scholars observe that the concept of cultivating neigong as a path to power and transcendence has become a defining feature of xianxia literature.
