= Lin Shen (actor) =

Chinese actor

- Born: October 23, 1980 (age 45); Beijing, China
- Website: Personal blog

Lin Shen or Lin Yushen (Chinese: 林雨申; born October 23, 1980) is a Chinese actor. His mother was the film producer Li Xiaowan. He first appeared in 2012 in the film Watch Sky, and received media attention. In 2019, he was an actor for the television series Heavenly Sword and Dragon Slaying Sabre.

== Filmography ==
=== Television series ===
Year	English title	Chinese title	Role	Notes
2019	Heavenly Sword and Dragon Slaying Sabre	倚天屠龙记	Yang Xiao	
2020	Dating in The Kitchen	我, 喜欢你	Lu Jin	
2022	Side Story of Fox Volant	飞狐外传	Miao Renfeng	
2026	The Inner Eye	女神蒙上眼	Kang Jun	

== Awards and nominations ==
Year	Award	Category	Nominated work	Result	Ref.
2013	16th Shanghai Movie Festival	Most Potentious Male Actor	—N/a	Won	
2017	4th The Actors of China Award Ceremony	Best Actor (Web series)	—N/a	Won	
