= The Heaven Sword and Dragon Saber =

1961–1963 wuxia novel by Jin Yong

- One of earliest editions of book 9 of The Heaven Sword and Dragon Saber
- Author: Jin Yong
- Original title: 倚天屠龍記
- Language: Chinese
- Series: Condor Trilogy
- Genre: Wuxia
- Publisher: Ming Pao
- Publication date: 6 July 1961
- Publication place: Hong Kong
- Media type: Print
- ISBN: 1-58899-183-0
- OCLC: 51068759
- Preceded by: The Return of the Condor Heroes
- Followed by: The Smiling, Proud Wanderer

The Heaven Sword and Dragon Saber
- Traditional Chinese: 倚天屠龍記
- Simplified Chinese: 倚天屠龙记
- Literal meaning: Story of the Heaven Reliant and Dragon Slayer
Transcriptions
Standard Mandarin
- Hanyu Pinyin: Yǐ Tiān Tú Lóng Jì
Yue: Cantonese
- Jyutping: Ji^{2} Tin^{1} Tou^{4} Lung^{4} Gei^{3}

The Heaven Sword and Dragon Saber (倚天屠龍記), also translated as The Sword and the Knife, is a wuxia novel by Jin Yong (Louis Cha) and the third part of the Condor Trilogy, preceded by The Legend of the Condor Heroes and The Return of the Condor Heroes. It was first serialized from 6 July 1961 to 2 September 1963 in the Hong Kong newspaper Ming Pao.

Jin Yong revised the novel in 1979 with a number of amendments and additions. A second revision was published in early 2005, incorporating later thoughts and a lengthier conclusion. It also introduced many changes to the plot and cleared up some ambiguities in the second edition, such as the origin of the Nine Yang Manual. As typical of some of his other novels, Jin Yong included elements of Chinese history in the story, such as featuring historical figures like the Hongwu Emperor, Chen Youliang, Chang Yuchun, and Zhang Sanfeng. The political and ethnic clash between the Han Chinese rebels and the ruling Mongols is also a prominent theme in the novel.

== Plot summary ==
Set in 14th-century China towards the end of the Mongol-led Yuan dynasty, the novel revolves around the struggle for two legendary weapons – the Heaven-Reliant Sword and the Dragon-Slaying Saber – believed to grant supremacy over the wulin, which is broadly divided between "orthodox" sects such as Shaolin, Wudang and Emei and "unorthodox" groups like the Ming Cult, with longstanding mistrust and hostility between the two sides.

The two weapons' origins trace back to the aftermath of the previous novel when Guo Jing and Huang Rong's younger daughter, Guo Xiang, preserves her family's martial arts traditions that later develop into the Emei and Wudang lineages. Decades later, the focus shifts to Zhang Wuji, the son of Wudang swordsman Zhang Cuishan and the Ming Cult-affiliated Yin Susu.

Zhang Wuji spends his early childhood on a remote island with his parents and his godfather Xie Xun, who possesses the Dragon-Slaying Saber. After returning to the mainland, the family is besieged by martial artists seeking the Saber's whereabouts. Refusing to betray Xie Xun, Zhang Wuji's parents take their own lives, leaving their son orphaned. Zhang Wuji is also afflicted by a deadly cold poison inflicted by the Xuanming Elders.

While searching for a cure, Zhang Wuji discovers the long-lost Jiuyang Zhenjing, using its teachings to purge the poison and cultivate immense neigong. Using that as a foundation, he later learns the Ming Cult's most powerful skill, the "Heaven and Earth Great Shift", becoming a formidable martial artist.

Zhang Wuji gets deeply involved in the conflict between the orthodox sects and the Ming Cult. When the six leading "orthodox" sects form an alliance to attack the cult, he intervenes to prevent a massacre and exposes underlying misunderstandings. His actions ease tensions between the two sides, and he is subsequently chosen to be the cult's leader despite his reluctance.

As the cult's leader, Zhang Wuji leads the rebellion against the Yuan government. He rescues members of the six sects from captivity in the capital Dadu and uncovers a conspiracy orchestrated by the Shaolin monk Cheng Kun, who seeks to manipulate both the "orthodox" and "unorthodox" sides of the wulin into mutual destruction for his own ends.

Parallel to these events is Zhang Wuji's complex personal life, particularly his romantic entanglements with four women: his maternal cousin Yin Li; the perceptive servant Xiaozhao; the Emei Sect member Zhou Zhiruo; and the Mongol princess Zhao Min. Zhou Zhiruo, acting under her master's ambitions, manages to acquire both of the legendary weapons and breaks them to obtain hidden items, leading to further conflict and eventual exposure of her treachery.

The secret items from the weapons later aid the rebels in opposing Yuan government forces. Zhang Wuji ultimately thwarts Cheng Kun's schemes and rescues his captured godfather, bringing an end to the prolonged conflicts in the wulin. Although he plays an important role in uniting various wulin factions against the Yuan government, the real political power is seized by Zhu Yuanzhang, one of his subordinates, who eventually establishes the Ming dynasty and becomes the emperor.

Disillusioned with power struggles, Zhang Wuji relinquishes his position as the Ming Cult's leader. He chooses to leave the wulin with Zhao Min, bringing the trilogy to a close.

== The two weapons ==
The two titular weapons, the Heaven-Reliant Sword (倚天劍) and the Dragon-Slaying Saber (屠龍刀), were forged from weapons used by Yang Guo and Xiaolongnü, the protagonists of The Return of the Condor Heroes. The Heaven-Reliant Sword was originally the Gentleman and Lady Swords, while the Dragon-Slaying Saber came from the Heavy Iron Sword, which once belonged to Dugu Qiubai. When Yang Guo and Xiaolongnü retired from the wulin, they left their weapons with Guo Jing and Huang Rong. The weapons were then melted and reforged into the two titular weapons.

Hidden in the blades of the weapons are two halves of an iron-plated map of Peach Blossom Island pointing to a location where the following items are hidden: a military treatise called Book of Wumu by the Song dynasty general Yue Fei; the Nine Yin Manual; and the manual for the skill "Eighteen Dragon-Subduing Palms". The Dragon-Slaying Saber was given to the Guos' son Guo Polu, while the Guos' younger daughter Guo Xiang received the Heaven-Reliant Sword. The secret of the weapons, in addition to the fact that the weapons can only be damaged when used against each other, were the source of the claim that whoever possesses the Dragon-Slaying Saber can rule the wulin and whoever has the Heaven-Reliant Sword can stand against the Saber's wielder. The secret of the weapons was passed down from Guo Xiang, who founded the Emei Sect, to the next leader of Emei. Zhou Zhiruo eventually learns the secret and acquires both weapons, breaking them by clashing them against each other to obtain the two halves of the iron-plated map.

== Adaptations ==
=== Films ===
Year	Production	Director(s)	Main cast	Additional information
1963 / 1965	Emei Film Company (Hong Kong)	Cheung Ying, Choi Cheung, Yeung Kung-leung	Cheung Ying, Pak Yin, Lam Ka-Sing, Chan Ho-Kau, Connie Chan	Story of the Sword and the Sabre
1978	Shaw Brothers Studio (Hong Kong)	Chor Yuen	Derek Yee, Ching Li, Candice Yu	Heaven Sword and Dragon Sabre (1978 film)
1984	Shaw Brothers Studio (Hong Kong)	Chor Yuen	Derek Yee, Ti Lung, Alex Man, Cherie Chung, Leanne Liu	The Hidden Power of the Dragon Sabre
1993	Win's Entertainment (Hong Kong)	Wong Jing	Jet Li, Sharla Cheung, Gigi Lai, Chingmy Yau, Sammo Hung	Kung Fu Cult Master
2022	Mega-Vision Pictures, TVB, Shaw Brothers Pictures International (Hong Kong / Mainland China)	Wong Jing, Venus Keung	Raymond Lam, Janice Man, Sabrina Qiu, Yun Qianqian, Louis Koo, Rebecca Zhu, and Donnie Yen.	New Kung Fu Cult Master 1, New Kung Fu Cult Master 2

=== Television series ===
Year	Production	Main cast	Additional information
1978	TVB (Hong Kong)	Adam Cheng, Liza Wang, Angie Chiu, Wong Wan-choi, Sharon Yeung, Idy Chan, Ha Yu, Gigi Wong, Shih Kien	The Heaven Sword and Dragon Saber (1978 TV series)
1984	TTV (Taiwan)	Liu Dekai, Liu Yupu, Yu Ke-hsin, Tien Li, Liu Te-shu	The Heaven Sword and Dragon Saber (1984 TV series)
1986	TVB (Hong Kong)	Tony Leung Chiu-Wai, Kitty Lai, Sheren Tang, Maggie Shiu, Carol Cheng, Simon Yam, Kenneth Tsang	New Heavenly Sword and Dragon Sabre
1994	TVB (Hong Kong)	Wan Yeung-ming, Choi Ka-lei, Anita Lee, Li Shing-cheong, Ng Wai-kwok	The Legend of the Golden Lion
1994	TTV (Taiwan)	Steve Ma, Cecilia Yip, Kathy Chow	The Heaven Sword and Dragon Saber (1994 TV series)
2000	TVB (Hong Kong)	Lawrence Ng, Gigi Lai, Charmaine Sheh, Damian Lau, Michelle Yim	The Heaven Sword and Dragon Saber (2000 TV series)
2003	Beijing Asia Central Audio Productions (Mainland China / Taiwan)	Alec Su, Alyssa Chia, Gao Yuanyuan, Florence Tan, Phyllis Quek, Zhang Guoli, Zhang Tielin, Elvis Tsui, Wang Gang, Chen Zihan, Tao Hong	The Heaven Sword and Dragon Saber (2003 TV series)
2009	Huayi Brothers, Beijing Cathay Media (Mainland China)	Deng Chao, An Yixuan, Liu Jing, He Zhuoyan, Lemon Zhang, Ken Chang, Wang Yuanke, Yu Chenghui	The Heaven Sword and Dragon Saber (2009 TV series)
2019	Beijing Cathay Media (Mainland China)	Zeng Shunxi, Chen Yuqi, Zhu Xudan, Kabby Hui, Cao Xiyue, Kathy Chow	Heavenly Sword and Dragon Slaying Sabre

=== Comics ===
The story was adapted into a manhua series, illustrated by Ma Wing-shing and Jin Yong credited as the writer. In 2002, ComicsOne published an English translation of the manhua as Heaven Sword & Dragon Sabre. While the plot details remain intact, some of the story's events were not presented in the same order as in the novel.

=== Video games ===
In 2000, Softworld released a RPG based on the novel. The game ends after the battle at Bright Peak.

In 2004, Softworld released another RPG. Instead of the traditional turn-based RPG, this version has a real-time battle system (similar to Diablo), and follows the entire story.
