= Zhang Sanfeng =

Legendary Chinese martial artist

Zhang Sanfeng 張三豐
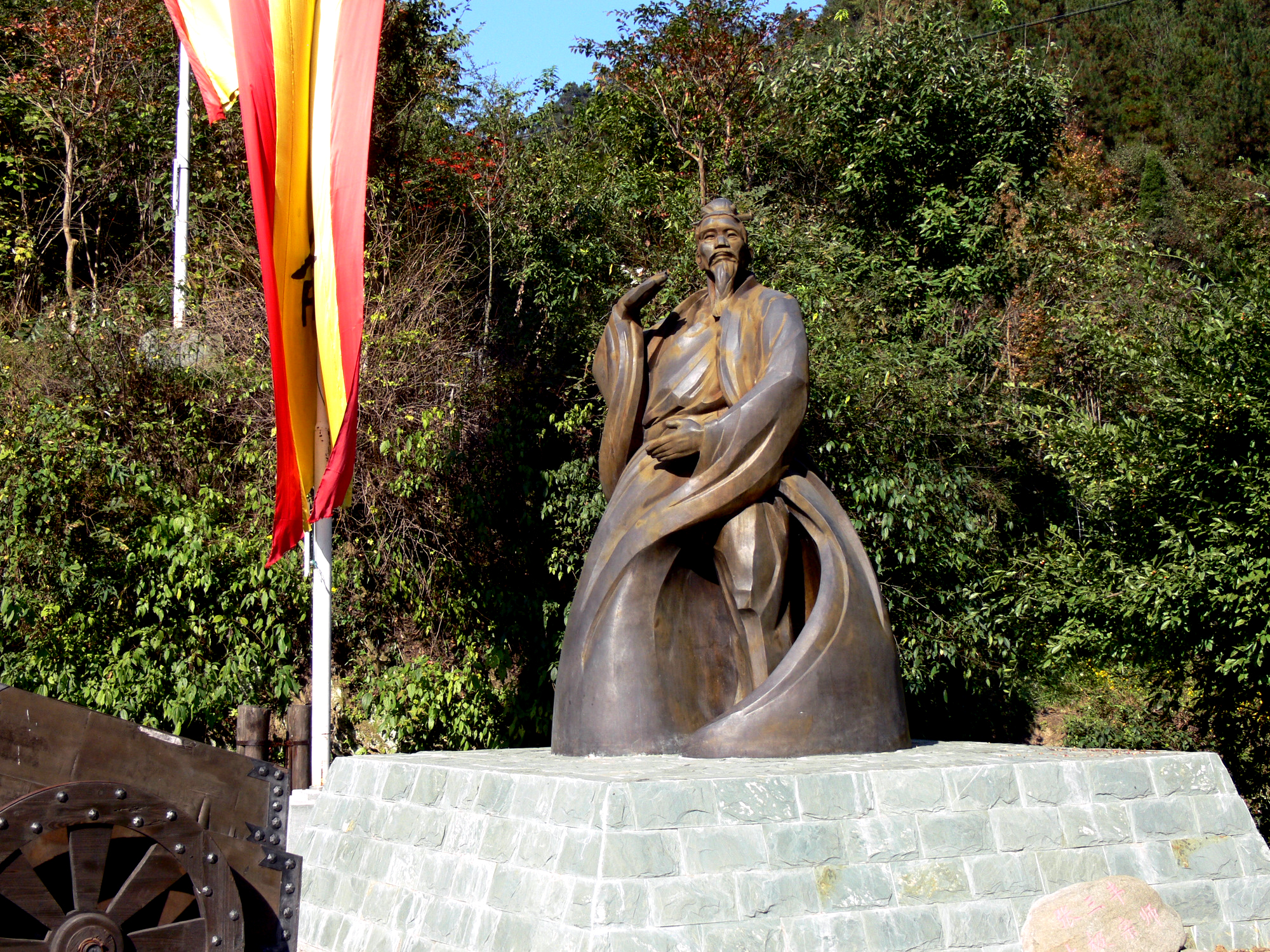
- Statue of Zhang Sanfeng at the Wudang Mountains
- Born: 12th century San city in China
- Style: Neijia

Other information
- Notable students: 13 students

Zhang Sanfeng
- Traditional Chinese: 張 三 豐
- Simplified Chinese: 张 三 丰
Transcriptions
Standard Mandarin
- Hanyu Pinyin: Zhāng Sānfēng
- Wade–Giles: Chang^{1} San^{1}-feng^{1}
- IPA: [ʈʂáŋ sán fə́ŋ]
Yue: Cantonese
- Jyutping: zoeng1 saam1 fung1
- IPA: [tsœŋ˥ sam˥ fʊŋ˥]
Middle Chinese
- Middle Chinese: trjang sam phjowng

Zhang Sanfeng (also spelled Zhang San Feng, Chang San-Feng), courtesy name Junbao, refers to a legendary Chinese Taoist who many believe invented the Chinese martial art tai chi. However, other sources point to earlier versions of tai chi predating Sanfeng. He is purported to have achieved immortality.

== History ==
There are conflicting accounts of where Zhang Sanfeng was born. According to the History of Ming, he was born in Liaoning in the late Song and lived up to 212 years. In 2014, the local government of Shaowu, Fujian province, claimed that he was born in their city. His given name was Tong (通) and his courtesy name was Junbao (君寶, 君宝). He specialised in Confucian and Taoist studies, scholarly and literary arts. During the reign of Emperor Shizu in the Yuan dynasty, he was nominated as a candidate to join the civil service and held office as the Magistrate of Boling County (博陵縣; around present-day Dingzhou, Baoding, Hebei). While touring around the mountainous regions near present-day Baoji, Shaanxi, he saw the summits of three mountains and decided to give himself the Taoist name "Sanfengzi" (三豐子), hence he also became known as "Zhang Sanfeng".

Zhang Sanfeng's life was one of indifference to fame and wealth. After declining to serve the government and giving away his property to his clan, he travelled around China and lived as an ascetic. He spent several years on Mount Hua before settling in the Wudang Mountains.

== Legend ==
Zhang Sanfeng is purported as having created the concept of neijia (內家) in Chinese martial arts, specifically tai chi, a Neo-Confucian syncretism of martial arts with his mastery of daoyin (or neigong) principles. On one occasion, he observed a bird attacking a snake and was greatly inspired by the snake's defensive tactics. It remained still and alert in the face of the bird's onslaught until it made a lunge and fatally bit its attacker. This incident inspired him to create a set of 75 tai chi movements. He is also associated with the Taoist monasteries in the Wudang Mountains.

Huang Zongxi's Epitaph for Wang Zhengnan (1669) gave Zhang Sanfeng credit for the development of a Taoist "internal martial arts" style, as opposed to the "external" style of the Shaolin martial arts tradition. By the second half of the twentieth century, credit for taijiquan's origins had shifted from Zhang Sanfeng to the late-Ming local garrison commander Chen Wangting. Stanley Henning's article, Ignorance, Legend and Taijiquan, criticised the myth that Zhang Sanfeng created tai chi and cast doubt on whether Zhang really existed.

Zhang Sanfeng was also an expert in the White Crane and Snake styles of Chinese martial arts, and in the use of the jian (double-edged Chinese sword). According to 19th-century documents preserved in the archives of the Yang and Wu-styles tai chi families, Zhang Sanfeng's master was Xu Xuanping, a Tang dynasty Taoist poet and daoyin expert.

== Writings ==
Writings attributed to Zhang Sanfeng include the Da Dao Lun (大道論), Xuanji Zhi Jiang (玄機直講), Xuan Tan Quanji (玄譚全集), Xuan Yao Pian (玄要篇), Wu Gen Shu Ci (無根樹詞) and others. These were compiled into a collection known as The Complete Collection of Mr Zhang Sanfeng (張三豐先生全集), which is found in Dao Zang Ji Yao (道藏輯要), a series of Taoist texts compiled by Peng Dingqiu (彭定求) in the early Qing dynasty. It also contained introductory notes on Taoist martial arts and music.

== In folktales, fiction and media ==
=== Literature ===
Owing to his legendary status, Zhang Sanfeng's name appears in Chinese wuxia novels, films and television series as a spiritual teacher and martial arts master and Taoist practitioner. Zhang Sanfeng's popularity among the Chinese is also attributed to his personality and association with Confucianism and Taoism.

The best known depiction of Zhang Sanfeng in fiction is probably in Jin Yong's wuxia novel The Heaven Sword and Dragon Saber, which is primarily set in the final years of the Yuan dynasty. In the novel, Zhang Sanfeng is a former Shaolin monk who founded the Wudang School based in the Wudang Mountains. He has seven apprentices, the "Seven Heroes of Wudang", one of whom is the father of the novel's protagonist, Zhang Wuji.

According to The Complete Collection of Mr Zhang Sanfeng, he might have been still alive in the reign of the Tianshun Emperor (r. 1457–1464) of the Ming dynasty. The emperor, who was unable to find Zhang Sanfeng, gave him the title of zhenren (Taoist immortal).

=== Film and television ===
- Portrayed by Alex Man in the 1980 ATV TV Series Tai Chi Master and sequel.
- Portrayed by Kenny Ho in the 1991 Chinese Television System television series Young Zhang Sanfeng.
- Portrayed by Jet Li in the 1993 film Tai Chi Master.
- Portrayed by Sammo Hung in the 1993 Kung Fu Cult Master
- Portrayed by Eddie Kwan in the 1996 TVB series Rise of the Taiji Master
- Portrayed by Dicky Cheung in the 2002 TV series Taiji Prodigy
- Portrayed by Vincent Zhao in the 2002 TV series Wudang I and its sequel, 2005 TV series Wudang II.
- Portrayed by Yu Chenghui in the 2009 Wenzhou TV series The Heaven Sword and Dragon Saber
- Portrayed by Seo Hyun-Chul in the 2015–2016 SBS TV series Six Flying Dragons.
- Portrayed by Liu Yi Chen in the 2018 film Zhang Sanfeng: Peerless Hero and its 2020 sequel Tai Chi Hero.
- Portrayed by Donnie Yen in the 2022 film New Kung Fu Cult Master 1.
