= Zhou Zhiruo =

Fictional character in the novel The Heaven Sword and Dragon Saber by Jin Yong

- The Heaven Sword and Dragon Saber character
- Zhou Zhiruo in the 2021 mobile game The Legend of the Condor Heroes
- Created by: Jin Yong

In-universe information
- Gender: Female
- Affiliation: Emei Sect
- Masters: Miejue

Zhou Zhiruo
- Chinese: 周芷若
Transcriptions
Standard Mandarin
- Hanyu Pinyin: Zhōu Zhǐruò
Yue: Cantonese
- Jyutping: Zau^{1} Zi^{2}-joek^{6}

Zhou Zhiruo (周芷若) is one of the two female lead characters in the wuxia novel The Heaven Sword and Dragon Saber by Jin Yong. Jin Yong describes Zhou Zhiruo's physical appearance as "beautiful, pure and free of worldly traits".

== Fictional character biography ==
Zhou Zhiruo is the daughter of a boatman from the Han River. Her name "Zhiruo" is derived from her birthplace, Zhijiang. Her mother died when she was very young. When she was 10, her father was killed by soldiers but she was saved by Zhang Sanfeng. She meets the young Zhang Wuji, who was travelling with Zhang Sanfeng, and they develop a friendship. Zhang Wuji leaves them later and follows Chang Yuchun to Butterfly Valley to seek treatment from Hu Qingniu. Zhang Sanfeng brings Zhou Zhiruo back to the Wudang Sect and later recommends her to join the Emei Sect. She becomes an apprentice of Miejue, the Emei Sect's leader.

Zhou Zhiruo meets Zhang Wuji several years later and falls in love with him. However, Miejue hates Zhang Wuji because of his affiliation with the "unorthodox" Ming Cult. She forces Zhou Zhiruo to swear that she must not marry Zhang Wuji or have any romantic feelings for him. The oath is as follows:

"I, Zhou Zhiruo, hereby swear to Heaven, that if I have any romantic feelings for the Demonic Cult's leader Zhang Wuji or if I marry him, my late parents' souls will not be at peace; my teacher Abbess Miejue will become a vengeful ghost after death and haunt me day and night, and should I have any offspring with Zhang Wuji, the males will become slaves while females will become prostitutes in every generation."

Miejue names Zhou Zhiruo the new leader of Emei and tells her the secret behind the Heaven-Reliant Sword and the Dragon-Slaying Saber. She tells Zhou Zhiruo to extract the martial arts manuals and the Book of Wumu concealed in the weapons' blades and master those skills, and use them to glorify Emei. Zhou Zhiruo is unwilling to harm Zhang Wuji, but is bound by her oath to do so. On Divine Serpent Island, she steals the weapons and breaks them by clashing them together, obtaining the secret items hidden inside. She murders Yin Li and frames Zhao Min for the deed.

Zhou Zhiruo reads the Jiuyin Zhenjing and masters a quick-learning and "unorthodox" version of the skills in the manual. As the story progresses, she develops a closer relationship with Zhang Wuji, until she decides to break her oath and marry him. However, Zhao Min shows up and disrupts the wedding. Zhou Zhiruo attacks Zhao Min in anger but Zhang Wuji intervenes and stops her. Zhou Zhiruo feels that Zhang Wuji has betrayed her love, and begins to see him and Zhao Min as her sworn enemies. She pretends to marry Song Qingshu of the Wudang Sect, who has a crush on her, and passes him the Jiuyin Zhenjing and tells him to learn the skills and use them to defeat Zhang Wuji.

During the Lion Slaying Ceremony held at Shaolin Monastery, Zhou Zhiruo defeats all martial artists who attended and emerges as champion of the wulin. However, she eventually loses to the Yellow Dress Maiden, who uses an "orthodox" version of the skills in the Jiuyin Zhenjing to overcome her "unorthodox" version. The Xuanming Elders attempt to steal the manual from Zhou Zhiruo after seeing how her martial arts have improved from learning it. They injure her with their Xuanming Divine Palm, but Zhang Wuji saves her and heals her with his Nine Yang Divine Skill, which inadvertently negates her "yin" neigong and restores her back to her original state. Zhou Zhiruo feels guilty for her sins, especially when she encounters the "ghost" of Yin Li and admits to Zhang Wuji her past deeds and her love towards him. Towards the end of the story, Zhang Wuji tells her that he has decided that Zhao Min is his true love, making her give up on him. Zhou Zhiruo also discovers that Yin Li has survived her attack; Yin Li forgives her for trying to murder her. Zhou Zhiruo visits Zhang Wuji and Zhao Min in another version and makes some cheeky remarks when he is about to help Zhao Min paint her eyebrows.

== Martial arts and skills ==
Zhou Zhiruo mastered a quick-learning and "unorthodox" version of the skills in the Jiuyin Zhenjing, which include the Nine Yin Neigong (九陰內功), Nine Yin White Bone Claw (九陰白骨爪), White Boa Whip Skill (白蟒鞭法) and Heart-Shattering Palm (摧心掌). Previously, she had also learnt the Emei Sect's skills, including Emei's version of the Nine Yang Divine Skill (九陽神功), Emei Swordplay (峨嵋劍法), and Soft Palm of the Golden Peak (金頂綿掌).

== In adaptations ==
Notable actresses who have portrayed Zhou Zhiruo in films and television series include Candice Yu (1978), Angie Chiu (1978), Sheren Tang (1986), Gigi Lai (1993), Kathy Chow (1994), Charmaine Sheh (2000), Gao Yuanyuan (2003), Liu Jing (2009) and Zhu Xudan (2019).
