= Zhang Wuji =

Fictional character in the novel The Heaven Sword and Dragon Saber by Jin Yong

- The Heaven Sword and Dragon Saber character
- Zhang Wuji in the 2021 mobile game The Legend of the Condor Heroes
- Created by: Jin Yong

In-universe information
- Gender: Male
- Affiliation: Ming Cult; Wudang Sect
- Family: Zhang Cuishan (father); Yin Susu (mother); Xie Xun (godfather)
- Masters: Zhang CuishanYin Susu; Xie Xun; Zhang Sanfeng

Zhang Wuji
- Traditional Chinese: 張無忌
- Simplified Chinese: 张无忌
Transcriptions
Standard Mandarin
- Hanyu Pinyin: Zhāng Wújì
Yue: Cantonese
- Jyutping: Zoeng^{1} Mou^{4}-gei^{6}

Zhang Wuji (張無忌) is the fictional protagonist of the wuxia novel The Heaven Sword and Dragon Saber by Jin Yong.

== Fictional character biography ==
Zhang Wuji's parents are from opposing sides of the wulin. His father, Zhang Cuishan, is an apprentice of Zhang Sanfeng, the highly respected leader of the "orthodox" Wudang Sect; his mother, Yin Susu, is the daughter of Yin Tianzheng, the chief of the "unorthodox" Heavenly Eagle Cult. Zhang Wuji was born on a reclusive volcanic island, where he spent his childhood with only his parents and his godfather, Xie Xun. When he was about ten years old, his parents brought him back to the mainland and they soon found themselves the target of several wulin figures trying to force them to reveal the whereabouts of Xie Xun, who possesses the highly coveted Dragon-Slaying Saber. His parents refused to betray Xie Xun and took their own lives. Under the care of Zhang Sanfeng and his apprentices, the orphaned Zhang Wuji wins their favors with his intelligence, honesty and kindness, and they bond after grieving over their loss of Zhang Cuishan.

Zhang Wuji is initially mortally wounded but he wanders into an isolated valley by chance and discovers the long-lost Jiuyang Zhenjing. He masters the neigong skills in the book, uses them to heal himself and becomes a formidable martial artist in the process. Later on, he helps to resolve the conflict between the Ming Cult and the six major "orthodox" sects, which are bent on destroying the cult. He earns the respect of the cult's members and becomes its leader after mastering the skill "Heaven and Earth Great Shift". He reforms the cult and helps to mend its relations with other sects.

Throughout his adventures, Zhang Wuji gets romantically involved with four maidens: Yin Li (Zhu'er), Xiaozhao, Zhou Zhiruo and Zhao Min. Yin Li turns out to be Zhang Wuji's maternal cousin. Even though at that time cousin marriage is allowed, the one Yin Li loves is the teenage Zhang Wuji, not the grown up Zhang Wuji. Meanwhile Xiaozhao has to return to Persia to succeed her mother as the Persian Ming Cult's leader.

Although Zhou Zhiruo is in love with Zhang Wuji, she has no choice but to turn against him because she is bound by an oath she made to her martial arts master, Miejue of the Emei Sect, who hates anyone related to the Ming Cult. Before her death, Miejue devises a vicious scheme for Zhou Zhiruo to seize the Dragon-Slaying Saber and Heaven-Reliant Sword by exploiting Zhang Wuji's love for her apprentice. Zhou Zhiruo secretly carries out this plan and attempts to push the blame to Zhao Min. Later, she turns vicious after Zhang Wuji publicly embarrasses her by abandoning her for Zhao Min just as she and Zhang Wuji are about to be married.

Zhao Min is a Mongol princess and formerly Zhang Wuji's arch-rival as she keeps thwarting his plans to improve the Ming Cult's relations with the "orthodox" sects. However, Zhang Wuji still succeeds in gaining the trust of nearly all the "orthodox" sects. Although they start off on opposing sides, they gradually fall in love, and Zhao Min reluctantly turns against her fellow Mongols to help Zhang Wuji.

Towards the end of the novel, Zhang Wuji saves Xie Xun, who has been captured, and exposes the truth behind the causes of the conflicts between the Ming Cult and the "orthodox" sects. He becomes a key figure in leading the wulin and rebel forces to overthrow the Yuan dynasty, but decides to retire from the wulin after mistakenly believing that the Ming Cult's members are plotting to betray him. He decides that Zhao Min is his true love and they leave to lead a reclusive life far away from society.

== Jin Yong's evaluation of Zhang Wuji ==
In the afterword of the novel, Jin Yong explains that Zhang Wuji has less heroic traits compared to Guo Jing and Yang Guo, the protagonists of the first two books in the Condor Trilogy, and he has a fair share of strengths and weaknesses. His personality is strongly influenced by social factors and people around him, and he has no chance of escaping from harsh reality most of the time. Although he chooses Zhao Min in the end, his love life is in a mess as he is very indecisive on which of the four maidens he truly loves. He may be a formidable martial artist just like Guo Jing and Yang Guo, but he is not suited to lead a martial arts school. On a personal level, he is sincere and self-sacrificing towards his followers, but he lacks the ambition and decisiveness that would enable him to remain in power. In fact, he only becomes the Ming Cult's leader because he is eager to please his followers, who insist that he leads them after he saves their lives.

== Martial arts and skills ==
Throughout the novel, Zhang Wuji becomes a powerful martial artist.

- Medicine and toxicology: Zhang Wuji learnt medicine and toxicology from the reclusive physician Hu Qingniu and his wife, Wang Nangu, when he is staying in Butterfly Valley to recover from his injuries in his childhood.
- Wudang Long Fist (武當長拳) and Cloud Ascending Ladder (梯雲縱) are among the fundamental skills of the Wudang Sect. Zhang Wuji learnt them from his father in his childhood.
- Seven Injuries Fist (七傷拳) is the Kongtong Sect's signature skill. It allows the user to inflict severe internal injuries on an opponent at the cost of long-term damage to the user's internal organs as the user progresses from one stage to the next. In his childhood, Zhang Wuji learnt the verses from his godfather, who had stolen the manual from the Kongtong School. He practises the skill after he has learnt the "Nine Yang Divine Skill", which protects him from damaging his internal organs.
- Nine Yang Divine Skill (九陽神功) is a neigong skill that can heal internal injuries and boost one's neigong. It was written in the Jiuyang Zhenjing, which was stolen from the Shaolin Sect and lost at the end of The Return of the Condor Heroes. The Shaolin, Wudang and Emei Sects each has an incomplete version of the manual. Zhang Wuji finds the long-lost manual by chance and uses it to learn the skill, healing himself completely and building up immense neigong, which allows him to learn advanced skills later.
- Heaven and Earth Great Shift (乾坤大挪移) is the most powerful of all the Ming Cult's skills and only the leader can learn it. It allows the user to sense the neigong flow in oneself and others, as well as translocate and redirect neigong from one place to another. The skill requires decades of practice to progress from one stage to the next, and the user has to remain highly focused during practice or else he/she may enter a state of zouhuorumo and die of internal injuries. Zhang Wuji discovers the manual when he is trapped in a secret chamber with Xiaozhao, and manages to master the skill within hours because the Nine Yang Divine Skill has already equipped him with a strong neigong foundation.
- Dragon Claw Hand (龍爪手): Zhang Wuji learnt this from the Shaolin monk Kongxing during their fight at Bright Peak by using the Heaven and Earth Great Shift to sense Kongxing's neigong flow and figure out the counter-moves.
- Taiji Fist (太極拳) and Taiji Swordplay (太極劍法) are two skills created by Zhang Sanfeng. They operate on principles contradictory to conventional martial arts: instead of relying on speed, power and preemption, their moves are slow, "soft" and seemingly powerless. However, the true essence of these skills is to redirect an opponent's neigong and momentum against him, and counterattack with minimal exhaustion on the user's part. Zhang Wuji learnt this skills after observing Zhang Sanfeng demonstrate them.
- The Holy Flame Tablets (聖火令) are sacred artefacts of the Ming Cult. Engraved on them in Persian are some martial arts verses allegedly created by Hassan-i Sabbah. Zhang Wuji manages to seize the tablets from the Persian messengers, and masters the skills after Xiaozhao translates for him. As these skills were originally designed for assassin suicide attacks, they cause Zhang Wuji to experience a momentary nervous breakdown when he is using them to counter the Shaolin monks' Vajra Evil-Subduing Ring. He recovers only after hearing his godfather chanting the Diamond Sutra, which helps to counter the repressing effects on him.

== In adaptations ==
Notable actors who have portrayed Zhang Wuji in films and television series include Derek Yee (1978), Adam Cheng (1978), Tony Leung (1986), Jet Li (1993), Steve Ma (1994), Lawrence Ng (2000), Alec Su (2003), Deng Chao (2009), Zeng Shunxi (2019) and Raymond Lam (2022).

== Family tree ==
Zhang Wuji's family tree

Yin Tianzheng
Yin Yewang	Yin Susu	Zhang Cuishan	Chaghan Temür
Yin Li	Zhang Wuji	Zhao Min	Köke Temür
