= Wudang Sect =

Fictional martial arts sect

- Traditional Chinese: 武當派
- Simplified Chinese: 武当派
Transcriptions
Standard Mandarin
- Hanyu Pinyin: Wǔdāng Paì
- Wade–Giles: Wu^{3}-Tang^{1} P'ai^{4}
Yue: Cantonese
- Yale Romanization: Mou^{5}-Dong^{1} Paai^{3}
- Jyutping: Mou^{5}-Dong^{1} Paai^{3}

The Wudang Sect or Wudang School (武當派), sometimes also referred to as the Wu-Tang Clan, is a fictional martial arts sect or school mentioned in several works of Chinese wuxia fiction. It is commonly featured as one of the leading orthodox sects in the wulin (martial artists' community). It is named after the place it is based, the Wudang Mountains.

The Wudang Sect is featured most prominently in Jin Yong's novels The Heaven Sword and Dragon Saber and The Smiling, Proud Wanderer as a leading "orthodox" martial arts sect in the wulin, usually alongside the Shaolin Sect. Liang Yusheng's works also depict the Wudang Sect as a leading "orthodox" sect in the wulin. Most of its members are monastic priests who follow Taoist customs and practices in addition to training in martial arts. However, unlike Shaolin's Buddhist monks, Wudang members are allowed to marry and start families. In some wuxia stories, the Wudang Sect has female members as well.

== History ==
The sect was founded in the 13th century during the Yuan dynasty by Zhang Sanfeng, who was an apprentice of Jueyuan, a Shaolin monk. Zhang Sanfeng took seven young men as his apprentices, and they later became known as the "Seven Heroes of Wudang". The seven are responsible for spreading Wudang's name through their prowess in martial arts, exemplary conduct, and deeds of gallantry.

In The Smiling, Proud Wanderer, Wudang has become one of two leading "orthodox" martial arts sects in the wulin alongside Shaolin, and both sects play significant roles in maintaining stability in the wulin. In the novel, Wudang is led by Chongxu. In Baifa Monü Zhuan, set in the 17th century towards the end of the Ming dynasty, the sect is led by a group of five elders.

== Martial arts ==
The Wudang Sect's martial arts have their origins in the Shaolin Sect even though they are more associated with Taoism than with Buddhism. They revolve around the concept of taiji, as evident from the skills named after the concept, such as taijiquan and taijijian. They also focus on the use of "soft and gentle" techniques to overcome opponents who rely on brute strength and force.

== See also ==
- Purple Cloud Temple
- Temple of the Five Immortals
- Wudang Mountains
- Wudangquan
