= Neigong =

Chinese philosophical concept

Chinese name
- Traditional Chinese: 內功
- Literal meaning: internal strength or skill
Transcriptions
Standard Mandarin
- Hanyu Pinyin: nèigōng
- Wade–Giles: nei kung
Yue: Cantonese
- Jyutping: noi gong

Neigong (internal strength or internal skill), also spelled nei kung, neigung, or nae gong, refers to a series of internal changes that a practitioner goes through when following the path to Dao, and these changes may be achieved through practices including qigong or tai chi. Neigong is also associated with xingyiquan.

Neigong practice is normally associated with the so-called "soft style", "internal" or neijia Chinese martial arts, as opposed to the category known as waigong 外功 or "external skill" which is historically associated with Shaolin kung fu or the so-called "hard style", "external" or waijia Chinese martial arts. Both have many different schools, disciplines and practices and historically there has been mutual influence between the two and distinguishing precisely between them differs from school to school.

== Internal martial arts ==
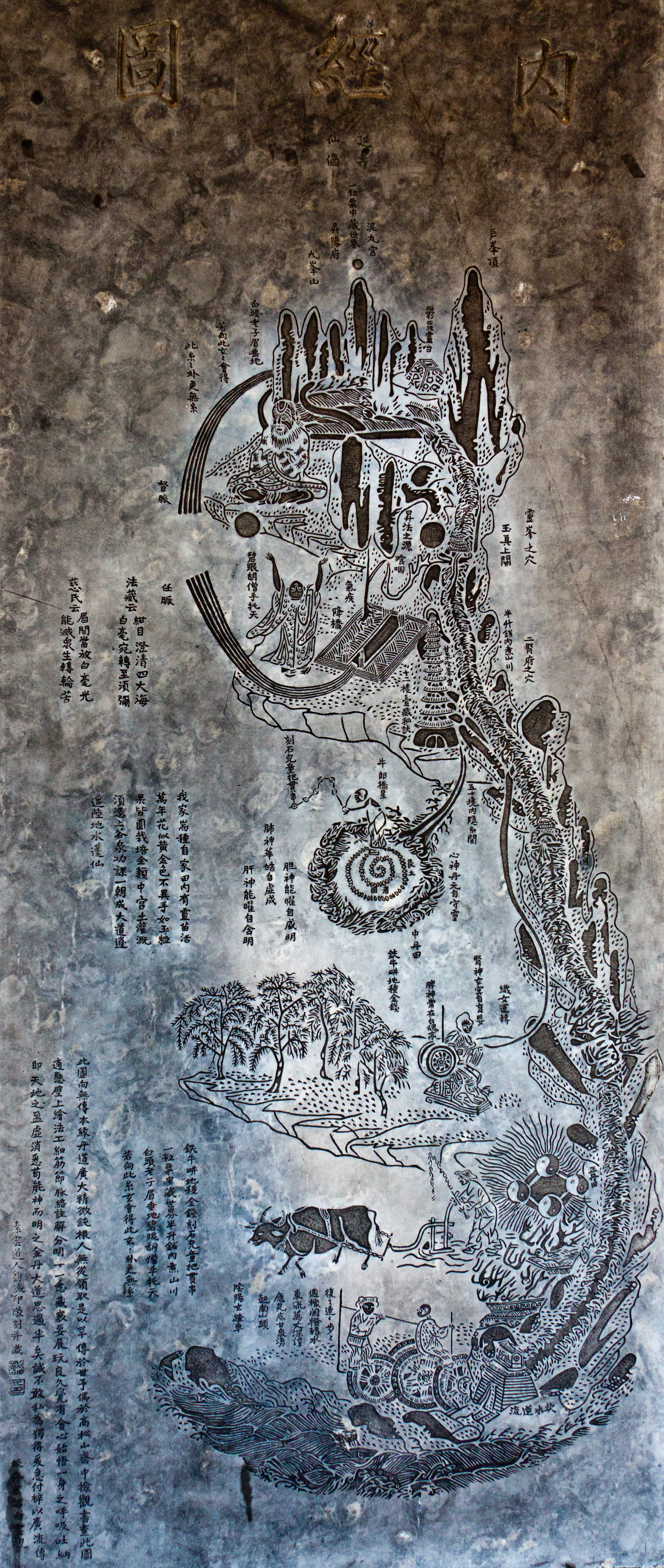
The Neijing Tu (simplified Chinese: 內经图; traditional Chinese: 內經圖; pinyin: Nèijīng tú) is a Daoist "inner landscape" diagram of the human body illustrating neidan "Internal alchemy", Wu Xing, Yin and Yang, and Chinese mythology.

The martial art school of neigong emphasises training the coordination of the individual's body with the breath, known as "the harmonisation of the inner and outer energy (內外合一)", creating a basis for a particular school's method of balancing the mind and body for optimal health and effective utilisation of coordination of intention and power for effective technique.

Neigong exercises that are part of the neijia tradition involve cultivating physical stillness and or conscious (deliberate) movement, designed to produce relaxation or releasing of muscular tension combined with special breathing techniques such as the "tortoise" or "reverse" methods. The fundamental purpose of this process is to develop a high level of coordination, concentration and technical skill that is known in the martial arts world as neijin (內勁). The ultimate purpose of this practice is for the individual to become at one with heaven or the Dao (天人合一). As Zhuang Zhou stated, "Heaven, earth and I are born of one, and I am at one with all that exists (天地與我並生, 萬物與我唯一)".

Martial neigong is about developing internal power. One way to possibly achieve this is to train particular exercises regularly where the breath is matched with movements of blood or to effect the movement of blood throughout the body. Through these exercises it can be possible to move the blood to a particular area during a particular movement to have a particular result. One of the benefits of martial neigong exercises is the relaxation of blood vessels, nerves, muscles and sinews to help the body move more freely. With the body moving freely and an excess of blood moving to a particular area with little or no effort, the practitioner can possibly develop many benefits. These benefits may include:

- faster recovery from injury to the hands
- an ability to hit with more force
- an ability to move faster (speed is crucial in martial arts)
- the health benefits of being relaxed
- an increase in connection to your legs, spine, arms and head
- increased stamina
- increased athletic ability and health
- regulation of blood pressure
- actually experiencing the channels of the body as they truly are, which can possibly be different from the books
- developing an authentic dantian that is consciously nourished and deliberately formed which is not defined in the books
- greater sensitivity for sparring and fighting

== In popular culture ==
Wuxia and xianxia fiction often portray the training of neigong as giving practitioners superhuman powers. For example, one may use qi to attack opponents without physical contact, fly with qinggong, or harden the body to resist weapon attacks. These can be seen in novels by Jin Yong and Gu Long, films such as Crouching Tiger, Hidden Dragon, Shaolin Soccer and Kung Fu Hustle, as well as video games such as The Legend of Sword and Fairy and Xuan-Yuan Sword.

== See also ==
- Silk reeling
- Daoyin
- Traditional Chinese medicine
- Wushu
- Zhan zhuang
