= Jianghu =

Concept in Chinese wuxia fiction

jianghu
- Chinese: 江湖
- Literal meaning: river, lake
Transcriptions
Standard Mandarin
- Hanyu Pinyin: jiānghú
Yue: Cantonese
- Jyutping: gong^{1}wu^{4}

wulin
- Chinese: 武林
- Literal meaning: martial forest
Transcriptions
Standard Mandarin
- Hanyu Pinyin: wǔlín

Jianghu (Chinese: 江湖; pinyin: jiānghú; Jyutping: gong^{1}wu^{4}; lit. 'rivers and lakes') is a Chinese term that generally refers to the social environment in which many Chinese wuxia, xianxia, and gong'an stories are set. The term is used flexibly, and can be used to describe a fictionalized version of imperial China (usually using loose influences from across the 221 BC – 1912 AD period of time); a setting of feuding martial arts clans and the people of that community; a secret and possibly criminal underworld; a general sense of the "mythic world" where fantastical stories happen; or some combination thereof. A closely related term, wǔlín (武林; 'martial forest'), refers exclusively to the community of martial artists that inhabit a jianghu setting. The terms jianghu and wulin have been borrowed into Korean as gangho (강호) and murim (무림) to refer to fiction set in Chinese-inspired martial arts worlds.

== Etymology ==
The term originates from the Daoist classic Zhuangzi, where it is used several times; most notably, in the chapter "The Great and Most Honoured Master" (da zongshi):

When the springs are dried up, the fishes collect together on the land. Than that they should moisten one another there by the damp about them, and keep one another wet by their slime, it would be better for them to forget one another in the rivers and lakes. （出泉涸，魚相與處於陸，相呴以濕，相濡以沫，不如相忘於江湖。）[...] Hence it is said, "Fishes forget one another in the rivers and lakes; men forget one another in the arts of the Dao. （故曰：魚相忘乎江湖，人相忘乎道術。）

== Historical interpretations of jianghu ==
The image of the rivers and the lakes is associated with eremitism in Chinese historiography and literature. One prominent example is the story of Fan Li from the Spring and Autumn period, of whom it is said in Shiji, "took a flat-bottomed boat and floated along the rivers and lakes" (乃乘扁舟浮於江湖) to retreat from court life and live in seclusion. The term "five lakes" serves a similar function to jianghu in this particular context.

Thus, the term jianghu has been used in dynastic Chinese literature as a kind of literary euphemism or poetic trope to evoke distance (from other people or from politics), exile, dislocation, seclusion or hermitism. Famously, in Song dynasty poet Fan Zhongyan's Yueyang Lou Ji, jianghu is set up in opposition to the courts and temples, meaning a world in its own right. Other examples of poetic and literary uses of jianghu include: Ouyang Xiu's literary essay on his boat, Huafang Zhai ("Painted Pleasure-Boat Studio"); Du Fu's poem, Tianmo huai Li Bai ("Thinking of Li Bai at the End of the Sky"), in which he reminisces about Li Bai, who had been banished after the An Lushan Rebellion; Bai Juyi's preface to his poem Pipa xing ("Song of the Pipa") where he describes himself as "floating desolately among the rivers and lakes"; Du Mu's poem Qian huai ("Dwelling on exile" or "My Lament"); among many others. In the Southern Song dynasty, there also emerged a group of poets who became retroactively known as the Jianghu shipai ("Jianghu school of poetry"), named after a title of a collection of their works by literary scholar and collector Chen Qi ("Rivers and lakes collection").

Over the centuries, jianghu gained greater acceptance among the common people outside of the elite literati and gradually became a term for a sub-society parallel to, and sometimes orthogonal to, mainstream society. This sub-society initially included merchants, craftsmen, beggars and vagabonds, but over time it assimilated bandits, outlaws and gangs who lived "outside the existing law". During the Song and Yuan dynasties, bards and novelists began using the term jianghu in the process of creating literature covering a fictional society of adventurers and rebels who lived not by existing societal laws, but by their own moral principles or extralegal code of conduct. The core of these moral principles encompassed xiá (俠; 侠; 'chivalry'), yì (義; 义; 'righteousness'), lǐ (禮; 礼; 'virtue'), zhōng (忠; 'loyalty') and chóu (仇; 'vengeance/revenge'). One of the most notable sources for helping develop the xiayi genre (prototypical version of the modern wuxia genre) and the concept of jianghu as it is understood in modern wuxia fiction is the 14th-century novel Water Margin. In the novel, a band of noble outlaws, who mounted regular sorties in an attempt to right the wrongs of corrupt officials, have retreated to their hideout. These outlaws were called the Chivalrous men of the Green Forests (绿林好汉; 綠林好漢; lùlín hǎohàn) and they then proceed to have various adventures, mixing heroism with more roguish activities. Stories in this genre bloomed and enriched various interpretations of jianghu. At the same time, the term jianghu also developed intricate interconnections with gang culture because of outlaws' mutually shared distaste towards governments.

In modern Chinese culture, jianghu is commonly accepted as an alternative universe coexisting with the actual historical one in which the context of the wuxia genre was set. Unlike the normal world, in the jianghu, the youxia (wandering knights-errant) are free to act on their own initiative, including with violence, to punish evil and foes, and to reward goodness and allies. While the term literally means "rivers and lakes", it is broader than that: roads, inns, bandit lairs, deserted temples, and the wilderness are all classic places associated with the jianghu, places far from government interference. Vigilantism is normal and accepted in a way that would be impermissible in a more realistic setting. Different wuxia novels have their own versions of the jianghu and its implications. Authors vary on whether they have one consistent setting or reinvent the jianghu in each work; Jin Yong's Condor Trilogy has one continuity, whereas Gu Long's jianghu would be distinct in every novel, for two examples.

== Modern wuxia interpretations of the term jianghu ==
In the 20th century, several novelists created fantasy worlds of the jianghu in which martial artists enforce righteousness, fight conflicts between different martial arts schools, or have battles between good and evil. Martial arts became a tool used by characters in a jianghu story to enforce their moral beliefs. On the other hand, there are characters who become corrupted by power derived from their formidable prowess in martial arts and end up abandoning their morality in their pursuit of power. Around this time, the term jianghu became closely related to a similar term, wǔlín (武林; mou^{5}lam^{4}; 'martial forest'), which referred exclusively to a community of martial artists. This fantasy world of jianghu remains as the mainstream definition of jianghu in modern Chinese popular culture, particularly wuxia culture.

In more martial arts-centered stories, a common aspect of jianghu is that the courts of law are dysfunctional and that all disputes and differences (within the community) can only be resolved by members of the community, through the use of mediation, negotiation, or force, predicating the need for the code of xia and acts of chivalry. Law and order within the jianghu are maintained by the various orthodox and righteous schools and heroes. Sometimes these schools may gather to form an alliance against a common foe or organization.

A leader, called the wulin mengzhu (武林盟主; 'master of the wulin alliance'), is elected from among the schools in order to lead them and ensure law and order within the jianghu. The leader is usually someone with a high level of mastery in martial arts and a great reputation for righteousness who is often involved in some conspiracy and/or killed. In some stories, the leader may not be the greatest martial artist in the jianghu; in other stories, the position of the leader is hereditary. The leader is an arbiter who presides and adjudicates over all inequities and disputes. The leader is a de jure chief justice of the affairs of the jianghu.

== Relationship with the government ==
Members of the jianghu (referring to the criminal underworld, particularly that of organised crime) are also expected to keep their distance from any government offices or officials, without necessarily being antagonistic. It was acceptable for jianghu members who were respectable members of society (usually gentries owning properties or big businesses) to maintain respectful but formal and passive relationships with the officials, such as paying due taxes and attending local community events. Even then, they are expected to shield any fugitives from the law, or at the least not to turn over fugitives to the officials. Local officials who are savvier would know better than to expect co-operation from jianghu members and would refrain from seeking help except to apprehend the worst and most notorious criminals. If the crimes also violated some of the moral tenets of jianghu, jianghu members may assist the government officials.

An interesting aspect is that while senior officials are kept at a distance, jianghu members may freely associate with low-ranking staff such as runners, jailers, or clerks of the magistrates. The jianghu members maintained order among their own in the community and prevented any major disturbance, thus saving a lot of work for their associates in the yamen. In return, the runners turn a blind eye to certain jianghu activities that are officially disapproved, the jailers ensure incarcerated jianghu members are not mistreated, and the clerks pass on useful tips to the jianghu community. This reciprocal arrangement allowed their superiors to maintain order in their jurisdiction with the limited resources available and jianghu members greater freedom.

According to Petrus Liu,

[T]he martial arts novel['s] [...] discourse of jianghu (rivers and lakes) defines a public sphere unconnected to the sovereign power of the state, a sphere that is historically related to the idea of minjian 民間 (between the people) as opposed to the concept of tianxia 天下 (all under heaven) in Chinese philosophy. The martial arts novel presents the human subject as an ethical alterity, constituted by and dependent on its responsibilities to other human beings. It is through the recognition of this mutual interdependence, rather than the formal and positive laws of the state, that humanity manages to preserve itself despite rampant inequalities in privilege, rank, and status. As recounted by martial arts novels, the human subject is made and remade by forces that cannot be defined by positive laws of the state—rage, love, gender, morality, life and death. The formation of this stateless subject is incompatible with the liberal conception of an autonomous rights-bearing citizen.

According to Suzanne Brandtstädter,

Jianghu, which literally translates as "rivers and lakes", is, [...] not a thing, an activity, or a kind of person. [...] it rather encapsulates a particular relationality to the world that escapes order, structure, or representation. Jianghu is best understood as any historical order's alterity, a reason why it can signify a particular attitude and agency, and also all kinds of rebellious and mysterious underworlds [...] Jianghu is lived and practiced ambivalence, always escaping political or legal efforts of categorization, regulation, and control. The nearest academic equivalent I found is Harney's and Moten's (2013) term "undercommons" [...] a metaphorical space where marginalized individuals and communities engage in forms of social, political, and intellectual resistance. Here, 'fugitive planning' allows alternative forms of knowledge, social relations, and solidarity to be developed outside the purview of mainstream structures (or indeed, infrastructures).

== Usage in modern times ==
The term jianghu is linked to cultures other than those pertaining to martial arts in wuxia stories. It is also applied to anarchic societies. For instance, the triads and other Chinese secret societies use the term jianghu to describe their world of organised crime. Sometimes, the term jianghu may be replaced by the term "underworld" à la "criminal underworld".

In modern terminology, jianghu may mean any circle of interest, ranging from the entertainment industry to sports to even politics and the business circle. Colloquially, retirement is also referred to as "leaving the jianghu" (退出江湖).

In wuxia stories, when reputable figures decide to retire from the jianghu, they will do so in a ceremony known as "washing hands in the golden basin" (金盆洗手): they wash their hands in a golden basin filled with water, signifying that they will no longer be involved in the affairs of the jianghu. When reclusive figures retired from the jianghu reappear, their return is described as "re-entering the jianghu" (重出江湖). Another common expression to describe the disappointment, frustration and involuntariness one might have experienced during everyday work goes as "[when] one is in the jianghu, his body (i.e. action) is not up to himself (人在江湖，身不由己)".
