= The Romance of the Condor Heroes =

2014 Chinese television series

- Promotional poster
- 神雕侠侣
- Genre: Wuxia
- Based on: The Return of the Condor Heroes by Jin Yong
- Screenplay by: Yu Zheng
- Directed by: Lee Wai-chu; Deng Wei'en; Lee Tat-chiu
- Creative director: Yu Zheng
- Presented by: Pu Shulin; Yu Zheng
- Starring: Chen Xiao; Michelle Chen
- Opening theme: "Splendid Grandeur" (浩瀚) by Jason Zhang
- Ending theme: "You and Me" (你我) by Chen Xiao and Michelle Chen
- Composer: Tan Xuan
- Country of origin: China
- Original language: Mandarin
- No. of episodes: 52

Production
- Executive producers: Bi Nengjin; Chen Wen
- Producers: Yu Zheng; Ma Tian; Wan Yang; Yang Lihui
- Production locations: Hengdian World Studios; Xiangshan Global Studios
- Cinematography: Ye Yunyuan; Jiang Hongmin; Liang Baoquan
- Editors: Zheng Weiming; Liu Xiang
- Running time: ≈45 minutes per episode
- Production companies: Cathay Media; Yu Zheng Studio

Original release
- Network: Hunan TV
- Release: 3 December 2014 – 11 March 2015

The Romance of the Condor Heroes (神雕侠侣) is a Chinese wuxia television series adapted from the novel The Return of the Condor Heroes by Jin Yong, with additional material from the preceding novel The Legend of the Condor Heroes. Produced by Yu Zheng, the series starred Chen Xiao and Michelle Chen in the lead roles. The series was first broadcast on Hunan TV from 3 December 2014 to 11 March 2015.

== Synopsis ==
Yang Guo is the orphaned son of Yang Kang and Mu Nianci. The couple Guo Jing and Huang Rong take Yang Guo under their care for a short period of time before sending him to the Quanzhen School for better guidance in moral values and orthodox martial arts.

In Quanzhen, Yang Guo is often bullied by his fellows and ostracised by his master Zhao Zhijing. He flees from Quanzhen and ventures unknowingly into the Ancient Tomb School, where he is saved by Xiaolongnü and becomes her apprentice. They live together in the tomb for many years until Yang Guo grows up.

Yang Guo and Xiaolongnü develop romantic feelings for each other, but their romance is forbidden by the prevailing norms of the jianghu. Throughout the story, their love meets with several trials, such as the misunderstandings that threaten to tear them apart, and their encounter with Gongsun Zhi, whom Xiaolongnü almost marries at one point.

Finally, after their reunion and marriage, Xiaolongnü leaves Yang Guo again, owing to her belief she cannot recover from a fatal poison, and promises to meet him again 16 years later. While Yang Guo is wandering the jianghu alone, he meets several formidable martial artists and a giant condor, and improves his skills tremendously after training with them. His adventures gradually mould him into a courageous hero and one of the most powerful martial artists in the jianghu.

Yang Guo serves his native land by helping the Han Chinese people of the Song Empire resist invaders from the Mongol Empire, and in time, he discovers his father's infamy and seeks to restore his family's name. At the end of the drama, he is reunited with Xiaolongnü, and they leave to lead the rest of their lives in seclusion after receiving praises and blessings from the jianghu.

== Cast ==
- Chen Xiao as Yang Guo / Yang Kang
  - Leo Wu as Yang Guo (child)
- Michelle Chen as Xiaolongnü
  - Zhang Zimu as Xiaolongnü (child)
- Zheng Guolin as Guo Jing
- Yang Mingna as Huang Rong
- Zhang Xinyu as Li Mochou
- Mao Xiaotong as Guo Fu
  - Jiang Yiyi as Guo Fu (child)
- Sun Yaoqi as Lu Wushuang
  - Hu Shun'er as Lu Wushuang (child)
- Zhao Yingzi as Cheng Ying
  - Chai Wei as Cheng Ying (child)
- Hei Zi as Jinlun Guoshi
- Zhang Xueying as Guo Xiang
- Cui Zhengbang as Guo Polu
- Zhang Zhehan as Yelü Qi
- Ma Yingqiao as Yelü Yan
- Wang Shuang as Wanyan Ping
- Cao Xinyue as Hong Lingbo
- Wu Jingjing as Gongsun Lü'e
- Qiu Xinzhi as Gongsun Zhi
- Zhang Qian as Qiu Qianchi
- Li Shipeng as Qiu Qianren
- Zhang Chao as Wu Dunru
  - Zhang Yijie as Wu Dunru (child)
- Elvis Han as Wu Xiuwen
  - Fang Yangfei as Wu Xiuwen (child)
- Zhao Kunpeng as Wu Santong
- Zhang Yameng as Wu Sanniang
- Guo Yuhan as Shagu
- Christopher Lee as Huang Yaoshi
- Zong Fengyan as Ouyang Feng
- Yin Xiaotian as Hong Qigong
- Zhou Dehua as Zhou Botong
- Ji Chen as Yideng
- Deng Limin as Ke Zhen'e
- Shen Baoping as Qiu Chuji
- Zhang Tianyang as Huodu
- Daiding as Da'erba
- Shao Min as Granny Sun
- Wang Maolei as Zhao Zhijing
- Song Yang as Zhen Zhibing
- Meng Fei as Yelü Chucai
- Kang Lei as Ma Guangzuo
- Yang Long as Nimoxing
- Rong Yaozhong as Yinkexi
- Ruan Weijing as Xiaoxiangzi
- Yao Yichen as Chen Xuanfeng
- Hou Jingjian as Feng Mofeng
- Yi Kun as Lu Guanying
- Liu Ye as Cheng Yaojia
- Li Yilin as Zhu Ziliu
- Zhu Rongrong as Möngke Khan
- Luo Wenbo as Lin Chaoying's apprentice
- Wang Yuzheng as Lu Youjiao
- Sun Xinhong as He Shiwo
- Jian Renzi as Rou'er
- Chen Tingjia as Du Xuelian
- Hu Pu as Fan Yiweng
- Hou Jianglong as the Sindhu Monk
- Ren Xihong as Shi Da
- Zhao Haiying as Shi Er
- Shi Puzhou as Shi San
- Niu Wenbo as Shi Si
- Feng Mingjing as Shi Wu
- Xu Zhanwei as Datougui
- Zhang Luhua as Shashengui
- Du Guanru as Taozhaigui
- Peng Yong as Wuchanggui
- Yu Xiaochen as Baicaoxian
- Shi Zhenlong as Renchuzi
- Lü Yang as Gourou Toutuo
- Tan Limin as Abbess Shengyin
- Wen Wen as Xiaocui
- Xing Qiqi as Li Zhichang
- Yan Yikuan as Wang Chongyang
- Dong Xuan as Lin Chaoying
- Zanilia Zhao as Mu Nianci
- Chen Xiang as Lu Zhanyuan
- Deng Sha as He Yuanjun
- Yang Rong as Mei Chaofeng
- Huang Yi as Feng Heng
- Zhang Danfeng as Dugu Qiubai
- Qin Lan as Hexiang
- Zhang Meng as Yinggu
- Zhu Zixiao as Kublai Khan
- Chen Zihan as Qiu Yinong
- Huang Ming as Long Jiu

== Soundtrack ==
The Romance of the Condor Heroes - Original Television Soundtrack (神雕侠侣电视剧原声音乐大碟)
No.	Title	Music	Length
1.	""Splendid Grandeur" (浩瀚)" (Opening theme song)	Jason Zhang
2.	""You and Me" (你我)" (Ending theme song)	Chen Xiao and Michelle Chen
3.	""Ask the World" (问世间)"	Chen Xiang and Zhang Xinyu
4.	""Sixteen Years" (十六年)"	Chen Xiao and Liu Xin

== Reception ==
Since the series was first announced, it was wrapped up in various controversies. In particular, the casting of Michelle Chen attracted a large outcry by fans of the original novel, who called Chen the "fattest Xiaolongnü" that they have ever seen. When the show first premiered on Hunan TV, it was heavily panned for its bad writing, cheaply made actions scenes, and a plot that completely departs from the novel. Critics call the show "a vulgar mess possessing little artistic value", and "a production that completely destroyed the spirit of the original story".
