= The Condor Heroes 95 =

1995 Hong Kong TV series

- VCD cover art
- Also known as: The Return of the Condor Heroes
- 神鵰俠侶
- Genre: Wuxia
- Based on: The Return of the Condor Heroes by Jin Yong
- Screenplay by: Wong Kwok-fai; Chiu Ching-yung
- Directed by: Yuen Ying-ming; Lau Shun-on; Sin Yin-fong; Lau Kwok-ho; Kong Kam-hung
- Starring: Louis Koo; Carman Lee
- Opening theme: "Myth and Romance" (神話情話) by Wakin Chau and Chyi Yu
- Composers: Wakin Chau; Lam Sai
- Country of origin: Hong Kong
- Original language: Cantonese
- No. of episodes: 32

Production
- Executive producer: Lee Tim-shing
- Production location: Hong Kong
- Running time: ≈45 minutes per episode
- Production company: TVB

Original release
- Network: TVB Jade
- Release: 31 July – 9 September 1995

Related
- The Legend of the Condor Heroes (1994)

The Condor Heroes 95 (神鵰俠侶) is a Hong Kong wuxia television series adapted from the novel The Return of the Condor Heroes by Jin Yong. It was first broadcast on TVB Jade in Hong Kong in 1995. Many of the cast from The Legend of the Condor Heroes (1994) reprised their roles in this series, such as Lau Dan (Hong Qigong) and Wayne Lai (Zhou Botong). In addition, Jason Pai reprised his breakthrough role as Guo Jing, whom he previously portrayed in The Legend of the Condor Heroes (1976) and The Return of the Condor Heroes (1976).

== Cast ==
- Louis Koo as Yang Guo
- Carman Lee as Xiaolongnü
- Jason Pai as Guo Jing
- Bonnie Ngai as Huang Rong
- Gigi Fu as Guo Fu
- Theresa Lee as Guo Xiang
- Gan Pui-wan as Lu Wushuang
- Maggie Cheung as Cheng Ying
- Lau Dan as Hong Qigong
- Chu Tit-wo as Ouyang Feng
- Felix Lok as Huang Yaoshi
- Wayne Lai as Zhou Botong
- Gordon Liu as Jinlun Fawang
- Suet Lei as Li Mochou
- Lau Kong as Wu Santong
- Lee Lai-lai as Wu Sanniang
- Ng Ka-fai as Wu Dunru
- Lee Ka-keung as Wu Xiuwen
- Ho Kit-san as Wanyan Ping
- Chan Chung-kin as Yelü Chucai
- Chim Bing-hei as Yelü Qi
- Choi Wan-hap as Yelü Yan
- Lai Hon-chi as Yideng
- Ng Ka-lok as Guo Polu
- Ma Hoi-lun as Yinggu
- Cheng Lui as Qiu Qianren
- Chan On-ying as Shagu
- Lee Kwok-lun as Feng Mofeng
- Leung Kin-ping as Lu Guanying
- Tam Pui-san as Cheng Yaojia
- Yu Tin-wai as Lu Youjiao
- Ho Ho-yuen as Zhu Ziliu
- Waise Lee as Lu Zhanyuan
- Cheung Yin as He Yuanjun
- Cheung Yik as Gongsun Zhi
- Law Lan as Qiu Qianchi
- Louisa So as Gongsun Lü'e
- Kenneth Chan as Yin Zhiping
- Lee Yiu-king as Wang Chongyang
- Michelle Fung as Lin Chaoying
- Kwok Tak-shun as Qiu Chuji
- Doi Chi-wai as Zhao Zhijing
- Koi Ngok as Liu Chuxuan
- Suen Kit-hing as Wang Chuyi
- Choi Kok-hing as Hao Datong
- Law Kwan-chor as Lu Qingdu
- Liu Lai-lai as Sun Bu'er
- Alice Fung So-bor as Granny Sun
- Lee Kwai-ying as Hong Lingbo
- Ben Wong as Kublai Khan
- Wong Chung-hong as Da'erba
- Lo Chan-shun as Huodu
- Kwan Ching as Xiaoxiangzi
- Lee Chi-kei as Nimoxing
- Chun Hung as Ma Guangzuo
- Cheung Hung-cheung as Yinkexi
- Wan Man-ying as Möngke Khan
- Chan Tik-hak as Sha Tongtian
- Mak Tsi-wan as Hou Tonghai
- Kiu Hung as Peng Lianhu
- Kong Ngai as Ke Zhen'e
- Cheng Ka-sang as Fan Yiweng
- Lee Hoi-sang as Kumu
