= The Return of the Condor Heroes (1998 Taiwanese TV series) =

1998 Taiwanese TV series

- DVD cover art
- 神鵰俠侶
- Genre: Wuxia
- Based on: The Return of the Condor Heroes by Jin Yong
- Directed by: Young Pei-pei
- Starring: Richie Ren; Jacklyn Wu
- Opening theme: "Wild and Carefree" (任逍遙) by Richie Ren
- Ending theme: "Sad Pacific Ocean" (伤心太平洋) by Richie Ren
- Country of origin: Taiwan
- Original language: Mandarin
- No. of episodes: 47

Production
- Producer: Young Pei-pei
- Production location: Taiwan
- Running time: ≈45 minutes per episode

Original release
- Network: TTV
- Release: 25 August – 28 October 1998

The Return of the Condor Heroes (神鵰俠侶) is a Taiwanese wuxia television series adapted from the novel of the same title by Jin Yong. It was first broadcast on TTV in 1998 in Taiwan.

== Cast ==
- Richie Ren as Yang Guo / Yang Kang
- Jacklyn Wu as Xiaolongnü
- Sun Xing as Guo Jing
- Patricia Ha as Huang Rong
- Ji Qin as Guo Fu
- June Tsai as Guo Xiang
- Chen Hong as Li Mochou
- Liu Zi as Lu Wushuang
- Zhu Yan as Cheng Ying
- Hei Zi as Huodu
- Ben Lee as Yin Zhiping
- Bryan Leung as Hong Qigong
- Li Li-chun as Ouyang Feng
- Yue Yueli as Zhao Zhijing
- Wu Chian-chian as He Yuanjun
- Lee Wai-man as Wanyan Honglie
- Dong Xiaoyan as Gongsun Lü'e
- Jack Kao as Jinlun Fawang
- Norman Chui as Lu Zhanyuan / Gongsun Zhi
- Liu Jia as Mu Nianci

== Reception ==
The series was poorly received in Taiwan and in other countries because Richie Ren and Jackyln Wu were seen to be poor choices as the leads. Some "innovations" were also widely criticised (Wu wears a black cloak instead of ethereal white as in the book). The series has also received negative criticism about not being faithful to the original story.
