= Li Mochou =

Fictional character in the novel The Return of the Condor Heroes by Jin Yong

- The Return of the Condor Heroes character
- Li Mochou in the 2021 mobile game The Legend of the Condor Heroes
- Created by: Jin Yong

In-universe information
- Gender: Female
- Affiliation: Ancient Tomb Sect
- Master: Lin Chaoying's apprentice
- Apprentice: Hong Lingbo

Li Mochou
- Chinese: 李莫愁
Transcriptions
Standard Mandarin
- Hanyu Pinyin: Lǐ Mòchóu
Yue: Cantonese
- Jyutping: Lei^{5} Mok^{6}-sau^{4}

Li Mochou (李莫愁) is a fictional character in the wuxia novel The Return of the Condor Heroes by Jin Yong. A member of the Ancient Tomb Sect, she was trained in martial arts by the same master as the female protagonist Xiaolongnü, but had been expelled from the sect before the events of the novel take place. Described as beautiful in appearance, she becomes a vicious killer after her lover, Lu Zhanyuan, betrayed her. However, she appears as a motherly figure to the infant Guo Xiang, whom she kidnaps from her parents. She is seen trying to take the Jade Maiden Sutra from Xiaolongnü on several occasions at the beginning of the novel, but has never been successful. She commits suicide by throwing herself into the fire in Passionless Valley.

Li Mochou is one of the major characters in the novel as the narrative begins with her. Within the story, she also recites the poem "What is Love?", which is a central theme of the novel. She is the subject of the chronicle The Philosophy of Life of Li Mochou (李莫愁的人生哲學) by Guo Mei. This work delves into Li Mochou's life from diverse perspectives, encompassing her birth, upbringing, experiences with love and hatred, and overall worldview. Guo Mei's analysis aims to elucidate and explore the philosophical aspects embedded in Li Mochou's life journey.

== Fictional character biography ==
Li Mochou is a third-generation member of the Ancient Tomb Sect, recruited by the apprentice of the sect's founder, Lin Chaoying. As her master's first apprentice, she is the senior of Xiaolongnü, the female protagonist of the novel.

In her early years, Li Mochou encountered Lu Zhanyuan, fell in love with him, and defied her master to be with him, resulting in her expulsion from the Ancient Tomb Sect. Later, Lu Zhanyuan broke up with her and married He Yuanjuan instead. When Li Mochou attempted to disrupt their marriage, a powerful monk intervened and compelled her to put aside her grudge for a decade. Vowing vengeance, she embraced Taoism and distanced herself from love.

The novel begins by describing Li Mochou exacting vengeance on the Lu family some years after the deaths of Lu Zhanyuan and He Yuanjun. Following the murders, she kidnaps Lu Zhanyuan's niece, Lu Wushuang, and enslaves her.

Li Mochou gained notoriety for her cruelty, earning her the moniker "Red Serpent" (赤練蛇). Yet, owing to her beauty and apparent youth, some also dubbed her the "Red Fairy" (赤練仙子). Armed with her fearsome skill Red Divine Palm (赤練神掌) and weapons such as the Soul-Freezing Silver Needles (冰魄銀針) and a fuchen (fly-whisk), she became unhinged in her killings, targeting anyone with the family names Lu and He.

Although initially one of the most potent female characters in the novel, she proved no match for Huang Rong and later Xiaolongnü, who mastered the Jade Maiden Heart Sutra in the later part of the story.

Li Mochou took an apprentice, Hong Lingbo, and tasked her with seizing the Jade Maiden Heart Sutra from the Ancient Tomb Sect. The plan failed when Xiaolongnü, with the assistance of Yang Guo, triggered a trap. Nevertheless, Li Mochou and Hong Lingbo managed to escape, and Li persisted in her vengeful pursuits.

Li Mochou's conflicted nature prevented her from relinquishing her hatred and desire for her sect's prized martial arts secrets. Relentlessly pursuing Xiaolongnü and Yang Guo for the manual, she failed to obtain it. Driven by obsession and fueled by the love flower's poisonous effect, she met her demise as she envisioned Lu Zhanyuan's image in the fire at Passionless Valley and walked into the flames, sealing her own fate.

== Martial arts and skills ==
Li Mochou was trained in the Ancient Tomb Sect's qinggong and martial arts in her early life. After her expulsion, she created new skills such as the Red Divine Palm (赤練神掌), a palm-striking technique derived from the Five Venoms Manual (五毒秘傳) which allows to poison her enemies. Besides, she invented the Triple Non-existing Hands (三無三不手), an extremely vicious striking technique targeting vulnerable parts of the opponent's body such as the eyes, throat, lower abdomen, and genitals.

Li Mochou's primary weapon is a fuchen (fly-whisk) similar to those carried by Taoist priests and nuns. A flexible weapon in her hands, it is capable of drawing blood, breaking bones, causing internal injuries, and even disarming an opponent by wrapping around their weapon. She also uses the poison-coated Soul-Freezing Silver Needles (冰魄銀針) as her anqi (hand-thrown projectiles).

== Character evaluation ==
Li Mochou's backstory, accomplishments, and flaws make her an intriguing character in studies of Jin Yong's works. Scholars have conducted positioning analyses and engaged in discussions about Li Mochou's character image and behaviour. Liu Baoqiang noted in "A New Discussion on the Character of Li Mochou in Jin Yong's Novels" that she may be interpreted as a pioneer of feminism in her pursuit of love and individual liberation.

== In adaptations ==
Notable actresses who have portrayed Li Mochou in films and television series include Cheung Man-ting (1976), Tien Lie (1983), Lisa Lui (1983), Chao Tien-li (1984), Gan Pui-wan (1995), Pan Lingling (1998), Chen Hong (1998), Doris Lo (2001-2008), Jessey Meng (2006), and Zhang Xinyu (2014-2015).

In contrast to the character's negative portrayals in earlier adaptations of the novel, the 2014 television series The Romance of the Condor Heroes offers a nuanced and comprehensive account of Li Mochou's relationship with Lu Zhanyuan. This interpretation has significantly shifted popular perceptions of Li Mochou, transforming her into a more sympathetic character in the eyes of viewers. This shift has led to a playful phenomenon among viewers and netizens, who humorously dub the series The Biography of Li Mochou instead of its original title.

Li Mochou represents the characteristics of the zodiac constellation Scorpius. She is also a playable character in the 2014 mobile fighting game The Legend of the Condor Heroes.
