= Zhang Xinyu =

Chinese actress

- 张馨予
- Born: Zhang Yan (张燕); March 28, 1987 (age 39); Kunshan, Jiangsu, China
- Other name: Viann Zhang
- Education: Wuxi Institute of Commerce
- Occupations: Actress; Singer; Model
- Years active: 2007–present
- Agent: Zhang Xinyu Studio (under Feibao Media)
- Spouse: He Jie (m. 2018)
- Children: 1

Chinese name
- Traditional Chinese: 張馨予
- Simplified Chinese: 张馨予
Transcriptions
Standard Mandarin
- Hanyu Pinyin: Zhāng Xīnyǔ

Zhang Yan
- Traditional Chinese: 張燕
- Simplified Chinese: 张燕
Transcriptions
Standard Mandarin
- Hanyu Pinyin: Zhāng Yàn

Zhang Xinyu (Chinese: 张馨予, born 28 March 1987), also known as Viann Zhang, is a Chinese actress, singer and model.

== Biography ==
=== Early life ===
Zhang was born and raised in Kunshan, Jiangsu. She graduated from Wuxi institute of Commerce.

=== Acting career ===
Zhang began her career by acting in the historical drama Banner Hero. In 2009, she became the spokeswoman for a national contest of football babes for the 2010 World Cup, and rose to fame in China.

In 2010, Zhang made her film debut in the romance film If You Are the One 2. Some of her notable film roles are in wuxia film Flying Swords of Dragon Gate, and comedy film I Love Hong Kong 2012.

In 2013, Zhang starred in historical drama The Patriot Yue Fei as Liang Hongyu, a Chinese general of the Song dynasty. That same year, she starred in the wuxia television series The Demi-Gods and Semi-Devils, based on the novel by the same name by Jin Yong.

In 2014, Zhang played dual roles as Daji and Hu Xian'er in the television series The Investiture of the Gods, adapted from Xu Zhonglin's classical novel Fengshen Yanyi. Following which, she was nominated at the Huading Awards. She gained increased attention for her role as Li Mochou in The Romance of the Condor Heroes, based on the novel The Return of the Condor Heroes by Jin Yong. Also in 2014, she had roles in the historical drama The Empress of China, playing Consort Xiao; and The Deer and the Cauldron, playing Su Quan.

In 2015, Zhang starred in the action comedy romance film Magic Card. She attended the Cannes Film Festival for the premiere of the film, and received attention for her red carpet fashion.

In 2016, Zhang starred alongside Zhu Yilong in Border Town Prodigal, adapted from the classic novel of the same name by Gu Long.

In 2017, Zhang played the female lead in historical drama Song of Phoenix, which focuses on the legendary life of great Chinese poet Qu Yuan from the Warring States period. The same year, she played the leading role in wuxia drama As Flowers Fade and Fly Across the Sky.

In 2018, Zhang had a supporting role in the historical romance drama Untouchable Lovers, where she played a male role for the first time.

== Personal life ==
Zhang Xinyu married He Jie (Chinese: 何捷; pinyin: Hé jié) on August 27, 2018 in Shanghai. They first met while appearing in a Chinese drama Dog Partner (奇兵神犬). He Jie is an armed police commander in special operations and held the rank of captain.

== Filmography ==
=== Film ===
Year	English title	Chinese title	Role	Notes
2010	If You Are the One 2	非诚勿扰2	Xinyu	
2011	Chase Our Love	宅男总动员:女神归来	Zhao Min	
2011	Starts Good Ends Good	家办喜事	Mo Xiaoyu	
2011	Summer Love Love	夏日恋神马	Xiaoyu	
2011	No Liar, No Cry	不怕贼惦记	Qing Hua	
2011	Flying Swords of Dragon Gate	龙门飞甲	Concubine	
2012	I Love Hong Kong 2012	2012我爱HK喜上加囍	Vivian	
2012	The Unfortunate Car	车在囧途	Yi Rong	
2012	The Lion Roars 2	河东狮吼2	Liu Xiang	
2013	Pink Lady	粉红女郎·爱人快跑	Nanrenpo	
2013	Deadly Flash Play	致命闪玩	Xiao Qing	
2015	Magic Card	魔卡行动	Li Feifei	
2019	Winning Buddha 2	斗战胜佛2		

=== Television series ===
Year	English title	Chinese title	Role	Notes
2007	Banner Hero	大旗英雄传	Princess Feng	
2009	Nonstop	青春进行时	Zhang Zhenni	
2011	Qian Duo Duo Marry Remember	钱多多嫁人记	Jiang Yiyi	
2012	Hunting	猎杀	Gaomei	
2013	The Patriot Yue Fei	精忠岳飞	Liang Hongyu	
2013	Longmen Express	龙门镖局	Yang Siwei	Cameo
2013	Fall in Love	恋爱的那点事儿	Wang Shasha	Cameo
2013	The Distance to Love	到爱的距离	Xu Nan	
2013	The Demi-Gods and Semi-Devils	天龙八部	Kang Min	
2014	The Investiture of the Gods	封神英雄榜	Daji	
2014	The Romance of the Condor Heroes	神雕侠侣	Li Mochou	
2014	The Deer and the Cauldron	鹿鼎记	Su Quan	
2014	The Empress of China	武则天	Consort Xiao	
2015	Singles Villa	只因单身在一起	Lin Manni	
2015	I Am Goddess	青春正能量之我是女神	Gu Jianbai	
2015	Legend of Ban Shu	班淑传奇	Liu Xuan	Guest appearance
2016	Revive	重生之名流巨星	Liu Yi	
2016	Border Town Prodigal	新边城浪子	Ma Fanling	
2016	Demon Girl II	半妖倾城II	Grand Concubine Jin	
2017	Kun Lun Que: Past and Present Life	昆仑阙之前世今生	Ling Xi	
2017	Song of Phoenix	思美人	Mo Chou Nu	
2017	As Flowers Fade and Fly Across the Sky	花谢花飞花满天	Xie Qianxun	
2018	Untouchable Lovers	凤囚凰	Wang Yizhi	
2019	I Will Never Let You Go	小女花不弃	Xue Fei	Cameo
2020	Perfect Partner	完美关系	Pei Yu	Cameo
2020	Love Advanced Customization	爱情高级定制	Qin Qing	
2020	The Glory of Youth	号手就位	Huang Wen	

== Discography ==
Year	English title	Chinese title
2009	Halfway to Fairytale	半路童话

== Awards and nominations ==
Year	Award	Category	Nominated work	Result	Ref.
2020	7th The Actors of China Award Ceremony	Best Actress (Emerald)	—N/a	Pending	
