= Ancient Tomb Sect =

Fictional martial arts sect

- Chinese: 古墓派
Transcriptions
Standard Mandarin
- Hanyu Pinyin: Gǔ Mù Pài
Yue: Cantonese
- Jyutping: Gu^{2} Mou^{6} Paai^{3}

The Ancient Tomb Sect or Ancient Tomb School (古墓派) is a fictional martial arts sect or school in the wuxia novel The Return of the Condor Heroes by Jin Yong. It plays a significant role in the early development of the protagonists, Yang Guo and Xiaolongnü. It was named after an ancient tomb (古墓) in the Zhongnan Mountains where it is based.

== History ==
The sect was founded by Lin Chaoying during the Song dynasty (960–1279) and has a shared history with the Quanzhen Sect, which is based in Chongyang Palace (重陽宮) in the Zhongnan Mountains. The Ancient Tomb was built by Quanzhen's founder Wang Chongyang. Although it was called a tomb, it was actually used to store supplies and weapons in preparation for war against invaders from the Jurchen-led Jin dynasty. The tomb is also filled with various traps and hidden rooms, serving as a hideout for the defenders.

Wang attempted to raise a militia to defend Song territory from the Jin invaders but failed. He was so upset by his failure that he retreated into the tomb to lead a reclusive life, calling himself a "living dead man". As such, the Ancient Tomb is also called the "Tomb of the Living Dead" (活死人墓). Lin, who had romantic feelings for Wang, felt that Wang's talent would go to waste if he continued to be a hermit, so she tricked him into leaving the tomb and both of them roamed the jianghu together. However, Wang was still concerned about protecting Song territory from Jin invasion, so he hardly paid attention to Lin. Lin, thinking that Wang was scorning her, challenged him to a duel in the Zhongnan Mountains. Through trickery, Lin defeated Wang and won the Ancient Tomb as her prize. She settled inside the tomb and had never left since then.

Lin hated Wang for not reciprocating her love for him so she spent her time innovating and developing new martial arts, seemingly to counter the Quanzhen Sect's. Among all the skills she created was the Jade Maiden Heart Sutra, which is the apparently the bane of Quanzhen martial arts. However, it is later discovered that the Jade Maiden Heart Sutra actually complements the Quanzhen Swordplay and covers its flaws.

Lin had a maid, who became her martial arts apprentice. The sect got its name from the Ancient Tomb since Lin did not give it a name and the wulin (martial artists' community) had to refer to it as the "Ancient Tomb Sect". Lin's apprentice, in turn, took Li Mochou and Xiaolongnü as her apprentices. Li, who became a notorious, cold-blooded killer, was expelled from the sect. Xiaolongnü later takes Yang Guo as her apprentice and he becomes the first male member of the sect. In the sequel, The Heaven Sword and Dragon Saber, which takes place around one century after the events of The Return of the Condor Heroes, Yang Guo and Xiaolongnü have a descendant known as the Yellow Dress Maiden, who uses the Jiuyin Zhenjing's skills to defeat Zhou Zhiruo.

== Skills and martial arts ==
=== Jade Maiden Swordplay ===
The Jade Maiden Swordplay (玉女素心劍法) was created by Lin Chaoying, who wrote the instructions to master it in the Jade Maiden Heart Manual (玉女心經). It is the Ancient Tomb Sect's most powerful martial art. Xiaolongnü was taught an incomplete version by her master, who also did not manage to fully learn it.

This style is believed to reflect Lin's grudge against Wang Chongyang, because its moves seem to be designed to attack the weak points of the Quanzhen Swordplay. However, later in the story, Yang Guo and Xiaolongnü discover that the Jade Maiden Swordplay actually complements the Quanzhen Swordplay by covering its weaknesses. This reflects Lin's true feelings; when the two forms of swordplay are executed together by a pair of lovers, it becomes a very powerful movement and the closer the couple are to each other, the more powerful it is. Yang Guo and Xiaolongnü execute this movement together several times and defeat more powerful opponents, including Jinlun Guoshi. However, they became more vulnerable when they are alone. After learning the Skill of Ambidexterity from Zhou Botong, Xiaolongnü is able to use both forms of swordplay with overwhelming speed all by herself.

Yang Guo later writes the Jade Maiden Heart Manual in a book and gives it to Lu Wushuang to help her improve her swordsmanship.

=== Fist of Beauties ===
The Fist of Beauties (美女拳法) is a graceful, elegant and seemingly harmless technique but is actually quite deadly. Its styles and moves are named after notable beauties in Chinese history.

=== Palm of Infinity Web ===
The Palm of Infinity Web (天羅地網式) is a swift defensive technique. It involves moving the palms in a strange pattern and formation, seemingly creating an invisible web, which can confuse an enemy and halt any advances. Yang Guo learns this technique from Xiaolongnü by catching sparrows in mid-flight.

=== Qinggong ===
The Ancient Tomb Sect's qinggong is one of the fastest among all the martial arts sects' in the wulin.
