= China Captain =

2020 film by David S. F. Wilson

- Release poster
- Directed by: He Yizheng
- Written by: He Yizheng
- Screenplay by: He Yizheng
- Starring: Zheng Xiaofu; Li Taiyan; Du Qiao
- Distributed by: Tencent Video
- Release date: May 18, 2020 (China)
- Running time: 60 minutes
- Country: China
- Language: Chinese

China Captain (Chinese: 中国队长; pinyin: Zhōngguó Duìzhǎng) is a 2021 Chinese superhero film released digitally on-demand in China on 18 May 2021 by Tencent Video. Directed and written by He Yizheng, the film features an ensemble cast including Zheng Xiaofu, Li Taiyan, and Du Qiao.

== Plot ==
According to The Straits Times, the film follows a group of Chinese superheroes, including the Monkey King and Zhu Bajie from Journey to the West, Bruce Lee, Jigong, Yang Guo, Justice Bao, and others, as they "declare war on a bunch of foreign superheroes who have encroached on their turf in China."

== Reception ==
The film was released digitally on-demand in China on 18 May 2021 by Tencent Video. Some Chinese netizens criticised the film's many overt similarities with entries in the Marvel Cinematic Universe, while others complained of the poor direction, action sequences, and computer-generated imagery. Nonetheless, according to its official listing on Tencent Video, the film has a score of 7.7. Moreover, China Captain became the top-grossing web film on ticketing platform Maoyan Entertainment.
