= The Olympic Adventures of Fuwa =

Animated television series

- Promotional image of the series
- Chinese: 福娃奧運漫遊記
- Genre: Sports, Comedy
- Country of origin: China
- Original language: Mandarin
- No. of episodes: 100

Original release
- Network: BRTV-KAKU
- Release: 8 August – 1 October 2007

The Olympic Adventures of Fuwa (Chinese: 福娃奧運漫遊記; pinyin: Fúwá Àoyùn Mànyóujì) is a Chinese animated series portraying the 2008 Summer Olympics mascots, known as the Fuwa. The series began running on 8 August 2007. Prior to the television release, Kaku TV distributed copies of the series to foreign embassies and cities.

The series, produced by Kaku TV and China Beijing TV Station, aired on China Beijing TV Station and over 100 other Chinese television channels.

Creators from Mainland China and Hong Kong collaborated to produce the series.

The Asian Animation Comics Contest awarded the series "Best Production" in September 2007.

== Cast ==
Characters	Mandarin dub	Cantonese dub	Japanese dub	English dub	Latin American Spanish dub	Description
Beibei	Tao Hong	Cenlia Lam		Catherine Fu	Rossy Aguirre	A character with a hat patterned after the Chinese sturgeon
Jingjing	Mei Ting	Joyce Luk		Catherine Fu	Erica Edwards	A panda with bamboo leaves on his head
Huanhuan	Jin Haixin	Judy Cheung		Lily Truncale	Rossy Aguirre	A character with a flame-patterned hat
Yingying	Jane Zhang	Kate Cheng		Muriel Hofmann	Gisela Casillas	A Tibetan antelope
Nini	Cao Ying	Louise Ho		Muriel Hofmann	Melissa Gedeon	A character wearing a swallow-patterned hat
Bengbeng	Pan Yueming	Lee Kam Lun		Russell Wait	Dafnis Fernandez	A caterpillar-like creature, older brother of Tiaotiao
Tiaotiao	Gong Ge'er	Leung Wai Tak		Jack Murphy	Andrea Orozco	A caterpillar-like creature, younger brother of Bengbeng
Quan Boshi	Lu Jianyi	Chan Wing Shun		Russell Wait	Jesús Ochoa	A character with trumpetlike ears, mouth and arms who is also a scientist
Xiao Fei	Zeng Weijing	Sharon Leung		Muriel Hofmann	Humberto Vélez	An alien resembling a pterosaur
Mini	Zhang Zhen	Tsang Sau Ching		Catherine Fu	Patricia Acevedo	A butterfly fairy
Mum	Zhang Zhen	Wong Yuk Kuen			Mayrín Villanueva	
Dad	Zhang Guoli	Chiu Sai Leung			David Zepeda	

== Episodes ==
- 01 "Fuwa Has Stupidly Arrived"
- 02 "The Mysterious Starting Blocks"
- 03 "Sprint Crazy"
- 04 "The Special Champion"
- 05 "The Unexpected Origin"
- 06 "The Statue with a Title"
- 07 "Boxing World"
- 08 "Freedom is the Fastest"
- 09 "Target Shooting"
- 10 "The Beach and the Volleyball"
- 11 "Waterlilies"
- 12 "More Styles of Swimming"
- 13 "Sword Skills"
- 14 "Tennis is Fun"
- 15 "Bicycle Kingdom"
- 16 "The Borrowed Champion"
- 17 "The Secret of the Bow and Arrow"
- 18 "Archery Heroes"
- 19 "Which is the Fastest Ball?"
- 20 "High Jumping Without Limits"
- 21 "Run Greeks Run!"
- 22 "The Strange Series of a Competition"
- 23 "Missing Marathon Man"
- 24 "The Queen and the Fast Runner"
- 25 "Childhood Inspiration"
- 26 "Snow Per Hour"
- 27 "Shaving Heads After a Lost"
- 28 "The Unlikely Horse"
- 29 "Dancing in the Air"
- 30 "Secrets of Ice Hockeys"
- 31 "Child's Game"
- 32 "Flying Trapeze"
- 33 "0.1 Central - Winning Away"
- 34 "The First Sword"
- 35 "Ice Ballet"
- 36 "The Different Medal"
- 37 "Failure is the Mother of Success"
- 38 "Shot of the Evolution"
- 39 "The Frog is My Teacher"
- 40 "The Sport That is Cool and Refreshing"
- 41 "Multi-Platform Synchronized Diving"
- 42 "Beach-goers"
- 43 "Secrets of the Swimsuit"
- 44 "Snowy Battlefields"
- 45 "Overcoming Obstacles"
- 46 "The Price of Excitement"
- 47 "Step by Step to Becoming the Champion"
- 48 "The General Feeling of Flying"
- 49 "Absolute Balance"
- 50 "Hercules of War"
- 51 "Guess About the Olympics"
- 52 "Immortal Flame"
- 53 "The Boxer on the Sled"
- 54 "The Birth of Football"
- 55 "The Star of the Pitch"
- 56 "The Professor's Game"
- 57 "The Dream Team"
- 58 "Handballing with No Fouls"
- 59 "Hockey in the Tang Dynasty"
- 60 "The Unexpected Competition"
- 61 "Table Tennis"
- 62 "Ping-Pong in China"
- 63 "Flying Over the Basketball Net"
- 64 "The Female Superstar of Volleyball"
- 65 "Champion Mom"
- 66 "A Good Horse's Race"
- 67 "The Super Warrior's Song"
- 68 "The Fuwa vs. the Professor"
- 69 "The Prince of Gymnastics"
- 70 "Steel Wires and Horizontal Bars"
- 71 "Tricks on the Parallel Bars"
- 72 "Ups and Downs"
- 73 "Swings and Rings"
- 74 "The Somersaulting Sport"
- 75 "The Gold Medal Within the Gold Medal"
- 76 "Pole Vaulting"
- 77 "Heavy Mali ELE surur eya ala a hra a o do o you di mie"
- 78 "The Champion Across the Towel"
- 79 "Who is the Strongest?"
- 80 "Wrestling"
- 81 "The Road to Judo"
- 82 "The Technique"
- 83 "Taekwondo Training Class"
- 84 "This is How to Make Steel"
- 85 "Water Heroes"
- 86 "In the Rush"
- 87 "The Champion Without a Name"
- 88 "Victorious"
- 89 "Uncharted Waters"
- 90 "Zonda"
- 91 "18 Martial Arts"
- 92 "Chinese Kung Fu"
- 93 "China's Pride"
- 94 "The Chapter of Brilliance"
- 95 "Iron Champion"
- 96 "Running with Tennis"
- 97 "There's a Judo Master in the Massage Room"
- 98 "The Circle of Smiles"
- 99 "Half Gold Half Silver"
- 100 "Beijing Welcomes You"
