= The Return of the Condor Heroes (1976 TV series) =

1976 Hong Kong TV series

- Black-and-white photo of Law Lok-lam and Lee Tong-ming posing as the main characters in the series
- 神鵰俠侶
- Genre: Wuxia
- Based on: The Return of the Condor Heroes by Jin Yong
- Starring: Law Lok-lam; Lee Tong-ming
- Country of origin: Hong Kong
- Original language: Cantonese
- No. of episodes: 59

Production
- Producer: Siu Sang
- Production location: Hong Kong
- Running time: ≈45 minutes per episode
- Production companies: CTV; Shaw Brothers Studio

Original release
- Network: CTV
- Release: 1976 – 1976

Related
- The Legend of the Condor Heroes (1976)

The Return of the Condor Heroes (神鵰俠侶) is a Hong Kong wuxia television series adapted from the novel of the same title by Jin Yong. It was first broadcast on CTV in 1976 in Hong Kong.

== Cast ==
- Law Lok-lam as Yang Guo
  - Tsui Ka-lam as Yang Guo (child)
- Lee Tong-ming as Xiaolongnü
- Jason Pai as Guo Jing
- Michelle Yim as Huang Rong
- Lam Hau-yee as Guo Fu
- Lam Yan-yan as Guo Xiang
- Cheung Man-ting as Li Mochou
- Michael Chan as Huang Yaoshi
- Chan Fei-lung as Hong Qigong
- Yeung Chak-lam as Ouyang Feng
- Chung Chi-keung as Yideng
- Chun Wong as Zhou Botong
- Cheng Lui as Jinlun Fawang
- Ng Ming-choi as Da'erba
- Wu Yan-yan as Cheng Ying
- Tam Yan-may as Lu Wushuang
- Carol Cheng as Gongsun Lü'e
- Bruce Leung as Yelü Qi
- Chan Yiu-lam as Yin Zhiping
- Kenneth Tsang as Zhao Zhijing
- Cho Tat-wah as Gongsun Zhi
- Hon Kwok-choi as Qiu Qianchi / Granny Sun / Qiu Qianren
- Mak Tin-yan as Qiu Chuji
- Ba San as Wang Chuyi
- Lau Kong as Hao Datong
- Pau Hon-lam as Wang Chongyang
- Ding Ying as Lin Chaoying
- Chan Yuk-wai as Yelü Yan
- Lai See-man as Wanyan Ping
- Paul Chun as Wu Santong
- Ching See-chun as Wu Xiuwen
- Wong Sik-kwong as Wu Dunru
- Fong Kit as Yelü Chucai
- Wan Chuen as Ke Zhen'e
- Stanley Fung as Lu Liding
- Cheung Hung-cheung as Lu Guanying
- Ho Siu-hung as Yinkexi
- Chan Chi-leung as Xiaoxiangzi
- Lee Chuen-sing as Ma Guangzuo
- Tong Kam-tong as Nimoxing
- Stanley Fung as Lu Zhanyuan
- Bonnie Ngai as He Yuanjun / Qiu Qianchi (younger)
- Yeung Hok-nin as Feng Mofeng
- Tong Tik as Fan Yiweng
