= List of The Return of the Condor Heroes characters =

List of characters from the novel The Return of the Condor Heroes by Jin Yong

The following is a list of characters from the wuxia novel The Return of the Condor Heroes by Jin Yong. Some of these characters are fictionalised personas of, or are based on, actual historical figures, such as Wang Chongyang, Qiu Chuji, Duan Zhixing, Kublai Khan, and Yelü Chucai.

== Main characters ==
- Yang Guo (楊過)
- Xiaolongnü (小龍女)

== The Condor ==
The Divine Condor (神鵰) is a giant eagle-like creature living alone in a valley and a former companion of the swordsman Dugu Qiubai. After roaming the land for years and failing to find someone who can rival him in swordsmanship, Dugu Qiubai came to a cave near a forest and spent the rest of his life there as a hermit. Several years after his death, the Condor encounters Yang Guo by coincidence while he was fighting with a giant serpent. Yang Guo learns Dugu Qiubai's swordsmanship from the Condor. As he has lost his right arm, Yang Guo trains relentlessly and overcomes his disability to use Dugu Qiubai's Heavy Iron Sword with only one arm. After accomplishing a high level of proficiency in swordsmanship, Yang Guo ventures out with the Condor to search for Xiaolongnü and reunite with her.

== Guo family and associates ==
- Guo Jing (郭靖)
- Huang Rong (黃蓉)
- Guo Fu (郭芙) is Guo Jing and Huang Rong's elder daughter. Even though she is gorgeous, she is spoiled and insolent and has been rather unfriendly towards Yang Guo since they were young. At one point, she gets into a heated quarrel with Yang Guo while confronting him about how he lied to the Wu brothers that her parents have agreed to let him marry her, and ends up cutting off his right arm with a sword. She marries Yelü Qi and, after realizing that her true feelings for Yang Guo and jealousy towards Xiaolongnü in the past, reconciles with them in the end.
- Guo Xiang (郭襄) is Guo Jing and Huang Rong's younger daughter. When she was a newborn baby, she was abducted by Li Mochou but was saved by Yang Guo, whom she has a crush on when she grows up. She is nicknamed "Little Eastern Heretic" (小東邪) after her maternal grandfather, "Eastern Heretic" Huang Yaoshi. In her middle age, she becomes a Buddhist nun and establishes the Emei Sect.
- Guo Polu (郭破虜) is Guo Xiang's twin brother. In The Heaven Sword and Dragon Saber, it is revealed that 14 years after the events of The Return of the Condor Heroes, he died along with his parents during the Battle of Xiangyang.
- Wu Dunru (武敦儒) and Wu Xiuwen (武修文) are Wu Santong's sons. After their mother died, their father became insane and went missing for years. The boys were then raised by Guo Jing and Huang Rong, who also taught them martial arts. Both of them have a crush on Guo Fu and, at one point, nearly fight each other to the death to win her love. However, Yang Guo resolves their dispute by lying that Guo Fu's parents have agreed to let him marry her. The Wu brothers believe Yang Guo and give up on Guo Fu; they eventually marry Yelü Yan and Wanyan Ping respectively, and are said to be expecting children with their wives near the end of the novel.
- Yelü Qi (耶律齊) is Yelü Chucai's son and Zhou Botong's secret apprentice. He marries Guo Fu and succeeds Lu Youjiao as the chief of the Beggar Clan.
- Yelü Yan (耶律燕) is Yelü Qi's younger sister who marries Wu Dunru.
- Wanyan Ping (完顏萍) is a surviving member of the royal family of the former Jin Empire. Her parents died when the Jin Empire was conquered by the Mongols, and she swears vengeance on Yelü Chucai, whom she blames for her losses. She fails to assassinate him and loses to his children in a fight. She eventually reconciles with the Yelüs and marries Wu Xiuwen.

== Mongol Empire ==
- Jinlun Guoshi (金輪國師; literally "Golden Wheel Royal Adviser") is one of the antagonists in the novel. Originally a Tibetan lama, he serves the Mongols and represents them in challenging the wulin. He is defeated by Yang Guo during the Battle of Xiangyang and dies while saving Guo Xiang from being burnt alive. The "Golden Wheel" refers to his weapon, which resembles a gold-coloured chakram. Despite his evil nature, he is shown to be gentle towards Guo Xiang, whom he favours because of her intelligence, and has been considering taking her as his fourth apprentice.
- Huodu (霍都) is a Mongol nobleman descended from Jamukha, and Jinlun's third apprentice who wields a hand fan in combat. He is infatuated with Xiaolongnü and proposes to her but gets rejected immediately. A cunning and witty person, he is not very loyal to his master. When Jinlun, Huodu and Da'erba are fighting with Yang Guo, Huodu realises that they are losing so he abandons his master and flees. Later, he disguises himself as a beggar, He Shiwo (何師我), murders Lu Youjiao, and tries to become the chief of the Beggar Clan. Yang Guo exposes his identity and leads Daerba to him. Daerba defeats him for betraying their master.
- Daerba (達爾巴) is a Tibetan monk and Jinlun's second apprentice. In contrast with Huodu, he is honest and loyal towards his master even though he is slow-witted. Having been outsmarted by Yang Guo at one point, he has since believed that Yang Guo was Jinlun's deceased first apprentice in his past life. When Jinlun, Huodou, and Daerba are fighting with Yang Guo, Huodu abandons his master and flees while Daerba tries his best to protect his master's life. Yang Guo realizes that he is truly a good person, so he spares his life. 16 years later, he helps Yang Guo eliminate Huodu. After that, to repay Yang Guo for sparing his life, he promises to return home and never leave Tibet again.
- Möngke (蒙哥) is the Great Khan of the Mongol Empire and the eldest son of Guo Jing's deceased anda Tolui. He personally leads his army to attack Xiangyang and is slain by Yang Guo in the final battle.
- Kublai (忽必烈) a Mongol prince and the younger brother of Möngke. When Guo Jing meets him, he notices that Kublai bears a striking resemblance to his father, Tolui. This similitude causes intense emotional conflict for Guo Jing, as he must now treat the sons of his late sworn brother as enemies. After leading the Mongol assault on Xiangyang, Kublai navigated more than a decade of succession wars triggered by Möngke's death. He ultimately claimed the title of Great Khan and founded the Yuan dynasty, consolidating his rule over China, Manchuria, and the eastern Mongolian Plateau.
- Yelü Chucai (耶律楚才) is the premier of the Mongol Empire and a descendant of the royal family of the former Liao Empire.
- Yelü Jin (耶律晉) is Yelü Chucai's elder son.

=== Mercenaries hired by the Mongols ===
- Xiaoxiangzi (瀟湘子) is a martial artist from Xiangxi. Along with Yinkexi, he steals the Jiuyang Zhenjing from the Shaolin Sect and hides it in the stomach of a white gorilla. After that, they grow suspicious of each other and kill each other.
- Yinkexi (尹克西) is a merchant and martial artist from Persia.
- Nimoxing (尼摩星) is a martial artist from India. He has his legs amputated after falling into a trap set by Yang Guo using Li Mochou's poison needles. He is slain by Yang Guo in Xiangyang 16 years later.
- Ma Guangzuo (麻光佐) is a martial artist from Xinjiang. Unlike the other mercenaries, he has helped Yang Guo and Xiaolongnü before. Yang Guo later persuades him to leave the Mongols.

== Passionless Valley ==
- Gongsun Zhi (公孫止) is the master of Passionless Valley (絕情谷). Although he appears extraordinary, noble and gentlemanly, he is in fact cold-hearted, ruthless and lecherous. A highly-skilled martial artist, he wields a pair of blades in combat. After he first meets Xiaolongnü, he tries to make her marry him until Yang Guo shows up and stops him. His true colours are revealed as the story progresses, particularly after his wife returns to seek vengeance on him. He flees the valley after he is blinded in one eye, but returns later to take revenge on his wife and dies together with her when they both fall off a cliff.
- Qiu Qianchi (裘千尺) is Qiu Qianren's younger sister and Gongsun Zhi's wife. An insolent and domineering woman, she gradually fell out of her husband's favour and he decided to get rid of her. After drugging her, he broke her limbs and threw her into an underground pit and left her for dead. While struggling to survive, she mastered a skill which allowed her to overcome her disability by using her neigong to suck distant objects into her mouth and fire them as projectiles towards enemies with extreme force and accuracy. Several years later, Yang Guo encounters her by chance and brings her back to confront Gongsun Zhi, revealing his dark past and true nature. She ultimately falls to her death off a cliff along with her husband.
- Gongsun Lü'e (公孫綠萼) is Gongsun Zhi and Qiu Qianchi's daughter. Unlike her parents, she is kind-hearted and compassionate. She has a crush on Yang Guo and eventually sacrifices herself to help him.
- Fan Yiweng (樊一翁) is Gongsun Zhi's most senior apprentice. He has a long white beard and becomes the "Long Bearded Ghost" later.
- Rou'er (柔兒) was a servant girl whom Gongsun Zhi fell in love with. Qiu Qianchi discovered their illicit relationship and forced her husband to kill Rou'er.

== Ancient Tomb Sect ==
- Lin Chaoying (林朝英) was the sect's founder. She was both a rival and lover of Wang Chongyang, and equalled him in fighting prowess.
- Li Mochou (李莫愁), nicknamed "Red Fairy" (赤練仙子), is Xiaolongnü's senior who was expelled from the sect. She attempts to seize the Jade Maiden Heart Sutra from Xiaolongnü and Yang Guo on several occasions but never succeeds.
- Granny Sun (孫婆婆) is an elderly woman who lives with Xiaolongnü in the Ancient Tomb. She saves Yang Guo from the bullies at the Quanzhen Sect and wants to help him fend them off. She is accidentally killed by Hao Datong during the scuffle. Before her death, she makes Xiaolongnü promise her to take care of Yang Guo.
- Hong Lingbo (洪凌波) is Li Mochou's apprentice. She is rather sympathetic to Lu Wushuang, who was Li's slave then. She is used as a cushion by her master to escape from the love flowers and dies after being pricked by the poisonous flowers.

== Lu family ==
- Cheng Ying (程英) is Lu Wushuang's cousin. After Lu Wushuang's family was murdered by Li Mochou, Cheng Ying was saved by Huang Yaoshi, who took her as his apprentice. Later, she meets Yang Guo and has a crush on him, but ultimately becomes his sworn sister.
- Lu Wushuang (陸無雙) is Lu Liding's daughter and Cheng Ying's cousin. When she was still a child, her family were murdered by Li Mochou, who abducted and enslaved her for years. She manages to escape later and encounters Yang Guo, whom she develops a crush on. She ultimately becomes Yang Guo's sworn sister.
- Lu Zhanyuan (陸展元) was Li Mochou's former lover who had died three years before the events of the novel take place. He had reneged his promise to marry Li Mochou and married He Yuanjun instead. This led to Li Mochou holding a grudge against the Lu family, whom she massacres at the start of the novel.
- He Yuanjun (何沅君) was Lu Zhanyuan's wife who committed suicide to join her husband after he died of illness.
- Lu Liding (陸立鼎) is Lu Zhanyuan's younger brother. Except for his daughter Lu Wushuang, the entire Lu family was brutally murdered by Li Mochou at the start of the novel.

== Quanzhen Sect ==
- Wang Chongyang (王重陽), nicknamed "Central Divine" (中神通), was the founder of the Quanzhen Sect. Regarded as the most powerful martial artist in the wulin in his time, he was the first among the five winners of the martial arts contest on Mount Hua and had won the Jiuyin Zhenjing as his prize.
- Zhou Botong (周伯通), nicknamed "Old Imp" (老頑童) for his childish behaviour despite his old age, is Wang Chongyang's junior and a formidable martial artist. Towards the end of the novel, he becomes the first among the new five winners of the martial arts contest on Mount Hua and replaces Wang Chongyang in the central position as the "Central Imp" (中頑童).
- The "Seven Immortals of Quanzhen" (全真七子) are Wang Chongyang's seven apprentices who lead the Quanzhen Sect after their master's death. One of them, Tan Chuduan (譚處端), was killed by Ouyang Feng in the first novel.
  - Ma Yu (馬鈺), also known as Danyangzi (丹陽子)
  - Liu Chuxuan (劉處玄), also known as Changshengzi (長生子)
  - Qiu Chuji (丘處機), also known as Changchunzi (長春子)
  - Wang Chuyi (王處一), also known as Yuyangzi (玉陽子)
  - Hao Datong (郝大通), also known as Guangningzi (廣寧子)
  - Sun Bu'er (孫不二), also known as Qingjing Sanren (清靜散人)
- Zhao Zhijing (趙志敬) is the most senior of all Quanzhen members after the "Seven Immortals". He was Yang Guo's master when Yang Guo was in Quanzhen. He dislikes the boy, does not teach him any practical martial arts, and allows his other apprentices to bully him. Later in the novel, he collaborates with the Mongols to seize the leadership position of his sect, but his plans are foiled and he is killed by Xiaolongnü's jade bees.
- Zhen Zhibing (甄志丙) is a senior member of Quanzhen. He has a crush on Xiaolongnü and is unable to restrain himself so he blindfolds and rapes Xiaolongnü when she is immobilised by Ouyang Feng. Xiaolongnü is unaware that Zhen Zhibing was the one who raped her and she wrongly accused Yang Guo until the truth is revealed. When the truth comes to light, Zhen Zhibing, who has been deeply plagued by guilt for years over this incident, begs Xiaolongnü to kill him but she cannot bring herself to. He later sacrifices himself to save Xiaolongnü from death as atonement for his sins.
- Lu Qingdu (鹿清篤) is one of Zhao Zhijing's apprentices. Like his master, he hates Yang Guo and takes pleasure in bullying the boy during his time in Quanzhen. At one point, Yang Guo uses the Toad Skill to knock out Lu Qingdu, flees from Quanzhen and eventually joins the Ancient Tomb Sect. When the Mongols show up at Quanzhen later, Lu Qingdu joins Zhao Zhijing in pledging allegiance to the Mongol Empire, and kills some Quanzhen members who refuse to serve the Mongols. After Zhao Zhijing meets his end, Lu Qingdu and the Quanzhen traitors are executed for their betrayal.

== Dali Kingdom ==
- Reverend Yideng (一燈大師), previously known as Duan Zhixing (段智興) and nicknamed "Southern Emperor" (南帝), is the former ruler of the Dali Kingdom and one of the five winners of the martial arts contest on Mount Hua. He has since abdicated and become a Buddhist monk. Towards the end of the novel, he retains his position among the new five winners of the martial arts contest on Mount Hua as the "Southern Monk" (南僧).
- Liu Ying (劉瑛), also known as Yinggu (瑛姑) and nicknamed "Divine Mathematician" (神算子), was originally Duan Zhixing's concubine when he was still the emperor of Dali. She had a secret affair with Zhou Botong and bore him a son, but their son died at the hands of Qiu Qianren. After her son's death, she leads a reclusive life in the Black Swamp with only a pair of Nine Tailed Divine Foxes to keep her company.
- Yideng's close aides:
  - Chu Dongshan (褚東山), nicknamed "Reclusive Fisherman of Diancang" (點蒼漁隱).
  - Zhang Shaoshou (張少守)
  - Wu Santong (武三通) is the father of the Wu brothers. He went insane and disappeared when his wife sacrificed herself to save him after he was poisoned by Li Mochou. He only appears again several years later when his boys have grown up.
  - Zhu Ziliu (朱子柳) participates in the martial arts contest at Dasheng Pass, and later appears to help the protagonists in defending Xiangyang from the Mongols.
- Wu Sanniang (武三娘) was Wu Santong's wife and the mother of the Wu brothers. Her husband was injured and poisoned by Li Mochou, and she saved his life by sucking out the venom from his wound. However, she died from poisoning and Wu Santong was so traumatised that he went berserk and disappeared for many years, only to return when his sons have grown up.

== Peach Blossom Island ==
- Huang Yaoshi (黃藥師), nicknamed "Eastern Heretic" (東邪), is the master of Peach Blossom Island and one of the five winners of the martial arts contest on Mount Hua. Towards the end of the novel, he retains his position among the new five winners of the martial arts contest on Mount Hua.
- Ke Zhen'e (柯鎮惡) is the sole surviving member of the "Seven Freaks of Jiangnan" from the first novel. He lives with the Guos and is respected as an elder in the family. Despite holding a grudge against Yang Guo's father for the deaths of his fellows, he treats the boy like the rest of the Guo children after sensing that Yang is not corrupt. Years later, he relates the story of Yang Kang to Yang Guo at the Temple of the Iron Spear. He admires Yang Guo for his chivalry, and is also grateful to Yang for saving his life from Sha Tongtian and company. He forgives Yang Guo's father and promises to help Yang reconstruct his father's tomb.
- Shagu (傻姑) is the orphaned daughter of Qu Lingfeng from the first novel. Huang Yaoshi took her under his care and trained her as his apprentice. Upon learning that she was present at the scene of his father's death, Yang Guo attempts to force her to tell him the details about the incident. However, her ambiguous and unclear answers cause him to mistakenly believe that Guo Jing and Huang Rong murdered his father.
- Feng Mofeng (馮默風) is a former apprentice of Huang Yaoshi and the sole survivor among Huang's original six apprentices (the others were either killed or died of natural causes). He was maimed and banished from Peach Blossom Island by his master when his seniors, Chen Xuanfeng and Mei Chaofeng, betrayed their master. He becomes a blacksmith after leaving the island and he still respects Huang Yaoshi. He sacrifices himself to buy time for Guo Jing and Yang Guo to escape from the Mongol camp.

== Shaolin Sect ==
- Jueyuan (覺遠) is the librarian of Shaolin. Although he had not been formally allowed to train in Shaolin martial arts, he secretly built up immense neigong after learning from the Jiuyang Zhenjing.
- Zhang Junbao (張君寶) is Jueyuan's apprentice who memorises part of the Jiuyang Zhenjing from his master. Towards the end of the novel, he and his master are chasing Xiaoxiangzi and Yinkexi, who have stolen the Jiuyang Zhenjing from the Shaolin library. They encounter Yang Guo, who help them defeat the two mercenaries.
- Tianming (天鳴) is the abbot of Shaolin.
- Wuse (無色) is the head of the Arhat Hall.
- Wuxiang (無相) is the head of the Bodhidharma Hall.

== Guo Xiang's friends ==
- The "Ghosts of the Western Mountain Cave" (西山一窟鬼) are a group of martial artists who dress up as phantoms and ghosts to scare people. They befriend Guo Xiang and become allies of her and Yang Guo.
- Shi Bowei (史伯威), Shi Zhongmeng (史仲猛), Shi Shugang (史叔剛), Shi Jiqiang (史季強), and Shi Mengjie (史孟捷) are five brothers known for their abilities to tame all kinds of wild beasts. They befriend Guo Xiang and become Yang Guo's allies.
- Zhang Yimang (張一氓)
- Abbess Shengyin (聖因師太)
- Human Cook (人廚子)
- Hundred Herbs Fairy (百草仙)

== Others ==
- Qiu Qianren (裘千仞) was the chief of the Iron Palm Clan (鐵掌幫) who was nicknamed "Iron Palm Skimming on Water" (鐵掌水上飄) for his prowess in martial arts and qinggong. Notorious for committing heinous crimes in the past, he was saved from death by Yideng and has since repented, become Yideng's apprentice and renamed himself Ci'en (慈恩). He dies in peace after Zhou Botong and Yinggu forgive him for killing their infant son.
- Lu Youjiao (魯有腳) is the Beggar Clan's chief and Huang Rong's successor. Slow-witted but honest and loyal, he is lured into a trap and slain by Huodu, who takes the Dog Beating Staff from him.
- Lu Guanying (陸冠英) is the son of Lu Chengfeng, one of Huang Yaoshi's original six apprentices. He becomes the leader of the pirates of Lake Tai after his father's death. He plays host to the Heroes' Feast at Dasheng Pass.
- Cheng Yaojia (程瑤迦) is Sun Bu'er's apprentice and Lu Guanying's wife.
- Sha Tongtian (沙通天), Hou Tonghai (侯通海), Lingzhi Shangren (靈智上人), and Peng Lianhu (彭連虎) are four minor villains in the first novel. They were defeated on Mount Hua and captured by Zhou Botong and imprisoned in the Quanzhen Sect. Despite attempts to reform them, the four tried to escape a few times but failed. Ultimately, after one failed escape attempt, the four were crippled and three were blinded. They manage to escape later when the Mongols attacked the Quanzhen Sect. After living a peaceful life for 16 years, they encounter Ke Zhen'e in Jiaxing, and attempt to kill him out of fear that he would reveal their whereabouts. Yang Guo comes to Ke's aid and defeats them in a brief fight. They later relate the story of Yang Kang to Yang Guo.
- Lü Wende (呂文德) is the commander of Xiangyang's military forces. He dies ten years after the events of the novel.
- Lü Wenhuan (呂文煥) is Lü Wende's brother who takes over his brother's command of Xiangyang's military forces.
