= Doris Lo =

Hong Kong voice actor

- Born: July 20, 1952
- Died: July 22, 2006 (aged 54)
- Occupation: Voice actress

Doris Lo (Chinese: 盧素娟, Pinyin: Lú Sùjuān; 20 July 1952 – 22 July 2006) was a Hong Kong voice actress who was best known for voicing the character Nobita Nobi for the Hong Kong version of the anime along with Lam Pou-chuen who voices the character Doraemon.

Lo died at the age of 54 from colorectal cancer at Shatin Hospital in Hong Kong.

== Filmography ==
=== Anime Roles ===
- Cardcaptor Sakura - Eriol Hiiragizawa
- Detective Conan - Conan Edogawa
- Doraemon - Nobita Nobi
- Heidi, Girl of the Alps - Heidi
- Kyorochan - Kyorochan
- The Legend of Condor Hero - Li Mochou
- Moomin - Moomintroll
- Queen Emeraldas - Emeraldas
- Pokémon - Ash Ketchum
- Princess Tutu - Uzura
- Sailor Moon - Rei Hino (Sailor Mars)
- You're Under Arrest - Futaba Aoi

=== Film ===
- Alien - Ellen Ripley played by Sigourney Weaver
- Anna and the King - Anna Leonowens played by Jodie Foster
- A Better Tomorrow - Jackie played by Emily Chu
- Mission: Impossible - Sarah Davies played by Kristin Scott Thomas
- Police Story - Salina Fong played by Brigitte Lin

=== Drama (Chinese) ===
- The Eloquent Ji Xiaolan - Mo Chou played by Cynthia Khan
- Romance in the Rain - Fu Wenpei played by Xu Xing
- Towards the Republic - Empress Dowager Cixi played by Lü Zhong

=== Drama (Japanese) ===
- Attack No. 1 - Ryoko Ayuhara played by Kumiko Okae
- Ōoku - Takiyama played by Yūko Asano

=== Drama (Korean) ===
- Empress Myeongseong - Lady Yi of Gamgodang played by Sunwoo Eun-sook
- Hur Jun - Mrs. Son played by Jung Hye-sun
