= The Legend of Condor Hero =

2001–2008 Japanese-Hong Kong anime series

- Screenshot

神鵰侠侶 コンドルヒーロー (Shin Chō Kyō Ryō: Kondoru Hīro)
- Genre: Wuxia; Romance
- Anime television series
- Directed by: Jun Takagi; Masami Anno
- Produced by: Hitoshi Nakajima; Matsumi Tanaka
- Written by: Jin Yong
- Studio: Nippon Animation; Jade Animation
- Original network: BS Fuji
- Original run: October 11, 2001 – May 3, 2008
- Episodes: 78

The Legend of Condor Hero
- Title screen
- Chinese: 神雕侠侣
Transcriptions

The Legend of Condor Hero (神鵰俠侶 コンドルヒーロー, Shin Chō Kyō Ryō: Kondoru Hīro) is a Japanese–Hong Kong anime series adapted from the wuxia novel The Return of the Condor Heroes by Jin Yong. Co-produced by Nippon Animation and Jade Animation, the series was shown on BS Fuji from October 11, 2001, to May 3, 2008.

== Synopsis ==
The Legend of Condor Hero is set in the 13th century around the Mongol conquest of China. Nearly a decade after the end of The Legend of the Condor Heroes, the Mongols have conquered the Jin dynasty in northern China and are now setting their sights on the Song dynasty in the south. The Song citizens, many of whom are formidable martial artists in the jianghu, band together to defend their homeland from the impending Mongol invasion. The story culminates in the historical Battle of Xiangyang.

The story follows a young martial artist Yang Guo (Youka), who falls in love with his martial arts master, Xiaolongnü (Shouryuujo), and the trials and tribulations they go through in war-torn China.

== List of episodes ==
There are 78 episodes released of The Legend of Condor Hero. Season I is composed of two parts—episodes 1–12 and episodes 13–26. Season II takes after the end of Season I, starting from episode 27 to 52. Season III broadcast began in Taiwan and Canada in 2008.

The Japanese version was only made for the first series.

In all three series, Taiseng released the respective DVDs months before respective television broadcasts.

Season I (神鵰俠侶 I：古墓奇緣)
Episode #	Title
1	Trouble at the Temple (義弟之子)
2	The Toad Stance (蛤蟆神功)
3	The Dragon of Ancient Tomb (活死人墓)
4	Fulfilling the Promise (古墓門下)
5	Lin Chaoying's Sutra (玉女心經)
6	The Serpent Deity (斷龍石)
7	Love Thy Enemy (重陽遺書)
8	A Taoist Loses His Soul (誤解)
9	Fair, Beautiful Lady (追尋夢幻)
10	Secret Ally (復仇)
11	The Past Catches Up (痛苦回憶)
12	Winter on Mount Hua (雪山怪人)
13	The Last Great Fight (武林二老歸天)
14	Heroes' Summon (英雄大會)
15	The Head of Wulin (武林盟主)
16	A Love Forbidden (禁忌之愛)
17	Sayonara (被拆散的戀人)
18	By the Stone Ruins (追憶身影)
19	Announcement of Death (火焰狂宴)
20	An Empty Tomb (命運之線)
21	Hidden Fortress (絕情谷的新娘)
22	Love Me Not (情花地獄)
23	The Dark Abyss (地獄谷底)
24	A Woman Scorned (地底秘密)
25	The Wedding and the Reckoning (染血婚禮)
26	The Beginning (隨風而去)

Season II (神鵰俠侶 II：襄陽風雲)
Episode #	Title
27	Exacting Vengeance (父仇)
28	Bloodshed in Xiangyang (血染襄陽)
29	Murderous Intentions (俠中之俠)
30	Fight Till the End (捨身一戰)
31	Deep into Enemy Camp (深入虎穴)
32	Sublimation from Vengeance (超越恩仇)
33	When Life Comes to an End (生命終結之際)
34	Born in the Fire (戰火之子)
35	The Nightmare Reappears (惡夢重現)
36	The Condor Valley (神鵰谷)
37	A Duel at Dawn (黎明的決鬥)
38	Gloomy Xiaolongnü (憂傷的小龍女)
39	Fate Take Its Toll (命運多劫)
40	Seriously Wounded (身負重創)
41	Tomb of Swords (不説話的師父)
42	Condor's Sword (神鵰重劍)
43	A Distant Dream (遙遠的夢想)
44	A Duel Between Two Ladies (女傑決鬥)
45	Tragedy on Mount Zhongnan (終南山烏雲)
46	A Bloody Farewell (血色的再會)
47	Honeymoon (洞房花燭)
48	The Secret of the Chilling Jade Bed (寒玉牀的秘密)
49	Hope (希望)
50	A Crisis Approaches (危機逼近)
51	A Destined Calamity (劫難重重)
52	An Unexpected Encounter in the Snow (雪中邂逅)

Season III (神鵰俠侶 III：相約十六年)
Episode #	Title
53	Walking Towards an Unlucky Ground (走向不吉之地)
54	Yang Guo in Love (楊過戀愛)
55	Rescue Guo Xiang (奪回郭襄)
56	Bitter Love (苦戀)
57	Pitiful Lü'e (悲慘的綠萼)
58	The Mountain of Offering Condolences (弔喪之山)
59	Divine Nun of the Southern Sea (南海神尼)
60	Drifting Away (飄流四方)
61	Snowy Night (雪夜)
62	The Nine Tailed Fox (九尾靈狐)
63	Vision of the Hero (憧憬的英雄)
64	Heilongtan old Lady (黑龍潭老婆婆)
65	Fading Days (已逝去的日子)
66	Golden Needle Agreement (金針的約定)
67	Mysterious Saviour (神秘救星)
68	Evening before the Storm (暴風雨前夕)
69	Exposure Conspiracy (陰謀暴露)
70	The Lie of Sixteen Years Ago (十六年前的謊言)
71	Guo Xiang Kidnapped (郭襄被捕)
72	Gathering Time (相聚時刻)
73	The Date of Agreement (約定之日)
74	Entrance to a Different World (通往其異世界的入口)
75	Fate Meets Again (命運再相逢)
76	Fierce Combat in Xiangyang (激戰襄陽)
77	Breakthrough Hatred (超越恩怨)
78	The Real Hero (真正的大俠)

== Voice cast ==
Role	Japanese voice	Cantonese voice	Mandarin voice
Yang Guo	Daisuke Namikawa	So Keung-man	Ho Chih-wei
Xiaolongnü	Mie Sonozaki	Luk Wai-ling	Wang Rui-chin
Guo Jing	Jouji Nakata	Chan Yan	Chen Chin-i / Li Shih-yang
Huang Rong	Jun Karasawa	Sim Siu-lan	Long Sian-huei / Liu Ru-ping
Guo Fu	Akiko Kimura	Cheng Lai-lai	Yao Min-min
Li Mochou	Urara Takano	Doris Lo / Wong Yuk-kuen	Yao Min-min
Lu Wushuang	Kaori	Lau Wui-wun / Cheung Chung-yan	Wang Rui-chin
Cheng Ying	Naoko Watanabe	Wong Lai-fong	Long Sian-huei
Hong Lingbo	Hikaru Ikeda	Leung Siu-ha	Long Sian-huei
Granny Sun	Junko Hori	Au Sui-wah	Long Sian-huei
Zhao Zhijing	Osamu Sakuta	Leung Chi-tat	Chen Chin-i
Yin Zhiping	Eiji Takemoto	Poon Man-pak	Li Ching-tang
Qiu Chuji		Chan Chu-kwong	Ho Chih-wei
Sun Bu'er		Lui Pik-nar	Yao Min-min
Hao Datong		Yuen Ka-cheung	Li Ching-tang
Ouyang Feng	Tetsuo Komura	Cheung Bing-keung	Li Ching-tang
Hong Qigong		Yuen Ka-cheung	Chen Chin-i
Wanyan Ping	Chieko Honda	Choi Wai-ping	Yao Min-min
Yelü Qi	Hozumi Gōda	Poon Man-pak	Li Ching-tang / Chen Chin-i
Zhu Ziliu		Lam Pou-chuen / Leung Chi-tat	Chen Chin-i / Li Ching-tang
Feng Mofeng		Chan Chu-kwong	Li Ching-tang
Gongsun Zhi	Tsuyoshi Koyama	Chiu Sai-leung	Li Ching-tang / Li Shih-yang
Qiu Qianchi	Akari Hibino	Wong Fung-ying	Wang Rui-chin / Liu Ru-ping
Gongsun Lü'e	Yuki Yamasaki	Pansy Tsang	Long Sian-huei / Yao Min-min
Zhou Botong	Mugihito	Yuen Ka-cheung	Chen Chin-i / Li Shih-yang
Huang Yaoshi		Cheung Bing-keung	Li Shih-yang
Yideng		Tam Ping-man / Lo Kwok-kuen	Ho Chih-wei / Li Shih-yang
Yinggu		Yuen Shuk-chun	Yao Min-min
Jinlun Fawang	Takashi Matsuyama	Wong Chi-king	Chen Chin-i / Li Ching-tang / Li Shih-yang
Huodu	Hozumi Gōda	Fung Kam-tong	Li Ching-tang
Da'erba	Sugino Tanuki	Lo Kwok-kuen / Cheung Bing-keung	Ho Chih-wei
Guo Xiang		Chan Hoi-ting	Wang Rui-chin
narrator	Kōsei Hirota	Chiu Sai-leung	Chen Chin-i / Li Shih-yang

== Theme songs ==
- Opening theme song (Japanese version): "Yuu" by NoR
- Opening theme song (Chinese version): "True Love is Bitter" by Andy Lau
- Ending theme song: "Blása" by Yae

== Production ==
After Nippon Animation had obtained the rights of the series, it produced the animation version with association with Jade Animation (TVB's animation studio), and decided to split the series into three parts.

== Video releases ==
Taiseng Entertainment released the first season for English-speaking audiences. Since the show was much more popular in Chinese-speaking regions, the second season was not produced in Japanese like the first season, but in Cantonese and Mandarin.

VCD video of the series was released by Warner Bros. in Hong Kong.
