= Pansy Tsang =

Hong Kong voice actress

- Chinese: 曾秀清
- Born: Tsang Sau Ching; June 23, 1966 (age 59)
- Other names: Azuki (豆豆)
- Occupation: Voice actress
- Years active: 1989–present
- Agent: TVB
- Notable credit(s): Kamikaze Kaito Jeanne as Maron Kusakabe; Azuki-chan as Azuki
- Spouse: Wong Chi Ming
- Children: 1

Pansy Tsang Sau Ching (Chinese: 曾秀清; pinyin: Tsang Sau Ching; born June 23, 1966) is a Cantonese Chinese voice actress in Hong Kong who is affiliated with Television Broadcasts Limited.

== Career ==
Tsang joined Asia Television in 1988. After the voice actor section at ATV was dismissed, she became a freelance voice actress for a short period. In 2001, she joined TVB. In January 2013, she joined Hong Kong Television Network, then returned to TVB in March 2015.

Tsang's nickname is Azuki (豆豆) because she played the part for Azuki in the anime Azuki-chan. This anime has been broadcast for a long time and her performance fit the character well.

Tsang generally acts as a younger person, teenage girls, young women and sometimes little boys. On September 9, 2002, her fans established an unofficial newsgroup for her, in which the idol would come to leave messages.

== Filmography ==
=== Anime roles ===
Leading roles in bold

- Akazukin Chacha - Shiine
- Ashita no Nadja - Sylvie Arte
- Azuki-chan - Azuki
- Boys Over Flowers - Shizuka Todo, Tsubaki Domyoji
- Cardcaptor Sakura: Clear Card - Tomoyo Daidouji
- Comic Party - Chisa Tsukamoto
- Corrector Yui - Yui Kasuga
- Di Gi Charat - Akari Usada
- Digimon Adventure 02 - Hida Iori
- Digimon Tamers - Rika Nonaka
- Fullmetal Alchemist - Lust
- Happy Lesson - Minazuki Rokumatsuri
- Hoshin Engi - Dakki
- Jang Geum's Dream - Lee Yeon-saeng
- Kaleido Star - Sora Naegino
- Kamikaze Kaito Jeanne - Maron Kusakabe
- Kimagure Orange Road - Manami Kasuga
- Kodocha - Babbit
- Les Misérables: Shōjo Cosette - Éponine
- Little Snow Fairy Sugar - Greta
- Mobile Suit Gundam SEED / Mobile Suit Gundam SEED Destiny - Cagalli Yula Athha
- Monster - Nina Fortner / Anna Liebert
- Nanaka 6/17 - Nanaka Kirisato
- Naruto - Temari
- Neon Genesis Evangelion - Rei Ayanami (ATV version)
- Neon Genesis Evangelion - Asuka Langley Soryu (Cable TV version)
- Ojamajo Doremi - Momoko Asuka, The Queen of the Witch's Land (Yuki-sensei), Nishizawa-sensei
- Petite Princess Yucie - Queen Ercell
- Pita-Ten - Hiroshi Mitarai
- Prétear - Mayune Awayuki, Shin
- Princess Tutu - Malen
- Ranma ½ - Nabiki Tendo
- RG Veda - Gandharva
- Rurouni Kenshin - Makimachi Misao
- Saint Tail - Rina Takamiya
- Seven of Seven - Black Nana (Jamanana)
- Slam Dunk - Akagi Haruko
- Sonic X - Amy Rose
- Sgt. Frog - Koyuki Azumaya
- The Galaxy Railways - Layla Destiny Shura
- The Legend of Condor Hero - Gongsun Lü'e
- Tsubasa: Reservoir Chronicle - Princess Tomoyo
- UFO Baby - Miyu Kōzuki
- Uninhabited Planet Survive! - Minori
- Yakitate!! Japan - Tsukino Azusagawa
- You're Under Arrest (Season 2) - Saori Saga
- Zatch Bell! - Suzume Mizuno and Ponygon

Fresh Pretty Cure－Love Momozono

=== Film ===
- Daredevil - Elektra Natchios played by Jennifer Garner
- Gangs of New York - Jenny Everdeane played by Cameron Diaz
- Shrek and Shrek 2 - Princess Fiona
- Vertical Limit - Annie Garrett played by Robin Tunney

=== Drama (American) ===
- Alias - Sydney Bristow played by Jennifer Garner
- Doctor Zhivago - Larissa Feodorovna played by Keira Knightley
- Heroes - Claire Bennet played by Hayden Panettiere
- Shark - Madeline Poe played by Sarah Carter
- The O.C. - Summer Roberts played by Rachel Bilson
- Ugly Betty - Hilda Suarez played by Ana Ortiz

=== Drama (Japanese) ===
- 1 Litre of Tears (TV Series) - Aya Ikeuchi played by Erika Sawajiri
- Crying Out Love, In the Center of the World - Aki Hirose played by Haruka Ayase
- Densha Otoko (TV Series) - Tsuyoshi Yamada (Ms. Hermes) played by Atsushi Itō
- News no Onna (Anchor woman) - Aso Tamaki played by Honami Suzuki
- Galileo - Kaoru Utsumi played by Kou Shibasaki
- The Queen's Classroom - Erika Sato played by Hikari Kajiwara

=== Drama (Chinese) ===
- The Drive of Life - Lee Seen-sin played by Zhao Ke
- Hanazakarino Kimitachihe - Chi Jun Li played by Vivienne Lee
- Meteor Garden - Tengtang Jing played by Winnie Qian
- My Fair Princess - Xia Ziwei played by Ruby Lin
- Romance in the Rain - Lu Ruping played by Ruby Lin
- Silence - Zhao Shen Shen played by Park Eun-hye

=== Drama (Korean) ===
- Jewel in the Palace - Lee Yeon-saeng played by Park Eun-hye, Jang-deok played by Kim Yeo-jin
- Sassy Girl Chun-hyang - Seong Chun-hyang played by Han Chae-young
- Full House - Kang Hye-won played by Han Eun-jung
- Stairway to Heaven - Han Yoo-ri played by Kim Tae-hee
- Successful Story of a Bright Girl - Yoon Na-hee played by Han Eun-jung

== Personal life ==
Tsang's husband is Wong Chi Ming, a voice actor in Hong Kong.
