= List of The Smiling, Proud Wanderer characters =

List of characters from the novel The Smiling, Proud Wanderer by Jin Yong

The following is a list of characters from the wuxia novel The Smiling, Proud Wanderer by Jin Yong.

== Five Mountain Sword Sects Alliance ==
=== Mount Hua Sect ===
- Linghu Chong (令狐冲) is the happy-go-lucky protagonist. An orphan, he was raised and trained by Yue Buqun and Ning Zhongze as their first apprentice. He learns the Nine Swords of Dugu from Feng Qingyang and becomes a formidable swordsman. His sudden improvement in swordsmanship causes his master to suspect him of having stolen and learnt the Bixie Swordplay Manual. Even after his expulsion from Mount Hua, he remains loyal and respectful towards his former master. However, they ultimately become enemies after Yue Buqun reveals his true colours. Linghu Chong eventually retires from the jianghu to lead a peaceful life with Ren Yingying. His character generally has good-natured interaction with various people from almost any walk of life without prejudice. Though he loses his qi and is in a significantly incapacitated state for much of the story, his intuitive creative grasp of sword art, plus the techniques of Dugu, allows him to either defeat, or earn the admiration of, many more-experienced masters who challenge him.
- Yue Su (岳肅) and Cai Zifeng (蔡子峰) were two Mount Hua swordsmen who became rivals and respectively founded the Qi and Sword factions. See also their connections to the Sunflower Manual.

Qi faction

- Yue Buqun (岳不羣) is the Mount Hua Sect's leader. Although he is nicknamed "Gentleman Sword" (君子劍) for his gentlemanly conduct, he gradually reveals his true personality – a bigoted, narcissistic and power-hungry hypocrite. He lusts for the Bixie Swordplay Manual and plots an elaborate scheme to seize it, after which he castrates himself to fulfil the prerequisite for learning the skill. He is also secretly jealous of Linghu Chong, refusing to accept the fact that his apprentice has surpassed him. He is incidentally killed by Yilin during the final battle with Linghu Chong while attempting to trap and kill his rivals inside a cave on Mount Hua.
- Ning Zhongze (寧中則), nicknamed "Heroine Ning" (寧女俠), is Yue Buqun's chivalrous and kindly wife. She regards Linghu Chong as a son and is also the only person who believes his innocence in the theft of the Bixie Swordplay Manual. She loses her will to live after seeing her husband reveal his true colours and learning of her daughter's death, and eventually commits suicide out of shame at her husband's actions.
- Yue Lingshan (岳靈珊) is Yue Buqun and Ning Zhongze's daughter, and Linghu Chong's first romantic interest. She falls in love with Lin Pingzhi later and marries him. However, she eventually learns that she is actually a pawn in a power struggle between her husband and her father. Lin Pingzhi kills her after she refuses to follow him to join Zuo Lengchan in taking revenge against Yue Buqun. Before dying, she makes Linghu Chong promise to spare her husband's life.
- Lin Pingzhi (林平之) is Lin Zhennan's son and the sole survivor of the Lin family. Yue Buqun saves him, takes him as an apprentice, and arranges for a marriage between him and Yue Lingshan. Driven by hatred and resentment after discovering Yue Buqun's ulterior motives, he becomes increasingly vicious and brutally kills his family's murderers in revenge, but is blinded by Mu Gaofeng. He is eventually defeated and permanently disabled by Linghu Chong, who imprisons him in an underground dungeon so that he can neither harm others nor be harmed by others.
- Lao Denuo (勞德諾) is Yue Buqun's second apprentice who is actually a spy sent by Zuo Lengchan to steal the Violet Mist Divine Skill manual from Yue Buqun. He murders Lu Dayou and attempts to push the blame to Linghu Chong. After Zuo Lengchan's death, he attempts to learn the Bixie Swordplay on his own but fails and ends up losing all his neigong. During Linghu Chong and Ren Yingying's wedding, Ren reveals that the Sun Moon Holy Cult has captured and forced Lao Denuo to live among monkeys.
- Liang Fa (梁發) is Yue Buqun's third apprentice. He is killed by Mount Song members.
- Shi Daizi (施戴子) is Yue Buqun's fourth apprentice.
- Gao Genming (高根明) is Yue Buqun's fifth apprentice.
- Lu Dayou (陸大有) is Yue Buqun's sixth apprentice who is known for his monkey-like behaviour and affinity with primates. A close friend of Linghu Chong, he is murdered by Lao Denuo, who attempts to push the blame to Linghu Chong.
- Tao Jun (陶鈞) is Yue Buqun's seventh apprentice.
- Ying Bailuo (英白羅) is Yue Buqun's eighth apprentice. After he witnesses his master trying to harm Lin Pingzhi, his master kills him outside the Lin residence in Fuzhou.
- Shu Qi (舒奇) is the youngest of Yue Buqun's apprentices.

Sword faction

- Feng Qingyang (風清揚) is an elderly Mount Hua swordsman. During the sect's internal conflict, he was lured away by the Qi faction, who used the opportunity to defeat and force the Sword faction into exile. Feeling disgraced for being deceived, he leaves the sect and leads a reclusive life in a secluded area on Mount Hua. He meets Linghu Chong by chance and teaches him the Nine Swords of Dugu as he is very impressed with Linghu Chong's good character and intelligence. His name is derived from a poem in the Classic of Poetry.
- Feng Buping (封不平) is the leader-in-exile of the Sword faction. Zuo Lengchan instigates him to return to Mount Hua to challenge Yue Buqun for the leadership position of their sect. He is defeated by Linghu Chong and forced back into exile.
- Cheng Buyou (成不憂) is Feng Buping's junior. He is torn into four pieces by the "Six Immortals of the Peach Valley".
- Cong Buqi (叢不棄) is Feng Buping's junior. He is defeated by Linghu Chong.

=== Mount Song Sect ===
- Zuo Lengchan (左冷禪) is the Mount Song Sect's ambitious and ruthless leader. He practises a skill which allows him to freeze his neigong to sub-zero temperature and increase its power tremendously. He had sent Lao Denuo to infiltrate Mount Hua and steal the Bixie Swordplay Manual from Yue Buqun; Lao Denuo steals a fake copy of the manual for him and he practises the skill without knowing it is fake. After that, he calls for an assembly of the alliance and attempts to intimidate the other four sects into submitting to him. However, he is defeated and blinded by Yue Buqun, who uses the real Bixie Swordplay against him. After his defeat, he pretends to concede the position of alliance chief to Yue Buqun. Later, he leads his followers to Mount Hua to kill Yue Buqun, who sees through his plan and traps them inside a cave. The trapped swordsmen start killing each other out of paranoia and mistrust; Zuo Lengchan is killed by Linghu Chong during the frenzy.
- Ding Mian (丁勉), Lu Bai (陸柏), Fei Bin (費彬), Deng Bagong (鄧八公), Gao Kexin (高克新), Tang Ying'e (湯英鶚), and Zhong Zhen (鍾鎮) are Zuo Lengchan's juniors.
- Yue Hou (樂厚) is one of the martial artists who attack Xiang Wentian. Linghu Chong comes to Xiang Wentian's aid and injures Yue Hou.
- Bu Chen (卜沉) is killed by Linghu Chong in Fuzhou while attempting to steal the Bixie Swordplay Manual.
- Sha Tianjiang (沙天江) is killed by Linghu Chong in Fuzhou.
- Shi Dengda (史登達) is killed by Zuo Lengchan during the alliance assembly.
- Wan Daping (萬大平) is Shi Dengda's junior.
- Di Xiu (狄修) is one of Zuo Lengchan's apprentices. He is killed by his master during the alliance assembly.

=== (North) Mount Heng Sect ===
- The "Three Elder Nuns" are the Mount Heng Sect's leaders.
  - Dingjing (定靜) is the most senior of the trio but she lets Dingxian take the lead instead. Zuo Lengchan sends his henchmen to ambush her and force her to let her sect be absorbed into the Mount Song Sect. She refuses to capitulate and dies from her wounds before Linghu Chong can save her.
  - Dingxian (定閒) is the sect's benevolent and wise leader. After being mortally wounded by a masked Yue Buqun in Shaolin Monastery, she passes the leadership position to Linghu Chong.
  - Dingyi (定逸) is the most junior of the trio and the most hot-tempered one. She and Dingxian are murdered by a masked Yue Buqun in Shaolin Monastery.
- Yilin (儀琳) is Dingyi's apprentice and the daughter of Bujie and Yapopo. She falls in love with Linghu Chong after he rescues her from Tian Boguang's sexual advances, but has to suppress her feelings because she is forbidden by her vow of celibacy. Her mother tries to force her to marry Linghu Chong but she refuses.
- Tian Boguang (田伯光) is a bandit nicknamed "Lone Traveller of Ten Thousand Li" (萬里獨行). Notorious for his lecherous behaviour and for raping many women, he makes sexual advances on Yilin but is stopped by Linghu Chong. Having lost a bet to Linghu Chong, he has to uphold a promise to leave Yilin alone from then on. Later in the novel, Bujie semi-castrates Tian and forces him to be a Buddhist monk, renaming him Buke Bujie (不可不戒; "Cannot Have No Rules"). He ultimately joins the Mount Heng Sect.
- Bujie (不戒; "No Rules"), is a Buddhist monk and Yapopo's ex-lover. He and Yapopo have a daughter, Yilin. He attempts to cure Linghu Chong of his internal wounds by injecting two streams of neigong into his body, temporarily saving Linghu's life.
- Yapopo (啞婆婆; "Mute Granny") was a Buddhist nun who fell in love with Bujie and bore him their daughter, Yilin. She has remained close to her daughter all this time by pretending to be a mute caretaker.
- Yihe (儀和) is the most senior of her generation in the sect.
- Yiqing (儀清) is Yihe's junior who succeeds Linghu Chong as the sect's leader.
- Yizhi (儀質) is Dingjing's apprentice.
- Yizhen (儀真) is Dingjing's apprentice. She delivers medicine to Yue Lingshan in Fuzhou.
- Yiling (儀靈) accompanies Yizhen to deliver medicine to Yue Lingshan.
- Yiguang (儀光) is Yilin's senior.
- Yiwen (儀文) is Dingxian's apprentice.
- Qin Juan (秦絹) is a secular apprentice of Dingjing.
- Zheng E (鄭萼) is a secular member of the sect.
- Aunt Yu (于嫂) was originally Dingxian's servant who became one of Dingxian's apprentices.

=== (South) Mount Heng Sect ===
- Mo Da (莫大) is the mysterious leader of the Mount Heng Sect who is known for playing melancholic tunes on a huqin, where his sword is concealed. His swordsmanship, which follows musical themes, is very fast and unpredictable. Although he is part of the alliance, he disapproves of Zuo Lengchan's overreach and, at one point, disobeys Zuo's order to kill Liu Zhengfeng and Qu Yang. He sees that Linghu Chong is a decent man and helps him out. At the end of the novel, he is the sole survivor from Mount Heng.
- Xiang Danian (向大年) is Liu Zhengfeng's first apprentice. He is killed by Ding Mian.
- Mi Weiyi (米為義) is Liu Zhengfeng's second apprentice.
- Fang Qianju (方千駒)
- Lu Lianrong (魯連榮)
- Liu Zhengfeng (劉正風) is Mo Da's junior. He plays the dizi and befriends Qu Yang of the Sun Moon Holy Cult, who shares the same passion for music with him. The duo compose the musical piece "Xiaoao Jianghu" together. He intends to leave the jianghu and invites fellow martial artists to witness his retirement ceremony. During the event, he is confronted by Zuo Lengchan and comes under attack. While fleeing together with Qu Yang, he meets Linghu Chong and passes him the score for "Xiaoao Jianghu". He and Qu Yang then commit suicide by bursting their arteries with their neigong.
- Madam Liu (Chinese: 劉夫人) is Liu Zhengfeng's wife who is killed by Di Xiu.
- Young Master Liu (劉公子) is Liu Zhengfeng's elder son who is killed by Di Xiu.
- Liu Jing (劉菁) is Liu Zhengfeng's daughter who is killed by Wan Daping.
- Liu Qin (劉芹) is Liu Zhengfeng's younger son.

=== Mount Tai Sect ===
- Tianmen (天門) is the Mount Tai Sect's leader. He is betrayed and overthrown by Yujizi and others, who have been bribed by Zuo Lengchan, during the alliance assembly. He then fights with Qinghai Yixiao and perishes together with him.
- Yujizi (玉磯子) is a junior of Tianmen's master. He has been bribed by Zuo Lengchan to seize his sect's leadership position from Tianmen. He debates with the "Six Immortals of the Peach Valley" on who should be the alliance's rightful leader, and attempts to fight them but ends up having his limbs torn from his body.
- Yuqingzi (玉磬子) and Yuyinzi (玉音子) are Yujizi's juniors. They are killed in the cave on Mount Hua.
- Yuzhongzi (玉鐘子) is killed by Zuo Lengchan in the cave on Mount Hua.
- Tiansong (天松) is Tianmen's junior who is injured by Tian Boguang.
- Tianyi (天乙) is among the group of martial artists who attacked Xiang Wentian. Linghu Chong comes to Xiang Wentian's aid and knocks Tianyi unconscious.
- Chi Baicheng (遲百城) is one of Tianmen's apprentices who is killed by Tian Boguang.
- Jianchu (建除) is Tianmen's second apprentice.

== Sun Moon Holy Cult ==
- Ren Woxing (任我行) is the cult's highly-feared leader, and a master of martial arts, politics, and manipulation. He mastered the Cosmic Absorbing Power (吸星大法), which allows him to drain and absorb others' neigong. After Dongfang Bubai ousted him from power, he was imprisoned in an underground dungeon in Hangzhou for 12 years. He escapes from the dungeon with help from Linghu Chong, and then returns to confront Dongfang Bubai and seize back his position. Towards the end of the novel, he dies of natural causes from a stroke while planning to destroy all the orthodox sects in the jianghu.
- Ren Yingying (任盈盈) is Ren Woxing's daughter. Although she is intelligent and caring towards her subordinates, she can be ruthless and cold-blooded at times. She meets Linghu Chong in Luoyang while in disguise as a guqin-playing old woman, and falls in love with him after being attracted by his chivalrous personality. She succeeds her father as the cult's leader after his death, but eventually retires to lead a reclusive life with Linghu Chong.
- Dongfang Bubai (東方不敗) became the cult's leader after overthrowing Ren Woxing. He castrated himself in order to fulfil the prerequisite for learning the skills in the Sunflower Manual and became the most powerful martial artist in the jianghu. He developed an intimate relationship with Yang Lianting, whom he delegated his duties to, and spent his time on embroidery. He is eventually defeated and killed by the combined efforts of Ren Woxing, Xiang Wentian, and Linghu Chong.
- Xiang Wentian (向問天) is an elder of the cult. After Dongfang Bubai overthrew Ren Woxing, he refused to renounce his loyalty to Ren and became an outcast. Linghu Chong chances upon him while he is drinking calmly in a pub under attack from a huge group of hundreds of "orthodox" martial artists, and instantly admires him and drinks alongside him. After they escape the situation together, Wentian feels grateful to Linghu Chong and decides to become sworn brothers with him after realising that both of them have had similar experiences. He later succeeds Ren Yingying as the cult's leader after she improves the cult's relations with other sects.
- Lan Fenghuang (藍鳳凰 "Blue Phoenix") is a close friend of Ren Yingying, and the leader of the Five Immortals Cult (五仙教) which serves the Sun Moon Holy Cult. After her initial attempts at healing Linghu Chong of his internal injuries, she eventually becomes his godsister. She is skilled in using poisons and can summon various venomous creatures. When her boat caravan meets Linghu Chong's group, Chong is the only person who voluntarily drinks her offering of a revolting potion made from spiders, centipedes, and snakes. Everyone in Chong's group, except for Chong, becomes violently sick from Blue Phoenix's ambient poisons, because the potion was a protectant.
- Lüzhuweng (綠竹翁, Old Man of Green Bamboo) is Ren Yingying's subordinate. He disguises himself as a guqin-playing old man who weaves bamboo baskets in Luoyang. He comforts Chong when he finds him crying in sadness about his life, which leads to an extended friendship where Bamboo and Ren Yingying teach Chong music.
- Bao Dachu (鮑大楚), Qin Weibang (秦偉邦), Wang Cheng (王誠) and Sang Sanniang (桑三娘) are among the cult's elders who defected to Dongfang Bubai when Ren Woxing was overthrown. Ren returns to confront them later after he escapes from the dungeon in Hangzhou.
- Jia Bu (賈布) is a minor leader in the cult. Dongfang Bubai orders him to lead his subordinates to (North) Mount Heng to capture Linghu Chong. He is killed by Fangzheng.
- Shangguan Yun (上官雲) accompanies Jia Bu to capture Linghu Chong. He surrenders to Ren Woxing later.
- Yang Lianting (楊蓮亭) is Dongfang Bubai's lover. He becomes the cult's de facto leader when Dongfang Bubai delegated his duties to him. He is killed by Ren Yingying.
- Tong Baixiong (童百熊) is a minor leader in the cult. He is pierced to death by Dongfang Bubai's needles.

=== Ten Elders ===
Several years ago, ten senior elders of the cult attacked the Five Mountain Sword Sects on Mount Hua but were lured into a trap and ended up being trapped inside a cave, where they eventually died. Before they died, the elders figured out new techniques to counter the swordsmanship of the five sects and carved them on the cave walls. Several years later, Linghu Chong entered the cave by chance and discovered their remains and the carvings.

- Zhang Chengyun (張乘雲) specialised in using pole weapons.
- Zhang Chengfeng (張乘風) was Zhang Chengyun's brother who also specialised in using pole weapons.
- Fan Song (范松) specialised in using axes.
- Zhao He (趙鶴) specialised in using clubs.

=== Qu family ===
- Qu Yang (曲洋) is a cult elder who plays the guqin. He befriends Liu Zhengfeng, who shares the same passion for music as him, and composes the musical piece "Xiaoao Jianghu" with him. He commits suicide together with Liu Zhengfeng when both of them are cornered by Zuo Lengchan's followers. Before dying, the two of them pass the score of "Xiaoao Jianghu" to Linghu Chong.
- Qu Feiyan (曲非煙) is Qu Yang's granddaughter. She is killed by Fei Bin.

== Shaolin Sect ==
- Fangzheng (方證) is the Shaolin abbot and a highly-respected figure in the jianghu for his combat prowess and morally upright character. A neutral party in the power struggles of the jianghu, he is one of the few who see through Yue Buqun's hypocrisy early in the story. After meeting Linghu Chong, he invites Linghu to join Shaolin as a secular member so that Linghu can learn the Yijin Jing to heal himself. Fangzheng proves to be at least Ren Woxing's equal when they fight each other for the first time.
- Fangsheng (方生) is Fangzheng's junior.
- Xin Guoliang (辛國樑), Yi Guozi (易國梓), Huang Guobai (黃國柏), and Jueyue (覺月) are Shaolin members killed by Ren Yingying.

== Wudang Sect ==
- Chongxu (沖虚) is Wudang's leader and a highly-respected figure in the jianghu. He maintains a close friendship with the Shaolin abbot Fangzheng. While travelling in disguise as a farmer, he meets Linghu Chong, engages him in a friendly duel, and feels impressed when Linghu Chong uses the Nine Swords of Dugu to defeat his Taiji Swordplay.
- Qingxu (清虛) is Chongxu's junior who disguises himself as a woodcutter.
- Chenggao (成高) is an apprentice of Chongxu's junior. He follows Chongxu around in disguise as a vegetable seller.

== Qingcheng Sect ==
- Yu Canghai (余滄海) is the Qingcheng Sect's leader. After Lin Pingzhi accidentally killed his son in a brawl, he massacres the Lin family in the name of avenging his son while using the opportunity to search for the Bixie Swordplay manual. He does not find it. Lin Pingzhi survives the massacre, joins the Mount Hua Sect, and returns to take his revenge on the Qingcheng Sect in the later chapters.
- Yu Renyan (余人彥) is Yu Canghai's son who is killed by Lin Pingzhi.
- The "Four Gentlemen of Qingcheng" (青城四秀) are Yu Canghai's four most senior apprentices. Three of them, Hou Renying (侯人英), Hong Renxiong (洪人雄), and Yu Renhao (于人豪) are killed by Lin Pingzhi. The fourth, Luo Renjie (羅人傑), is killed by Linghu Chong.
- Jia Renda (賈人達) is trampled to death by Lin Pingzhi's horse.
- Fang Renzhi (方人智) is stabbed to death by Lin Pingzhi.
- Li Rencai (黎人才)
- Peng Renqi (彭人騏) is killed by Tian Boguang.
- Ji Rentong (吉人通) is killed by Lin Pingzhi.
- Shen Renjun (申人俊)

== Fuwei Security Service ==
- Lin Yuantu (林遠圖) was the founder of the Fuwei Security Service. Previously a Shaolin monk known as Duyuan (渡元), he returned to secular life and created the Bixie Swordplay based on Yue Su and Cai Zifeng's recollections of the Sunflower Manual. Although his use of the Bixie Swordplay brought him fame and glory, it also became a curse to his descendants because it made them the target of many martial artists seeking to seize possession of the Bixie Swordplay Manual and master the skill. He hid the manual in the Lin family residence in Fuzhou and passed down a family rule forbidding his descendants from seeking the manual and learning the skill, as it requires the practitioner to fulfil a prerequisite that will end their bloodline.
- Lin Zhennan (林震南) is Lin Pingzhi's father and the security service's current owner. After his son accidentally kills Yu Canghai's son in a brawl, the Qingcheng Sect attacks the security service and massacres everyone. Lin Zhennan and his wife are later captured by Mu Gaofeng, who tortures them to death.
- Madam Wang (王夫人) is Wang Yuanba's daughter, Lin Zhennan's wife, and Lin Pingzhi's mother.

== Golden Saber Clan ==
- Wang Yuanba (王元霸) is the leader of the Luoyang-based Golden Saber Clan (金刀門) and Lin Pingzhi's maternal grandfather. Like many others in the jianghu, he secretly covets the Bixie Swordplay manual and mistakenly thinks that the musical score of "Xiaoao Jianghu", which is in Linghu Chong's possession, is the manual.
- Wang Bofen (王伯奮) is Wang Yuanba's eldest son.
- Wang Zhongqiang (王仲強) is Wang Yuanba's second son.
- Wang Jiajun (王家駿) is Wang Zhongqiang's eldest son.
- Wang Jiaju (王家駒) is Wang Zhongqiang's youngest son.
- Adviser Yi (易師爺) is the Wang family's accountant and an amateur musician. He suggests to his master to bring the score of "Xiaoao Jianghu" to Lüzhuweng to verify that it is indeed a musical score and not a swordplay manual.

== Four Friends of Jiangnan ==
The "Four Friends of Jiangnan" (江南四友) is a group of four eccentric martial artists tasked with watching over Ren Woxing in the underground dungeon in Hangzhou.

- Huangzhonggong (黃鍾公) is a music fanatic who challenges Linghu Chong to a duel over the score of the "Guangling Melody". After Ren Woxing breaks out of prison, he chooses to commit suicide instead of surrendering.
- Heibaizi (黑白子) is a weiqi fanatic with a pale face and dark hair. He becomes a handicap after Linghu Chong unknowingly uses the Cosmic Absorbing Power on him, and ends up being killed by Ren Woxing.
- Tubiweng (禿筆翁) is a calligraphy fanatic who challenges Linghu Chong to a duel but loses. Ren Woxing forces him to surrender and consume a poison pill to prove his loyalty.
- Danqingsheng (丹青生) is an alcoholic drink connoisseur and swordsman who befriends Linghu Chong over their common interest in alcoholic drinks. Ren Woxing forces him to surrender in the same manner as Tubiweng.
- Ding Jian (丁堅) and Shi Lingwei (施令威) are swordsmen serving under the Four Friends.

== Guests at Liu Zhengfeng's retirement ceremony ==
- Master Xia (夏老拳师) is the leader of the Six Harmonies Clan (六合門) in Zhengzhou.
- Tie Laolao (鐵老老) is from the Divine Maiden Peak at the Three Gorges.
- Pan Hou (潘吼) is the chief of the Haisha Clan (海沙幫) from the eastern sea.
- Bai Ke (白克) is nicknamed "Divine Saber" (神刀).
- Lu Xisi (盧西思) is nicknamed "Divine Brush" (神筆).
- Official Zhang (張大人) is an official who recommends Liu Zhengfeng to serve in the government.

== Kunlun Sect ==
- Zhenshanzi (震山子) is the leader of the Kunlun Sect.
- Tan Diren (譚迪人) is accidentally killed by Linghu Chong.

== Beggar Clan ==
- Xie Feng (解風) is the chief of the Beggar Clan.
- Zhang Jin'ao (張金鰲) is the deputy chief of the Beggar Clan who is among the guests at Liu Zhengfeng's retirement ceremony.

== Others ==
- The "Six Immortals of the Peach Valley" (桃谷六仙) are six brothers, each named after a different part of the peach tree. They are often absorbed in bickering with each other about trivial sibling rivalries, but they are united when they take action. They try to cure Linghu Chong of his internal injuries by injecting six streams of neigong into his body but end up worsening his condition instead. Eventually, they become Linghu Chong's allies and join the (North) Mount Heng Sect after Linghu becomes its leader. They are depicted as having no social graces or friends, but are extremely powerful in martial arts.
- Mu Gaofeng (木高峰) is a notorious hunchbacked bandit. He tries to force Lin Pingzhi to be his apprentice and tortures Lin's parents to death when Lin refuses. His hunchback is actually a sack containing poison gas, which when torn, will release the gas and blind everyone around it. Lin Pingzhi eventually tracks him down and kills him to avenge his parents, but becomes blinded in the process after accidentally releasing the poison gas.
- Ping Yizhi (平一指) is a physician nicknamed "Famous Killer Physician" (殺人名醫). He believes that life and death are predestined, so saving a life is equivalent to violating the law of nature. As such, he makes a rule that for every life he saves, another must die. He fails to cure Linghu Chong of his internal injuries and commits suicide in shame.
- Laotouzi (老頭子) and Zu Qianqiu (祖千秋) are nicknamed "Grand Ancestors of the Yellow River" (黃河老祖). Zu tricked Linghu Chong into consuming eight pills created by Laotouzi to cure his daughter, Laobusi (老不死), of a rare illness. After Linghu Chong finds out the truth, he willingly uses his blood, which contains traces of the pills, to save Laobusi, and earns their gratitude in return.
- Ji Wushi (計無施)
- Zhucaoxian (諸草仙) is the leader of the Hundred Herbs Clan (百藥門).
- Baixiong (白熊) and Heixiong (黑熊) are a pair of cannibalistic martial artists from northern China.
- Qiu Songnian (仇松年) is a long-haired wandering monk who uses a pair of crescent-shaped blades. He is killed by Yuling.
- Madam Zhang (張夫人) uses a pair of short swords. She is killed by You Xun.
- Xibao (西寶) is a monk who uses a pair of large cymbals. He is killed by Yan Sanxing.
- Yuling (玉靈) is a Taoist who uses a wolf's teeth club. He is killed by Zhou Gutong and Wu Baiying.
- Yan Sanxing (嚴三星) sports green serpent tattoos on his shoulders. He is killed by Zhou Gutong and Wu Baiying.
- Zhou Gutong (周孤桐) and Wu Baiying (吳柏英) are a couple who are each blind in one eye. They use golden walking sticks as their weapons.
- You Xun (游迅) is killed by Ren Yingying.
- Sima Da (司馬大) is the lord of Long Whale Island (長鯨島).
- Huang Boliu (黃伯流) is the chief of the Heavenly River Clan (天河幫).
- The "Twin Swords of Diancang" (點蒼雙劍) are a pair of swordsmen from the Diancang Sect (點蒼派). They are killed by Xiang Wentian.
- Songwen (松紋) is a Taoist from the Emei Sect. He is scared away by Xiang Wentian.
- Wu Tiande (吳天德) is a military officer from Quanzhou. Linghu Chong steals his uniform and horse and disguises himself as him.
- Qingxiao (清曉) is the abbess of Water Moon Nunnery (水月庵) in Longquan. She lends her sword to the (North) Mount Heng Sect.
- The "Twin Flying Fish of the Yangtze River" (長江雙飛魚) are from the White Dragon Clan (白蛟幫) in Jiujiang.
- Qinghai Yixiao (青海一梟) attacks Tianmen during the alliance assembly. He dies together with Tianmen.
