= Fu Tong Wong =

Chinese-American musician/composer (born 1948)

Fu Tong Wong (Chinese: 黃輔棠; born 1948) is a Chinese-American musician/composer currently residing in Taiwan. Wong was born in Panyu, Guangdong, received musical training at Guangzhou College of Music and spent several years at a cultural camp during the time of Cultural Revolution.

== Major Compositions ==
- "Xi Shi – the Opera", is the first opera using the Chinese language presenting the historical story and tragedy of one of the four Chinese Beauties
- "Symphony: The Hero with Great Eagle", based on Jin Yong's beloved novel The Return of the Condor Heroes. Wong utilizes western music to deliver the story and fate of the famous wuxia heroic couple. It took Wong 28 years to perfect the piece and contains eight movements. At the world premier concert at Hong Kong in 1996, Jin Yong himself wrote the heading as a gift and recognition for Wong's work
- "Shiau-Feng Symphonic Poem", based on yet another Jin Yong's novel character – Qiao Feng. Besides being one of Wong's favorite wuxia figure, the symphony was also written in remembrance of Maestro Henry Mazer's contribution for Taiwan and the Taipei Philharmonic Orchestra
- "Chinese National Music: Xiaoao Jianghu", also based on Jin Yong's novel The Smiling, Proud Wanderer. The entire piece was arranged in traditional Chinese musical instruments such as erhu, pipa, sheng, yangqin, etc.

== Books (only available in the Chinese Language) ==
- 1983 Essays on Violin Teaching
- 1985 Fu Tong Wong's Introductory Violin
- 1986 Discussions about instruments and music
- 1990 Enjoying Music
- 1995 Teaching How To Teach, Learning How To Teach
- 1998 Appreciation of Another Musician
- 1998 The Development and Practice of Violin Group-Teaching
- 2004 Fu Tong Wong's Music Theory
- 2004 In the Midst of Joy/Music

== Discography ==
his recording are:

- 1985 Homeland Dreams (Yoko Kubo, Violin; Yaeko Sasaki, Piano)
- 1996 Gin Se – Ancient Chinese Poems and Songs
- 2000 Rhapsody of Taiwan (Henry Mazer, Conductor; Taipei Philharmonic Orchestra)
- 2001 The Songs of Fu Tong Wong in Live Performance (various artists)
- 2005 Symphony: The Hero with Great Eagle (Mak Ka-lok, conductor; Voronezh State Symphony Orchestra, Russia)
- 2010 Postcards from China (Cho-Liang Lin, violin; Evelyn Chen, Piano)
