= Fuzi =

Instrument used in Chinese Buddhism and Taoism

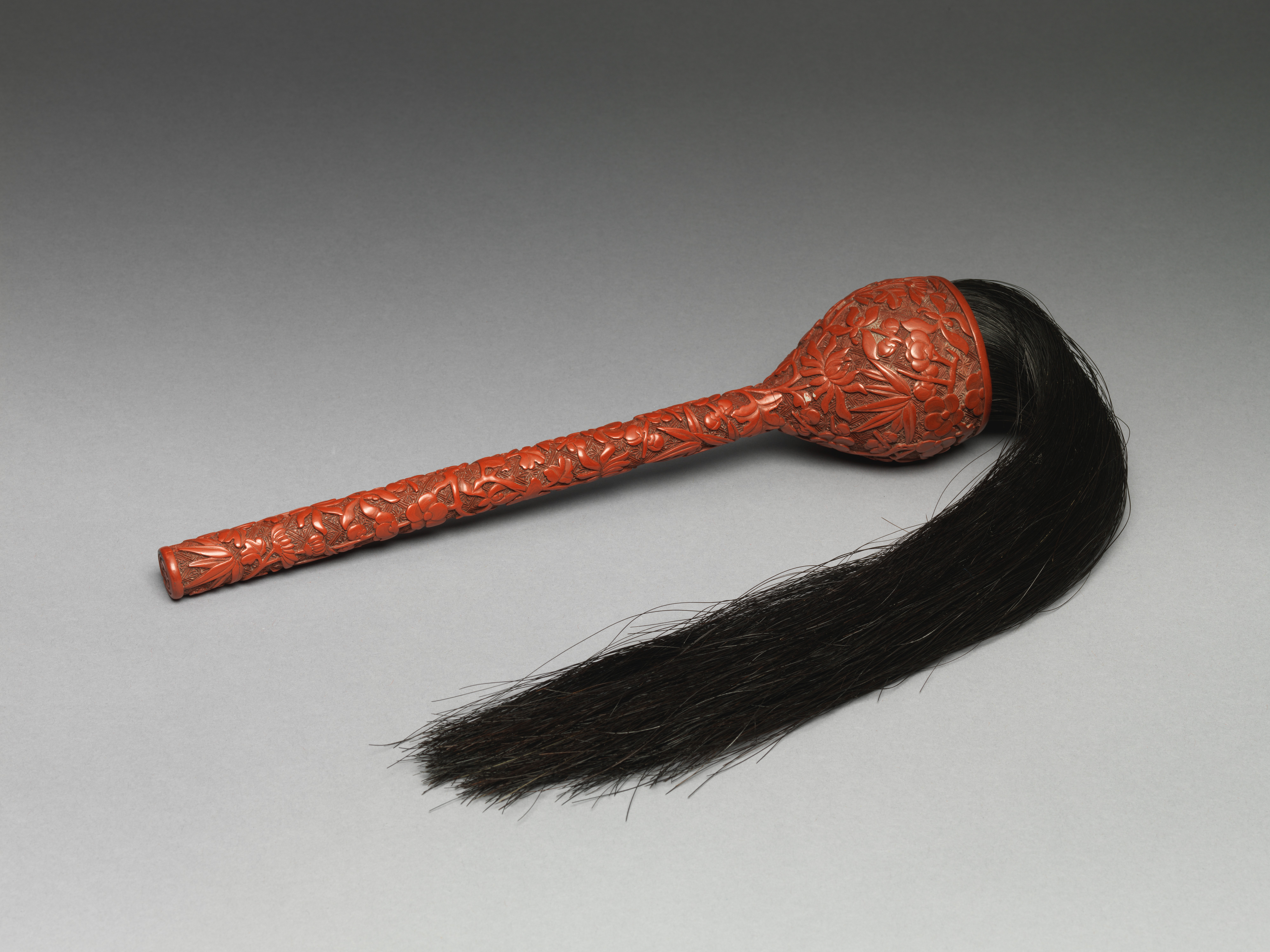
Ming dynasty (1368–1644) fuzi, decorated with emblems depicting the flowers of the four seasons. Held at the Metropolitan Museum of Art.

A fuzi (Chinese: 拂子, pinyin: Fúzi), also known as a fuchen (Traditional Chinese: 拂塵; Simplified Chinese: 拂尘; pinyin: Fúchén), is a type of fly-whisk, consisting of a short staff with hair (from an animal such as a cow, horse, or yak) that are used as instruments by Chan Buddhist monks and Taoist daoshi. Originally used as a tool to shoo away flies from livestock without injuring them, it eventually came to be adopted by Buddhism and Taoism as it was perceived as having the power to sweep away desires and evil influences both in the environment of the holder and within their own thoughts, bringing them closer to enlightenment (in Buddhism) or transcending the mortal realm (in Taoism).

== Buddhism ==
In the Chinese Chan tradition, the fuzi, viewed as a symbol of the Buddhist precept against killing, is widely institutionalized as a symbol of the office of a Chan master, and it is one of the accoutrements which they are traditionally depicted as holding in formal portraits. During daily monastic services, it is common practice among Chan masters to take hold of the fuzi while ascending the lecture podium or seat before delivering their sermon. Through a process of metonymy, the term "bingfu" (Chinese: 秉拂, pinyin: Bǐngfú), meaning "taking up the fuzi", eventually became used to refer to a formal Chan sermon. In the event of a Chan master's absence or indisposition from their monastic duties, their fuzi is usually passed to one of the other head monks or "chief officers" (Traditional Chinese: 頭首; Simplified Chinese: 头首; pinyin: Tóushǒu) who will wield it in their stead.

== Taoism ==
In Taoist terminology, the term "fuchen" is more commonly used to refer to the instrument than "fuzi". In Taoist traditions, the fuchen is also viewed as a symbol of authority and power and are usually wielded by daoshis as a ritual instrument for purifying spaces and expelling evil during rites and ceremonies. Taoist immortals and various deities, such as Laozi, are also traditionally depicted as wielding the fuchen in iconographic portrayals. In certain Taoist lineages, especially those associated with the Wudang style of martial arts, the fuchen is also incorporated as a tool or weapon for training.
