= Lam Pou-chuen =

Hong Kong voice actor (1951–2015)

Lam Pou-chuen 林保全
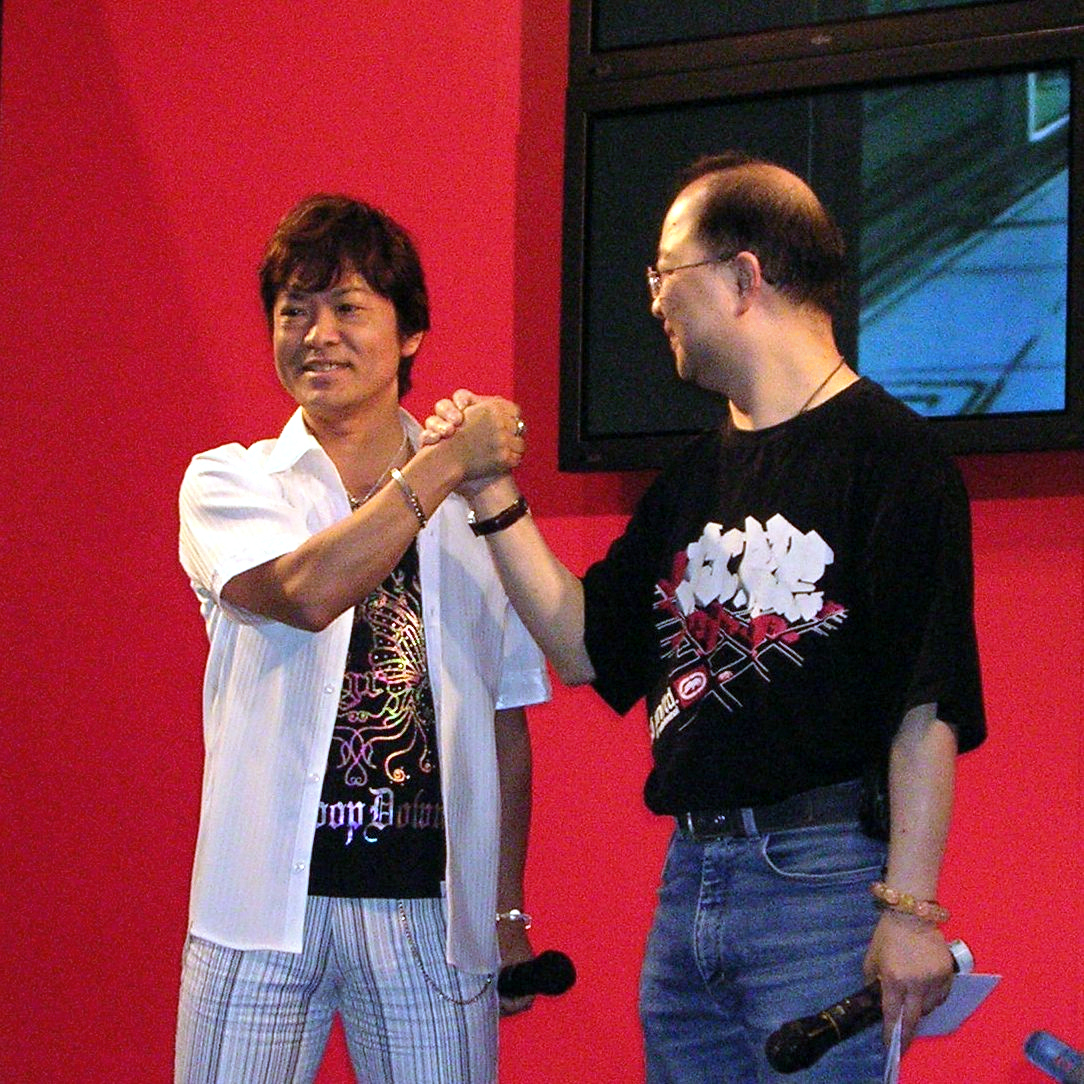
- Tōru Furuya (left) and Lam (right) at Ani-Com Hong Kong in July 2006
- Born: 10 October 1951; Portuguese Macau
- Died: 2 January 2015 (aged 63); Nethersole Hospital, Tai Po, Hong Kong
- Other name: Francis Lam
- Occupation: Voice actor
- Years active: 1971-2015
- Known for: Voice of Doraemon in Hong Kong version
- Children: Safina Lam

Chinese name
- Traditional Chinese: 林保全
- Simplified Chinese: 林保全
Transcriptions
Standard Mandarin
- Hanyu Pinyin: Lín Bǎoquán
Yue: Cantonese
- Jyutping: Lam4 Bou2cyun4

Lam Pou-chuen (Chinese: 林保全; pinyin: Lín Bǎoquán; 10 October 1951 – 2 January 2015) was a Hong Kong voice actor who was best known for voicing the character Doraemon for the Hong Kong version of the anime for over thirty years in addition to being the Cantonese voice of Sammo Hung in many of his dubbed blockbusters.

== Life ==
Lam was born in Portuguese Macau but moved to Hong Kong as a teenager. He first worked as an office boy for a bank, but after being impressed by the voice acting of Tarzan he applied to be a voice actor at Hong Kong's TVB in 1971. Lam voiced the title character for Doraemon since the very first episode was broadcast by TVB in 1981. He continued to be the voice of Doraemon throughout the decades, only being briefly replaced in 1992 when he went over to the rival station Asia Television for a short period. Lam's continuous involvement sets Hong Kong's Doraemon apart from the original Japanese production which went through a re-launch in 2005, resulting in a complete change of voice cast. Lam and other cast members at the time reprised their roles when TVB started to broadcast the new 2005 series. Like his Japanese counterpart, the actor's Doraemon voice is instantly recognisable in Hong Kong and from time to time appears on variety shows and TV commercials.

Other prominent roles in animation that Lam had voiced include Garfield, Amuro Ray in Mobile Suit Gundam, Genzo Wakabayashi in Captain Tsubasa, Hiei in Yu Yu Hakusho and Squirtle in Pokémon. Outside animation, he was also the voice of the corrupt Qing dynasty official Heshen in the 2001 Chinese television series The Eloquent Ji Xiaolan, which remained his favourite role. He was also the usual voice for Sammo Hung and George Clooney in Cantonese dubs of their films.

During the morning of 2 January 2015, Lam was found unconscious by his family at home. He was taken to Nethersole Hospital, but was ultimately declared dead at the age of 63. Lam was known to be suffering from diabetes, which might have contributed to a myocardial infarction. His last work was the 3D feature film Stand by Me Doraemon, which had yet to be released in Hong Kong at the time of his death.

== Filmography ==
=== Animated roles ===
- Alpen Rose - Leonhard Aschenbach
- Captain Tsubasa - Genzo Wakabayashi
- Detective Conan - Inspector Jūzō Megure
- Digimon Adventure - Tentomon
- Doraemon - Doraemon
- Fullmetal Alchemist and Fullmetal Alchemist: Brotherhood - Barry the Chopper, Vato Falman and Zampano
- The Garfield Show - Garfield
- Hamtaro - Taishō-kun
- Jang Geum's Dream - Kang Duk-gu
- The Legend of Condor Hero - Wang Chongyang and Zhu Ziliu
- Les Misérables: Shōjo Cosette - Bishop Myriel
- Sailor Moon - Jadeite and Yuuichirou Kumada (TVB dub), Tuxedo Mask (season 1, VCD dub)

=== Film ===
- Air Force One - Norman Caldwell played by William H. Macy
- Batman & Robin - Batman played by George Clooney
- Coming to America - Akeem Joffer played by Eddie Murphy
- Jurassic Park - Dennis Nedry played by Wayne Knight
- Police Story - Chief Inspector Raymond Li played by Lam Kwok-hung
- Starship Troopers - Zander Barcalow played by Patrick Muldoon

=== Drama (American) ===
- Alias - Michael Vaughn played by Michael Vartan
- Bones - Jacob Broadsky played by Arnold Vosloo
- Desperate Housewives - Tom Scavo played by Doug Savant
- ER - Doug Ross played by George Clooney
- Heroes - Noah Bennet played by Jack Coleman
- The West Wing - Jed Bartlet played by Martin Sheen
- Without a Trace - Martin Fitzgerald played by Eric Close

=== Drama (Chinese) ===
- The Drive of Life - Li Dashan played by Dong Zhihua
- The Eloquent Ji Xiaolan - Heshen played by Wang Gang
- Journey to the West - Sun Wukong played by Liu Xiao Ling Tong

=== Drama (Korean) ===
- Hur Jun - Im Oh-geun played by Im Hyun-sik
- Jewel in the Palace - Kang Duk-gu played by Im Hyun-sik
