= Dugu Qiubai =

Fictional character in Jin Yong's wuxia novels

- The Return of the Condor Heroes; The Smiling, Proud Wanderer; The Deer and the Cauldron; character
- Created by: Jin Yong

In-universe information
- Nickname: "Sword Devil"
- Gender: Male

Dugu Qiubai
- Traditional Chinese: 獨孤求敗
- Simplified Chinese: 独孤求败
- Literal meaning: Loner seeking a defeat
Transcriptions
Standard Mandarin
- Hanyu Pinyin: Dúgū Qiúbaì
Yue: Cantonese
- Jyutping: Duk^{6}-gu^{1} Kau^{4}-baai^{6}

Dugu Qiubai (獨孤求敗), literally "A Loner Who Seeks Defeat", is a fictional character mentioned by name only in three wuxia novels by Jin Yong (Louis Cha): The Return of the Condor Heroes, The Smiling, Proud Wanderer, and The Deer and the Cauldron. A formidable swordsman who lived long before the events of the novels take place, he was nicknamed "Sword Devil" (劍魔) to reflect his prowess in and devotion to the perfection of swordsmanship to the point where he had attained the philosophical level of "swordsmanship without a sword".

== Name ==
Dugu Qiubai's family name Dugu (literally "alone") suggests that he was ethnically Xianbei; his given name "Qiubai" literally means "seek defeat". His full name thus roughly translates to "A Loner Who Seeks Defeat", representing his status as a formidable swordsman haunted by solitude as no one can rival him in swordsmanship.

== Fictional character biography ==
=== In The Return of the Condor Heroes ===
This novel is set in the 13th century during the Mongol conquest of China. The protagonist, Yang Guo, encounters the Condor, a giant eagle-like creature which was once Dugu Qiubai's companion. The Condor saves Yang Guo, who has just lost his right arm, and leads him to Dugu Qiubai's Tomb of Swords. There, with the Condor's help, Yang Guo inherits Dugu Qiubai's Heavy Iron Sword and learns how to use it. The use of the Heavy Iron Sword requires much neigong as it emphasises simple swings and movements supported by strong neigong exertion. Although it lacks the fancy and stylish movements of typical swordplay styles, it is extremely effective. When Yang Guo is learning this technique, he realises he can break average swords immediately when he channels his neigong into the sword during duels. The sword's weight also boosts the power of his swings and thrusts.

=== The Smiling, Proud Wanderer ===
This novel features the Nine Swords of Dugu, a set of nine sword stances created by Dugu Qiubai. The protagonist, Linghu Chong, learns it from the reclusive swordsman Feng Qingyang and uses it to counter the Bixie Swordplay (辟邪劍法) used by the villains.

=== The Deer and the Cauldron ===
This novel is set in 17th-century China during the Qing dynasty. In a brief inner monologue during a conversation with the protagonist Wei Xiaobao, the Shaolin monk Chengguan ponders about two great swordsmen in the past who had fought without following any particular stances: Dugu Qiubai and Linghu Chong.

== Nine Swords of Dugu ==
The Nine Swords of Dugu (獨孤九劍) are nine independent sword stances created to overpower all sorts of weapons, including swords, sabers, spears, clubs, staffs, whips, and arrows, as well as bare-handed attacks. This swordplay has nine stances, each of which is designed to counter a particular style of martial arts. The mastery of all nine forms allows the swordsman to counter a wide range of moves, including those involving the use of weapons. The first core element of the swordplay is speed. The swordsman is trained to quickly predict and identify the weaknesses in the moves executed by an opponent, and then attack those weak points. The second core element of the swordplay is its formless nature and adaptability. Unlike typical martial arts styles described in wuxia stories, the moves of the Nine Swords of Dugu do not follow any fixed sequence or pattern. As such, it is impossible for an opponent to predict and counter correspondingly. The key to mastering the swordplay is to understand the two core elements instead of rigidly memorising all the stances. Once the swordsman has grasped the essence of the swordplay, he can use it in endless forms and variations, hence the swordplay has no fixed sequence or pattern. During combat, the less the swordsman remembers, the less restricted he is by the original stances. He is thus able to customise and adapt the swordplay accordingly.

The nine stances are:

1. General Index Stance (總訣式)
2. Sword-defeating Stance (破劍式)
3. Saber-defeating Stance (破刀式)
4. Spear-defeating Stance (破槍式)
5. Whip-defeating Stance (破鞭式)
6. Chain whip-defeating Stance (破索式)
7. Palm-defeating Stance (破掌式)
8. Arrow-defeating Stance (破箭式)
9. Qi-defeating Stance (破氣式)

== Tomb of Swords ==
Dugu Qiubai's final resting place is known as the Tomb of Swords. In The Return of the Condor Heroes the Condor leads Yang Guo to the tomb, where Yang Guo reads a statement which Dugu Qiubai carved in stone:

"Having roamed the jianghu for more than 30 years, I have killed all my foes and defeated all champions. Under Heaven, no one is my equal. With no other choice, I can only retreat and live in seclusion in this deep valley, with only a Condor as my companion. Alas, all my life, I have sought a match but in vain. Unbearable loneliness is my destiny." — "Sword Devil" Dugu Qiubai

Yang Guo also read this at the Tomb of Swords:

""Sword Devil" Dugu Qiubai has become the invincible and unchallenged swordsman under Heaven, hence he buried his swords here. The heroes of the realm bow before him. Now, his Long Sword is of no use anymore. The agony!"

The first sword (present)
"His first sword was so sharp, strong, and fierce that none could withstand it. With it in hand, he strove for mastery by challenging all the heroes of the Northern Plains in his teenage years."
The second sword (not present, represented by a wooden tablet)
"His second sword was violet in hue and flexible in motion. He used it in his 20s. With it, he had mistakenly wounded righteous men. It turned out to be a weapon of doom that caused him to feel remorse endlessly. He cast it into a deep canyon."
The third sword (present)
"His third sword was heavy and blunt. The uttermost cunning is based on simplicity. With it, he roamed all lands under Heaven unopposed in his 30s."
The fourth sword (represented by a wooden sword)
"After the age of 40, he was no longer hampered by any weapon. Grass, trees, bamboo, and rocks could all be used by him as swords. Since then, he had developed his skills further, such that gradually he could win duels without reaching for weapons."
