= The Return of the Condor Heroes =

1959–1961 wuxia novel by Jin Yong

- Chapter 1, Part 1 of The Return of the Condor Heroes, as it appeared on the 20 May 1959 issue of Ming Pao
- Author: Jin Yong
- Original title: 神鵰俠侶
- Language: Chinese
- Series: Condor Trilogy
- Genre: Wuxia
- Publisher: Ming Pao
- Publication date: 20 May 1959
- Publication place: Hong Kong
- Media type: Print
- ISBN: 9786263615885
- Preceded by: The Legend of the Condor Heroes
- Followed by: The Heaven Sword and Dragon Saber

The Return of the Condor Heroes
- Traditional Chinese: 神鵰俠侶
- Simplified Chinese: 神雕侠侣
- Literal meaning: The Divine Eagle and the Heroic Couple
Transcriptions
Standard Mandarin
- Hanyu Pinyin: Shén Diāo Xiá Lǚ
Yue: Cantonese
- Jyutping: San^{4} Diu^{1} Haap^{6} Leoi^{5}

The Return of the Condor Heroes (神鵰俠侶), also translated as The Giant Eagle and Its Companion, is a wuxia novel by Jin Yong (Louis Cha). It is the second part of the Condor Trilogy and was preceded by The Legend of the Condor Heroes and followed by The Heaven Sword and Dragon Saber. It was first serialised between 20 May 1959 and 5 July 1961 in the Hong Kong newspaper Ming Pao.

The story revolves around the protagonist, Yang Guo, and his lover and martial arts master, Xiaolongnü, in their adventures in the wulin (martial artists' community), where love between master and apprentice is seen as taboo. Jin Yong revised the novel in 1970 and again in 2004. There are 40 chapters in the second and third revisions. Each chapter has a title composed of four Chinese characters. Most of the revisions are either clarifications or minor alterations of character motivations or names. The Chinese title of the novel approximately translates to The Magical Condor and its Hero Companion.

== Plot summary ==
Set in 13th-century China against the backdrop of the Mongol Empire's expansion, the story follows Yang Guo, the orphaned son of the characters Yang Kang and Mu Nianci from the previous novel.

After his mother’s death, Yang Guo is taken in by the couple Guo Jing and Huang Rong, but tensions arise due to his parentage and temperament. He is sent to the Quanzhen Sect, where he suffers mistreatment under his master, Zhao Zhijing. Yang Guo eventually flees and encounters Xiaolongnü, the reclusive master of the Ancient Tomb Sect. She takes him as her apprentice, and the two develop a deep romantic bond as they train together in isolation.

Considered taboo in the wulin, their romance is further strained by a series of misunderstandings and external conflicts. Xiaolongnü is sexually assaulted by a Quanzhen member, leading to a mistaken belief that Yang Guo is responsible, and she leaves him. During their separation, Yang Guo wanders around, encountering various figures, including two of the top five martial artists in the wulin – Hong Qigong and Ouyang Feng, both of whom die after a final duel witnessed by him.

Yang Guo later reunites with Xiaolongnü, but their attempts to remain together are thwarted by opposition from prominent members of the wulin and repeated crises, including interference from the villainous Jinlun Guoshi. Refusing to abandon Xiaolongnü, Yang Guo rejects a proposed marriage to the Guos' elder daughter Guo Fu and openly defies social convention.

While seeking a cure for a deadly poison, the pair become entangled in the affairs of Gongsun Zhi, the ruthless master of Passionless Valley, and his estranged wife Qiu Qianchi. Yang Guo briefly turns against the Guos after learning of his father's past, but ultimately abandons thoughts of revenge after witnessing Guo Jing's heroic actions. During the defence of Xiangyang against the Mongols, Yang Guo aids the Guos, demonstrating his growing sense of loyalty and righteousness.

Amidst the turmoil, Yang Guo loses his right arm and later trains under the Condor, a giant eagle-like creature associated with the legendary swordsman Dugu Qiubai, and not only overcomes his disability but also tremendously improves his prowess in martial arts. Xiaolongnü is gravely poisoned and, believing herself beyond saving, leaves Yang Guo after promising to meet him again in 16 years. To give him hope, Huang Rong fabricates a story that Xiaolongnü can be cured elsewhere.

During the intervening years, Yang Guo becomes known as the "Divine Condor Hero", roaming the wulin and performing acts of chivalry. 16 years later, he reunites with Xiaolongnü, who has survived and recovered. Together, they rescue the Guos' younger daughter Guo Xiang from Jinlun Guoshi and assist in the final defence of Xiangyang. During the battle, Yang Guo singlehandedly kills the Mongol leader Möngke Khan and temporarily halts the Mongol invasion.

After the conflict, Yang Guo and Xiaolongnü withdraw from the wulin. At a later gathering on Mount Hua, a new generation of the "Five Greats" – the top five martial artists in the wulin – is recognised, with Yang Guo and Guo Jing counted among them. Yang Guo ultimately departs with Xiaolongnü to live in seclusion, while the wider struggle against the Mongols continues beyond the novel's scope.

== Translations ==
A four-part English translation is being published by MacLehose Press, with the first part, A Past Unearthed, being released in 2023.

== Adaptations ==
=== Films ===
Year	Production	Director(s)	Main cast	Additional information
1960	Emei Film Company (Hong Kong)	Lee Fa	Patrick Tse, Nam Hung, Lam Kau, Chan Wai-yue	The Great Heroes
1982	Shaw Brothers Studio (Hong Kong)	Chang Cheh	Alexander Fu, Philip Kwok, Gigi Wong, Lung Tien-hsiang, Lam Sau-kwan	The Brave Archer and His Mate
1983	Shaw Brothers Studio (Hong Kong)	Hua Shan	Leslie Cheung, Mary Jean Reimer, Chen Kuan-tai, Leanne Liu	Little Dragon Maiden

=== Television series ===
Year	Production	Main cast	Additional information
1976	CTV (Hong Kong)	Law Lok-lam, Lee Tong-ming, Jason Pai, Michelle Yim	The Return of the Condor Heroes (1976 TV series)
1983	TVB (Hong Kong)	Andy Lau, Idy Chan, Bryan Leung, Susanna Au-yeung	The Return of the Condor Heroes (1983 TV series)
1984	CTV (Taiwan)	Meng Fei, Angela Pan, Hsiang Yun-peng, Chang Han-po, Shen Hai-jung	The Return of the Condor Heroes (1984 TV series)
1995	TVB (Hong Kong)	Louis Koo, Carman Lee, Jason Pai, Bonnie Ngai	The Condor Heroes 95
1998	MediaCorp (Singapore)	Christopher Lee, Fann Wong, Zhu Houren, Shirley Ho	The Return of the Condor Heroes (Singaporean TV series)
1998	TTV (Taiwan)	Richie Ren, Jacklyn Wu, Sun Xing, Patricia Ha	The Return of the Condor Heroes (1998 Taiwanese TV series)
2001	Nippon Animation (Japan)	Daisuke Namikawa, Mie Sonozaki	The Legend of Condor Hero
2006	Ciwen Film & TV Production (Mainland China)	Huang Xiaoming, Liu Yifei, Wang Luoyong, Kong Lin	The Return of the Condor Heroes (2006 TV series)
2014	Yu Zheng Studio (Mainland China)	Chen Xiao, Michelle Chen, Zheng Guolin, Yang Mingna	The Romance of the Condor Heroes
TBA	Shanghai Tencent Penguin Film Culture Communication and Summerstar Media & Entertainment Group (Mainland China)	Tong Mengshi, Mao Xiaohui, Shao Bing, Gong Beibi	post-production

=== Comics ===
Asiapac Books acquired the rights to produce an illustrated version of the novel in 1995. The 18 volume comic series was illustrated by Wee Tian Beng and translated by Jean Lim with Jin Yong's approval. The lavishly illustrated series won the Prestigious Award in 1997 during the Asian Comics Conference held in South Korea. Notable deviations from the main story include funny strips that poke gentle fun at some of the story's events, in line with conventions of the comic book medium. The series was repackaged in 2021 and Asiapac produced a new limited collector's edition of the comic in both English and Chinese.

In 2002 ComicsOne published the first official English translation of Legendary Couple, a retelling of the novel. The comic series was illustrated by Wong Yuk-long while Jin Yong was credited as the writer.

=== Video games ===
In 1997, Softworld released a RPG based on the novel for MS-DOS. The game is only available in Chinese and covers the first half of the novel to the point where Yang Guo meets the Condor. In 2000, Interserv International Inc. published another video game adaptation using a 3D engine.

=== Music ===
Fu Tong Wong composed an eight-movement symphony Symphony: The Hero with Great Eagle based on the novel.
