= Xiaolongnü =

Fictional character in the novel The Return of the Condor Heroes by Jin Yong

- The Return of the Condor Heroes character
- Xiaolongnü in the 2021 mobile game The Legend of the Condor Heroes
- Created by: Jin Yong

In-universe information
- Gender: Female
- Affiliation: Ancient Tomb Sect
- Spouse: Yang Guo
- Descendant: Yellow Dress Maiden
- Masters: Lin Chaoying's apprentice; Zhou Botong
- Apprentice: Yang Guo

Xiaolongnü
- Traditional Chinese: 小龍女
- Simplified Chinese: 小龙女
- Literal meaning: Little Dragon Maiden
Transcriptions
Standard Mandarin
- Hanyu Pinyin: Xiǎolóngnǚ
Yue: Cantonese
- Jyutping: Siu^{2}-lung^{4}-neoi^{5}

Xiaolongnü (小龍女) or Little Dragon Maiden is the fictional female protagonist of the wuxia novel The Return of the Condor Heroes by Jin Yong. In the novel, her physical appearances is described as follows: "skin as white as snow, beautiful and elegant beyond convention and cannot be underestimated, but appears cold and indifferent". She trains the protagonist Yang Guo in martial arts, and they eventually fall in love.

== Name ==
In the novel, Xiaolongnü's guardians named her after the Chinese zodiac year in which she was born, the Year of the Dragon. Yang Guo, Granny Sun, and her martial arts master call her Long'er.

== Fictional character biography ==
Xiaolongnü was abandoned as an infant outside the Quanzhen Sect's base in the Zhongnan Mountains. As Quanzhen does not take in female members, they were unsure of what to do until a middle-aged Granny Sun appeared and took Xiaolongnü to the nearby Tomb of the Living Dead, where the Ancient Tomb Sect is based.

Xiaolongnü was raised and trained by the unnamed apprentice of Lin Chaoying, the founder of the Ancient Tomb Sect. By the time she was 14, she had already learnt everything she could from her master, except for the Jade Maiden Sutra because her master's understanding of it was very limited. Xiaolongnü became the Ancient Tomb Sect's leader after her master's death as her senior Li Mochou had been expelled from the sect.

Xiaolongnü meets Yang Guo for the first time when he unknowingly ventures into the tomb to escape from the bullies at the Quanzhen Sect. At first, Xiaolongnü tells Granny Sun to send Yang Guo back to Quanzhen and tell them not to mistreat the boy anymore. However, a heated exchange takes place between Granny Sun and the Quanzhen Sect, resulting in Granny Sun's death at the hands of Hao Datong, one of the "Seven Immortals of Quanzhen". Xiaolongnü appears at the critical moment, defeats Hao Datong, and saves Yang Guo. Before dying, Granny Sun makes Xiaolongnü promise to take care of Yang Guo as she hopes that both of them, being orphans, will have each other's company. Feeling guilty for causing Granny Sun's death, Hao Datong and the Quanzhen members allow Xiaolongnü to leave with Yang Guo.

Xiaolongnü takes Yang Guo as her apprentice, training him in all the skills she had learnt from her master. During this time, although they are master and apprentice in name, they develop a romantic relationship, and Yang Guo prefers to call her "Aunt" despite them having no blood relation. After leaving the tomb, they encounter numerous tests of their love before eventually marrying in the Quanzhen Sect's headquarters. They are separated for 16 years as the story progresses and ultimately reunited at the end.

== Martial arts and skills ==
Xiaolongnü learnt various skills from her master, including qinggong, the Jade Maiden Swordplay (玉女素心劍法), Fist of Beauties (美女拳法), and Palm of Infinity Web (天羅地網式). Later, together with Yang Guo, she learns the Jade Maiden Heart Sutra (玉女心經) and Jiuyin Zhenjing (九陰真經). At one point, she learns the Technique of Ambidexterity (雙手互搏) from Zhou Botong.

Besides these, Xiaolongnü wears a pair of white-silver gloves impervious to sharp weapons that allows her to grab and break enemies' weapons, and uses a long sash of gold bells for short- and long-range attacks by striking enemies' acupuncture points. She and Yang Guo also wield a pair of swords called the Gentleman and Lady Swords when using the Jade Maiden Swordplay and Quanzhen Swordplay. Xiaolongnü can also control the jade bees, a rare breed of bees, by playing the guqin, and using rhythmic whistles and honey. The bees' venom is coated onto needles made of heavy gold and steel, which Xiaolongnü throws as darts in combat.

== In adaptations ==
Notable actresses who have portrayed Xiaolongnü in films and television series include Nam Hung (1960–1961), Mary Jean Reimer (1983), Idy Chan (1983), Angela Pan (1984), Carman Lee (1995), Fann Wong (1998), Jacklyn Wu (1998), Joyce Luk (2001-2008), Liu Yifei (2006) and Michelle Chen (2014).
