= Qinggong =

Chinese martial arts technique

- Traditional Chinese: 輕功
- Simplified Chinese: 轻功
- Literal meaning: lightness skill
Transcriptions
Standard Mandarin
- Hanyu Pinyin: qīnggōng
- Wade–Giles: ch'ing^{1}-kung^{1}
- IPA: [tɕʰíŋ.kʊ́ŋ]
Yue: Cantonese
- Yale Romanization: hìng-gùng
- Jyutping: hing1-gung1

Qinggong (ching-kung) is a training technique for jumping off vertical surfaces from the Chinese martial arts. One way of training is to run up a slightly inclined ramp, gradually increasing the steepness of the incline until it is vertical.

== Etymology ==
The characters used for this skill are 輕功, where the meaning of the first character is 'light [in weight]; easy; soft; gentle' and the second means 'achievement; effort; skill; results'. It is sometimes translated as 'lightness skill'.

== Popular culture ==
The use of qinggong has been exaggerated in wuxia fiction, in which martial artists have the ability to move swiftly and lightly at superhuman speed, and perform gravity-defying moves such as running on water surfaces, traversing across rooftops, and even balancing on a stalk of grass. In some wuxia and martial arts films, qinggong stunts are simulated by actors and stunt performers suspending themselves from wires, earning the name of "wire fu".

Qinggong was taught at the Peking Opera School in the 20th century. The school's most notable students are the Seven Little Fortunes, including Sammo Hung and most famously Jackie Chan, providing a basis for their acrobatic stunt work in Hong Kong action cinema. In turn, this influenced the development of parkour in France.
