= Yang Guo =

Fictional character in the novel The Return of the Condor Heroes by Jin Yong

- The Return of the Condor Heroes character
- Yang Guo in the 2021 mobile game The Legend of the Condor Heroes
- Created by: Jin Yong

In-universe information
- Nicknames: "Condor Hero" (神雕俠); "Western Eccentric" (西狂)
- Gender: Male
- Affiliation: Ancient Tomb Sect
- Family: Yang Kang (father); Mu Nianci (mother); Ouyang Feng (godfather)
- Spouse: Xiaolongnü
- Descendant: Yellow Dress Maiden
- Sworn siblings: Cheng Ying; Lu Wushuang
- Masters: Zhao Zhijing; Xiaolongnü; Huang Rong; Hong Qigong; Huang Yaoshi; Ouyang Feng

Yang Guo
- Traditional Chinese: 楊過
- Simplified Chinese: 杨过
Transcriptions
Standard Mandarin
- Hanyu Pinyin: Yáng Guò
Yue: Cantonese
- Jyutping: Joeng^{4} Gwo^{3}

Gaizhi (courtesy name)
- Chinese: 改之
Transcriptions
Standard Mandarin
- Hanyu Pinyin: Gǎizhī
Yue: Cantonese
- Jyutping: Goi^{2}-zi^{1}

Yang Guo (楊過), courtesy name Gaizhi (改之), is the fictional protagonist of the wuxia novel The Return of the Condor Heroes by Jin Yong.

== Fictional character biography ==
Yang Guo's ancestor is Yang Zaixing, a Song dynasty general known for fighting in the Jin–Song wars. His father, Yang Kang, was the antagonist in The Legend of the Condor Heroes and a treacherous villain. His mother, Mu Nianci, was Yang Kang's lover and she had left Yang Kang after seeing how unrepentant he was despite already being pregnant with Yang Guo. Yang Guo's birth is briefly mentioned at the end of The Legend of the Condor Heroes when the protagonists Guo Jing and Huang Rong meet Mu Nianci shortly after she gave birth. Guo Jing named the boy "Guo" ("wrong / fault") with the courtesy name "Gaizhi" ("to correct") in the hope that the boy will redeem his family's honour.

Yang Guo becomes an orphan around the age of 11 after his mother dies. While roaming the wulin, he encounters Guo Jing and Huang Rong, who realise he is Yang Kang and Mu Nianci's son. The Guos then take him under their care, although Huang Rong is suspicious of him as she is worried he will grow up to be like his father. Huang Rong opposes Guo Jing's decision to teach the boy martial arts, so Yang Guo only learns poetry and the Confucian classics from them.

Guo Jing later takes Yang Guo to the Quanzhen Sect, where Yang Kang had initially been trained, hoping that they would be better able to train and guide Yang Guo in moral values and "orthodox" martial arts. Due to an earlier misunderstanding between Guo Jing and the Quanzhen Sect, some Quanzhen members pick on Yang Guo after Guo Jing leaves. Zhao Zhijing, Yang Guo's assigned master in Quanzhen, dislikes him and teaches him only the philosophical verses of Quanzhen martial arts.

Unable to stand the bullying, Yang Guo flees Quanzhen and wanders into a nearby tomb, where he is taken in by the Ancient Tomb Sect and eventually becomes Xiaolongnü's apprentice. During their time together, they develop a romantic relationship. When Yang Guo meets the Guos again later, they oppose his decision to marry Xiaolongnü since a romance between master and apprentice is considered taboo in the wulin. Yang Guo's impulsiveness and lack of reverence for other senior wulin members, compounded by a rebellious streak in him, leads to a heated quarrel between him and the wulin, after which he leaves with Xiaolongnü.

Although Yang Guo becomes an outcast of the wulin, he still respects the Guos and saves the Guo family from danger on various occasions. Throughout the story, he is separated from Xiaolongnü numerous times due to misunderstandings but they are always reunited later. During his adventures, Yang Guo also encounters some of the "Five Greats" – the five most powerful martial artists in the wulin – and learns martial arts from them before ultimately creating his own fighting style.

Yang Guo initially suspects that the Guos are responsible for his father's death and seeks revenge, but refrains from doing so as he is impressed with Guo Jing's heroism and wonders if he is mistaken about the Guos, then decides to investigate on his father's past. At one point, the Guos' elder daughter Guo Fu cuts off Yang Guo's right arm with a sword during a heated quarrel. Yang Guo flees and gets rescued by a giant eagle-like creature called the Condor. With the Condor's aid, he recovers, relearns martial arts to adapt to his disability, and uses his skills to fight injustice and help the poor, earning himself the nickname "Condor Hero".

After learning the truth about his father, Yang Guo realizes the futility of seeking vengeance since his father deserved his retribution for the harm he caused and changes his focus to redeem his family legacy. He eventually joins the Guos in defending the city of Xiangyang from Mongol invaders. At the end of the novel, he is reunited with Xiaolongnü, temporarily halts the Mongol invasion by killing Möngke Khan in battle, and becomes known as the "Western Eccentric" – one of the new "Five Greats" in the wulin.

== Martial arts and skills ==
Yang Guo's repertoire is an eclectic mix of the numerous martial arts and skills he had learnt from various masters throughout his life. In his childhood, he had learnt some martial arts from his mother Mu Nianci. At one point, he also met an insane Ouyang Feng, one of the "Five Greats", and learnt the Toad Skill (蛤蟆功), which he used on two occasions to protect himself from bullying.

In the Quanzhen Sect, he learnt only the philosophical verses of Quanzhen martial arts. After joining the Ancient Tomb Sect, he learnt various skills from Xiaolongnü, including qinggong, Fist of Beauties (美女拳法), Palm of Infinity Web (天羅地網式), Jade Maiden Swordplay (玉女素心劍法), and the Jade Maiden Heart Sutra (玉女心經). In the tomb, he and Xiaolongnü also partially learnt the Jiuyin Zhenjing from carvings on the stone walls.

While roaming the wulin, he meets Hong Qigong, another of the "Five Greats", who teaches him the Dog Beating Staff Technique (打狗棒法), a skill passed down only from the Beggar Clan's chief to the next. He also encounters Huang Rong's father Huang Yaoshi, who shares the same disdain for rules and customs as him, and learns the Finger Flicking Skill (彈指神通) and Jade Flute Swordplay (玉簫劍法).

After losing his right arm, Yang Guo meets the Condor, which leads him to the legacy left behind by the swordsman Dugu Qiubai. With the Condor's help, Yang Guo inherits Dugu Qiubai's Heavy Iron Sword, strengthens his neigong, and learns to use the sword to compensate for his disability. When he is separated from Xiaolongnü for the last time, he creates a new skill, the Melancholic Palms (黯然銷魂掌), which can rival Guo Jing's Eighteen Subduing Dragon Palms.

== In adaptations ==
Notable actors who have portrayed Yang Guo in films and television series include Patrick Tse (1960), Alexander Fu (1982), Leslie Cheung (1983), Andy Lau (1983), Louis Koo (1995), Christopher Lee (1998), Richie Ren (1998), Kevin So (2001-2008), Huang Xiaoming (2006) and Chen Xiao (2014).
