= List of The Legend of the Condor Heroes characters =

List of characters from the novel The Legend of the Condor Heroes by Jin Yong

The following is a list of characters from the wuxia novel The Legend of the Condor Heroes by Jin Yong. Some of these characters are fictionalised personas of, or are based on, actual historical figures, such as Wang Chongyang, Qiu Chuji, Duan Zhixing, Genghis Khan, and Jebe.

== Main characters ==
- Guo Jing (郭靖)
- Huang Rong (黃蓉) / Lotus Huang
- Yang Kang (楊康)
- Mu Nianci (穆念慈) / Mercy Mu

== Guo Jing and Yang Kang's parents ==
- Guo Xiaotian (郭嘯天) / Skyfury Guo is Guo Jing's father and a descendant of Guo Sheng. He made an agreement with Yang Tiexin for their children to become either sworn siblings (if they are of the same sex) or a married couple (if they are of opposite sexes). He is killed by Duan Tiande's men during the raid on Niu Family Village.
- Li Ping (李萍) / Lily Li is Guo Xiaotian's wife and Guo Jing's mother. After surviving the raid on the village, she is captured by Duan Tiande but manages to escape to Mongolia, where she settles down and gives birth to Guo Jing. Towards the end of the novel, she commits suicide to remind Guo Jing of his heritage when Genghis Khan tries to force Guo Jing to help him conquer the Song Empire.
- Yang Tiexin (楊鐵心) / Ironheart Yang is Yang Kang's father who specialises in using the Yang Family Spear (楊家槍). He survives the attack on the village, renames himself Mu Yi (穆易), and adopts Mu Nianci as his daughter. Although he is reunited with his family later, his son refuses to acknowledge him so he ultimately commits suicide with his wife when they are cornered by Wanyan Honglie's men.
- Bao Xiruo (包惜弱) / Charity Bao is Yang Tiexin's wife and Yang Kang's mother. A soft-hearted and empathetic person, she survives the raid on the village. Wanyan Honglie saves her, brings her back to the Jin Empire and marries her. However, she has remained faithful to Yang Tiexin all these years. Eventually, she commits suicide with her husband when they are cornered by Wanyan Honglie's men.

== Seven Freaks of Jiangnan ==
The "Seven Freaks of Jiangnan" (江南七怪) is a group of seven martial artists from Jiaxing who teach Guo Jing martial arts and Han Chinese culture. Ke Zhen'e was blinded many years ago in a fight against Mei Chaofeng and Chen Xuanfeng. Zhang Asheng is killed by Chen Xuanfeng while the rest except Ke Zhen'e are murdered by Ouyang Feng and Yang Kang later.

- Ke Zhen'e (柯鎮惡), nicknamed "Flying Bat" (飛天蝙蝠), is highly skilled in using the staff and dart-throwing even though he is blind.
- Zhu Cong (朱聰), nicknamed "Marvellous-Handed Scholar" (妙手書生), is the wisest among the seven. He specialises in thieving and pickpocketing.
- Han Baoju (韓寶駒) / Ryder Han, nicknamed "Horse King Deity" (馬王神), specialises in equestrianism.
- Nan Xiren (南希仁) / Woodcutter Nan the Merciful, nicknamed "Southern Hill Woodcutter" (南山樵子), is a shy individual who teaches Guo Jing to use the saber.
- Zhang Asheng (張阿生), nicknamed "Laughing Buddha" (笑彌陀), is a fat Buddhist monk and Han Xiaoying's lover. He is slain by Chen Xuanfeng.
- Quan Jinfa (全金發) / Gilden Quan the Prosperous, nicknamed "Hidden Hero of the Bustling Market" (鬧市俠隱), specialises in using the spear or lance.
- Han Xiaoying (韓小瑩) / Jade Han, nicknamed "Maiden of the Yue Sword" (越女劍), is Han Baoju's cousin, Zhang Asheng's lover, and the only woman among the seven. A descendant of the swordswoman Yuenü, she specialises in using the sword.

== Mongol Empire ==
- Temüjin (鐵木真) is an ambitious warlord who unites all the Mongol tribes under his rule and becomes known as Genghis Khan (成吉思汗). Guo Jing grows up in Mongolia under the care of the Khan, who treats him like a son. Towards the end of the novel, he tries to force Guo Jing to help him conquer the Song Empire, but Guo Jing refuses and flees Mongolia. At the end of the novel, the dying Khan reconciles with Guo Jing and debates with him about what makes a person a hero.
- Jochi (朮赤), Chagatai (察合台) and Ögedei (窩闊台) are Genghis Khan's first three sons.
- Tolui (拖雷) is Genghis Khan's fourth son who becomes anda (sworn brothers) with Guo Jing in their childhood.
- Huazheng (華箏) is Genghis Khan's daughter. She was Guo Jing's childhood playmate and has a crush on him but Guo regards her as a younger sister. Her father betroths her to Guo but they are not married eventually. When she discovers that Guo is planning to disobey her father's order to attack the Song Empire, she secretly reports Guo to her father in the hope that Guo will be forced to remain in Mongolia. However, in doing so, she unknowingly brings big trouble to Guo and indirectly causes his mother to commit suicide. Overwhelmed by guilt over what happened to Guo's mother, she leaves home and became a recluse for the rest of her life. Before leaving, she warns Guo that the Mongols are planning to attack Xiangyang.
- Jebe (哲別) is an expert archer from a rival tribe who later becomes one of Genghis Khan's most trusted men. He teaches Guo Jing archery, and Guo impresses everyone when he once shoots down two eagles in the sky with a single arrow.
- Muqali (木華黎), Tchila'un (赤老溫), Huduhu (忽都虎) and Jelme (者勒米) and Boroqul (博爾忽) are Genghis Khan's followers. Some of them show up to save Hong Qigong, Guo Jing, Huang Rong, Huazheng and others when they were trapped by Yang Kang and Ouyang Feng.
- Jamukha (札木合) is Genghis Khan's sworn brother and ally who becomes his rival later.
- Ong Khan (王罕) is a former ally of Genghis Khan and Jamukha who sides with Jamukha later in the war between Genghis Khan and Jamukha.
- Senggum (桑昆) is Ong Khan's son.
- Dushi (都史) is Senggum's son and Huazheng's original fiancé.

== Quanzhen Sect ==
- Wang Chongyang (王重陽), nicknamed "Central Divine" (中神通), was the founder of the Quanzhen Sect. Regarded as the most powerful martial artist in the wulin of his time, he was one of the "Five Greats" and had won the Jiuyin Zhenjing as his prize.
- Zhou Botong (周伯通), nicknamed "Old Imp" (老頑童) for his childish behaviour despite his old age, is Wang Chongyang's junior and a formidable martial artist.
- The "Seven Immortals of Quanzhen" (全真七子) are Wang Chongyang's seven apprentices who lead Quanzhen after their master's death.
  - Ma Yu (馬鈺), also known as Danyangzi (丹陽子) / Scarlet Sun, teaches Guo Jing basic Quanzhen neigong.
  - Tan Chuduan (譚處端), also known as Changzhenzi (長真子) / Eternal Truth, is killed by Ouyang Feng in a fight.
  - Liu Chuxuan (劉處玄) is also known as Changshengzi (長生子) / Eternal Life.
  - Qiu Chuji (丘處機), also known as Changchunzi (長春子) / Eternal Spring, befriends the Guo and Yang families and becomes Yang Kang's martial arts master later.
  - Wang Chuyi (王處一), also known as Yuyangzi (玉陽子) / Jade Sun, befriends Guo Jing after hearing that Guo has learnt Quanzhen neigong from Ma Yu before. Guo helps him recover when he is injured by Lingzhi Shangren.
  - Hao Datong (郝大通) is also known as Guangningzi (廣寧子) / Infinite Peace.
  - Sun Bu'er (孫不二) is also known as Qingjing Sanren (清靜散人) / Sage of Tranquility.
- Yin Zhiping (尹志平) / Harmony Yin is one of Qiu Chuji's apprentices. He goes to Mongolia to remind Guo Jing of his scheduled match with Yang Kang.
- Cheng Yaojia (程瑤迦) / Emerald Cheng is Sun Bu'er's apprentice. At one point, she is almost raped by Ouyang Ke, but Guo Jing and Huang Rong save her. She was infatuated with Guo Jing and decide to look for him in Niu Family Village where she eventually falls in love and marries Lu Guanying.

== Peach Blossom Island ==
- Huang Yaoshi (黃藥師) / Apothecary Huang, nicknamed "Eastern Heretic" (東邪), is the master of Peach Blossom Island and one of the "Five Greats".
- Feng Heng (馮衡) was Huang Yaoshi's wife and Huang Rong's mother who died shortly after giving birth to Huang Rong. She had eidetic memory and had memorised the Jiuyin Zhenjing after reading it once.
- Qu Lingfeng (曲靈風) / Tempest Qu is Huang Yaoshi's first apprentice. He first appears as Qu San (曲三), a crippled neighbour of Guo Xiaotian and Yang Tiexin. In the day, he pretends to run the inn in Niu Family Village. At night, he disguises himself and steals treasures from the palace. Guo and Yang discover his secret after witnessing him fighting with palace guards. He is killed by a palace guard and his skeleton is discovered years later by Guo Jing and Huang Rong in a secret chamber in the inn.
- The "Twin Killers in the Dark Wind" (黑風雙煞) are Huang Yaoshi's second and third apprentices. They eloped, stole their master's copy of the Jiuyin Zhenjing, and fled from Peach Blossom Island. They learn two skills derived from an "unorthodox" interpretation of the manual: the "Nine Yin White Bone Claw" (九陰白骨爪) and the "Heart-Shattering Palm" (摧心掌). The couple are known for committing heinous crimes and are highly feared in the wulin. They are:
  - Chen Xuanfeng (陳玄風) / Hurricane Chen is nicknamed "Copper Corpse" (銅屍). He fights with the "Seven Freaks of Jiangnan" and tries to hold a six-year-old Guo Jing hostage but the boy instinctively stabs him with a dagger and kills him.
  - Mei Chaofeng (梅超風) / Cyclone Mei was originally named Mei Ruohua (梅若華) and nicknamed "Iron Corpse" (鐵屍). After she is blinded by Ke Zhen'e in a fight, she manages to escape and improve her fighting skills with the goal of avenging her husband. Later, she meets Huang Yaoshi, who forgives her for her betrayal and tells her to find his other four apprentices. She is eventually killed by Ouyang Feng.
- Lu Chengfeng (陸乘風) / Zephyr Lu is Huang Yaoshi's fourth apprentice who inherits his master's knowledge of medicine and strategic formations. After his banishment from Peach Blossom Island, he settled in a manor near Lake Tai and became the leader of a pirate gang who robs the rich and corrupt to help the poor. He moves to Dasheng Pass with his family and followers after his home is destroyed by Ouyang Feng, and eventually dies of natural causes.
- Wu Mianfeng (武眠風) / Galeforce Wu was Huang Yaoshi's fifth apprentice who died of illness before the events of the novel take place.
- Feng Mofeng (馮默風) / Doldrum Feng is Huang Yaoshi's sixth apprentice.
- Shagu (傻姑) is Qu Lingfeng's intellectually disabled daughter whom Guo Jing and Huang Rong encounter at the inn in Niu Family Village. Later, after Huang Yaoshi learns that she is Qu Lingfeng's daughter, he takes her as a grand-apprentice.
- Lu Guanying (陸冠英) / Laurel Lu is Lu Chengfeng's son. His father refuses to teach him martial arts without permission from Huang Yaoshi, so he learns from Reverend Kumu instead. He marries Cheng Yaojia after falling in love with her on first sight, with Huang Yaoshi as the matchmaker.

== Beggar Clan ==
- Hong Qigong (洪七公) / Count Seven Hong, nicknamed "Northern Beggar" (北丐), is the chief of the Beggar Clan and one of the "Five Greats".
- Lu Youjiao (魯有腳) / Surefoot Lu is a clan elder who befriends Guo Jing and Huang Rong.
- Elder Peng (彭長老) is a lecherous fiend who lusts for Mu Nianci. He betrays the clan and joins the Mongols eventually.
- Elder Jian (簡長老)
- Elder Liang (梁長老)
- Li Sheng (黎生) is a brave clan member who fights with Ouyang Ke to save the women kidnapped by Ouyang Ke. Guo Jing and Huang Rong show up to help him and he recognises them as Hong Qigong's apprentices. He refuses to kill Guo and Huang when Yang Kang orders him to do so, and chooses to commit suicide instead.
- Yu Zhaoxing (余兆興)

== Ouyang family ==
- Ouyang Feng (歐陽鋒) / Viper Ouyang, nicknamed "Western Venom" (西毒), is the master of a manor on Mount White Camel (白駝山) in the Western Regions and one of the "Five Greats".
- Ouyang Ke (歐陽克) / Gallant Ouyang is Ouyang Feng's nephew who later turns out to be Ouyang Feng's illegitimate son. A lecherous fiend, he enjoys preying on young and beautiful maidens, especially Huang Rong, Mu Nianci and Cheng Yaojia. He initially wants Guo Jing's Ferghana horse and later becomes Guo's rival in vying for Huang Rong's affection. His attempts on Huang Rong have ended up in failure and shame for himself every time; at one point, his legs are crushed by a boulder in a booby trap set by Huang Rong. He is eventually murdered by Yang Kang after attempting to molest Mu Nianci and Cheng Yaojia.

== Wanyan Honglie and associates ==
- Wanyan Honglie (完顏洪烈) is the sixth prince of the Jin Empire who meets Bao Xiruo by chance and falls in love with her. He then bribes Duan Tiande to lead his men to raid Niu Family Village so that he can pretend to rescue Bao Xiruo. After succeeding, he marries Bao Xiruo and raises her son, Yang Kang, as his own. He is obsessed with finding the Book of Wumu as he intends to use the knowledge acquired from the book to eliminate the Jin Empire's enemies. His plans are foiled by Guo Jing and Huang Rong, who obtain the book instead. Towards the end of the novel, after Yang Kang's death he travels to Samarkand to form an alliance between the Jin Empire and Khwarazmian Empire as part of a last-ditch effort to counter the Mongols, where he is ultimately captured by Guo Jing and executed.
- Wanyan Hongxi (完顏洪熙) is Wanyan Honglie's brother who travels to Mongolia to meet Genghis Khan.
- Sha Tongtian (沙通天) / Hector Sha is nicknamed "Devil's Gate Dragon King" (鬼門龍王). His left arm is amputated by Peng Lianhu after being infected with poison from a dying Yang Kang. He betrays Wanyan Honglie at the end of the novel.
- Shen Qinggang (沈青剛), Wu Qinglie (吳青烈), Ma Qingxiong (馬青雄), and Qian Qingjian (錢青健), collectively nicknamed "Four Devils of the Yellow River" (黃河四鬼), are Sha Tongtian's apprentices.
- Hou Tonghai (侯通海) / Browbeater Hou, nicknamed "Three Headed Dragon" (三頭蛟), is Sha Tongtian's inept junior.
- Liang Ziweng (梁子翁) / Graybeard Liang, nicknamed "Ginseng Immortal Old Demon" (參仙老怪), is an eccentric martial artist from the Changbai Mountains. 20 years ago, he attempted to rape many women but they were saved by Hong Qigong and he suffered a humiliating defeat at Hong's hands. He rears a snake for an experiment, but the snake ends up being killed by Guo Jing, who drinks its blood in the process. Since then, Liang has been stalking Guo and wanting to suck his blood, believing that it will make him more powerful. Hong Qigong shows up to help Guo, and Liang shuns away in fear when he recognises Hong. At the end of the novel, Liang loses his footing in a final attempt to kill Guo at Mount Hua and falls to his death.
- Lingzhi Shangren (靈智上人) is a Tibetan monk who poisons Wang Chuyi in a fight.
- Peng Lianhu (彭連虎) / Tiger Peng, nicknamed "Butcher of a Thousand Hands" (千手人屠), is a notorious mass murderer who poisons Ma Yu in a fight.

== Dali Kingdom ==
- Reverend Yideng (一燈大師) / Reverend Sole Light, nicknamed "Southern Emperor" (南帝), is the former ruler of the Dali Kingdom and one of the "Five Greats". Formerly known as Duan Zhixing (段智興), he has abdicated and become a Buddhist monk.
- Liu Ying (劉瑛) / Madam Ying (瑛姑) was Duan Zhixing's concubine when he was still the ruler of Dali. However, he neglected her due to his obsession with martial arts, so she had a secret affair with Zhou Botong and bore him a son. After the infant was severely injured by a masked attacker (Qiu Qianren), she pleaded with Duan to save her son but he refused and the infant died. Since then, she has been leading a reclusive life in the Black Swamp while plotting revenge on Duan and searching for Zhou Botong and her son's killer. During this time, she self-learnt mathematics and martial arts and has become a formidable fighter.
- Chu Dongshan (褚東山), Zhang Shaoshou (張少守), Wu Santong (武三通), and Zhu Ziliu (朱子柳) are Yideng's aides who formerly held high civil/military positions in the Dali government.
- The Sindhu Monk (天竺僧人) is Yideng's junior, and an expert in medicine and healing. He translates for Guo Jing and Huang Rong the part of the Jiuyin Zhenjing that was written in Sanskrit.

== Iron Palm Clan ==
- Qiu Qianren (裘千仞) is the leader of the Iron Palm Clan (鐵掌幫) and an apprentice of Shangguan Jiannan, a subordinate of the Song general Han Shizhong. He is one of the more powerful fighters in the wulin after the "Five Greats", and is nicknamed "Iron Palm Water Glider" (鐵掌水上飄) for his prowess in iron palm and qinggong. He committed various heinous crimes, including killing Liu Ying's infant son and collaborating with Jin soldiers to terrorise Song citizens. After he nearly dies on Mount Hua, he is saved by Yideng and feels so remorseful for his past deeds that he repents. He is renamed Ci'en (慈恩) and becomes Yideng's apprentice.
- Qiu Qianzhang (裘千丈) is Qiu Qianren's twin brother. He is inferior to his brother in martial arts, and relies on impersonating his brother to deceive others for a living. He falls to his death from Iron Palm Peak.
- Yashaogong (啞艄公)
- Chief Qiao (喬寨主), Chief He (賀寨主) and Chief Shi (石寨主) are three stronghold chiefs in the clan.

== Song Empire ==
- Huang Chang (黃裳) was a book transcriber who lived in the 12th century. Emperor Huizong tasked him with transcribing a collection of 5,481 volumes of Taoist texts. Huang Chang approached his task meticulously and gradually became well-versed in the Taoist classics, which provided him with a strong foundation for mastering powerful martial arts based on Taoist philosophy. Later, acting on Emperor Huizong's order, Huang Chang led imperial forces to attack the Ming Cult, killed many martial arts experts, and made several enemies in the wulin. His enemies killed his family in revenge. Huang Chang went into hiding for 40 years and spent his time learning martial arts and thinking of ways to counter his enemies' moves. By the time he was done, his enemies were already dead so he lost his chance to avenge his family. By then, he realised that his days were numbered, so he spent his last days compiling his knowledge and experiences into a two-volume martial arts manual, the Jiuyin Zhenjing. After his death, the Jiuyin Zhenjing became the most coveted object in the wulin for around a century until Wang Chongyang won the first martial arts contest on Mount Hua and claimed the manual as his prize.
- Duan Tiande (段天德) / Justice Duan is a military officer who leads his men to kill Guo Xiaotian and Yang Tiexin. He is actually acting on Wanyan Honglie's orders, as part of Wanyan's plan to win Bao Xiruo's affection. He later reveals the truth unsuspectingly while being held captive in Guiyun Manor, and is eventually slain by Yang Kang.
- Li Quan (李全) is the leader of the local militia in Qingzhou. At the end of the novel, Guo Jing and Huang Rong help him and his men avert a Mongol invasion.
- Yang Miaozhen (楊妙真) is Li Quan's wife and a highly-skilled spear-fighter.
- Lü Wende (呂文德) is the commander of Xiangyang's military forces. Guo Jing and Huang Rong warn him about the Mongol invasion at the end of the novel.
- Shi Yanming (石彦明) was a high-ranking palace guard. He and Qu Lingfeng killed each other in a fight in the secret chamber in Qu's inn. His skeleton is discovered many years later by Guo Jing and Huang Rong.
- Wang Daoqian (王道乾) was an official in the Ministry of War. He was killed by Qiu Chuji after the latter discovered his attempt to trade secrets with Wanyan Honglie.
- Jiang Wen (姜文) is the magistrate of Xiushui County.
- Shi Miyuan (史彌遠)
- Ge Yuncong (蓋運聰) is the prefect of Jiaxing.
- Han Tuozhou (韓侂冑)
- Tang Zude (湯祖德)

== Xianxia Sect ==
- Reverend Kumu (枯木大師) / Abbot Withered Wood is the abbot of Yunqi Temple (雲棲寺) and a member of the Xianxia Sect (仙霞派). He is Duan Tiande's uncle and Lu Guanying's martial arts master. Duan lies to him that Qiu Chuji is a murderous villain after his life. Kumu believes his nephew and enlists the help of the "Seven Freaks of Jiangnan" to fight Qiu, resulting in a big misunderstanding.
- Reverend Jiaomu (焦木大師) / Reverend Scorched Wood died incidentally during a fight between Qiu Chuji and the "Seven Freaks of Jiangnan".

== Others ==
- Ala ad-Din Muhammad II (阿拉烏丁·摩訶末) is the ruler of the Khwarazmian Empire. He dies of pleurisy after his empire falls to the Mongols.
