= The Legend of the Condor Heroes (1988 TV series) =

1988 Taiwanese TV series

- Promotional poster from CTV featuring Howie Huang and Idy Chan as Guo Jing and Huang Rong respectively
- 射鵰英雄傳
- Genre: Wuxia
- Based on: The Legend of the Condor Heroes by Jin Yong
- Directed by: Li Chao-yung; Wang Chi-sheng
- Starring: Howie Huang; Idy Chan
- Country of origin: Taiwan
- Original language: Mandarin
- No. of episodes: 36

Production
- Producers: Chou Yu; Li Chao-yung
- Production location: Taiwan
- Running time: ≈45 minutes per episode
- Production company: CTV

Original release
- Network: CTV
- Release: May 1, 1988

Logo of Part 2

The Legend of the Condor Heroes (射鵰英雄傳) is a two-part Taiwanese wuxia television series adapted from the novel of the same title by Jin Yong. The series was first broadcast on CTV in Taiwan in 1988.

== Cast ==
- Howie Huang as Guo Jing
- Idy Chan as Huang Rong / Feng Heng
- Poon Wang-ban as Yang Kang
- Chiu Shu-yi as Mu Nianci
- Lee I-min as Huang Yaoshi
- Lung Tien-hsiang as Ouyang Feng
- Chiang Sheng as Hong Qigong
- Lung Kuan-wu as Zhou Botong
- Ke Wei-chia as Ouyang Ke
- Chen Li-hua as Mei Chaofeng
- Yu Kuo-tong as Chen Xuanfeng
- Hsieh Ping-nan as Wanyan Honglie
- Yang Yuen-chang as Qiu Chuji
- Liu Yu-ping as Li Ping
- Hsiang Yun-peng as Yang Tiexin
- Lin Hsiu-chun as Bao Xiruo
- Fan Jih-hsing as Duan Zhixing
- Li Chi-chian as Genghis Khan
- Hsian Huan-chen as Huazheng
- Ting Hua-chung as Tolui
- Wei Hung as Jebe
- Huang Kuan-hsiung as Ma Yu
- Chiang Ying as Wang Chuyi
- Mao Ching-shun as Ke Zhen'e
- Ting Yang-kuo as Zhu Cong
- Hsu Jo-hua as Han Xiaoying
- Tang Fu-hsiung as Liang Ziweng
- Peng Yu-lan as Liu Ying
- Hsu Chia-jung as Wang Chongyang
- Li Lung-jin as Lu Chengfeng
- Liang Xiushen as Yue Fei
