= The Legend of the Condor Heroes (1994 TV series) =

1994 Hong Kong TV series

- DVD cover art
- 射鵰英雄傳
- Genre: Wuxia
- Based on: The Legend of the Condor Heroes by Jin Yong
- Screenplay by: Wong Kwok-fai
- Directed by: Leung Tak-wah; Yuen Ying-ming; Lam Kin-lung; Yun Wai-yee; Kong Kam-hung; Lau Kwok-ho; Lam Dik-on
- Starring: Julian Cheung; Athena Chu; Gallen Lo; Emily Kwan
- Theme music composer: Joseph Koo; Hung King-fai
- Opening theme: "Unmatched Ultimate Moves" (絕世絕招) by Julian Cheung and Jacklyn Wu
- Ending theme: "Hard-to-Come-by Muddleheadedness" (難得糊塗) by Julian Cheung
- Country of origin: Hong Kong
- Original language: Cantonese
- No. of episodes: 35

Production
- Executive producer: Lee Tim-shing
- Production location: Hong Kong
- Running time: ≈45 minutes per episode
- Production company: TVB

Original release
- Network: TVB Jade
- Release: 3 October – 2 December 1994

Related
- The Condor Heroes 95 (1995)

The Legend of the Condor Heroes (射鵰英雄傳) is a Hong Kong wuxia television series adapted from the novel of the same title by Jin Yong. Starring Julian Cheung, Athena Chu, Gallen Lo and Emily Kwan, the series was first broadcast on TVB Jade in 1994.

Compared to the similar 1983 TV series, the series seems "inferior" in every way. First of all, the series has only about 35 episodes, so production costs are likely low. (Some behind-the-scenes footage had to be recorded in the studio.) The character's creation and success were overshadowed by the 1983 version. Despite this, the 1994 version still achieved good results, with a rating of 32 points, ranking third among the highest-rated TVB programmes of that year.

== Cast ==
- Julian Cheung as Guo Jing
  - Chu Wai-lin as Guo Jing (child)
- Athena Chu as Huang Rong
- Gallen Lo as Yang Kang
- Emily Kwan as Mu Nianci
- Lau Dan as Hong Qigong
- Felix Lok as Huang Yaoshi
- Wayne Lai as Zhou Botong
- Chu Tit-wo as Ouyang Feng
- Newton Lai as Yideng
- Dominic Lam as Yang Tiexin
- Savio Tsang as Guo Xiaotian
- Iwanbeo Leung as Bao Xiruo
- Ng Lai-ju as Li Ping
- Wong Wai as Wanyan Honglie
- Lau Kong as Genghis Khan
- Ben Wong as Tolui
  - Chor Kin-ban as Tolui (child)
- Chan Pui-san as Huazheng
  - Chor See-pui as Huazheng (child)
- Poon Man-bak as Jochi
- Ho Kam-ling as Chagatai
- Doi Siu-man as Ogodei
- Ho Ho-yuen as Jebe
- Lee Wai-man as Bo'orchu
- Cheung Hung-wai as Boroqul
- Lee Wong-sang as Muqali
- Tsui Bo-hin as Chilaun
- Lau Kwai-fong as Börte
- Leung Siu-tik as Sangkun
- Chun Hung as Jamukha
- Tam Yat-ching as Wang Khan
- Wong Wai-tak as Dushi
  - Chan Chi-ho as Dushi (child)
- Mak Tsui-han as Mei Chaofeng
- Joe Ma as Chen Xuanfeng
- Lam Sheung-mou as Qiu Chuji
- Kong Chor-fai as Ma Yu
- Chan Wing-chun as Wang Chuyi
- Yu Mo-lin as Sun Bu'er
- Gordon Lam as Yin Zhiping
- Leung Yam-kei as Liu Chuxuan
- Yip Chan-wah as Tan Chuduan
- Law Wai as Hao Datong
- Kwok Tak-shun as Wang Chongyang
- Kong Ngai as Ke Zhen'e
- Ngai Wai as Zhu Cong
- Wong Tin-chak as Han Baoju
- Cheng Kah-sang as Nan Xiren
- Bok Kwan as Quan Jinfa
- Lee Yiu-king as Zhang Asheng
- Chan On-ying as Han Xiaoying
- Lam Wai as Ouyang Ke
- Kit Chan as Shagu
- Cheung Man-shui as Yinggu
- Hung Chiu-fung as Qiu Qianren
- Kwan Ching as Wanyan Hongxi
- Ho Pik-kin as Jiaomu
- Chan Jui as Cheng Yaojia
- Fong Kit as Lu Chengfeng
- Kwok Ching-hung as Lu Guanying
- Luk Ying-hong as Qu Lingfeng
- Kiu Hung as Hou Tonghai
- Chan Tik-hak as Sha Tongtian
- Tang Yuk-wing as Liang Ziweng
- Mak Tsi-wan as Peng Lianhu
- Cho Kai as Lingzhi Shangren
- Chan Min-leung as Lu Youjiao
- Lee Hoi-sang as Elder Peng
- Yu Tin-wai as Elder Jian
- Sit Chun-kei as Elder Liang
- Wong Yat-fei as Duan Tiande
- Yoe Biu as Shen Qinggang
- Wong Wai-leung as Qian Qingjian
- Wong Wai-lam as Ma Qingxiong
- Wong Tsung-chi as Wu Qinglie
- Wong Sing-sheung as Wang Daoqian
- Lui Gim-kwong as Gai Yuncong
- Gan Mun-tak as the Sindhu Monk
- Kwok Cheuk-wah as Chu Dongshan
- Wong Man-biu as Zhang Shaoshou
- Siu Cheuk-yiu as Wu Santong
- Lam Kim-fung as Zhu Ziliu

== Reception ==
Although viewership ratings did not exceed the 1983 version, this series had an average viewership rating of 32 points.

Before: Fate of the Last Empire: May 6	TVB Jade First line series 1994; The Legend of the Condor Heroes; October 3 - December 2	Next: Love Cycle; December 5 -
