= Legends of the Condor Heroes: The Gallants =

2025 Chinese film by Tsui Hark

- Theatrical release poster
- Simplified Chinese: 射雕英雄传：侠之大者
- Traditional Chinese: 射鵰英雄傳：俠之大者
- Directed by: Tsui Hark
- Written by: Tsui Hark; Song Xuan
- Based on: The Legend of the Condor Heroes by Jin Yong
- Produced by: Nansun Shi; Tsui Hark
- Starring: Xiao Zhan; Sabrina Zhuang
- Cinematography: Gao Hu
- Edited by: Lee Moon-ho
- Music by: Li Ye; Henry Lai
- Production companies: China Film Co., Ltd.; HG Entertainment; Lian Ray Pictures; Film Workshop
- Distributed by: China Film Group Corporation; Sony Pictures Releasing International
- Release date: 29 January 2025
- Country: China
- Languages: Mandarin; Mongolian
- Box office: ¥687 million ($100.2 million)

Legends of the Condor Heroes: The Gallants (Chinese: 射雕英雄传：侠之大者), also known as Legend of the Condor Heroes, is a 2025 Chinese historical martial arts film directed, produced and co-written by Tsui Hark. It stars Xiao Zhan and Sabrina Zhuang, and is based on chapters 34 through 40 of Jin Yong's wuxia novel The Legend of the Condor Heroes. It is one of multiple Tsui Hark productions based on Jin Yong's novels, following 1990's The Swordsman and 1992's Swordsman II.

The film was released in mainland China on 29 January 2025 (Chinese New Year).

== Plot ==
The film is about the fictional martial artist Guo Jing during the Southern Song dynasty which was established after the Jingkang Incident.

While war rages between the Mongols and the Jin Dynasty, Guo Jing (Xiao Zhan) searches for Huang Rong (Zhuang Dafei), a woman he met during his two-year journey to the Middle Land to acquire martial arts skills from the Seven Freaks of Jiangnan. It was she who led him to a better master than his previous ones, Hong Qigong (Hu Jun) of the Five Greats, where he learned the powerful martial art Eighteen Dragon(-Subduing) Palms. Once, Huang Rong was seriously injured, and Guo Jing carried her on his back to seek Duan Zhixing (Wu Hsing-kuo). There, he learned the healing techniques of the Novem Scripture. When he accompanied her to her home at Peach Blossom Island, one day he found most of his former masters murdered. Since they had warned him about Huang Rong's father, Huang Yaoshi, he believed him responsible for their deaths and subsequently left her.

Later, Huang Rong is captured by the Jin-loyal martial arts master Ouyang Feng (Tony Leung Ka-fai) and his men. In order to become the best martial artist in the world he seeks the Novem Scripture, which she and Guo Jing had obtained. Huang Rong uses a trick to sow discord among them. Thus, while Ouyang Feng is preoccupied with his own men, she manages to cut her restraints using a stone and escapes by leaping into the river.

At the same time, Guo Jing has realized his mistake of shunning Huang Rong and leaves small pinwheels as clues for her to follow him. While resting by a river, he overhears a man speaking to a group of Mongols. The man, one of Ouyang Feng's followers, reveals that he has poisoned the river and will only provide the antidote if they obey him. Recognizing his sworn brother, Tolui (Alan Aruna), among the suffering Mongols, Guo Jing intervenes, defeats the enemy, and heals the poisoned victims using the martial arts technique he has learned.

Huang Rong tries to escape Ouyang Feng and his men in the bustling streets of a town. The chaos of a sudden skirmish between Ouyang Feng's group and a band of soldiers provides her with an opportunity to flee.

Tolui and a high-ranking soldier urge Guo Jing to return with them to the Mongol camp, at least to reunite with his mother, who has waited two years for his return. Upon arrival, he is greeted warmly by the soldiers, his likewise returning adoptive father Genghis Khan (Baya'ertu), and his mother Li Ping (Ada Choi).

Meanwhile, Huang Rong discovers one of the pinwheels and a mark on a stone pointing her toward Guo Jing's whereabouts. As she rides across the grasslands, she is once again pursued by Ouyang Feng's men. However, she is rescued by a group of women led by Mongol princess Hua Zheng (Wenxin Zhang). They take her to the Mongolian camp and tend to her wounds. Upon learning of Guo Jing's return, Hua Zheng excitedly tells Huang Rong that she is betrothed to him by her father, leaving the latter heartbroken.

Inside his mother's tent, Guo Jing discusses her wish for him to return to the Middle Land and defend their homeland against invaders. While he prays for his late father, Hua Zheng bursts in excitedly, but he angrily orders her to wait outside. Later, as they go for a ride, she mentions their upcoming marriage, but Guo Jing tells her he never truly intended to marry her. He explains that during his time in the Middle Land, he met someone who taught him what it means to truly love.

Enraged, Hua Zheng storms back to her tent, where she finds Huang Rong preparing to leave. Furious, she vows to find and behead the woman who has stolen Guo Jing's heart, unaware that she is speaking to her.

That evening, as Guo Jing demonstrates his martial arts skills before the entire camp, intruders infiltrate the area - it is Ouyang Feng and his men. He interrupts the brewing conflict between Huang Rong and Hua Zheng, the latter having discovered her identity. In a surprising move, Huang Rong saves the princess' life by handing Ouyang Feng a fake copy of the Novem Scripture. Shortly after, she quietly leaves the camp, unwilling to stand in the way of Guo Jing's betrothal, despite Hua Zheng assuring her that she will accept his choice.

Following another battle between the Mongols and the attacking Jin forces, Genghis Khan decides to march on the Jin capital. Since the Song Dynasty refuses to allow him passage through their territory, he is prepared to engage them in war as well. Knowing the area, Guo Jing is to be ordered to lead the Mongol army.

However, having left the camp in search of Huang Rong directly after the battle with the Jin, Guo Jing learns from a Song soldier that the Mongols are about to attack. He rushes back to the Mongol camp and refuses to lead the attack against the land where he was born. As a result, he is sentenced to execution. Only Tolui's pleas save him, but he and his mother are forbidden from leaving the camp. When Guo Jing goes to fetch his mother and escape, she takes her own life to avoid becoming a burden, believing his duty to defend their homeland is more important. With Hua Zheng's help, Guo Jing manages to flee. After burying his mother, he finally reunites with Huang Rong, and together they pledge to aid the Song in defending their border city.

Before the Mongols launch their attack on the Songs border town, Ouyang Feng appears. Driven insane by training with the fake manual, he unleashes his enhanced martial arts on the Mongols, causing destruction. Fearing that he might pose a threat to both sides, Guo Jing intervenes to protect his former allies, leading to an intense martial arts battle between him and Ouyang Feng. In the end, Guo Jing triumphs and saves Genghis Khan. Riding to the front of the Mongol army, Guo Jing boldly declares that they will have to go through him to conquer the city. Genghis Khan calls him for a final conversation. In a heartfelt speech about heroism and the responsibility of protecting one's own people instead of conquering others, Guo Jing convinces him to retreat: saving the Song city from destruction. However, knowing that the Khan's family might lead the future invasions, Guo Jing chooses to remain in the city to train soldiers.

== Cast ==
- Xiao Zhan as Guo Jing
- Sabrina Zhuang as Huang Rong
- Tony Leung Ka-fai as Ouyang Feng
- Zhang Wenxin as Hua Zheng
- Baya'ertu as Genghis Khan
- Alan Aruna as Tolui
- Ada Choi as Li Ping
- Hu Jun as Hong Qigong
- Wu Hsing-kuo as Duan Zhixing (Monk Sole Light)
- Li Chen as Guo Xiaotian

== Production ==
Principal photography for the film began in July 2023. In August, shooting moved to Xanadu Studios (上都影视城) in Plain Blue Banner, Xilingol League, Inner Mongolia.

== Release ==
On 15 November 2024, it was announced that the film would be released on 29 January 2025 (Chinese New Year) in China, and the first trailer was released. On 23 December 2024, an official trailer was released.

Sony Pictures International Productions distributed the film internationally, releasing it in Malaysia, Singapore, Thailand, Australia and New Zealand on 20 February, the United States on 21 February, and Indonesia on 26 February. The film also received a theatrical release in several cities in France.

The film was released on Chinese streaming services Tencent Video, iQIYI, Youku, and Mango TV on 11 April 2025.

== Reception ==
=== Box office ===
In the days prior to its release, Legends of the Condor Heroes: The Gallants was leading in ticket sales among 2025's Chinese New Year films.

The film earned US$35.6 million on its opening day, ultimately grossing US$93.20 million, less than Maoyan's projected US$113 million. The movie became the highest-grossing wuxia movie in Chinese cinema, surpassing Detective Dee: The Four Heavenly Kings (2018), also directed by Tsui.

After the film was released in Thailand, it was very popular. Not only did it beat Captain America: Brave New World in the first week, it also won the Thai box office championship for two consecutive weeks. It is the first Chinese-language film in nearly 20 years to win the box office championship for two consecutive weeks. According to reports, the box office revenue of this film in Thailand has reached 21.9 million baht (approximately HK$5.057 million), surpassing the cumulative record of 16.39 million baht (approximately HK$3.7847 million) of "Ip Man 4" many years ago.

=== Critical response ===
The film received mixed reviews from critics. Writing for RogerEbert.com, Simon Abrams gave it two and a half out of four stars, saying, "Audience members may be off-put by the inflexible cadences and rhythms of Legend of the Condor Heroes: The Gallants, not to mention the drama's focus on psychologically simple archetypes who, by now, might seem a bit staid. [...] The battle scenes are grand, the martial arts fights are fleet and impressive, and the romantic drama is taken seriously enough. It's a bit of a headache, but [it] still has its cornball charms."

Matt McCracken of In Review Online gave the film a negative review, writing, "For any viewer with a modicum of interest in giving their time to Tsui Hark's latest, familiarity will be required. [...] Structurally, the film is lost at sea in terms of what needs sutured in by way of flashbacks given the volume of more interesting material left on the table, while remaining equally bogged down with distended, divergent, and ultimately inert nationalist posturing about which dynasty should be protected or invaded and when. [...] The film does manage to impress in a limited sense in terms of the action-oriented, spectacular CGI requirements of its status as a 2025 Chinese New Year's Mainland production (although its competitor Creation of the Gods II: Demon Force is the clear victor in this regard), and the romantic and familial melodramatics may land for some viewers."

For InSession Film, Maxance Vincent gave it a B−, saying, "The duel between Guo Jing and the primary antagonist, Ouyang (Tony Leung Ka-fai), is Hark in his element – blending his conception of wuxia with the latest and greatest in modern filmmaking sensibilities [...] he still has the touch that made him such an iconic figure in Martial Arts filmmaking. [...] It's a shame that, despite his constant experimentation with form, the story in Legends of the Condor Heroes leaves a lot to be desired."
