= The Mystery of the Condor Hero =

1993 Hong Kong TV series

- VCD cover art
- 射鵰英雄傳之九陰真經
- Genre: Wuxia
- Based on: The Legend of the Condor Heroes by Jin Yong
- Screenplay by: Wong Yuk-tak
- Directed by: Poon Ka-tak
- Starring: David Chiang; Fiona Leung; Julian Cheung
- Opening theme: "Peach Blossoms in a Chaotic World" (亂世桃花) by George Lam and Sally Yeh
- Country of origin: Hong Kong
- Original language: Cantonese
- No. of episodes: 20

Production
- Producer: Poon Ka-tak
- Production location: Hong Kong
- Running time: ≈45 minutes per episode
- Production company: TVB

Original release
- Network: TVB Jade
- Release: 19 April – 14 May 1993

The Mystery of the Condor Hero (射鵰英雄傳之九陰真經) is a Hong Kong wuxia television series loosely adapted from the novel The Legend of the Condor Heroes by Jin Yong, serving as a backstory for the character Huang Yaoshi. The series was first broadcast on TVB Jade in Hong Kong in 1993.

== Synopsis ==
The series is set in 12th-century China against the backdrop of the wars between the Jin and Song empires. The Jiuyin Zhenjing, a highly coveted martial arts manual in the wulin, has been the target of various forces seeking to acquire it.

Feng Heng, a member of a shamanistic cult in the Jin Empire, is dragged into the power struggle as the manual is connected to the cult. By chance, she meets Huang Yaoshi, a formidable martial artist and polymath, and falls in love with him.

The manual ultimately ends up in the hands of Wang Chongyang, the founder of the Quanzhen Sect, after a martial arts contest on Mount Hua which saw Wang, Huang Yaoshi, Ouyang Feng, Hong Qigong, and Duan Zhixing emerging as the top five martial artists in the wulin.

At one point, Huang Yaoshi is poisoned while saving Feng Heng, who tricks Wang Chongyang's junior Zhou Botong into showing her the Jiuyin Zhenjing and letting her memorise it. Feng Heng then writes a copy of the manual from memory and uses it to help Huang heal himself. Ouyang Feng learns about it and comes to confront them.

Chen Xuanfeng, a former member of the Iron Palm Clan, has fallen out with the clan's chief Qiu Qianren as he disapproves of Qiu's unscrupulous attempts to seize the Jiuyin Zhenjing. Huang Yaoshi saves Chen from Qiu's attacks. Around the same time, Ouyang Feng's servant Mei Ruohua, who is initially hostile towards Chen, ends up getting into a romantic relationship with Chen. Along with Chen, Mei becomes an apprentice of Huang Yaoshi.

Ouyang Feng, after failing to seize the Jiuyin Zhenjing, coerces Mei Ruohua into pressuring Chen Xuanfeng to steal Huang Yaoshi's copy of the manual. Torn between his love for Mei and his loyalty to his master, Chen ultimately chooses to steal the manual and run away with Mei.

== Cast ==
- David Chiang as Huang Yaoshi
- Fiona Leung as Feng Heng
- Julian Cheung as Chen Xuanfeng
- Emily Kwan as Mei Ruohua
- Lau Kong as Hong Qigong
- Law Lok-lam as Ouyang Feng
- Kong Hon as Wang Chongyang
- Wong Wai as Duan Zhixing
- Liu Kai-chi as Zhou Botong
