= The Return of the Condor Heroes (1983 TV series) =

1983 Hong Kong TV series

- Hong Kong VCD cover art
- 神鵰俠侶
- Genre: Wuxia
- Based on: The Return of the Condor Heroes by Jin Yong
- Screenplay by: Lau Fong; Wu Sa; Chiu Chi-kin; Leung Chi-ming; Lam Ling; Wai Ka-fai; Leung Wing-mui
- Directed by: Sze-to Lap-kwong; Fan Sau-ming; Tam Sui-ming; Kuk Kwok-leung; Siu Hin-fai
- Starring: Andy Lau; Idy Chan; Bryan Leung; Susanna Au-yeung
- Opening theme: "When Will We Meet Again" (何日再相見) by Teresa Cheung
- Ending theme: "Firm in Both Love and Righteousness" (情義兩心堅) by Teresa Cheung; "Ask the World" (問世間) by Teresa Cheung; "Retain Today's Love" (留住今日情) by Teresa Cheung; "The Great Condor Hero" (神鵰大俠) by Andy Lau
- Composer: Joseph Koo
- Country of origin: Hong Kong
- Original language: Cantonese
- No. of episodes: 50 (list of episodes)

Production
- Executive producer: Siu Sang
- Production location: Hong Kong
- Editors: Chiu Chi-kin; Wu Sa
- Camera setup: Multi camera
- Running time: ≈42 minutes per episode
- Production company: TVB

Original release
- Network: TVB Jade
- Release: 31 October 1983 – 6 January 1984

Related
- The Legend of the Condor Heroes (1983); New Heavenly Sword and Dragon Sabre (1986)

The Return of the Condor Heroes (神鵰俠侶) is a Hong Kong wuxia television series adapted from the novel of the same title by Jin Yong. Produced by TVB and starring Andy Lau and Idy Chan, the 50-episode long series was first broadcast on TVB Jade from 31 October 1983 to 6 January 1984 in Hong Kong. The series was re-aired in 1988, 1990, 1997, 2013, and 2018 on TVB Jade. Jin Yong stated that he was most satisfied with this adaptation of The Return of the Condor Heroes.

== Cast ==
- Andy Lau as Yang Guo
- Idy Chan as Xiaolongnü
- Bryan Leung as Guo Jing
- Susanna Au-yeung as Huang Rong
- Annie Liu On Lai as Guo Fu
- Isabella Wong as Guo Xiang
- Kenneth Tsang as Huang Yaoshi
- Chun Wong as Zhou Botong
- Lau Dan as Hong Qigong
- Yeung Chak-lam as Ouyang Feng
- Lau Siu-ming as Yideng
- Lisa Lui as Li Mochou
- Cheung Lui as Jinlun Fawang
- Ha Yu as Qiu Chuji
- Wong Oi-ming as Cheng Ying
- Chan Fok-sang as Lu Wushuang
- Kwong Chor-fai as Yin Zhiping
- Kam Kwok-wai as Zhao Zhijing
- Felix Lok as Li Zhichang
- Simon Yam as Yelü Qi
- Amy Wu as Yelü Yan
- Kent Tong as Huodu
- Alex Man as Lu Liding
- Benz Hui as Gongsun Zhi
- Law Lan as Qiu Qianchi
- Yu Mo-lin as Granny Sun
- Rainbow Ching as Sun Bu'er
- Leung Siu-tik as Wang Chuyi
- Chan On-ying as Shagu
- Regina Tsang as Yinggu
- Richard Ng as Lu Guanying
- Susanna Kwan as Lin Chaoying
- Lau Kwok-sing as Da'erba
- Chu Siu-bo as Gongsun Lü'e
- Shih Kien as Qiu Qianren
- Lee Lung-kei as Wang Chongyang
- Wong Man-yee as Wanyan Ping
- Chan Yuk-lam as Hong Lingbo
- Ma Chung-tak as Wu Santong
- Mak Tsi-wan as Wu Xiuwen
- Lee Shu-ka as Wu Dunru
- Kong Ngai as Ke Zhen'e
- Law Wai-ping as Zhu Ziliu
- Kiu Hung as Chu Dongshan
- Chan Yau-hau as Yelü Chucai
- Chan Tik-hak as Lu Youjiao
- Cho Kai as Elder Peng
- Ho Pik-kin as the Sindhu Monk
- Tam Bing-man as Yinkexi
- Lam Wai-kin as Xiaoxiangzi
- Chan Kwok-kuen as Ma Guangzuo
- Wong Chi-wai as Nimoxing
- Philip Chan as Lu Zhanyuan
- Kau Hung-ping as He Yuanjun
- Poon Wang-pan as Guo Polu
- Yip Tin-hang as Kublai Khan
- Wai Lik as Möngke Khan
- Eddy Ko as Feng Mofeng

== Episodes ==
No.	Title	Original release date
1	"Episode 01"	31 October 1983
Li Mochou comes to kill Lu Liding and his family. She abducts their daughter, Lu Wushuang. Cheng Ying is saved by Huang Yaoshi, and the Wu brothers are saved by Ke Zhen'e. Yang Guo meets Ouyang Feng and is adopted as son by him. Afterwards, Guo Jing and Huang Rong also find Yang Guo and take care of him.
2	"Episode 02"	1 November 1983
Yang Quo escapes from Guo Jing and Huang Rong to find Ouyang Feng, but is followed by Ke Zhen'e. Yang Quo returns to Guo Jing and Huang Rong. While they are on the way to Peach Blossom Island, they find the Wu brothers and take them, too. Lu Wushuang, abducted by Li Mochou, is spared and becomes a servant to Li Mochou. On Peach Blossom Island, Guo Fu and the Wu brothers are taught martial skills while Yang Guo is only taught literature and is often bullied by the other three kids. However, Ouyang Feng finds Yang Guo and teaches him the Toad Stance. Guo Jing finds out about this and drives Ouyang Feng out of the island.
3	"Episode 03"	2 November 1983
Guo Jing takes Yang Guo to Quanzhen School to be educated there. However, Yang Guo's teacher, Zhao Zhijing, abuses him.
4	"Episode 04"	3 November 1983
Yang Guo runs away from Quanzhen and is saved by Granny Sun. Granny Sun is later accidentally killed by Hao Datong and Yang Guo is taken as an apprentice by Xiaolongnu from the Ancient Tomb School. Yang Guo learns martial arts as well as the history of the Ancient Tomb School as related to the establishment of Quanzhen School.
5	"Episode 05"	4 November 1983
A Mongol prince named Huodu is interested in Ancient Tomb School skills and approaches Zhao Zhijing to make him steal the map of the tomb from Quanzhen's archives.
6	"Episode 06"	7 November 1983
Yang Guo makes fun of Quanzhen monks. First, he dresses as a Tiger. Then, he impersonates Wang Chongyang. Guo Jing and Huang Rong come to Quanzhen to visit Yang Guo. However, they are told that Yang Guo has left and joined the Ancient Tomb School.
7	"Episode 07"	8 November 1983
Yang Guo befriends a Mongolian named Yelu Qi. A Jin princess named Wanyan Ping comes to the Yelu family to take revenge for her family. However, Yang Guo immediately recognizes that Wanyan Ping and Yelu Qi are actually also in love with each other and tries to help them get together.
8	"Episode 08"	9 November 1983
Guo Jing captures Yang Guo and intends to bring him to Quanzhen to clarify what happened to Yang Guo when he was a kid. Later, Wu brothers bully Yang Guo and releases him to fight with the Wu brothers and Guo Fu, but Yang Guo beats them and runs away. Yang Guo meets Zhou Botong and they go to Quanzhen. At the gate, they are stopped by Zhao Zhijing who doesn't recognize who Zhou Botong is. Yang Guo bullies Zhao Zhijing and returns to the Ancient Tomb. Yang Guo finds a perfect place nearby to practice the Maiden Sword energy cultivation. However, their practice is disturbed by a dispute between Zhao Zhijing and Yin Zhiping.
9	"Episode 09"	10 November 1983
Li Mochou visits the Ancient Tomb School with her apprentice, Hong Lingbo. After they get into a skirmish with Xiaolongnu and Yang Guo, Xiaolongnu closes all exits from the tomb and traps all four of them with no way out.
10	"Episode 10"	11 November 1983
Xiaolongnu accidentally finds a secret way out of the tomb and all of them manage to get out of the tomb. Yang Guo finds Ouyang Feng again, who closes Xiaolongnu's acupoints and teaches Yang Guo some martial skills. While they are away, Yin Zhiping blindfolds and rapes Xiaolongnu. Xiaolongnu assumes it is Yang Guo but since Yang Guo seems to not understand what happens, Xiaolongnu runs away. Yang Guo then wanders around looking for Xiaolongnu.
11	"Episode 11"	14 November 1983
Yang Guo meets Lu Wushuang, who is being chased by Li Mochou. He helps her get away from her former teacher.
12	"Episode 12"	15 November 1983
Yang Guo meets Yelu Qi again, who turns out to also be Zhou Botong's secret apprentice.
13	"Episode 13"	16 November 1983
Lu Wushuang is detained by Guo Fu and the Wu brothers, who think she will lead them to Li Mochou. Li Mochou then detains both Lu Wushuang and Yang Guo. Lu Wushuang manages to escape and tries to get help from Guo Jing.
14	"Episode 14"	17 November 1983
Yang Guo and Lu Wushuang are set free by Ouyang Feng. Huodu's teacher, Jinlun Guoshi, is planning to become the leader of the martial world.
15	"Episode 15"	18 November 1983
Yang Guo meets Hong Qigong on top of Mount Hua. Ouyang Feng stumbles on them, and he fights with Hong Qigong day and night, interrupted only by Yang Guo cooking meals for them.
16	"Episode 16"	21 November 1983
Both Hong Qigong and Ouyang Feng get injured deeply. Each of them teaches Yang Guo their best martial skills so he can show the other. They both die and Yang Guo buries them.
17	"Episode 17"	22 November 1983
Guo Jing hosts a hero convention to form an alliance against Mongol invasion. While Yang Guo is staying with Guo Jing's family, Guo Fu falls in love with him.
18	"Episode 18"	23 November 1983
Guo Jing plans to marry Guo Fu to Yang Guo. Lu Youjiao takes over leadership of Beggars' Gang from Huang Rong.
19	"Episode 19"	24 November 1983
Jinlun Guoshi crashes the hero convention and demands to be anointed the leader of martial world. Xiaolongnu comes to the convention and finds Yang Guo.
20	"Episode 20"	25 November 1983
With the help of Xiaolongnu, Yang Guo succeeds in driving away the Mongolians and becomes a hero. However, when he announces his intention to marry his teacher, he is shunned by the martial world.
21	"Episode 21"	28 November 1983
Yang Guo and Xiaolongnu meet and help another student-teacher couple who are condemned by society. Yang Guo goes to Quanzhen to ask Qiu Chuji who killed his father, Yang Kang.
22	"Episode 22"	29 November 1983
The student-teacher couple are stoned to death by their neighbors. When she sees this, Xiaolongnu becomes upset. Huang Rong convinces her to leave Yang Guo for his own good. Yang Guo falls into a valley and is saved by Cheng Ying.
23	"Episode 23"	30 November 1983
Cheng Ying's cousin, Lu Wushuang, joins her but she is also still chased by Li Mochou. When Li Mochou comes, they are saved by Huang Yaoshi.
24	"Episode 24"	1 December 1983
Shagu tells Yang Guo that Guo Jing and Huang Rong were the ones who killed Yang Guo's father. He then joins forces with Jinlun Guoshi because they both want to kill Guo Jing. While practicing martial skills, Xiaolongnu is injured and is saved by Gongsun Zhi from Passionless Valley.
25	"Episode 25"	2 December 1983
Zhou Botong is detained by people from Passionless Valley for wreaking havoc there. Yang Guo and the Mongolian mercenaries follow him there. After losing hopes to see Yang Guo again, Xiaolongnu accepts Gongsun Zhi's marriage proposal.
26	"Episode 26"	5 December 1983
Yang Guo meets Xiaolongnu and they try to leave but Gongsun Zhi doesn't let them go and imprisons Yang Guo. He also poisons him with Love Flower. Gongsun Zhi's daughter, Gongsun Lu'e, helps Yang Guo escape but both of them fall into a trap door.
27	"Episode 27"	6 December 1983
Gongsun Lu'e meets her mother, Qiu Qianchi, who has been trapped underground by her husband for years. Together, they crash Gongsun Zhi's wedding to Xiaolongnu.
28	"Episode 28"	7 December 1983
Gongsun Zhi fights against Yang Guo but is poisoned by Qiu Qianchi and runs away. Qiu Qianchi gives Yang Guo half of the Love Flower antidote and promises him the other half when he brings her the heads of Guo Jing and Huang Rong.
29	"Episode 29"	8 December 1983
Yang Guo goes to Xiangyang with Xiaolongnu to kill Guo Jing. Wu brothers try to infiltrate the Mongolian camps and kill Kublai. They are arrested, so Guo Jing and Yang Guo try to free them.
30	"Episode 30"	9 December 1983
Guo Jing tells Yang Guo what really happens when Yang Kang died. Yang Guo changes his mind about killing Guo Jing and they return to Xiangyang.
31	"Episode 31"	12 December 1983
Huang Rong gives birth to twins, a girl and a boy. Xiaolongnu takes the baby girl but the baby is then taken by Li Mochou, who thinks it's Xiaolongnu's baby with Yang Guo.
32	"Episode 32"	13 December 1983
Yang Guo meets a giant condor who takes him to Dugu Qiubai's tomb. Wu brothers fight each other in the woods to determine who gets to be with Guo Fu. Yang Guo stops their fighting.
33	"Episode 33"	14 December 1983
Wu brothers stop fighting each other, but when they see Li Mochou they try to take revenge on her. Li Mochou throws Icicle Needles at them. Yang Guo, who thinks he is going to die anyway, sucks the poison out of their blood and gets more injured than before. Xiaolongnu finds out that Yin Zhiping raped her.
34	"Episode 34"	15 December 1983
Yelu Qi tries to assassinate Kublai and is almost discovered but is saved by Zhou Botong. Zhou Botong and Xiaolongnu is trapped in a cave by Jinlun Guoshi and Zhao Zijing.
35	"Episode 35"	16 December 1983
Yelu Qi goes to Xiangyang to meet Guo Jing. Reverend Sindu goes to Passionless Valley to find the antidote to Love Flower. In a fit of rage, Guo Fu chops off Yang Guo's left arm.
36	"Episode 36"	19 December 1983
The giant Condor treats Yang Guo's injury and trains him in Dugu Qiubai's sword martial arts. Huang Rong meets Li Mochou who is still carrying the baby Guo Xiang.
37	"Episode 37"	20 December 1983
Huang Rong fights with Li Mochou, but the baby is stolen by Yang Guo. Huang Rong then joins forces with Li Mochou to find Guo Xiang. Zhao Zhijing wrestles the title of Quanzhen abbot from Yin Zhiping and collaborates with the Mongolians.
38	"Episode 38"	21 December 1983
Quanzhen elders come out of meditation to retake the monastery from the Mongolians. Xiaolongnu arrives to kill Yin Zhiping, but he feels so guilty that he commits suicide. Xiaolongnu is accidentally injured by Quanzhen elders while they are fighting against Jinlun Guoshi. Yang Guo finds Xiaolongnu and they get married.
39	"Episode 39"	22 December 1983
Yang Guo and Xiaolongnu go back to the Ancient Tomb. Zhao Zhijing is killed by Quanzhen elders for treason.
40	"Episode 40"	23 December 1983
Li Mochou goes into the Ancient Tomb, followed by Wu Santong, Wu brothers, Guo Fu, and Yelu Qi. Guo Fu mistakenly throws poison darts at Yang Guo and Xiaolongnu.
41	"Episode 41"	26 December 1983
Yang Guo and Xiaolongnu retreat to a remote hut. They are visited by Reverend Yideng and Ci'en (Qiu Qianren). They all go to Passionless Valley to seek the antidote for Yang Guo.
42	"Episode 42"	27 December 1983
While trapped in a Love Flower formation, Li Mochou uses Hong Lingbo to escape and kills her in the process. Huang Rong also comes to Passionless Valley and Xiaolongnu returns Guo Xiang to her. Qiu Qianchi tries to make Ci'en kill Huang Rong.
43	"Episode 43"	28 December 1983
Gongsun Lu'e secretly gives Yang Guo a map of where Reverend Sindu is detained so Yang Guo can save him. She also poisons herself with Love Flower to get her the antidote from her mother.
44	"Episode 44"	29 December 1983
Xiaolongnu fights Gongsun Zhi to get the antidote for Yang Guo, but Yang Guo throws it to the bottom of the Passionless Valley because it's not enough for both of them. Huang Rong talks Xiaolongnu into convincing Yang Guo to take Heartbreak Grass to cure himself. Xiaolongnu then writes a note to Yang Guo to meet her in 16 years, then disappears.
45	"Episode 45"	30 December 1983
Sixteen years later, Yang Guo meets Guo Xiang. They convince Zhou Botong to meet with Yinggu. After being forgiven by Zhou Botong and Yinggu for killing their son, Ci'en dies in peace.
46	"Episode 46"	2 January 1984
Ke Zhen'e tells Yang Guo the real story of Yang Kang. Lu Youjiao is killed and the Dog Beating Staff is stolen by Huodu.
47	"Episode 47"	3 January 1984
Beggars' Gang holds a competition to choose their next leader. Yang Guo gives Guo Xiang her birthday present by killing many Mongolian soldiers and keeping Xiangyang safe. Huodu is killed by Da'erba.
48	"Episode 48"	4 January 1984
Guo Xiang is kidnapped by Jinlun Guoshi. Huang Rong, Cheng Ying, and Lu Wushuang go to Passionless Valley to look for Guo Xiang and Yang Guo. On their way, they meet Zhou Botong and Reverend Yideng.
49	"Episode 49"	5 January 1984
Jinlun Guoshi is detained by Zhou Botong, but while the others are away, Guo Xiang is tricked into releasing him. Yang Guo leaps to the bottom of Passionless Valley and finds Xiaolongnu.
50	"Episode 50"	6 January 1984
Guo Xiang is used as leverage against Guo Jing so he would surrender Xiangyang to the Mongols. Huang Yaoshi comes and leads the Song army to repel the Mongols. Yang Guo saves Guo Xiang and kills Möngke Khan.
