= Story of the Vulture Conqueror =

1958 Hong Kong film by Wu Pang

- 1958 newspaper ad for Part 1
- 射鵰英雄傳
- Directed by: Wu Pang
- Screenplay by: Wu Pang; Yue Fei; Miu Ching
- Based on: The Legend of the Condor Heroes by Jin Yong
- Starring: Cho Tat-wah; Yung Siu-yee
- Production company: Emei Film Company
- Release dates: 23 October 1958 (Part 1); 3 June 1959 (Part 2)
- Country: Hong Kong
- Language: Cantonese

Story of the Vulture Conqueror (射鵰英雄傳) is a two-part Hong Kong wuxia film adapted from the novel The Legend of the Condor Heroes by Jin Yong. The first part was released in 1958 while the second part was released in the following year. The film was directed by Wu Pang and starred Cho Tat-wah and Yung Siu-yee in the leading roles.

== Cast ==
- Cho Tat-wah as Guo Jing
- Yung Siu-yee as Huang Rong / Feng Heng
- Lam Kau as Yang Kang
- Lai Kwan-lin as Mu Nianci
- Lee Ching as Yang Tiexin
- Mui Yee as Bao Xiruo
- Lau Siu-man as Zhou Botong / Guo Xiaotian
- Lee Heung-kam as Li Ping
- Shih Kien as Huang Yaoshi
- Ling Mung as Hong Qigong
- Lam Lo-ngok as Ouyang Feng / Jebe
- Chan Lap-pan as Mei Chaofeng
- Ho Siu-hung as Qiu Qianren
- Yeung Yip-wang as Wang Chongyang
- Wong Chor-san as Wang Chuyi
- Siu Hon-sang as Ke Zhen'e
- Ng Yan-chi as Zhu Cong
- Chan Yiu-lam as Han Baoju
- Chow Siu-loi as Nan Xiren
- Wu Ka as Han Xiaoying
- Tsui Sung-hok as Quan Jinfa
- Tong Ka as Zhang Asheng
- Ho San as Wanyan Honglie
- Yuen Siu-tien as Liang Ziweng
- Chu Chiu as Duan Tiande
- Chan Kam-tong as Lu Chengfeng
- Mak Sin-shing as Lu Guanying
