= The Eagle Shooting Heroes =

1993 Hong Kong film by Jeffrey Lau

- DVD cover art
- 射鵰英雄傳之東成西就
- Directed by: Jeffrey Lau
- Screenplay by: Jeffrey Lau
- Based on: The Legend of the Condor Heroes by Jin Yong
- Produced by: Wong Kar-wai; Tsai Sung-lin
- Starring: Leslie Cheung; Tony Leung Ka-fai; Tony Leung Chiu-wai; Jacky Cheung; Kenny Bee; Brigitte Lin; Joey Wong; Maggie Cheung; Carina Lau; Veronica Yip
- Cinematography: Peter Pau
- Edited by: Hai Kit-wai
- Music by: James Wong; Mark Lui
- Production companies: Block 2 Pictures; Scholar Films
- Distributed by: Newport Entertainment Ltd
- Release date: 5 February 1993
- Running time: 113 minutes
- Country: Hong Kong
- Language: Cantonese
- Box office: HK$23.463 million

The Eagle Shooting Heroes (射鵰英雄傳之東成西就) is a 1993 Hong Kong wuxia comedy film directed by Jeffrey Lau and produced by Wong Kar-wai. The film is a parody of the novel The Legend of the Condor Heroes by Jin Yong, and was produced in response to the over-budgeting of Wong's 1994 film Ashes of Time, which is adapted from the same novel. In order to cover up the cost of Ashes of Time, which was still unfinished at the time, Wong decided to use the cast members to perform different roles and shoot a "quick-and-dirty" comedy film to be released during the Lunar New Year in 1993 to make as much money as possible. The Eagle Shooting Heroes has since been considered a classic example of the mo lei tau style of comedy in Hong Kong films.

== Synopsis ==
Ouyang Feng is having a secret affair with his cousin, the Queen Consort of Jinlun. To prevent the King from finding out about their relationship, the pair decide to murder the King and steal the royal seal to take over the kingdom. The King's daughter, the Third Princess, manages to escape with the seal. While hunting down the princess, Ouyang Feng accidentally kills Wang Chongyang, who asks the princess to find his junior Zhou Botong and get Zhou to avenge him.

The Third Princess seeks help from Jiugong Zhenren, who sends his apprentice Huang Yaoshi to accompany her to find the Jiuyin Zhenjing and avenge her father. Huang Yaoshi's junior, who has a crush on her senior, feels jealous of the princess. After failing to obtain the Jiuyin Zhenjiang, they meet with Duan Zhixing, a close childhood friend of the princess. Duan Zhixing was an arhat in his previous life and can only become an immortal if he meets an ideal lover.

Zhou Botong subsequently shows up and mistakenly accuses the princess of murdering Wang Chongyang. Huang Yaoshi and Duan Zhixing team up to subdue Zhou Botong and force him to become a servant. Duan Zhixing also realises that Huang Yaoshi is the ideal lover he has been waiting for, so he disguises himself as the Third Princess and tricks Huang into saying "I love you." Ouyang Feng seizes the Jiuyin Zhenjing and prepares to return to the kingdom. The Third Princess, accompanied by her allies and a now-immortal Duan Zhixing, stops Ouyang Feng and defeats him.

== Cast ==
- Leslie Cheung as Huang Yaoshi
- Tony Leung Ka-fai as Duan Zhixing
- Tony Leung Chiu-wai as Ouyang Feng
- Jacky Cheung as Hong Qigong
- Kenny Bee as Wang Chongyang
- Brigitte Lin as the Third Princess
- Joey Wong as Huang Yaoshi's junior
- Maggie Cheung as the Imperial Master
- Carina Lau as Zhou Botong
- Veronica Yip as the Queen Consort
- Szema Wah Lung as the King
- Paw Hee-ching as one of the Third Princess's guards
- Yu Ming as Jiugong Zhenren

== Music ==
In addition to a score by James Wong and Mark Lui, the film contains a song set to the overture from Gioacchino Rossini's Guillaume Tell, as well as uncredited excerpts from "L'amour est un oiseau rebelle" from Georges Bizet's Carmen and Danse des petits cygnes from Piotr Ilyich Tchaikovsky's Swan Lake.
