= Zhu Cong =

Zhu Cong may refer to:

- Zhu Cong (footballer), Chinese footballer who plays for Guangdong Sunray Cave.
- Character from Jin Yong's wuxia novel The Legend of the Condor Heroes.
