= Mei Chaofeng =

Fictional character in the novel The Legend of the Condor Heroes by Jin Yong

- The Legend of the Condor Heroes character
- Created by: Jin Yong

In-universe information
- Nickname: "Iron Corpse"
- Gender: Female
- Spouse: Chen Xuanfeng
- Master: Huang Yaoshi
- Apprentice: Yang Kang

Mei Chaofeng
- Traditional Chinese: 梅超風
- Simplified Chinese: 梅超风
Transcriptions
Standard Mandarin
- Hanyu Pinyin: Méi Chāofēng

Mei Ruohua
- Traditional Chinese: 梅若華
- Simplified Chinese: 梅若华
Transcriptions
Standard Mandarin
- Hanyu Pinyin: Méi Ruòhuá

Mei Chaofeng (梅超風), originally known as Mei Ruohua (梅若華) and also known as Cyclone Mei in the St. Martin's translation, is a fictional character in the wuxia novel The Legend of the Condor Heroes by Jin Yong. Nicknamed "Iron Corpse" (鐵屍) for her dark complexion and rigid appearance, she is an apprentice of Huang Yaoshi, one of the five most powerful martial artists in the wulin (martial artists' community). Along with her husband "Copper Corpse" Chen Xuanfeng, she is highly feared in the wulin for her cruelty and viciousness, as well her mastery of the "Nine Yin White Bone Claw" (九陰白骨爪). She is killed by Ouyang Feng, another of the "Five Greats", while attempting to save Huang Yaoshi.

== Fictional character biography ==
Mei is an orphan who was sold to a wealthy family before she was bought by Huang Yaoshi and taken to Peach Blossom Island, where she was trained in martial arts by Huang as one of his apprentices. During this time, she fell in love with Chen Xuanfeng, another of her master's apprentices. Afraid to seek their master's blessings of their union, they decided to elope and steal their master's copy of the Jiuyin Zhenjing, a highly coveted martial arts manual, in the hope of mastering its skills and being strong enough to stand up to their master.

Mei and Chen learnt the Nine Yin White Bone Claw, an "unorthodox" skill derived from their flawed interpretation of the Jiuyin Zhenjing. To master the skill as quickly as possible, they killed many people and used their skulls for practice. Over time, they became highly dreaded figures in the wulin for their cruelty and viciousness, but also suffered chronic internal injuries from practising the "Nine Yin White Bone Claw" in their "unorthodox" manner. They fled to Mongolia to evade their enemies and encountered the novel's protagonist Guo Jing, who is being trained by the "Seven Freaks of Jiangnan". Previously, Mei and Chen had killed the brother of Ke Zhen'e, one of the "Seven Freaks", and blinded Ke himself. During their encounter, Chen is unintentionally killed by Guo, while Mei is blinded by darts from Ke. Mei manages to escape with Chen's body, and she removes the skin from his body which has the Jiuyin Zhenjing tattooed on.

Mei later leaves Mongolia after mistakenly believing that she is facing off the "Seven Immortals of Quanzhen" during a confrontation, and finds shelter in the residence of Yang Kang, the novel's antagonist. She teaches Yang Kang the Nine Yin White Bone Claw in exchange for him keeping her location a secret and providing her with the victims she needs for her practice.

Despite turning her back on her master, Mei still remains deeply loyal to Huang Yaoshi all this time. She sacrifices herself to save Huang by intercepting a fatal strike from Ouyang Feng during a fight against the "Seven Immortals of Quanzhen". Before she dies, Huang forgives her for her betrayal and says she is still a member of Peach Blossom Island.

== In adaptations ==
In the third edition of the novel, Jin Yong deepened the master–apprentice relationship between Mei Chaofeng and Huang Yaoshi, and this was later adapted into a romantic relationship between them in the 2021 film The Legend of the Condor Heroes: The Cadaverous Claw.

Notable actresses who have portrayed Mei Chaofeng in films and television series include Chan Lap-ban (1958), Wong Man-wai (1983), Betty Mak (1994), Yang Liping (2003), Kong Wei (2008), Mi Lu (2017), and Meng Ziyi (2024).

Mei Chaofeng is also a playable character in the 2008 PC fighting game Street Fighter Online: Mouse Generation.
