= Street Fighter Online: Mouse Generation =

2008 video game

- Developers: Daletto, Revoltech
- Series: Street Fighter
- Platform: PC
- Release: 2008
- Genre: Fighting

Street Fighter Online: Mouse Generation (ストリートファイター オンライン マウスジェネレーション) is a 2008 fighting game produced by Capcom subsidiary Daletto (a joint venture of Capcom and Games Arena) in association with Revoltech and released for the PC. The game uses a PC mouse for combat, and the characters are customizable to some degree. In addition to the established Street Fighter characters in the game, Mouse Generation also includes licensed characters based on novels, manga and anime such as the characters based on the works by Wuxia novelist Louis Cha, and one real-life person.

While Mouse Generation can arguably be considered a Street Fighter game (as the name would suggest), it is actually a crossover game (like X-Men vs. Street Fighter or Street Fighter X Tekken), and as such it is not canon to the Street Fighter universe.

== Characters ==
=== From the Street Fighter series ===
- Ryu
- Chun-Li
- Zangief
- Guile
- Ken

=== From Louis Cha's novels ===
- Hu Fei (胡斐(ヒコ) Hiko) from Fox Volant of the Snowy Mountain
- He Tieshou (何鐵手(テイラン) Teiran), from Sword Stained with Royal Blood
- Mei Chaofeng (梅超風(バイチョウフ) Baichōfu) from The Legend of the Condor Heroes
- Linghu Chong (令狐沖(レイコチュウ) Reikochū) from The Smiling, Proud Wanderer
- Zhou Botong (周伯通(シュウハクツウ) Shū Hakutsū) from The Legend of the Condor Heroes

=== From Cyborg 009 ===
- Cyborg 004
- Cyborg 005
- Cyborg 009
- Cyborg 006

=== From the Rival Schools series ===
- Batsu Ichimonji
- Akira Kazama

=== Other characters ===
- Shin – The game's sole new character, Shin is a Japanese-Korean Taekwondo master who is following the footsteps of his father, a former Japanese Karate master, and his maternal grandfather, a Taekwondo master from South Korea, although he actually disliked combative sports preferring to be a musician or artist. He changed his mind and studied Taekwondo because he thought it was brilliant.
- Johannes Krauser II (Soichi Negishi's alter-ego from Detroit Metal City)
- Gavan (from Space Sheriff Gavan)
- Barack Obama – A caricature of the United States president Barack Obama was made as Valentine's Day DLC for the game. He could perform several of Ryu's special moves, but always had a floating rectangular speech bubble follow him around. This fictionalised version of Barack Obama does not have any specific origin, so he was the second original character created for Street Fighter Online after Shin.

== Gameplay ==
Fighters are controlled by mouse movements, mouse buttons and the scroll wheel. Characters in the game were apparently action-figure versions of the actual characters, using Revoltech's action-figure 3D engine. As such, fighter's body parts could be switched and customized. The character models were designed to look like the action-figure of the characters, with blocky limbs and visible joint screws. While this engine allowed for "maximum flexibility", it made the character models "revolting".

The game was free to play. Daletto's revenue came from micro-transactions, through a store, and through in-game Gashapon dispensers (licensed from Bandai). Players were able to purchase extra body parts and outfits, to further customize their characters. Some purchasable items were fairly abstract, such as squid-shaped hats, as a cross-promotion with pre-existing squid-shaped USB thumb drives.

The high number of pre-existing licensed characters compared to the low number of actual Street Fighter characters was also a source of criticism. The only original character, Shin, never made any playable appearances after this game.
