= Condor Trilogy =

Novel series by Jin Yong

The Condor Trilogy
- The Legend of the Condor Heroes (1957); The Return of the Condor Heroes (1959); The Heaven Sword and Dragon Saber (1961)
- Author: Jin Yong
- Original title: 射鵰三部曲
- Country: Hong Kong
- Language: Chinese
- Publisher: Hong Kong Commercial Daily; Ming Pao
- Published: 1957–1963
- Media type: Serial (original); Print
- No. of books: 3

Condor Trilogy
- Traditional Chinese: 射鵰三部曲
- Simplified Chinese: 射雕三部曲
Transcriptions
Standard Mandarin
- Hanyu Pinyin: Shèdiāo Sānbùqǔ
Yue: Cantonese
- Jyutping: Se^{6} Diu^{1} Saam^{3} Bou^{6} Kuk^{1}

The Condor Trilogy (射鵰三部曲) is a series of three wuxia novels by Hong Kong writer Jin Yong (Louis Cha) – The Legend of the Condor Heroes (射鵰英雄傳), The Return of the Condor Heroes (神鵰俠侶), and The Heaven Sword and Dragon Saber (倚天屠龍記) – which were first published as serials in the newspapers Hong Kong Commercial Daily and Ming Pao between 1957 and 1963.

A 12-book English translation of the trilogy was first published by MacLehose Press in February 2018. Volume 1 has been published, containing the first four books, and the remaining eight are pending translation and publication.

== Historical setting ==
The first novel, The Legend of the Condor Heroes, is set in 12th-century China against a backdrop of the wars between the Song and Jin empires, while the Mongol Empire emerges in the north. The second novel, The Return of the Condor Heroes, is set in the 13th century during the Mongol conquest of China, featuring the historical Battle of Xiangyang. The third novel, The Heaven Sword and Dragon Saber, is set in the 14th century around the fall of the Mongol-led Yuan dynasty and the founding of the Ming dynasty.

== Plot ==
=== Book of Wumu ===
The Book of Wumu is a fictional military treatise written by the Song general Yue Fei. The book is highly sought after by the Jin Empire. Guo Jing uses the knowledge he acquired from the book to defend the Song Empire. Before his death, he hid the book in the blade of the Dragon-Slaying Saber. Nearly a century after the Battle of Xiangyang, the book comes into the possession of Zhang Wuji, who uses one of the strategies in the book to defeat Yuan forces at the siege of Mount Song. He passes the book to Xu Da, who studies it and becomes a brilliant military leader. Xu Da leads rebel forces to overthrow the Yuan dynasty and becomes one of the pioneers of the Ming dynasty.

==== Early history ====
Prior to his execution, Yue Fei wrote his battle experiences in a book in the hope that future generations will continue his mission of defeating the Jin Empire. After his death, the book is renamed Book of Wumu and hidden in a cave covered by a waterfall within the Song imperial palace in Lin'an (present-day Hangzhou). The book was later stolen by Shangguan Jiannan, a former subordinate of Han Shizhong and the chief of the Iron Palm Clan, and taken to Iron Palm Peak, where it is hidden in the clan's forbidden grounds.

==== The Legend of the Condor Heroes ====
The book is highly sought after by the Jin Empire, who hopes to use the military strategies in the book to defeat the Mongols in the north and conquer the Song Empire in the south.

Wanyan Honglie, the sixth prince of Jin, travels to Song in disguise to find the book. With the help of Ouyang Feng and others, he breaks into the palace and enters the cave, where they find a box which supposedly contains the book. Guo Jing fights with Ouyang Feng to prevent him from stealing the book, but is severely wounded when Yang Kang betrays and stabs him. Guo survives with the help of Huang Rong and recovers from his injuries seven days later.

Guo and Huang discover a map to the book's location in Qu Lingfeng's rundown inn and realise that the book is actually on Iron Palm Peak. They travel there and succeed in retrieving the book. Guo later uses the knowledge he acquired from the book to lead the Mongols to victory during the Mongol invasion of Khwarezmia. However, as Guo is unwilling to side with the Mongols to conquer the Song Empire, he leaves Mongolia for good and returns to Song.

==== The Return of the Condor Heroes ====
In the sequel, the adult Guo Jing dedicates his life to defending the Song Empire from foreign invasion. By then, the Jin Empire had been conquered by the Mongols, who proceed to attack Song and Dali thereafter. Guo uses the tactics from the Book of Wumu, his understanding of Mongol warfare, Xiangyang's natural barriers (the Han River waterways and the surrounding mountains), and his allies from the wulin to counter the invaders for 46 years. However, after the loss of a nearby fortified city Fancheng, Guo Jing eventually dies a martyr when Xiangyang finally falls to the Mongols.

Before Guo's death, he hid the Book of Wumu in the blade of the Dragon-Slaying Saber. The latest edition of The Heaven Sword and Dragon Saber states that the manual was hidden on Peach Blossom Island, together with the Nine Yin Manual and the 'Eighteen Subduing Dragon Palms' manual. The Saber carries a piece of an iron-plated map of the books' location, while another half of the map is in the saber's counterpart, the Heaven Reliant Sword. The Saber is passed on to Guo Jing's son Guo Polu, but is later lost in the wulin by the end of the Yuan dynasty. The Sword comes into the possession of Guo's younger daughter Guo Xiang, who founds the Emei Sect later.

==== The Heaven Sword and Dragon Saber ====
Nearly a century after the Battle of Xiangyang, the Dragon-Slaying Saber is taken by Xie Xun after it is found by the Heavenly Eagle Cult. Xie keeps it with him for several years as he lives on an isolated island. He loses it to Zhou Zhiruo later. Zhou breaks the weapon by clashing it against the Heaven-Reliant Sword, and the items hidden in the blades are revealed. The Book of Wumu comes into the possession of the rebel leader Zhang Wuji, who uses one of the strategies detailed in the book to defeat government forces at the siege of Mount Song. He passes the book to Xu Da later and Xu becomes a brilliant military leader after studying it. Xu leads the rebel forces to overthrow the Yuan dynasty and becomes one of the founding pioneers of the Ming dynasty.
