= Zhou Botong =

Fictional character in the Condor Trilogy by Jin Yong

- Condor Trilogy character
- Zhou Botong in the 2021 mobile game The Legend of the Condor Heroes
- Created by: Jin Yong

In-universe information
- Nicknames: "Old Imp"; "Central Imp"
- Gender: Male
- Affiliation: Quanzhen Sect
- Significant other: Liu Ying
- Children: unnamed son

Zhou Botong
- Chinese: 周伯通
Transcriptions
Standard Mandarin
- Hanyu Pinyin: Zhōu Bótōng
Yue: Cantonese
- Jyutping: Zau^{1} Baak^{3}-tung^{1}

Zhou Botong (周伯通) is a fictional character in the wuxia novels The Legend of the Condor Heroes and The Return of the Condor Heroes by Jin Yong. A member of the Quanzhen Sect, he is highly-skilled in martial arts, having been trained by his senior, Wang Chongyang. Although he is already in his old age, he is still known for behaving childishly and constantly seeking fun, hence he is nicknamed "Old Imp" (老頑童). At the end of the second novel, he takes the central position of the "Five Greats", the five most powerful martial artists in the wulin (martial artists' community).

== Fictional character biography ==
Zhou Botong is a junior of Wang Chongyang, the founder of the Quanzhen Sect and one of the "Five Greats", the five most powerful martial artists in the wulin of his time. Like his senior, he is highly-skilled in martial arts. However, he is also known for his childish temperament and playful behaviour, even when he is in his old age, hence he is nicknamed "Old Imp".

In his younger days, he had a secret affair with Liu Ying, a consort of the Dali Kingdom's ruler Duan Zhixing, who is one of the "Five Greats". When Wang Chongyang found out about the affair, he forced Zhou Botong to end it and leave with him. Unknown to them, Liu Ying was already pregnant with Zhou Botong's child at the time, and she later gave birth to a son. The infant was mortally wounded by a masked Qiu Qianren. When Liu Ying begged Duan Zhixing to use his neigong to save her son, Duan refused and the infant ultimately died.

After Wang Chongyang's death, Zhou Botong wanders around with a copy of the Jiuyin Zhenjing, a highly coveted martial arts manual which Wang had entrusted to him for safekeeping but forbidden him from learning the skills in it. He meets Huang Yaoshi, another of the "Five Greats", and Huang's wife Feng Heng, who tricked him into letting her read the manual. She had an eidetic memory and was able to memorise the entire manual and rewrite it from memory for her husband. When Zhou Botong realised he had been tricked, he confronted Huang Yaoshi on Peach Blossom Island and they fought. Both of them reached a stalemate and Zhou Botong was trapped for the next 15 years on the island, where he lived in a cave.

Zhou Botong first appears in the novel when the protagonist Guo Jing visits the island and encounters him. They become sworn brothers, and Guo Jing learns about the history of the "Five Greats" and the Jiuyin Zhenjing from Zhou Botong, who also teaches him two skills and makes him memorise the manual. With help from others, Zhou Botong ultimately resolves his conflict with Huang Yaoshi and leaves the island.

Zhou Botong appears in The Return of the Condor Heroes when he meets Xiaolongnü by chance and they teach other one of their skills to counter the villain Jinlun Guoshi. Later, with help from the protagonist Yang Guo, Zhou Botong meets Liu Ying, Duan Zhixing, and Qiu Qianren again. He forgives a dying Qiu Qianren for murdering his infant son, and reconciles with Liu Ying and Duan Zhixing.

== Martial arts and skills ==
Zhou Botong is a formidable martial artist and his best-known skills are the 72 Styles Vacant Fist (七十二路空明拳), which he created to counter Hong Qigong's Eighteen Dragon-Subduing Palms, and the Technique of Ambidexterity (雙手互搏), which allows him to use two different fighting styles (one with each hand) at the same time.

== In adaptations ==
Notable actors and actresses who have portrayed Zhou Botong in films and television series include Philip Kwok (1977–1981), Carina Lau (1993), Liu Kai-chi (1993) and Wayne Lai (1994–1995).

Zhou Botong is a playable character in the 2008 PC fighting game Street Fighter Online: Mouse Generation.
