= Huang Rong =

Fictional character in the Condor Trilogy by Jin Yong

- Condor Trilogy character
- Huang Rong as illustrated by Lee Chi Ching in the manhua series
- Created by: Jin Yong

In-universe information
- Gender: Female
- Affiliation: Peach Blossom Island; Beggar Clan
- Family: Huang Yaoshi (father); Feng Heng (mother)
- Spouse: Guo Jing
- Children: Guo Fu; Guo Xiang; Guo Polu
- Masters: Hong Qigong; Yideng; Liu Ying
- Apprentices: Wu Dunru; Wu Xiuwen; Yang Guo; Yelü Qi; Lu Youjiao

Huang Rong
- Traditional Chinese: 黃蓉
- Simplified Chinese: 黄蓉
Transcriptions
Standard Mandarin
- Hanyu Pinyin: Huáng Róng
Yue: Cantonese
- Jyutping: Wong^{4} Jung^{4}

Huang Rong (黃蓉), also known as Lotus Huang in the St. Martin's English translation, is the fictional female lead character in the wuxia novel The Legend of the Condor Heroes by Jin Yong. She also appears as a supporting character in the sequel, The Return of the Condor Heroes.

== Fictional character biography ==
Huang Rong's parents are Huang Yaoshi and Feng Heng. Her father is one of the "Five Greats", the five most powerful martial artists in the wulin, and the master of Peach Blossom Island. Her mother died shortly after she was born, so she was raised solely by her father on the island. An intelligent and quick-learning girl, she picked up all the skills and knowledge imparted to her by her father. At one point, after quarrelling with her father, she leaves the island, disguises herself as a beggar, and roams the wulin in search of adventure.

Huang Rong meets Guo Jing, her future husband, for the first time in a restaurant when he offers to pay for her meal and freely gives her his prized Ferghana horse. Since then, she is attracted to him as she sees him as a simple, honest and innocent lad. The two of them go on adventures in the wulin together even though Guo Jing's masters, the "Seven Freaks of Jiangnan", dislike Huang Rong because of her father's negative reputation in the wulin. They meet Hong Qigong, another of the "Five Greats", and he initially reluctant to teach Huang Rong any skills upon learning that she is his rival's daughter. However, he gradually takes to her, especially after she and Guo Jing save him from Ouyang Feng. After losing all his neigong while purging poison from his body, Hong Qigong decides to pass his position as chief of the Beggar Clan to Huang Rong and teaches her the Dog-Beating Staff Technique.

Huang Rong has a significant role in the death of Yang Kang, the antagonist, even though she does not kill him directly. Yang Kang attacks her with a palm strike in an attempt to silence her when she is about to reveal the truth behind the murders he committed, but ends up hitting the spiked armoured vest she is wearing. The armour has incidentally been stained with a deadly venom so the venom seeps through Yang Kang's wounds into his body and eventually kills him.

In The Return of the Condor Heroes, set several years after the first novel, Huang Rong and Guo Jing have become prominent figures in the wulin and highly-regarded heroes in the Song Empire for protecting the city of Xiangyang from Mongol invaders. The Guos also have three children: elder daughter Guo Fu, and the twins Guo Xiang and Guo Polu. Both Huang Rong and Guo Jing play supporting roles in the character development of the protagonist Yang Guo, Yang Kang's son. When they first meet Yang Guo, Huang Rong is suspicious of the boy due to their past history with his father and also because she is worried that he will turn out to be like his father. However, she gradually gains his trust after he selflessly saves their family from danger on numerous occasions.

It is revealed in The Heaven Sword and Dragon Saber that all the Guos except Guo Xiang were killed during the Battle of Xiangyang, and she and Guo Jing are remembered in the wulin as national martyrs. Guo Xiang continued roaming the wulin as a knight-errant fighting injustice and helping the poor before eventually founding the Emei Sect.

== Character description ==
Huang Rong is described as a young beggar dressed in filthy clothing during her first appearance in The Legend of the Condor Heroes. Her face is stained with mud and her clothes are covered in dust. When Guo Jing agrees to meet her on the riverbank, she looks completely different from her earlier image, now that she is clean and dressed in beautiful clothes. Her appearance is described as "with skin whiter than snow, charm unrivalled by any, and a presence so stunning, one would almost blush from staring at her too intently". Guo Jing is taken aback by her new look.

== Martial arts and skills ==
Huang Rong learnt most of her martial arts and skills from her father Huang Yaoshi, including the Falling Flower Divine Sword Palm (落英神劍掌), Divine Flicking Finger (彈指神通), and Jade Flute Swordplay (玉簫劍法). Her most powerful skill is the Dog-Beating Staff Technique (打狗棒法), which is known only to the Beggar Clan's chief and taught to her by Hong Qigong. From Hong Qigong, she also learnt the Carefree Fist (逍遙遊) and the dart-throwing technique Rain of Petals (滿天花雨). She also learnt the Jiuyin Zhenjing from her husband.

Besides fighting skills, Huang Rong is well-versed in culinary arts, geography, medicine, strategy, mathematics, music, literature, and the Qimen Dunjia, having learnt from her polymath father and inherited her mother's eidetic memory.

== In adaptations ==
Notable actresses who have portrayed Huang Rong in films and television series include Yung Siu-yee (1958), Michelle Yim (1976), Barbara Yung (1983), Susanna Au-yeung (1983), Idy Chan (1988), Athena Chu (1994), Bonnie Ngai (1995), Zhou Xun (2003), Kong Lin (2006), Ariel Lin (2008), Yang Mingna (2014), Li Yitong (2017), Lin Yanrou (2021), Gong Beibi (2022) and Bao Shangen (2024).

Huang Rong is a main character in the 2000 role-playing video game Shachou Eiyuuden: The Eagle Shooting Heroes, released by Sony Computer Entertainment for the PlayStation.

== Family tree ==
Guo Jing and Huang Rong's family tree

Guo Xiaotian
Guo Jing	Guo Polu
Li Ping
Guo Xiang
Huang Yaoshi
Huang Rong	Guo Fu
Feng Heng
Yelü Qi
Yelü Chucai	Yelü Zhu
Yelü Yan
Wu Santong	Wu Dunru
Wu Sanniang	Wu Xiuwen
Wanyan Ping
