= Mu Nianci =

Fictional character in the novel The Legend of the Condor Heroes by Jin Yong

- The Legend of the Condor Heroes character
- Mu Nianci in the 2021 mobile game The Legend of the Condor Heroes
- Created by: Jin Yong

In-universe information
- Gender: Female
- Family: Yang Tiexin (foster father)
- Significant other: Yang Kang
- Children: Yang Guo

Mu Nianci
- Chinese: 穆念慈
Transcriptions
Standard Mandarin
- Hanyu Pinyin: Mù Niàncí
Yue: Cantonese
- Jyutping: Muk^{6} Nim^{6}-ci^{4}

Mu Nianci (穆念慈), also known as Mercy Mu in the St. Martin's English translation, is a character in the wuxia novel The Legend of the Condor Heroes by Jin Yong. She is the romantic interest of the antagonist, Yang Kang, and the mother of Yang Guo, the protagonist of the sequel, The Return of the Condor Heroes. Jin Yong describes her appearance as "firm like a piece of jade, despite appearing weather-beaten, she is beautiful, with bright eyes and sparkling white teeth."

== Background ==
Mu Nianci is an amalgamation of the Mu Nianci in the first edition of The Legend of the Condor Heroes and another character, Qin Nanqin (秦南琴). In that edition, Mu Nianci is Yang Kang's romantic partner but not Yang Guo's mother. After Yang Kang is poisoned, Mu Nianci performs a coup de grâce on him, and commits suicide to join him in death.

Qin Nanqin, who lives with her grandfather and catches snakes for a living, has a crush on the protagonist, Guo Jing, after he saves her. However, she is later raped by Yang Kang and becomes pregnant. She gives birth to Yang Guo, and raises him singlehandedly before dying from a venomous snake bite when the boy was about five. Before dying, she entrusts her son to Guo Jing's care.

In the subsequent editions of the novel, Jin Yong merged Mu Nianci and Qin Nanqin into a single character, Mu Nianci.

== Fictional character biography ==
Mu Nianci was from a village on the outskirts of Lin'an Prefecture (present-day Hangzhou), the capital of the Song Empire. After an epidemic killed her family, she was adopted and raised by Yang Tiexin, who had renamed himself "Mu Yi" and wanted to repay the Mu family's kindness for sheltering him earlier when he was injured.

18 years later, Mu Yi and Mu Nianci end up in Kaifeng, the capital of the Jin Empire, where they stage a martial arts contest for interested men to participate in and win Mu Nianci's hand in marriage. A young nobleman, Wanyan Kang, joins the contest and defeats Mu Nianci. Through this encounter, Mu Yi learns that Wanyan Kang's mother, Bao Xiruo, is his long-lost wife and that Wanyan Kang is actually his son, Yang Kang. Mu Yi reveals himself as Yang Tiexin to Bao Xiruo, and the couple reunites. However, Yang Kang refuses to acknowledge his biological father, having been raised as a nobleman all these years by his stepfather Wanyan Honglie. Yang Tiexin and Bao Xiruo ultimately commit suicide after being cornered by Wanyan Honglie and his men.

Mu Nianci attempts to kill Wanyan Honglie to avenge her foster father, but Yang Kang intervenes and stops her. Yang Kang has actually fallen in love with her since they first met, and they develop a romantic relationship. However, their relationship is strained by their conflicting loyalties to the Song and Jin Empires: Yang Kang wants to continue being a Jin nobleman, while Mu Nianci tries to persuade him to give up and live as a commoner with her. Yang Kang reveals his treachery as the story progresses, plotting with his stepfather to destroy the Song Empire while lying to Mu Nianci that he has changed.

Mu Nianci ultimately leaves Yang Kang after realising how incorrigible he is, but she is already pregnant with their child by then, and she still loves Yang Kang in spite of his actions. Shortly after Yang Kang's death, Mu Nianci gives birth to a son, Yang Guo, whom she singlehandedly raises for 11 years before dying of illness. Yang Guo has his mother's body cremated and buried beside his father's remains.

== Martial arts and skills ==
Mu Nianci had learnt the Carefree Fist (逍遙遊) from Hong Qigong in her teenage years, and had been trained in basic martial arts by her foster father Yang Tiexin. Although she is not a powerful martial artist compared to the other main characters in the novel, she has managed to defeat numerous opponents in martial arts contests over the years before she met her match in Yang Kang.

== In adaptations ==
Notable actresses who have portrayed Mu Nianci in films and television series include Kara Hui (1977–1978), Sharon Yeung (1983), Emily Kwan (1994), Jiang Qinqin (2003), Liu Shishi (2008), Zhao Liying (2014), Meng Ziyi (2017) and Huang Yi (2024).

== Family tree ==
Yang Kang and Mu Nianci's family tree

Yang Tiexin | Bao Xiruo | Wanyan Honglie
Yang Kang | Mu Nianci
Yang Guo | Xiaolongnü
Yellow Dress Maiden
