= The Legend of the Condor Heroes =

1957–1959 novel by Jin Yong

- Cover of a 1960s edition of the 1st volume of the novel
- Author: Jin Yong
- Original title: 射鵰英雄傳
- Language: Chinese
- Series: Condor Trilogy
- Genre: Wuxia
- Publisher: Hong Kong Commercial Daily
- Publication date: 1 January 1957 to 19 May 1959
- Publication place: Hong Kong
- Media type: Print
- ISBN: 9786263615878
- Preceded by: Demi-Gods and Semi-Devils
- Followed by: The Return of the Condor Heroes

The Legend of the Condor Heroes
- Traditional Chinese: 射鵰英雄傳
- Simplified Chinese: 射雕英雄传
- Literal meaning: Story of the Eagle Shooting Hero
Transcriptions
Standard Mandarin
- Hanyu Pinyin: Shè Diāo Yīng Xióng Zhuàn
Yue: Cantonese
- Yale Romanization: Seh Diū Yīng Hùhng Jyuhn
- Jyutping: Se^{6} Diu^{1} Jing^{1} Hung^{4} Zyun^{6}

The Legend of the Condor Heroes (射鵰英雄傳) is a wuxia novel by Chinese writer Jin Yong (Louis Cha). It is the first part of the Condor Trilogy and is followed by The Return of the Condor Heroes and The Heaven Sword and Dragon Saber. It was first serialized between 1 January 1957 and 19 May 1959 in the newspaper Hong Kong Commercial Daily. Jin Yong revised the novel twice, first in the 1970s and later in the 2000s.

The English title is somewhat misleading. Diāo means a large bird of prey, and while it can refer to either of the condor species, the Andean condor, or Californian condor, neither is native to China. "Eagle" or "vulture" are sometimes used in more direct translations.

== Plot ==
Set in 12th-century China during the wars between the Jin and Song empires and the rise of the Mongol Empire, the story follows the intertwined fates of two families.

Qiu Chuji, a Taoist priest of the Quanzhen Sect, befriends two warriors – Guo Xiaotian and Yang Tiexin – and helps them name their unborn sons in remembrance of the Jingkang Incident. Soon after, the Jin prince Wanyan Honglie orchestrates an attack on the Guo and Yang families. Guo Xiaotian is killed while Yang Tiexin disappears. Guo Xiaotian's widow, Li Ping, flees to Mongolia, where she gives birth to Guo Jing and raises him under the protection of Genghis Khan. Meanwhile, Yang Tiexin's wife, Bao Xiruo, is taken in by Wanyan Honglie and gives birth to Yang Kang, who is raised as a Jin nobleman.

Years later, Guo Jing grows up in Mongolia. Though slow-witted, he becomes a competent martial artist after undergoing training by the "Seven Freaks of Jiangnan" and other masters. He also earns the favour of Genghis Khan, who betroths him to his daughter Huazheng. Guo Jing eventually travels south and meets Huang Rong, the intelligent daughter of Huang Yaoshi, one of the top five martial artists in the wulin. The two fall in love and go on a series of adventures together.

During his journey, Guo Jing encounters Yang Kang, who has grown up cunning and ambitious. Yang Kang refuses to acknowledge his Han Chinese heritage and aligns himself with his stepfather Wanyan Honglie. Their conflict intensifies after Yang Tiexin and Bao Xiruo are reunited but ultimately die while attempting to escape, leaving Yang Kang further entrenched in his loyalty to the Jin Empire.

While roaming the wulin, Guo Jing and Huang Rong encounter the other top martial artists, including Hong Qigong and Ouyang Feng. They become the former's apprentices, learning his most formidable skills "Eighteen Dragon-Subduing Palms" and "Dog Beating Staff Skill". At one point, Huang Rong even succeeds Hong Qigong as the chief of the Beggar Clan. Meanwhile, a longstanding rivalry over a highly-coveted martial arts manual, the Jiuyin Zhenjing, continues to drive conflicts in the wulin.

Yang Kang's villainy culminates in betrayal and murder. All this time, he has been lying to his romantic partner, Mu Nianci, about his loyalty to the Jin Empire even though he genuinely loves her. His treachery is ultimately exposed and he dies after a failed attempt at hurting Huang Rong, leaving behind Mu Nianci and their unborn son.

Meanwhile, Guo Jing participates in the Mongol invasion of the Khwarazmian Empire and avenges his father by killing Wanyan Honglie. However, when Genghis Khan sets his sights on conquering the Song Empire, Guo Jing refuses to fight for the Khan against his ancestral homeland. After Li Ping sacrifices her life to remind Guo Jing of his heritage, he parts ways with the Mongols and returns to the Song Empire.

The story concludes with Guo Jing and Huang Rong reconciling after various misunderstandings and getting engaged. The couple dedicate themselves to protecting the Song Empire from an impending Mongol invasion, and their story continues in the sequel.

== English translation ==
The novel has been translated into English in four volumes:

1. A Hero Born by Anna Holmwood (2018)
2. A Bond Undone by Gigi Chang (2019)
3. A Snake Lies Waiting by Anna Holmwood and Gigi Chang (2020)
4. A Heart Divided by Gigi Chang and Shelly Bryant (2021)

== Adaptations ==
=== Films ===
Year	Production	Director(s)	Main cast	Additional information
1958	Emei Film Company (Hong Kong)	Wu Pang	Cho Tat-wah, Yung Siu-yee, Lam Kau, Lai Kwan-lin	Story of the Vulture Conqueror
1977	Shaw Brothers Studio (Hong Kong)	Chang Cheh	Alexander Fu, Tien Niu, Lee I-min, Kara Hui	The Brave Archer
1978	Shaw Brothers Studio (Hong Kong)	Chang Cheh	Alexander Fu, Niu-niu, Lee I-min, Kara Hui	The Brave Archer 2
1981	Shaw Brothers Studio (Hong Kong)	Chang Cheh	Alexander Fu, Niu-niu, Yu Tai-ping	The Brave Archer 3
1993	Scholars Limited (Hong Kong)	Jeffrey Lau	Leslie Cheung, Brigitte Lin, Maggie Cheung, Tony Leung Chiu-Wai, Jacky Cheung	The Eagle Shooting Heroes
1994	Scholars Limited (Hong Kong)	Wong Kar-wai	Leslie Cheung, Brigitte Lin, Maggie Cheung, Tony Leung Chiu-Wai, Tony Leung Ka-fai, Jacky Cheung	Ashes of Time
2021	Lajin, Media Asia Film, CFM, M&H Pictures (Mainland China)	Zhu Lingfeng	Eddy Geng, Lin Yurou, Alex To, Eddie Kwan, Lam Chi-chung, Yue Dongfeng	The Legend of the Condor Heroes: The Dragon Tamer
2021	Lajin, Media Asia Film, CFM, M&H Pictures (Mainland China)	Daniel Fu	Kevin Yan, Ruan Ju, Tracy Wang, He Changxi, Tim Huang, Charles Lin	The Legend of the Condor Heroes: The Cadaverous Claw
2025	China Film Group Corporation (Mainland China)	Tsui Hark	Xiao Zhan, Sabrina Zhuang, Tony Leung Ka-fai	Legends of the Condor Heroes: The Gallants

=== Television series ===
Year	Production	Main cast	Additional information
1976	CTV (Hong Kong)	Jason Pai, Michelle Yim, Bruce Leung, Mang Chau	The Legend of the Condor Heroes (1976 TV series)
1983	TVB (Hong Kong)	Felix Wong, Barbara Yung, Michael Miu, Sharon Yeung	The Legend of the Condor Heroes (1983 TV series)
1988	China Television (Taiwan)	Howie Huang, Idy Chan, Poon Wang-ban, Chiu Shu-yi	The Legend of the Condor Heroes (1988 TV series)
1992	TVB (Hong Kong)	Ekin Cheng, Fiona Leung, Gallen Lo, Eddie Kwan, Vivian Chow	Rage and Passion
1993	TVB (Hong Kong)	Julian Cheung, Emily Kwan, David Chiang, Fiona Leung	The Mystery of the Condor Hero
1994	TVB (Hong Kong)	Julian Cheung, Athena Chu, Gallen Lo, Emily Kwan	The Legend of the Condor Heroes (1994 TV series)
1994	TVB (Hong Kong)	Ekin Cheng, Marco Ngai, Wong Siu-yin, Charine Chan, Chan Wai-yee, Wayne Lai	The Condor Heroes Return
1998	Taiwan Television (Taiwan)	Richie Ren, Jacklyn Wu, Sun Xing, Patricia Ha, Ji Qin, June Tsai, Chen Hong, Ben Lee	The Return of the Condor Heroes (1998 Taiwanese TV series)
2003	Ciwen Film & TV Production (Mainland China)	Li Yapeng, Zhou Xun, Zhou Jie, Jiang Qinqin	The Legend of the Condor Heroes (2003 TV series)
2008	Chinese Entertainment Shanghai (Mainland China)	Hu Ge, Ariel Lin, Justin Yuan, Cecilia Liu	The Legend of the Condor Heroes (2008 TV series)
2017	Dragon TV (Mainland China)	Yang Xuwen, Li Yitong, Chen Xingxu, Meng Ziyi, Michael Miu	The Legend of the Condor Heroes (2017 TV series)
2024	Tencent Video (Mainland China)	Ci Sha, Bao Shang'en, Gao Weiguang, Meng Ziyi, Chen Duling, Hankiz Omar	The Legend of Heroes: Hot Blooded (2024 TV series)

=== Comics ===
In 1998, Hong Kong's Ming Ho Press (明河社) published a 38 volume manhua series illustrated by Lee Chi Ching. This was published in Indonesia by MNC Comics in 2000.

=== Video games ===
- Shachou Eiyuuden: The Eagle Shooting Heroes, a 2000–2001 PlayStation RPG, is a video game developed by Sony Computer Entertainment and published in Japan.
- Street Fighter Online: Mouse Generation, a 2008 PC fighting game, includes Mei Chaofeng and Zhou Botong as playable characters.
