= Yang Kang =

Fictional character in the novel The Legend of the Condor Heroes by Jin Yong

- The Legend of the Condor Heroes character
- Yang Kang as illustrated by Lee Chi Ching in the manhua series
- Created by: Jin Yong

In-universe information
- Alias: Wanyan Kang
- Gender: Male
- Affiliation: Quanzhen Sect
- Family: Yang Tiexin (father); Bao Xiruo (mother); Wanyan Honglie (stepfather)
- Significant other: Mu Nianci
- Children: Yang Guo
- Masters: Qiu Chuji; Mei Chaofeng

Yang Kang
- Traditional Chinese: 楊康
- Simplified Chinese: 杨康
Transcriptions
Standard Mandarin
- Hanyu Pinyin: Yáng Kāng
Yue: Cantonese
- Jyutping: Joeng^{4} Hong^{1}

Yang Kang (楊康) is the fictional antagonist of the wuxia novel The Legend of the Condor Heroes by Jin Yong. He also serves as a foil to Guo Jing, the protagonist, as they share the same background. They were named by the Quanzhen priest Qiu Chuji to remind them of the Jingkang Incident and to be loyal to the Song Empire. He is also the father of Yang Guo, the protagonist of the sequel The Return of the Condor Heroes.

== Fictional character biography ==
Yang Kang's father, Yang Tiexin, was a descendant of the Song general Yang Zaixing and was originally from Shandong before he settled in Niu Family Village on the outskirts of Lin'an Prefecture (present-day Hangzhou), the capital of the Song Empire. Two years after Yang Tiexin married Bao Xiruo from a neighbouring village, he was apparently killed when soldiers raided the village. Bao Xiruo, who was pregnant with Yang Kang then, was saved by Wanyan Honglie, the sixth prince of the Jin Empire. Thinking that Yang Tiexin was dead, Bao Xiruo became Wanyan Honglie's princess consort, and Yang Kang was raised as Wanyan Honglie's son under the name "Wanyan Kang".

Yang Kang eventually learns about his background when Yang Tiexin, who had survived the raid, reunites with Bao Xiruo by chance. When Bao Xiruo tries to explain the situation to Yang Kang, the boy refuses to acknowledge Yang Tiexin as his father. Instead, he sees Wanyan Honglie as his father who raised him in the past 18 years. Unknown to him, Wanyan Honglie was the one who bribed the soldiers to attack the village. Yang Tiexin and Bao Xiruo ultimately commit suicide after being cornered by Wanyan Honglie and his men.

Yang Kang meets Guo Jing, his sworn brother who tries to convince him to leave the Jin Empire and serve the Song Empire. Although Yang Kang initially agrees, he changes his mind after witnessing corruption and cowardice in the Song Empire. Outwardly, he pretends to be loyal to the Song Empire, while secretly plotting with Wanyan Honglie to destroy the Song Empire and help his stepfather become the Jin emperor. His treachery is gradually unveiled throughout the novel. At one point, he betrays and stabs Guo Jing. Later, he murders Ouyang Ke so that he can take the latter's place as Ouyang Feng's heir. He is also responsible for killing five of the "Seven Freaks of Jiangnan", who had trained Guo Jing in martial arts.

Yang Kang first meets his romantic partner, Mu Nianci, when he defeats her in a martial arts contest and refuses to honour his agreement to marry her. Although their relationship is strained due to their conflicting loyalties to the Song and Jin Empires, they genuinely love each other. Mu Nianci ultimately leaves Yang Kang after recognising his treachery, but she is already pregnant with his child, Yang Guo.

Yang Kang ultimately gets his retribution in the Temple of the Iron Spear in Jiaxing. Huang Rong is about to reveal the truth behind Ouyang Ke's death when Yang Kang attacks her with a palm strike in an attempt to silence her. However, he accidentally hits her spiked armoured vest, which has incidentally been stained with a deadly venom. The venom seeps into his body through his wounds and eventually kills him. His corpse is devoured by crows before it is buried by Guo Jing and Qiu Chuji, and the latter writes on the headstone, "Yang Kang, an unworthy apprentice. This headstone is erected by his untalented master, Qiu Chuji."

== Martial arts and skills ==
Yang Kang was initially trained in martial arts by Qiu Chuji of the Quanzhen Sect to prepare him for an upcoming martial arts contest with Guo Jing, who was trained by Qiu's rivals, the "Seven Freaks of Jiangnan". He also partially learnt the Yang Family Spear Movement (楊家槍法) used by his biological father. Later, he meets Mei Chaofeng by chance and learns the Nine Yin White Bone Claw (九陰白骨爪) from her.

== In adaptations ==
Notable actors who have portrayed Yang Kang in films and television series include Bruce Leung (1976), Michael Miu (1983), Gallen Lo (1994), Zhou Jie (2003), Yuan Hong (2008), Chen Xingxu (2017) and Wang Hongyi (2024).

== Family tree ==
Yang Kang and Mu Nianci's family tree

Yang Tiexin	Bao Xiruo	Wanyan Honglie
Yang Kang	Mu Nianci
Yang Guo	Xiaolongnü
Yellow Dress Maiden
