= Beggar Clan =

Fictional martial arts sect

- Traditional Chinese: 丐幫
- Simplified Chinese: 丐帮
Transcriptions
Standard Mandarin
- Hanyu Pinyin: Gaì Bāng
Yue: Cantonese
- Jyutping: Koi^{3} Bong^{1}

The Beggar Clan or Beggar Sect (丐幫) is a fictional martial arts organisation featured in works of wuxia fiction by writers such as Jin Yong, Gu Long and Wolong Sheng. The clan has also found its way into martial arts films such as King of Beggars and video games such as Age of Wushu. As its name suggests, the clan's members are mostly beggars, although some of them are from other walks of life. They are noticeable in public for their dress code and behaviour. The members adhere to a strict code of conduct and maintain the utmost respect for rank and hierarchy. They uphold justice and help those in need through acts of chivalry. The Beggar Clan is also one of the supporting pillars in the defence of the Han Chinese nation from foreign invaders. The clan has a wide network of communications and the members are reputed for their excellent information gathering skills. This is due to the clan's large size and the nature of its members, which allows them to easily blend into different segments of society.

== History ==
The clan was founded during the Han dynasty and has survived for centuries. The clan plays significant roles in novels such as Demi-Gods and Semi-Devils and the Condor Trilogy, which are set in a time frame from the 10th to 13th century in China.

The Beggar Clan was one of the largest and most highly-regarded martial arts organisations in the wulin (martial artists' community) until the 13th century, when its fame and popularity began to decline due to ill discipline among its members and incompetent leadership.

== Organisation ==
The clan is divided into various groups, including the "dirty clothing" group (污衣派) comprising typical beggars and the "clean clothing" group (淨衣派) which is made up of non-beggar members. It has many branches (分舵) spread throughout the land and each of them is headed by a branch master (舵主).

Each member carries at least one pouch-like bag and the number of bags he/she carries indicates his/her rank in the clan. The highest rank a member can attain is that of an elder, who is second only to the chief. Elders carry nine bags each.

The clan is headed by a chief (幫主), who represents the highest authority in the clan. Each chief is selected from a pool of nominees based on his/her prowess in martial arts, contributions to the clan, personal conduct, and popularity, among other qualities. The chief carries the revered Dog Beating Staff (打狗棒) as a symbol of leadership. The clan has various practices and customs, such as the one which allows all members to spit once on a newly elected chief as a form of salute.

The Four Great Elders serve as the chief's deputies and reserve the right to strip the chief off his post if he/she fails in his/her duties. Besides, there are also elders with designated duties, such as the Discipline Elder (執法長老), who enforces law and order in the clan, and the Training Elder (傳功長老), who oversees the martial arts training of members.

The clan holds monthly meetings in a different location each time.

== Skills and martial arts ==
The most notable martial arts of the Beggar Clan are the Eighteen Dragon-Subduing Palms (降龍十八掌) (Note: Also translated as Eighteen Palms to Defeat the Dragon) and the Dog Beating Staff Technique (打狗棒法). The chief is expected to have a profound mastery of both skills, especially the latter, which is only passed on from a chief to his/her successor. No other member knows the Dog Beating Staff Technique. The clan has a battle formation known as the Dog Beating Formation (打狗陣).

Since members are not limited to only beggars, people from all walks of life, including scholars and soldiers, join the clan. As such, the clan's martial arts are rather diverse, since some members have learnt other forms of martial arts prior to joining the clan. For example, Wu Changfeng in Demi-Gods and Semi-Devils uses a customised saber movement while Chen Guyan carries a sack filled with poisonous creatures for use against enemies.
