= Huang Yaoshi =

Fictional character in the Condor Trilogy by Jin Yong

- Condor Trilogy character
- Huang Yaoshi in the 2021 mobile game The Legend of the Condor Heroes
- Created by: Jin Yong

In-universe information
- Nicknames: "Eastern Heretic"; "Old Heretic Huang"
- Gender: Male
- Affiliation: Peach Blossom Island
- Family: Guo Jing (son-in-law); Guo Fu (granddaughter); Guo Xiang (granddaughter); Guo Polu (grandson)
- Spouse: Feng Heng
- Children: Huang Rong
- Apprentices: Chen Xuanfeng; Mei Chaofeng; Qu Lingfeng; Wu Mianfeng; Lu Chengfeng; Feng Mofeng; Lu Guanying; Shagu; Cheng Ying

Huang Yaoshi
- Traditional Chinese: 黃藥師
- Simplified Chinese: 黄药师
Transcriptions
Standard Mandarin
- Hanyu Pinyin: Huáng Yàoshī
Yue: Cantonese
- Jyutping: Wong^{4} Joek^{6}-si^{1}

Huang Yaoshi (黃藥師), also known as Apothecary Huang in the St. Martin's translation, is a fictional character in the wuxia novel The Legend of the Condor Heroes and its sequel, The Return of the Condor Heroes, by Jin Yong. He is one of the "Five Greats", the five most powerful martial artists in the wulin (martial artists' community), alongside Wang Chongyang, Hong Qigong, Ouyang Feng and Duan Zhixing. Nicknamed "Eastern Heretic", he is known for being an unorthodox radical who behaves as he wishes without showing any regard for formalities or moral ethics. He loathes the dogma of traditional rites in Chinese society and admires only genuine honour and pure love. As such, he is often regarded by his contemporaries as a cultural heretic. His nickname may be translated to "Eastern Evil" because the character xie (邪) in his nickname also refers to "evil" and "unorthodoxy".

== Fictional character biography ==
Huang Yaoshi is the master of Peach Blossom Island and one of the "Five Greats", the five most powerful martial artists in the wulin. Known for being a loner who harbours "heretical" views on traditional Chinese social norms, he is nicknamed "Eastern Heretic" and his eccentric personality makes him a much dreaded figure in the wulin. He married Feng Heng, who died shortly after giving birth to their daughter, Huang Rong. He has six apprentices: Qu Lingfeng, Chen Xuanfeng, Mei Chaofeng, Lu Chengfeng, Wu Mianfeng and Feng Mofeng.

Huang Yaoshi makes his first appearance when he is searching for Huang Rong, who has left home after a quarrel with her father. He meets Guo Jing, whom his daughter is romantically attracted to, and learns about the fates of his six apprentices. Chen Xuanfeng had been killed by Guo Jing; Mei Chaofeng has been blinded but still retains her fighting prowess; Qu Lingfeng and Wu Mianfeng are dead; Feng Mofeng is missing; and Lu Chengfeng, now a cripple, has settled in a manor on Lake Tai. Huang Yaoshi takes Qu Lingfeng's daughter Shagu and Lu Chengfeng's son Lu Guanying as his grand-apprentices.

As the story progresses, Guo Jing visits Peach Blossom Island with his master Hong Qigong to compete for Huang Rong's hand-in-marriage against Ouyang Ke, Ouyang Feng's nephew. Guo Jing also meets Zhou Botong, who has been in a 15-year conflict with Huang Yaoshi over the Jiuyin Zhenjing. Huang Yaoshi sets a series of tests for Guo Jing and Ouyang Ke. Guo Jing wins, much to Huang Yaoshi's chagrin because he dislikes Guo Jing, who is a slow learner. However, he ultimately gives his blessings to his daughter and Guo Jing after the boy proves his worth and shows that he truly loves Huang Rong.

Huang Yaoshi makes brief appearances in the sequel. He rescues Cheng Ying from Li Mochou and takes the girl as his apprentice. He also develops a special bond with Yang Guo, the protagonist, as they share the same distaste for the social norms of their time, and he teaches Yang Guo two of his most powerful skills. Huang Yaoshi also joins his daughter and son-in-law in defending the city of Xiangyang from Mongol invaders. At the end of the novel, he retains his position as the "Eastern Heretic" of the new "Five Greats".

== Martial arts and skills ==
Besides being one of the top five martial artists in the wulin, Huang Yaoshi is a polymath well-versed in multiple fields including geography, medicine, strategy, mathematics, music, literature, and the Qimen Dunjia. He adopts an eclectic approach towards martial arts, creating a wide range of skills that incorporate elements from other fields. These include the Jade Waves Palm (碧波掌法), Qimen Five Turns (奇門五轉), the qinggong Holy Turtle Steps (靈鰲步), Fallen Hero Divine Sword Palm (落英神劍掌), Whirlwind Leaf-Sweeping Kick (旋風掃葉腿), the dianxue technique Orchid Acupuncture Point Brushing Hand (蘭花拂穴手), and Jade Leaking Silver Pushing Sword (玉漏催銀劍).

Huang Yaoshi's best known skill is the Finger-Flicking Skill (彈指神通), which allows him to channel his immense neigong into his fingers and propel objects with great force and accuracy. He also carries a jade xiao, which he sometimes uses like a sword to perform dianxue techniques, but mostly plays it while integrating his neigong into the sound waves to shock his opponents.

== In adaptations ==
Notable actors who have portrayed Huang Yaoshi in films and television series include Shih Kien (1958), Michael Chan (1976), Kenneth Tsang (1983), David Chiang (1993), Leslie Cheung (1993), Tony Leung Ka-fai (1994), Felix Lok (1994), Chen Shucheng (1998), Yu Chenghui (2006), Anthony Wong (2008), Christopher Lee (2014), Michael Miu (2017) and Eddie Kwan (2021).
