= Jiuyin Zhenjing =

Fictional book in the Condor Trilogy by Jin Yong

- Traditional Chinese: 九陰真經
- Simplified Chinese: 九阴真经
Transcriptions
Standard Mandarin
- Hanyu Pinyin: Jiǔ Yīn Zhēn Jīng
Yue: Cantonese
- Yale Romanization: Gáu Yām Jān Gīng
- Jyutping: Gau^{2} Jam^{1} Zan^{1} Ging^{1}
- IPA: [kɐw˧˥jɐm˥tsɐn˥kɪŋ˥]

The Jiuyin Zhenjing (九陰真經), translated as the Nine Yin Manual or Novem Scripture, is a fictional martial arts manual in the Condor Trilogy, a trilogy of wuxia novels by Jin Yong. Within the trilogy, it is highly coveted in the wulin (martial artists' community), serving as a plot device and central object of conflict across the trilogy. In the trilogy, the manual is a comprehensive treatise on martial arts, integrating internal cultivation (neigong) and external techniques. Its reputed ability to elevate a practitioner's skills makes it highly sought after by numerous characters, and its circulation among the characters drives the key events in the novels.

The Jiuyang Zhenjing, another martial arts manual which focuses on neigong, is considered the yang counterpart to the Jiuyin Zhenjing and appears mainly in The Heaven Sword and Dragon Saber, the third instalment of the trilogy.

== Description ==
In the novels, the Jiuyin Zhenjing is divided into two volumes. The first focuses on internal cultivation (neigong) grounded in Taoist principles, while the second records a wide range of external techniques.

Part of the first volume is presented in Sanskrit rendered through Chinese transliteration, emphasising the balance of yin and yang energies, and the integration of neijia and waijia (internal and external practices). Mastery of the neigong techniques from the first volume is a prerequisite for safely learning the external forms described in the second volume.

The second volume includes external techniques associated with both "orthodox" and "unorthodox" martial arts traditions in the wulin. In the novels, some of these skills – especially the "unorthodox" ones – are described to be dangerous when practised without a proper neigong foundation. It serves as a recurring theme across the trilogy about the relationship between power, discipline, and moral alignment.

== Fictional history ==
In the novels, the manual was compiled in the early 12th century by Huang Chang (黃裳). After studying multiple Taoist texts and martial arts, he recorded a wide range of fighting skills, the counter-moves, neigong cultivation techniques, etc. His work culminated in the creation of the manual as a compendium of his accumulated knowledge.

After Huang Chang's death, the manual was lost initially. Later, it reemerged in the wulin and became a highly coveted object among martial artists and clans seeking to achieve supremacy. To resolve the dispute over ownership, the leading figures of the wulin convened a martial arts contest on Mount Hua. Wang Chongyang, the founder of the Quanzhen Sect, emerged victorious and claimed the manual. He subsequently prohibited his followers from studying it.

After Wang Chongyang's death, the manual was divided, copied, and misinterpreted as it passed through the hands of various individuals such as Huang Yaoshi, Ouyang Feng, Chen Xuanfeng, and Mei Chaofeng. In some cases (like in the last three cases), incomplete understanding of the principles in the first volume led to practitioners using distorted or harmful forms of the skills in the second volume.

The manual ultimately comes into the possession of Guo Jing, the protagonist of The Legend of the Condor Heroes. He is one of the few characters who are able to successfully integrate the manual's teachings and improve their prowess in martial arts. Elements of the text are subsequently preserved or concealed, including within the Heaven-Reliant Sword as mentioned in The Heaven Sword and Dragon Saber.

== Scholarly studies ==
The Jiuyin Zhenjing has attracted attention in scholarly studies of wuxia literature, in which it is interpreted as a plot device representing the synthesis of martial arts philosophy, Taoist thought, and moral order.

Scholars such as John Christopher Hamm note that martial arts manuals in Jin Yong's novels function as more than just technical texts. They also symbolise authority over cultural knowledge and legitimacy in the wulin. In this context, the Jiuyin Zhenjing represents both the pinnacle of martial prowess and the potential dangers of misusing martial arts, particularly when there is the absence of an ethical foundation.

Similarly, Anna Holmwood and Jianying Zha observed that Jin Yong's novels integrate elements of traditional Chinese philosophy into narratives. The Jiuyin Zhenjing's emphasis on balancing yin and yang and harmonising neijia and waijia shows how broader themes in Taoist and classical Chinese thought are adapted into a fictional framework. Within this framework, the division between "orthodox" and "unorthodox" martial arts can be interpreted as an exploration of the relationship between power and ethics. The manual's structure, which juxtaposes internal cultivation with external techniques, reinforces the idea that technical mastery without moral grounding leads to instability or self-destruction.

Scholars also interpret the widespread conflict over the manual as a reflection of power struggles, with the wulin serving as an allegorical space for contesting authority and legitimacy. As Hamm noted, such power struggles over achieving supremacy in martial prowess mirror historical concerns with the control and transmission of cultural capital in Chinese society.

In a 2012 article published in the Taiwan Medical Journal, traditional Chinese medicine (TCM) physician and scholar Zhou Minlang (周敏郎), argued that the Jiuyin Zhenjing can serve as a metaphor for understanding TCM principles, particularly the concept of combining herbs.
