= Ouyang Feng =

Fictional character in the Condor Trilogy by Jin Yong

- Condor Trilogy character
- Ouyang Feng in the 2021 mobile game The Legend of the Condor Heroes
- Created by: Jin Yong

In-universe information
- Nicknames: "Western Venom; "Old Venomous Creature"
- Gender: Male
- Affiliation: White Camel Mountain Manor
- Family: Ouyang Ke (son); Yang Guo (godson)

Ouyang Feng
- Traditional Chinese: 歐陽鋒
- Simplified Chinese: 欧阳锋
Transcriptions
Standard Mandarin
- Hanyu Pinyin: Ōuyáng Fēng
Yue: Cantonese
- Jyutping: Au^{1}-joeng^{4} Fung^{1}

Ouyang Feng (歐陽鋒), also known as Viper Ouyang in the St. Martin's translation, is a fictional character in the wuxia novel The Legend of the Condor Heroes and its sequel, The Return of the Condor Heroes, by Jin Yong. He is the "Western Venom" of the "Five Greats", the five most powerful martial artists in the wulin (martial artists' community), alongside Wang Chongyang, Hong Qigong, Huang Yaoshi and Duan Zhixing. Ouyang Feng is best known for his Toad Skill, and his expertise in toxicology. In the first novel, he is described as a ruthless villain who resorts to unscrupulous means to become the most powerful martial artist in the wulin. He attempts to seize the Jiuyin Zhenjing, a book detailing powerful skills, but is tricked into practising skills based on a corrupted version of the manual. He ends up in a state of zouhuorumo and becomes insane eventually, but ironically his neigong has also improved tremendously. In the sequel, Ouyang Feng takes the protagonist, Yang Guo, as his godson and teaches him the Toad Skill. Later, he dies in the midst of laughter and forgotten past feuds alongside Hong Qigong, and they are buried on Mount Hua.

== Fictional character biography ==
Ouyang Feng is the master of a manor on White Camel Mountain (白駝山) in the Western Regions. He specialises in toxicology and rears venomous snakes as pets. He participated in the first martial arts contest held on Mount Hua, emerged as one of the top five champions, and earned himself the nickname "Western Venom" (西毒).

Ouyang Feng makes his first appearance in The Legend of the Condor Heroes while visiting Peach Blossom Island with his nephew, Ouyang Ke, to arrange for a marriage between Ouyang Ke and Huang Yaoshi's daughter, Huang Rong. However, the protagonist Guo Jing contends with Ouyang Ke for Huang Rong's hand-in-marriage, with Zhou Botong and Hong Qigong supporting him. After a competition involving three rounds of tests between the two young men, Guo Jing wins the contest but incurs the displeasure of the Ouyangs.

Later in the novel, Hong Qigong, Zhou Botong and Guo Jing are stranded at sea and picked up by Ouyang Feng's ship. When Ouyang Feng realises that Guo Jing has memorised the Jiuyin Zhenjing, he attempts to con and coerce him into writing a copy. However, acting on Hong Qigong's suggestion, Guo Jing writes a corrupted version of the manual for Ouyang Feng, with some verses written in reverse. Ouyang Feng believes that he has gotten what he wants and tries to kill Guo Jing and Hong Qigong. Hong Qigong and Ouyang Feng fight on the ship, which sinks. Hong Qigong was poisoned by Ouyang Feng during the fight and loses all his neigong after using it to purge the venom from his body. The now powerless Hong Qigong, accompanied by Guo Jing and Huang Rong, are at the mercy of the Ouyangs, because the five of them are stranded on an island. Huang Rong tricks Ouyang Ke into loosening a boulder, which falls and crushes his leg. Ouyang Feng forces the three of them to look after his nephew and provide them with food. In return, he promises not to harm them as long as they are still on the island. At one point, Ouyang Feng reveals that he is actually Ouyang Ke's father. The Ouyangs are eventually picked up by Wanyan Honglie's ship.

After leaving the island, Ouyang Feng practises the Jiuyin Zhenjing obsessively since he believes that the copy Guo Jing gave him is genuine. He kidnaps Huang Rong and tries to force her to interpret the verses for him, but she provides him with wrong information, without him knowing that he has been deceived. At the end of the novel, Ouyang Feng ends up in a zouhuorumo state and becomes insane, but ironically his neigong has improved tremendously.

Ouyang Feng makes a few brief appearances in the sequel. He is now insane and meets Yang Guo, whom he takes as his godson and teaches the Toad Skill to. Ouyang Feng appears again when Yang Guo and Xiaolongnü are practising martial arts in the Zhongnan Mountains. Ouyang Feng wants to teach Yang Guo some skills but does not want Xiaolongnü to overhear him so he immobilises her. He enters a fit of insanity later and leaves.

Ouyang Feng appears one last time on Mount Hua, where he meets Yang Guo and Hong Qigong again. He fights with Hong Qigong – this time for a period of four days. The fight is interrupted when Yang Guo comes at intervals to serve them meals. The animosity between the two rivals is too strong for them to bear and they continue to pit their neigong against each other for a full day. Both of them suffer from exhaustion but they are unwilling to back down. They decide to use Yang Guo, who has been an observer for the past few days, as an intermediary. They teach him their respective skills and ask him to perform for each other to see.

Hong Qigong teaches Yang Guo his Dog Beating Staff Technique. Ouyang Feng has apparently lost after Yang Guo performed the last stance. Ouyang Feng spends the following night thinking of a countermove. The next morning, he asks Yang Guo to perform for Hong Qigong, who is shocked when he sees that Ouyang Feng has overcome his most powerful skill. Hong Qigong finally realises that there will be no eventual victor between the two of them. He laughs hysterically and embraces Ouyang Feng in defeat. At the same time, Ouyang Feng seems to have recovered from his insanity as he finally recognises Hong Qigong. The two rivals die together in the midst of laughter and forgotten past feuds. Yang Guo buries them side by side on Mount Hua.

== Martial arts and skills ==
Ouyang Feng is best known for his most powerful skill, the Toad Skill (蛤蟆功). The practitioner gets into a crouching position, croaking like a toad while preparing to channel his neigong into a single, powerful strike when he senses a weakness in his opponent's movement.

Ouyang Feng is also known for his formidable qinggong and other skills such as the Divine Serpent Fist (靈蛇拳), Divine Camel Snowy Mountain Palm (神駝雪山掌), and Bone Penetrating Dianxue Skill (透骨打穴法). He wields an iron staff with a venomous snake perched on it.

After getting the corrupted version of the Jiuyin Zhenjing and believing it to be genuine, he practises its neigong techniques compulsively, ends up in a zouhuorumo state, and eventually becomes insane. Ironically, his neigong has improved tremendously.

== In adaptations ==
Notable actors who have portrayed Ouyang Feng in films and television series include Yeung Chak-lam (1976, 1983), Lo Lieh (1983), Tony Leung Chiu-wai (1993), Leslie Cheung (1994), Chu Tit-wo (1994), Richard Low (1998), You Yong (2003), Elvis Tsui (2008), Zong Fengyan (2014), Heizi (2017), Alex To (2021), Vengo Gao (2024), Bruce Leung and Tony Leung Ka-fai (2025).
