= Duan Zhixing =

Emperor Xuanzong of Dali 大理宣宗
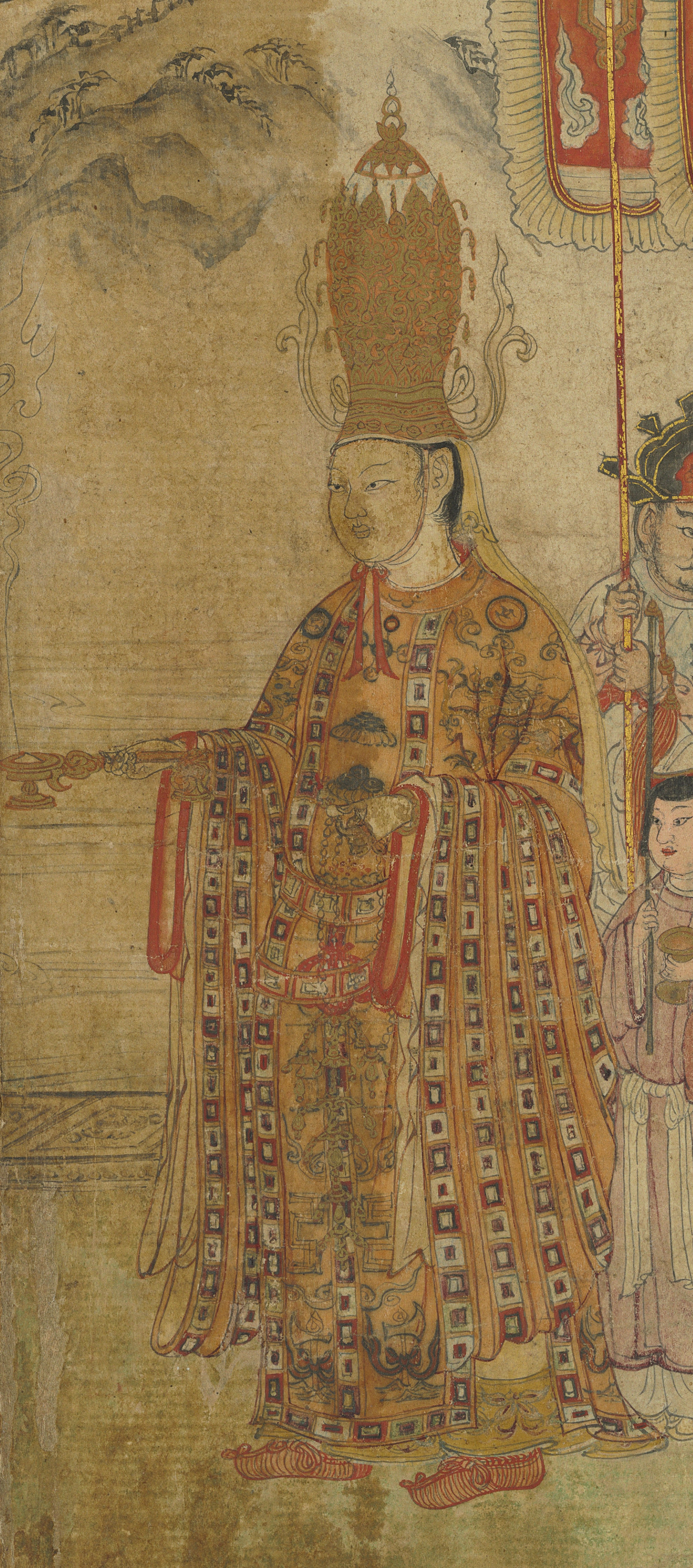

Emperor of Dali
- Reign: 1172–1200
- Predecessor: Duan Zhengxing
- Successor: Duan Zhilian
- Regents: Gao Shouchang (高壽昌) (1172–1174); Gao Zhenming (高貞明) (1174); Gao Shouchang (高壽昌) (1174–1176); Gao Guanyinmiao (高觀音妙) (1176–1189); Gao Guanyinzheng (高觀音政) (1189–1200)
- Died: 1200
- Issue: Duan Zhilian
Names
- Family name: Duan (段); Given name: Zhixing (智興)
Era dates
- Lizhen (1172–1175); Shengde (1176–1180); Jiahui (1181–1184); Yuanheng (1185–1195); Anding (1195–1200)
Posthumous name
- Emperor Gongji (功極皇帝)
Temple name
- Xuanzong (宣宗)
- Dynasty: Dali
- Father: Duan Zhengxing

Duan Zhixing (Chinese: 段智興, died 1200), also known by his temple name as the Emperor Xuanzong of Dali, was the 18th emperor of the Dali Kingdom between 1172 and 1200. Duan Zhixing's reign was marred by the power struggles within the influential Gao family, whose power had long eclipsed the ruling Duan family.

== Reign ==
In 1174, Gao Guanyinlong (高觀音隆) removed Gao Shouchang (高壽昌), the Duke of Zhong (中國公), from power and replaced him with Gao Zhenming (高貞明; Gao Shouchang's nephew). In November, Aji (阿機; Gao Mingqing's grandson) rebelled and ousted Gao Zhenming, restoring Gao Shouchang back to his grand chancellor position. Gao Zhenming then occupied Heqing (鶴慶) and proclaimed himself the Duke of Ming (明國公). (In 1190, Gao Zhenming died and was given the posthumous name Emperor Yidi Weitian Congming Ren 義地威天聰明仁帝) Two years later (1176), Gao Guanyinlong's son, Gao Guanyinmiao, rebelled in Baiya (白崖), made himself grand chancellor, and deposed Gao Shouchang. Soon after, Gao Guanyinmiao died, and the position of grand chancellor was succeeded by his younger brother, Gao Guanyinzheng.

Duan initiated several construction projects in Dali. Being a devout Buddhist like his predecessors, he repaired 16 Buddhist temples in 1190. In 1195, he ordered the building of defensive infrastructure at crucial entry points into Dali. Five years later, he died and was succeeded by his son, Duan Zhilian (段智廉).

== Era names ==
Duan Zhixing had five era names in the twenty-eight years of his reign.

- Lizhen (利貞; 1172–1175)
- Shengde (盛德; 1176–1180)
- Jiahui (嘉會; 1181–1184)
- Yuanheng (元亨; 1185–1196?)
- Anding (安定; 1197–1200)

== In fiction ==
Duan Zhixing is fictionalised as a character in the wuxia novels The Legend of the Condor Heroes and The Return of the Condor Heroes by Jin Yong. In the novels, Duan Zhixing was the ruler of Dali and one of the "Five Greats", the five most powerful martial artists in the wulin (martial artists' community), alongside Wang Chongyang, Huang Yaoshi, Ouyang Feng and Hong Qigong. His nickname was "Southern Emperor" (南帝) and his most powerful skill is the Yiyang Finger (一陽指), which allows him to project streams of energy from his fingers. He also learnt the First Heaven Skill (先天功), a neigong technique, from Wang Chongyang in exchange for teaching the latter the Yiyang Finger.

When the events of the first novel take place, Duan Zhixing has abdicated and become a Buddhist monk known as "Reverend Yideng" (一燈大師). He makes his first appearance when the protagonists Guo Jing and Huang Rong seek help from him after Huang is critically wounded, and he uses his immense neigong to heal Huang of her internal injuries. Towards the end of the novel, he shows up again to subdue the villainous Qiu Qianren, whom he saves from death and takes as an apprentice to reform him.

Yideng makes brief appearances in the second novel. By then, Dali has been conquered by the Mongol Empire as part of the Mongol conquest of China. Yideng appears in Passionless Valley to help the protagonists Yang Guo and Xiaolongnü deal with the villains Gongsun Zhi and Qiu Qianchi, and briefly participates in the Battle of Xiangyang against the Mongols. At the end of the novel, he retains his position as one of the "Five Greats" in the wulin but his nickname changes to "Southern Monk" (南僧).

== Notes ==
| Preceded by Duan Zhengxing | Emperor of Dali; 1172 AD–1200 AD | Succeeded by Duan Zhilian |
