= Taohua Island =

Island in Zhejiang, China

Coordinates: 29°49′N 122°16′E

- Traditional Chinese: 桃花島
- Simplified Chinese: 桃花岛
- Literal meaning: Peach Blossom Island
Transcriptions

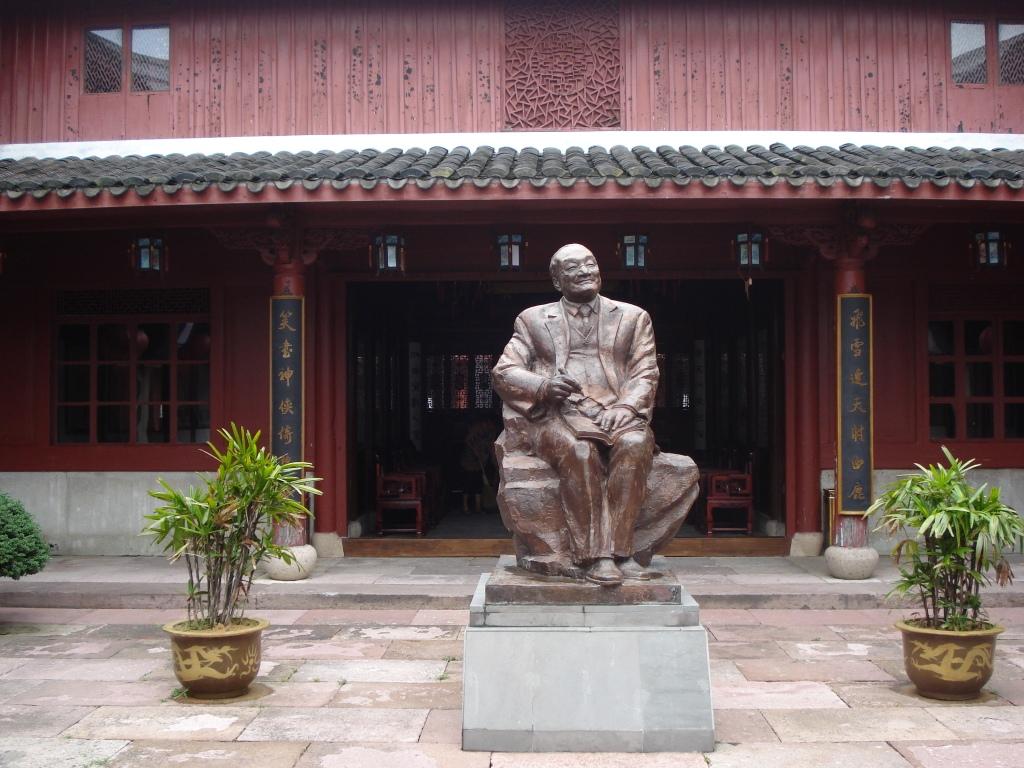
Statue of Louis Cha on Taohua Island

Taohua Island is one of the islands of the Zhoushan Archipelago. The island is under the administration of Putuo District, Zhoushan, Zhejiang, China.

The island is mentioned many times in Louis Cha's Condor Trilogy, therefore gaining its popularity.

== Tourist attraction ==
- The statue of Louis Cha, built in 2001
- Shengyan Monastery (at highest peak of the island; Anqi Mountain. Reachable by car from south side or by foot via a pretty tough path starting in the AAAA tourist attraction park)
- Jilin Pagoda (7 floors, 38 meters high; part of the AAAA tourist attraction park)
