= Guo Jing =

Fictional character in the Condor Trilogy by Jin Yong

- Condor Trilogy character
- Guo Jing as illustrated by Lee Chi Ching in the manhua series
- First appearance: The Legend of the Condor Heroes; 1 January 1957
- Created by: Jin Yong

In-universe information
- Nickname: "Northern Hero" (北俠)
- Gender: Male
- Affiliation: Quanzhen Sect; Beggar Clan; Peach Blossom Island
- Family: Guo Xiaotian (father); Li Ping (mother); Huang Yaoshi (father-in-law); Feng Heng (mother-in-law)
- Spouse: Huang Rong
- Children: Guo Fu; Guo Xiang; Guo Polu
- Sworn siblings: Yang Kang; Tolui; Zhou Botong
- Masters: Seven Freaks of Jiangnan; Jebe; Hong Qigong; Ma Yu; Zhou Botong
- Apprentices: Wu Dunru; Wu Xiuwen; Yang Guo; Yelü Qi

Guo Jing
- Chinese: 郭靖
Transcriptions
Standard Mandarin
- Hanyu Pinyin: Guō Jìng
Yue: Cantonese
- Jyutping: Gwok^{3} Zing^{6}

Guo Jing (郭靖) is the fictional protagonist of the wuxia novel The Legend of the Condor Heroes by Jin Yong. He also appears as a supporting character in the sequel, The Return of the Condor Heroes, and mentioned by name in The Heaven Sword and Dragon Saber. He is a descendant of Guo Sheng, one of the 108 Stars of Destiny in the classical novel Water Margin. Guo Jing and Yang Kang were both named by Qiu Chuji, who urges them to remember the Jingkang Incident and be loyal to the Song Empire. Guo Jing is killed during the Battle of Xiangyang along with the rest of his family except his younger daughter, Guo Xiang.

== Fictional character biography ==
Guo Jing's father, Guo Xiaotian, was originally from Shandong before he settled in Niu Family Village on the outskirts of Lin'an Prefecture (present-day Hangzhou), the capital of the Song Empire. He was killed by soldiers during a raid on the village. His wife, Li Ping, who was pregnant with Guo Jing then, fled north and eventually settled in Mongolia, where Guo Jing was born. Guo Jing and his mother later join Genghis Khan's tribe. The boy grows up under the Khan's care, becomes anda (sworn brothers) with the Khan's fourth son Tolui, and shows his loyalty to the Khan by fending off his enemies. In return, the Khan sees Guo Jing like a son and betroths his daughter, Huazheng, to him.

At the age of 18, Guo Jing leaves for the Song Empire to meet Yang Kang for a martial arts contest arranged before his birth by his masters, the "Seven Freaks of Jiangnan", and the Quanzhen priest Qiu Chuji. During this time, he encounters some of the five most powerful martial artists in the wulin and learns from them. Through his experiences, he matures into a loyal, upright young hero with formidable fighting skills and a capable military leader. He also meets Huang Rong, whom he goes on adventures with and eventually marries.

Following his adventures in China, he returns to Mongolia and participates in the Mongol campaign against the Khwarezmid Empire. Upon learning that the Mongols are planning to invade the Song Empire, he plans to leave Mongolia with his mother, but they are discovered. After his mother commits suicide to remind him that his loyalty should be with the Song Empire, he flees and only returns to see the Khan one last time before the Khan's death.

In The Return of the Condor Heroes, set several years after the first novel, the adult Guo Jing has become a prominent figure in the wulin and a highly-regarded hero in the Song Empire for his efforts in protecting the city of Xiangyang from Mongol invaders. He also serves as a mentor figure to Yang Kang's son Yang Guo, hoping to guide the boy towards the path of goodness and redeem his family's honour. He and Huang Rong also have three children: elder daughter Guo Fu, and the twins Guo Xiang and Guo Polu. He also accepts Reverend Yideng's apprentice Wu Santong's sons, Wu Dunru and Wu Xiuwen, as his apprentices and raises them after their father went missing.

It is revealed in The Heaven Sword and Dragon Saber that all the Guos except Guo Xiang were killed during the Battle of Xiangyang, and Guo Jing and Huang Rong are remembered in the wulin as national martyrs. Guo Xiang continued roaming the jianghu as a knight-errant fighting injustice and helping the poor before eventually founding the Emei Sect.

== Character description ==
Guo Jing has thick eyebrows, large eyes, a sturdy and strong stature, and a complexion somewhere between dark and fair. He is described to be "dumb" during his youth, a slow learner who needs repetition, practice, and patience to process acquired knowledge. His most outstanding trait is his constant strife for moral rectitude, as seen when he faces a dilemma after Genghis Khan attempts to force him to lead the Mongols to attack the Song Empire. Although he was born and raised in Mongolia, he is unwilling to side with the Mongols to attack the Song Empire. In The Return of the Condor Heroes, the adult Guo Jing dedicates his life to defending the Song Empire from the Mongol invaders.

== Martial arts and skills ==
In The Return of the Condor Heroes, Guo Jing becomes one of the "Five Greats" – the five most powerful martial artists in the wulin – as the "Northern Hero" (北俠) to replace his master, "Northern Beggar" Hong Qigong. His repertoire of skills is wide-ranging as he has learnt from various masters throughout his life.

During his childhood in Mongolia, Guo Jing picked up wrestling as a sport and had been trained in archery by the legendary archer Jebe. Around the same time, he was introduced to various forms of Chinese martial arts by the "Seven Freaks of Jiangnan". Meanwhile, he also secretly learnt some neigong cultivation techniques from three of the "Seven Immortals of Quanzhen".

Guo Jing's best-known skill is the Eighteen Dragon-Subduing Palms (降龍十八掌), which he learnt from Hong Qigong, one of the "Five Greats". He also picked up two other powerful skills – 72 Styles Vacant Fist (七十二路空明拳) and Technique of Ambidexterity (雙手互搏) – from "Old Imp" Zhou Botong, who becomes sworn brothers with him and later also joins the ranks of the "Five Greats". Zhou Botong also indirectly trained Guo Jing to learn the neigong skills in the Jiuyin Zhenjing.

In his adulthood, Guo Jing is a capable military leader, having studied the Book of Wumu, a military treatise by the Song general Yue Fei. He used the knowledge acquired from the book to lead troops into battle during the Mongol campaign against the Khwarezmid Empire, and later against Mongol forces at the Battle of Xiangyang.

== In adaptations ==
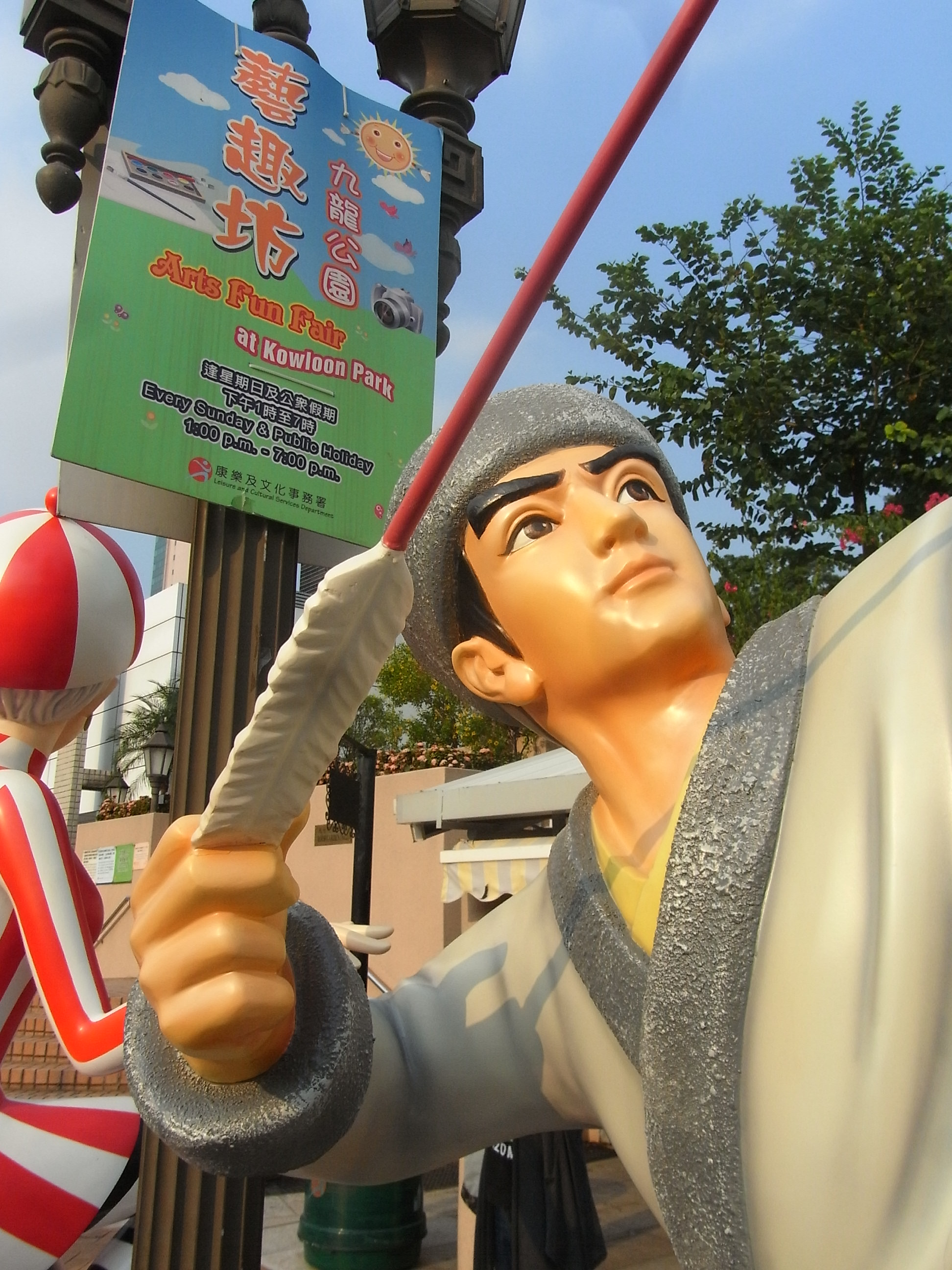
Statue of Guo Jing at the Hong Kong Avenue of Comic Stars, Kowloon Park, Hong Kong.

Notable actors who have portrayed Guo Jing in films and television series include Cho Tat-wah (1958), Alexander Fu (1977–1981), Jason Pai (1976-1995), Philip Kwok (1982), Felix Wong (1983), Bryan Leung (1983), Julian Cheung (1994), Sun Xing (1998), Zhu Houren (1998), Li Yapeng (2003), Wang Luoyong (2006), Hu Ge (2008), Zheng Guolin (2014), Yang Xuwen (2017), Eddy Geng (2021), Ci Sha (2024), Gallen Lo and Xiao Zhan (2025).

Guo Jing is a main character in the 2000 role-playing video game Shachou Eiyuuden: The Eagle Shooting Heroes, released by Sony Computer Entertainment for the PlayStation.

== Family tree ==
Guo Jing and Huang Rong's family tree

Guo Xiaotian
Guo Jing	Guo Polu
Li Ping
Guo Xiang
Huang Yaoshi
Huang Rong	Guo Fu
Feng Heng
Yelü Qi
Yelü Chucai	Yelü Zhu
Yelü Yan
Wu Santong	Wu Dunru
Wu Sanniang	Wu Xiuwen
Wanyan Ping
