= Liu Zi Jue =

Form of Chinese qigong

The Six Healing Sounds or Liù Zì Jué (六字訣) is one of the common forms of Chinese qigong, and involves the coordination of movement and breathing patterns with specific sounds.

== History ==
The term Liù Zì Jué first appears in the book On Caring for the Health of the Mind and Prolonging the Life Span written by Tao Hongjing of the Southern and Northern dynasties (420–589). A leading figure of the Maoshan School of Taoism, Tao was renowned for his profound knowledge of traditional Chinese medicine. "One has only one way for inhalation but six for exhalation" he writes in the book.

Zou Pu'an of the Song dynasty (960–1279) was a major contributor in terms of theory and practice to the transmission of the exercise through his book The Supreme Knack for Health Preservation – Six-Character Approach to Breathing Exercises.

No body movements accompanied the Liù Zì Jué exercises until the Ming dynasty (1386–1644) when Hu Wenhuan and Gao Lian wrote books on the subject. For instance, they both included in their books the summary of Liù Zì Jué for dispelling diseases and prolonging the life span, which combines controlled breathing with physical exercises.

There are a number of schools of exercise which incorporate elements of Liù Zì Jué, including Yi Jin Jing, Ba Gua Zhang and Da Yan Gong, but the sounds are used as an aid to physical exercises in these dynamic Qigong, which is different from Liù Zì Jué. An authoritative work on the subject is Ma Litang's Liù Zì Jué Health and Fitness Exercises for clinical application.

The theoretical basis of the Liù Zì Jué exercises is in line with the ancient theories intrinsic to traditional Chinese medicine of the Five Elements and the Five Solid Viscera. They tend to be on common ground on such issues as mouth forms and pronunciation methods, and the direction of body movements and mind follow the inner circulation law of the meridians.

== The sounds/sections ==
- 噓 xū – 'deep sigh' or 'hiss' – Level the Liver Qi
- 呵 hē – 'yawn' or 'laughing sound' – Supplement the Heart Qi
- 呼 hū – 'to sigh,' 'to exhale,' or 'to call' – Cultivate [or Shore Up] the Spleen/Pancreas Qi
- 嘶 sī – 'to rest' – Supplement the Lung Qi
- 吹 chuī – 'to blow out,' 'to blast,' or 'to puff' – Supplement the Kidney Qi
- 嘻 xī – 'mirthful' – Regulate the Triple Burner Qi

All syllables are pronounced on a level tone – the so-called first tone (regardless of the dictionary pronunciation of each word); typically all but the fifth sound are sustained – the fifth sound may be sustained, or pronounced quickly and forcefully.

== See also ==
- Ba Duan Jin
- Neigong
- Qigong
- Traditional Chinese medicine
- Yangsheng (Daoism)
- Yi Jin Jing
