= Yijin Jing =

Chinese exercise manual

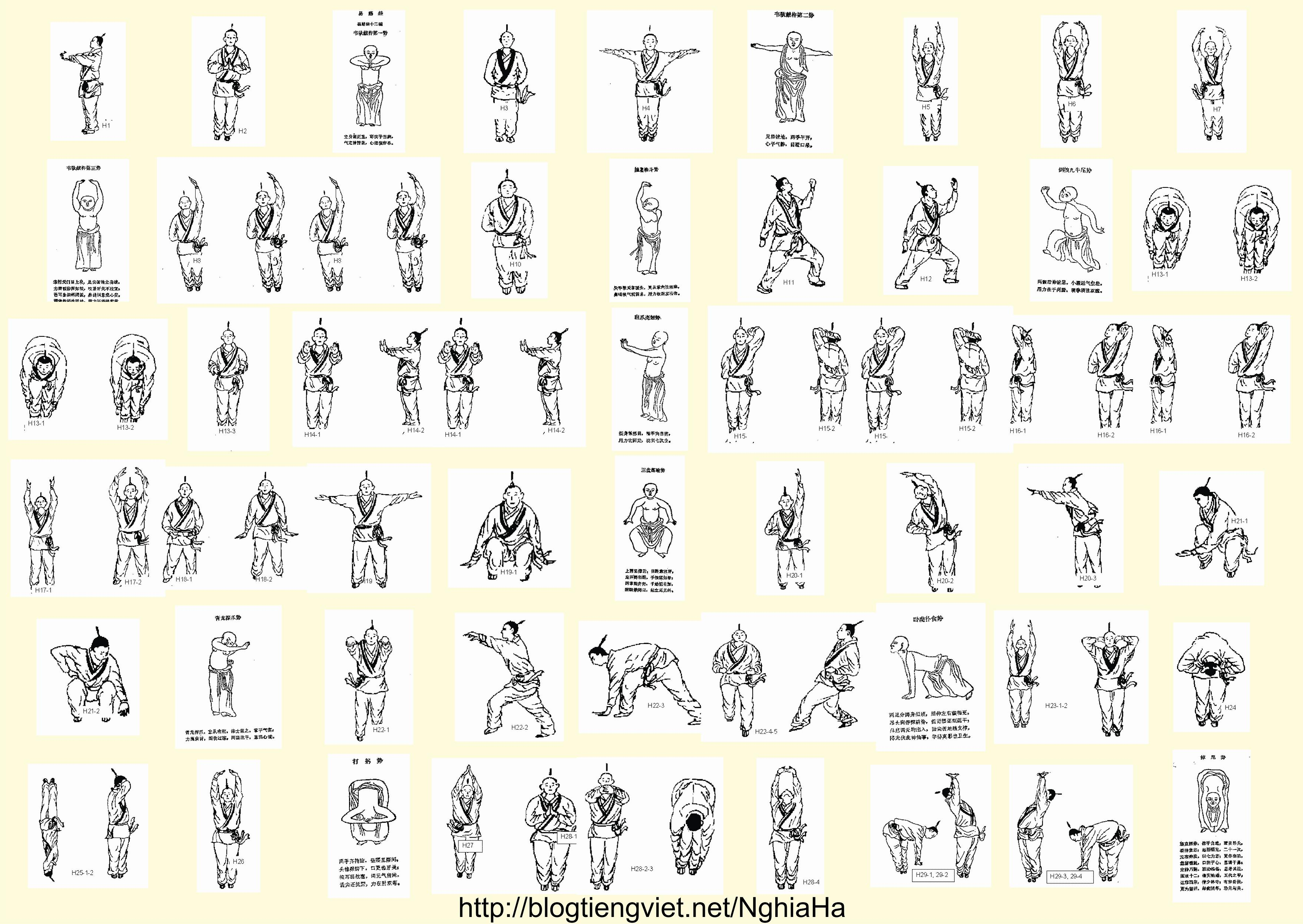
Illustration of exercises from the Yijin Jing

The Yijin Jing (simplified Chinese: 易筋经; traditional Chinese: 易筋經; pinyin: Yìjīn Jīng; Wade–Giles: I Chin Ching; lit. 'Muscle/Tendon Change Classic', 'or "Sinews Transformation's Classic"') or Yik-kan Ging is a manual of daoyin exercises, a series of mental and bodily exercises to cultivate jing (精; essence) and direct and refine qi, the internal energy of the body according to traditional Chinese medicine.

== Etymology ==
In Chinese, yi means "change", jin means "tendons and sinews", while jing translates to "classic".

== Origins ==
=== Legendary origins ===
According to legend, the Yijin Jing was said to be left behind by Bodhidharma (Da Mo) after his departure from the Shaolin Monastery, and discovered within his grave (or hidden in the walls of the temple) years after he left (or died). It was accompanied by another text, the Xisui Jing, which was passed to a student of Bodhidharma's, but has not survived to the present day.

The monks of Shaolin supposedly practiced the exercises within the text but lost the true purpose of the document; Lin Boyuan recounts that they "selfishly coveted it, practicing the skills therein, falling into heterodox ways, and losing the correct purpose of cultivating the Way. The Shaolin monks have made some fame for themselves through their fighting skill; this is all due to having obtained this manuscript."

Both documents were written, per the theory of traditional Chinese medicine, which was not well understood by the monks of the temple. Even to this day modern Chinese medical universities (like Shanghai) classify Yijin Jing as a "mind-body tool of Traditional Chinese Medicine (TCM)" specifically designed to regulate functional homeostasis for health. According to one legend, a monk decided that the text must contain more valuable knowledge than simply self-defense, and went on a pilgrimage with a copy of the text to find someone who could translate its deeper meaning. During his travels, he met a priest named Zhēndì Sānzàng (真諦三藏) in the province of Szechwan inland southern China. Upon examining the text, Zhēndì explained that its meaning was extraordinarily deep and beyond his ability to translate fully. He nonetheless provided a partial translation. The monk found that within a year of practicing the techniques as the priest had translated, his constitution had become "as hard as steel", and he felt he could be a Buddha. The monk was so pleased that he thereafter followed Zhēndì wherever he went.

=== Modern scholarly research ===
The legendary account springs from two prefaces which accompany the Yijin Jing. One of these prefaces purports to be written by general Li Jing in 628 during the Tang dynasty, while the other purports to be written by general Niu Gao, an officer of the Song dynasty General Yue Fei. However, several inaccuracies and inconsistencies in these forewords cast doubt on the authenticity of Bodhidharma's authorship of the Yijin Jing.

It was specifically the foreword by Li Jing by which Tang Hao traced the attribution of Shaolin Kung Fu to Bodhidharma. Li Jing's foreword refers to "the tenth year of the Taihe period of Emperor Xiaoming of Northern Wei." The Taihe reign period did not occur under Emperor Xiaoming but under Emperor Xiaowen and, in its tenth year (487 CE), the Shaolin temple did not yet exist according to the Jiaqing Chongxiu Yitongzhi, itself an updated compilation of earlier records, which states that the Shaolin temple was built in the twentieth year of the Taihe era (497 CE). Li Jing's foreword also claims that he received the manual containing the exercises from the "Bushy Bearded Hero" (虬髯客, Qiuran ke), a popular fictional character from a Tang dynasty story of the same name by Du Guangting (850-933).

Niu Gao's foreword mentions the Qinzhong temple, which wasn't erected until 20 years after the date he claims to be writing. He also claims to be illiterate. Dictation could resolve the question of how an illiterate could write a foreword, but it is almost certain that a general of Niu Gao's stature was not illiterate. Thus during the 18th century, the scholar Ling Tingkan concluded in a sarcastic fashion that the author of the Yijin Jing must have been an "ignorant" and a "master" all at the same time (i.e., Tingkan states that the author must have been an "ignorant village master").

The text of the Yijin Jing was probably composed by the Taoist priest Zining writing in 1624. The earliest surviving edition of the Yijin Jing was dated by Ryuchi Matsuda to 1827. In the course of his research, Matsuda found no mention of—let alone attribution to—Bodhidharma in any of the numerous texts written about the Shaolin martial arts before the 19th century.

== Daoyin exercises ==
The Yijin Jing is a manual of Daoyin exercises, a series of cognitive body and mind unity exercises practiced as a form of Daoist neigong, meditation and mindfulness to cultivate jing (精; essence) and direct and refine qi, the internal energy of the body according to traditional Chinese medicine. The practice of daoyin was a precursor of qigong, and blended with the introduction of Indian yoga into China with the spread of Buddhism and was practised in Chinese Taoist monasteries for health and spiritual cultivation. The Yijin Jing contains a relatively intense set of practices that aim to strengthen muscles and tendons, promote strength and flexibility, control and balance, increase speed and stamina, and improve balance and coordination and flexibility of the body and mind.

=== Purposes ===
The basic purpose of Yijin Jing is to turn flaccid and frail sinews and tendons into strong and sturdy ones. The movements of Yijin Jing are at once vigorous and gentle. Their performance calls for a unity of will and strength, i.e. using one's will to direct the exertion of muscular strength. It is coordinated with breathing. Better muscles and tendons means better health and shape, more resistance, flexibility, and endurance. It is obtained as follows:

- postures influence the static and nervous structure of the body
- stretching muscles and sinews affects organs, joints, meridians and qi
- torsion affects metabolism and Jing production
- breathing produces more and better refined qi
- active working gives back balance and strength to body and mind (brain, nervous system and spirit).

Power and endurance are of paramount importance in becoming qualified in a chosen practice, be it tuina, martial arts, or simply better health and wisdom. A qigong system, Baduanjin, was used in the past from schools of Xingyiquan and Taijiquan as bodily preparation to fighting arts, in order to make body strong and flexible. Baduanjin still remains the first, entry-level routine to learn at Shaolin training schools in Song Mountains.

Japanese kata like sanchin, postures and forms like siu nim tao in Wing Chun, and "iron thread" in Hung Gar are all examples of neigong in Neijia. Yijin Jing is meant to unify yi (intention) with li (strength) and consciousness (yang) with muscular force (yin). In this exercise, the mind is supposed to be free from thoughts, having a correct and well-disposed attitude, and harmonious breathing.. Internal and external movement must be coordinated, and movements must be relaxed.

Some classic recurring points of Yijin Jing can be described as follows:

- Most of the movements use open palms, fists are used only for stretching the tendons.
- The names of exercises change, but often the basic idea of movement remains the same. I.e. Wei Tuo greets and offers something (Nanjing Academy of Tuina); Wei Tuo offers gifts to the sky (Liu Dong); General Skanda holds the Cudgel (Zong Wu-Li Mao).
- Movements are done standing, sometimes bending forward, but never lying or sitting.
- Eyes are always open, never closed.
- Movements are slow but full and tensed, face and body shows relaxed attitude.
- All directions of the upper body section (especially shoulders) are active and moved.
- Dynamic tension rules the moves.
- All parts of the body work together.
- There are different ways of practicing the same Yijin Jing form, according to the basic rules, to the body shape, to the time of practice and to the general health conditions.

According to traditional verbal formulas, we have that:

- The first year of training gives back physical and mental vitality.
- The second year enhances blood circulation and nurtures meridians.
- The third year allows flexibility to muscles and nurtures the organs.
- The fourth year improves meridians and nurtures viscera.
- The fifth year washes the marrow and nurtures the brain.

The five rules of Yijin Jing are:

1. Quietness: Like lake water reflects the moon, a calm spirit allows energy to move inside the body.
2. Slowness: In order to use and flex muscles deeply, to get maximum extension and move qi and xue; (血; blood), slow movements are required.
3. Extension: Each movement must be brought to the maximum.
4. Pause: Efficacy comes through waiting and keeping tension for a longer time.
5. Flexibility: Limbs and trunk must be extended so that blood and energy can circulate, so we have flexibility.

Breathing in Yijin Jing is a controversial point. Many modern sources insist on a deep, forced, reverse breathing in order to develop power and more thoroughly energize the body. Other sources suggest that this may often create excessive strain and pressure on the body. Robert W. Smith, in his article on the J.A.M.A. in 1996, suggests that there are differences between the northern and the southern way of breath. The southern variants seem not to have a developed system of regulating breathing or working on qi. In his work on Breathing in Taiji and other fighting arts, Smith analyses not only Taiji veterans and classics, but also known fighters out of his personal experience, and concludes that the kind of breathing which is most effective, be it for martial or for health purposes, is located between classic abdominal breathing and a slow, unconscious breathing, with scope for explosive exhalations of the kind typically used to accompany strikes in many martial arts styles.

=== Exercises ===
The number of exercises tends to change; some contend that 18 should be the correct one (if based on the 18 Arhats), but can vary from 10 to 24, to 30. Today the most respected routine is that of Wang Zuyuan, composed of 12 exercises, and has been adopted by the Academies of Chinese Medicine in China. Chang Renxia and Chang Weizhen jointly proposed an alternative set of 14 exercises, which can be of interest for the therapeutic effects he promises. Deng Mingdao presents a version with 24 exercises known as Xisui Jing. In fact, another point of contention is the relationship between the Xisui Jing and the Yijin Jing. Some authors tend to use these two names for the same routine; others separate these practices to invoke different results and different effects on the body. Then, there are other authors that have written different books and created different theories, sometimes not simply in search for the truth.

The '12 posture moving exercise' kept to this day is something that Wang Zuyuan learned at the Shaolin Monastery on Mount Song. It is somewhat different from the original 'Picture of stationary exercise' and the 'Guide to the art of attack' (as Guangdong sources demonstrate). Some specialists (Liu Dong) refer to a later integration of Yijin Jing, daoyin, tuina, and Xingyi methods. However Wang's 12 Postures is found through practice to be a concise aid in enhancing one's physical health. As the name implies, "sinew transforming exercise" is the method to train the tendons and muscles. The exercise is designed according to the course and characteristics of qi circulation in the 12 regular channels and the du and ren channels. During practice, qi and blood usually circulates with proper speed and with no sluggishness or stagnation. Because of such efficacy, Yijin Jing has existed for centuries as a favorite with the populace and is still widely used in sanatoria and hospitals for therapeutic purposes. Two ancient written and illustrated routines remain, one from Chen Yi's A Collection of Annals published during the Ming dynasty and another more recent one published in 1882 from Wang Zuyuan's Internal Work Illustrated.

The '12 posture moving exercise' supposedly describes what is called the purported '12 fists of Bodhidharma' in many Southern martial arts, most notably Hung Gar and Wing Chun. Legend states that the 12 exercises were developed based on the movements of the 12 animals that Bodhidharma studied after his 9 years of meditation. These exercises aided the health of the Shaolin Monastery monks, and contributed to many of the animal-based martial arts in China.

== Popular culture ==
The Yijin Jing is featured in Louis Cha's wuxia novel The Smiling, Proud Wanderer. In the story, the Shaolin abbot teaches Linghu Chong (the protagonist) how to use the skills described in the Yijin Jing to heal his internal injuries.

In the manhua Dragon Tiger Gate, Shibumi ('Evil God of the Fiery Cloud'), the supreme ruler of the Lousha Sect in Japan, has mastered this legendary Qi technique. In the graphic novel, Yijin Jing is divided into 7 stages, or 7 "levels of the pagoda". Besides the 1st and 2nd stage without a color, the later stages all have distinctive colors associated with them: the 3rd is red, the 4th is yellow, the 5th is blue, the 6th is white and, finally, the 7th is black. 'The Black Pagoda' therefore is the most powerful and most dangerous of all. One who masters this stage is virtually unbeatable.

== See also ==
- Baduanjin
- Liu Zi Jue
- Qigong
