= Asahi Nordic and Asahi Health =

Finnish health exercise

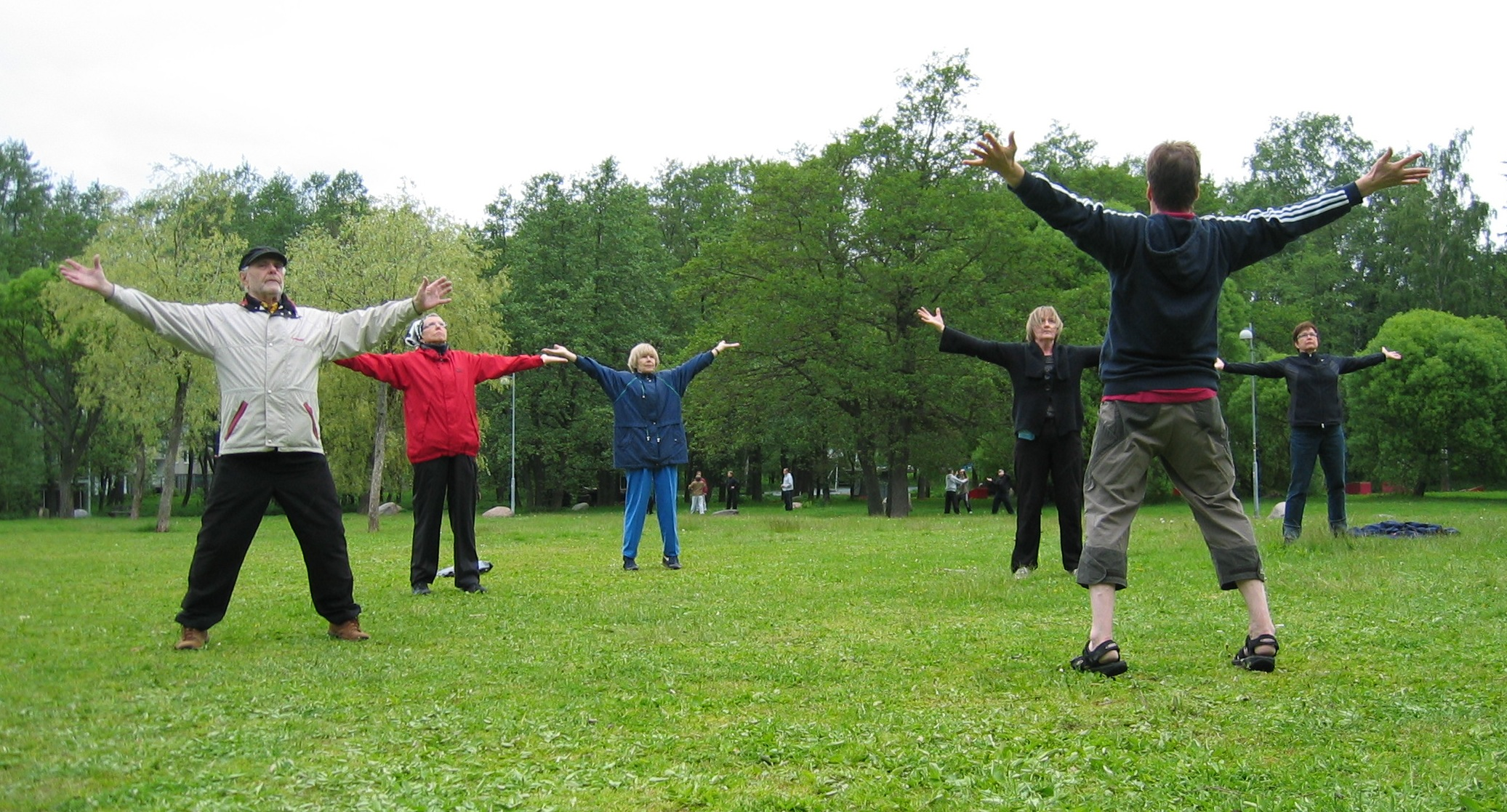
People performing Asahi in a park.

Asahi is a Finnish health exercise based on the eastern traditions of tai chi, qigong, yiquan and yoga, with a western scientific viewpoint. In Finland, there are two Asahi organisations, Asahi Nordic and Asahi Health. The international wing of Asahi Nordic is Asahi World.

Asahi exercise is often taught and performed in groups but can also be performed alone.

== Etymology ==
Asahi is from the Japanese for morning sun (Kanji: 朝日; Hiragana: あさひ; Katakana: アサヒ).

== The History of Asahi ==
Asahi was created in Finland in 2004 by Timo Klemola, Ilpo Jalamo, Keijo Mikkonen, and Dr. Yrjö Mähönen. In 2024, Dr. Mähönen credited Ilpo Jalamo and Keijo Mikkonen with originating the idea, writing that he was pulled into the project due to his professional expertise in internal medicine and geriatrics, and that Timo Klemola, Ph.D. had contributed his expertise in Eastern philosophy.

According to Dr. Mähönen, all of the founders were Black Belt in Karate, and all sought a "simple, effective and inexpensive form of health exercise especially designed for Finnish people."

In 2014, the founding members parted company.

Dr. Yrjö Mähönen and Ilpo Jalamo founded Asahi Nordic ry in 2015. Their new website was fully functional by 2016. They offer training worldwide, as well as throughout Finland. In 2026, their international website listed many dozens of instructors in twelve countries. Asahi training sessions at FinnFest USA have been well-attended.

Keijo Mikkonen continued to offer Asahi training in Helsinki, through the original website Asahi Health. In 2023, he reached the rank of 6.dan in Karate.

== The Principles of Asahi ==
Asahi is a series of slow movements, completed in silence. It looks a bit like qigong.

The original six principles of Asahi were:

1. Coordinating movement and breath (Liikkeen ja hengityksen rytmitys)
2. Practicing vertical body alignment (Kehon pystysuoran linjauksen harjoittaminen)
3. Moving the whole body (Kehonlaajuinen liike)
4. Moving slowly and listening (Liikkeen hitaus ja kuuntelu)
5. Training the mind with imagery (Mielen harjoittaminen mielikuvien avulla)
6. Letting the movements flow (Harjoitus muodostaa virtaavan kokonaisuuden)

In its 2021 English-language publication, Asahi Nordic lists eleven principles:

1. combining movement and breath
2. staying relaxed
3. moving slowly with concentration
4. keeping your body in alignment
5. alternating contracting and expanding the body
6. working through the string of joints
7. focusing on your core
8. practicing balance
9. letting the movements flow
10. moving in spirals
11. being in a state of awareness

The Asahi World webpage describes Asahi® as "... a versatile health exercise suitable for all ages and fitness levels. Originating from Finland, Asahi is known for its holistic approach, incorporating gentle movements synchronized with slow breathing. Whether you're an athlete seeking post-workout recovery or an individual looking for stress relief, Asahi offers a fitness program that caters to everyone."

The Asahi Health website describes Asahi Health™ as (in translation to English) "a method of health exercise developed by Finns, the purpose of which is the prevention and treatment of our typical ailments. It is a method like physiotherapy, in which a person himself treats and takes care of himself by doing simple and natural exercises supported by breathing. Asahi is also a psychophysical form of exercise that allows the body to relax and calm the mind."

== Efficacy ==
There is limited scientific evidence of the efficacy of Asahi on the static and dynamic balance of the elderly, from a 12-week study of 11 individuals over the age of 65 conducted by physical therapy students in a graduate program at JAMK University of Applied Sciences in 2016.

== See also ==
- Qigong
- Yiquan
- Tai chi
- Yoga
