= Sui Yunjiang =

Chinese martial artist

Sui Yunjiang 隋云江
- Born: 18 November 1945 (age 79); China
- Style: Liang Style Baguazhang, Meihuaquan
- Teachers: Li Ziming; Han Qichang; Wang Zhizhong; Zhao Shide

Sui Yunjiang (Chinese: 隋云江) is a famous Chinese martial artist. He was born in Heilongjiang province on 18 November 1945. From an early age he studied martial arts with famous masters including Li Ziming, Han Qichang, Wang Zhizhong, and Zhao Shide. His specialties are Liang Style Baguazhang and Meihuazhuang (also known as Meihuaquan). The famous third generation Baguazhang master Li Ziming and disciple of Liang Zhenpu once wrote words of praise for him: "Yun Jiang is one of my most outstanding apprentices in the fourth Baguazhang generation". After several years of training with Li, he suggested Sui supplement his Baguazhang training with Meihuazhuang and introduced him to his close friend and famous 17th generation Meihuazhuang master Han Qichang. He is now a 4th generation Baguazhang descendant under Li Ziming and 18th generation Meihuazhuang descendant under Han Qichang. For many years now, he has taught many students from both China and overseas including professional athletes and martial arts enthusiasts from the US, Japan, Russia, South Korea, Thailand, Australia, Switzerland, Belgium, Sweden, and Singapore. Master Sui is a member of the Beijing Baguazhang Research Association and the Beijing Meihuazhuang Research Association.

In 1990 he was invited by the Soviet Central Athletics Bureau and Moscow Athletics Bureau to teach martial arts in the Former Soviet Union (Russian Federation). During his four-year stay in the Former Soviet Union, he participated in many martial arts conferences, and on the Soviet Central TV station introduced Chinese traditional culture on a show titled Chinese Traditional Martial Arts. He was invited by Dr. Ma Liangwen, a famous Soviet expert on Chinese studies, to participate in a Russian-organized international academic conference. In this conference, he reported on functions of the human body and modern science and was given favorable comments from many international experts. On the Russian International Radio Broadcasting Station he participated in an exchange of Chinese and Russian traditional cultures.

After he returned to China he participated in the Third International Wushu Exchange Tournament in Dalian, China and was selected as the vice chairman of the event. He also personally competed in the tournament and won a gold medal and his apprentices won silver and bronze medals. In 1997, the chairman of the Sino-Japanese Martial Arts Alliance, Mr. Zuo Teng Jin Bing Wei, hired him as a consultant for the Japanese Baguazhang Research Association. In that same year, the Japanese Baguazhang Research Association and the Japanese Gai Zhi Company came to Beijing in order to make a video series of Sui Yunjiang's Baguazhang for distribution in the Japanese market. There have been many articles about him and photographs published in Japan's Martial King Magazine, as well as periodicals in other nations such as Switzerland.

In recent years, he has been prominently featured in many well-known publications. In 1996, he was published in the China Modern Wushu Masters Dictionary. In 1998 was published in the American Who's Who Around The World, The Essence of China Encyclopedia, The Essence of Chinese Wushu List, and the Chinese Scientist article, "China Expert Resource Century Treasure". In early 1999 he was published in the Chinese Expert Name Dictionary and Chinese Figures of the Century. In the fall of 1999, he went to South Korea to teach martial arts. In July 2005, he traveled to Italy to teach Baguazhang and Meihuazhuang. He is currently instructing students again in Beijing. In September 2007, he traveled to the United States for the first time to give seminars on Baguazhang and Meihuazhang in New York City.
