= Chen Fake =

Chinese martial artist

Chen Fake 陳發科
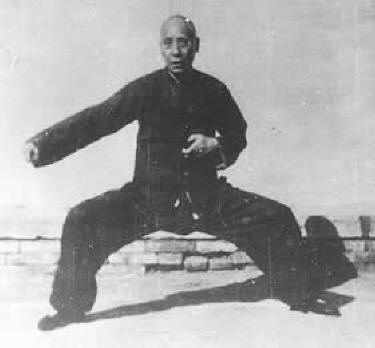
- An older Chen Fake plays the "xin jia" form he introduced to the world
- Born: 1887; Chen Village, Henan, China
- Died: 1957 (aged 69–70)
- Nationality: Chinese
- Style: Wushu: Chen-style tai chi
- Teacher: Chen Yanxi
- Rank: 9th gen. Grandmaster of Chen-style tai chi

Other information
- Notable relatives: Chen Changxing, Chen Youben, Chen Qingping
- Notable students: Tian Xiuchen, Hong Junsheng, Lei Muni, Li Zhongyin, Li Jingwu, Xiao Qingling, Feng Zhiqiang, Chen Zhaokui, Li Jianhua, Tian Jianhua

Chen Fake
- Chinese: 陳發科
Transcriptions
Standard Mandarin
- Hanyu Pinyin: Chén Fākē
- Wade–Giles: Ch'en Fa-k'e

Chen Fake (Chinese: 陳發科; Wade–Giles: Ch'en Fa-k'e; 1887–1957), courtesy name Chen Fusheng (福生), was a Chinese martial artist who taught Chen-style tai chi. He was born and raised in Chen Family Village (Chenjiagou, 陳家溝) in Henan province. In 1928, Chen Fake relocated to Beijing to teach his family's heritage, Chen-style tai chi. After successfully defeating numerous challengers, Chen garnered a following of students, including several renowned martial artists. As a martial artist rather than a scholar, Chen Fake did not leave behind a written record of his accomplishments. His life story was recounted and preserved by his sons and students, most notably Hong Junsheng. By the time of his death in 1957, Chen had firmly established the global practice of Chen-style tai chi, creating a martial arts tradition that continues to thrive.

== Background ==
=== Early life ===
Chen Fake was born in 1887 in Chen Village, located in Wen county, Henan. This village had a longstanding reputation for martial arts expertise dating back to its establishment in 1374.

Chen's great grandfather was Chen Changxing, who taught Yang Luchan, the founder of Yang-style tai chi. Chen Fake's father, Chen Yanxi (陈延熙; 1820 ? – ), worked as an armed escort, which necessitated his mastery of martial arts as he traveled across the country protecting convoys.

Chen Fake was born when his father was in his sixties, and both of his older brothers had already died. Consequently, he lived a relatively privileged life. During his youth, Chen frequently fell ill and was occasionally confined to bed. Due to his health issues, he did not engage in the practice of his family's martial art.

However, everything changed when Chen's father went to Shandong province around 1900 to teach martial arts to the family of Yuan Shikai, when Chen Fake was fourteen. Since this assignment required Chen Yanxi to be away for an extended period, he entrusted the care of his family to relatives. One evening, Chen Fake overheard his relatives criticizing his weakness and suggesting that he had failed to live up to the expectations of his ancestors. (Note: "延熙这一支，辈辈出高手，可惜到发科这一辈就完了，他都十四岁了，还这么虚弱，不能下工夫，这不眼看完了吗？") This greatly disturbed Chen. He yearned to prove his relatives wrong but feared it might be too late. In comparison to others within Chen village, he considered himself lacking in martial arts ability. This question haunted him until he realized that by dedicating himself to the practice of his family's art, he could enhance his skills. Over the next three years, while others rested or relaxed after their daily chores, Chen diligently practiced the various forms of Chen's family tai chi. Whenever he had questions, he sought help from everyone around him. His unwavering determination made him one of the most accomplished practitioners in Chen village. When his father returned for a visit, he was pleased with Fake's achievements.

=== Adulthood ===
For two generations, the Yang family of Yang Luchan and the Wu family of Wu Quanyou spread the fame of the martial art of tai chi throughout the Qing Empire. The Qing government ended by a revolution and similar disruption were happening throughout Chinese society. It was during these turbulent times that Chen Zhaopei (陈照丕; 1893–1972) went to Beijing to teach Chen's style tai chi in 1928. Chen Zhaopei's instructions attracted considerable interest and in 1930 he was invited to teach in Nanjing. Zhaopei did not want to leave his Beijing students so he suggested that they invite his uncle Chen Fake to take his place. At this time Chen Fake moved from a small village in Henan Province to the thriving metropolis of Beijing.

Before the arrival of Chen Fake, the public perception of tai chi was based on the views of the Yang style and Wu style. This meant that the tai chi forms were practiced as slow and relaxed movements. Chen Fake showed a different type of training that at times can include fast vigorous actions and explosive moves. So in the beginning, many within the Beijing martial arts community doubt the authenticity of Chen Fake's tai chi. According to Chinese tradition, when Chen first arrived in the Chinese capital, he was openly challenged by other martial artists in order to establish his credibility. In those impromptu competitions, there were no rules and no preparations so they could be quite dangerous. For the next thirty years, Chen remained undefeated. Chen not only established an unparalleled martial arts reputation but earned the public's respect for his morality and integrity.

According to his student, Hong Junsheng, Chen Fake never criticized other martial artists either publicly or privately. Chen would also admonish his students for criticizing others. Chen was quoted as saying: “The pillar of socialization is loyalty and the method of dealing with people should be based on modesty and cooperation. Loyalty fosters trust; modesty encourages progress; and cooperation befriends people. Modesty and cooperation should be based on loyalty not on hypocrisy.”

== Students ==
Chen Fake's impact on the martial art of Chen-style tai chi extended beyond Chen Village, where he established a tradition of his own. During his teaching career in Beijing, he trained numerous students, including many well-known martial artists. By the time of Chen's death in 1957, his students had gained recognition as skilled Chen-style practitioners and went on to train the next generation of Chen tai chi practitioners.

Among Chen Fake's notable students were his two sons and his daughter:

- Chen Zhaoxu (陈照旭, 1912 – 1959) was Chen Fake's second son. His older brother, Chen Zhaoguan (陈照冠), died at a young age. Zhaoxu began training with his father at a young age and later assisted him by leading some training sessions. Upon his father's request, he returned to Chen Village to teach. Zhaoxu endured hardships during the turbulent times of the Cultural Revolution and, as a result, died at a relatively young age. His boxing legacy lives on through his two sons. The second son, Chen Xiaowang, currently resides in Australia and is recognized as one of the leading proponents of Chen-style tai chi. The third son, Chen Xiaoxing (陈小星 b. 1952), now serves as the head instructor at Chen Village's tai chi school (陈家沟太极拳学校校长). Chen Xiaoxing's son, Chen Ziqiang (陳自強), is also teaching in Chen Village.
- Chen Yuxia (陈豫侠, 1924–1986) was Chen Fake's only daughter. She began training with her father at the age of eight and achieved a high level of proficiency in Chen-style tai chi. In the 1980s, when students of Hong Junsheng inquired about the Chen Sword Form, Hong identified Yuxia as the expert who still possessed a deep understanding of the intricacies of the form. As a result, all of Hong's students practiced the form taught by Yuxia. Until her death she was regarded as a well-known authority on Chen-style tai chi.
- Chen Zhaokui (陈照奎, 1928 – 1981) was Chen Fake's third son. He trained many of the current practitioners of Chen-style tai chi throughout China. His son, Chen Yu (陈俞, 1962 – ), is actively teaching Chen-style worldwide.

Another notable individual related to Chen Fake was his nephew:

- Chen Zhaopi (陈照丕, 1893一1972), courtesy name Chen Jifu (绩甫), was a close relative of Chen Fake. Zhaopi was born into a respected martial arts family, with his father, Chen Dengke (陈登科), also being an accomplished martial artist. Zhaopi extensively trained with Chen Fake in Chen Village during his youth, while his father was away on business. At the age of 21, he traveled to Gansu and Hebei to teach martial arts. In 1928, he was invited to teach in Beijing, and by 1930, he received invitations from the mayor of Nanjing and the Nanjing government. Not wanting to leave his Beijing students, he suggested that they invite Chen Fake to teach them instead. Zhaopi continued to teach across China despite the chaos of war. In 1958, at the age of sixty-five, he retired and returned to teach in Chen Village. Zhaopi faced considerable hardship during the turmoils of the Cultural Revolution, enduring persecution and a ban on teaching what was considered a bourgeois and decadent art. Nevertheless, Zhaopi succeeded in preserving the legacy of Chen Family tai chi. He authored four books: Cases of Chen-Style Tai Chi (陈氏太极拳汇宗), Beginner's Guide to Tai Chi (太极拳入门), Illustrated Guide to Chen-Style Tai Chi (陈氏太极拳图解) and Thirteen Theories of Chen-Style Tai Chi (陈氏太极拳理论十三篇). His students include the four leading proponents of Chen-style tai chi from Chen Village: Chen Zhenglei (陈正雷), Chen Xiaowang (陈小旺), Zhu Tiancai (朱天才) and Wang Xi'an (王西安).

Some of Chen Fake's students were:

- Shen Jiazhen (沈家桢, 1891–1972) was an engineer by profession. He was one of the first students of Chen Fake and studied with him for a decade. Shen Jiazhen co-authored a book titled Chen-Style Tai Chi (陈氏太极拳) with fellow Chen stylist Gu Liuxin (顾留馨). He tirelessly promoted the art but, like many other traditional martial artists, he faced persecution and hardships during the Cultural Revolution.
- Tang Hao (1897–1959) was one of the pioneering martial arts historians. After meeting Chen Fake, he visited Chen Village to research the origins of Chen-style tai chi. His interest in the martial art continued throughout his life.
- Yang Yichen (杨益臣. 1904–1959), courtesy name Defu (德福), was of Manchu descent. His family was part of the Yellow Banners in the Qing court. Yichen grew up in a martial arts family. Yichen and his five brothers were already proficient in the martial arts at a young age. Yang Yichen initially trained in Wu style with Liu Musan (刘慕三) before switching to Chen style under Chen Fake. He diligently trained with Fake until the civil unrest of 1937 forced him to relocate his family to Xi'an for safety. In Xian, Yang Yichen continued to teach according to Fake's principles. Hong Junsheng considered him to have learned the essence of Chen Fake's teachings. Despite his early death, Yang Yichen left behind numerous students who carry on the Chen tradition.
- Zhang Xuan, (张瑄, 1905–1984) came from a martial arts family associated with the Qing court. He trained in xingyiquan, baguazhang, and tam tui with Zhang Jianquan (张剑泉). He was working at the Beijing telegraph when Chen Fake started to teach his Chen style. Zhang trained with Chen for three years before he relocated to Xi'an due to the Chinese civil war. He continued to teach martial arts with his friend and fellow student of Chen Fake, Yang Yichen (杨益臣). Zhang dedicated the rest of his life to spreading the art of Chen-style tai chi.
- Pan Yongzhou (潘詠周: 1906–1996, alias Zuomin) was a student at Beijing University. He initially studied Yang-style and later Wu-style tai chi with Liu Musan. Like his classmate Hong Junsheng, Pan switched to studying Chen style when Chen Fake arrived in Beijing. He studied with Fake until circumstances forced him to emigrate to Taiwan. In Taiwan, together with Wang Helin (王鶴林), Wang Mengbi (王夢弼, alias Muzhao) and Guo Qingshan (郭青山, alias Yangzhi), he established a strong Chen-style tradition. Pan wrote a book titled "Chen Tai Chi Encyclopedia" summarizing his understanding of the art.
- Hong Junsheng (1907–1996) was one of Chen Fake's longest-serving students. He began training with Fake in 1930 and continued uninterrupted until 1945 when he moved to Jinan, Shandong province. Despite facing tremendous hardships, Hong dedicated himself to teaching the traditional martial arts system of his teacher. Towards the end of his life, Hong summarized his experience and understanding in the book, Chen Tai Chi Practical Method (Chinese: 陈式太极拳实用拳法; pinyin: Chén shì tàijí quán shíyòng quánfǎ). Portions of this book were translated into English by Hong's student Joseph Chen Zhonghua in 2006. Hong emphasized the martial aspects of the art, referring to it as the "Practical Method" (实用拳法) to emphasize the martial aspects of the art which he felt was the key function of the tai chi of his teacher.
- Gu Liuxin (顧留馨; 1908–1991) was born in Shanghai and began training in martial arts at the age of eleven. He graduated from Shanghai University (上海文治大学) with a business degree in 1927 and was an active member of the Chinese Communist Party during the Chinese Communist Revolution. Throughout his life, he maintained his interest in martial arts and sought to learn from leading martial artists of his time, including Chen Fake. He co-authored the book Chen-Style Tai Chi (陈氏太极拳) with Jiazhen Shen (沈家桢. 1891 – 1972). He also wrote a book on "Cannon fist".
- Lei Muni (雷慕尼; 1911–1986) was born in Wuchang District, Hubei, and was well-versed in martial arts before becoming a student of Chen Fake in 1932. In 1961, he began teaching tai chi in Beijing. Over his lifetime, he authored numerous books on martial arts, including "Chen-Style Tai Chi 45 Moves" (陈式太极拳45式) and "Chen-Style Tai Chi 33 Moves" (陈氏太极拳三十三式).
- Zhong Minggao (钟鸣高, 1911–1998), courtesy name Tiansheng (天声), enrolled in the Whampoa Military Academy and served in the military and various political offices. He trained with Chen Fake during his time in Beijing.
- Li Jingwu (李经悟; 1912–1997) was born in Ye County, Shandong and began training in martial arts in 1927. In 1941, he studied Wu-style tai chi (吴式) with Yang Yuting (杨禹廷) and Chen Style with Chen Fake in Beijing. After the founding of the People's Republic, he actively promoted tai chi. Li Jingwu participated in the 1956 Beijing Wushu Competition, winning first place in tai chi. He was part of the committee of the National Sports Commission that created the Standard Simplified Tai Chi in 1958. Later, he taught Qigong at a nursing home in Beidaihe District and continued to research and promote martial arts.
- Chen Yunting (陈云亭, 1912 – ) was born and raised in Chen Village. Along with his brother Chen Guiting (陳桂亭), he studied extensively with Chen Fake. In 1930, he began teaching tai chi in various regions of China, including Xuzhou. Chen Yunting trained many Chen-style practitioners throughout his life.
- Wang Helin (王鶴林; 1915–?) started his martial arts training at the age of seventeen. He emigrated to Taiwan during the Chinese Civil War and continued to teach Chen-style for the rest of his life. Wang He-Lin, along with his fellow student Pan Yongzhou, was considered one of the six elders of Chen-style tai chi in Taiwan.
- Tian Xiuchen (田秀臣; 1917–1984) initially studied Shaolin Boxing in his youth and later studied xingyiquan with master Tangfeng Ting (唐凤亭). He switched to studying Chen-style tai chi after meeting Chen Fake in 1941. After meeting Chen Fake in 1941, he switched to studying Chen-style tai chi. Tian Xiuchen received permission from Chen Fake to teach Chen-style tai chi with his master's variations. His nephews Tian Qiumao (田秋茂, b.1945 – ), Tian Qiuxin and Tian Qiutian, who also trained with Feng Zhiqiang, continues to teach Chen style in Beijing.
- Feng Zhiqiang (冯志强; 1928–2012) was already proficient in xinyiquan under the tutelage of Hu Yaozhen (1879–1973) before he started to train with Chen Fake in 1953. After Fake's death, Feng became one of the leading proponents of Chen-style tai chi first within China and internationally. He developed a new training program called Hunyuantaiji (混元太极) which summarized his lifelong understanding of martial arts. The Hunyuantaiji system is now practiced worldwide.
- Xiao Qinglin (肖庆林, 1929–2010) born in Yexian (掖县), Shandong. He studied with Chen Fake and dedicated his life to actively promoting Chen-style tai chi in the Beijing area.
- Li Zhongyin (李忠荫, died 2000), born in Beijing, was an indoor student of Chen Fake and also a master of xinyi liuhequan under the famous Wang Jiwu (王继武). He was the first secretary of Chen Fake's Beijing Chen Taijiquan Association.
- Tian Jianhua (田剑华), born in Beijing, younger brother of Tian Xiuchen, is the younger brother of Tian Xiuchen and the youngest indoor disciple of Chen Fake. At 90 years old, he is the only living disciple of Chen Fake and currently serves as the honorary advisor to the Beijing Chen Taijiquan Association.

== What is a form? ==
Forms, known as taolu (Chinese: 套路; pinyin: tàolù), are the foundational elements of Chinese martial arts systems. Within Chen style tai chi, the renowned master Chen Fake conveyed his knowledge through two primary bare fist forms: the First Form (Yilu, 一路) and the Second Form (Erlu, Chinese: 二路), also known as the "Cannon Fist" (Chinese: 炮锤). Additionally, he imparted forms dedicated to sword and broadsword techniques.

Following Chen Fake's death, his students developed variations and distinct interpretations of these forms. One such variation is the Old Frame (老架), representing the forms he initially taught upon arriving in Beijing. Another variation is the New Frame (Xin Jia, 新架). which he promoted later in his career. Each subsequent instructor after Chen Fake may present and teach the forms with slight differences, leading to debates regarding their authenticity. This proliferation of styles has sparked discussions within the tai chi community, exploring the merits of different tai chi styles and the distinction between Internal and External martial arts.

Chen Fake did not leave any written material indicating his views on the matter of form. Hong Jungshen observed that Chen Fake changed his teaching method over his thirty-year career. Hong also noticed that his fellow students such as Chen Zhaoxu, Chen Zhaokui and Feng Zhiqiang all practiced their forms differently from him. During Hong's final meeting with Chen Fake in 1957, he raised this issue with his teacher. Chen told Hong to disregard the external appearance of the form and instead focus on the idea that any correct tai chi form should be based on the same fundamental principles, with each element serving a purpose. According to Chen, the external appearance is not important as long as these two requirements are met. In Chen Fake's words: “This set of tai chi does not have one technique which is useless. Everything was carefully designed for a purpose.” (Note: “这套拳没有一个 动作是空的, 都是有用的”) Hong believed that this principle could be derived from “The Tai Chi Treatise” (太极拳论) by Wang Zongyue (王宗岳). This idea is expressed by the phrase: "Although there are myriad variations, there is only one underlying principles" (“虽变化万端, 而理为一贯”).

== Enduring legacy ==
Chen Fake was part of a generation of traditional Chinese martial artists who continued teaching into the early twentieth century. Circumstances led him to teach in the capital of China, where he established a group of students who contributed to the continuation of his method. Despite disruptions during the Cultural Revolution and the later international dissemination of his art, his students and subsequent generations maintained the core elements of his instruction. Their efforts supported the development of Chen-style tai chi communities in various parts of the world.

== Tai chi lineage tree with Chen-style focus ==
The lineage tree serves as a simplified representation of the student-master relationships in tai chi. However, the actual story is considerably more complex, as some students studied under multiple teachers. The most crucial point conveyed by the lineage tree is the pivotal role of Chen Fake and his significant contribution to the dissemination of Chen tai chi beyond Chen village. One minor error in the tree concerns the linkage between Chen Zhaopi. Chen Zhaopi did not train under Chen Fake's father, Chen Yanxi but rather under Zhaopi's own father, Chen Dengke, who belonged to the same generation as Chen Fake. Chen Dengke's father is Chen Yannian (陈延年) who was the brother of Chen Fake's father, Chen Yanxi. It is worth mentioning that the father of both Yannian and Yanxi was Chen Gengyun (陈耕耘). As depicted in the tree, Gengyun shared the same generation as other tai chi practitioners, including Yang Luchan and Chen Qingping. Both Luchan and Gengyun were students of Chen Changxing.
