= Li Ziming =

Li Ziming 李子鳴
- Born: June 25, 1902; Lijia Village, Ji County in Hebei, China
- Died: January 23, 1993 (aged 90)
- Style: Liang Style Baguazhang, Xingyiquan
- Teachers: Liang Zhenpu (梁振蒲); Zhang Zhankui; Shang Yunxiang (尚云祥); Ju Qingyuan

Other information
- Notable students: Sui Yunjiang

Li Ziming (李子鳴) (June 25, 1902 – January 23, 1993) was a martial arts expert and third generation descendant of the creator of Baguazhang, Dong Haichuan, under the lineage of Liang Zhenpu - progenitor of Liang Style Baguazhang.

== Life and work ==
Li Ziming was born in Lijia Village, Ji County in Hebei province on June 25, 1902, and died on January 23, 1993, at the age of 90. He had a very cultured upbringing including the study of literature and martial arts, and was very talented at calligraphy and painting.

In 1921, he became a disciple of the second generation Baguazhang master, Liang Zhenpu, and a friend of his father. He began an intensive study of Baguazhang. Liang passed down the art of Baguazhang through the oral tradition. He practised every day until he achieved a very deep understanding of the fighting secrets of Baguazhang.

After extensive training with Liang, Li entered the Hebei province Martial Arts Academy and trained in martial arts under the famous masters Zhang Zhankui, Shang Yunxiang and Ju Qingyuan.

He later returned to Beijing, where he often exchanged techniques and sparred with martial arts brothers Guo Gumin, Li Shaoan and Zeng Xingsan, as well as many other famous martial arts masters. Li reached a very high level of technical proficiency and attainment in all aspects of Baguazhang including forms, weapons, theory and fighting methods. He was especially skilled at the art of fighting and his hand-to-hand combat skills increased perceptibly over the years.

Li dedicated his life to the preservation of Baguazhang forms, the research of Baguazhang theory and the popularization of the art.

In 1979, in order to protect Dong Haichuan's tomb, he suggested to move it to Wanan Public Cemetery from the old location; on August 2 and 3, 1980, a group of over 100 Beijing Baguazhang practitioners under his leadership moved Dong's remains as well as accompanying stone tablets to the new location in Wanan Public Cemetery.

Li Ziming was conscientious and meticulous with all things relating to Baguazhang. He was not given to flattery, and followed a strong code of morals and righteousness. He was well known for being generous, kind, modest, amiable, charitable, and benevolent to others. He was very patient when teaching his students, while never holding anything back from them. Li Ziming conducted extensive research about the applications of other styles of Baguazhang, and took the best elements from each style. He inherited the complete Baguazhang system and fostered the development of many famous martial artists and masters.

In 1981, he helped establish the first single-style research association in China - The Beijing Baguazhang Research Association - and he was elected its first president; he held this title until his death in 1993. He also established a Baguazhang coaching station.

He received many honors of distinction from both national and international martial arts associations. After his death, he was the second person to be buried next to Dong Haichuan after Liang Zhenpu in Wanan Public Cemetery.

Li Ziming's more famous disciples include Ma Chuanxu (馬傅旭) (second president of the Beijing Baguazhang Research Association), Wang Shitong (王世通), Zhang Huasen (張華森), Zhao Dayuan (赵大元), Di Guoyang (邸国勇) (former president of the Beijing Xingyiquan Research Association), Sui Yunjiang (隋云江), Li Gongcheng, Wang Tong (王桐) (also former president of the Beijing Xingyiquan Research Association), Ling Chengyong, Zhang Quanliang (张全亮) (who has released several VCDs and DVDs), Sun Hunyan and Ma Ling.
