= Paidagong =

Discipline of Chinese martial arts

Pāidagōng (also, pāida-qìgōng 拍打氣功) is one of the disciplines of Chinese martial arts, in which the mind and body parts are concentrated and strengthened, generating a high tolerance for pain and abuse. Also called a power effect, or martial arts' power effect.

== See also ==
- Qigong
