= Chifeng sui =

Chinese medical compendium by Zhou Lüjing

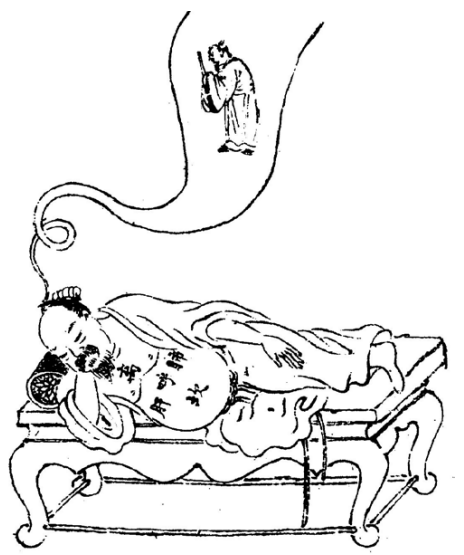
Illustration of a Daoist engaged in "sleep practice" in the Chifeng sui.

The Chifeng sui (Chinese: 赤鳳髓; pinyin: Chìfèng suǐ), known in English as the Marrow of the Red Phoenix, is a Chinese medical compendium composed during the Ming dynasty by Zhou Lüjing (周履靖). Born to an upper-class family, Zhou was groomed for politics; after being diagnosed with tuberculosis, however, he embarked on a quest for self-healing and eventually became a Daoist ascetic. Dated to 1578, the Chifeng sui contains numerous "longevity methods" collected by Zhou over the years.

== Contents ==
Drawing upon sources on qigong from the Song and Yuan dynasties, the Chifeng sui is concerned with "longevity methods" including breathing techniques, gymnastics, and sleep exercises. The manual also includes twelve "incubation practices of stillness" attributed to the "master of cosmic energy" Chen Tuan.

== Authorship and publication history ==
Although Zhou Lüjing (周履靖) was an educated and married aristocrat, he was also prone to sickness. After contracting tuberculosis, Zhou left his family in search of ways to improve his health. Over the years, Zhou became well-versed in Daoism and had amassed a vast collection of Daoist spells and medicine. Zhou, who was also known as "Meidian daoren" (梅颠道人) or the "Daoist Confounded by Plum Blossoms", subsequently composed the Chifeng sui, which is dated to 1578 and first appears in his anthology of medical writings titled Yimen guangdu (夷門廣牘) or Wide Tablets of the Gate of Silence.

A complete French translation by Catherine Despeux, titled La moelle du phénix rouge, was published in 1988, whereas a partial English translation by Teri Takehiro was published in 1990.
