= Chen Zhonghua =

Chinese martial arts practitioner, teacher and author

陈中华 Chen Zhonghua
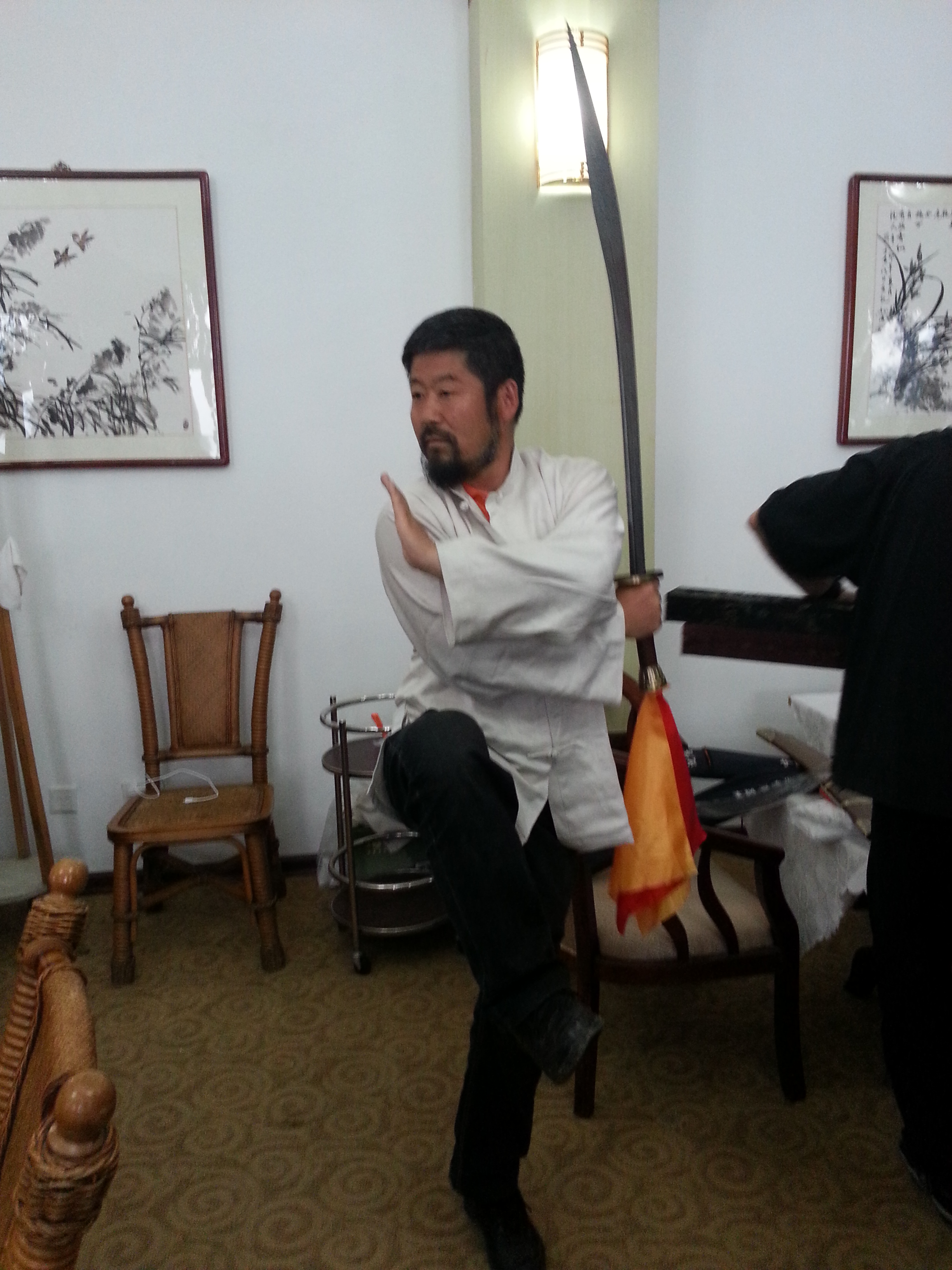
- Born: 1961 (age 63–64); Shandong, China
- Nationality: Chinese
- Style: Chen-style tai chi
- Teachers: Han Boyan, Hong Junsheng, Feng Zhiqiang
- Years active: 1985-present

Other information
- University: Shandong University, University of Regina
- Website: http://www.practicalmethod.com

Joseph Chen Zhonghua (Chinese: 陈中华; pinyin: Chén Zhōnghuá), also known by his courtesy name Dongliang is a Chinese martial arts practitioner, teacher, and author from Shandong, China. Chen studied under two experts of the eighteenth generation of Chen-style tai chi, Hong Junsheng and Feng Zhiqiang (冯志强, 1928–2012). In 1985, Chen and his family emigrated to Canada, where he began to promote Hong's version of Chen-style tai chi to a western audience. In 2005, Chen was designated by Hong family as the International Standard-Bearer of Hong's Practical Method, during a ceremony held in Jinan. Since 2006, he has overseen a residential tai chi training program on Daqingshan in Shandong.

== Early life and training with Hong Junsheng ==
Chen was born in 1961 in Wulian County, Shandong province, China. Due to his frailty since childhood, he embarked on studying martial arts at the age of 9 to enhance his health. Chen sought training from several local martial arts masters and delved into various traditional styles, including Tongbeiquan, Bajiquan and Chaquan.

In 1979, Chen was admitted to the Department of Foreign Languages, Shandong University in Jinan. While pursuing his studies, he continued his martial arts training under the guidance of Han Boyan (韩伯言, 1907 – 1996), who himself had trained with the renowned Xingyiquan master Shang Yunxiang. It was during his time in Jinan that Chen heard rumors about a group of martial artists practicing near Black Tiger Spring. Intrigued, he made several visits and discovered that they were training in Chen-style tai chi under the instruction of Hong Junsheng.

Hong Junsheng was one of the longest-serving disciple of Chen Fake. Chen Fake himself was a well-known martial artist and the first to teach Chen-style tai chi to the general public. Hong was a traditional martial artist and did not actively promote or advertise his group. Initially skeptical about the effectiveness of Chen-style tai chi, Chen became convinced of its value after training and collaborating with the group. Following a period of intensive training, he became Hong's disciple, dedicating himself solely to Chen-style tai chi as taught by Hong, also known as the "Practical Method" (陳式太極拳实用拳法).

== In Canada ==
In 1985, Chen made the decision to emigrate to Regina, Saskatchewan, in order to pursue his master's degree in linguistics at the University of Regina. While studying, he began teaching tai chi part-time at the university. After completing his degree, Chen became a Social Studies teacher within the Canadian secondary school system in Edmonton, Alberta where he continued to teach tai chi on a part-time basis. During this period, Chen combined his exposure to the Western interpretation of taijiquan with his training under Hong Junsheng to develop his own martial arts ideas.

Chen eventually decided to dedicate himself to teaching martial arts full-time. He established his first school in Edmonton. To ensure his own continued training and to foster connections with his teacher and fellow tai chi practitioners, he regularly returned to China with his new students.

== Disciple of Feng Zhiqiang ==
In 1996, Hong Junsheng died. Following this loss, Chen's fellow tai chi practitioners introduced him to another prominent figure in the Chen Style, Feng Zhiqiang (冯志强, 1928–2012). Feng had the distinction of being one of the last students of Chen Fake, with whom he trained from 1950 to 1957. Through his interactions with Feng, Chen was exposed to a different interpretation of Chen tai chi, enriching his understanding of the art. Eventually, Chen became a disciple of Feng and continued to study under his guidance until Feng's death in 2012. During this period, Chen learned various aspects, including the sword form, the long staff form, Zhan zhuang methods, and Feng's unique elaboration on Chen Fake's teachings, which Feng referred to as Chen-style xinyi hunyuan tai chi (陈式心意混元太极拳).

In 2002, Chen authored "The Way of Hunyuan", an introductory text for this training system.

During Hong Junsheng's lifetime, he did not officially appoint an "inheritor" or "standard bearer" for the Practical Method. However, in 2002, the Hong Family and some of Hong's senior students made the decision to appoint Li Enjiu (李恩久) as the official representative for the Practical Method. Three years later, in 2005, it was collectively agreed upon within the group that Joseph Chen would serve as the ‘International Standard Bearer’ responsible for all activities related to the Practical Method outside of China. This election was officially confirmed and authorized by Hong Junsheng's sons, Hong Youren and Hong Youyi, in the presence of Li Enjiu, during the First Annual International Symposium of Chen-style tai chi Practical Method System held at the Shun Gen Shan Zhuang International Conference center in Jinan (济南市).

== Daqingshan ==
Joseph Chen Zhonghua has dedicated himself to the promotion of the traditional martial art of Chen-style tai chi. Since his decision to become a devoted tai chi teacher, he has authored several influential books. These include: "Way of Hunyuan (2002); "Chen Style Taijiquan Practical Method: Theory. Volume one" (2006), which is a partial translation of Hong's seminal work, Chen Style Taijiquan Practical Method (陈式太极拳实用拳法; Chén Shì Tàijíquán Shíyòng Fǎ) and Rules for Chen Style Taijiquan (规矩:嫡传陈氏太极拳法秘要; 2015) co-authored with Sun Zhonghua (孙中华).

In addition to his written contributions, Chen has produced a comprehensive series of instructional DVDs that introduce the fundamental principles of the Practical Method in Chen-style tai chi. As a result of his dedication, Chen has attracted students and disciples from around the world. He regularly travels across the globe to lead workshops and seminars on the Practical Method. It all began with his first Tai Chi Studio in Edmonton, where his disciples actively train according to the principles of the Practical Method throughout Canada.

Chen's influence has extended beyond Canadian borders. He has conducted teaching engagements in various locations across the United States, such as New York Arizona, Iowa and New Hampshire. Moreover, his ideas and teachings have reached Europe, where he has delivered seminars and workshops in Austria, England, Germany, Ireland, Italy Netherlands, and Prague, Czechoslovakia.

Chen's impact has also been felt in regions like Australia, Brazil, China, India, Indonesia, Puerto Rico, Hong Kong and Singapore, where he has disciples dedicated to the Practical Method.

In 2006, Joseph Chen established a school in Daqingshan (大青山; 'Big Green Mountain'), a mountain vacation resort in Shandong, China. This school serves as a training hub where tai chi enthusiasts from China and around the world can engage in full-time instruction with Chen and other disciples of Hong, delving into all aspects of the Practical Method. Located approximately six hours away by car, this school stands in proximity to Chen Village, the historic birthplace of Chen Style Taijiquan and the revered home of Chen Fake.

In 2013, Chen hosted the inaugural International Taijiquan Festival on Daqingshan. The event drew several thousand visitors and competitors, including participants from Chen Village. The success of the festival led to subsequent editions, with the Fifth International Taijiquan Festival on Daqingshan (大青山第五届国际太极拳大赛) in 2017 attracting representatives from over 32 countries and regions, consisting of 130 teams and 1,172 participants. Notably, the event featured over 70 international contestants, establishing it as one of the larger International Tai chi tournaments.
