= Baduanjin qigong =

Form of Chinese qigong used as exercise

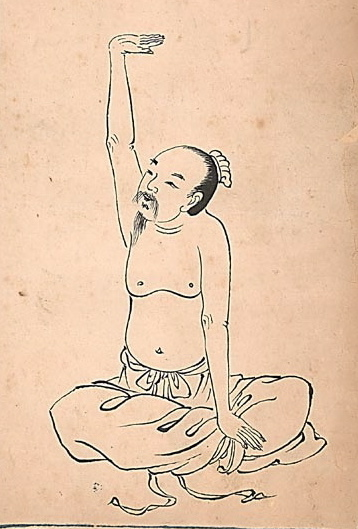
- A Qing-dynasty manual of qigong, illustrating the seated form of Separate Heaven and Earth
- Traditional Chinese: 八段錦氣功
- Simplified Chinese: 八段锦气功
Transcriptions
Standard Mandarin
- Hanyu Pinyin: Bāduànjǐn

The Baduanjin qigong (八段錦) is one of the most common forms of Chinese qigong used as exercise. Variously translated as Eight Pieces of Brocade, Eight-Section Brocade, Eight Silken Movements or Eight Silk Weaving, the form's name refers to how its eight movements characterize and impart a silken quality, like that of brocade, to the body and its energy. In contrast to religious and martial forms of qigong, the Baduanjin is primarily designated as a form of medical qigong, meant to improve health. However, this categorization does not preclude the form's use by martial artists as a supplementary exercise, which is frequent.

== History ==
This exercise is mentioned in several encyclopedias originating from the Song dynasty. The Pivot of the Way (Dao Shi, c. 1150) describes an archaic form of this qigong. The Ten Compilations on Cultivating Perfection (Xiuzhen shi-shu, c. 1300) features illustrations of all eight movements. The same work assigns the creation of this exercise to two of the Eight Immortals, namely Zhongli Quan and Lü Dongbin.

The exercise was later expanded from eight to twelve movements over the centuries and was described in the boxing manual Illustrated Exposition of Internal Techniques (1882) by Wang Zuyuan, a famed practitioner of the Sinew Changing Classic set.

Nineteenth century sources attribute the style to semi-legendary Chinese folk hero General Yue Fei, and describe it as being created as a form of exercise for his soldiers. The legend states he taught the exercise to his men to help keep their bodies strong and well-prepared for battle. Martial historian Prof. Meir Shahar notes Yue's mention as a lineage master in the second preface of the Sinew Changing Classic manual (1624) is the reason why he was attributed as the creator of Baduanjin qigong.

== The sections ==
The Baduanjin as a whole is broken down into eight separate exercises based on the eight extra meridians each focusing on the free flow of qi for the unification of mind and body for physical and emotional stability and health. The Baduanjin traditionally contains both a standing and seated set of eight postures each. In the modern era, the standing version is by far the most widely practiced. The particular order in which the eight pieces are executed sometimes varies, with the following order being the most common.

=== Standing ===
Two Hands Hold up the Heavens (Shuang Shou Tuo Tian)
This move is said to stimulate the "Triple Burner" aka "Triple Warmer" or "Triple Heater" meridian (Sanjiao). It consists of an upward movement of the hands, which are loosely joined and travel up the center of the body.

Drawing the Bow to Shoot the Eagle / Hawk / Vulture
While in a lower horse stance, the practitioner imitates the action of drawing a bow to either side. It is said to exercise the waist area, focusing on the kidneys and spleen.

Separate Heaven and Earth
This resembles a version of the first piece with the hands pressing in opposite directions, one up and one down. A smooth motion in which the hands switch positions is the main action, and it is said to especially stimulate the stomach.

Wise Owl Gazes Backwards or Look Back
This is a stretch of the neck to the left and the right in an alternating fashion.

Sway the Head and Shake the Tail
This is said to regulate the function of the heart and lungs. Its primary aim is to remove excess heat (or fire) (xin huo) from the heart. Xin huo is also associated with heart fire in traditional Chinese medicine. In performing this piece, the practitioner squats in a low horse stance, places the hands on thighs with the elbows facing out and twists to glance backwards on each side.

Two Hands Hold the Feet to Strengthen the Kidneys and Waist
This involves a stretch upwards followed by a forward bend and a holding of the toes.

Clench the Fists and Glare Fiercely (or Angrily)
This resembles the second piece, and is largely a punching movement either to the sides or forward while in horse stance. This, which is the most external of the pieces, is aimed at increasing general vitality and muscular strength.

Bouncing on the Toes
This is a push upward from the toes with a small rocking motion on landing. The gentle shaking vibrations of this piece is said to "smooth out" the qi after practice of the preceding seven pieces or, in some systems, this is more specifically to follow Sway the Head and Shake the Tail, strengthening the feet.

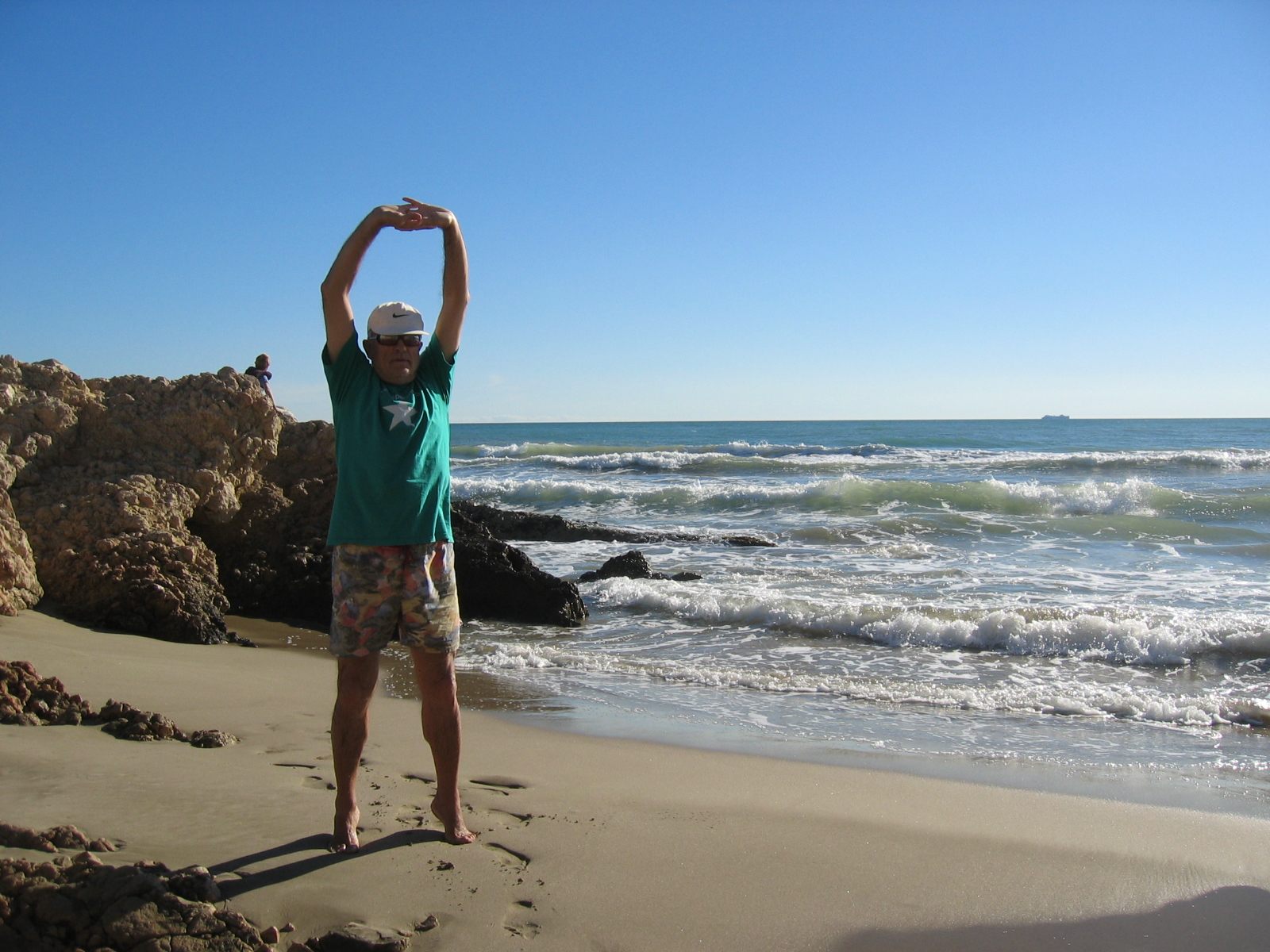
Two Hands Hold up the Heavens

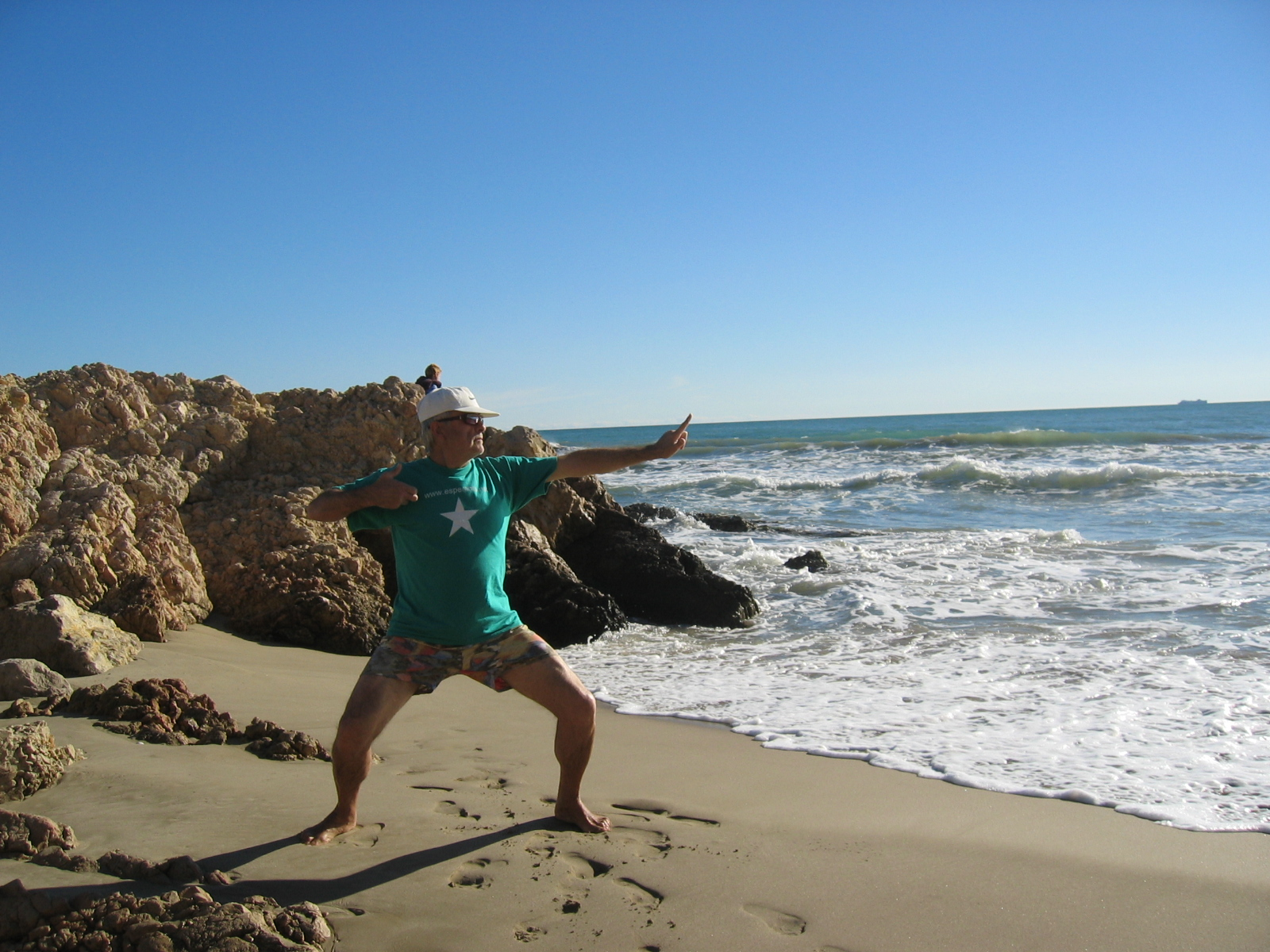
Drawing the Bow to Shoot the Hawk

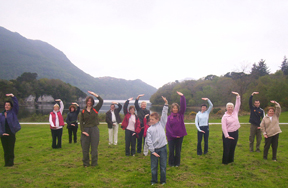
Separate Heaven and Earth

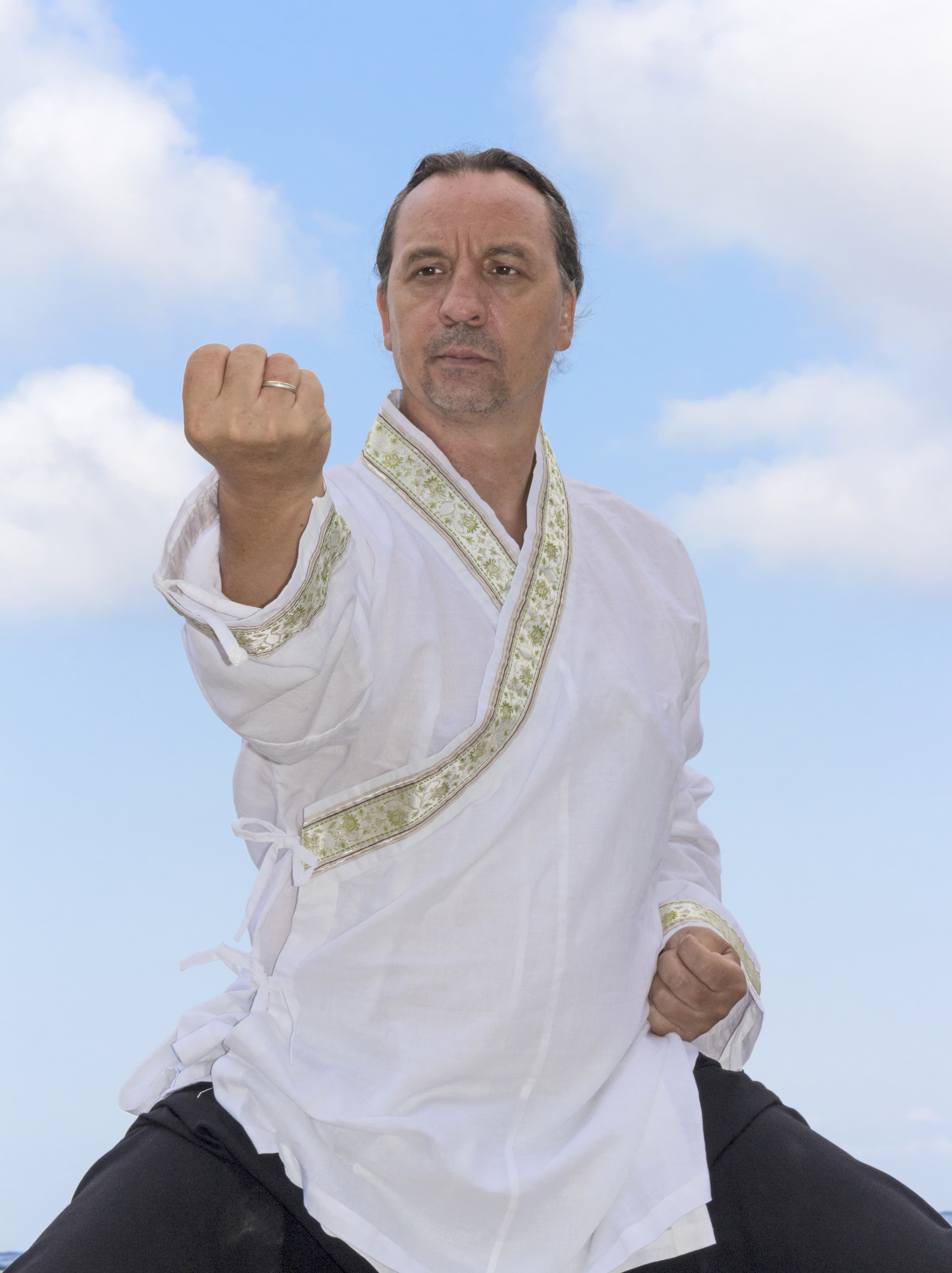
Clench Fists and Glare Fiercely

== See also ==
- Traditional Chinese medicine
- Yijin Jing
- Liu Zi Jue
- Qigong
- Neigong
