= Hong Junsheng =

Hong Junsheng 洪均生
- Born: 1907; Henan, China
- Died: 1996 (aged 88–89); Jinan, Shandong
- Nationality: Chinese
- Style: Tai chi, Chen-style tai chi, Practical Method
- Teachers: Liu Musan, Chen Fake
- Years active: 1956-1996.

Other information
- Occupation: Martial Arts Teacher, Author
- Notable students: Li Chugong, Li Enjiu, Chen Zhonghua, Liu Chengde

Hong Junsheng (Chinese: 洪均生), born in 1907 in Henan, China, was a Chinese martial arts practitioner, teacher and author. Hong was the longest serving disciple for the Chen-style tai chi master Chen Fake. Starting in 1930, Hong trained uninterrupted with Chen for fifteen years. In 1944, Hong moved to the city of Jinan in Shandong Province. In 1956, he returned to Beijing to study again with his teacher, Chen Fake. Later, Hong expressed his understanding of Chen Fake's teachings of tai chi through his own teachings and writings. These theories and training principles are now known as the Chen-style tai chi Practical Method.

Throughout the turmoil of the Cultural Revolution, Hong maintained his dedication to the enrichment of his art. During the Era of Restructuring, Hong trained a new generation of Chen stylists and wrote several articles to illuminate the mysteries of Chen-style tai chi. As China opened up to the international community, Hong was rediscovered as an important link to this ancient Chinese martial arts tradition. Tai chi enthusiasts from all over the world came to train with this remarkable man. Fame and fortune did not change Hong; he remained steadfast to the ideals of the Tao. Even in his old age and ill health, he maintained his daily tai chi training schedule and looked forward to doing pushing hands with his students. In 1996, during his 90th year according to the Chinese calendar, Hong died. He is survived by his family, dedicated disciples, and the lasting legacy of his Practical Method.

== Early life and training with Chen Fake ==
Hong Junsheng was born in 1907, Yuxian County (now Yuzhou) in Henan Province. His grandfather was a government official in the Qing court. At an early age, Hong's family moved to Beijing, where they enjoyed affluence, providing Hong with a leisurely lifestyle and a classical Chinese education. However, Hong was physically weak and often sick during his youth. By the time he turned seventeen, his illness prevented him from continuing his education. Even after getting married at the age of 20, Hong still felt weak and decided to improve his health through physical activity. He began by walking around the Beijing neighborhoods and park.

In 1930, Hong embarked on learning Wu-style tai chi from Liu Musan (刘慕三) to further enhance his well-being. Liu, originally from Wuxi in Jiangsu Province, was the director of the Telegram Service Department at Beijing Telegram Bureau and a respected protégé of Wu Jianquan. It was a time of change within the tai chi world, coinciding with Hong's training with Liu.

Before 1930, tai chi was mainly associated with the Yang family and the Wu family, but the arrival of Chen Fake and his promotion of Chen-style tai chi reshaped this perception. Chen Fake had moved from Chen Village in Wen county, Henan, to Beijing to openly teach his family style, accepting and winning all challenges in accordance with Chinese martial arts tradition. Chen's remarkable feats and accomplishments were widely reported in the press. Liu decided to investigate the validity of these claims and invited Chen for a demonstration of the form and friendly push hand competition. Impressed by Chen's abilities, Liu, along with his students, including Hong, chose to study Chen-style tai chi. For the following fifteen years, Hong dedicated himself to diligent study under the careful guidance of Chen Fake.

Initially, Chen Fake lived with Hong due to Hong's affluence. Among the students, Hong was always the last to receive personal instruction, which allowed him to closely observe Chen's teachings and engage in occasional discussions about tai chi throughout the day. Over time, Hong's health improved, providing him with further motivation to continue his tai chi training. Despite his increasing family responsibilities with six sons and declining fortune, Hong remained committed to training closely with Chen. As Hong's wealth diminished, Chen's reputation soared, and Chen extended an invitation for Hong's family to stay with him. This arrangement allowed Hong to receive additional detailed instructions from Chen. Out of the hundreds of students Chen Fake taught in Beijing over a thirty-year period, only a handful were considered disciples (入门弟子), and Hong was one of the earliest and most dedicated among them, studying closely with Chen for an extended duration.

In 1944, Hong's financial situation deteriorated, leading him to move from Beijing to Jinan, Shandong Province, where he would spend the rest of his life researching and practicing Chen-style tai chi in accordance with Chen Fake's teachings. During this time, he would have one more opportunity to meet his master.

In 1956, Hong was able to visit Beijing once again to train with Chen Fake. In Jinan, Hong had diligently practiced and delved into the meaning of Chen-style tai chi, accumulating numerous questions. Now, with his teacher, it was a time for review and clarification. After thoroughly reviewing every move, application, and counter in the Yilu and Erlu, Hong raised a fundamental question regarding the discrepancy between the skills (gōng, 功) taught by Chen Fake and the movements in the form (fǎ, 法) did not match exactly. He inquired whether he could modify his form to align the gōng (功) and fǎ (法) as demonstrated in the form Chen had taught him. Over the following months, Chen and Hong worked together daily, meticulously examining each move in the Yilu. When they had completed the entire Yilu, Chen Fake proclaimed, "This set of tai chi does not have one technique which is useless. Everything was carefully designed for a purpose" ("这套拳没有一个 动作是空的, 都是有用的”). They made some basic modifications to the Erlu, but Hong was summoned back to Jinan for a wedding, cutting their visit short. It was an intensive six months of refining Hong's interpretation and understanding of Chen-style. At the end, Chen Fake informed Hong that his skills had reached a satisfactory level and that he should now teach tai chi (陈发科: “你的功夫已经达到了我所期望的水平，回去后，你可以教拳了。”) Hong heeded his teacher's advice. Hong followed his teacher's guidance, and upon his return to Jinan, he earnestly began teaching Chen-style tai chi. Just a year later, in 1957, Chen Fake died, making Hong one of the last remaining links to the traditional Chinese martial arts as practiced in the previous century.

== Preparing for the Dao under harsh conditions (1957-1975) ==
Hong's fate was deeply impacted by the social turmoil that engulfed him. Stripped of his wealth, unemployed, and burdened with the responsibility of supporting a large family, Hong tenaciously persisted in his study of tai chi. The tragic era of the Cultural Revolution (1966-1976) further intensified Hong's hardships. Persecuted for his bourgeois background, he endured hunger, malnutrition, and constant struggles to provide for his family.

Nevertheless, despite these challenging circumstances, Hong continued to teach his tai chi. Gradually, he assembled a dedicated group of core students who joined him in experimenting and testing his understanding of Chen Style. During his scarce moments of respite, he would diligently document his thoughts on this ancient art. His unwavering commitment to the practice enabled him to persevere through these difficult times.

== Recognition of the Practical Method (1976-1996) ==
Hong's circumstances underwent a significant improvement during Era of Reconstruction. The Chinese government and society embraced their cultural heritage once again, fostering a renewed interest in tai chi. Martial arts masters were able to openly teach their arts, and the government sponsored demonstrations and exhibitions to reintroduce Chinese martial arts to the public. While Hong generally shied away from the public spotlight, on rare occasions when he made a public appearance, the audience was treated to the authentic Chen-style tai chi passed down from Chen Fake. Despite his personal humility, Hong took great pride in the achievements of his students. When the government sponsored push hand competitions, the team trained by his student Li Enjiu (李恩久) astonished the country with their remarkable performance. They secured numerous gold medals in provincial and national tournaments, all thanks to Hong's teachings.

As the memories of the Cultural Revolution faded, China reestablished relations with other countries, including Japan. Japanese tourists showed a keen interest in China's authentic martial arts heritage and explored various regions, including Chen Village and Jinan. Japanese martial arts associations encountered Hong during their visits near Black Tiger Spring (黑虎泉), where he trained regularly. Impressed by his skills, they engaged in spontaneous tests of his student's abilities. These organizations began organizing regular tours to train with Hong and established tai chi clubs in Japan based on his teachings. They affectionately bestowed upon him the nickname "Tai Chi Super Star" (太极巨星) and "Tai Chi’s Magic Hand" (太极魔手) Eventually, taiji enthusiasts from around the world traveled to train with Hong. Recognizing his increasing popularity and the demand from foreign visitors, the Chinese government improved his living conditions.

In 1988, after twenty-one years of diligent work, Hong compiled his extensive notes into a comprehensive book titled Chen-Style Tai Chi Practical Method (陈式太极拳实用拳法, Chén shì tàijíquán shíyòng quánfǎ) Within this book, Hong meticulously described each technique within the Chen-style tai chi curriculum and aimed to correct prevalent misinterpretations in tai chi practice. Leveraging his expertise in traditional Chinese poetry, he captured the essence of Chen-style tai chi through two poems known as the "Three-Character Canons" (三字经) and "The Quality of Tai Chi" (太極拳品). In 2006, portions of this book were translated into English by Hong's disciple, Chen Zhonghua.

In 1990, Hong suffered a stroke that left him paralyzed from the waist down. However, through sheer willpower, he persisted in practicing his tai chi, despite being unable to walk freely. Hong attributed this ability to his daily taiji practice. He continued to train with his students each day until his death in 1996.

== An enduring legacy for Chen-style tai chi ==
Hong's legacy lies in his extensive research and profound understanding of Chen-style tai chi as taught by Chen Fake. This legacy is evident in his disciples, who are highly esteemed practitioners of tai chi, teaching Hong's Practical Method. Among the many disciples are

- Li Zongqing (李宗慶; 1922 - 1993), initially trained in bajiquan. He started his training with Hong in 1966. He began training with Hong in 1966 and became his teaching assistant, representing Hong in various events, including those in Japan.
- He Shugan (何淑淦; b.1933), one of Hong's earliest students. He commenced his training with Hong in the winter of 1950. His students established the Heze Hung Junshen Chen-style tai chi Research Association (菏泽市陈式太极洪均生拳法研究会) in 2011.
- Han Baoli (韩保礼; b.1936), trained with Hong starting from 1960 and served as one of Hong's assistants in the later years of his life.
- Li Chugong (李储功; b.1936), one of the main instructors actively teaching the Practical Method in Jinan, Shandong, China. He became Hong Junsheng's student in 1966 and maintained a close relationship with him for nearly 30 years. Li has authored several articles and produced video instructional materials on the Practical Method. In 2007, he published a book titled "实用太极拳对练" (The Practical Method Taijiquan Paired Training).
- Ha Lezhi (哈乐之; b.1940), an accomplished martial artist who dedicated his life to teaching and researching the Practical Method. He has taught tai chi at various universities in Shandong Province.
- Jiang Jiajun (蒋家骏; b.1942), the honorary president of the Xuzhou Chen Style Taijiquan Research Association (徐州市陈式太极拳研究会) and the chief referee for the "“WMA • 武林大会联盟”", martial arts competition program on China Central Television program (CCTV).
- Wang Jinxuan (王金轩; b.1942), currently teaching the Practical Method in China.
- Li Enjiu (李恩久; b.1950), recognized by the Hong family as the Standard Bearer for Hong's Practical Method. He teaches at his own "Shandong Taiji Shangwu Club" (山东尚武太极拳) in Jinan, China.
- Zhang Lianen (张联恩; b.1952), the head of the "Jinan Chen Style Taijiquan Association".
- Peter Wu Shizeng (吴仕增; b.1952), teaching in Australia.
- Joseph Chen Zhonghua (recognized by the Hong family as the International Standard Bearer for Hong's Practical Method. He is based in Canada and Daqingshan (in Shandong, China).

Hong's deep understanding of Chen-style tai chi can be summarized in the first verse of his poem, "Three-Character Canons" (三字经):

陈(Chén)太极(tàijí)，理(lǐ)法(fǎ)精(jīng)，阴阳(yīnyáng)理(lǐ)，互(hù)变(biàn)中(zhōng)。

which translates as:

In Chen-style tai chi, The theory is precise, Yin and yang is the principle, Both part of an interplay.

This revelation is manifested in the practice of the Practical Method of Chen Style Tai Chi Chuan, following Hong Junsheng's instructions.

== Tai chi lineage tree with Chen-style focus ==
Hong Junsheng can be regarded as the 10th generation practitioner of Chen Style tai chi, as depicted in the Chen-style lineage tree. According to Hong, only direct descendants of the Chen family can consider themselves practitioners of Chen-style tai chi. All other practitioners of Chen tai chi are considered Chen stylists as long as they adhere to the unique principles of Chen style. Some tai chi practitioners may refer to Hong's method as Hong-style tai chi, but Hong himself objected to such naming conventions. He consistently emphasized that he was merely a student of Chen Fake and taught according to his teacher's instructions. Hong used the term "Practical Method" to highlight the martial aspects of his research and training.
