= Tang Hao =

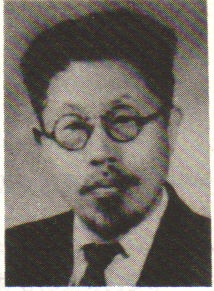
Tang Hao around 1929

Tang Hao (Chinese: 唐豪; pinyin: Táng Háo) or Tang Fan Sheng (1887–1959) was a Chinese lawyer and expert on chinese martial arts.

== Biography ==
Tang studied many Chinese and Japanese martial arts, including tai chi (with Chen Fake), xingyiquan, judo and kendo.

Tang was arrested in 1927, during or just after the Shanghai massacre of 1927, under suspicion of links to the Communist Party, but was later acquitted and released. He then went to Japan to study law and martial arts. Tang was impressed by Japan's ongoing modernization, and wrote several articles advocating reform and modernization of the Chinese martial arts, with an emphasis on practical martial skills that could be used to strengthen the nation. After returning to China, Tang was hired as an editor by the Central Guoshu Institute, a martial arts academy which had been established by the Nationalist government under a similar philosophy to his own.

In 1932, Tang travelled to the Chen family village to study Chen-style tai chi, the oldest and original tai chi style. Tang intended to clarify the origins of the art by studying the historical documents and records of the Chen family.

After the Japanese invasion of Manchuria in 1931, Tang began participating in anti-Japanese activities. He advocated training in military saber and bayonet fighting techniques, and developed his own training equipment to do so. While living in occupied Shanghai in 1941, Tang went into hiding to avoid arrest by the Japanese-controlled puppet government. After returning to his home, Tang blamed his wife for having allowed his collection of martial arts books to be damaged by rats while he was in hiding, and she subsequently hanged herself. Tang was then arrested and tortured for his political activities, but there was no proof of any crime and he was released.

In 1955, after the Communists won the Chinese Civil War, Tang began working for the Commission of Sports to study the history of Chinese sports. Having spent much of his money on collecting historical materials, Tang spent much of his life in and out of poverty. After completing The Preliminary Study of the Historical Materials for Ancient Chinese Ball Games, Tang fell ill and died in Beijing on January 20, 1959.

Tang Hao is widely considered to be the first serious historian of the Chinese martial arts, and his works continue to be cited by contemporary scholars today. Tang published a dozen books and many articles on the history of Chinese martial arts. Much of his work focused on debunking the mythology and folklore of Chinese martial arts, in particular the false lineages purporting to link traditional martial arts to various ancient mythological or historical figures. Tang's Study of Shaolin and Wudang (Shaolin Wudang kao) attacked the myths, still popular today, that attributed Shaolin martial arts to the Buddhist monk Bodhidharma, and tai chii to the legendary Taoist sage Zhang Sanfeng.

== See also ==
- Matsuda Ryuchi
