= Shang Yunxiang =

尚云祥 Shang Yunxiang
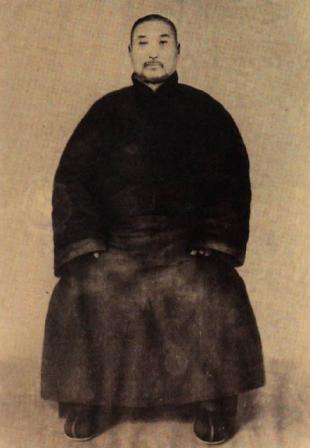
- Born: 1864; Leiling, Shandong, China
- Died: 1937 (aged 72–73)
- Nationality: Chinese
- Style: Xingyiquan

Other information
- Notable students: Li Hong, Zhang Shijie

Shang Yunxiang (尚云祥), a.k.a. Shang Jiting (尚霁亭), was a renowned master of Xingyiquan in the late Qing Dynasty (1644–1911) and early Minguo (Republic of China, 1911–1949). He was born in Leling City of Shandong Province, in 1864. He died at the age of 73 in 1937.

Shang was an inspector with the military of five cities and became the head of house security for the Qing Court Eunuch and Area Military Commander-in-Chief Li. He was known for his small limbs and big belly. His belly was said to have shown legendary strength—many boxers supposedly broke their wrists by punching him in the stomach.

== Biography ==
Shang obtained his Xingyiquan skills from Li Cunyi (李存义, 1847–1927). In the beginning, Li Cunyi refused to accept Shang as a student due to his “not-ideal-physique for martial arts”. Shang was skinny and short, of a height of less than 1.6 meters. It was under the intercede of Zhou Mingtai (周明泰, a student of Liu Qilan) that Li Cunyi accepted Shang Yunxiang as his student. When he was older, Shang also learned Baguazhang from both Li Cunyi and Cheng Tinghua (程庭华, 1848–1900). Shang was well known for his skill with the Beng Quan (one of the five basic skills of Xing Yi Quan). Because he was skilled in combat, Guo Yunshen (郭云深, 1820–1901) visited him personally to instruct him on his Beng Quan methods (for which he had also been known).

Shang, like his shifu Li Cunyi, was famous with his combat ability, he earned nicknames like “Iron Arms”, “Iron Feet Buddha”, “Half Step Bengquan”, etc. for his real-life combat experiences and his ability to generate exceptionally strong explosive power. Shang's career had always been related to martial arts. He had worked as a biaotou (headman of a biaoju which is an establishment which provides services such as escorts, bodyguards, transport of goods (armed) for a fee), bodyguard, detective, martial and arts teacher.

The style Shang taught was promoted as 'Shang Style Xingyiquan' by his successors. The leading figures of Shang Style Xingyiquan were/are Li Wenbin (李文彬, 1918–1997, Shang's student), Shang Zhirong (尚芝容, 1923–2004, Shang's youngest daughter), Li Hong (李宏, born 1954), Zhang Shijie (张世杰, born 1946), etc. Shang's oldest living student was Han Boyan (韩伯言, 1907–1996), who at an old age became the first Internal Arts teacher of tai chi master Chen Zhonghua. Shang style is still practiced by many people today, in China and abroad. It is thought to be the most popular Xingyi style in the Beijing area in modern times.

Shang's lineage can be traced along the Xingyiquan lineage chart:

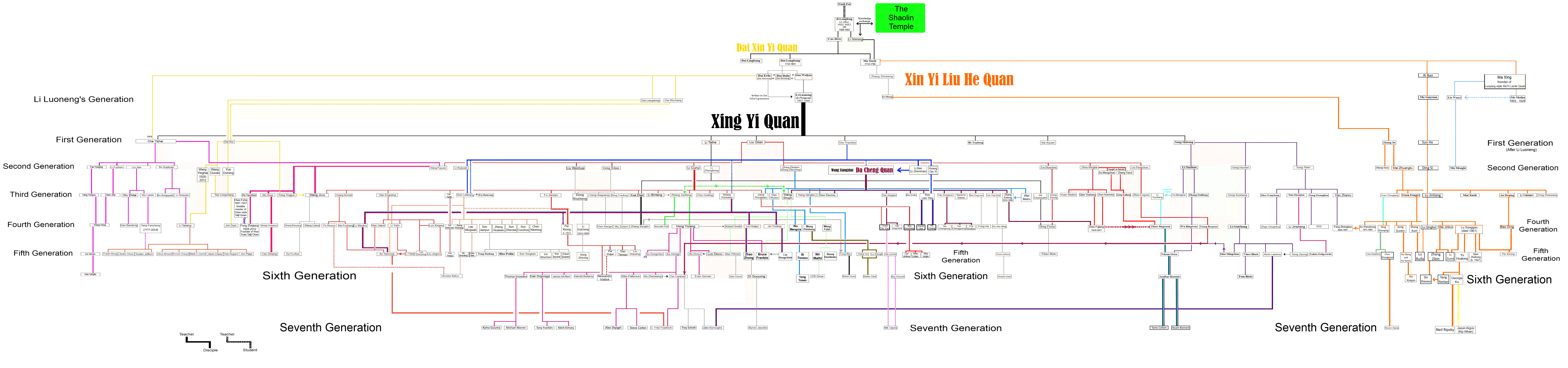
The Various lineages of Xing Yi Quan
