= Liang-style baguazhang =

Liang Style Baguazhang
- Hardness: Internal (neijia)
- Country of origin: China
- Creator: Liang Zhenpu
- Famous practitioners: Guo Gumin, Li Ziming, Vince Black
- Parenthood: Baguazhang
- Olympic sport: No

Liang Style Baguazhang is the style of Baguazhang descended from Liang Zhenpu, the youngest disciple of Baguazhang's founder, Dong Haichuan. In general, most lineages of Liang style descend from either Guo Gumin or Li Ziming:

- Dong Haichuan
  - Liang Zhenpu
    - An Guoliang
    - Chen Delu
    - Da Mingliang
    - Dong Wenxiu
    - Fu Zhenlun
    - Gao Qisheng
    - Gao Qinfeng
    - Gao Qingyung
    - Geng Ziyu
    - Guo Gumin
      - Gao Ziying
        - Gao Jiwu
        - Yang Bao
        - Shao Jinzhang
      - Gao Ziwu
    - Hu Zibin
    - Jia Yian
    - Li Ziming
      - Ma Chuanxu (eldest disciple)
      - Vince Black
      - Di Guoyong
        - Byron Jacobs
      - Li Gong Cheng
        - Ong Ming Thong
      - Ling Changyong
        - Shi Xingbao
      - Ma Ling
      - Sui Yunjian
      - Sun Hunyan
      - Wang Tong
        - Geoff Sweeting
      - Wang Shitong
        - Tom Bisio
      - Yang Jiacang
      - Zhang Huasen
      - Zhang Quanliang
      - Zhao Dayuan
      - Zhuoteng Jinbinwei
    - Li Jinhua
    - Li Jingbao
    - Li Mengrui
    - Li Tongtai
    - Li Wancai
    - Liu Huating
    - Liu Baoding
    - Liu Hegui
    - Lu Ermazi
    - Ma Laopang
    - Qin Laodu
    - Su Sanpang
    - Tian Zhenfeng
    - Wang Chaoren
    - Wang Chenzhai
    - Wang Fengxiu
    - Xia Songling
    - Zhang Donghai
    - Zhao Shikui

In general, Liang style appears somewhat similar to both Yin and Cheng styles; most Liang style practitioners are concentrated in Beijing.

As its technical basis, Liang style Baguazhang has the "Eight Mother Palms" (Ding Shi Ba Zhang) and the "Eight Changing Palms" (Ba Da Zhang aka Lao Ba Zhang), from which more complicated linking forms are derived like the "Dragon Form" (Long Xing Zhang), "64 Linear Palms" (Liushisi Shou Zhang), "Linking Palms" (Lian Huan Zhang) and "Eight Directions Palms" (Ba Mian Zhang). Liang style is also known for its large array of weapons: Big Broadsword, Straight Sword, Spear, Rooster Knives, Chicken Claw Knives, Mandarin Duck Knives, Crescent Moon Knives (aka Deer Horn Knives), Kun Lun Fan, Yin Yang Pen Brush, Steel "Yo-Yo" Meteors, Seven Star Rod, Wind and Fire Rings.
