= JAMK University of Applied Sciences =

Institute of higher education in Central Finland

Coordinates: 62°15′00″N 25°44′31″E

Jamk University of Applied Sciences
- Jyväskylän ammattikorkeakoulu
- Motto in English: Re-Inventing Higher Education
- Type: University of applied sciences (polytechnic)
- Established: 1994
- Rector: Vesa Saarikoski
- Students: 9,500 (2023)
- Location: Jyväskylä and Saarijärvi, Central Finland, Finland
- Campus: Multiple sites
- Website: www.jamk.fi/en

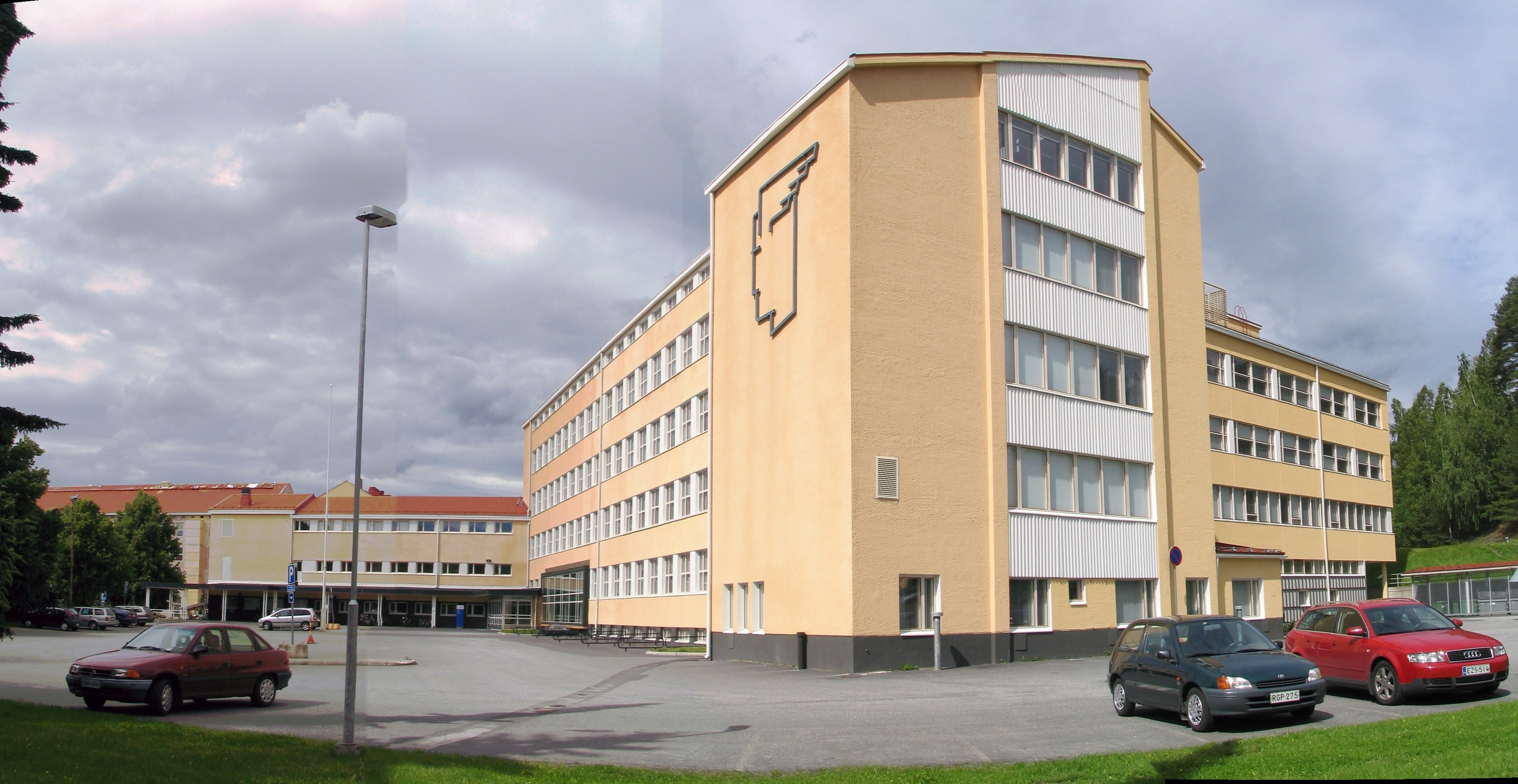
JAMK main campus.

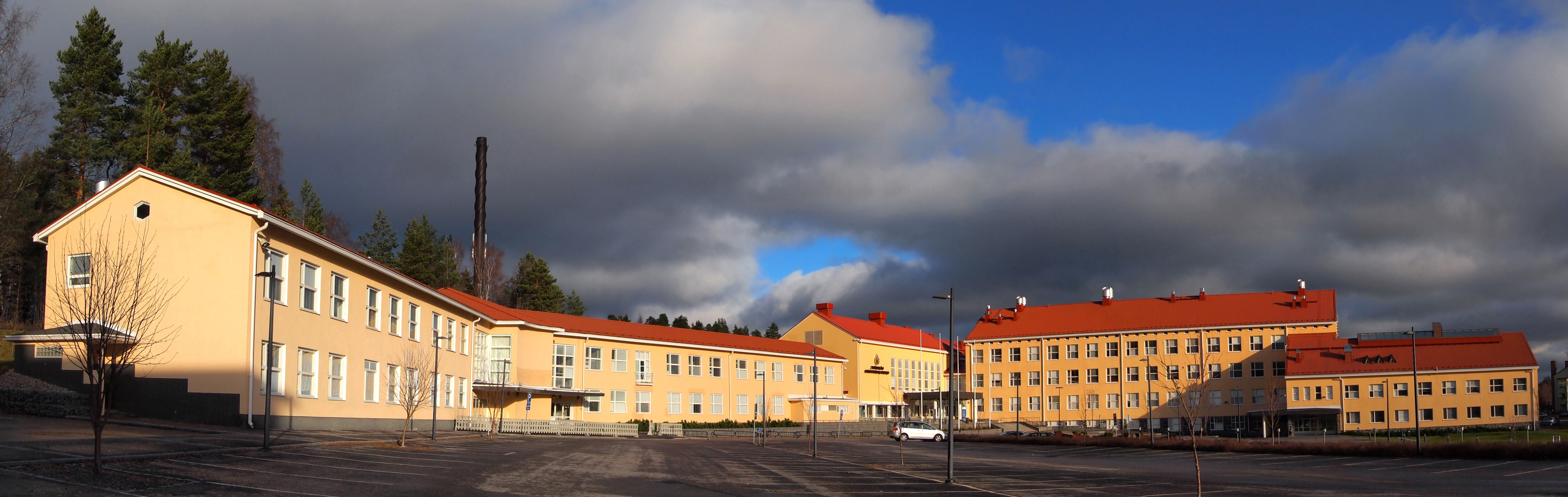
JAMK main campus (2008).

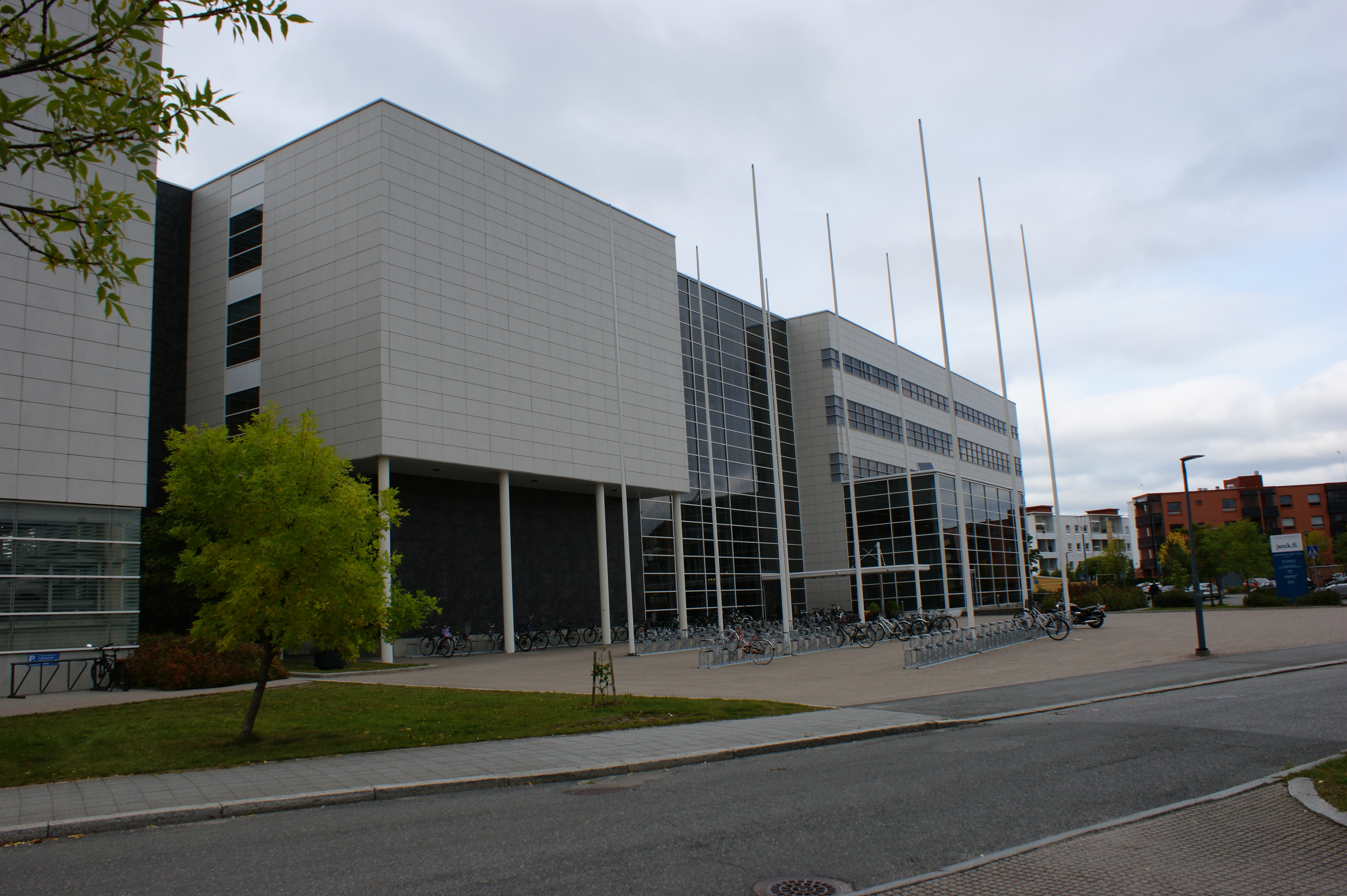
Lutakko campus (also known as Dynamo).

Jamk University of Applied Sciences (Finnish: Jyväskylän ammattikorkeakoulu) is a university of applied sciences (a polytechnic) in Finland, in the region of Central Finland. Jamk offers a wide variety of degree programmes in both Finnish and English as well as opportunities for open studies that students can complete either online or on campus, depending on the course. Working life-oriented research, development and innovation (RDI) work is one of the basic tasks of Jamk as a University of Applied Sciences.

Jamk University of Applied Sciences was also accepted as a member of the Erasmus+ European University E³UDRES² in 2022.

Jamk currently provides nine (9) master's degree programs in English.

Its campuses are located in Jyväskylä (Jamk Main Campus, Dynamo Campus, Finnish Music Campus) and Saarijärvi (Institute of Bioeconomy).
