= Qigong =

Chinese system of coordinated posture and movement, breathing, and meditation

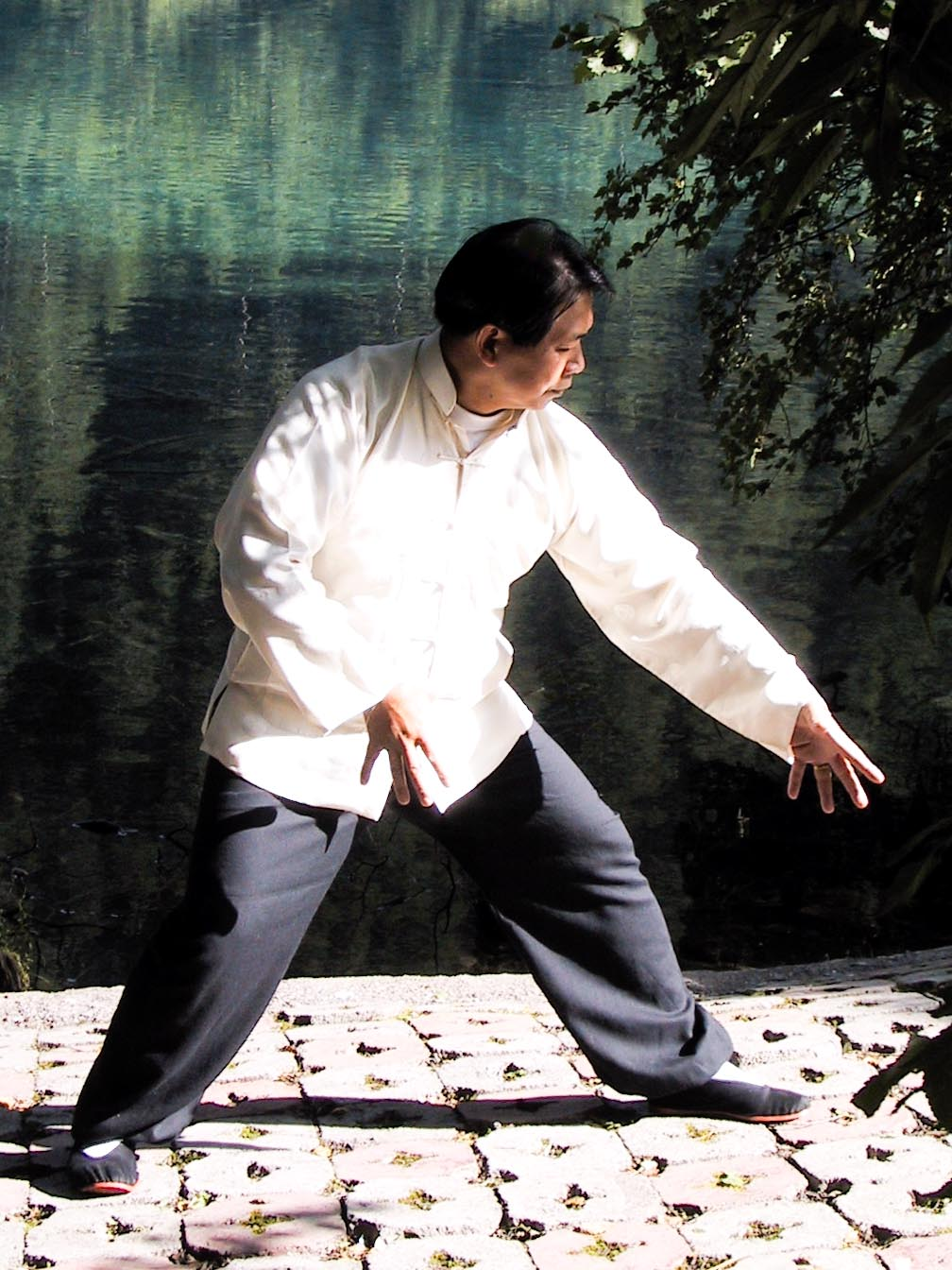
- Master Lam in Jiuzhaigou, Sichuan

Chinese name
- Traditional Chinese: 氣功
- Simplified Chinese: 气功
Transcriptions
Standard Mandarin
- Hanyu Pinyin: qìgōng
- Wade–Giles: ch'i^{4}-kung^{1}
- Tongyong Pinyin: cìgōng
- Yale Romanization: chìgūng
- IPA: [tɕʰîkʊ́ŋ]
Wu
- Romanization: chi^{去} khon^{平}
Yue: Cantonese
- Yale Romanization: heigūng
- Jyutping: hei3 gung1
- IPA: [hej˧.kʊŋ˥]
Southern Min
- Hokkien POJ: khì-kong

Vietnamese name
- Vietnamese: khí công
- Chữ Hán: 氣功

Korean name
- Hangul: 기공
- Hanja: 氣功
Transcriptions
- Revised Romanization: gigong

Mongolian name
- Mongolian Cyrillic: хийггон
Transcriptions
- SASM/GNC: khiiggong

Japanese name
- Kanji: 気功
- Kana: きこう
Transcriptions
- Romanization: kikō

Malay name
- Malay: qigong (چيڬوڠ)

Filipino name
- Tagalog: gigong

Qigong (/ˈtʃiː.ˈɡɒŋ/) (Note: Also written as chi kung, chi 'ung, or chi gung, from the Chinese (simplified Chinese: 气功; traditional Chinese: 氣功; pinyin: qìgōng; Wade–Giles: ch'i kung; lit. 'life-energy cultivation')) is a system of coordinated body-posture and movement, breathing, and meditation said to be useful for the purposes of health, spirituality, and martial arts training. With roots in Chinese medicine, philosophy, and martial arts, qigong is traditionally viewed by the Chinese and throughout Asia as a practice to cultivate and balance the mystical life-force qi.

Qigong practice typically involves moving meditation, coordinating slow-flowing movement, deep rhythmic breathing, and a calm meditative state of mind. People practice qigong throughout China and worldwide for recreation, exercise, relaxation, preventive medicine, self-healing, alternative medicine, meditation, self-cultivation, and training for martial arts.

== Etymology ==
Qigong (Pinyin), ch'i kung (Wade-Giles), and chi gung (Yale) are romanizations of two Chinese words "qì" (氣) and "gōng" (功). Qi primarily means air, gas or breath but is often translated as a metaphysical concept of 'vital energy', referring to a supposed energy circulating through the body; though a more general definition is universal energy, including heat, light, and electromagnetic energy; and definitions often involve breath, air, gas, or the relationship between matter, energy, and spirit. Qi is the central underlying principle in traditional Chinese medicine and martial arts. Gong (or kung) is often translated as cultivation or work, and definitions include practice, skill, mastery, merit, achievement, service, result, or accomplishment, and is often used to mean gongfu (kung fu) in the traditional sense of achievement through great effort. The two words are combined to describe systems to cultivate and balance life energy, especially for health and wellbeing.

The term qigong as currently used was promoted in the late 1940s through the 1950s to refer to a broad range of Chinese self-cultivation exercises, and to emphasize health and scientific approaches, while de-emphasizing spiritual practices, mysticism, and elite lineages.

In the 1957 first edition of "Qigong Therapy Practice" by Liu Guizhen —the first published and publicly available book on qigong—it was noted that qigong was originally used to strengthen the body and promote health and longevity. Over time, it evolved into a method for treating diseases. The practice involves mastering specific postures and breathing techniques, focusing on restoring the body's natural physiological functions without relying on medication or surgery. Maintaining a calm state and focusing on breath control are essential during therapy. In the 1982 second edition of the book, the author provided a modern definition of Qigong: "…the training of the body, breath, and mind as a means to cultivate the body's vital energy (Qi), with the aim of preventing illness and prolonging life. Based on classical theory, we named this self-exercise method, which focuses on cultivating Qi, 'Qigong'".

== History and origins ==
=== Roots and traditions ===
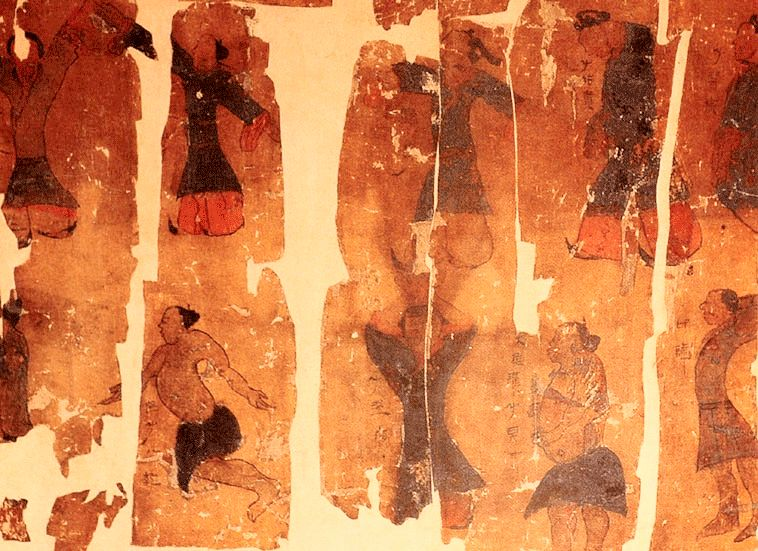
The physical exercise chart; a painting on silk depicting the practice of daoyin; unearthed in 1973 in Hunan Province, China, from the 2nd-century BC Western Han burial site of Mawangdui Han tombs site, Tomb Number 3.

With roots in ancient Chinese culture dating back more than 2,000 years, a wide variety of qigong forms have developed within different segments of Chinese society: in traditional Chinese medicine for preventive and curative functions; in Confucianism to promote longevity and improve moral character; in Taoism and Buddhism as part of meditative practice; and in Chinese martial arts to enhance self defending abilities. Contemporary qigong blends diverse and sometimes disparate traditions, in particular the Taoist meditative practice of "internal alchemy" (neidan), the ancient meditative practices of "circulating qi" (xingqi) and "standing meditation" (zhan zhuang), and the slow gymnastic breathing exercise of "guiding and pulling" (daoyin). Traditionally, qigong was taught by master to students through training and oral transmission, with an emphasis on meditative practice by scholars and gymnastic or dynamic practice by the working masses.

=== From 1949 to 1999: the qigong boom ===
Starting in the late 1940s and the 1950s, the mainland Chinese government tried to integrate disparate qigong approaches into one coherent system, with the intention of establishing a firm scientific basis for qigong practice. In 1949, Liu Guizhen established the name "qigong" to refer to the system of life-preserving practices that he and his associates developed, based on daoyin and other philosophical traditions. This attempt is considered by some sinologists as the start of the modern or scientific interpretation of qigong.

In the mid-1960s, qigong was criticised and banned in China.

In 1979, qigong's reputation was rehabilitated thanks to high level supporters, such as scientist Qian Xuesen, General Zhang Zhenhuan, and Sports Minister Wu Shaozu. Qigong was officially recognised and deemed a component of Chinese medicine with healing benefits and scientific value. With the backing of prominent figures such as Qian, research into the paranormal aspects of Qigong gained traction within the Chinese scientific community during the 1980s. Qian advocated for the creation of "somatic science" (人体科学, renti kexue) which would address "exceptional functions of the human body", including abilities such as telepathy, photokinesis, and clairvoyance. However, these claims failed to produce replicable scientific evidence and the movement was criticized as pseudoscientific.

In 1985, the state-run China Qigong Science and Research Society was established to regulate the nation's qigong denominations and activities of Qigong Masters. Popularity of qigong grew rapidly through the 1990s with estimates of between 60 and 200 million practitioners throughout China.

Along with popularity and state sanction came controversy and problems: claims of extraordinary abilities bordering on the supernatural, pseudoscience explanations to build credibility, a mental condition labeled qigong deviation, formation of cults, and exaggeration of claims by masters for personal benefit.

From the early 1990s, Chinese authorities and critics had increasingly questioned qigong organizations and practises as being unscientific. The efforts to establish qigong science as a scientific field failed to produce replicable experimental evidence for its claims, leading to declining support in scientific and political circles and became a target of ridicule.

=== Control and crackdown ===
In 1999, in response to widespread revival of old traditions of spirituality, morality, and mysticism, and perceived challenges to State control, the Chinese government took measures to enforce control of public qigong practice, including shutting down qigong clinics and hospitals, and banning groups such as Zhong Gong and Falun Gong. Since the 1999 crackdown, qigong research and practice have only been officially supported in the context of health and traditional Chinese medicine. The Chinese Health Qigong Association, established in 2000, strictly regulates public qigong practice, with limitation of public gatherings, requirement of state approved training and certification of instructors, and restriction of practice to state-approved forms.

== Overview ==
=== Practices ===
Qigong comprises a diverse set of practices that coordinate body (調身), breath (調息), and mind (調心) based on Chinese philosophy. Practices include moving and still meditation, massage, chanting, sound meditation, and non-contact treatments, performed in a broad array of body postures. Qigong is commonly classified into two foundational categories: 1) dynamic or active qigong (dong gong), with slow flowing movement; and 2) meditative or passive qigong (jing gong), with still positions and inner movement of the breath. From a therapeutic perspective, qigong can be classified into two systems: 1) internal qigong, which focuses on self-care and self-cultivation, and; 2) external qigong, which involves treatment by a therapist who directs or transmits qi.

As moving meditation, qigong practice typically coordinates slow stylized movement, deep diaphragmatic breathing, and calm mental focus, with visualization of guiding qi through the body. While implementation details vary, generally qigong forms can be characterized as a mix of four types of practice: dynamic, static, meditative, and activities requiring external aids.

- Dynamic practice

involves fluid movement, usually carefully choreographed, coordinated with breath and awareness. Examples include the slow stylized movements of tai chi, baguazhang, and xingyiquan. Other examples include graceful movement that mimics the motion of animals in Five Animals (Wu Qin Xi qigong), White Crane, and Wild Goose (Dayan) Qigong. As a form of gentle exercise, qigong is composed of movements that are typically repeated, strengthening and stretching the body, increasing fluid movement (blood, synovial, and lymph), enhancing balance and proprioception, and improving the awareness of how the body moves through space.

- Static practice

involves holding postures for sustained periods of time. In some cases this bears resemblance to the practice of Yoga and its continuation in the Buddhist tradition. For example Yiquan, a Chinese martial art derived from xingyiquan, emphasizes static stance training. In another example, the healing form Eight Pieces of Brocade (Baduanjin qigong) is based on a series of static postures.

- Meditative practice

utilizes breath awareness, visualization, mantra, chanting, sound, and focus on philosophical concepts such as qi circulation, aesthetics, or moral values. In traditional Chinese medicine and Daoist practice, the meditative focus is commonly on cultivating qi in dantian energy centers and balancing qi flow in meridian and other pathways. In various Buddhist traditions, the aim is to still the mind, either through outward focus, for example on a place, or through inward focus on the breath, a mantra, a koan, emptiness, or the idea of the eternal. In the Confucius scholar tradition, meditation is focused on humanity and virtue, with the aim of self-enlightenment.

- Use of external agents

Many systems of qigong practice include the use of external agents such as ingestion of herbs, massage, physical manipulation, or interaction with other living organisms. For example, specialized food and drinks are used in some medical and Daoist forms, whereas massage and body manipulation are sometimes used in martial arts forms. In some medical systems a qigong master uses non-contact treatment, purportedly guiding qi through his or her own body into the body of another person.

=== Forms ===
There are numerous qigong forms. 75 ancient forms that can be found in ancient literature and also 56 common or contemporary forms have been described in a qigong compendium. The list is by no means exhaustive. Many contemporary forms were developed by people who had recovered from their illness after qigong practice.

=== Techniques ===
Whether viewed from the perspective of exercise, health, philosophy, or martial arts training, several main principles emerge concerning the practice of qigong:

- Intentional movement: careful, flowing balanced style
- Rhythmic breathing: slow, deep, coordinated with fluid movement
- Awareness: calm, focused meditative state
- Visualization: of qi flow, philosophical tenets, aesthetics
- Chanting/Sound: use of sound as a focal point

Additional principles:

- Softness: soft gaze, expressionless face
- Solid Stance: firm footing, erect spine
- Relaxation: relaxed muscles, slightly bent joints
- Balance and Counterbalance: motion over the center of gravity

Advanced goals:

- Equanimity: more fluid, more relaxed
- Tranquility: empty mind, high awareness
- Stillness: smaller and smaller movements, eventually to complete stillness

The most advanced practice is generally considered to be with little or no motion.

== Traditional and classical theory ==
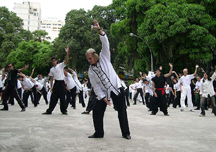
Qigong practitioners in Brazil

Over time, five distinct traditions or schools of qigong developed in China, each with its own theories and characteristics: Chinese medical qigong, Daoist qigong, Buddhist qigong, Confucian qigong, and "martial" qigong. All of these qigong traditions include practices intended to cultivate and balance qi.

=== Chinese medicine and qigong ===
The theories of ancient Chinese qigong include the yin and yang and Five Elements Theory, the Three Treasures Theory, Zang-Xiang Theory, Meridians, and the qi-Blood Theory, which have been synthesized as part of Traditional Chinese Medicine (TCM). TCM aims to identify and correct underlying disharmony, addressing deficiency and excess by utilizing the complementary and opposing forces of yin and yang, to create a balanced flow of qi. Qi is believed to be cultivated and stored in three main dantian energy centers and to travel through the body along twelve main meridians, with numerous smaller branches and tributaries. The main meridians correspond to twelve main organs. Qi is balanced in terms of yin and yang in the context of the traditional system of Five Elements. It is understood that illness and disease emerge when qi becomes diminished, unbalanced, or stagnant. Health is believed to be returned and maintained by rebuilding qi, eliminating qi blockages, and correcting qi imbalances. Although not all TCM concepts align with modern science and medicine, they are widely adopted by practitioners throughout East Asia and are increasingly used in the West to treat patients.

=== Daoist Qigong ===
In Daoism, various practices now known as Daoist qigong are claimed to provide a way to achieve longevity and spiritual realization, as well as a closer connection with the natural world. Daoist Qigong found its philosophical roots in the Dao De Jing. Its featured techniques of internal elixir emerged in the Eastern Han dynasty and reached a level of maturity in the Ming and Qing dynasty. The Ming dynasty compendium Chifeng sui, written by a Daoist ascetic, lists various qigong-based "longevity methods".

=== Buddhism ===
Meditative practices are part of a spiritual path that leads to enlightenment or Buddhahood. They are considered by some as Buddhist qigong.

=== Confucianism ===
In Confucianism practices now known as Confucian qigong provide a means to become a Junzi (君子) through awareness of morality. Confucian qigong can include dynamic exercise or static meditation, as well as cultivation of the mind to achieve "noble spirit".

== Contemporary qigong ==
In contemporary China, the emphasis of qigong practice has shifted away from traditional philosophy, spiritual attainment, and folklore, and increasingly to health benefits, traditional medicine and martial arts applications, and a scientific perspective. Qigong is now practiced by millions worldwide, primarily for its health benefits, though many practitioners have also adopted traditional philosophical, medical, or martial arts perspectives, and even use the long history of qigong as evidence of its effectiveness.

=== Contemporary Chinese medical qigong ===
Qigong has been recognized as a "standard medical technique" in China since 1989, and is sometimes included in the medical curriculum of major universities in China. The 2013 English translation of the official Chinese medical gigong textbook used in China defines CMQ as "the skill of body-mind exercise that integrates body, breath, and mind adjustments into one" and emphasizes that qigong is based on "adjustment" (tiao 调, also translated as "regulation", "tuning", or "alignment") of body, breath, and mind. As such, qigong is viewed by practitioners as being more than common physical exercise, because qigong combines postural, breathing, and mental training in one to produce a particular psychophysiological state of being. While CMQ is still based on traditional and classical theory, modern practitioners also emphasize the importance of a strong scientific basis. According to the 2013 CMQ textbook, physiological effects of qigong are numerous, and include improvement of respiratory and cardiovascular function, and possibly neurophysiological function.

=== Integrative, complementary, and alternative medicine ===
Integrative medicine (IM) refers to "the blending of conventional and complementary medicines and therapies with the aim of using the most appropriate of either or both modalities to care for the patient as a whole", whereas complementary is using a non-mainstream approach together with conventional medicine, while alternative is using a non-mainstream approach in place of conventional medicine. Qigong is used by integrative medicine practitioners to complement conventional medical treatment, based on complementary and alternative medicine interpretations of the effectiveness and safety of qigong.

== Practitioners, uses and cautions ==
=== Recreation and popular use ===
People practice qigong for many different reasons, including for recreation, exercise and relaxation, preventive medicine and self-healing, meditation and self-cultivation, and training for martial arts. Practitioners range from athletes to people with disabilities. Because it is low impact and can be done lying, sitting, or standing, qigong is accessible for people with disabilities, seniors, and people recovering from injuries.

=== Meditation and self-cultivation ===
Qigong is practiced for meditation and self-cultivation as part of various philosophical and spiritual traditions. As meditation, qigong is a means to still the mind and enter a state of consciousness that brings serenity, clarity, and bliss. Many practitioners find qigong, with its gentle focused movement, to be more accessible than seated meditation.

Qigong for self-cultivation can be classified in terms of traditional Chinese philosophy: Daoist, Buddhist, and Confucian.

=== Martial arts applications ===
The practice of qigong is an important component in both internal and external style Chinese martial arts. Focus on qi is considered to be a source of power as well as the foundation of the internal style of martial arts (neijia). Tai chi, xingyiquan, and baguazhang are representative of the types of Chinese martial arts that rely on the concept of qi as the foundation. Extraordinary feats of martial arts prowess, such as the ability to withstand heavy strikes (Iron Shirt, 鐵衫) and the ability to break hard objects (Iron Palm, 鐵掌; alt. 鐵絲掌, 鐵沙掌, or 鐵砂掌) are abilities attributed to qigong training.

=== Tai chi and qigong ===
Tai chi is a widely practiced Chinese internal martial style based on the theory of taiji, closely associated with qigong, and typically involving more complex choreographed movement coordinated with breath, done slowly for health and training, or quickly for self-defense. Many scholars consider tai chi to be a type of qigong, traced back to an origin in the seventeenth century. In modern practice, qigong typically focuses more on health and meditation rather than martial applications, and plays an important role in training for tai chi, in particular used to build strength, develop breath control, and increase vitality ("life energy").

=== Therapeutic use ===
Qigong has shown therapeutic benefits in various health conditions. Research suggests in patients with chronic obstructive pulmonary disease (COPD), Qigong has been found to improve lung function, exercise capacity, and quality of life. Qigong exercise shows therapeutic efficacy in alleviating fibromyalgia symptoms including pain, sleep quality, fatigue, anxiety, depression, and fibromyalgia impact, as per a pilot randomized clinical trial. Moreover, studies have indicated Qigong-based exercises may be effective for alleviating depression symptoms in individuals with major depressive disorder and future well-designed, randomized controlled trials with large sample sizes are needed to confirm these findings.

=== Safety and cost ===
Qigong is generally viewed as safe. No adverse effects have been observed in clinical trials, such that qigong is considered safe for use across diverse populations. Cost for self-care is minimal, and cost efficiencies are high for group delivered care. Typically the cautions associated with qigong are the same as those associated with any physical activity, including risk of muscle strains or sprains, advisability of stretching to prevent injury, general safety for use alongside conventional medical treatments, and consulting with a physician when combining with conventional treatment.

== Clinical research ==
=== Overview ===
Only a limited number of studies on Qigong meet accepted medical and scientific standards of randomized controlled trials (RCTs). Clinical research concerning qigong has been conducted for a wide range of medical conditions, including bone density, cardiopulmonary effects, physical function, falls and related risk factors, quality of life, immune function, inflammation, hypertension, pain, and cancer treatment.

=== Conventional medicine ===
Although some clinical trials support qigong's effectiveness in treating medically diagnosed conditions, the quality of these studies is mostly low and, overall, their results are mixed.

=== Systematic reviews ===
A 2009 systematic review on the effect of qigong exercises on reducing pain concluded that "the existing trial evidence is not convincing enough to suggest that internal qigong is an effective modality for pain management."

A 2010 systematic review of the effect of qigong exercises on cancer treatment concluded "the effectiveness of qigong in cancer care is not yet supported by the evidence from rigorous clinical trials." A separate systematic review that looked at the effects of qigong exercises on various physiological or psychological outcomes found that the available studies were poorly designed, with a high risk of bias in the results. Therefore, the authors concluded, "Due to limited number of RCTs in the field and methodological problems and high risk of bias in the included studies, it is still too early to reach a conclusion about the efficacy and the effectiveness of qigong exercise as a form of health practice adopted by the cancer patients during their curative, palliative, and rehabilitative phases of the cancer journey."

A 2011 overview of systematic reviews of controlled clinical trials, Lee et al. concluded that "the effectiveness of qigong is based mostly on poor quality research" and "therefore, it would be unwise to draw firm conclusions at this stage." Although a 2010 comprehensive literature review found 77 peer-reviewed RCTs, Lee et al.'s overview of systematic reviews as to particular health conditions found problems like sample size, lack of proper control groups, with lack of blinding associated with high risk of bias.

A 2015 systematic review of the effect of qigong exercises on cardiovascular diseases and hypertension found no conclusive evidence for effect. Also in 2015, a systemic review into the effects on hypertension suggested that it may be effective, but that the evidence was not conclusive because of the poor quality of the trials it included, and advised more rigorous research in the future. Another 2015 systematic review of qigong on biomarkers of cardiovascular disease concluded that some trials showed favorable effects, but concludes, "Most of the trials included in this review are likely to be at high risk of bias, so we have very low confidence in the validity of the results.

In 2026, the British Journal of Sports Medicine published an umbrella review of systematic reviews with meta-analyses, that covered 92 meta-analyses from 1,744 randomised controlled trials investigating traditional Chinese exercises (TCE), including qigong practises such as Baduanjin, Wuqinxi and Yijinjing, as well as tai chi, for people with musculoskeletal disorders. Applying the GRADE framework, the authors found that 23 outcome associations were supported by high-certainty evidence and 179 by moderate-certainty evidence. High-certainty evidence showed that TCEs significantly improved physical function in people with knee osteoarthritis, enhanced mental health in patients with knee osteoarthritis and neck pain, and improved sleep quality in people with fibromyalgia. Tai chi also significantly reduced chronic musculoskeletal-disorder-related pain and stiffness and increased bone mineral density in participants with osteopenia or osteoporosis. The authors found that the greatest benefits were seen in those who practised for more than six months, at least three times a week, and for a total of at least 150 minutes per week.

=== Mental health ===
Many claims have been made that qigong can benefit or ameliorate mental health conditions, including improved mood, decreased stress reaction, and decreased anxiety and depression. Most medical studies have only examined psychological factors as secondary goals, although various studies have shown decreases in cortisol levels, a chemical hormone produced by the body in response to stress.

=== China ===
Basic and clinical research in China during the 1980s was mostly descriptive, and few results were reported in peer-reviewed English-language journals. Qigong became known outside China in the 1990s, and clinical randomized controlled trials investigating the effectiveness of qigong on health and mental conditions began to be published worldwide, along with systematic reviews.

=== Challenges ===
Most existing clinical trials have small sample sizes and many have inadequate controls. Of particular concern is the impracticality of double blinding using appropriate sham treatments, and the difficulty of placebo control, such that benefits often cannot be distinguished from the placebo effect. Also of concern is the choice of which qigong form to use and how to standardize the treatment or amount with respect to the skill of the practitioner leading or administering treatment, the tradition of individualization of treatments, and the treatment length, intensity, and frequency.

== See also ==
- Hua Tuo
- Neigong
- Paidagong
- Buddhist meditation
- Asahi Health
- World Tai Chi and Qigong Day
- Falun Gong
