= Chryse (ancient Greek placename) =

Chryse (Ancient Greek: Χρύση) is a name occurring in Ancient Greek geography, reported by ancient authors to have referred to the following places:

- Chryse (island), a former island in the Mediterranean where, in Greek mythology Philoctetes was bitten by a snake. This island is underwater now.
- Chryse and Argyre, one of a pair of legendary islands in the Indian Ocean said to be made of gold and silver
- Chryse, a town mentioned in Homer's Iliad, from which Agamemnon took Chryseis
- Chrysē nēsos (Golden Island), an ancient poetical name for the island Thasos, for its gold mines
- Chryse, a promontory of Lemnos opposite Tenedos
- Chryse (Aeolis), a town of ancient Aeolis, now in Turkey
- Chryse (Lesbos), Lesbos, a place in Greece
- Chryse (Troad), a town of the ancient Troad, now in Turkey
- Chryse, Skyros, a village or place in Ancient Greece
- Chryse (Caria), a place in the area of Halicarnassus, now in Turkey
- Chryse (Hellespont), located between Ophrynion and Abydos
- Chryse (Bithynia), close to Chalcedon
- Chryse, Gaidaronisi, an island near Crete
- Isle of Chryse, a term in classical antiquity for the Malay peninsula or Sumatra

== See also ==
- Chrysa, Athens, a section around Pnyx
