= Longfeng Baochai Yuan =

1964–1966 serialised novel by Liang Yusheng

- Author: Liang Yusheng
- Original title: 龍鳳寶釵緣
- Language: Chinese
- Genre: Wuxia
- Set in: 8th-century China
- Publisher: Ta Kung Pao
- Publication date: 25 June 1964 - 15 May 1966
- Publication place: Hong Kong
- Media type: Print
- ISBN: 9789861465647
- Preceded by: Datang Youxia Zhuan
- Followed by: Huijian Xinmo

Longfeng Baochai Yuan
- Traditional Chinese: 龍鳳寶釵緣
- Simplified Chinese: 龙凤宝钗缘
- Literal meaning: Romance of the Dragon and Phoenix Hairpins
Transcriptions
Standard Mandarin
- Hanyu Pinyin: Lóngfèng Bǎochāi Yuán
Yue: Cantonese
- Jyutping: Lung^{4} Fung^{6} Bou^{2} Caai^{1} Jyun^{4}

Longfeng Baochai Yuan (龍鳳寶釵緣), literally Romance of the Dragon and Phoenix Hairpins, is a wuxia novel by Liang Yusheng. It was first published as a serial between 25 June 1964 and 15 May 1966 in the Hong Kong newspaper Ta Kung Pao. The second part of a trilogy, it continues the saga begun in Datang Youxia Zhuan and precedes Huijian Xinmo.

Set in eighth-century China during the Tang dynasty amidst the aftermath of the An Lushan rebellion, the novel intertwines romance, revenge, and political intrigue through the story of Duan Keye and Shi Ruomei, whose fates are bound by their parents' promise and the symbolic Dragon and Phoenix Hairpins. Blending historical events with chivalric ideals, Longfeng Baochai Yuan explores themes of loyalty, misunderstanding, and moral integrity within a turbulent age.

== Publication history ==
Longfeng Baochai Yuan was first published as a serial between 25 June 1964 and 15 May 1966 in the Hong Kong newspaper Ta Kung Pao. Subsequent reprints include a 1986 edition by Inner Mongolia People's Publishing House, a 1988 edition by Heilongjiang People's Publishing House, a 1988 three-volume edition by Chinese and Foreign Cultural Publishing House, 1993 and 1996 three-volume editions by Cosmos Books, a 1996 two-volume edition by Guangdong Travel and Tourism Press, and a 2012 two-volume edition by the Sun Yat-Sen University Press.

== Plot summary ==
The novel is set in eighth-century China during the Tang dynasty. 16 years ago, close friends Duan Guizhang and Shi Yiru had arranged a marriage between their children – Duan Keye and Shi Ruomei – and sealed the pact by exchanging a pair of hairpins. Both men had died during the An Lushan rebellion, leaving their children to unknowingly inherit the promise.

Duan Keye, upon learning of his background, sets out to find his fiancée. Meanwhile, Shi Ruomei is adopted and raised by Xue Song under the name "Hongxian". When they first meet, Duan Keye and Shi Ruomei have deep misunderstandings towards each other which are later resolved with help from Shi Ruomei's childhood friend Nie Yinniang.

Meanwhile, Tie Mole, the protagonist of the first novel, is nominated to be chief of the wulin, but he faces competition from a rising star, Mou Shijie, whom he concedes to in order to avoid a power struggle like the one between the Dous and Wangs. As the story progresses, Mou Shijie reveals himself to be a power-hungry hypocrite. The heroes work together to thwart his schemes, culminating in a final confrontation where his treachery is exposed and he commits suicide.

In the aftermath, Tie Mole becomes the new chief of the wulin, while Duan Keye and Shi Ruomei are married, fulfilling the pact sealed by their parents.

== Principal characters ==
- Duan Keye (段克邪) – Duan Guizhang and Dou Xianniang's son who is raised by Xia Lingshuang.
- Shi Ruomei (史若梅) / Hongxian (紅線) – Shi Yiru and Lu Mengdie's daughter who is raised by Xue Song.
- Nie Yinniang (聶隱娘) – a highly-skilled swordswoman and Shi Ruomei's friend.
- Fang Bifu (方辟符) – a swordsman who is Nie Yinniang's romantic partner.
- Tie Mole (鐵摩勒) – an outlaw leader who becomes chief of the wulin.
- Mou Shijie (牟世傑) – a descendant of Qiuranke (虯髯客) and the chief of the wulin.
- Shi Chaoying (史朝英) – Shi Siming's daughter and Mou Shijie's wife.
- Xue Song (薛嵩) – the military governor of Luzhou and Shi Ruomei's foster father.

== Reception and legacy ==
Longfeng Baochai Yuan shifts in tone from Datang Youxia Zhuan. While the latter is praised for its historical setting and chivalric elements, the former emphasises emotional conflict, romantic entanglements, and moral nuances against a backdrop of political turmoil. Critics have noted that this shift illustrates a transition in Liang Yusheng's writing style to blend psychological depth with martial-arts and historical elements.

Nie Yinniang, one of the main characters, has been highlighted by commentators as a particularly compelling character for her courage, principled stance, and emotional agency in adversity. Some essays also contrast her with other female characters in Liang Yusheng's wuxia novels whose motivations are more conflicted or morally ambivalent.
