= K'un-lun po =

Ancient sailing ship from Java or Sumatra

History
- Name: K'un-lun po, Kun-lun po, Kunlun po, K'un-lun bo, Kun-lun bo, Kunlun bo, kolandiapha, kolandiapha onta, kolandiaphonta, kolandia, colandia, 崑崙舶

General characteristics
- Type: Sailing ship
- Displacement: 1667 to 2778 tons
- Tons burthen: 1000 to 1667 tons
- Length: More than 50 metres (164.04 ft) or 60 metres (196.85 ft)
- Sail plan: Tanja sail

K'un-lun po (also called Kun-lun po, Kunlun po, or K'un-lun bo; Chinese: 崑崙舶) were ancient sailing ships used by Austronesian sailors from Maritime Southeast Asia, described by Chinese records from the Han dynasty. In the first millennium AD, these ships connected trade routes between India and China. Ships of this type were still in use until at least the 14th century.

== Description ==
The characteristics of this ship are that it is large (more than 50–60 m long), the hull is made of multiple plankings, has no outrigger, mounted with many masts and sails, the sail is in the form of a tanja sail, and has a plank fastening technique in the form of stitching with plant fibers.

These ships are observed by the Chinese as visiting their southeastern ports and identified as K'un-lun po (or bo), which means "ships of the southern people". They were not made by the people around the Malacca straits, large shipbuilding industry only existed in the eastern half of Java.

== History ==
Greek astronomer Ptolemy said in his work Geography (ca. 150 AD) that huge ships came from the east of India. This was also confirmed by an anonymous work called Periplus Marae Erythraensis. Both mention a type of ship called kolandiaphonta (also known as kolandia, kolandiapha, and kolandiapha onta), which is a straightforward transcription of the Chinese word K'un-lun po—meaning "ships of Kun-lun". K'un-lun is a rather broad term, it may be an ethnolinguistic term or a region consisting of southern mainland of Southeast Asia and the Maritime Southeast Asia, these include Java, Sumatra, Borneo, Champa, and Cambodia.

The 3rd century book Strange Things of the South (南州異物志 — Nánzhōu Yìwùzhì) by Wan Chen (萬震) describes ships capable of carrying 600–700 people together with more than 10,000 hu (斛) of cargo (250–1000 tons according to various interpretations—600 tons deadweight according to Manguin). These ships came from K'un-lun. The ships are called K'un-lun po (or K'un-lun bo), could be more than 50 meters in length and had a freeboard of 5.2–7.8 meters. (Note: In the original text, the length of the ship is listed as 20 chang or more and the freeboard 2–3 chang. Here 1 chang (or zhang) is taken as 2.6 meters.) When seen from above they resemble covered galleries. Wan Chen explains the ships' sail design as follows:

The people of foreign parts call ships po. The large ones are more than fifty meters in length and stand out of the water four to five meters (...) They carry from six to seven hundred persons, with 10,000 bushels of cargo. (Note: According to various interpretations, from 250 to 1000 tons) The people beyond the barriers, according to the size of their ships, sometimes rig (as many as) four sails which they carry in row from bow to stern. (...) The four sails do not face directly forward, but are set obliquely, and so arranged that they can all be fixed in the same direction, to receive the wind and to spill it. Those sails which are behind the most windward one receiving the pressure of the wind, throw it from one to the other, so that they all profit from its force. If it is violent, (the sailors) diminish or augment the surface of the sails according to the conditions. This oblique rig, which permits the sails to receive from one another the breath of the wind, obviates the anxiety attendant upon having high masts. Thus these ships sail without avoiding strong winds and dashing waves, by the aid of which they can make great speed.

— Wan Chen, Strange Things of the South

A 260 CE book by K'ang T'ai (康泰), quoted in Taiping Yulan (982 AD) described ships with seven sails called po or ta po (great ship or great junk) that could travel as far as Syria (大秦—Ta-chin, Roman Syria). These ships were used by the Indo-Scythian (月支—Yuezhi) traders for transporting horses. He also made reference to monsoon trade between the islands (or archipelago), which took a month and a few days in a large po. The word "po" might be derived from the Old Javanese parahu, Javanese word prau, or the Malay word perahu, which means large ship. Note that in modern usage, perahu refers to a small boat.

Faxian (Fa-Hsien) in his return journey to China from India (413–414) embarked a ship carrying 200 passengers and sailors from K'un-lun which towed a smaller ship. A cyclone struck and forced the passengers to move into the smaller ship. The crew of the smaller ship feared that the ship would be overloaded, therefore they cut the rope and separated from the big ship. Luckily the bigger ship survived, the passengers were stranded in Ye-po-ti (Yawadwipa—Java). After 5 months, the crew and the passengers embarked on another ship comparable in size to sail back to China. In I-ch'ieh-ching yin-i, a dictionary compiled by Huei-lin ca. 817 AD, po is mentioned several times:

Ssu-ma Piao, in his commentary on Chuang Tzü, said that large ocean-going ships are called "po". According to the Kuang Ya, (Note: Kuang Ya was a dictionary compiled by Chang I about 230 AD, while Ssu-ma Piao lived from ca. 240 to ca. 305 AD.) po is an ocean-going ship. It has a draught of 60 feet (18 m). (Note: Might be a mistranslation. A ship of such draught is manifestly absurd. Instead, it may refer to the height of the ship's hull, from the keel to the open deck. Pelliot proposed that the figure should be translated as "six or seven feet". See Pelliot, Paul. "Quelques textes chinois concernant l'Indochine hindouisśe." 1925. In: Etudes Asiatiques, publiées à l'occasion du 25e anniversaire de l'EFEO. Paris: EFEO, II: 243–263. p. 258.) It is fast and carries 1000 men as well as merchandise. It is also called k'un-lun-po. Many of those who form the crews and technicians of these ships are kunlun people. With the fibrous bark of the coconut tree, they make cords which bind the parts of the ship together (...). Nails and clamps are not used, for fear that the heating of the iron would give rise to fires. The ships are constructed by assembling several thicknesses of side planks, for the boards are thin and that they fear they would break. Their length is over 60 meters (...). Sails are hoisted to make use of the winds, and these ships cannot be propelled by the strength of the men alone.

Champa was assaulted by Javanese or Kunlun vessels in 774 and 787. In 774 an assault was launched on Po-Nagar in Nha-trang where the pirates demolished temples, while in 787 an assault was launched on Phang-rang. Several Champa coastal cities suffered naval raids and assault from Java. Java armadas was called as Javabala-sanghair-nāvāgataiḥ (fleets from Java) which are recorded in Champa epigraphs.

Pingzhou Ketan by Zhu Yu (made between 1111 and 1117 AD) mentioned sea-going ships of Kia-ling (訶陵 — Holing or Kalingga kingdom of Java), in which the large ships could carry several hundred men, and the smaller ones over a hundred men. The people of the Kalingga kingdom are the principal traders of Java, Sumatra, and possibly China. The ships described here were certainly not built or crewed by the Chinese.

Wang Dayuan's 1349 composition Daoyi Zhilüe Guangzheng Xia ("Description of the Barbarian of the Isles") described the so-called "horse boats" at a place called Gan-mai-li in Southeast Asia. These ships were bigger than normal trading ships, with the sides constructed from multiple planks. The ships uses neither nails or mortar to join them, instead they are using coconut fibre. The ships has two or three decks, with deckhouse over the upper deck. In the lower hold they carried pressed-down frankincense, above them they are carrying several hundred horses. Wang made special mention of these ships because pepper, which is also transported by them, carried to faraway places with large quantity. The normal trading ships carried less than 1/10 of their cargo.

== Controversy ==
Indian historians usually call this ship colandia (Tamil: சொழாந்தியம்), which they attribute to the Early Chola navy. Periplus Marae Erythraensis mentioned two varieties of vessels. The first kind, known as the Sangara, includes vessels both large and small. The second variety, called kolandiaphonta, was very large in size and these types of vessels were used for voyages to the Ganges and the Chryse, which was the name of various places occurring in ancient Greek geography. The Indians believe Chola had voyages from the ancient port of Puhar to the Pacific Islands.

It is now generally accepted that kolandiaphonta was a transcription of the Chinese term Kun-lun po, which refers to an Indonesian vessel. The Sangara is likely to have been derived from Indonesian twin-hulled vessels similar to Pacific catamarans.

== See also ==
- Borobudur ship
- Junk (ship)
- Jong (ship)
- Kunlun Nu
