= 大唐游俠傳 =

大唐游俠傳 or 大唐游侠传 may refer to:

- Datang Youxia Zhuan, a wuxia novel by Liang Yusheng
- Paladins in Troubled Times, 2008 Chinese television series adapted from Liang Yusheng's novel Datang Youxia Zhuan
