= Xianü =

Xianü may refer to:

- "Xianü (short story)", a short story by Pu Songling published in Strange Tales from a Chinese Studio
  - A Touch of Zen, a 1971 wuxia film based on the short story
- Romance of the White Haired Maiden (TV series), a 1999 television series alternatively titled Yidai Xianü.
