= Smintheion =

Ancient settlement and sanctuary of Troad

Coordinates: 39°32′10″N 26°07′04″E

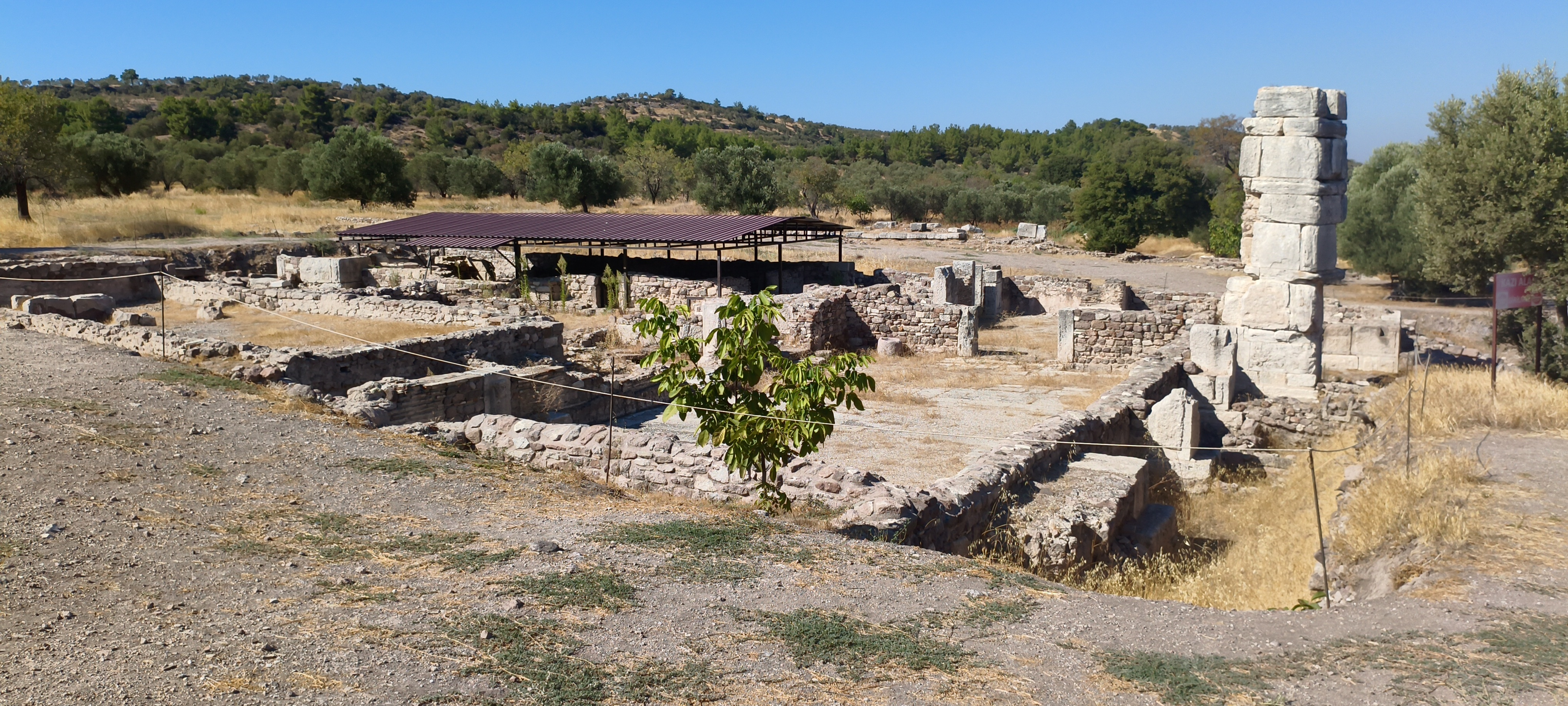

Smintheion or Smintheum was a town in ancient Troad, near Chryse, which contained a noted sanctuary of Apollo mentioned by Homer. The sanctuary was dedicated to Apollo Smintheus, a byname of Apollo associated with mice and rats. Here, Apollo was worshiped as the protector against a plague of mice that held the region in its grip at one point.

Its site is located near Külahlı (Gülpınar), Asiatic Turkey.
