= Xianü (short story) =

Short story by Pu Songling

- Short story by Pu Songling
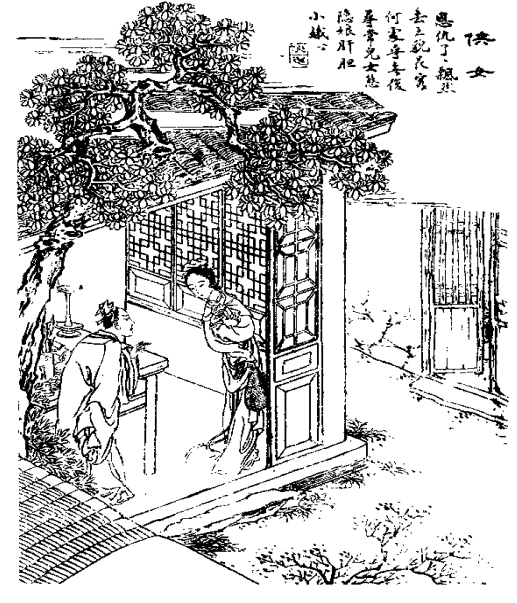
- Illustration from Xiangzhu liaozhai zhiyi tuyong (Liaozhai Zhiyi with commentary and illustrations; 1886)
- Original title: 俠女 (Xianü)
- Translator: Herbert Giles
- Country: China
- Language: Chinese
- Genres: Zhiguai; Short story

Publication
- Published in: Strange Tales from a Chinese Studio
- Media type: Print (Book)
- Publication date: 1740
- Published in English: 1880

Chronology
Old Man Zhu (祝翁)	The Drinking Buddy (酒友)

"Xianü" (traditional Chinese: 俠女; simplified Chinese: 侠女; pinyin: Xiá Nǚ; lit. 'Heroic Woman') is a short story by Pu Songling first published in Strange Tales from a Chinese Studio. The story follows the eponymous swordswoman, who rescues her neighbour from a fox spirit, before bearing him a son and avenging her father's death. Likely inspired by early Chinese literature featuring heroines known as nüxia, the story has received adaptations in popular media, for instance in the wuxia film A Touch of Zen (1971).

== Plot ==
A Jinling-based scholar (referred to only by surname Gu) who lives with his mother takes interest in his new neighbours, a mysterious young lady and her elderly mother; however, the lady rebuffs his initial attempts at becoming friends. Afterwards, Gu encounters a handsome stranger who soon becomes his homosexual lover. Meanwhile, the lady begins to come over to Gu's residence more frequently to help his mother with chores; the relations between the two households improve, with Gu even having sexual intercourse with the lady on one occasion. For the most part, however, she remains aloof towards Gu as well as his homosexual lover.

One night, the lady visits Gu in his room but they are interrupted by Gu's lover, who antagonises her. The lady unleashes a sword from her clothing and beheads him, revealing that he was a white fox spirit who had transformed into a human. The next evening, Gu and the lady make love for a second time but afterwards, Gu unsuccessfully proposes to her and she reverts to her frosty ways. Some time later, following the death of her mother, the lady reveals to Gu that she is eight months pregnant and tells him to make preparations.

The lady disappears for more than a month; Gu's mother pays her a visit when she returns, only to discover that the lady had already given birth some three days ago. The lady places her son in Gu's care and disappears for a few more nights. She returns carrying a head belonging to a political enemy who had murdered her father, who was a sima. Before leaving for good, she tells Gu that he will not live long, and that their son will become a successful scholar and government official. As prophesied, Gu dies three years later, whereas their son becomes a jinshi at age eighteen.

== Publication history ==
Originally titled "Xianü" (俠女), the story was first published in Pu Songling's 18th-century anthology of close to five hundred short stories, Liaozhai zhiyi or Strange Tales from a Chinese Studio. Various English translations of the story have been published, including "The Magnanimous Girl" by Herbert Giles (1880), "The Lady Knight-errant" by Y.W. Ma, and Joseph S.M. Lau (1978); "A Chivalrous Woman" by Denis C. and Victor H. Mair (1989); and "The Swordswoman" by Sidney L. Sondergard (2008). However, Giles' translation is heavily abridged, omitting mention of Gu's homosexual relationship with the fox spirit as well as the second half of the story in which the lady gives birth and avenges her father's death.

== Composition ==
The earliest fictional works pertaining to the nüxia (女俠) or "female knight-errant", like "Nie Yinniang" (聶隱娘) and "Hongxian" (紅線), date back to the Tang dynasty, although they only became popular from the late Ming dynasty onwards. Pu was evidently influenced by Tang nüxia stories; Karl S. Y. Yao suggests that Pu's main source was "Guren Qi" (賈人妻), whereas Roland Altenburger argues that "the most likely point of reference" for "Xianü" was "Cui Shensi" (崔慎思), given the "greatest number of common elements" that both stories share. Pu was believed to have written "Xianü" before 1688, making it one of the earlier Liaozhai zhiyi entries.

== Themes and analysis ==
Karl Yao observes that the eponymous heroine acts based on bao (報) or requital; for example, her affair with Gu is not sexually motivated; she only wishes to repay him for his kindness. According to Keith McMahon, "Xianü" is "the coldest" example of Pu's "trademark" use of "the woman's withdrawal", which entails an affair between a male and a female, typically a fox spirit or an immortal, being cut short when the female prematurely bids the male farewell. Sidney Sondergard suggests that "Xianü" is a "cautionary lesson": "Gu's initial impulse to be a filial son and care for his mother was subverted by his lustful infatuation with the fox."

== Adaptations ==
The critically acclaimed 1971 wuxia film A Touch of Zen directed by King Hu was based on "Xianü", although Hu "expanded the story with new material that filled in the gaps of female knight-errant's mysterious, supernatural origins." Furthermore, while Pu's short story is devoid of historical or political references, King Hu invites the viewer to consider "the place of women within Buddhist and martial culture". The protagonist Yang Huizhen (who is unnamed in the short story) was portrayed by Hsu Feng.
