= Colandia =

Ancient seagoing vessel

Colandia (Tamil pronunciation: [soɻɑːn̪d̪ɪjəm]; Tamil: சொழாந்தியம்) was a kind of vessel, that supposedly was used by Early Chola. Chola used two varieties of vessels. The first kind, known as the Sangara, including vessels both large and small. The second variety, called Colandia, was very large and these types of vessels were used for voyages to the Ganges and the Chryse, which was the name of various places occurring in Ancient Greek geography. Also, the Chola had voyages from the ancient port of Puhar to the Pacific Islands.

Another theory suggests that kolandiaphonta (also known as kolandiapha or kolandiapha onta) was a transcription of the Chinese term Kun-lun po, which refers to an Indonesian vessel. The Sangara is likely to have been derived from Indonesian twin-hulled vessels similar to Pacific catamarans.

== See also ==
- Ajanta caves boats
- Borobudur ship
- Junk (ship)
- Jong (ship)
- K'un-lun po
