= Hongxian =

Hongxian may refer to:

- Red thread of fate (紅線; hóngxiàn), invisible thread that connects destined lovers in traditional Chinese belief
- "The Tale of Hongxian", a Chinese legend about a female assassin named Hongxian (literally: Red Thread)
- Hongxian (洪憲; 1916), era name of Yuan Shikai's reign as Chinese Emperor
  - Hongxian Monarchy (Chinese: 洪憲帝制)

== See also ==
- Hung Sin Nui (1924–2013) or "Red Thread Girl", Cantonese opera performer
