= Luochong Lu =

Chinese historical document

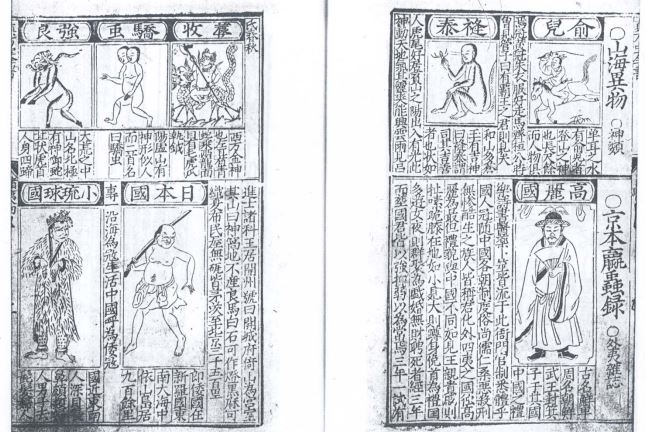
An excerpt from the Luochong lu showing Korean, Japanese and Ryukyuan ethnicities.

The Luochong lu (Chinese: 臝蟲錄; Wade–Giles: Lo-ch'ung-lu) or Record of Naked Creatures was a Chinese Ming dynasty gazetteer which discussed foreign countries and cultures.

Updated from the earlier text Yiyu tuzhi (Illustrated Account of Foreign Lands), which was in turn based on the fourteenth-century Yiwu Zhi (Account of Foreign Lands), the Luochong lu was a popular work during the Ming era and was reprinted many times, both as a standalone title and within anthologies and encyclopedias. The text was printed from woodblocks, with illustrations. Although the content dealt primarily with nations outside China itself, there were entries for ethnic groups within China, as well as for mythical countries. It covered the Asian subcontinent, Africa, Europe and the Middle East.

Both the illustrations and the content served to encourage a divide between the ethnic Chinese and the other races listed, emphasising the "animal" nature of the non-Chinese groups discussed.
