= The Assassin (2015 film) =

2015 Taiwanese–Chinese–Hong Kong film by Hou Hsiao-hsien

- Theatrical release poster
- 刺客聂隐娘
- Directed by: Hou Hsiao-hsien
- Written by: Hou Hsiao-hsien; Chu Tʽien-wen; Hsieh Hai-Meng; Ah Cheng
- Based on: "Nie Yinniang" by Pei Xing
- Produced by: Wen-Ying Huang; Liao Ching-sung
- Starring: Shu Qi; Chang Chen; Zhou Yun; Satoshi Tsumabuki
- Cinematography: Mark Lee
- Edited by: Huang Chih-Chia
- Music by: Lim Giong
- Production companies: Central Motion Pictures; China Dream Film Culture Industry; Media Asia Films; Sil-Metropole Organisation; SpotFilms; Zhejiang Huace Film & TV
- Distributed by: Well Go USA (North America); StudioCanal (United Kingdom)
- Release dates: 21 May 2015 (Cannes); 27 August 2015 (China & Hong Kong); 28 August 2015 (Taiwan)
- Running time: 105 minutes
- Countries: Taiwan; China; Hong Kong
- Language: Mandarin
- Budget: CN¥90 million (US$14.9 million)
- Box office: CN¥61.4 million (China); US$12 million (worldwide)

The Assassin (刺客聂隐娘) is a 2015 wuxia film co-written and directed by Hou Hsiao-hsien, starring Shu Qi and Chang Chen. A Taiwanese–Chinese–Hong Kong international co-production, the film is loosely based on the ninth-century Chinese short story "Nie Yinniang" by Pei Xing, a core text in Chinese swordsmanship and wuxia fiction.

The Assassin premiered on 21 May 2015 at the Cannes Film Festival, where Hou won Best Director. It was released in China and Hong Kong on 27 August 2015, and a day later in Taiwan. It was Taiwan's entry for the Best Foreign Language Film at the 88th Academy Awards, but was not nominated. Critically acclaimed, The Assassin was named the best film of 2015 by Sight & Sound magazine. It was Hou's final film before his retirement in 2023 after it was announced that he was battling with dementia.

== Plot ==
In the 7th century China, the Tang dynasty is in decline. The imperial court seeks to protect itself by establishing garrisons at the frontiers of its empire. Two centuries later, the militarized provinces waver in their loyalty to the court. Some move to distance themselves from the emperor's control. At that time, Weibo asserts itself as the strongest of those provinces.

— Opening caption

During China's Zhenyuan era (785–805) of the mid-Tang dynasty, a few years after the An Lushan rebellion (755–763), the circuit of Weibo, though nominally a part of the Tang Empire, is de facto ruled independently by military governor Tian Ji'an.

The assassin Nie Yinniang is directed to slay corrupt government officials by her master, Jiaxin, a nun who raised her from the age of ten. When Yinniang displays mercy by failing to kill during her duties, Jiaxin punishes her with a ruthless assignment designed to test Yinniang's resolve: she is sent to the distant circuit of Weibo in northern China to kill its military governor, her cousin Tian Ji'an, to whom she was betrothed as a child.

When she arrives, Yinniang's mother, Lady Nie Tian, recounts to her that the betrothal was a consequence of Jiacheng's own marriage. Jiacheng was married off to an official of Weibo to quell unrest in Weibo, whereupon she adopted her husband's son, Tian Ji'an as her own. At her request, Tian Ji'an was betrothed to Yinniang at the age of fifteen. However, the betrothal was canceled in favor of a politically pressing marriage, and Yinniang was sent off to live with Princess Jiacheng's sister the nun Jiaxin. Yinniang wrestles with her mission to kill Tian Ji'an, especially in front of his children.

When Yinniang's uncle Tian Xing expresses views Tian Ji'an finds offensive in a meeting of state, Tian Ji'an demotes Tian Xing and sends him away to Linqing under the protection of Nie Feng, Yinniang's father. They are soon ambushed, but Yinniang arrives in time to rescue them. She accompanies the wounded survivors to a village where they meet a young mirror-polisher.

Yinniang protects Tian Ji'an on the journey where she was expected to kill him, and eventually tells Jiaxin that killing him while his sons were young would have plunged Weibo into chaos. Jiaxin dismisses Yinniang for her emotional failures after praising her unmatched martial skills. Yinniang then spares the life of the old nun before joining the traveling mirror-polisher as his guardian.

== Cast ==
- Shu Qi as Nie Yinniang, the eponymous assassin.
- Chang Chen as Tian Ji'an, Nie Yinniang's cousin and the military governor of Weibo Circuit.
- Zhou Yun as Lady Tian, Tian Ji'an's wife.
- Satoshi Tsumabuki as the mirror polisher
- Ethan Juan as Xia Jing, Tian Ji'an's bodyguard.
- Hsieh Hsin-ying as Huji, Tian Ji'an's concubine and a dancer.
- Ni Dahong as Nie Feng, Nie Yinniang's father and Tian Ji'an's provost.
- Yong Mei as Lady Nie Tian, Nie Yinniang's mother.
- Fang-Yi Sheu as Princess Jiacheng / Princess Jiaxin
- Lei Zhenyu as Tian Xing
- Jacques Picoux as Kongkong'er

== Production ==
"I haven't shot a movie in six or seven years. It's really a whole new world for me because the market is now so big, because of China. So the scale is much bigger, and that makes every detail different, so now even I have to adjust my scale."

— Hou Hsiao-hsien

The film received several subsidies from the Taiwanese government: in 2005 of NT$15 million (US$501,000), in 2008 of NT$80 million (US$2.67 million) and in 2010 of NT$20 million (US$668,000). However, over the production, Hou encountered various budget problems; thus more than half of the film's final budget came from China, a first for Hou. As of September 2012, its budget was CN¥90 million (US$14.9 million).

The film was filmed in several places in China, mainly in Hubei, Inner Mongolia and northeast China. Hou recalled that he was "blown away" when he saw "those silver birch forests and lakes: it was like being transported into a Chinese classical painting."

== Release ==
The first press conference of The Assassin since its Cannes premiere was held in Shanghai on 16 June 2015, where Hou and the film's cast discussed their Cannes experience and their upcoming promotional activities for the film.

The film premiered in Beijing on 23 August 2015, ahead of its nationwide release on 27 August 2015. For its American release, the film's distribution rights were acquired by independent distribution company Well Go USA Entertainment on 11 May 2015, and the film was released on 16 October 2015.

=== Home media ===
The Assassin was released on Blu-ray and DVD in Hong Kong on 20 December 2015. The North American release was 26 January 2016 and included four behind-the-scenes featurettes regarding the film.

== Reception ==
=== Box office ===
The film earned CN¥61.385 million at the Chinese box office. Worldwide box office is around U.S. $12 million.

=== Critical response ===
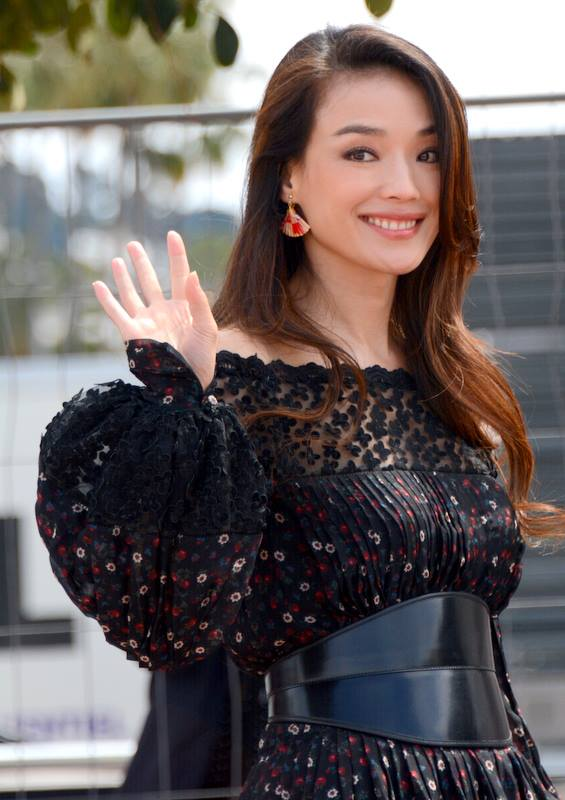
Shu Qi promoting the film at the 2015 Cannes Film Festival

The Assassin opened to critical acclaim. On review aggregator website Rotten Tomatoes, the film holds an 80% rating, based on 102 reviews, with an average rating of 7.5/10. The site's consensus states: "The Assassin's thrilling visuals mark a fresh highlight for director Hsiao-hsien Hou, even if its glacial pace may keep some viewers at arm's length." Metacritic reports an 81 out of 100 rating, based on 29 critics. Sight & Sound magazine ranked The Assassin as the best film of 2015 based on a poll of 168 critics from around the world. The Online Film Critics Society called the film the best foreign language film of 2015. It also ranked 50th in a 2016 BBC poll of the 21st century's greatest films.

New York Times co-chief film critic Manohla Dargis called the film "staggeringly lovely" at Cannes, describing it as having "held the Wednesday-night audience in rapturous silence until the closing credits, when thunderous applause and booming bravos swept through the auditorium like a wave". Variety's chief film critic Justin Chang highly praised the film, saying: "The sheer depth of its formal artistry places The Assassin in a rather more rarefied realm.... Hou implicitly grasps the expressive power of stillness and reserve, the ways in which silence can build tension and heighten interest. Above all, he never loses sight of the fact that the bodies he moves so fluidly and intuitively through space are human, and remain so even in death. ... Hou Hsiao-hsien proves himself to be not just the creator of this assassin but an unmistakably kindred spirit." On Film Business Asia, Derek Elley gave it nine out of ten, saying that "Hou Hsiao-hsien's first wuxia masterfully blends the genre's essence and his own style". Deborah Young of The Hollywood Reporter said: "Hou Hsiao-hsien brings a pure, idiosyncratic vision to the martial arts genre". Ignatiy Vishnevetsky of The A.V. Club described the "enigmatic and often mesmerizing" The Assassin as "one of the most flat-out beautiful movies of the last decade, and also one of the most puzzling". He stated: "Mood is key here...[the film is] all muted and subsumed by a poetic atmosphere that's radical even by Hou's standards... It's a movie most will be intoxicated by, but few will be able to confidently say that they understand—which may be the point, part and parcel with its conception of a world of gestures and values so absolute as to be nearly unknowable."

John Esther of UR Chicago gave the film a more mixed review, saying that "the real strength (and strain) of The Assassin is the mise-en-scène by Hou and director of photographer Mark Lee Ping Bing (In the Mood for Love; Renoir)" but was critical of the glossy depiction of the environment, saying: "The costumes, the people, the woods, the art, and the interiors are relentlessly pretty. Other than human nature, The Assassin suggests there was nothing ugly to witness during this period in time".

Sarah Cronin of the British magazine Electric Sheep wrote: "The intricacies of the story are bewildering, with the 'who' and the 'why' only obliquely revealed as the film lingers on. But rather than lending The Assassin an air of intrigue, these mysteries seem pointlessly and frustratingly obtuse, with the most potent symbolism left to be teased out of a broken piece of jade, while not enough is done to bring the characters to life, to make them whole. Hou Hsiao-hsien deliberately avoids giving its audience any of the pleasures of wuxia, but its take on the genre offers little, and feels like a pale shadow of fellow auteur Wong Kar Wai's Ashes of Time. It looks gorgeous, but there's a shallowness to its beauty. The Assassin, unfortunately, is more still life than cinema".

In his review for the Los Angeles Review of Books, Victor Fan concluded: "The Assassin is indeed like a Ming vase, beautiful — and — empty. Those who love this film can see only the vase, and those who dislike this film can see only the emptiness inside it".

=== Accolades ===
Awards
Award/Ceremony	Category	Name	Outcome
Australian Film Critics Association	Best International Film (Foreign Language)	The Assassin	Nominated
68th Cannes Film Festival	Palme d'Or	Hou Hsiao-hsien	Nominated
68th Cannes Film Festival	Best Director	Hou Hsiao-hsien	Won
68th Cannes Film Festival	Cannes Soundtrack Award	Lim Giong	Won
2015 Golden Horse Film Awards	Best Feature Film	The Assassin	Won
2015 Golden Horse Film Awards	Best Director	Hou Hsiao-hsien	Won
2015 Golden Horse Film Awards	Best Leading Actress	Shu Qi	Nominated
2015 Golden Horse Film Awards	Best Cinematography	Mark Lee Ping Bing	Won
2015 Golden Horse Film Awards	Best Makeup & Costume Design	Hwarng Wern-Ying	Won
2015 Golden Horse Film Awards	Best Sound Effects	Tu Duu-Chih, Chu Shih-Yi, Wu Shu-Yao	Won
2015 Golden Horse Film Awards	Best Adapted Screenplay	Ah Cheng, Chu T’ien-wen, Hsieh Hai-Meng	Nominated
2015 Golden Horse Film Awards	Best Art Direction	Hwarng Wern-Ying	Nominated
2015 Golden Horse Film Awards	Best Action Choreography	Liu Mingzhe	Nominated
2015 Golden Horse Film Awards	Original Music Award for Best Film	Lim Giong	Nominated
2015 Golden Horse Film Awards	Best Film Editing	Liao Ching-sung	Nominated
20th Satellite Awards	Best Foreign Language Film	The Assassin	Nominated
20th Satellite Awards	Best Costume Design	Wen-Ying Huang	Won
69th British Academy Film Awards	Best Film Not in the English Language	The Assassin	Nominated
27th Palms Springs International Film Festival	FIPRESCI Prize for Best Foreign Language Film	The Assassin	Won
10th Asian Film Awards	Best Film	The Assassin	Won
10th Asian Film Awards	Best Director	Hou Hsiao-hsien	Won
10th Asian Film Awards	Best actress	Shu Qi	Won
10th Asian Film Awards	Best supporting actress	Zhou Yun	Won
10th Asian Film Awards	Best cinematography	Mark Lee Ping-bing	Won
10th Asian Film Awards	Best original music	Lim Giong	Won
10th Asian Film Awards	Best costume design	Hwarng Wern-ying	Nominated
10th Asian Film Awards	Best production design	Hwarng Wern-ying	Won
10th Asian Film Awards	Best sound	Chu Shih-yi, Tu Duu-chih, Wu Shu-yao	Won
9th Asia Pacific Screen Awards	Achievement in Cinematography	Mark Lee Ping-bing	Won

== See also ==
- List of submissions to the 88th Academy Awards for Best Foreign Language Film
- List of Taiwanese submissions for the Academy Award for Best Foreign Language Film
