= Go! Go! G-Boys =

2006 Taiwanese film by Yu Jong-jong

- Directed by: Yu Jongjong
- Screenplay by: Lee Tayi; Changlee Shimolo
- Produced by: Chester Chen; Wei Chunghuang
- Starring: Sattawat Sethakorn; Zheng Gangtang; Yu Fayang; Chen Aoliang; Tang Guojung; Lai Tzyi; Peng Poshao; Juang Shinfu; Josephine Blankstein; Teddy Wang; Renzo Liu
- Music by: George Chen; Hung Tzeli
- Production companies: Times Entertainment; Ski Digi Entertainment
- Distributed by: Ski Digi Entertainment
- Release date: 6 September 2006 (Taiwan)
- Running time: 120 minutes
- Country: Taiwan
- Language: Mandarin

Go! Go! G-Boys (Chinese: 當我們同在一起; pinyin: Dāng Wǒmen Tóng Zài Yīqǐ) is a 2006 Taiwanese comedy film directed by Yu Jongjong. The film stars Sattawat Sethakorn as A-Hong, Zheng Gangtang as A-Shing and Yu Fayang as Jay. It was released on September 6, 2006.

== Plot ==
The G-Boys is a male beauty contest held annually in the city of Taipei for gay men, with a main prize of US$10 million. Among the participants is A-Hong, whose selfish and wasteful girlfriend accumulates a large debt that he is forced to pay. Looking for a way to make money, A-Hong decides to enter the G-Boys contest despite not being gay, while being joined by his best friend A-Shing (Zheng Gangtang). A-Shing dreams of becoming a rock star and has been secretly in love with A-Hong since childhood; thus seeing the contest as a possibility of becoming more than friends. However, the contest is under a series of death threats that has alerted the police. Jay, a somewhat homophobic detective and an enthusiastic fan of action movies, is sent to infiltrate in the contest and discover the culprit.

== Cast ==
- Sattawat Sethakorn as A-Hong
- Zheng Gangtang as A-Shing
- Yu Fayang as Jay
- Chen Aoliang as Young Long
- Tang Guojung as Daniel
- Lai Tzyi como Kitamura
- Peng Poshao as Siao Shi
- Juang Shinfu as Alex
- Josephine Blankstein as Risa
- Teddy Wang as Terrorist
- Renzo Liu as Contest organizer
