= Kunlun Nu =

Wuxia romance written by Pei Xing

Woodblock print of the Kunlun slave Mole (left) and his master Cui (right) from the 17th century.

Kunlun Nu (Chinese: 崑崙奴, "The Kunlun Slave" or "The Negrito Slave") is a wuxia romance written by Pei Xing (裴铏, 825–880) during the Tang dynasty. The hero of the tale is a Negrito slave who uses his extraordinary physical abilities to save his master's lover from a court official's harem.

== Plot ==
It takes place during the Dali reign era (766-80) of Emperor Daizong of Tang and follows the tale of a young man named Cui who enlists the aid of Mole, his negrito slave, to help free his beloved who was forced to join a court official's harem. At midnight, Mole kills the guard dogs around the compound and carries Cui on his back while easily jumping to the tops of walls and bounding from roof to roof. With the lovers reunited, Mole leaps over ten tall walls with both of them on his back. Cui and his beloved are able to live happily together in peace because the official believes that she was kidnapped by youxia warriors and does not want to make trouble for himself by pursuing them. However, two years later, one of the official's attendants sees the girl in the city and reports this. The official arrests Cui and, once he hears the entire story, sends men to capture the negrito slave. But Mole escapes with his dagger (apparently his only possession) and flies over the city walls in order to escape apprehension. He is seen over ten years later selling medicine in the city Luoyang, not having aged a single day.

== Daoist influence ==
Mole's gravity defying abilities and agelessness suggests the fictional character is a practitioner of esoteric life-prolonging exercises akin to xian, or immortals. According to a tale attributed to the Daoist adept Ge Hong, some hunters in the Zhongnan Mountains saw a naked man whose body was covered in black hair. Whenever they tried to capture him he “leapt over gullies and valleys as if in flight, and so could not be overtaken." After finally ambushing the man, the hunters learned it was in fact a 200 plus year old woman who had learned the arts of immortality from an old man in the forest. Still, it was popular in folktales for immortals to sell medicine in the city, just like Mole does. The hagiography of the immortal Hu Gong (Sire Gourd) says he sold medicine in the market place during the day and slept in a magic gourd hanging in his stall at night.

=== How the Kunlun Slave Became an Immortal ===
The late Ming dynasty bibliographer and playwright Mei Dingzuo (梅鼎祚, 1549–1615) wrote a play entitled "How the Kunlun Slave Became an Immortal" (昆仑奴剑侠成仙). The play expands upon the story in several ways. For instance, Mole explains to Cui that despite his wonderful abilities, he "is a slave because of an obligation from a past life." During the ten year interval between his escape and when he is spotted selling medicine in the market place, Mole cultivates immortality through Daoist practices and befriends many immortals. A woodblock print of the play appearing in Assorted Plays from the High Ming (盛明雜劇, 1629) portrays Mole as a large-framed man with characteristic features such as a thick beard and foreign dress.

== Other media ==
=== Film ===
- The Promise (2005). This is a very loose film adaptation of The Kunlun Slave. Instead of being called Mo Le, the slave is simply called “Kunlun” and he is portrayed by Korean actor Jang Dong-gun.
- Kunlun Nu Yedao Hongxiao (昆仑奴夜盗红绡, "The Kunlun Slave Steals Hung-siu by Night") (1956).

== See also ==
- Negrito
- Magical Negro
- Noble savage
- K'un-lun po
