= He Zhuoyan =

Chinese actress and singer (born 1988)

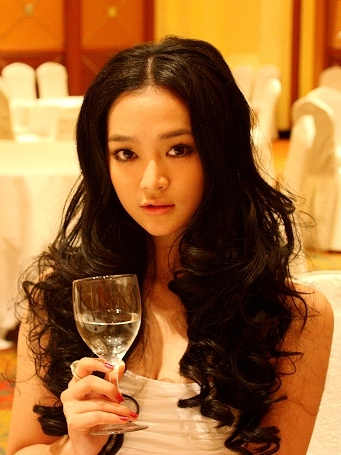
- He at a Huayi Brothers party in 2009
- Born: 26 November 1988 (age 37); Hangzhou, Zhejiang
- Occupations: Actress; singer
- Years active: 2005–present
- Awards: Celebrity with the Most Potential Award, Forbes China Celebrity 100 (2007); Best Couple on TV Award, SINA TV Awards (2008)

Chinese name
- Chinese: 何琢言
Transcriptions
Standard Mandarin
- Hanyu Pinyin: Hé Zhuóyán
Yue: Cantonese
- Jyutping: Ho4 Doek3-jin4
- Musical career
- Label: Huayi Brothers
- Website: http://blog.sina.cn/dpool/blog/hezhuoyan

He Zhuoyan (born 26 November 1988) is a Chinese actress and singer. In 2007, she became the youngest person to obtain an award in the Forbes China Celebrity 100, winning the Celebrity with the Most Potential Award at the age of 18.

== Filmography ==
=== Film ===
Year	Title	Role	Notes
2010	Hot Summer Days 全城热恋	Xiaoli	guest star
2014	Fiji Love 斐济99℃爱情		

=== Television ===
Year	Title	Role	Notes
2008	Royal Tramp 鹿鼎记	Shuang'er	
2008	Paladins in Troubled Times 大唐游侠传	Wang Yanyu	
2008	Bing Sheng 兵圣	Guo Moli	
2009	The Heaven Sword and Dragon Saber 倚天屠龙记	Xiaozhao	
2009	Nonstop 青春进行时	He Zhuoyan	
2010	Salvation Woman Soldier Hui Situ 拯救女兵司徒慧	Situ Hui	
2011	Journey to the West 西游记	Albino rat	
2012	Xing Ming Shi Ye 刑名师爷	Xia Fengyi	
2013	Journey of the Fortune God 财神有道	Orchid Fairy	

== Stage performances ==
Year	Title	Role	Notes
2010	Shouwang Mengxiang 守望梦想	Female lead	performed at the Red Star Theatre inside the Redstar Culture Hotel in Hangzhou
2012	Mancheng Quanshi Jinzita 满城全是金字塔		performed at the Zhejiang Mass Art Theatre in Hangzhou

== Discography ==
Performances in Super Girl competition
Song title	Chinese title	Original artist
Yumao (Feather)	羽毛	Cyndi Wang
Dang Ni (When You)	当你	Cyndi Wang
Ai Ni (Love You)	爱你	Cyndi Wang
Aiqing Jiayou (Cheer on for Love)	爱情加油	Cyndi Wang
Tian Heihei (Dark Sky)	天黑黑	Stefanie Sun
Yujian (Meeting)	遇见	Stefanie Sun
Lü Guang (Green Light)	绿光	Stefanie Sun
Ouruola (Aurora)	欧若拉	Angela Chang
Shouxin De Taiyang (The Sun in My Palm)	手心的太阳	Angela Chang
Remember		S.H.E
Meili Xin Shijie (Beautiful New World)	美丽新世界	S.H.E
Yes I Love You		S.H.E
Huizhe Chibang De Nühai (The Girl Flapping Her Wings)	挥着翅膀的女孩	Joey Yung
Ni Yao De Ai (The Love You Want)	你要的爱	Penny Tai
Xiang Jia (Homesick)	想家	Genie Chuo
Qi Shi Jing Shen (Spirit of the Knight)	骑士精神	Jolin Tsai
Jia Sudu (Increase Speed)	加速度	Huo Ying
Xiaodingdang (Doraemon)	小叮当	Mavis Fan
Fenshou Kuaile (Happy Separation)	分手快乐	Fish Leong
Duoxie Shilian (Thank You for Breaking Up)	多谢失恋	Twins

Singles and others
Year	Song title	Chinese title	Notes
2005	Daoshu Sanmiao Shuo Aini (Countdown Three Seconds, Say I Love You)	倒数三秒说爱你	original
2007	Guangrong (Pride)	光荣	performed with BoBo

== Awards ==
List of awards and nominations
Year	Award	Notes
2007	Celebrity with the Most Potential Award, Forbes China Celebrity 100 福布斯"最具潜力名人"奖	
2008	Best Couple on TV Award, SINA TV Awards 新浪电视剧第二季度评选"最佳荧屏情侣"奖	Won together with co-stars Huang Xiaoming, Cherrie Ying, Shu Chang, Hu Ke, Liu Zi, Liu Yun and Li Fei in Royal Tramp
2008	Most Popular Newcomer Award, Juwu Haixi Niuxing Tianxia "剧舞海西·牛行天下"之"最受观众喜欢新人"奖	
