= Victor Huang =

Taiwanese actor and singer

- 黃維德
- Born: Huang Wei-de; 21 October 1971 (age 53); Taipei, Taiwan
- Occupation(s): Actor, singer
- Years active: 1993-present

Chinese name
- Traditional Chinese: 黃維德
- Simplified Chinese: 黄维德
Transcriptions
Standard Mandarin
- Hanyu Pinyin: Huáng Wéidé
Southern Min
- Hokkien POJ: N̂g Î-tek
- Musical career
- Labels: Asia Entertainment Group

Victor Huang Wei-de (Chinese: 黃維德; Pe̍h-ōe-jī: N̂g Î-tek, born 21 October 1971) is a Taiwanese actor and singer.

== Biography ==
Huang started his career as a singer. In 2000 he joined Phoenix Talent Company (鳳凰藝能) and acted in many television dramas produced by Chinese Television System and Formosa Television. In late 2004, Huang starred as the male lead character Kong Lifu in Moment in Peking, a Chinese television series based on Lin Yutang's novel of the same title. In 2006 Huang became an artist under Chinese talent agency Huayi Brothers.

== Filmography ==
=== Film ===
Year	Title	Role	Notes
1993	The Street Car Named Desire 日落卡门		
1996	Horror Net 网上鬼妻		
2000	Romantic Storm 小鼠爱大米		
2000	Accusation of the Wall 月夜闪灵		
2001	The Last Salute 报告总司令	Pte. Wong Wai-tak	
2001	Crying Sky 哭泣的天空		
2010	Love Island 热爱岛		
2011	The Devil Inside Me 夺命心跳		
2011	The Lion Roars 2 河东狮吼2		
2011	Nightmare 午夜凶梦		
2012	Truth or Dare 真心话大冒险		
2016	Rookie Chef		
2019	Justice Bao		

=== Television ===
Year	Title	Role	Notes
2000	Princess Huai-yu 怀玉公主	Cheng An	
2000	Dragon in the Sky 飞龙在天	Xie Youhuang	
2001	Caizi Jiaren Qianlong Huang 才子佳人乾隆皇	Fuheng	
2001	Jinzhi Yuye 金枝玉叶	Lin Jiasheng	
2001	Yanyu Jiangnan 烟雨江南	Kangxi Emperor	
2002	Ting Ben Jinyu Changge 听笨金鱼唱歌	Li Yuanzhe	
2002	Life Road 世间路	Fang Shijie	
2003	Ching-lung 青龙好汉	Li Qinglong	
2003	A Chinese Ghost Story 倩女幽魂	Wang Jiang	
2004	Love Bird 候鸟e人	Xie Youda	
2004	Yuwang Rensheng 欲望人生	Wu Congda	
2004	Amor de Tarapaca 紫藤恋	Li Jie	
2004	Moment in Peking 京华烟云	Kong Lifu	
2005	Shaonian Jiaqing 少年嘉庆	Yongyan	
2005	Concubines of the Qing Emperor 大清后宫	An Xuechen	
2005	New Become 新昨夜星辰	Qiu Weihao	
2006	Super Mates 超级男女	Mo Wenhu	
2006	Jianghu Wangshi 江湖往事	Gao Tianxiong	
2007	Paladins in Troubled Times 大唐游侠传	Tie Mole	
2007	The Legend and the Hero 2 封神榜之武王伐纣	King Wu of Zhou	
2007	The Young Lawyer Ji Xiaolan 少年讼师纪晓岚	Ji Xiaolan	
2008	The Queens 母仪天下	Xiao Yu	
2008	Archrivals 对手	Huang Yongqing	
2009	4th Army Women Soldiers 新四军女兵	Ma Jingping	
2009	Meteor, Butterfly, Sword 新流星蝴蝶剑	Lü Xiangchuan	
2010	3S Lady 单身女王	Xue Can	
2010	Three Kingdoms 三国	Zhou Yu	
2011	Camellia 山茶花	Xia Tian	
2011	Grand Gold Vein 大金脉	Guo Lin	
2015	Nirvana in Fire 琅琊榜	Xiao Jinghuan	

== Discography ==
=== Albums ===
Release date	Title	Label	Notes
December 1992	Re Ai 热爱	BMG	
March 1996	Aiqing Niao 爱情鸟	磙石唱片	
February 2001	Caizi Jiaren Qianlong Huang Original Soundtrack 才子佳人乾隆皇原声带	大信唱片	
October 2003	Hao MAN 好MAN	动能音乐	
