= Old Man Zhu =

Chinese short story

- Short story by Pu Songling
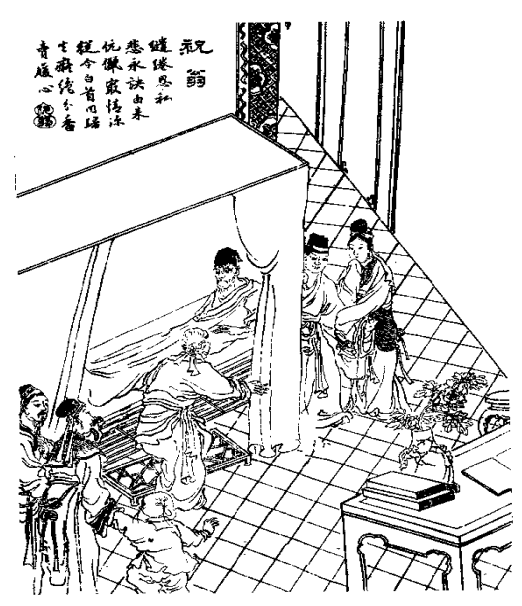
- 19th-century illustration from Xiangzhu liaozhai zhiyi tuyong (Liaozhai Zhiyi with commentary and illustrations; 1886)
- Original title: 祝翁 (Zhu weng)
- Country: China
- Language: Chinese
- Genres: Zhiguai; Chuanqi; Short story

Publication
- Published in: Strange Tales from a Chinese Studio
- Publication date: 1740

Chronology
Fourth Sister Hu (胡四姐)	The Swordswoman (俠女)

"Old Man Zhu" (Chinese: 祝翁; pinyin: Zhù wēng) is a short story by Pu Songling, first published in Strange Tales from a Chinese Studio (1740). It revolves around the titular gentleman who returns from the dead to fetch his wife.

== Plot ==
The patriarch of the Zhu family in Jiyang dies at the age of 50 but comes back to life shortly after, apparently because he had regretted leaving his wife behind. With the rest of the family gathered around the couple, he instructs her to lie down on the bed together with him; Zhu's family soon discovers that the bodies on the bed have become corpses.

== Publication history ==
Originally titled "Zhu weng" (祝翁), "Old Man Zhu" was written by Pu Songling probably in or before 1682 when he was around 40 years old and first published in his 18th-century anthology Liaozhai zhiyi or Strange Tales from a Chinese Studio. It was fully translated into Bahasa Melayu (albeit under the "confusing" title of "Tjiok Seng" or "Scholar Zhu") in 1895 by Jo Tjin Goan as part of Boekoe Boelanan, a limited anthology of Liaozhai zhiyi stories published in Batavia. A French translation was written by Pierre Daudin in 1938 with the assistance of "two Chinese scholars and a Vietnamese collator". The French translation of "Zhu weng" was first included in the thirteenth volume of Bulletin des Etudes Indochinoises and subsequently in a 1940 Saigon publication titled Cinquantes contes chinois extraits du Leao-tchai Tche-yi. The story was fully translated into English as "Dying Together" in John Minford's Strange Tales from a Chinese Studio (2006) and as "Old Man Zhu" in the first volume of Sidney L. Sondergard's Strange Tales from Liaozhai published in 2008.

== Literary analysis ==
"Old Man Zhu" is presented by an implicit narrator; according to Pu's postscript, the story was relayed to him by "a daughter-in-law of Zhu's younger brother who ... was one of the younger women who was giggling at the spectacle of her in-laws publicly in bed together." The implicit narrator of "Old Man Zhu" was reportedly also a maidservant at the residence of Bi Jiyou (畢際有), where Pu Songling stayed for "many years".
