= Nanfang Caomu Zhuang =

Nanfang caomu zhuang

Chinese name
- Traditional Chinese: 南方草木狀
- Simplified Chinese: 南方草木状
- Literal meaning: southern region plants [and] trees account
Transcriptions
Standard Mandarin
- Hanyu Pinyin: Nánfāng cǎomù zhuàng
- Wade–Giles: Nan-fang ts'ao-mu chuang
Yue: Cantonese
- Jyutping: Naam4 fong1 cou2 muk6 zong6
Southern Min
- Hokkien POJ: Lâm-hong chháu-bo̍k chōng
Middle Chinese
- Middle Chinese: Nom pjang tshawX muwk
Old Chinese
- Baxter–Sagart (2014): Nˤ[əə]m C-paŋ [tsʰ]ˤuʔ C.mˤok

Korean name
- Hangul: 남방초목상
- Hanja: 南方草木狀
Transcriptions
- Revised Romanization: Nambang chomok sang
- McCune–Reischauer: Nambang ch'omok sang

Japanese name
- Kanji: 南方草木狀
- Hiragana: なんぽうくさきじょう
Transcriptions
- Revised Hepburn: Nanpō kusaki jō

Nanfang caomu zhuang title page, 1726 Japanese edition

The (c. 304 CE) Nanfang caomu zhuang (南方草木狀 Plants of the Southern Regions), attributed to the Western Jin dynasty scholar and botanist Ji Han (嵇含, 263-307), is a Flora describing the plants of Nanyue and Jiaozhi, present-day South China and northern Vietnam. The Nanfang caomu zhuang is the oldest work extant in any language on subtropical botany. The book contains the first descriptions of several economic plants, for instance jasmine and black pepper, as well as the earliest accounts of some agricultural techniques such as biological pest control (using "citrus ants" to protect orange crops), and the cultivation of vegetables on floating gardens (centuries before the earliest recorded Mesoamerican chinampa).

Since 1273, when the Nanfang caomu zhuang was first printed in the Song dynasty, it was frequently quoted by Chinese authors, both in literature and technical books on horticulture, agriculture, and Chinese herbology. Since the 19th century (e.g., Hirth and Bretschneider, many Western sinologists, botanists, and historians of plant cultivation have studied it.

== Ji Han ==
The Nanfang caomu zhuang author Ji Han was "one of the greatest of all Chinese botanists".

The primary source of information about Ji Han's life is the Book of Jin biography of his uncle Ji Shao, who was the son of the poet-musician Ji Kang (223–262), one of the Seven Worthies of the Bamboo Grove. Ji Han was born in 263 in Zhixian (銍縣, in present-day Anhui province). His courtesy name was Jun Dao (君道; "Gentleman's Way"), and his pen name Boqiuzi (亳丘子 "Master of Boqiu") refers to his residence at Boqiu (present-day Henan) near the capital Luoyang. He served as a scholar-administrator and poet on the staff of several princes.

In 300, during the War of the Eight Princes, Ji Han was a military commander under the future Emperor Huai of Jin (r. 307-313), whose army suffered a defeat at Dangyin (蕩陰), in which his uncle Ji Shao was killed protecting the emperor. Ji Han was made prefect of Xiangcheng in 304, but when it was conquered, he had to escape south to Xiangyang (present-day Hebei), and at the recommendation of the official Liu Hong, he was appointed governor of Guangdong in 306. However, before he could leave, Ji Han was assassinated at Xiangyang in 307 after Liu Hong's death. When Ji Han was made Governor, he appointed his friend Ge Hong, the alchemist and author of the Shenxian zhuan and Baopuzi, as aide-de-camp. Ge Hong went to Guangdong ahead of Ji, and remained there afterwards for several years, probably because he was interested in the exotic plants and unusual mineral substances of the south.

In addition to writing the Nanfang caomu zhuang, the "first botanical treatise of all time", Ji Han was a prolific poet, particularly fu "rhapsody; poetic exposition", and deeply interested in botany. While most of his ten-volume collected works were lost, later texts quote the prefaces to Ji's poetical fu essays on the daylily, hibiscus, Platycarya tree, evergreen tree, and sweet melon. Ji Han also wrote a fu on the fashionable "Cold-Food Powder" mixture of mineral and plant drugs, which says "it cured his ailing son when other treatments had failed".

== Title ==
The title uses three common Chinese words.

- Nánfāng (南方, lit. "south direction/region") "south; southern part of a country"
- Cǎomù (草木, lit. grass/herb [and] tree") "vegetation; plants (in general)"
- Zhuàng (狀) "form, shape; state, condition; account, record; description, narrative"

The title Nanfang caomu zhuang does not have a standard English translation. For instance, the Science and Civilisation in China series of books, edited by Joseph Needham and his international collaborators, gives six variant versions.

- "Plants and Trees of the Southern Regions"
- "Records of the Plants and Trees of the Southern Regions"
- "Prospect of the Plants and Trees of the Southern Regions"
- "Appearances of Plants and Trees in the Southern Regions"
- "Herbs and Trees of the South"
- "Flora of the South"

== Content ==
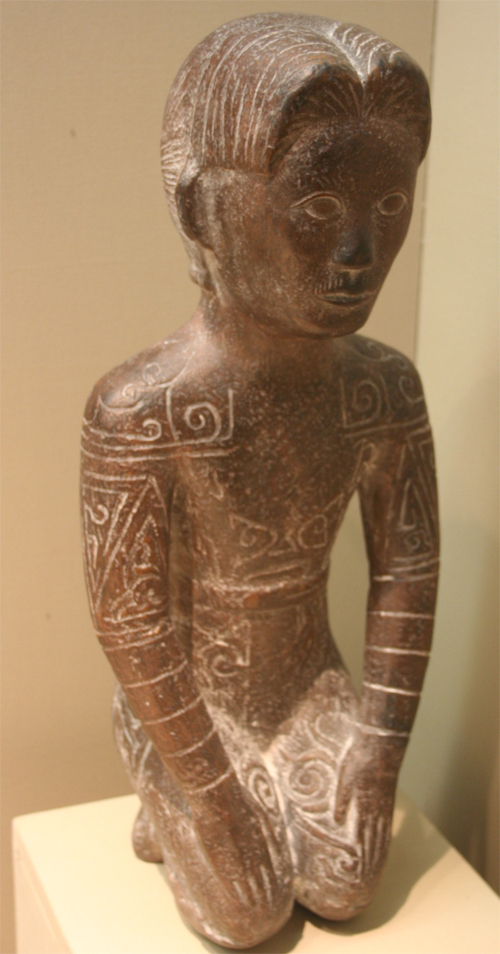
Statue of a tattooed man from Yue state, Zhejiang Provincial Museum

The Nanfang caomu zhuang text is divided into three chapters, with a total of 80 botanical entries. The first (cǎolèi 草類 "Herbs", 1-29) consists of 29 herbs and plants, the second (mùlèi 木類 "Trees", 30-57) 28 forest trees, and the third consists of (guǒlèi 果類 "Fruits", 58-74) 17 fruit trees, and (zhúlèi 竹類 "Bamboos", 75-80) 6 bamboos.

The Preface explains Ji Han's motive in writing the book.

The plants of Nan-yueh and Chiao-chih are the most interesting of the four borderlands. They were not known before the Chou and Ch'in dynasties. Since the expansion territories undertaken by Wu Ti of Han, the rare and precious kinds were sought and brought in and the best were used as tributes. As people of the central regions are often unfamiliar with their nature, I hereby record and describe these from what I have heard for the benefit of future generations.

The ancient kingdom of Nanyue ("southern Yue") was located in parts of the present-day Chinese provinces of Guangdong, Guangxi, and Yunnan; Jiaozhi was in northern Vietnam. The pre-Han dynasties were the Zhou (c. 1046–256 BCE) and Qin (221–206 BCE). Emperor Wu of Han (r. 141–87 BCE) led the Southward expansion of the Han dynasty.

Among six proposed categories of Chinese authors who wrote botanical books, Ji Han and the exotic botanical Nanfang caomu zhuiang exemplify the first, "scholar-officials, physicians and others whose duties took them to those places within or on the borders of the empire where special plants flourished".

== Genre ==
The Nanfang caomu zhuang is considered the type-specimen for the "strange plants of the south" genre of Chinese botanical writings. Within the traditional Sinocentric world-view, China's "south" (nan 南) referred to the seaward-facing regions of present-day Zhejiang, Fujian, Guangdong, Guangxi, and Hainan provinces, all subtropical or tropical in climate are distinctly separate from the rest of China, which is borne out by their affiliation to a different floristic region. The Nan Mountains or Wuling (五岭 "five mountain ranges") geographically and climatically separate Northern and Southern China, and Lingnan ("south of the mountain ranges") is another name for the subtropical area that Ji Han called Nanyue and Jiaozhi.

The first book in the "strange plants of the south" genre was the (early 3rd century) Yiwu zhi ("Record of Strange/Foreign Things"), by the Eastern Han official Yang Fu. It is also known as the Nanyi yiwu zhi (南裔異物志, "Record of Strange Things of the Southern Borders").

The (c. 3rd century) Nanzhou yiwu zhi (南洲異物志, "Record of Strange Things of the Southern Continent") or Nanfang yiwu zhi (南方異物志, "Record of Strange Things of the South") was written by Wan Zhen (萬震), and may have been one of Ji Han's sources for his book.

Ji Han's Nanfang caomu zhi ("Record of Southern Plants and Trees") title is sometimes confused with the (c. 3rd-4th century) Nanfang caowu zhi (南方草物狀, "Record of Southern Plants and Products"), which was written by a less well-known person, whose name is written Xu Zhong (徐衷) or Xu Biao (徐表). In order to explain the confusion of these caomu ("plants and trees") and caowu ("plants and products") titles, Needham, Lu, and Huang compare this almost-identically named parallel work with noise in communication systems. For instance, an early Chinese book on agriculture, Jia Sixie's (賈思勰, c. 540) Qimin Yaoshu was fond of quoting the Nanfang caowu zhi, as were others later, often giving Nanfang caomu zhi as the title. But since none of the Xu Zhong quotations can be found in the work of Ji Han as it has come down to us, some scholars supposed the two books to have been one and the same. Modern scholarship has shown that the two books were quite distinct. In contrast to Ji Han's "refinement", Xu Zhong's style is "plain and rather repetitive". There are five cases of the same plant being described by both authors, and then the entries are generally quite different; but the Nanfang caowu zhi was never a flora, for it included marine animals and all kinds of natural products.

The (early 19th century) Xu nanfang caomu zhi (續南方草木狀 "Supplement to the Record of Southern Plants and Trees"), written by Jiang Fan (江藩), is an independent study rather than a supplement to Ji Han's book. It contains brief notes on 42 plants in Guangdong.

== Sample entries ==
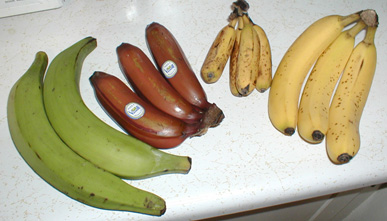
Left to right: plantains, Red, Latundan, and Cavendish bananas.

The best way to elucidate the Nanfang caomu zhuang text is to provide some noteworthy entries for bananas, Chinese spinach, oranges, and "herb ferment".

=== Banana ===
The Gānjiāo (甘蕉, lit. "sweet banana/plantain") "banana, Musa paradisiaca, Musa sapientum" entry distinguishes two kinds of dessert-banana plants and one fiber-banana plant.

The Kan-chiao, seen from afar, resembles a tree. The larger plants are over one armspan in circumference. The leaves are ten feet long, or sometimes seven to eight feet and over one to almost two feet broad. The flowers are as big as a wine cup, with the shape and color of a lotus. Over one hundred pods are attached together at the end of the stem, called a fang (房, spathe). They are sweet and palatable and can also be preserved in honey. The roots resemble taro, the largest as big as a carriage wheel. Fruiting follows flowering, and the flowers, which have a cluster of six pods each, develop successively. The pods are not formed simultaneously and the flowers do not drop at the same time. It is also called Pa-chiao 芭蕉 or Pa-chü 巴苴. Removing the peel of the pod, the yellowish-white interior with a taste like the grape appears, sweet and soft. It satisfies hunger also. There are three kinds. The kind with pods the size of a thumb, long and pointed, resembling a sheep's horn in shape, is called Yang-chiao-chiao 羊角蕉 (sheep's horn banana), and is the sweetest and most delicious in taste. Another kind with pods the size of a hen's egg and resembling a cow's udder is called Niu-ju-chiao 牛乳蕉 (cow's udder banana), and is slightly inferior to Yang-chiao-chiao. A third kind is the size of a lotus rootstock; the pods are six to seven inches in length, squarish in shape, not sweet, and considered the most inferior. The stem is separable into fibers, and when treated with lime, can be woven into thin cloth, called Chiao-ko 蕉葛 (banana linen). Although the cloth is soft and good and yellowish-white in color, it is not comparable to the reddish linen. The plant grows in both Chiao and Kuang. According to the San-fu huang-t'u 三輔黃圖, "Wu Ti of Han, in the sixth year of the Yüan-ting period (111 B.C.), conquered Nan-yüeh and built the Fu-Ii Palace to plant the rare plants and strange trees obtained. There are two plants Kan-chiao." (1)

This detailed description is of great interest for botanists, but closer observation would have shown that the six fruits in a half-spiral did not come from one ovary. Since banana plants are all sterile hybrid cultigens, species differentiation is problematic. Musa × paradisiaca includes the previously differentiated M. paradisiaca "cooking/fiber banana; plantain" and M. sapientum " dessert banana". Judging from the Nanfang caomu zhuang account, the two yángjiǎojiāo (羊角蕉 "ram's horn banana") and niúrǔjiāo (牛乳蕉 "cow's milk banana") were of the edible sapientum type, and the unnamed third was of the fibrous paradisiaca type. Xiāngjiāo (香蕉 "fragrant banana") is the common name in Modern Standard Chinese usage.

The most surprising thing is the emphasis placed on the banana as a fiber plant, and the oldest occurrences of the word jiao mention no fruit, but only the value of the fiber and the cloth. The (121 CE) Shuowen jiezi first recorded the Chinese character jiāo (蕉 "plantain; banana"), which combines the "plant radical" (艸) and a jiāo (焦 "burnt; scorched") phonetic, defined as (生枲, lit. "living/raw male hemp-nettle") translated "raw plant fiber" or "natural nettle-hemp". Zuo Si's (c. 270) "Wudu fu" (吳都賦 "Rhapsody on the Wu capital", i.e., Suzhou) mentions jiāogé (蕉葛 "linen made from banana/plantain fibers") but not the fruit. Needham, Lu, and Huang say that the banana was primarily a textile-producer, rather than cultivated for fruit, which could reasonably explain the origin of the name, for jiāo (焦) means "heat; burning; boiling", which was how the stems had to be treated with lime water to get the fibers.

This entry quotes the Sanfu huangtu (三輔黃圖 "Description of palace buildings in [the Han capital] Chang'an"), which is an anonymous text of uncertain date, estimated at from the 3rd century to the 8th century, says:

In the sixth year of Yüan-ting [i.e., 111 B. C.] of the reign of Emperor Wu of the Han Dynasty, Annam was vanquished. The palace Fu-li kung 扶荔宮 [so named on account of its lichee plants] was built [in Ch'ang-an, the national capital] for transplanting the newly acquired plants ... among which were ... twelve plants of the kan-chiao, etc. ... Because the climates of the North and the South are different, most of the plants soon died.

Parts of this Nanfang caomu zhuang banana entry are almost identical with passages in earlier and later texts. The Nanfang caomu zhuang source could have been the (2nd-3rd century) Yiwu zhi or (3rd century) Nanzhou yiwu zhi; and it could have been copied into the (3rd-4th century) Nanfang caowu zhi and (4th-5th century) Guang zhi (廣志). Yang Fu's Yiwu zhi gives this description.

Pa-chiao has leaves as large as mats. Its stem is like a [bamboo] shoot. After boiling, the stem breaks into fibres and can be used for weaving cloth. Women weavers make this fibre into fine or coarse linen which is known now as chiao-chih [Cochin-China] linen. The center of the plant is shaped like a garlic-bulb and is as large as a plate[?]. There the fruit grows and holds the 'stem.' One stem bears several tens of fruits. The fruit has a reddish skin like the color of fire and when peeled the inside pulp is dark. The pulp is edible and is very sweet, like sugar or honey. Four or five of these fruits are enough for a meal. After eating, the flavor lingers on among the teeth. Kan-chiao is another name for it.

The Nanfang caomu zhuang has another entry (9) for an unidentified shuijiao (水蕉 "water banana") that "resembles the day-lily, and is either purple or yellow", which Li suggests might be Lycoris.

=== Chinese spinach ===
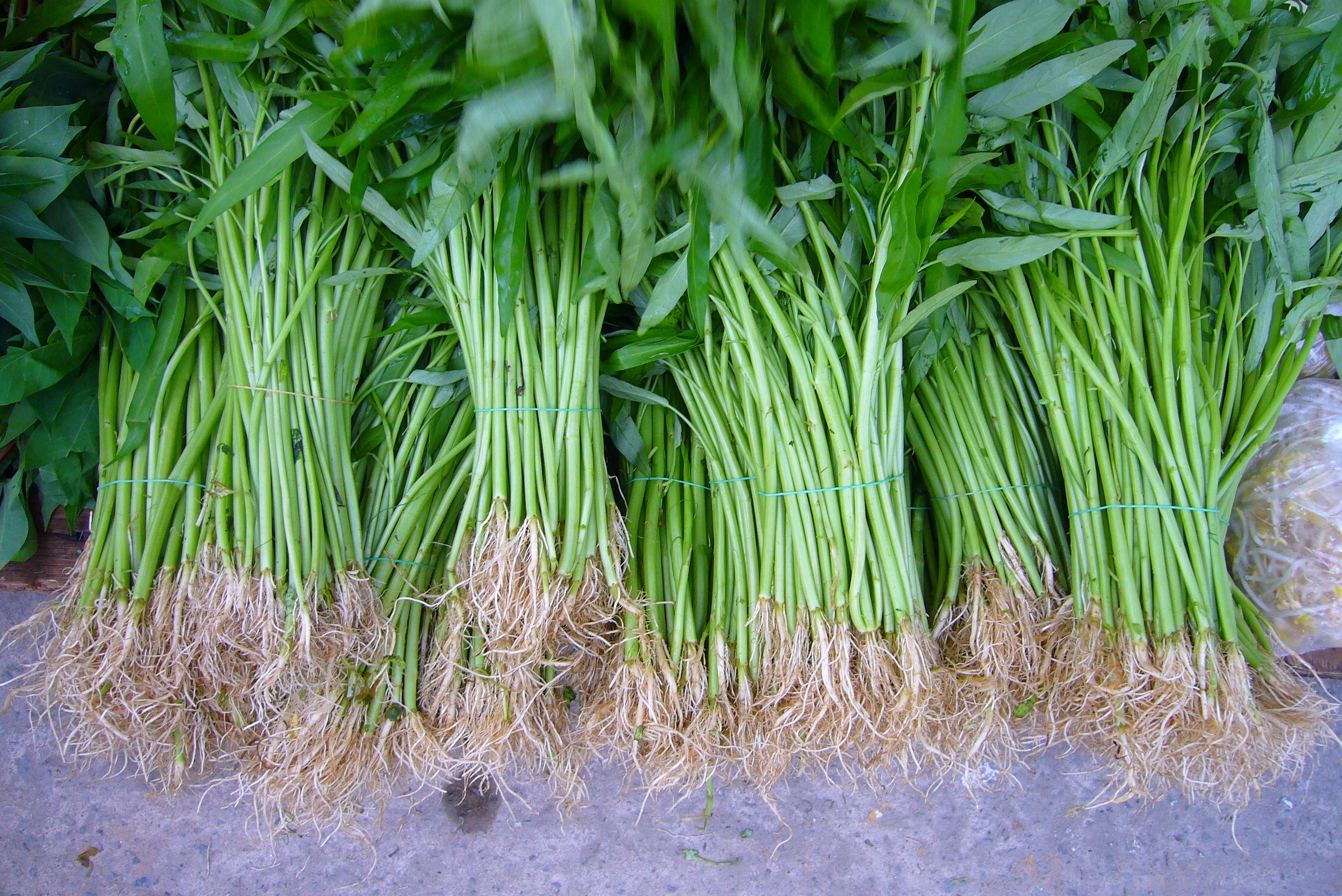
Ipomoea aquatica water spinach

The Nanfangcao mu zhuang entry for yongcai (蕹葉 "Ipomoea aquatica; Chinese spinach; water spinach; swamp cabbage") is the first record of both this vegetable and of floating gardens.

Chinese spinach is a semi-aquatic tropical plant grown, either in water or on wet ground, as a vegetable for its tender shoots and leaves. In southern China it is a very common and popular vegetable, and often escapes from cultivation.

The Yung has leaves resembling the Lo-k'uei 落葵 but smaller in size. The nature is cold and the taste sweet. The southerners make rafts by weaving reeds, cutting into the raft small holes and floating it above the water. When seeds are planted in the water, they float above the water like duckweeds. When grown, the stems and leaves rise above the holes in the raft, which undulates with the water. This is a strange vegetable of the south. Yeh-ko 冶葛 has deadly poison. If juice of the Yung is dropped on the shoot of the latter, it withers instantly. According to traditions, Wei-wu 魏武 could eat Yeh-ko up to one foot in length. It is said that this is possible because he ate the vegetable first. (25)

Wei Wu (魏武 "[Emperor] Wu of Wei") is the posthumous name of Cao Cao (155-220), the penultimate Chancellor of the Eastern Han dynasty and founder of the Cao Wei dynasty (220-265). These plant references are luòkuí (落葵 lit. "falling malva") Basella alba or redvine spinach and yěgé (冶葛 lit. "smelting kudzu") Gelsemium elegans or heartbreak grass. Gelsemium is the subsequent Nanfang caomu zhuang entry (26), which says, "Those who use this to poison people often give it mixed with other raw vegetables. If not discovered quickly and treated with an antidote, the one poisoned will die within half a day." Gelsemium roots contain the highly toxic alkaloid gelsemine, which acts as a paralytic and often results in death. Later Chinese works repeatedly mention using Chinese spinach as an antidote for Gelsemium, and in India, the juice of this plant is believed to have emetic properties and is used in opium poisoning.

Chinese floating gardens are called fēngtián (葑田 "wild-rice fields") or jiàtián (架田 "frame fields"). Many texts, such as Xu Guangqi's (1693) Nongzheng chuanshu (農政全書 "Complete Treatise on Agricultural Administration"), refer to floating gardens. Wang Zhen's (1313) Nongshu (農書 "Treatise on Agriculture") describes wooden instead of reed rafts as Ji Han mentions. Wang Zhen explains that the frame is like a fá (筏 "[bamboo] raft"), and that fēng means the roots of the aquatic plant gū (箛 Zizania latifolia, Manchurian wild rice). He says that floating fields are found more or less everywhere in Southeast China, and quotes a poem by Su Dongpo that describes floating fields on the West Lake at Hangzhou: "'The water drains away, the wild grass sprouts, and gradually a [fengtian] appears".

The chinampas, which have been used by the Aztecs on shallow lakes in the Valley of Mexico since the Middle Postclassic period (1150-1350), are the best-known floating gardens (technically, artificial islands separated by canoe-width channels). Several countries in Asia have actual floating gardens. In China, they are found not only in the Huai and Yangtze River area but also on Dian Lake in the Yunnan–Guizhou Plateau. Floating fields are also found on Kasumigaura, Ibaraki in Japan, Dal Lake in Kashmir, and Inle Lake in Myanmar.

=== Oranges ===
The Nanfang caomu zhuang has two entries (62 and 63) for Citrus trees: Jú (橘 Citrus × sinensis, Sweet Orange) and Gān (柑 Citrus reticulata, Mandarin Orange).

The Chü has white flowers and reddish fruits which have fragrant petals and a delicious taste. Since the time of Wu Ti of Han, there was a Minister of Oranges with a salary of two hundred shih [of rice], responsible for presenting oranges to the royal court. In the Huang-wu period of Wu (A.D. 222-229), Shih Hsieh 士燮, the Governor of Chiao-chih, once presented an orange specimen with seventeen fruits to one stalk, considered as a symbol of auspiciousness. The entire court entourage presented their congratulations. (62)

Shi Xie (137-226) was a Han dynasty Administrator of Jiaozhi commandery (present-day northern Vietnam). This story about Shi Xie sending as tribute a sweet orange plant with seventeen fruits to Sun Quan (r. 229-252), the founder of the Eastern Wu dynasty, is not recorded elsewhere, and Ma believes it is a forgery based on the (492-493) Songshu history record that in 33I Yu Liang sent a sweet orange plant with twelve fruits to the Jin dynasty court.

Li notes that the Yiwu Zhi (quoted in the Qimin yaoshu) may possibly be the original source for this Nanfang caomu zhuang entry: "the orange tree has white flowers and reddish fruits, which have fragrant peels and also sweet taste. It is produced in Kiangnan and not elsewhere". The Taiping Yulan quotes this same passage followed by an additional sentence: "There is an orange grove in Chiao-chih, where an administrative officer is installed, with a salary of 300 shih (picul) [of rice], who is responsible for presenting an annual tribute of oranges to the royal court."

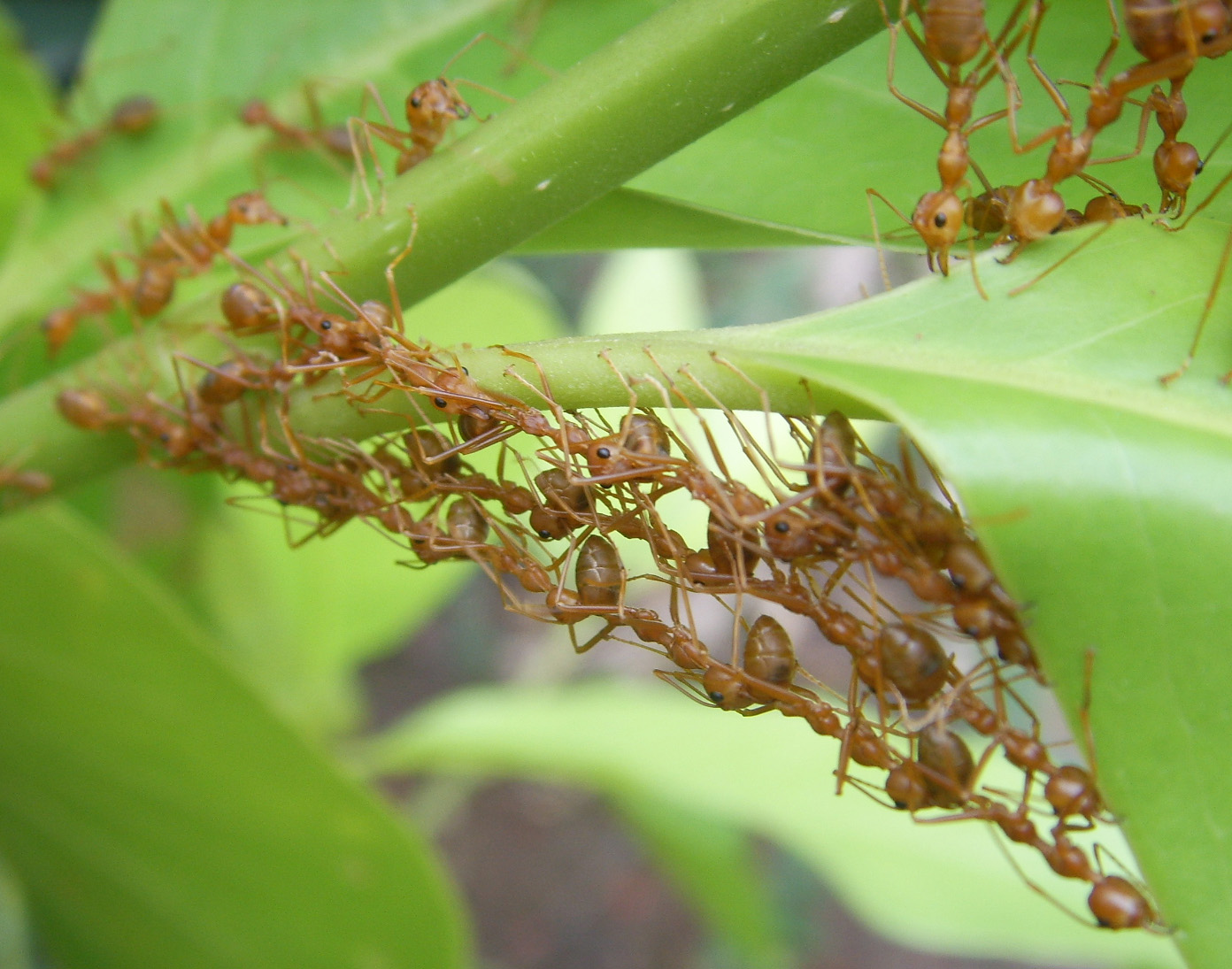
Nest construction by Oecophylla smaragdina workers

The Kan is a kind of orange with an exceptionally sweet and delicious taste. There are yellow and red kinds. The red ones are called Hu-kan 壺柑 (jar orange). In the market, the natives of Chiao-chih sell ants stored in bags of rush mats. The nests are like thin silk. The bags are all attached to twigs and leaves, which, with the ants inside the nests, are for sale. The ants are reddish-yellow in color, bigger than ordinary ants. In the south, if the Kan trees do not have this kind of ant, the fruits will all be damaged by many harmful insects and not a single fruit will be perfect. There are now two trees of Kan in the Hua-lin Garden. When in fruit, the Emperor has the court entourage wine and dine by their side and the fruits are picked and given to all. (63)

Húgān (壺柑) is now called pènggān (椪柑 Citrus poonensis, ponkan, Chinese honey orange"). Ma says the first few sentences appear Zhou Chu's (236-297) Fengtuji (風土記 "Record of Local Conditions"), which is the likely source for this Nanfang caomu zhuang entry. Both Duan Chengshi's (9th century) Yuyang zalu (酉陽雜俎) and the (early 10th century) Lingbiao luyi (嶺表錄異) retell the citrus ant story.

A number of scholars say this Nanfang caomu zhuang mandarin orange entry is the first reference in any literature to the entomological control of plant pests, as well as the earliest example of a biological control agent as an article of commerce.

The arboreal "citrus ant", Oecophylla smaragdina, Chinese huángjīngyǐ (黃猄蟻 "yellow fear ant"), is a weaver ant that binds leaves and twigs together with silk to form tight nests in a tree. At night, the citrus ants retire into these nests, and during the day, they leave the nests and forage for various insects that attack the orange trees and their fruit. To take advantage of these ants, a citrus grower secures a nest on one tree, then connects it to adjacent trees with bamboo strips for bridges, enabling the citrus ants to travel to and build new nests in neighboring trees, and eventually colonize the whole orchard. In 1915, the United States Department of Agriculture sent plant physiologist Walter Tennyson Swingle to China for research in varieties of orange resistant to citrus canker. In collaboration with George W. Groff and his students at Lingnan University in Guangzhou, they became the first Western scientists to encounter the cultivated citrus ant of southern China.

=== Herb ferment ===
The Cǎoqū (草麴, lit. "herb ferment") entry in the Nanfang caomu zhuang is the earliest description of wine production using a natural ferment made with rice flour and herbs. In Southern Chinese tradition, this special rice wine was prepared in advance for marriage ceremonies while the daughter was still young.

The traditional fermentation starter for Chinese wine is called jiǔqū (酒麴 "wine ferment", compounding jiǔ "wine; liquor" and qū "leaven; yeast") or jiǔyào (酒藥 "wine medicament", with yào "drug; medicine"), which is produced by inoculating a cereal dough with a previously-grown microbial culture, Yeast in winemaking is divided between natural, ambient wild yeast (such as caoqu) and cultured inoculated yeast (such as jiuqu).

In Nan-hai there are many fine wines, prepared not with yeast leaven but by pounding rice flour mixed with many kinds of herb leaves and soaked in the juice of Yeh-ko 冶葛. The dough, as big as an egg, is left in dense bushes under the shade. After a month, it is done, and is used to mix with glutinous rice to make wine. Thus if drunk heavily, even after awakening from intoxication, the head is hot and sweaty because there are poisonous herbs in it. Among the southerners, when a daughter reaches several years of age the family starts to brew wine on a large scale. After straining, and when the ponds become dry in the winter, the wine is put in jars, tightly sealed at the top and buried in the side of the ponds. When spring comes and the ponds are full of water, these jars are not removed. When the daughter is getting ready to be married, the pond edges are dug to remove the wine for use in feasting the guests at the marriage ceremony. It is called "girl's wine." The taste is exceedingly fine. (14)

Nanhai (南海 "south sea", in Guangzhou) was the capital of the ancient Jiaozhou province. Yěgé (冶葛) Gelsemium elegans or Heartbreak grass is a famous poisonous plant of southern China. Besides this "herb ferment" entry mentioning yege, the Nanfang caomu zhuang has a yege entry (26), and mentions it in the Chinese spinach entry (25, see above). Li notes that while the root contains poison, it is not clear whether caoqu used the leaves or the roots. Nǚjiǔ (女酒 lit. "women wine") first appears in the Zhouli ritual text meaning "female slave winemaker" who (in yin and yang gender separation) made wines for women in the royal palace, the staff of the Superintendent of Wines is said to include 10 eunuchs, 30 "wine-women", and 300 convicts.

Needham and Huang suggest that since it took one month for the herbal rice-flour dough to become infected by fungi (presumably mycelia), the process was probably not easily reproducible in areas outside South China.

The tradition of preparing wines for marriage ceremonies while the daughter was still young continued in the Shaoxing region of Zhejiang province until at least the early 20th century. Shaoxing wine is a famous variety of huangjiu fermented from rice, and it originated in Shaoxing, an ancient city in the southern Yue kingdom during the Warring States period. Qu Dajun's (17th century) Guangdong xinyu (廣東新語) confirmed that caoqu "herb ferment" was still used in the Guangdong area, and it was made from beans and rice mixed with plant materials such as shānjié (山桔 Glycosmis citrifolia)), làliǎo (辣蓼 Persicaria hydropiper), and mǎliǎo (馬蓼 Persicaria lapathifolia).

== Authenticity ==
Academic controversies over the authenticity of Ji Han's Nanfang caomu zhuang has been ongoing for over a century.

The first scholar to question the text's authenticity was Wen Dingshi (文廷式, 1856-1904), who said Ji Han could not have been the author because the theriac entry (19) says the physician Liu Juanzi (劉涓子, fl. 410), "used this plant to prepare pills and after taking them, attained immortality"; which is likely a copyist's mistake for the Daoist Juanzi (涓子) mentioned in the (c. 1st century BCE) Liexian Zhuan.

There is no reference to the Nanfang caomu zhuang in Ji Han's Book of Jin biography, nor in the bibliographies of the (636) Book of Sui or (945) Old Book of Tang, both of which do mention his collected works. The Nanfang caomu zhuang title is first recorded in Tang Shenwei's (唐慎微, 1108) Zhenglei bencao (證類本草) and You Mou's (尤袤, 1180) Suichutang shumu (遂初堂書目). The oldest extant edition is in the (1273) Baichuan xuehai (百川學海), printed by Zuo Gui (左圭).

On one side of the debate, Ma concludes the Nanfang caomu zhuang is unequivocally a forgery, compiled sometime between 1108, the year the Zhenglei bencao was first published, and 1194, the year You Mou died. On the other side, Needham, Lu, and Huang conclude that basically Ji Han's "text is authentic, though there may have been some later interpolations".

Li lists internal evidence that attests the historical validity of the Nanfang caomu zhuang text, or at least the major part of it. First, Ji Han used archaic and unusual names for certain plants instead of those which later became standard in the Tang and Song, for instance (45), jishexiang (雞舌香) instead of dingxiang (丁香) for cloves, indicating the antiquity of the text. Second, he wrote eight entries describing plants that later authors have never been able to identify. Third, Ji Han was occasionally confused regarding some plants where later botanists were not, for example (17), he mixed up Phrynium with Zingiber. Fourth, he mentions contemporary events, such as Aquilaria bark-paper (56) being presented as tribute to Emperor Wu of Jin in 284. Li concludes that although we cannot rule out the possibility of interpolations, we can be reasonably sure that the text, as it has come down to us in its present form since the late Song period, "represents on the whole a historically trustworthy account of the plants treated therein as they appeared in the southern regions around the third and fourth centuries".

Huang Xingzong's summary of the proceedings at an international symposium on the authenticity of the Nanfang caomu zhuang provides an overview of both sides in the debate: those who claim that the text is a 12th-century forgery compiled from early texts, and those who consider it a genuine 4th-century work with later interpolations.

In the first category of bibliographical evidence, some argued at the symposium that there is no reason to believe that the Nanfang caomu zhuang existed before the Song dynasty when the title first appeared, and when it did occur in pre-Song literature, it was often called the Nanfang caowu zhuang. Others responded that lack of citation in the dynastic histories, which was a common occurrence in Chinese literary history, does not necessarily mean that the book did not exist. Since Ji Han's preface explicitly said the book was compiled for the edification of his family, and not intended for public dissemination, it is not surprising that for generations its existence was not well known. Furthermore, there are unanswered questions. If the text suddenly first appeared in the Song dynasty, why did it not arouse the suspicion of learned bibliophiles? What would a forger gain by spending the time and effort necessary to compile such an admirable text but not accepting its authorship? Huang says the most reasonable hypothesis is that the Nanfang caomu zhuang appearance in a printed edition did not attract any special attention because it was common knowledge among the Song literati that Ji Han wrote the text in the 4th century.

In the second category of textual comparisons, there are numerous Nanfang caomu zhuang passages that are similar or identical to those on the same topics in other classical works about South China. Ma identified passages in books written between the 3rd and 12th centuries as "sources" for many Nanfang caomu zhuang entries, for example, the Yiwu zhi was a probable sources for the banana and orange descriptions. Ma claimed that at least thirteen entries were copied from (early 10th century) Lingbiao luyi (岭表錄異), and seven from (875) Beihulu (北戶錄). Symposium scholars who rejected this plagiarism hypothesis contended that it is more reasonable to conclude that the "sources" were themselves copied from the Nanfang caomu zhuang without acknowledgement, as early Chinese authors so often did. Furthermore, Hui-lin Li gave the entries on wild ginger (5) and chinkapin (73) as convincing examples. In the Nanfang caomu zhuang the descriptions make botanical sense, but the corresponding entries in Lingbiao luyi, though almost identical in language, lack one or two key words needed to render them botanically meaningful, thus indicating that the Nanfang caomu zhuang author had an intimate knowledge of plants and knew what he was writing about, whereas the Lingbiao luyi compiler was copying blindly from the older text.

In the third category of philological considerations, several discrepancies in book titles, personal names, and historical events quoted in the Nanfang caomu zhuang have led scholars in China and the West to question its authenticity. Jasmine (yeximing 耶悉茗, from Arabic yasmin) and sambac (moli 茉莉, from Sanskrit mallikā), according to the Beihulu, were introduced from Persia in 536, and therefore, could not have been known to Ji Han. In rebuttal, scholars cited evidence that jasmine was already well known in central China during the Jin dynasty, thus the mistake was in the Beihulu, and not in the Nanfang caomu zhuang.

The symposium participants reached consensus that the extant text contains interpolations by later writers, and probably first appeared in its current form during the Southern Song dynasty. Among the pro-forgery group, opinions about the date of fabrication varied considerably, perhaps Tang, Northern Song, or Southern Song. Huang says, "Based on what is known about Ji Han's life, his literary attainments, his love of plants, and his interest in alchemy, those opposed to the forgery thesis believe that he is a likely author for the Nanfang caomu zhuang."

== Sources ==
- Huang, H. T. 黃兴宗 (1986). "International Symposium on Nan Fang Cao Mu Zhuang". Chinese Science. 7: 71–8.
- Li, Hui-Lin (1979). Nan-fang ts'ao-mu chuang: a fourth century flora of Southeast Asia. The Chinese University Press.
- Ma, Tai-Loi 馬泰來 (1978). "The Authenticity of the 'Nan-Fang Ts'ao-Mu Chuang". T'oung Pao. 64 (4): 218–252. doi:10.1163/156853278X00023.
- Needham, Joseph; Wang, Ling (1954). Science and Civilisation in China, Volume 1 Introductory Orientations. Cambridge University Press.
- Needham, Joseph; Lu, Gwei-djen; Huang, Hsing-Tsung (1986). Science and Civilisation in China, Volume 6 Biology and Biological Technology, Part 1: Botany. Cambridge University Press.
- Needham, Joseph; Huang, Hsing-Tsung (2000). Science and Civilisation in China, Volume 6 Biology and Biological Technology, Part 5: Fermentations and Food Science. Cambridge University Press.
- Needham, Joseph; Bray, Francesca (1984). Science and Civilisation in China, Volume 6 Biology and Biological Technology, Part 2: Agriculture. Cambridge University Press.
- Reynolds, Philip K. (1940). "The Banana in Chinese Literature". Harvard Journal of Asiatic Studies. 5 (2): 165–181. doi:10.2307/2718023. JSTOR 2718023.

Footnotes
