= Fiji Love =

- Directed by: Tao Sheng
- Release date: November 21, 2014
- Running time: 89 minutes
- Country: China
- Language: Mandarin
- Box office: ¥0.89 million (China)

Fiji Love (Chinese: 斐济99°C爱情) is a 2014 Chinese romantic comedy film directed by Tao Sheng. It was released on November 21, 2014.

== Cast ==
- Jang Woo-hyuk
- Yao Xingtong
- Li Mao
- He Zhuoyan
- Zhao Duo-na
- Jin Cao
- Chen Tianwen
- Liu Zihao

== Reception ==
=== Box office ===
By November 25, 2014, the film had earned ¥0.89 million at the Chinese box office.
