= Sattawat Sethakorn =

Thai actor

Sattawat Sethakorn (ศตวรรษ เศรษฐกร; RTGS: Sattawat Setthakon; born 26 April 1982), also known by his stage name Tae (Thai: เต๊ะ; RTGS: Te) or his Chinese name Tang Chenyu (Chinese: 唐宸禹; pinyin: Táng Chényǔ), is a Thai actor and singer active in the Chinese-language entertainment industry. He began his career in Thailand, moved to Taiwan in the early 2000s, and has since worked on productions in mainland China as well.

== Career ==
At the age of 19, Sethakorn decided to move to Taiwan to develop his career further. He quickly improved his Chinese language abilities, only occasionally needing translation assistance in the course of his work.

== Personal life ==
Sethakorn was born in Kanchanaburi. His maternal grandfather was of Teochew Chinese descent and Taiwanese descent, while his other grandparents were native Thai people. His parents are schoolteachers. He has one sister, younger than him by three years. He attended high school at the Sethaburbampen School, Srinakharinwirot in Bachelor of Arts where he graduated after completing all the required coursework in just two years. He got married in a ceremony held in Japan in June 2013, and got divorced in 2016.

== Filmography ==
=== TV dramas in Thailand ===
Year	Thai title	Title	Role	Network	Notes	Ref.
1998	รักทีนเอจต้องเกรดเอ		Channel 5			
1998	ยุ่งนักรักซะเลย		Channel 3			
1998	ลุ้นรักทะลุมิติ		Channel 5			
1999	เจนนี่ นางสาวจำเป็นฮ่ะ		Channel 3			
2004	มังกรเดียวดาย	Lonely Dragon	Channel 5			
2005	คุณชายจำแลง		Channel 5			
2020	ขอเกิดใหม่ใกล้ ๆ เธอ		One 31			

=== Series ===
Year	Thai title	Title	Role	Network	Notes	Ref.
20			One 31			

=== Sitcom ===
Year	Thai title	Title	Role	Network	Notes	Ref.
2011	สามสาวเจ้าเสน่ห์		Channel 9 MCOT HD (30)			

=== TV series in China ===
Year	Chinese title	Title	Role	Network	Notes	Ref.
2001	偷偷愛上你	Taiji Prodigy	EBC東森綜合, ET Jacky, 中視無線台, TVB Jade			
2002	绝世双骄	The Legendary Siblings 2	CTS	Wuji		
2002	偷偷愛上你	In Love :: แอบ...รักเธอสุดหัวใจ	CTS	Zhang Cuishan		
2004	绝对计划		Ch			
2004	新九品芝麻官	Hail the Judge	GRT Pearl River Channel			
2004	小謝與秋容		Ch			
2005	天外飛仙 (電視劇)	The Little Fairy :: อภินิหารดาบมังกรสะท้านพิภพ	CTV, ATV	Fu Yuanbao		
2005	惡靈05	Evil Spirit 05	GTV			
2006	戀愛女王	Love Queen	CTS			
2006	天使情人	Angel Lover	SCC	Sunny		
2007	聊斋奇女子	The Fairies of Liaozhai	AHTV			
2008	大唐游俠傳	Datang Youxia Zhuan	Ch			
2008	大唐游侠传 (电视剧)	Paladins in Troubled Times	CCTV	Kongkong'er		
2008	鹿鼎記 (2008年電視劇)	Royal Tramp	Jiangsu TV			
2010	女媧傳說之靈珠	The Holy Pearl	ZJSTV	Wei Liao		
2011	大唐女將樊梨花	Legend of Fan Liwa	Shenzhen TV/SETV			
2011	西游记 (2011年电视剧)	Journey to the West (2011 TV series)	Shenzhen TV/SETV			
2012	刁蠻俏御醫	Unruly Qiao	JXTV/HNTV,/OpenResty!/SETV			
2013	薛丁山 (电视剧)	ซิติงซาน ทายาทขุนศึกสะท้านแผ่นดิน	SRT			
2014	刘海砍樵 (2014年)	อภินิหารรักจิ้งจอกขาว	CCTV-8			
2014	新济公活佛	New Mad-Monk	HTV			
2015	反恐特战队	Anti-terrorism Special Forces I ∷ ทีมระห่ำ พิฆาตทรชน 1	Dragon TV/Chongqing TV			
2016	幸福又見彩虹	幸福又見彩虹	SZTV-1 HD/CHOCO TV			
2017	反恐特战队之猎影	Anti-terrorism Special Forces II ∷ ทีมระห่ำพิฆาตทรชน 2	JSTV			

== Films ==
- 2006: Go! Go! G-Boys
- 2016: The Golden Doll

Year	Title	Role	Note	Ref.
20				
20				

== Discography ==
- 1998 Teen 8 Grade A
- 1998 T-Speed
- 1999.7 守护天使
- 2000.7 再见，加州海滩
