= Fourth Sister Hu =

- Short story by Pu Songling
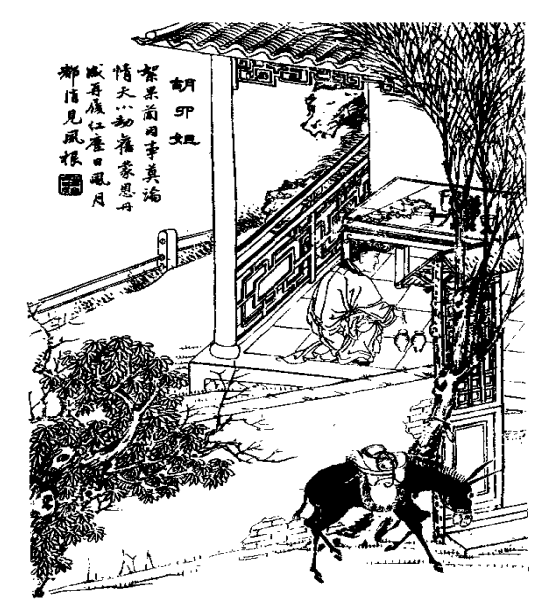
- 19th-century illustration from Xiangzhu liaozhai zhiyi tuyong (Liaozhai Zhiyi with commentary and illustrations; 1886)
- Original title: 胡四姐 (Hu sijie)
- Country: China
- Language: Chinese
- Genres: Zhiguai; Chuanqi; Short story

Publication
- Published in: Strange Tales from a Chinese Studio
- Publication date: 1740

Chronology
| The Tiny Gentleman (小官人) | Old Man Zhu (祝翁) |

"Fourth Sister Hu" (Chinese: 胡四姐; pinyin: Hú sìjiě) is a short story by Pu Songling, first published in Strange Tales from a Chinese Studio (1740). It revolves around a Chinese scholar who encounters a pair of fox spirits.

== Plot ==
One night, a Taishan-based scholar surnamed Shang is greeted in his study by a maiden who introduces herself as Third Sister Hu (胡三姐). Shang becomes infatuated with her and a few nights later, she introduces her sister, Fourth Sister Hu (胡四姐), to him. The demure and soft-spoken Fourth Sister Hu reveals to Shang that she and her sister are both fox spirits, and claims that Third Sister Hu has already caused the deaths of three men. Fourth Sister Hu offers Shang a fulu which successfully drives away Third Sister Hu. Shang has a brief affair with a rival fox spirit who is driven away by the Hu sisters.

Afterwards, an exorcist from Shanxi arrives at Shang's residence, intent on exacting revenge on the fox spirits who allegedly caused the death of his younger brother. He imprisons the Hu sisters in bottles sealed with pig bladder, but Shang manages to rescue Fourth Sister Hu; some time later, she becomes an immortal and repays Shang's kindness by informing him of his death date. In his postscript, Pu writes that Shang was a relative of his friend Li Wanyu (李文玉).

== Publication history ==
Originally titled "Hu sijie" (胡四姐), "Fourth Sister Hu" was written by Pu Songling probably in or before 1683 and first published in his 18th-century anthology Liaozhai zhiyi or Strange Tales from a Chinese Studio. It was fully translated into English as "Fourth Sister Hu" in the first volume of Sidney L. Sondergard's Strange Tales from Liaozhai published in 2008.

== Literary analysis ==
According to Allan Barr, Pu "experiments more extensively with the rivalry motif" and "probes creatively the theme of romantic competition" in "Fourth Sister Hu" by having multiple romantic interests compete for the protagonist's affection. However, "the scope for interplay is limited" owing to Third Sister's "malevolent propensities (that) forfeit our sympathy for her ... and disqualify her for Shang's love."

== Reception ==
Eighteenth-century editor Wang Jinfan (王金範), who published a "rather drastically altered" edition of Liaozhai in 1767, was critical of Pu's decision to include "Fourth Sister Hu" in his anthology of strange tales: "This book records the strange. But something like the Fourth Sister affair happens the world over–how can it be considered strange?" Nineteenth-century critic Feng Zhenluan (冯镇峦) reportedly found the story believable, insofar as "he does not see how Li (Wanyu) could have fabricated it".
