= Huijian Xinmo =

1966–1968 serialised novel by Liang Yusheng

- Author: Liang Yusheng
- Original title: 慧劍心魔
- Language: Chinese
- Genre: Wuxia
- Set in: 8th-century China
- Publisher: Ta Kung Pao
- Publication date: 23 May 1966 – 14 March 1968
- Publication place: Hong Kong
- Media type: Print
- ISBN: 9789576456763
- Preceded by: Longfeng Baochai Yuan

Huijian Xinmo
- Traditional Chinese: 慧劍心魔
- Simplified Chinese: 慧剑心魔
- Literal meaning: The Wise Sword and the Inner Demon
Transcriptions
Standard Mandarin
- Hanyu Pinyin: Huì Jiàn Xīn Mó
Yue: Cantonese
- Jyutping: Wai^{6} Gim^{3} Sam^{1} Mo^{1}

Huijian Xinmo (慧劍心魔), literally The Wise Sword and the Inner Demon, is a wuxia novel by Liang Yusheng first published as a serial between 23 May 1966 and 14 March 1968 in the Hong Kong newspaper Ta Kung Pao. It is the concluding part of a trilogy, following Datang Youxia Zhuan and Longfeng Baochai Yuan.

Set in eighth-century China during the Tang dynasty, the novel shifts focus from large-scale historical events to internal conflicts, exploring the moral and emotional struggles of the next generation. Its title, from the Buddhist saying huī huìjiàn, zhǎn xīnmó (揮慧劍, 斬心魔; "brandish the sword of wisdom and slay your inner demon"), reflects the novel's concern with inner turmoil, filial duty, and the reconciliation of vengeance with righteousness.

While readers have praised its rich characterisation of younger heroes and moral ambiguity, some critics have panned its complex plotting and how its resolution compares in dramatic tension with earlier volumes.

== Publication history ==
Huijian Xinmo was first published as a serial between 23 May 1966 and 14 March 1968 in the Hong Kong newspaper Ta Kung Pao. Subsequent reprints include a 1988 three-volume edition by Chinese Workers' Publishing House, a 1996 three-volume illustrated edition by Cosmos Books, a 1996 two-volume edition by Guangdong Travel and Tourism Press, and a 2012 two-volume edition by the Sun Yat-Sen University Press.

== Plot summary ==
The novel is set in eighth-century China during the Tang dynasty almost three decades after the power struggle in the wulin between the Dous and Wangs. Unknown to everyone, the Dou clan has a survivor, Dou Yuan, who has been training hard and plotting his revenge all these years.

Wang Yanyu, who is fatally wounded by Dou Yuan, instructs her son Zhan Bocheng to refrain from seeking vengeance and to take shelter under Chu Sui, who is formerly her father's second-in-command.

Zhan Bocheng becomes allies with Chu Sui's granddaughter, Chu Baoling, and her lover Liu Mang, and manages to prevent a treasure hoard left behind by the Wang clan from falling into the wrong hands. The treasure is then used to finance the activities of the outlaws led by Tie Mole, the current chief of the wulin.

Meanwhile, Dou Yuan becomes more obsessed with power and starts collaborating with wulin lowlifes, corrupt officials, warlords, and foreign powers in his quest to dominate the wulin. However, his schemes are thwarted by Zhan Bocheng, who is supported by the younger and older generations of heroes.

As the conflict escalates, the heroes unite to defeat Dou Yuan and his allies at the frontiers of the Tang Empire. Zhan Bocheng and Chu Baoling cripple Dou Yuan, rendering him unable to use his skills to commit evil again. The novel ends with peace restored to the wulin and the heroes marrying their respective romantic partners.

== Principal characters ==
- Zhan Bocheng (展伯承) – the protagonist, and Wang Yanyu and Zhan Yuanxiu's son who marries Tie Ning.
- Chu Baoling (褚葆齡) – Chu Sui's granddaughter and Zhan Bocheng's ally.
- Liu Mang (劉芒) – an outlaw and Chu Baoling's romantic partner.
- Tie Zheng (鐵錚) and Tie Ning (鐵凝) – Tie Mole and Han Zhifen's children who join the heroes in their fight.
- Dou Yuan (竇元) – Dou Lingfu's son and the main antagonist.
- Hua Zongdai (華宗岱) – a formidable martial artist who helps the heroes.
- Hua Jianhong (華劍虹) – Hua Zongdai's daughter who marries Tie Zheng.
- Tie Mole (鐵摩勒) – the current chief of the wulin who supports the younger generation of heroes together with his wife Han Zhifen (韓芷芬).
- Kongkong'er (空空兒) – an eccentric swordsman and ally of the heroes. He and his wife Xin Zhigu (辛芷姑) trained Tie Zheng and Tie Ning respectively.

== Reception and legacy ==
While Huijian Xinmo is less mentioned in academic studies compared to the two earlier novels in the trilogy, it has received mixed to positive reviews among readers. On Douban, it holds a rating of about 6.1/10 from dozens of users, with praise given to its ambitious scope, its intergenerational conflicts, and how it revisits characters from the earlier novels. Some readers, however, express that the narrative lacks the dramatic peaks or emotional force of Datang Youxia Zhuan and the romantic intensity of Longfeng Baochai Yuan.
