= Datang Youxia Zhuan =

1963–1964 wuxia novel by Liang Yusheng

- Author: Liang Yusheng
- Original title: 大唐游俠傳
- Language: Chinese
- Genre: Wuxia
- Set in: 8th-century China
- Publisher: Ta Kung Pao
- Publication date: 1 January 1963 - 14 June 1964
- Publication place: Hong Kong
- Media type: Print
- ISBN: 9789861465678
- Followed by: Longfeng Baochai Yuan

Datang Youxia Zhuan
- Traditional Chinese: 大唐游俠傳
- Simplified Chinese: 大唐游侠传
- Literal meaning: Story of the Wandering Hero of the Great Tang
Transcriptions
Standard Mandarin
- Hanyu Pinyin: Dà Táng Yóu Xiá Zhuàn
Yue: Cantonese
- Jyutping: Daai^{6} Tong^{4} Jau^{4} Haap^{6} Zyun^{6}

Datang Youxia Zhuan (大唐游俠傳), literally Story of the Wandering Hero of the Great Tang, is a wuxia novel by Liang Yusheng. It was first published as a serial in the Hong Kong newspaper Ta Kung Pao from 1 January 1963 to 14 June 1964. Set in China against the backdrop of the An Lushan rebellion in the mid-eighth century, it blends historical narrative with martial-arts fantasy to explore themes of loyalty, corruption, and the decline of the Tang dynasty. The novel follows a swordsman as he becomes entangled in political intrigue and the moral conflicts of the wulin.

Datang Youxia Zhuan is the first part of a trilogy, followed by Longfeng Baochai Yuan and Huijian Xinmo. It is regarded as one of Liang Yusheng's most historically resonant works and an early example of the "historical wuxia epic" form that later influenced wuxia writers such as Gu Long and Huang Yi.

== Publication history ==
Datang Youxia Zhuan was first published as a serial in the Hong Kong newspaper Ta Kung Pao from 1 January 1963 to 14 June 1964. Subsequent reprints include a 1985 three-volume edition by Heilongjiang People's Publishing House, a 1996 three-volume edition by Cosmos Books, a 1996 edition by Guangdong Travel and Tourism Press, and a 2012 two-volume edition by the Sun Yat-Sen University Press.

== Plot summary ==
The novel is set in eighth-century China during the reign of Emperor Xuanzong of the Tang dynasty. The Tang government weakens under corruption and nepotism, while the military governor An Lushan secretly prepares for a rebellion.

Meanwhile, a power struggle takes place in the wulin between two outlaw leaders, Dou Lingkan and Wang Botong, who are vying for the position of chief of the wulin. Dou Lingkan and his brothers are supported by the renowned swordsman Duan Guizhang, while Wang Botong has formed a covert alliance with An Lushan and sent his children to be trained by top-tier martial artists.

Tie Mole, the protagonist, is Dou Lingkan's godson. At one point, An Lushan's men kidnap Duan Guizhang's son to force Duan Guizhang to stay out of the conflict. The Dou clan is ultimately destroyed by the Wangs, with the Dou brothers meeting their ends at the hands of Wang Botong's daughter, Wang Yanyu. Tie Mole and Duan Guizhang survive with the help of Nan Jiyun and others, and vow to avenge the Dous.

Seven years later, Tie Mole completes his training in swordsmanship under a reclusive master and returns to the wulin. With his allies' help, he exposes Wang Botong's connections to An Lushan and destroys the Wangs' base. At one point, he is recruited by the Tang general Guo Ziyi to serve as a bodyguard to Emperor Xuanzong, but is forced to leave when the emperor blames him for Consort Yang's death and tries to poison him.

In the finale, Tie Mole and his allies join Tang forces in fighting An Lushan's rebels at the Siege of Suiyang. Many of them, including Duan Guizhang and Nan Jiyun, fall in battle, leaving Tie Mole and the next generation of heroes to continue their legacy.

== Principal characters ==
- Tie Mole (鐵摩勒) – Dou Lingkan's godson and a highly-skilled swordsman.
- Wang Yanyu (王燕羽) – Wang Botong's daughter who starts a romance with Tie Mole despite their families' enmity. She eventually marries Zhan Yuanxiu (展元修) and their son, Zhan Bocheng, is the protagonist of the last part of the trilogy.
- Han Zhifen (韓芷芬) – Han Zhan's daughter and a dianxue expert who marries Tie Mole.
- Nan Jiyun (南霽雲) – Tie Mole's ally and a swordsman who serves the Tang government.
- Xia Lingshuang (夏凌霜) – the daughter of Lu Mengdie's cousin Leng Xuemei and a highly-skilled swordswoman who marries Nan Jiyun.
- Kongkong'er (空空兒) – an eccentric swordsman who initially aligns with Wang Botong but later switches sides to help the heroes.
- Duan Guizhang (段珪璋) – a renowned swordsman who is also the Dous' brother-in-law. He and his wife Dou Xianniang (竇線娘) have a son, Duan Keye.
- Shi Yiru (史逸如) – a retired official and Duan Guizhang's close friend. He and his wife Lu Mengdie (盧夢蝶) have a daughter, Shi Ruomei.
- Dou Lingkan (竇令侃) – Tie Mole's godfather who leads an outlaw band with his four brothers.
- Wang Botong (王伯通) – an outlaw leader and Dou Lingkan's rival.
- Chu Sui (褚遂) – Wang Botong's second-in-command. His granddaughter Chu Baoling plays a key role in the last part of the trilogy.
- Emperor Xuanzong (唐玄宗) – the ruler of the Tang Empire.
- An Lushan (安祿山) – a military governor who starts a rebellion.

== Reception and legacy ==
Datang Youxia Zhuan is regarded as one of Liang Yusheng's most historically-grounded and politically resonant works. Set in eighth-century China during the An Lushan rebellion, the novel combines wuxia elements with historical fiction by portraying the Tang dynasty's decline as a metaphor for moral decay and corruption in the wulin.

Modern reassessments view Datang Youxia Zhuan as a foundational work in the Datang trilogy, praising its grand historical setting and emotional depth, though some readers have critiqued its pacing and the density of its political subplots.

== Adaptations ==
In 2008 the novel was adapted into a Chinese television series Paladins in Troubled Times produced by Zhang Jizhong, starring Victor Huang, Shen Xiaohai, He Zhuoyan, Liu Tianyue, Sattawat Sethakorn and Lu Chen.
