= Paladins in Troubled Times =

2008 Chinese television series

- DVD box art
- Also known as: Wandering Tang Dynasty Swordsman; Legend of the Great Tang Dynasty Hero
- 大唐游侠传
- Genre: Wuxia
- Based on: Datang Youxia Zhuan by Liang Yusheng
- Screenplay by: Liu Yi; Mo Mo
- Directed by: Zhao Jian; Huang Kemin; Lin Feng
- Starring: Victor Huang; Shen Xiaohai; Sattawat Sethakorn; He Zhuoyan; Liu Tianyue; Lu Chen
- Theme music composer: Wu Shaoxiong
- Ending theme: "True Love" (真爱) by Bo Wen
- Country of origin: China
- Original language: Mandarin
- No. of episodes: 31

Production
- Producers: Zhang Jizhong; Pu Shulin; Liu Yawen; Fan Xingchao
- Production location: China
- Running time: ≈ 45 minutes per episode

Original release
- Network: CCTV
- Release: 24 July 2008

Paladins in Troubled Times (大唐游侠传) is a 2008 Chinese wuxia television series adapted from the novel Datang Youxia Zhuan by Liang Yusheng. The series was produced by Zhang Jizhong, and starred Victor Huang, Shen Xiaohai, Sattawat Sethakorn, He Zhuoyan, Liu Tianyue and Lu Chen. It was first broadcast on CCTV in 2008.

== Synopsis ==
The story is set in eighth-century China during the Tang dynasty. Dou Lingkan, an outlaw leader, and his godson, Tie Mole, are passing through a town when they overhear a commotion. They realise that Wang Longke, a servant of the military governor An Lushan, is planning to steal a letter from a messenger sent by the general Guo Ziyi.

Apparently, Guo Ziyi has discovered that An Lushan is plotting a rebellion, and he wants to warn Emperor Xuanzong. Tie Mole saves the messenger and gets involved the power struggle. He is joined by several righteous martial artists as they attempt to undermine the An Lushan rebellion.

== Cast ==
- Victor Huang as Tie Mole
- Shen Xiaohai as Wang Longke
- Sattawat Sethakorn as Kongkong'er / Duan Keye
- He Zhuoyan as Wang Yanyu / Shi Ruomei
- Liu Tianyue as Xia Lingshuang
- Lu Chen as Han Zhifen
- Wang Jiusheng as Jingjing'er
- Ba Yin as Yang Mulao / Tie Kunlun / Huangfu Song
- Tong Chun-chung as Emperor Xuanzong
- Wang Gang as Qin Xiang
- Chen Jiming as Duan Guizhang
- He Sirong as Dou Xianniang
- Tu Men as An Lushan
- Li Zefeng as An Qingxu
- Rocky Hou as An Qingzong
- Yang Niansheng as Han Zhan
- Zhang Baijun as Dou Lingkan
- Wang Jianguo as Guo Ziyi
- Hu Qingshi as Gao Lishi
- Liu Peizhong as Yang Guozhong
- Gao Yuan as Yang Guifei
- Jiang Hualin as Geshu Han
- Wang Yuzhi as Wang Yanyu's wet nurse
- Ren Baocheng as Du Qianyun
- Zhao Qiang as Zhang Xun
- Chen Panjing as Duan Fei
- Xi Xianfeng as Liu Da
- Zhang Hengping as a blacksmith
- Shi Tongcui as the blacksmith's wife
- Liu Bing as Liu'er
- Li Yuchen as Gou'er
- Zhang Xueying as Hua'er
- Cheng Hongjun as Shi Yiru
- Li Yuan as Mobei Heibao
- Xu Hongzhou as Cui Qianyou
- Song Songlin as Huobo Guiren
- Zhao Shuijin as Li Heng
- Gong Zhixi as Wang Botong
- Tian Yu as Madam Wang
- Tian Haipeng as an opera troupe master
