= Chryse (Caria) =

Former town in ancient Caria

Chryse (Greek: Χρύση) was a town of ancient Caria, mentioned by Stephanus of Byzantium as being near Halicarnassus.

The site of Chryse is unlocated.
