= Chryse (Lesbos) =

Chryse (Ancient Greek: Χρύση) was a town of ancient Lesbos.

The site of Chryse is unlocated.
