= Chryse (Bithynia) =

Chryse (Greek: Χρύση) was a town of Bithynia, mentioned by Stephanus of Byzantium as being near Chalcedon.

The site of Chryse is unlocated.
