= Chryse (Hellespont) =

Chryse (Greek: Χρύση) was a town on the Hellespont, mentioned by Stephanus of Byzantium as being between Abydus and Ophrynium, which would put it on the Asian side, in ancient Mysia.

The site of Chryse is unlocated.
