= The Tale of Hongxian =

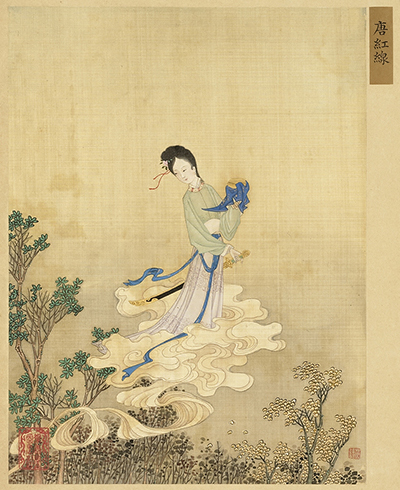
- Painting by He Dazi (赫達資) at the National Palace Museum located in Taipei, Taiwan.
- Original title: 紅線 (Hongxian)
- Country: China
- Language: Chinese
- Genres: Chuanqi; Short story

Publication
- Published in: Ganze yao (甘澤謠)
- Media type: Print (Book)
- Publication date: c. 868

"Hongxian" (Chinese: 紅線; pinyin: Hóngxiàn; lit. 'Red Threads') or "The Tale of Hongxian" (紅線傳) is a Chinese short story dating back to the Tang dynasty, believed to have been written by either Yuan Jiao (袁郊) or Yang Juyuan (杨巨源). "Hongxian" revolves around a general's maid who strikes fear into the heart of a rival general by infiltrating his bedroom and stealing a golden box.

== Plot ==
The story takes place as the An Lushan Rebellion is waning; the Tang government orders the general Xue Song to lead the Zhaoyi (昭義) army headquartered in Fuyang, Hebei and take control of Shandong, a hotbed of rebel generals. To strengthen the ties between the various military governors, the government also has Xue Song marry his daughter and son to the son of Weibo governor Tian Chengsi and the daughter of Huazhou governor Linghu Zhang (令狐彰) respectively. However, irritated by the Weibo heat, Tian Chengsi decides to annex the cooler Shandong area.

Distressed by Tian's intentions, Song confides in his maid (Note: Some variants of the story, such as those collected in Bai Kong liutie (白孔六帖), Lei shuo (類說), and Gan zhu ji (紺珠集), identify Hongxian as a "singing girl" instead of a maid.) named Hongxian (紅線), (Note: Both Gujin shihua (古今詩話）and Tangshi jishi (唐詩紀事) suggest that the maid was named "Hongxian" (紅線) or "Red Threads" because both her palms had lines that resembled red threads.) who is also a skilled ruan player and so competent in classical literature and history that she also serves as Song's "inner record-keeper". Hongxian tells her master not to worry, before heading out to Tian's territory at midnight to conduct reconnaissance. She returns the next morning and recounts her mission to Song: having avoided detection by Tian's troops, she snuck into Tian's chambers to find him fast asleep; instead of assassinating him, she stole a golden box next to his bed containing numerous precious items; and before leaving, she bound together some of Tian's sleeping maids by their tops and skirts without awaking them.

She gives this box to Song, who immediately orders a messenger to return it to Tian, under the guise that he had captured a thief who had the box. Startled but grateful for the return of his possessions, the Weibo general lavishes many gifts upon Song and denies having had any intention of annexing his territory. From then onwards, Tian agrees to consider himself and Song kinsmen and work together, finally agreeing to the marriage arrangement that would solidify their partnership. Some time later, Hongxian reveals to her master that in her past life, she was a male healer who accidentally killed a pregnant woman and her unborn twins, and was therefore made to atone in the next life as a woman; having paid her dues, she now wishes to retreat to the mountains. Song organises a farewell banquet for her and commissions poet Leng Chaoyang (冷朝陽) to write a poem in her honour. After this banquet, Hongxian disappears and is never seen again.

== Authorship and publication history ==
"Hongxian" is one of the eight chuanqi tales collected in Ganze yao (甘澤謠) or Ballads of Timely Rainfall by Yuan Jiao (袁郊; fl. 868). The Ganze yao is a collection of eight short stories set between the sixth and eighth centuries in China, written and compiled within the Tang dynasty. As with the tradition of chuanqi, “Hongxian” and other stories of the Ganze yao weave together fact and fiction. For example, the character Xue Song was in fact a real military figure, although he was the military governor of Xiangwei and four other prefectures, not Luzhou.

Although most modern scholars believe that Yuan wrote "Hongxian", other commentators, for example E. D. Edwards and Liu Ying (劉瑛) have attributed authorship of the story to the eighth-century writer Yang Juyuan (杨巨源). Other sources, like the German translation of the story, attribute the author to be Pei Xing - the same author as the story Nie Yinniang. The original Ganze yao was lost during or before the Yuan dynasty, but "Hongxian" was partially preserved in Song dynasty leishu, whose editors had access to the original Ganze yao; the Taiping Guangji was the earliest anthology to feature "Hongxian".

== Literary significance ==
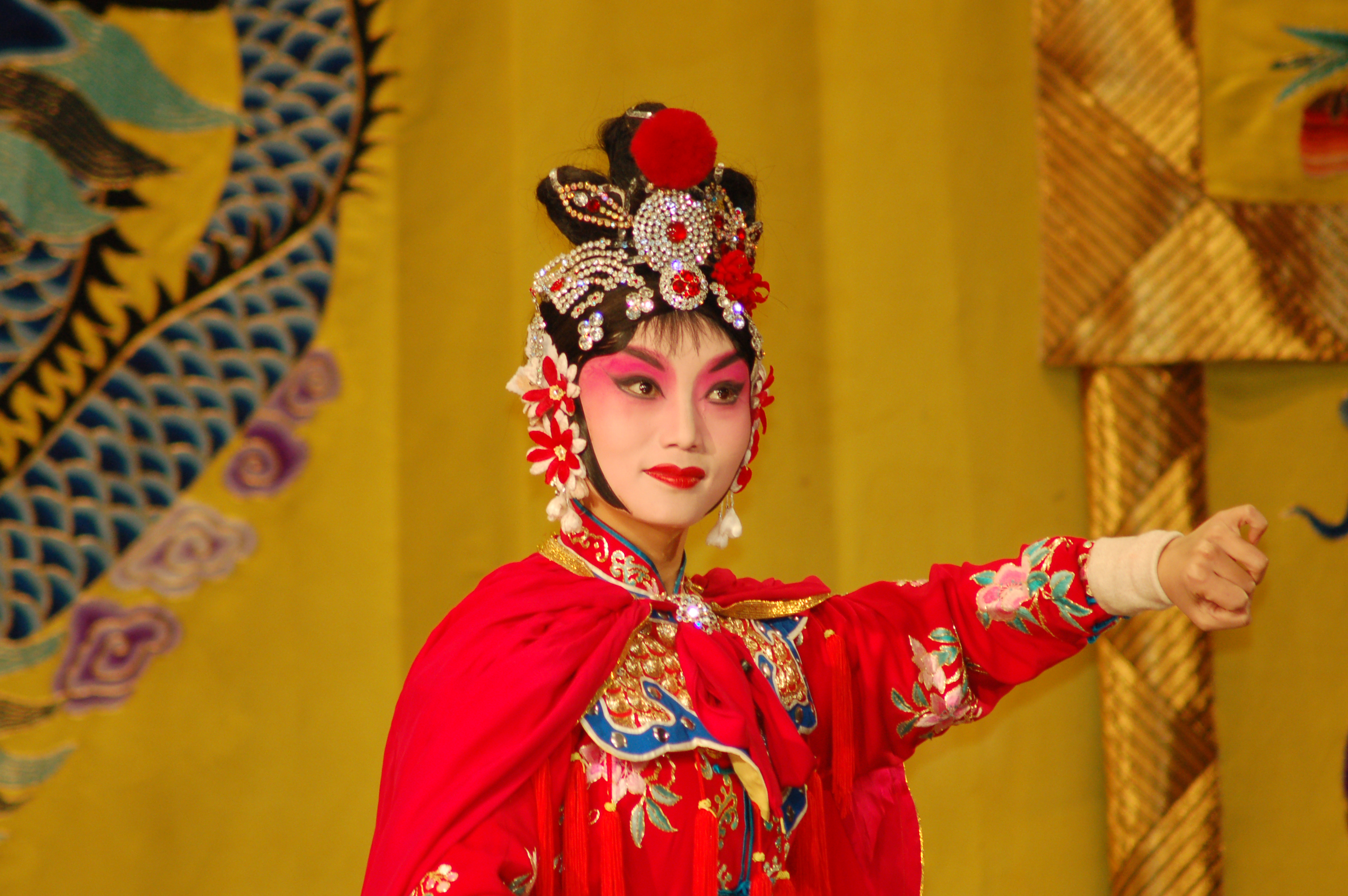
The Peking opera performance "Hongxian Steals a Box" is an adaptation of the short story.

The protagonist Hongxian is one of the earliest documented instances of the nüxia (女俠) or "female knight-errant", a common character in mainstream Tang dynasty fiction. Hongxian's story is a very traditional portrayal of the nüxia, with her intelligence, and not her appearance, playing a key role in her story. She also has a steadfast moral compass, has magical powers, and has a high level of education. All of these cement her role as a nüxia in chuanqi literature.

The story also reflects contemporary attitudes toward women in Tang society. Elite women during this period often enjoyed relative social mobility compared to earlier eras, with access to education and occasional informal influence in political or military contexts. While societal expectations remained restrictive, some Tang literary works—including The Tale of Hongxian—portrayed women taking decisive and influential action, suggesting an evolving cultural perception of female agency. According to Sarah M. Allen, "the narrative focuses from the beginning on the woman herself (and) does not portray her as a figure of desire." While described as an intellectually and culturally accomplished lady, Hongxian is "not said to be beautiful", and Xue Song "admires her talents without becoming infatuated with her." Because she is revealed to be a man trapped in a woman's body, some people claim that this story also reinforces attitudes of male superiority.

The story itself has been the basis for a Peking opera of the same name, as well as various songs and poems.

== Translations ==
- Carl Hanser, “Pe Hsing”, Die Golden Truhe, 1959, pp. 138–145.
- Elizabeth Te-chen Wang, “Red Thread Maiden”, Ladies of the Tang, 1973, pp. 263–277.
- Wolfgang Bauer and Herbert Franke. The Golden Casket: Chinese Novellas of Two Milliennia. Translated from German to English by Christopher Levenson. New York: Harcourt, Brace and World, 1964.
- William H. Nienhauser, “‘Hongxian’ 紅線”, Tang Dynasty Tales: A Guided Reader. Vol. 1. World Scientific, 2010, pp. 1–47. ISBN 978-981-4287-28-9.
