= Lu Chen (actress) =

Chinese actress

- Born: September 20, 1987 (age 38); Harbin, Heilongjiang, China
- Education: Beijing Film Academy
- Occupation: Actress
- Years active: 2006 - present

Lu Chen (born September 20, 1987) is a Chinese actress. She is a contracted artist to the talent agency Cathay Media.

== Biography ==
Lu was discovered by a principal photographer of the television series Eternal Beauty in 2006 and was invited the participate in the project. She has been acting since then.

== Filmography ==
=== Films ===
Year	English Title	Original title	Role	Notes
2009	Fancier	票友	Lu Ling	
2011	Love from the Pearls	珠源情	Ah Jiao	
2012	Wuye Mijing	午夜迷鏡	Zheng Xinling	

=== TV series ===
Year	English Title	Original title	Role	Notes
2006	Eternal Beauty	那時花開	Huang Lili	
2006	A Marriage Code	婚姻密碼	Ping Xueqing	
2007	Paladins in Troubled Times	大唐遊俠傳	Han Zhifen	
2008	New Four Generations Living Together	四世同堂	Guan Zhaodi	
2008	The Book and the Sword	書劍恩仇錄	Li Yuanzhi	
2009	The Heaven Sword and Dragon Saber	倚天屠龍記	Yang Buhui	
2009	The Legend of Meng Laichoi	孟來財傳奇	Meng Xiaoyun	
2009	The Girl in Blue	佳期如夢	Ruan Jiangxi	
2010	The Depths of Flowers	百花深處	Fang Yun	
2011	Drama Act	大戲法	Situ Jin	
2012	The Darling Mother and Daughter	寶貝媽媽寶貝女	Lian Xin	
2013	The World On Other Me	世界上的另一個我	Ding Haimo	
2013	Love in the Spring	愛在春天	Chen Wanbi	
