= Yiwu Zhi =

Han dynasty treatise

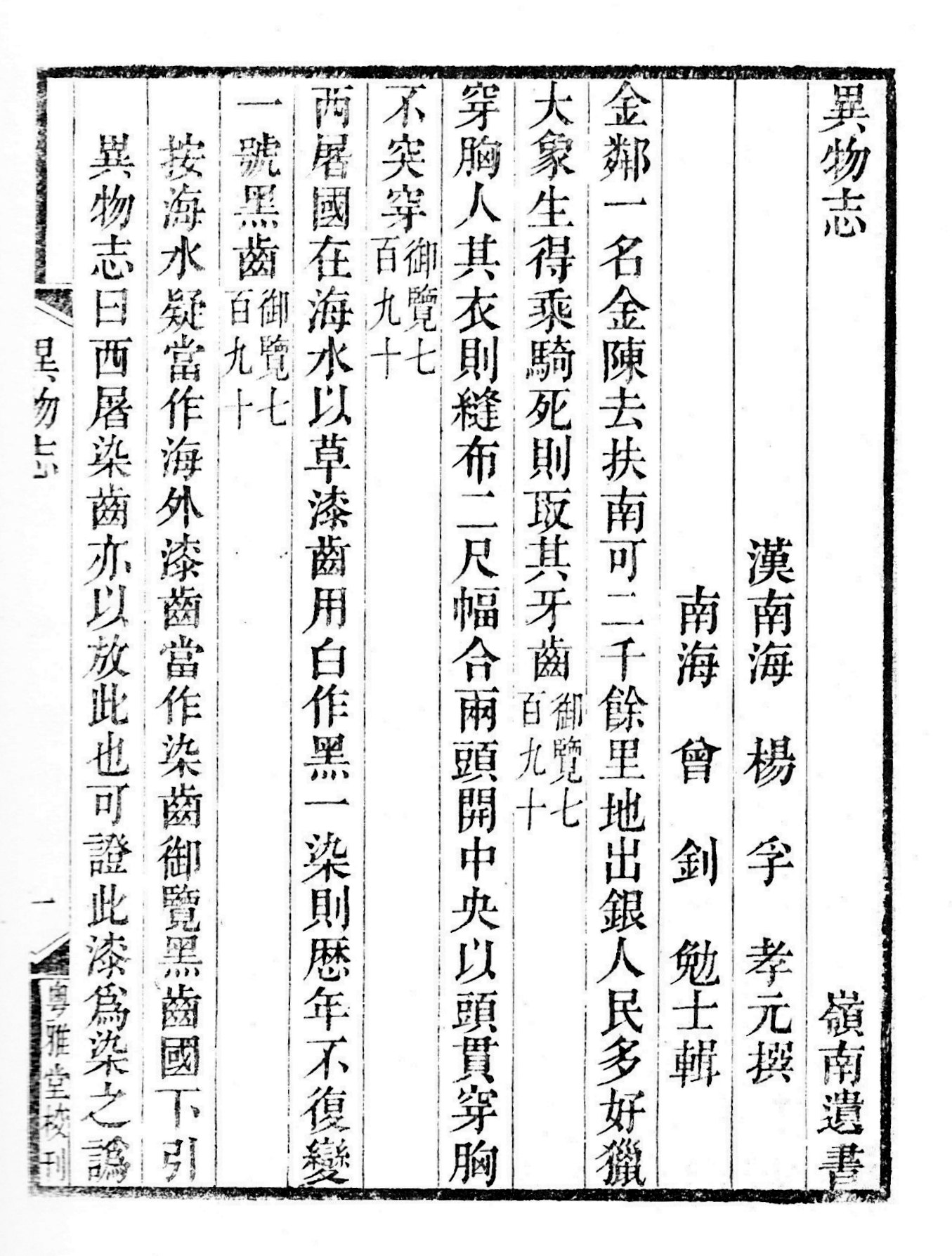
- A page from the Record of Foreign Matters
- Chinese: 异物志
Transcriptions
Standard Mandarin
- Hanyu Pinyin: Yiwu Zhi

The Yiwu Zhi or Record of Foreign Matters, also known as the Jiaozhou Yiwu Zhi (交州异物志), Nanyi Yiwu Zhi (南裔异物志), Jiaozhi Yiwu Zhi (交趾异物志) and Yangyilang Zhushu (杨议郎著书) amongst others, is a treatise written by Eastern Han court advisor Yáng Fú (杨孚) (Note: Not to be confused to the official Yáng Fù (楊阜) who flourished during the late Eastern Han & Cao Wei eras) covering the people, geography, fauna, rice cultivation, fruit, trees, grass, bamboo, insects and fish of the South China Sea region. It is the first written Chinese account of the Lingnan area's produce, production methods and aboriginal customs and uses a detailed methodology that would be adopted as standard by later works of this genre including the Nanfang Caomu Zhuang, Linhai Shuishang Yiwu Zhi (临海水上异物志), Nanzhou Yiwu Zhi (南州异物志), Hainan Yiwu Zhi (凉州异物志), Bashu Yiwu Zhi (巴蜀异物志), Funan Yiwu Zhi (扶南异物志), Lingnan Yiwu Zhi (岭南异物志), Nanzhong Bajun Yiwu Zhi (南中八郡异物志), Guangzhou Yiwu Zhi (广州异物志), and Lingbiao Luyi (岭表录异).

== Contents ==
- Human geography: Land of the Tattooed Forehead People (Diaoti Guo 雕题国), Territory of the Wolf (Lang Guo 狼国), Xitu Guo (西屠国), Rau peoples Wuhu (乌浒), Yellow Haired People (Huang tou Ren 黄头人), Kingdom of Funan, Phra Nakhon Si Ayutthaya Province Jinlin (金邻) Sidiao Guo (斯调国).
- Animals and birds: Hepu cattle, gorilla, elephant, rhinoceros, macaque, peacock.
- Fish and insects: mussel, cowrie, water snake, hawksbill turtle, whale, jellyfish.
- Fruit: Japanese banana, betel, coconut, olive, bayberry, sugar cane, sweet potato.
- Plants: banyan, cotton, laurel, cardamom, giant hyssop, ginger-lily
- Precious stones: Kunlun jade, mica

== Versions ==
The Book of Sui and the New Book of Tang both cite from the Yiwu Zhi but from the time of the Song dynasty (960–1279) the book became lost, although scattered references to it remain in works such as Beitang Shuchao (北堂书抄), Imperial Reader of the Taiping Era, Extensive Records of the Taiping Era, Yiwen Julei (艺文聚类), Commentary on the Water Classic, Qi Min Yao Shu, Guangyun, Taiping Huanyu Ji, Hailu Suishi (海录碎事), Compendium of Materia Medica, Guang Qunfang Pu (广群芳谱), Guangdong Xinyu (广东新语), and Guangzhong Tongzhi (广东通志) amongst others.

In the first year of the Qing Daoguang Emperor (1821), Zeng Zhao (曾钊) produced a version of Yangyilang Zhushu (杨议郎著书) from ancient textual sources then in 1849 the Yiwu Zhi.
In March 1947, The Commercial Press in Shanghai published a compendium of works based on the Yiwu Zhi followed in 1991 by the Guangdong Publishing Group (广东省出版集团) issuing the Lingnan Cultural Archive (岭南文库), which included Wu Yongzhang's (吴永章) work Yiwu Zhi Jiyi Jiaozhu (异物志辑佚校注).

== See also ==
- Chinese encyclopedias
