= Chryse (Troad) =

Human settlement

Coordinates: 39°31′17″N 26°04′58″E

Chryse (Greek: Χρύση), or Chrysa (Χρύσα), was a town of the ancient Troad, mentioned by Pliny as being on the coast north of Cape Lectum.

The site of Chryse is located near modern Göztepe.
