= Pei Xing =

Tang official and writer

Pei Xing (Chinese: 裴鉶; pinyin: Péi Xíng; Wade–Giles: P’ei Hsing; ca. 825-880) was a Chinese writer and official in the era of the Tang dynasty. He is the author of Tales of the Marvelous (Chuanqi 传奇; commonly called Pei Xing’s Chuanqi 裴鉶傳奇) a collection of which the original has long been lost; only some stories contained within it have been preserved to this day through quotations in the Taiping guangji (Extensive records of the Taiping era). As Tang official he rose to the position of Deputy Military Commissioner of Chengdu in 878.

Woodblock print of the Kunlun slave Mole (left) and his master Cui (right) from the 17th century.

The Hanyu da zidian f.e. is using his works Cui Wei zhuan 崔炜传, Wei Zidong zhuan 韦自东传, Zhang Wupo zhuan 张无颇传, and Shanzhuang yeguai lu 山庄夜怪录 in the edition of the collectaneum Gujin shuohai 古今说海.

== Selected works ==
- Cui Wei zhuan 崔炜传
- Wei Zidong zhuan 韦自东传
- Zhang Wupo zhuan 张无颇传
- Shanzhuang yeguai lu 山庄夜怪录

== See also ==
- Kunlun Nu
- Nie Yinniang

== Bibliography ==
- Zhou Lengqie 周楞伽 (ed./comm.): Pei Xing Chuanqi 裴鉶傳奇. Shanghai guji chubanshe 上海古籍出版社. Shanghai 1980 (online)
