= Nie Yinniang =

Chinese story by Pei Xing

"Nie Yinniang" (Chinese: 聶隱娘; pinyin: Niè Yǐnniáng) is a short story written in Classical Chinese by Pei Xing (裴鉶), a Chinese writer who lived during the Tang dynasty. The story is set in 9th century China and tells the story of Nie Yinniang who was trained in martial arts from a young age. She is the daughter of Nie Feng, a general under Tian Ji'an, the ruler of the de facto independent fanzhen of Weibo. The story was published in the collection Pei Xing Chuanqi (裴鉶传奇).

== Plot ==
At the age of 12, Nie Yinniang was trained in swordsmanship and the art of stealth, enabling her to assassinate targets undetected. When she returned home after five years of training, her father was terrified of her exceptional skills and reluctant to ask her why she regularly disappeared after dusk without explanation.

Having gained insight into the human condition through her training, Nie Yinniang chose a man who made a living by polishing mirrors as her husband. After her father's death, she was recruited by the general Tian Ji'an as an assistant.

During Emperor Xianzong's reign, Tian Ji'an developed an adversarial relationship with another general Liu Changyi, who sought advice from a clairvoyant. Nie Yinniang turned against Tian Ji'an and joined Liu Changyi. A furious Tian Ji'an sent Jingjing'er to kill Nie Yinniang and Liu Changyi, but Jingjing'er ended up being slain by Nie Yinniang. Tian Ji'an then sent Kongkong'er to assassinate Liu Changyi but Nie Yinniang foiled the attempt. Liu Changyi, finally safe, treated Nie Yinniang very well.

A few years later, Nie Yinniang left Liu Changyi after he was reassigned to serve in the capital Chang'an. She even showed up at his funeral to pay her respects and mourn him.

== Movie adaptation ==
The Assassin (Chinese: 刺客聶隱娘) is a 2015 martial arts film directed by Taiwanese director Hou Hsiao-hsien. At Cannes, Hou won the award for Best Director for this film. It was released in China on 27 August 2015. It was selected as the Taiwanese entry for the Best Foreign Language Film at the 88th Academy Awards.

== See also ==
- Chinese literature
- chuanqi
- Wuxia
