= Wulin Sanjue =

1972 wuxia novel by Liang Yusheng

- Author: Liang Yusheng
- Original title: 武林三絕
- Language: Chinese
- Genre: Wuxia
- Set in: 15th-century China
- Publisher: Ta Kung Pao
- Publication date: 1 October 1972 – 16 August 1976
- Publication place: Hong Kong
- Media type: Print
- ISBN: 9787807658450
- Preceded by: Lianjian Fengyun Lu
- Followed by: Guangling Jian

Wulin Sanjue
- Traditional Chinese: 武林三絕
- Simplified Chinese: 武林三绝
- Literal meaning: Three Supreme Experts of the Wulin
Transcriptions
Standard Mandarin
- Hanyu Pinyin: Wǔ Lín Sān Jué
Yue: Cantonese
- Jyutping: Mou^{5} Lam^{4} Saam^{1} Zyut^{6}

Wulin Sanjue (武林三絕), literally Three Supreme Experts of the Wulin, is a wuxia novel by Liang Yusheng. It was first published as a serial between 1 October 1972 and 16 August 1976 in the Hong Kong newspaper Ta Kung Pao. Set in 15th-century China during the Ming dynasty after the Tumu Crisis, the novel follows a new generation of martial artists entangled in personal rivalries, romantic conflicts, and political conspiracies.

Wulin Sanjue is the fifth instalment in the Pingzong series, following Lianjian Fengyun Lu and preceding Guangling Jian, and is also loosely connected to Kuangxia Tianjiao Monü. The novel is noted for extending Liang Yusheng's late-career experimentation with interconnected narratives across historical periods. Although it was first published as a newspaper serial, it has not been reprinted as a standalone book edition until 2012, resulting in its relative obscurity compared to Liang Yusheng's more widely circulated works.

== Publication history ==
Wulin Sanjue was first published as a serial between 1 October 1972 and 16 August 1976 in the Hong Kong newspaper Ta Kung Pao and has not been reprinted in book form, unlike Liang Yusheng's other novels. In 2012, the Sun Yat-Sen University Press published a book edition of Wulin Sanjue.

== Plot summary ==
The story is set in 15th-century China during the Ming dynasty after the Tumu Crisis when the wulin has mobilised to form a militia to resist oppression by corrupt officials and foreign invasion by the Oirats and wokou. This has made the militia a threat to the Ming government, whose spies have infiltrated the wulin.

A new generation of heroes rises: Huo Tianyun, Feng Mingyu, Shangguan Yingjie, Gu Lingzhu, Hua Yufeng, and Zhou Jianqin. Feuds inherited from the previous generations drive conflict among the six. Shangguan Yingjie seeks revenge on Huo Tianyun for his senior's death in a contest against Huo Tianyun's godfather Huo Tiandu, while Gu Lingzhu vows to kill Shangguan Yingjie over her parents' deaths. Zhou Jianqin and Hua Yufeng also face a family rivalry. The only neutral party, Feng Mingyu, helps to reconcile them.

After peace is restored, romantic entanglements arise: Zhou Jianqin loves Huo Tianyun, who is engaged to Feng Mingyu; Huo Tianyun and Gu Lingzhu fall for each other; and Shangguan Yingjie grows close to both Feng Mingyu and Gu Lingzhu. In the end, all six find partners — Huo Tianyun with Feng Mingyu, Shangguan Yingjie with Gu Lingzhu, and Zhou Jianqin with Hua Yufeng.

The three couples are then drawn into a new crisis when a Sanskrit copy of the Heart Sutra — rumoured to conceal secrets on martial arts — is stolen en route to Mount Wutai. They manage to recover the missing text near the Tibetan–Indian border, and return to expose traitors in the Ming government collaborating with foreign powers.

== Principal characters ==
- Shangguan Yingjie (上官英傑) – Tan Yuchong's heir.
- Feng Mingyu (風鳴玉) – Ling Yunfeng's apprentice, and a descendant of Feng Tianyang and Yun Zhongyan.
- Huo Tianyun (霍天雲) – Huo Tiandu's godson and apprentice.
- Gu Lingzhu (谷靈珠) / Gu Feixia (谷飛霞) – Liu Qingyao's heir.
- Zhou Jianqin (周劍琴) – Zhou Shanmin and Shi Cuifeng's daughter, and Feng Mingyu's sworn sister.
- Hua Yufeng (華玉峰) – a descendant of Hua Guhan and Liu Qingyao.

== Reception and legacy ==
Although Wulin Sanjue was first published as a serial in the Hong Kong newspaper Ta Kung Pao between 1 October 1972 and 16 August 1976, several bibliographic and retrospective accounts indicate that the work was never formally published as a standalone book, which has limited its circulation and formal critical reception. However, it is cited in institutional catalogues that document Liang Yusheng's collection of works.

Academic surveys and cultural histories of the modern wuxia genre consider the novel to be representative of Liang Yusheng's late-career writing style, in which he interlinked his novels across historical eras. In such treatments, Wulin Sanjue has been discussed as part of Liang Yusheng's broader experiment with multi-volume interconnections and a wide range of characters.
