= Guangling Jian =

1972 wuxia novel by Liang Yusheng

- Author: Liang Yusheng
- Original title: 廣陵劍
- Language: Chinese
- Genre: Wuxia
- Set in: 15th-century China
- Publisher: Hong Kong Commercial Daily
- Publication date: 3 June 1972 – 31 July 1976
- Publication place: Hong Kong
- Media type: Print
- ISBN: 9787306043757
- Preceded by: Wulin Sanjue
- Followed by: Baifa Monü Zhuan

Guangling Jian
- Traditional Chinese: 廣陵劍
- Simplified Chinese: 广陵剑
- Literal meaning: Sword of Guangling
Transcriptions
Standard Mandarin
- Hanyu Pinyin: Guǎng Líng Jiàn
Yue: Cantonese
- Jyutping: Gwong^{2} Ling^{4} Gim^{3}

Guangling Jian (廣陵劍), literally Sword of Guangling, is a wuxia novel by Liang Yusheng. It was first published as a serial between 3 June 1972 and 31 July 1976 in the Hong Kong newspaper Hong Kong Commercial Daily. It is the sixth and final instalment of the Pingzong series, following Wulin Sanjue, but some characters are mentioned by name in Liang Yusheng's Tianshan series.

Set in mid-15th-century China during the Ming dynasty, the story centres on the young swordsman Chen Shixing, who inherits a martial arts manual from the previous generation and becomes entangled in a struggle against corrupt officials and foreign invaders.

Blending martial-arts adventure with themes of music, loyalty, and mortality, Guangling Jian is noted for its elegiac tone and literary style. The ancient tune "Guangling Melody" (廣陵散) recurs as a central motif symbolising heroism and loss.

== Publication history ==
Guangling Jian was first published as a serial between 3 June 1972 and 31 July 1976 in the Hong Kong newspaper Hong Kong Commercial Daily. Subsequent reprints include a 1985 four-volume edition by Baihua Literature and Art Publishing House, a 1985 edition by Heilongjiang and Korean Ethnic Publishing House, a 1988 three-volume edition by Kunlun Publishing House, a 1996 three-volume edition by Guangdong Travel and Tourism Press, a 2000 four-volume edition by Cosmos Books, and a 2012 three-volume edition by the Sun Yat-Sen University Press.

== Plot summary ==
The story is set in 15th-century China during the Ming dynasty. Chen Shixing, the grandson of a renowned guqin player, has a serendipitous encounter that leads him to the legendary swordsman Zhang Danfeng. Zhang Danfeng, who is dying after exhausting himself in a last hurrah against his enemies, teaches Chen Shixing his most powerful skills and entrusts him with the mission of delivering a swordplay manual to Huo Tiandu at Mount Heaven.

After three years of self-training, Chen Shixing sets out on his quest, starting a romance with Zhang Danfeng's great-niece, Yun Hu, while joining her in seeking justice for the victims of the corrupt official Long Wenguang. As political corruption spreads, Chen Shixing and his allies intervene to prevent the Ming government from signing a humiliating treaty with the Oirats. Along the way, Chen Shixing and Yun Hu uncover conspiracies within the wulin, while their companions find their own intertwined fates of love and duty.

Long Wenguang allies himself with the Oirats but eventually meets his downfall. Fatally poisoned in the final battle, Chen Shixing fulfils his promise to deliver Zhang Danfeng's swordplay manual to Huo Tiandu at Mount Heaven, and then marries Yun Hu in his last days. Before dying, he plays the "Guangling Melody" on his guqin — a final tribute to his master and a symbol of his life's harmony and sorrow.

== Principal characters ==
- Chen Shixing (陳石星) – the protagonist and Zhang Danfeng's last apprentice.
- Yun Hu (雲瑚) – Yun Hao's daughter who becomes Chen Shixing's companion and lover.
- Duan Jianping (段劍平) – a descendant of the Dali Kingdom's royal family who befriends Chen Shixing.
- Han Zhi (韓芷) – a highly-skilled martial artist who marries Duan Jianping.
- Yun Hao (雲浩) – Yun Zhong and Tantai Jingming's son and a well-known martial artist in the wulin.
- Shan Boqun (單拔群) and Lei Zhenyue (雷震岳) – two famous figures in the wulin who serve as the heroes' allies.
- Zhang Danfeng (張丹楓) – the top swordsman in the wulin who trains Chen Shixing before dying.
- Huo Tiandu (霍天都) – a swordsman based in Mount Heaven and Zhang Danfeng's nominal apprentice. His own apprentice Yue Mingke is the founder of the Mount Heaven Sect, linking the Pingzong series to the Tianshan series.
- Chen Jieyi (陳劫遺) – Chen Shixing's grandfather and an accomplished guqin player.
- Long Wenguang (龍文光) – a corrupt Ming official who defects to the Oirats.
- Long Chengbin (龍成斌) – Long Wenguang's nephew and one of the main antagonists.

== Reception and legacy ==
Guangling Jian is regarded as one of Liang Yusheng's more introspective and elegiac works. Critics note that it departs from the fast-paced adventures of his earlier novels in favour of literary descriptions of music, poetry, and landscape, with the ancient tune "Guangling Melody" (廣陵散) and the motif of a "lost" swordplay technique serving as recurring symbols. This emphasis on aesthetics and introspection is considered to be representative of Liang Yusheng's mid- to late-career writing style.

Scholars have highlighted the novel's tragic register, interpreting the protagonist's fate and the repeated invocation of the "Guangling Melody" as reflections on the cost of heroism and the sorrow of personal loss amidst public duty. Frequent depictions of death and bereavement give the novel a pervasive elegiac tone that distinguishes it within the Pingzong series.

Critical responses are not uniformly positive. Some readers find the long poetic and scenic digressions excessive, arguing that they slow the plot and weaken dramatic momentum. Others, however, praise the story's depth and cultural richness, even if it lacks the narrative drive of Liang Yusheng's earlier novels.

The novel has been cited in discussions of the "cultured swordsman" (文士型侠客) archetype of the "new school" wuxia genre that emerged in Hong Kong in the 1950s. Scholars view it as a bridge between Liang Yusheng's action-oriented early works and his later, more meditative explorations of duty, art, and mortality.
