= Mingdi Fengyun Lu =

1968 wuxia novel by Liang Yusheng

- Author: Liang Yusheng
- Original title: 鳴鏑風雲錄
- Language: Chinese
- Genre: Wuxia
- Set in: 13th-century China
- Publisher: Hong Kong Commercial Daily
- Publication date: 24 June 1968 – 19 May 1972
- Publication place: Hong Kong
- Media type: Print
- ISBN: 9789622575790
- Preceded by: Hanhai Xiongfeng
- Followed by: Fengyun Leidian

Mingdi Fengyun Lu
- Traditional Chinese: 鳴鏑風雲錄
- Simplified Chinese: 鸣镝风云录
- Literal meaning: Chronicle of the Whistling Arrows
Transcriptions
Standard Mandarin
- Hanyu Pinyin: Míng Dí Fēng Yún Lù
Yue: Cantonese
- Jyutping: Ming^{4} Dik^{1} Fung^{1} Wan^{4} Luk^{6}

Mingdi Fengyun Lu (鳴鏑風雲錄), literally Chronicle of the Whistling Arrows, is a wuxia novel by Liang Yusheng. It was first published as a serial in the newspaper Hong Kong Commercial Daily from 24 June 1968 to 19 May 1972. Set in 13th-century China, the novel follows a group of martial artists who band together to resist the rising Mongol Empire amidst the wars between the Song and Jin empires.

Being the second longest of Liang Yusheng's novels at a length of approximately 1.24 million Chinese characters, Mingdi Fengyun Lu is known for its expansive historical setting, patriotic themes, and emphasis on collective action over individual heroism. It is loosely connected to Liang Yusheng's other novels set in the same historical period, including Kuangxia Tianjiao Monü, Hanhai Xiongfeng and Fengyun Leidian. Critics and scholars have described the novel as representative of Liang Yusheng's transition towards broader historical and moral narratives in the "mature" or later phase of his writing career.

== Publication history ==
Mingdi Fengyun Lu was first published as a serial in the newspaper Hong Kong Commercial Daily from 24 June 1968 to 19 May 1972. Subsequent reprints include a 1988 edition by Sichuan Ethnic Publishing House, a 1989 four-volume edition by Writers Publishing House, a 1992 eight-volume edition by Cosmos Books, a 1996 five-volume edition by Heilongjiang People's Publishing House, a 1996 four-volume edition by Guangdong Travel and Tourism Press, and a 2012 five-volume edition by the Sun Yat-Sen University Press.

== Plot summary ==
The story is set in 13th-century China during the wars between the Song, Jin and Mongol empires. The wulin has mobilised to form a militia to defend the Song Empire, while the Mongols and Jin Empire have also established a secret alliance targeting the militia.

Han Dawei, a prominent figure in the wulin, sends his daughter, Han Peiying, to Yangzhou to marry Gu Xiaofeng according to an arrangement made by their families. However, Gu Xiaofeng loves Xi Yujin, who kidnaps Han Peiying to stop the marriage. Xi Yujin treats Han Peiying kindly and manages to convince her to withdraw. Returning home, Han Peiying befriends Gong Jinyun and Gongsun Pu, who are already engaged to each other.

Back in Luoyang, Han Dawei is accused of betraying the wulin by Gu Xiaofeng's uncle, Ren Tianwu, who is secretly a spy working for the Mongols. Ren Tianwu leads the convoy escorting treasure to the militia into an ambush that apparently kills Gu Xiaofeng. Believing Gu Xiaofeng lost, Xi Yujin marries Xin Longsheng. Their marriage fails when they cannot consummate it after Xin Longsheng is poisoned during his wedding by a woman he scorned before. Meanwhile, Gu Xiaofeng survives and later reunites with Han Peiying; she forgives him for cancelling their arranged marriage and they remain on good terms.

After being rescued from captivity, Han Dawei discovers that his vengeful ex-lover, Xin Rouyi, is behind his wife's death and confronts her. Their confrontation is interrupted by Gong Zhaowen, a formidable martial artist who cripples Xin Rouyi and forces her to teach him her poison-based skills. Seeking power, Gong Zhaowen pledges allegiance to the Mongols, prompting his daughter, Gong Jinyun, to leave him.

Xin Longsheng, manipulated by Jin agents, tries to force Gong Zhaowen to surrender an antidote that could cure him of his poisoning, but falls into a ravine and is saved by Che Wei. Ashamed of his past misdeeds, Xin Longsheng reforms and falls in love with Che Qi, Che Wei's daughter.

Meanwhile, Gu Xiaofeng and Han Peiying, having endured numerous trials, grow close and join their wulin allies to thwart a coup in the Jin capital Zhongdu. Xi Yujin, disillusioned after her failed marriage, later finds new happiness with Zhao Yihang. Gong Zhaowen, having fallen into a state of zouhuorumo from practising Xin Rouyi's poison-based skills, is cured by his son-in-law, Gongsun Pu, and repents.

At the turn of the year, the wulin unites to defeat the Mongol–Jin forces, halting an invasion. Peace is temporarily restored, and the surviving couples celebrate their marriages.

== Principal characters ==
- Gu Xiaofeng (谷嘯風) – the protagonist and a family friend of the Hans.
- Han Peiying (韓佩瑛) – Han Dawei's daughter and Gu Xiaofeng's fiancée.
- Gongsun Pu (公孫璞) – Gongsun Qi and Sang Qinghong's son and Geng Zhao's apprentice.
- Gong Jinyun (宮錦雲) – Gong Zhaowen's daughter and Gongsun Pu's fiancée.
- Xin Longsheng (辛龍生) – Xin Rouyi's nephew and Wen Yifan's apprentice.
- Xi Yujin (奚玉瑾) – Gu Xiaofeng's ex-lover who marries Xin Longsheng but later divorces him.
- Xi Yufan (奚玉帆) – Xi Yujin's brother.
- Han Dawei (韓大維) – a retired martial artist and wealthy landlord in Luoyang.
- Zhao Yihang (趙一行) – Tu Baicheng's apprentice who eventually marries Xi Yujin.
- Wen Yifan (文逸凡) – the leader of the wulin in Jiangnan.
- Che Wei (車衛) – a reclusive martial artist who saves Xin Longsheng from death.
- Che Qi (車淇) – Che Wei's daughter and Xin Longsheng's eventual wife.
- Gong Zhaowen (宮昭文) – an accomplished martial artist and one of the main antagonists.
- Ximen Muye (西門牧野) – a villain who controls the wulin in Guandong.
- Zhu Jiumu (朱九穆) – a villain who is also Han Dawei's nemesis.
- Xin Rouyi (辛柔荑), also known as Xin Shisigu (辛十四姑) – a martial artist highly-skilled in using poison.
- Ren Tianwu (任天吾) – Gu Xiaofeng's maternal uncle who betrays the wulin and serves the Mongols as a spy.
- Hua Guhan (華谷涵), Liu Qingyao (柳清瑤) and Tan Yuchong (檀羽衝) – the top three fighters in the wulin who support the militia.
- Longxiang (龍象) – the Mongols' royal adviser and top fighter.
- Wanyan Zhangzhi (完顏長之) – a Jin prince and general who oversees the secret Mongol–Jin alliance.

== Reception and legacy ==
Mingdi Fengyun Lu is one of Liang Yusheng's lengthy, late-career works first published in serial form from 1968 to 1972. It is noted for its wide range of characters, grand historical setting, and overtly patriotic themes which depict the wulin of the Song Empire as resisting aggression from the ascendant Mongol Empire.

Contemporary and later commentators tend to mention Mingdi Fengyun Lu as an example of a transition in Liang Yusheng's writing style towards incorporating large-scale historical contexts in his later works. Some literary commentators observe that Liang Yusheng's post-1960 novels, while ambitious in scope, received comparatively less critical attention than his earlier, more concise works.

Critical appraisals of the novel emphasise two recurring points. First, its fusion of historical and martial-arts elements is praised for foregrounding loyalty, honour, and collective resistance within a historical setting. Second, critics frequently cite the novel's exceptional length and broad range of characters as limiting factors, arguing that the multiplicity of plot threads can dilute dramatic focus and lead to uneven character development.

University theses and scholarly overviews reference the novel when discussing Liang Yusheng's serialised novels, publishing history, and the evolution of his writing style in the later phase of his career.
