= Nüdi Qiying Zhuan =

1961 historical-wuxia novel by Liang Yusheng

- Author: Liang Yusheng
- Original title: 女帝奇英傳
- Language: Chinese
- Genre: Historical fiction Wuxia
- Set in: 7th-century China
- Publisher: Hong Kong Commercial Daily
- Publication date: 1 July 1961 – 6 August 1962
- Publication place: Hong Kong
- Media type: Print
- ISBN: 9789575698300

Nüdi Qiying Zhuan
- Traditional Chinese: 女帝奇英傳
- Simplified Chinese: 女帝奇英传
- Literal meaning: The Female Emperor and the Heroic Genius
Transcriptions
Standard Mandarin
- Hanyu Pinyin: Nǚ Dì Qí Yīng Zhuàn
Yue: Cantonese
- Jyutping: Neoi^{5} Dai^{3} Kei^{4} Jing^{1} Cyun^{4}

Tanggong Enyuan Lu
- Traditional Chinese: 唐宮恩怨錄
- Simplified Chinese: 唐宫恩怨录
- Literal meaning: Chronicle of Gratitude and Revenge in the Tang Palace
Transcriptions
Standard Mandarin
- Hanyu Pinyin: Táng Gōng Ēn Yuàn Lù
Yue: Cantonese
- Jyutping: Tong^{4} Gung^{1} Jan^{1} Jyun^{3} Luk^{6}

Nüdi Qiying Zhuan (女帝奇英傳), literally The Female Emperor and the Heroic Genius, is a historical-wuxia novel by Liang Yusheng. It was first published as a serial between 1 July 1961 and 6 August 1962 in the Hong Kong newspaper Hong Kong Commercial Daily under the title Tanggong Enyuan Lu (Chronicle of Gratitude and Revenge in the Tang Palace) before being retitled for later book editions.

Set in seventh-century China during the Tang dynasty, the novel interweaves court intrigue with adventure, exploring themes of loyalty, idealism, and moral conflict through characters drawn from Chinese history. Owing to its historical depth and restrained use of combat scenes, it has often been described as closer to a historical romance than a conventional wuxia work.

== Publication history ==
Nüdi Qiying Zhuan was first published as a serial between 1 July 1961 and 6 August 1962 in the Hong Kong newspaper Hong Kong Commercial Daily. Subsequent reprints include a 1985 edition by Heilongjiang Korean Ethnic Publishing House, a 1990 two-volume edition by International Cultural Publishing, 1993 and 2000 two-volume editions by Cosmos Books, a 1996 edition by Guangdong Travel and Tourism Press, a 1996 two-volume edition by Jiangsu Literature and Culture Publishing House, and a 2012 two-volume edition by the Sun Yat-Sen University Press.

== Plot summary ==
The story is set in seventh- and eighth-century China during the reign of Wu Zetian, the only woman in Chinese history to rule as the emperor of China after usurping power from the ruling House of Li of the Tang dynasty.

Zhangsun Junliang, a highly-skilled swordsman, raises and trains Shangguan Wan'er in swordsmanship to prepare her for avenging her grandfather, who had been falsely accused of treason and executed for opposing Wu Zetian. Years later, when a grown-up Shangguan Wan'er finally meets Wu Zetian, she gives up her quest for vengeance and instead chooses to serve in Wu Zetian's court.

Li Yi, a member of the House of Li, had fled the palace after Wu Zetian's rise to power. Years later, after failing to overthrow Wu Zetian, he encounters Wu Zetian's niece, Wu Xuanshuang, who is enamoured with him. Torn between loyalty and affection, Li Yi's moral struggle deepens when he learns that his childhood friend, Shangguan Wan'er, now serves his enemy.

After a failed attempt on Wu Zetian's life, Li Yi escapes with help from Zhangsun Junliang and his daughter, Zhangsun Bi. Li Yi marries Zhangsun Bi and they settle in Mount Heaven, where they have a son, Li Ximin.

Seven years later, Li Yi gets involved in a power struggle when Wu Zetian's nephew, Wu Chengsi, conspires with the Göktürks to seize the succession to his aunt's throne. After Li Ximin is kidnapped by the Göktürks, Li Yi joins forces with Wu Xuanshuang to rescue him, only to lose Zhangsun Bi, who dies from poisoning while pregnant. Grieving, Li Yi returns to the capital and exposes Wu Chengsi's treachery.

During this time, Wu Zetian has decided against making Wu Chengsi the crown prince. In a final confrontation, Li Yi is poisoned to death by Princess Taiping, Wu Zetian's daughter. Shangguan Wan'er marries Wu Zetian's son Li Xian, while Wu Xuanshuang chooses to dedicate the rest of her life to raising the orphaned Li Ximin.

== Principal characters ==
- Li Yi (李逸) – Li Jiancheng's grandson and a member of the House of Li.
- Wu Xuanshuang (武玄霜) – Wu Zetian's niece.
- Shangguan Wan'er (上官婉兒) – Shangguan Yi's granddaughter who serves under Wu Zetian.
- Wu Zetian (武則天) – the only woman in Chinese history to rule as the emperor of China.
- Zhangsun Junliang (長孫均量) – a swordsman and retired official.
- Zhangsun Bi (長孫璧) – Zhangsun Junliang's daughter and Li Yi's wife.
- Li Ximin (李希敏) – Li Yi and Zhangsun Bi's son.
- Wu Chengsi (武承嗣) – Wu Zetian's nephew and Wu Xuanshuang's cousin.
- Li Xian (李顯) – Wu Zetian's son and heir who marries Shangguan Wan'er.
- Princess Taiping (太平公主) – Wu Zetian's influential daughter.

== Reception and legacy ==
Nüdi Qiying Zhuan has received favourable but relatively modest attention from readers and scholars. On Douban, it holds an average rating of around seven out of ten, with users praising Liang Yusheng's refined prose, classical allusions, and moral complexity, while some consider the pacing to be slower than his other novels.

Nüdi Qiying Zhuan has been described in essays as one of Liang Yusheng's more "literary" and introspective novels. Commentators believe that the novel's dense historical content and tragic tone have limited its appeal for screen adaptation because, unlike some of Liang Yusheng's other works, Nüdi Qiying Zhuan has never been adapted into film or television.
