= Feifeng Qianlong =

1966 wuxia novel by Liang Yusheng

- Author: Liang Yusheng
- Original title: 飛鳳潛龍
- Language: Chinese
- Genre: Wuxia
- Set in: 12th-century China
- Publisher: Cheng Wu Pao
- Publication date: November 1966
- Publication place: Hong Kong
- Media type: Print
- ISBN: 9789576456329

Feifeng Qianlong
- Traditional Chinese: 飛鳳潛龍
- Simplified Chinese: 飞凤潜龙
- Literal meaning: Flying Phoenix and Hidden Dragon
Transcriptions
Standard Mandarin
- Hanyu Pinyin: Fēi Fèng Qiǎn Lóng
Yue: Cantonese
- Jyutping: Fei^{1} Fung^{6} Cim^{4} Lung^{4}

Feifeng Qianlong (飛鳳潛龍), literally Flying Phoenix and Hidden Dragon, is a wuxia novel by Liang Yusheng. It was first published as a serial in the Hong Kong newspaper Cheng Wu Pao (正午報) in November 1966. Set in 13th-century China, the story mixes espionage, romance, and tragedy against the backdrop of the wars between the Song and Jin dynasties, and the rise of the Mongol Empire.

The novel is one of Liang Yusheng's shorter serials and loosely connected to his other novels set in the Song dynasty, such as Kuangxia Tianjiao Monü, Hanhai Xiongfeng, Mingdi Fengyun Lu, and Fengyun Leidian. Critics have described it as a compact, suspense-driven work that departs from Liang Yusheng's longer novels through its focus on betrayal and moral conflict.

== Publication history ==
Feifeng Qianlong was first published as a serial in the Hong Kong newspaper Cheng Wu Pao (正午報) in November 1966. Subsequent reprints include a 1995 edition by Storm & Stress Publishing Company, and a 1996 edition by Cosmos Books.

== Plot summary ==
The story is set in 13th-century China against the backdrop of the wars between the Song and Jin dynasties, while the Mongol Empire rises in the north.

In the Jin capital Zhongdu, Lu Shixiong passes a series of tests and joins the yanjingyuan, a secret institution established by the Jin prince Wanyan Zhangzhi to study martial arts manuals stolen from the Song dynasty. Lu Shixiong also marries Wanyan Zhangzhi's goddaughter, Dugu Feifeng, and they have two children over the next five years.

Around the time, a Song spy known as "Hidden Dragon" is operating in Zhongdu, and he turns out to be Meng Zhonghuan, Dugu Feifeng's ex-lover. Lu Shixiong is also revealed to be a Mongol spy sent to steal secrets from the yanjingyuan with the aid of Zhuma, his former romantic partner in Mongolia.

Just as Lu Shixiong frets over how to get past the tight security, Meng Zhonghuan breaks into the yanjingyuan and disables all the traps. Wanyan Zhangzhi orders Lu Shixiong to reset the traps, providing him the perfect opportunity to steal the secrets and leave them at a collection point for Zhuma. Upon completing his mission, Lu Shixiong plans to leave Zhongdu for good, so he returns home to take one last look at his family. Dugu Feifeng, who is already suspicious of her husband, confronts him and learns the truth.

Meanwhile, Wanyan Zhangzhi has discovered Lu Shixiong's true identity and sent his men to capture the spy. Meng Zhonghuan shows up, fends off Wanyan Zhangzhi's men, and takes the prince's son hostage. It turns out that Meng Zhonghuan has stolen the secrets from Zhuma after she picked them up, and he intends to take Dugu Feifeng away with him.

Lu Shixiong, shocked by the sudden turn of events, commits suicide in shame for letting down his family and failing his mission. Meng Zhonghuan, still holding the hostage, forces Wanyan Zhangzhi to allow Dugu Feifeng and her children to leave. However, Dugu Feifeng feels guilty for betraying her godfather, so she also takes her own life. A heartbroken Meng Zhonghuan leads the children safely to his wulin allies in the Song dynasty before killing himself too.

== Principal characters ==
- Dugu Feifeng (獨孤飛鳳), nicknamed "Sky Soaring Phoenix" (沖天鳳) – Wanyan Zhangzhi's goddaughter and Lu Shixiong's wife.
- Meng Zhonghuan (孟中還), nicknamed "Hidden Dragon of the Southern Sea" (南海潛龍) – a swordsman serving as a spy for the Song Empire in Zhongdu.
- Lu Shixiong (魯世雄) – a Mongol spy who marries Dugu Feifeng.
- Zhuma (珠瑪) – Lu Shixiong's previous romantic partner from Mongolia.
- Wanyan Zhangzhi (完顏長之) – a Jin prince and general who oversees the yanjingyuan.

== Reception and legacy ==
Feifeng Qianlong is one of Liang Yusheng's shorter works and is commonly categorised together with his other novels set in the Song dynasty. It was first published as a serial in the Hong Kong newspaper Cheng Wu Pao (正午報) from November 1966 and has subsequently been reprinted in collected editions.

Scholarly studies of Liang Yusheng's writings situate Feifeng Qianlong among his mid-1960s works, pointing out how it is different from many of his longer novels by being relatively more concise and suspense-driven. Academic overviews and theses also cite the novel when discussing variations in length, tone, and narrative experiment across Liang Yusheng's works.

Contemporary press and later retrospectives characterise the novel as blending espionage and melodramatic romance with traditional wuxia motifs. Bibliographic and exhibition materials from Hong Kong include Feifeng Qianlong in collected reprints of Liang Yusheng's works.

== Adaptations ==
The novel was adapted into a 1981 Hong Kong film The Spy in the Palace produced by Great Wall Movie Enterprises.
