= Pingzong Xiaying Lu =

1959 wuxia novel by Liang Yusheng

- Author: Liang Yusheng
- Original title: 萍蹤俠影錄
- Language: Chinese
- Genre: Wuxia
- Set in: 15th-century China
- Publisher: Ta Kung Pao
- Publication date: 1 January 1959 – 16 February 1960
- Publication place: Hong Kong
- Media type: Print
- ISBN: 9786263755192
- Preceded by: Huanjian Qiqing Lu
- Followed by: Sanhua Nüxia

Pingzong Xiaying Lu
- Traditional Chinese: 萍蹤俠影錄
- Simplified Chinese: 萍踪侠影录
- Literal meaning: Chronicle of Wandering Heroes
Transcriptions
Standard Mandarin
- Hanyu Pinyin: Píng Zōng Xiá Yǐng Lù
Yue: Cantonese
- Jyutping: Ping^{4} Zung^{1} Hap^{6} Jing^{2} Luk^{6}

Pingzong Xiaying Lu (萍蹤俠影錄), literally Chronicle of Wandering Heroes, also translated as The Wanderer Chronicles, is a wuxia novel by Liang Yusheng. It was first published as a serial between 1 January 1959 and 16 February 1960 in the Hong Kong newspaper Ta Kung Pao. The novel is the second part of the Pingzong series, following Huanjian Qiqing Lu and preceding Sanhua Nüxia.

Set in 15th-century China during the Ming dynasty, the story follows Yun Lei and Zhang Danfeng, descendants of rival families whose romance unfolds amidst political turmoil and moral conflict. Blending history, romance, and martial-arts adventure, the novel explores ideals of loyalty, personal virtue, and national duty.

Pingzong Xiaying Lu is regarded as one of Liang Yusheng's representative works and a milestone in modern wuxia fiction. It has inspired several film and television adaptations, most notably the 1984 Hong Kong television series Chronicles of the Shadow Swordsman.

== Publication history ==
Pingzong Xiaying Lu was first published as a serial between 1 January 1959 and 16 February 1960 in the Hong Kong newspaper Ta Kung Pao. Subsequent reprints include a 1993 two-volume edition by Cosmos Books, a 1996 edition by Guangdong Travel and Tourism Press, and 2012, 2014 and 2021 two-volume editions by the Sun Yat-Sen University Press.

== Plot summary ==
The novel is set in 15th-century China when there are growing tensions between the Ming dynasty and Oirats. It starts with a feud between the Yun and Zhang families. The Oirat chancellor Zhang Zongzhou had detained the Ming diplomat Yun Jing and made him suffer for 20 years. Although Yun Jing had managed to escape back to Ming territory, he had received an imperial edict ordering him to commit suicide. Before taking poison, he had instructed his family to avenge him by killing Zhang Zongzhou and his descendants.

Years later, Yun Jing's granddaughter Yun Lei encounters Zhang Danfeng, forming a strong bond with him upon discovering that their swordsmanship styles complement each other perfectly. Their budding romance, however, collapses when Yun Lei learns that Zhang Danfeng is Zhang Zongzhou's son.

Yun Lei gradually learns the truth that the imperial edict ordering her grandfather to kill himself was issued by the corrupt eunuch Wang Zhen, who controls the Ming government. Concurrently, she reunites with her long-lost brother Yun Zhong, who is bent on carrying out their grandfather's dying wish to kill the Zhangs. Yun Lei is torn between loyalty to her family and her growing affection for Zhang Danfeng.

Meanwhile, Zhang Danfeng embarks on a quest to recover treasure hidden by his ancestor Zhang Shicheng, and gets into a confrontation with multiple factions who are after the treasure. He teams up with Yun Lei to defeat their enemies, and secretly helps the wounded Yun Zhong recover, leading to a gradual reconciliation between their families.

When news arrives that Emperor Yingzong has been captured by the Oirats during the Tumu Crisis, Zhang Danfeng and his allies support the upright statesman Yu Qian in leading the defence of Beijing from an Oirat invasion.

In the aftermath of the crisis, Zhang Danfeng and his allies join diplomatic efforts to negotiate peace and secure the emperor's release. Zhang Zongzhou ultimately takes his own life to pay for what he did to Yun Jing, bringing closure to the longstanding feud between the two families and allowing Zhang Danfeng and Yun Lei to finally be together.

== Principal characters ==
- Zhang Danfeng (張丹楓) – Zhang Zongzhou's son and Xie Tianhua's apprentice.
- Yun Lei (雲蕾) – Yun Jing's granddaughter and Ye Yingying's apprentice.
- Yun Zhong (雲重) – Yun Lei's brother and Dong Yue's apprentice.
- Tantai Jingming (澹台鏡明) – a member of the Tantai family who has sworn allegiance to the Zhangs. She marries Yun Zhong, and their granddaughter Yun Hu is one of the main characters in Guangling Jian.
- Zhou Shanmin (周山民) – an outlaw leader and ally of the heroes.
- Shi Cuifeng (石翠鳳) – a member of the Shi family who has sworn allegiance to the Zhangs. She marries Zhou Shanmin, and their children Zhou Jianqin and Zhou Zhixia play important roles in the subsequent novels.
- Tuobuhua (脫不花) – Esen's daughter who has unrequited love for Zhang Danfeng.
- Yu Qian (于謙) – an upright, high-ranking official in the Ming government. His daughter Yu Chengzhu is Zhang Danfeng's apprentice and the protagonist of the sequel Sanhua Nüxia.
- Yun Jing (雲靖) – a Ming diplomat whose suicide marks the start of the feud between the Yun and Zhang families.
- Zhang Zongzhou (張宗周) – a descendant of Zhang Shicheng serving as a chancellor under the Oirats.
- Dong Yue (董岳), Chaoyin (潮音), Xie Tianhua (謝天華) and Ye Yingying (葉盈盈) – Chen Xuanji's apprentices who trained the main characters.
- Tantai Mieming (澹台滅明), Wu Mengfu (烏蒙夫) and Lin Xianyun (林仙韻) – Shangguan Tianye's apprentices who support the main characters in their struggles.
- Bi Daofan (畢道凡) – an influential wulin leader with connections to the Shaolin Sect and Beggar Clan who has sworn allegiance to the Zhangs.
- Zhang Fengfu (張風府) – a highly-skilled fighter who serves the Ming government and secretly helps the heroes. His son Zhang Yuhu is one of the main characters in Lianjian Fengyun Lu.
- Emperor Yingzong of Ming (明英宗) – the Ming emperor captured by the Oirats during the Tumu Crisis.
- Wang Zhen (王振) – a corrupt eunuch who controls the Ming government.
- Esen (也先) – the de facto leader of the Oirats.

== Reception and legacy ==
Pingzong Xiaying Lu is regarded as one of Liang Yusheng's significant works and a classic in modern wuxia fiction. Critical reference works praise the novel for its historical setting, romantic heroism, and intertwining of family, loyalty, and personal morality.

Zhang Danfeng, the protagonist, is highlighted as a "cultured swordsman" (文士型侠客) whose character balances loyalty and romance. Critics regard his development — particularly his decisions during crises — as reflective of Liang Yusheng's broader themes of moral conflict and social responsibility.

The novel's prose style is commended for its elegance, poetic prose, and classical allusion, and its ability to evoke historical events such as the Tumu Crisis and the characters' internal turmoil.

Among readers and in cultural memory, Pingzong Xiaying Lu has been well-received. On Douban, the 2012 edition received a rating of 7.8/10 from about 310 readers. The 1985 Hong Kong television series adapted from the novel has been cited by Liang Yusheng himself as his favourite among the novel's adaptations.

== Adaptations ==
=== Films ===
Year	Title	Production	Main cast
1963	Revenge of a Swordswoman	Shaw Brothers Studio (Hong Kong)	Betty Loh Ti, Zhao Lei

=== Television ===
Year	Title	Production	Main cast
1977	Chronicles of the Shadow Swordsman	CTV (Hong Kong)	Chen Qiang, Sharon Yeung
1985	Chronicles of the Shadow Swordsman	ATV (Hong Kong)	Damian Lau, Michelle Yim
2004	Heroic Legend	Mainland China	Huang Haibing, Fan Bingbing
2011	Tracking Knights Phantom	Mainland China	Pan Yueming, Dong Jie
