= Wudang Yijian =

1980 wuxia novel by Liang Yusheng

- Author: Liang Yusheng
- Original title: 武當一劍
- Language: Chinese
- Genre: Wuxia
- Set in: 17th-century China
- Publisher: Ta Kung Pao
- Publication date: 9 May 1980 – 2 August 1983
- Publication place: Hong Kong
- Media type: Print
- ISBN: 9787306043955

Wudang Yijian
- Traditional Chinese: 武當一劍
- Simplified Chinese: 武当一剑
- Literal meaning: First Sword of Wudang
Transcriptions
Standard Mandarin
- Hanyu Pinyin: Wǔ Dāng Yī Jiàn
Yue: Cantonese
- Jyutping: Mou^{5} Dong^{1} Jat^{1} Gim^{3}

Wudang Yijian (武當一劍), literally First Sword of Wudang, is a wuxia novel by Liang Yusheng. It was first published as a serial between 9 May 1980 and 2 August 1983 in the Hong Kong newspaper Ta Kung Pao. It was Liang Yusheng's final wuxia novel before his retirement. Unlike many of Liang Yusheng's earlier novels, Wudang Yijian is a self-contained story not connected to any of his preceding series. The novel is set in 17th-century China during the final years of the Ming dynasty and follows a young swordsman from the Wudang Sect as he navigates vengeance, loyalty, and moral conflict amidst the collapse of the dynasty.

== Publication history ==
Wudang Yijian was first published as a serial between 9 May 1980 and 2 August 1983 in the Hong Kong newspaper Ta Kung Pao. Subsequent reprints include a 1992 four-volume edition by China Drama Publishing House, a 1996 two-volume edition by Guangdong Travel and Tourism Press, a 2000 three-volume edition by Cosmos Books, and a 2012 two-volume edition by the Sun Yat-Sen University Press. The serialised version is related to the Tianshan series but the author removed nearly 300,000 Chinese characters and many recurring characters from the series to fix discrepancies with Baifa Monü Zhuan, which precedes it chronologically and makes it a standalone novel in its book publication.

== Plot summary ==
Set in 17th-century China towards the end of the Ming dynasty, the novel follows Geng Yujing, a swordsman of the Wudang Sect caught in a cycle of vengeance spanning two generations. 15 years ago, his father had been killed after being wrongly accused of murder, while his mother had committed suicide. He had been raised by foster parents and superficially trained in swordsmanship.

The Wudang Sect faces an internal crisis when its dying leader, Wuxiang, passes his position to the reputable swordsman Mou Canglang instead of one of his own juniors or apprentices. Wuxiang's passing also rekindles an old rivalry between the Wudang Sect and the Kunlun Sect. Three decades ago, Wuxiang won a duel against a Kunlun swordsman, whose apprentice Xiang Tianming has since sworn to avenge his master's defeat. Geng Yujing is secretly entrusted with a highly coveted Wudang swordplay manual, and then sent to meet the Shaolin monk Huike, setting him unknowingly on a path to improve his swordsmanship and uncover his past.

During his journey, Geng Yujing learns from Huike about a legendary fraternity known as the "Five Young Gallants", whose friendship had dissolved amidst betrayal and ambition. Their tangled history also proves to be at the heart of a series of unresolved murders and the tragedy that destroyed the Geng family. As Geng Yujing gradually unravels the mysteries, he vows to seek justice for the victims and his parents.

Upon attaining a higher level of mastery in swordsmanship, Geng Yujing returns to the Wudang Sect to represent them in the long-awaited duel against the Kunlun Sect, defeating Xiang Tianming and shooting to fame in the wulin. After the duel, the culprits behind the murders reveal themselves to be the two surviving members of the "Five Young Gallants" who were driven by jealousy and vengeance. Their deaths, along with those of others involved in the conflict, finally bring an end to years of bloodshed.

In the aftermath, Geng Yujing injures the Later Jin ruler Nurhaci at the Battle of Ningyuan, temporarily halting the Later Jin invasion and earning himself the nickname "First Sword of Wudang".

== Principal characters ==
- Geng Yujing (耿玉京) / Lan Yujing (藍玉京) – the titular protagonist and a Wudang swordsman.
- Ximen Yan (西門燕) – Geng Yujing's romantic partner, and the daughter of Yin Mingzhu and Mou Canglang.
- Dongfang Liang (東方亮) – a Kunlun swordsman and Ximen Yan's maternal cousin.
- Mou Yiyu (牟一羽) – Mou Canglang and Yin Mingzhu's son who succeeds his father as the Wudang Sect's leader.
- Lan Shuiling (藍水靈) – Geng Yujing's foster sister and a Wudang swordswoman.
- Ge Zhenjun (戈振軍) / Buqi (不歧) – Geng Yujing's godfather and a Wudang swordsman.
- Mou Canglang (牟滄浪) – a famous swordsman from Zhongzhou who becomes the Wudang Sect's leader.
- Yin Mingzhu (殷明珠) – Ximen Mu's wife who had an affair with Mou Canglang.
- Surviving members of the "Five Young Gallants" (小五義):
  - Wang Huiwen (王晦聞) – a Later Jin spy who infiltrates the Wudang Sect by pretending to be deaf and mute.
  - Ximen Mu (西門牧) – a Kunlun swordsman who fakes his death to take revenge against Mou Canglang.
  - Huike (慧可) – a Shaolin monk who accompanies Geng Yujing on his quest to uncover the past.
- Xiang Tianming (向天明) – a formidable Kunlun swordsman who trained Dongfang Liang.
- Wuxiang (無相) – the leader of the Wudang Sect.
- Geng Jingshi (耿京士) and He Yuyan (何玉燕) – Geng Yujing's parents.

== Reception and legacy ==
Wudang Yijian is regarded by critics as the final summation of Liang Yusheng's career and a key example of his writing style in the later or "mature" phase of his career. Commentators note that the novel departs from the romantic idealism of his early works, instead presenting a more philosophical and psychologically complex vision of the wulin.

Scholars have identified three major areas of innovation in the novel's structure and theme: a multi-layered plot centred on a 15-year-old mystery; the moral ambiguity of its characters who often embody both virtue and weakness; and the fusion of Taoist and Zhuangzian philosophy with swordsmanship.

== Adaptations ==
In 2021, the novel was adapted into a Chinese television series First Sword of Wudang produced by Hubei Television and others, starring Yu Feifan, Chai Biyun, Zhou Hang, Sun Jiayu, Ma Xiaowei, Song Jialun, Wei Lisi, Shan Sihan, Lin Yiting, Yvonne Yung, Jiang Hongbo, and Theresa Fu.
