= Longhu Dou Jinghua =

1954 wuxia novel by Liang Yusheng

- Author: Liang Yusheng
- Original title: 龍虎鬥京華
- Language: Chinese
- Genre: Wuxia
- Set in: 20th-century China
- Publisher: New Evening Post
- Publication date: 20 January 1954 – 1 August 1954
- Publication place: Hong Kong
- Media type: Print
- ISBN: 9789622578753
- Followed by: Caomang Longshe Zhuan

Longhu Dou Jinghua
- Traditional Chinese: 龍虎鬥京華
- Simplified Chinese: 龙虎斗京华
- Literal meaning: Clash of Dragon and Tiger in the Capital
Transcriptions
Standard Mandarin
- Hanyu Pinyin: Lóng Hǔ Dòu Jīng Huá
Yue: Cantonese
- Jyutping: Lung^{4} Fu^{2} Dau^{3} Ging^{1} Waa^{4}

Longhu Dou Jinghua (龍虎鬥京華), literally Clash of Dragon and Tiger in the Capital, is a wuxia novel by Liang Yusheng. It was first published as a serial between 20 January and 1 August 1954 in the Hong Kong newspaper New Evening Post. Set in China during the late Qing dynasty against the backdrop of the Boxer Rebellion (1899–1901), it follows rival martial artists caught between loyalty, betrayal, and national crisis.

The novel is regarded as Liang Yusheng's debut in the wuxia genre and is often cited as the starting point of the "new school" of wuxia fiction that emerged in Hong Kong in the 1950s which marked a shift towards more complex characterisation and historical realism. A companion piece, Caomang Longshe Zhuan, was published as a serial in the New Evening Post between 1954 and 1955.

== Background ==
In January 1954, a high-profile lei tai match took place in Macau between Chan Hak-fu of the White Crane School and Wu Gongyi of the Taiji School. The match garnered significant attention in Macau and Hong Kong. Liang Yusheng, who was writing for the New Evening Post at the time, was encouraged by the newspaper's chief editor, Luo Fu, to take advantage of the sensationalism surrounding the match to write a wuxia story. This story was then published as a serial under the title Longhu Dou Jinghua.

== Publication history ==
Longhu Dou Jinghua was first published as a serial between 20 January and 1 August 1954 in the Hong Kong newspaper New Evening Post. Subsequent reprints include a 1989 two-volume edition by China Folk Literature and Art Publishing House, a 1996 edition by Cosmos Books, another 1996 edition by Guangdong Travel and Tourism Press, and a 2012 edition by the Sun Yat-Sen University Press.

== Plot summary ==
The novel is set in China during the late Qing dynasty against the backdrop of the Boxer Rebellion between 1899 and 1901. Ding Jianming, the master of the Taiji School in Baoding, forms a partnership with Suo Shanyu, a corrupt government official. His fellow martial artists in the wulin despise him for that and regard him with hostility.

Liu Jianyin, a senior member of the Taiji School, comes out of retirement to resolve a conflict between Ding Jianming and other martial artists. Afterwards, Ding Jianming is betrayed and murdered by Suo Shanyu, while Liu Jianyin joins the Boxers along with his daughter Liu Mengdie and his apprentices Lou Wuwei and Zuo Hanying.

In Beijing, the Boxers are divided into factions, each with differing views on whether to support or oppose the Qing government. Yue Qunxiong, the leader of the pro-government faction, turns against the other Boxers and starts an internal conflict among the Boxers which leads to the deaths of Liu Jianyin and Zuo Hanying.

To avenge their loved ones, Liu Mengdie and Lou Wuwei challenge Yue Qunxiong to a lei tai match according to wulin rules, with both sides recruiting highly-skilled martial artists to support them. The match is interrupted by the invasion of the Eight-Nation Alliance, which occupies Beijing and forces the Qing government to sign the Boxer Protocol.

In the years that follow, Liu Mengdie becomes a Buddhist nun. After much personal turmoil, she eventually avenges her father and kills Yue Qunxiong.

== Principal characters ==
- Liu Jianyin (柳劍吟) – a senior member of the Taiji School who joins the Boxers.
- Liu Mengdie (柳夢蝶) – Liu Jianyin's daughter.
- Lou Wuwei (婁無畏) – Liu Jianyin's first apprentice.
- Zuo Hanying (左含英) – Liu Jianyin's third apprentice.
- Ding Jianming (丁劍鳴) – Liu Jianyin's junior and the Ding-style Taiji School's master.
- Yue Qunxiong (岳君雄) – a Boxer leader who supports the Qing government.
- Ding Xiao (丁曉) – Ding Jianming's son and successor.

== Reception and legacy ==
Longhu Dou Jinghua is Liang Yusheng's debut in the wuxia genre and is considered the starting point of the "new school" of wuxia literature that emerged in Hong Kong in the mid-1950s. According to literary scholar Stephen Teo, it was among the first Hong Kong serialised wuxia novels to blend historical events with martial-arts elements, as well as emphasise moral ambiguity and psychological realism over simple heroic adventure.

Contemporary reports describe the serial as a success following the 1954 lei tai match in Macau that inspired its writing. Reader correspondence during its eight-month run in Hong Kong encouraged its continuation and raised Liang Yusheng's profile in Hong Kong literary circles.

Modern literary histories cite the novel for its use of the Boxer Rebellion setting, its intertwining of personal and political themes, and its early articulation of the "new school" ethos that came to characterise 20th-century wuxia fiction.
