= Sanhua Nüxia =

1960 wuxia novel by Liang Yusheng

- Author: Liang Yusheng
- Original title: 散花女俠
- Language: Chinese
- Genre: Wuxia
- Set in: 15th-century China
- Publisher: Ta Kung Pao
- Publication date: 23 February 1960 – 22 June 1961
- Publication place: Hong Kong
- Media type: Print
- ISBN: 9786263755147
- Preceded by: Pingzong Xiaying Lu
- Followed by: Lianjian Fengyun Lu

Sanhua Nüxia
- Traditional Chinese: 散花女俠
- Simplified Chinese: 散花女侠
- Literal meaning: The Blossom-Scattering Heroine
Transcriptions
Standard Mandarin
- Hanyu Pinyin: Sǎn Huā Nǚ Xiá
Yue: Cantonese
- Jyutping: Saan^{3} Faa^{1} Neoi^{5} Hap^{6}

Sanhua Nüxia (散花女俠), literally The Blossom-Scattering Heroine, is a wuxia novel by Liang Yusheng. It was first published as a serial between 23 February 1960 and 22 June 1961 in the Hong Kong newspaper Ta Kung Pao. It is the third instalment in the Pingzong series, preceded by Pingzong Xiaying Lu and followed by Lianjian Fengyun Lu.

Set in mid-15th century China during the Ming dynasty, the novel follows the adventures of the titular heroine Yu Chengzhu, a fictional daughter of the historical statesman Yu Qian. Trained in swordsmanship by Zhang Danfeng (the protagonist of Pingzong Xiaying Lu), Yu Chengzhu gets involved in the struggles of the wulin amidst political turmoil. Several characters from the earlier novels reappear in Sanhua Nüxia, and its own characters continue into the later novels of the Pingzong series.

== Publication history ==
Sanhua Nüxia was first published as a serial between 23 February 1960 and 22 June 1961 in the Hong Kong newspaper Ta Kung Pao. Subsequent reprints include a 1988 two-volume edition by China Folk Literature and Art Publishing House, a 1988 edition by Hunan People's Publishing House, 1993 and 1995 two-volume editions by Cosmos Books, a 1996 edition by Guangdong Travel and Tourism Press, and a 2012 two-volume edition by the Sun Yat-Sen University Press.

== Plot summary ==
The story takes place in 15th-century China following the Tumu Crisis between the Ming dynasty and Oirats. Emperor Yingzong has seized back power in a palace coup and started persecuting those who supported his predecessor. Among the victims is the loyal statesman Yu Qian, who is falsely accused of treason and executed.

Yu Qian's daughter, Yu Chengzhu, was trained in swordsmanship by Zhang Danfeng, the protagonist of the previous novel. While seeking justice for her father, she encounters Bi Qingtian, a Beggar Clan regional chief who earns her gratitude for honouring her father with a proper burial. Later, acting on her master's instruction, she joins a coastal militia in Zhejiang led by Ye Zongliu to resist incursions by the wokou. There, she befriends the swordsman Tie Jingxin.

After the militia's victory over the wokou, Yu Chengzhu travels to Yunnan to find Zhang Danfeng. Along the way, she befriends Duan Chengcang, a descendant of the Dali Kingdom's royal family, and starts a romantic relationship with Ye Chenglin, Ye Zongliu's nephew. She also clashes with the swordsman Yang Zonghai, who serves the Ming government and whose actions drive much of the mid-novel tension. Meanwhile, Tie Jingxin falls in love with the noblewoman Mu Yan.

While returning east, Yu Chengzhu and Ye Chenglin befriend Ling Yunfeng, a swordswoman from Mount Heaven searching for her lover, Huo Tiandu. At a major wulin gathering, Bi Qingtian attempts to incite a rebellion against the Ming government, but his relations with Zhang Danfeng and other wulin figures turn sour when they oppose his plan. Zhang Danfeng heads to Beijing while Yu Chengzhu continues her journey through Hangzhou, where she witnesses Tie Jingxin apparently pledging allegiance to the Ming government.

Ming government forces eventually turn on Bi Qingtian despite granting him amnesty earlier after his surrender. Heavily wounded and betrayed, Bi Qingtian is saved by Zhang Danfeng but loses his martial prowess. Meanwhile, Tie Jingxin is revealed to be working undercover in the Ming government, and he sacrifices himself to save his wulin allies. The conflicts culminate in the reconciliation of the surviving heroes: Ling Yunfeng reunites with Huo Tiandu; Yu Chengzhu and Ye Chenglin get engaged; and Tie Jingxin marries Mu Yan.

== Principal characters ==
- Yu Chengzhu (于承珠) – the titular protagonist and Yu Qian's daughter who was trained in swordsmanship by Zhang Danfeng.
- Ye Chenglin (葉成林) – Ye Zongliu's nephew who was trained in swordsmanship by Dong Yue's apprentice.
- Tie Jingxin (鐵鏡心) – the son of former Taizhou governor Tie Hong (鐵鈜). He was trained by Shi Jingtao (石驚濤), one of the top four swordsmen in the wulin, but has fallen out with his master.
- Mu Yan (沐燕) – a noblewoman in Yunnan whose ancestor was Mu Ying. She eventually marries Tie Jingxin.
- Duan Chengcang (段澄蒼) – a descendant of the Dali Kingdom's royal family who has married a Persian princess, and is considered the finest swordsman in Persia.
- Zhang Danfeng (張丹楓) – one of the top four swordsmen in the wulin. He and his wife Yun Lei (雲蕾) support and mentor the next generation of heroes.
- Ling Yunfeng (凌雲鳳) – the leader of an outlaw band in Jiangxi who supports the heroes.
- Huo Tiandu (霍天都) – Ling Yunfeng's lover and a highly-skilled swordsman from Mount Heaven who helps the heroes.
- Bi Qingtian (畢擎天) – the primary antagonist and Bi Daofan's son. A prominent wulin leader in northern China, he also serves as a regional chief of the Beggar Clan.
- Yang Zonghai (陽宗海) – one of the main antagonists. He is one of the top four swordsmen in the wulin but has chosen to serve the Ming government as director of palace affairs.
- Zhou Shanmin (周山民) and Shi Cuifeng (石翠鳳) – a couple who lead an outlaw band supporting the coastal militia.

== Reception and legacy ==
On Douban, the novel holds a rating of 6.8 out of 10 from over 500 readers, with many praising Liang Yusheng's elegant writing, use of poetry, and classical allusion. However, some critics point out that the plotting and combat segments are less compelling compared to other wuxia novels.

In a 2022 article on Sohu, Sanhua Nüxia is described as having a "clean, artistic style", attributing part of its distinctiveness to the female protagonist Yu Chengzhu, unlike the traditional male-led wuxia stories.

A review in Ming Pao Monthly of Liang Yusheng's works notes that Sanhua Nüxia, along with Huanjian Qiqing Lu and Lianjian Fengyun Lu, maintains Liang Yusheng's established writing style but lacks a breakthrough.

== Adaptations ==
In 1961, the novel was adapted into a two-part Hong Kong film Heroine of Flower produced by the Tai Shing Film Company, starring Ng Kwun-Lai, Walter Tso and Bowie Wu. The second part credits Liang Yusheng as the screenwriter.
