= Huanjian Lingqi =

1980 wuxia novel by Liang Yusheng

- Author: Liang Yusheng
- Original title: 幻劍靈旗
- Language: Chinese
- Genre: Wuxia
- Set in: 18th-century China
- Publisher: Ta Kung Pao
- Publication date: 27 January 1980 – March 1981
- Publication place: Hong Kong
- Media type: Print
- ISBN: 9786263755659
- Preceded by: Jianwang Chensi

Huanjian Lingqi
- Traditional Chinese: 幻劍靈旗
- Simplified Chinese: 幻剑灵旗
- Literal meaning: The Phantom Sword and the Spirit Banner
Transcriptions
Standard Mandarin
- Hanyu Pinyin: Huàn Jiàn Líng Qí
Yue: Cantonese
- Jyutping: Waan^{6} Gim^{3} Ling^{4} Kei^{4}

Huanjian Lingqi (幻劍靈旗), literally The Phantom Sword and the Spirit Banner, is a wuxia novel by Liang Yusheng. It was first published as a serial between 27 January 1980 and March 1981 in the Hong Kong newspaper Ta Kung Pao. A sequel to Jianwang Chensi, it continues many of the same characters and unresolved plot threads from the first novel. The two novels were originally one continuous serial before they were republished separately.

== Publication history ==
Huanjian Lingqi was first published as a serial between 27 January 1980 and March 1981 in the Hong Kong newspaper Ta Kung Pao. Subsequent reprints include a 1988 edition by Kunlun Publishing House, 1994 and 2000 two-volume editions by Cosmos Books, a 1996 edition by Guangdong Travel and Tourism Press, and a 2012 two-volume edition by the Sun Yat-Sen University Press.

== Plot summary ==
The story is set in 18th-century China during the Qing dynasty, picking up the threads left unresolved at the end of the previous novel. Qi Leming, crippled and burdened by past betrayals, attempts to withdraw from the wulin with Mu Juanjuan. When enemies pursue them, he is drawn back into conflict, forced to face both old wounds and new schemes.

Wei Tianyuan continues his quest to avenge his father by slaying Xu Zhongyue, and grapples with emotional turmoil after the apparent death of his childhood sweetheart, Jiang Xuejun. Meanwhile, Shangguan Feifeng emerges as a key strategist: she helps to orchestrate events like Jiang Xuejun's "death", intervenes in conspiracies, and mediates romantic rivalries among the main characters.

At the same time, antagonistic forces – including the Yuwen family and their allies in the Qing government – reveal plots to destabilise a wulin alliance in the Western Regions, and exploit an old rivalry between the alliance leader Shangguan Yunlong and the swordsman Qi Yanran. As the conspiracy grows, Wei Tianyuan, Chu Tianshu, Qi Shuyu, and others band together to prevent bloodshed. Emotional crises — betrayal, loyalty, sacrifice — intersect with duels and intrigue. Key mysteries from the earlier novel are clarified, including false identities and hidden betrayals.

By the story's end, Jiang Xuejun survives but chooses a spiritual path as a Buddhist nun. Wei Tianyuan accepts Shangguan Feifeng's love; Qi Leming achieves reconciliation with his estranged family members but remains scarred by past suffering. The major antagonists' plots are exposed and defeated, restoring a fragile order to the wulin. Many of the novel's earlier mysteries are resolved, though some emotional echoes and regrets linger, giving the conclusion both closure and a sense of inevitable cost.

== Principal characters ==
- Wei Tianyuan (衛天元) – Qi Yanran's apprentice.
- Shangguan Feifeng (上官飛鳳) – Shangguan Yunlong's daughter and Wei Tianyuan's lover.
- Chu Tianshu (楚天舒) – Chu Jinsong's son and Wei Tianyuan's ally.
- Qi Shuyu (齊漱玉) – Qi Yanran's granddaughter and Wei Tianyuan's ally.
- Jiang Xuejun (姜雪君) – Wei Tianyuan's ex-lover who becomes a Buddhist nun.
- Qi Leming (齊勒銘) – Qi Yanran's son and Qi Shuyu's father who has reformed.
- Mu Juanjuan (穆娟娟) – Qi Leming's lover.
- Qi Yanran (齊燕然) – one of the top three swordsmen in the wulin.
- Shangguan Yunlong (上官雲龍) – the leader of the 13-sect wulin alliance in the Western Regions.
- Mu Haohao (穆好好) – Mu Juanjuan's sister and Yuwen Lei's wife.
- Yuwen Lei (宇文雷) – the head of the Yuwen family.

== Reception and legacy ==
Contemporary and later commentary treat Huanjian Lingqi and Jianwang Chensi as part of Liang Yusheng's works from the later or "mature" phase of his writing career, during which he actively experimented with style and theme. Scholars and critics note three recurrent points. First, the two volumes are frequently discussed as a single piece that was later divided into two parts for publication. Several commentators observe that the serial originally ran as a continuous narrative and that the later two-part arrangement affects readers' sense of pacing. Second, literary critics identify the novels as examples of Liang Yusheng's stylistic shift in his writing career: he experiments with denser plotting, multiple viewpoints, detective-like mystery elements, and a more ambiguous moral palette compared to his earlier works. Third, reader reviews praise Liang Yusheng's use of prose, classical allusions, and the novel's emotional depth, while criticising the novel for its uneven pacing, overly complex plot, and wide range of characters. Online reader pages mention that the novels contain memorable characterisation — especially of morally grey figures such as Qi Leming and Shangguan Feifeng — but also that the serial's division and some editorial cuts have contributed to perceived structural weaknesses.
