= Huanjian Qiqing Lu =

1959 wuxia novel by Liang Yusheng

- Author: Liang Yusheng
- Original title: 還劍奇情錄
- Language: Chinese
- Genre: Wuxia
- Set in: 15th-century China
- Publisher: Hong Kong Commercial Daily
- Publication date: November 1959 – May 1960
- Publication place: Hong Kong
- Media type: Print
- ISBN: 9789575697280
- Followed by: Pingzong Xiaying Lu

Huanjian Qiqing Lu
- Traditional Chinese: 還劍奇情錄
- Simplified Chinese: 还剑奇情录
- Literal meaning: Tale of the Sword Returned and the Unusual Romance
Transcriptions
Standard Mandarin
- Hanyu Pinyin: Huán Jiàn Qí Qíng Lù
Yue: Cantonese
- Jyutping: Waan^{4} Gim^{3} Kei^{4} Ching^{4} Luk^{6}

Huanjian Qiqing Lu (還劍奇情錄), literally Tale of the Sword Returned and the Unusual Romance, is a wuxia novel by Liang Yusheng, first published as a serial between November 1959 and May 1960 in the Hong Kong newspaper Hong Kong Commercial Daily. It is the first instalment in Liang Yusheng's Pingzong series, followed by Pingzong Xiaying Lu.

The novel has been described as a "wuxia adaptation" of the 1933 play Thunderstorm by Cao Yu. Set in early 15th-century China, it centres on a swordsman who abandons his pregnant first wife and later manipulates his second wife into helping him steal a coveted swordplay manual. Two decades later, his past returns to haunt him when the children from both marriages fall in love, unaware they are half-siblings, leading to a tragedy that destroys his family.

== Publication history ==
Huanjian Qiqing Lu was first published as a serial between November 1959 and May 1960 in the Hong Kong newspaper Hong Kong Commercial Daily. Subsequent reprints include a 1988 edition by China Agricultural Publishing House, a 1996 edition by Cosmos Books, a 1996 edition (combined with Bingpo Hanguang Jian) by Guangdong Travel and Tourism Press, a 2012 edition by the Sun Yat-Sen University Press, and a 2016 edition by Brain Master Publishing.

== Plot summary ==
The story is set in 15th-century China during the Ming dynasty. Chen Xuanji, a young swordsman, is on a mission to assassinate Yun Wuyang, a legendary swordsman who has withdrawn from the wulin. Along the way, he gets entangled in a love triangle with Xiao Yunlan, who has a crush on him, and Shangguan Tianye, a Wudang swordsman who loves Xiao Yunlan.

By chance, Chen Xuanji meets and starts a romance with Yun Susu, Yun Wuyang's daughter. At the Yun residence, confrontations take place between Yun Wuyang and other wulin figures over a swordplay manual which Yun Wuyang had apparently stolen from the Wudang Sect years ago. Yun Wuyang's health subsequently declines after he engages them in a series of duels.

Chen Xuanji is forced to take shelter in the Yun residence after being attacked by the jinyiwei. Yun Wuyang is mortally wounded while protecting Chen Xuanji, whom he knows his daughter truly loves. As death approaches Yun Wuyang, the truth of his life emerges. Years earlier, he had abandoned his first wife Chen Xuemei, who was then pregnant, after she was wounded in battle.

Chen Xuemei, who has survived and given birth to Chen Xuanji, appears at the Yun residence in search of her son. The ultimate revelation that Chen Xuanji and Yun Susu are half-siblings drives Yun Wuyang to a fatal heart attack and causes Chen Xuemei to faint. Overcome by despair upon learning that the man she loves is actually her half-brother, Yun Susu commits suicide, leaving Chen Xuanji to mourn.

== Principal characters ==
- Chen Xuanji (陳玄機) – a swordsman who is Chen Xuemei and Yun Wuyang's son. His apprentices trained the main characters in the sequel Pingzong Xiaying Lu, linking this novel to the rest of the Pingzong series.
- Yun Susu (雲素素) – Yun Wuyang and Mou Baozhu's daughter.
- Shangguan Tianye (上官天野) – a Wudang Sect swordsman who later becomes Bi Lingfeng's apprentice.
- Xiao Yunlan (蕭韻蘭) – Xiao Guanying's daughter who has a crush on Chen Xuanji.
- Yun Wuyang (雲舞陽) – a legendary swordsman who used to serve under the warlord Zhang Shicheng.
- Mou Baozhu (牟寶珠) – Yun Wuyang's second wife who had stolen the swordplay manual from the Wudang Sect for him.
- Chen Xuemei (陳雪梅) – Yun Wuyang's first wife whom Yun had abandoned.
- Bi Lingfeng (畢凌風) – a crippled and disfigured outlaw who appears as a beggar.
- Xiao Guanying (蕭冠英) – a prominent wulin leader who has a grudge against Yun Wuyang.

== Reception and legacy ==
Readers and critics generally regard Huanjian Qiqing Lu as one of Liang Yusheng's more concise and tightly-structured novels. On Douban, the novel holds a rating of 7.3 out of 10 based on around 50 reviews, with readers praising its poetic prose and tragic emotional tone. A 2019 article on Sohu described it as a compact and well-constructed story that effectively introduces the Pingzong series by combining elements of romance, martial-arts chivalry, and moral reflection.

Reader commentaries have pointed out the novel's exploration of guilt, retribution, and intergenerational tragedy, with some comparing its plot to the 1933 play Thunderstorm by Cao Yu.

Huanjian Qiqing Lu is also regarded as significant in tracing Liang Yusheng's development as a wuxia writer.

== Adaptations ==
In 1986, the novel was adapted into the Chinese film The Unusual Love When Returning the Sword, produced by Pearl River Film Studio and directed by Hong Ping, starring Wang Yu, Zheng Hui, Wang Xinwu, and Tan Yuanyuan.
