= Caomang Longshe Zhuan =

1954 wuxia novel by Liang Yusheng

- Author: Liang Yusheng
- Original title: 草莽龍蛇傳
- Language: Chinese
- Genre: Wuxia
- Set in: 20th-century China
- Publisher: New Evening Post
- Publication date: 11 August 1954 – 5 February 1955
- Publication place: Hong Kong
- Media type: Print
- ISBN: 9787306041883
- Preceded by: Longhu Dou Jinghua

Caomang Longshe Zhuan
- Traditional Chinese: 草莽龍蛇傳
- Simplified Chinese: 草莽龙蛇传
- Literal meaning: Chronicle of Dragons and Serpents among the Common Folk
Transcriptions
Standard Mandarin
- Hanyu Pinyin: Cáo Mǎng Lóng Shé Zhuàn
Yue: Cantonese
- Jyutping: Cou^{2} Mong^{5} Lung^{4} Se^{4} Cyun^{4}

Caomang Longshe Zhuan (草莽龍蛇傳), literally Chronicle of Dragons and Serpents among the Common Folk, is a wuxia novel by Liang Yusheng. It was first published as a serial between 11 August 1954 and 5 February 1955 in the Hong Kong newspaper New Evening Post. It also serves as a companion piece to Liang Yusheng's debut wuxia novel Longhu Dou Jinghua by expanding on the backstories of existing characters while introducing new figures and narrative threads.

== Publication history ==
Caomang Longshe Zhuan was first published as a serial between 11 August 1954 and 5 February 1955 in the Hong Kong newspaper New Evening Post. Subsequent reprints include a 1986 edition by North Literature and Art Publishing House, a 1996 edition by Cosmos Books, another 1996 edition by Guangdong Travel and Tourism Press, and a 2012 edition by the Sun Yat-Sen University Press.

== Plot summary ==
The story is set in China during the late Qing dynasty around the turn of the 20th century. Ding Xiao, the son of Ding Jianming – the master of the Ding-style Taiji School in Baoding – struggles with his father's estrangement from fellow martial artists in the wulin due to his father's partnership with a corrupt government official, Suo Shanyu.

Ding Xiao meets Jiang Fengqiong, the granddaughter of Meihuaquan master Jiang Yixian, and falls in love with her after resolving an earlier misunderstanding. During this time, he also gets acquainted with Zhu Hongdeng, the founder of the Boxer movement. Eventually, with Jiang Fengqiong and Zhu Hongdeng's support, he runs away from home in protest against an arranged marriage imposed by his father.

After leaving home, Ding Xiao travels around, aspiring to reconcile the Ding- and Chen-style Taiji Schools and promote the martial art. With some help, he convinces the Chen-style Taiji School of his sincerity and learns from them, fulfilling his wish. Meanwhile, Ding Jianming is betrayed and murdered by Suo Shanyu.

Upon completing his training, Ding Xiao initially intends to join the Boxers, but chooses to return to Baoding to succeed his father as master of the Ding-style Taiji School. When Jiang Yixian gets into trouble with the Qing government, Ding Xiao helps him escape and relocate to northwestern China. In the meantime, Zhu Hongdeng has fallen in battle, leaving Ding Xiao and his companions to find his designated successor, Li Laizhong.

On the way to northwestern China, Ding Xiao saves Jiang Yixian, who is under attack by his enemies. The elderly master exhausts himself while fending off the attackers, and uses his final breath to bless the union of Jiang Fengqiong and Ding Xiao, who are eventually married. On their return journey, Ding Xiao encounters Suo Shanyu and seizes the opportunity to kill him and avenge his father.

== Principal characters ==
- Ding Xiao (丁曉) – Ding Jianming's son and a Taiji master.
- Jiang Fengqiong (姜鳳瓊) – Jiang Yixian's granddaughter and Ding Xiao's wife.
- Zhu Hongdeng (朱紅燈) – Jiang Yixian's apprentice and the Boxer movement's founder.
- Ding Jianming (丁劍鳴) – the master of the Ding-style Taiji School in Baoding.
- Jiang Yixian (姜翼賢) – a Meihuaquan master in Baoding.
- Chen Yongchuan (陳永傳) – a Chen-style Taiji master.
- Suo Shanyu (索善余) – a corrupt former official and wealthy landlord in Baoding.

== Reception and legacy ==
Caomang Longshe Zhuan is part of Liang Yusheng's early wuxia works and a companion piece to his debut, Longhu Dou Jinghua. Literary surveys cite it as one of his works that defined his writing style in the 1950s – a mix of historical elements, emotional conflict, and martial arts – that gave rise to a "new school" of the wuxia genre in Hong Kong in the 1950s.

Among readers, Caomang Longshe Zhuan receives moderate but generally positive reception. On Douban, it has an average rating of about 6.1/10 from over 200 ratings. Some readers praise Liang Yusheng's literary style — particularly his use of classical allusion, poetic prose, and historical setting — while others view the novel as less dramatic or less developed in characterisation compared to his later works.

Caomang Longshe Zhuan is credited for extending Longhu Dou Jinghua, particularly by fleshing out the younger characters' moral development and including more nuanced emotional and relational dynamics among the key characters. The novel's emphasis on conflicting loyalties, romantic subplots, and the tension between tradition and personal desire, is seen as foreshadowing the themes that Liang Yusheng adopted in his later works.
