= Liang Yusheng =

Chinese writer; 1924-2009

Chen Wentong
- Born: 5 April 1924; Mengshan County, Guangxi Province, Republic of China
- Died: 22 January 2009 (aged 84); Sydney, New South Wales, Australia
- Citizenship: Australia
- Occupation: Novelist
- Writing career
- Pen name: Liang Yusheng
- Genre: Wuxia
- Notable work: see below

Chinese name
- Chinese: 梁羽生
Transcriptions
Standard Mandarin
- Hanyu Pinyin: Liáng Yǔshēng
Yue: Cantonese
- Jyutping: Loeng^{4} Jyu^{5}-sang^{1}

Chen Wentong
- Traditional Chinese: 陳文統
- Simplified Chinese: 陈文统
Transcriptions
Standard Mandarin
- Hanyu Pinyin: Chén Wéntǒng
Yue: Cantonese
- Jyutping: Can^{4} Man^{4}-tung^{2}

Chen Wentong (5 April 1924 – 22 January 2009), better known by his pen name Liang Yusheng, was a Chinese-born Australian novelist best known for being a pioneer of the "new school" of the wuxia genre in the 20th century. Along with Jin Yong and Gu Long, he was one of the best known wuxia writers in the later half of the 20th century. Throughout his career, he published a total of 35 wuxia novels. The more notable ones include Baifa Monü Zhuan, Yunhai Yugong Yuan, Qijian Xia Tianshan and Pingzong Xiaying Lu. Some of them have been adapted into films and television series, including The Bride with White Hair (1993) and Seven Swords (2005).

== Pen name ==
Chen's given name "Wentong" means "literary tradition". He chose Liang as the surname of his pen name to remind himself that he was inheriting the literary tradition of his ancestors in the same way the Chen dynasty (557–589) succeeded the Liang dynasty (502–557) during the Northern and Southern dynasties period (420–589). He chose "Yusheng" as the given name of his pen name to pay homage to Gong Baiyu, one of his favourite wuxia writers and sources of influence, because "Yusheng" means "born from (Gong Bai)yu".

== Early life ==
Chen was born in 1924 in a scholarly family in Tunzhi Village, Wenyu Town, Mengshan County, Guangxi Province in Republican China. His father, Chen Xinyu (陳信玉; born 1896), was a member of the local scholar-gentry who used his knowledge of traditional Chinese medicine to treat the locals. Chen himself was well-versed in the Chinese classics and duilian, being able to recite the Three Hundred Tang Poems by the age of eight. While he was attending Guilin High School in Guilin, he enjoyed writing poems.

Following the outbreak of the Second Sino-Japanese War in 1937, Chen left Guilin and returned to Mengshan County. During this time, he met two scholars from the neighbouring Guangdong Province who had taken shelter in Mengshan County, and studied history and literature under their tutelage: Jian Youwen, who specialised in the history of the Taiping Rebellion; and Rao Zongyi, who was well read in poetry, humanities, art and the history of Dunhuang.

After the war ended, Chen attended Lingnan University in Guangzhou and graduated in 1948, majoring in international economics.

== Career in Hong Kong ==
After the Chinese Communist Party came to power in 1949, Chen moved to Hong Kong and, through a recommendation from Lingnan University, became an assistant editor for the newspaper Ta Kung Pao. He was subsequently promoted to editor and became a member of the newspaper's editorial executive committee.

In 1950, when the Chinese Communist Party launched the Campaign to Suppress Counterrevolutionaries in mainland China, Chen's father was arrested and imprisoned after being accused of being a landlord under the Five Black Categories. When Chen heard that his father was in trouble, he rushed back to Mengshan County in an attempt to save his father. Along the way, he met his former classmate Peng Yingkang (彭榮康), who told him about the ongoing Campaign to Suppress Counterrevolutionaries. At the same time, he received a letter from his family warning him not to return home, so he headed back to Hong Kong. Chen's father was subsequently executed by the Communist government.

Towards the end of 1950, Chen was reassigned to New Evening Post, the evening edition of Ta Kung Pao.

On 17 January 1954, two martial arts masters – Chan Hak-fu of the White Crane School and Wu Gongyi of the Tai Chi School – challenged each other to a lei tai match in Macau and attracted much attention in Hong Kong. Luo Fu, the chief editor of New Evening Post, wanted to take advantage of the sensationalism surrounding the lei tai match, so he asked Chen to write a wuxia story inspired by the match and publish it as a serial in the newspaper. This became Chen's debut wuxia novel – Longhu Dou Jinghua – and marked the start of a "new school" wuxia genre. During this time, Chen met Jin Yong, who was also working at New Evening Post and writing wuxia novels.

From 1954 to 1983, Chen wrote a total of 35 wuxia novels, of which most were originally published as serials in newspapers. Among his works, Baifa Monü Zhuan, Yunhai Yugong Yuan, Qijian Xia Tianshan and Pingzong Xiaying Lu are some of the better known ones and have been adapted into films and television series, including The Bride with White Hair (1993) and Seven Swords (2005). Besides wuxia novels, Chen also wrote columns, critiques and essays under different pen names, including "Liang Hueru" and "Fong Yuning".

In 1985, Chen Huiguang, the Chinese Communist Party secretary of the Guangxi Zhuang Autonomous Regional Committee, visited Hong Kong and met Chen, who sought redress for his father. After returning to mainland China, Chen Huiguang ordered the United Front Work Department to publish a statement, which stated that Chen Xinyu had been wrongfully accused and executed. Chen thanked Chen Huiguang for his help and returned to Mengshan County in 1987 to visit his hometown and pay his respects to his ancestors.

== Retirement and death ==
Chen migrated to Australia with his family in 1987. At the time, he was a member of the China Writers Association and had been offered the position of honorary president of the Yinglian Society of China (YSC) in Shenzhen. He converted to Christianity in September 1994.

On 30 November 2004, Chen received an honorary Doctor of Arts from his alma mater, Lingnan University, which has moved to Hong Kong, for his contributions to the development of literature.

In December 2006, while attending an event in Hong Kong to celebrate Cosmos Books' 30th anniversary, Chen suffered a stroke. After that, he returned to Australia and spent his time recuperating at the Bernard Chan Nursing Home in Burwood, New South Wales. On 22 January 2009, he died of natural causes at the age of 84 in Sydney. Among those who wrote tributes to Chen were his mentor Rao Zongyi, his former boss Luo Fu, fellow wuxia writer Jin Yong, and professor Chan Yiu-nam.

== Writing style ==
Chen's novels always open with a poem – indicating his interest in poetry. The protagonists of his novels also tend to be multi-talented, scholarly and versatile. Besides that, he incorporates elements of Chinese history in his novels – a style also adopted by fellow wuxia writer Jin Yong. However, unlike Jin Yong and other wuxia writers, he does not regard the Shaolin and Wudang sects as the major orthodox sects in the wulin (martial artists' community). Instead, he makes the Mount Heaven Sect (Tianshan Sect) the leading sect in the wulin, particularly in the Tianshan series of novels set in the Ming and Qing dynasties.

== Works ==
Liang Yusheng's novels were primarily published as newspaper serials between the 1950s and 1980s. They are usually divided into major narrative cycles and standalone works. English titles below are descriptive translations rather than official ones. The publication dates listed as follows are from Liang Yusheng's biography.

=== Standalone novels ===
These two novels are self-contained stories with no connection to any of Liang Yusheng's other novels. Nüdi Qiying Zhuan is set in the late seventh and early eighth centuries during Wu Zetian's reign, while Wudang Yijian is set in the 17th century towards the end of the Ming dynasty.

Title	Chinese title	Date of first publication	First publication	Notes
Nüdi Qiying Zhuan (The Female Emperor and the Heroic Genius)	女帝奇英傳	1 July 1961 – 6 August 1962	Hong Kong Commercial Daily	alternative title Tanggong Enyuan Lu (唐宮恩怨錄; "Chronicle of Gratitude and Revenge in the Tang Palace"). It can be considered a prequel to the Great Tang trilogy.
Wudang Yijian (The First Sword of Wudang)	武當一劍	9 May 1980 – 2 August 1983	Ta Kung Pao	The serialised version is related to the Tianshan series but the author removed nearly 300,000 Chinese characters and many recurring characters from the series to fix discrepancies with Baifa Monü Zhuan, which precedes it chronologically and makes it a standalone novel in its book publication.

=== Qing Dynasty Duologies ===
Liang Yusheng occasionally wrote two-part sagas set within a shared narrative arc. Jianwang Chensi and Huanjian Lingqi are set in the mid-18th century during the Qing dynasty and Longhu Dou Jinghua and Caomang Longshe Zhuan are set during the late Qing dynasty at the turn of the 20th century against the backdrop of the Boxer Rebellion (1899–1901).

==== Middle ====
Title	Chinese title	Date of first publication	First publication
Jianwang Chensi (Web of Swords and Dust)	劍網塵絲	1 September 1976 – 26 January 1980	Ta Kung Pao
Huanjian Lingqi (The Phantom Sword and the Spirit Banner)	幻劍靈旗	27 January 1980 – March 1981	Ta Kung Pao

==== Late ====
Title	Chinese title	Date of first publication	First publication
Longhu Dou Jinghua (Clash of Dragon and Tiger in the Capital)	龍虎鬥京華	20 January 1954 – 1 August 1954	New Evening Post
Caomang Longshe Zhuan (Dragons and Serpents among the Common Folk)	草莽龍蛇傳	11 August 1954 – 5 February 1955	New Evening Post

=== The Great Tang Dynasty trilogy ===
The Datang trilogy is set in the mid-eighth century during the Tang dynasty against the backdrop of the An Lushan rebellion (755–763).

#	Title	Chinese title	Date of first publication	First publication
1	Datang Youxia Zhuan (Story of the Wandering Hero of the Great Tang)	大唐游俠傳	1 January 1963 – 14 June 1964	Ta Kung Pao
2	Longfeng Baochai Yuan (Romance of the Dragon and Phoenix Hairpins)	龍鳳寶釵緣	25 June 1964 – 15 May 1966	Ta Kung Pao
3	Huijian Xinmo (The Wise Sword and the Inner Demon)	慧劍心魔	23 May 1966 – 14 March 1968	Ta Kung Pao

=== The Song dynasty ===
These works share overlapping timelines and characters in the 12th and 13th centuries against the backdrop of the wars (1125–1234) between the Song and Jin dynasties, and the rise of the Mongol Empire.

Title	Chinese title	Date of first publication	Chronological Order	First publication	Notes
Kuangxia Tianjiao Monü (Mad Hero, Proud Genius, and Demoness)	狂俠·天驕·魔女	1 July 1964 – 23 June 1968	3	Hong Kong Commercial Daily	alternative title Tiaodeng Kanjian Lu (挑燈看劍錄; "Chronicle of Watching the Sword by Lamplight")
Feifeng Qianlong (Flying Phoenix and Hidden Dragon)	飛鳳潛龍	November 1966	2	Cheng Wu Pao	
Hanhai Xiongfeng (Mighty Winds over the Vast Desert)	瀚海雄風	15 March 1968 – 21 January 1970	4	Ta Kung Pao	
Mingdi Fengyun Lu (Chronicle of the Whistling Arrows)	鳴鏑風雲錄	24 June 1968 – 19 May 1972	5	Hong Kong Commercial Daily	
Fengyun Leidian (Wind and Cloud, Thunder and Lightning)	風雲雷電	9 February 1970 – 31 December 1971	6	Ta Kung Pao	
Wulin Tianjiao (Proud Genius of the Wulin)	武林天驕	2 May 1978 – 9 March 1982	1	Hong Kong Commercial Daily	

=== Pingzong series ===
The Pingzong series is among Liang Yusheng's best-known series, chronicling successive generations of heroes across the 15th century during the Ming dynasty.

#	Title	Chinese title	Date of first publication	First publication
1	Huanjian Qiqing Lu (Tale of the Sword Returned and the Unusual Romance)	還劍奇情錄	November 1959 – May 1960	Hong Kong Commercial Daily
2	Pingzong Xiaying Lu (Chronicle of Wandering Heroes)	萍蹤俠影錄	1 January 1959 – 16 February 1960	Ta Kung Pao
3	Sanhua Nüxia (The Blossom-Scattering Heroine)	散花女俠	23 February 1960 – 22 June 1961	Ta Kung Pao
4	Lianjian Fengyun Lu (Chronicle of the Allied Swords)	聯劍風雲錄	3 July 1961 – 25 November 1962	Ta Kung Pao
5	Wulin Sanjue (Three Supreme Experts of the Wulin)	武林三絕	1 October 1972 – 16 August 1976	Ta Kung Pao
6	Guangling Jian (Sword of Guangling)	廣陵劍	3 June 1972 – 31 July 1976	Hong Kong Commercial Daily

=== Tianshan series ===
The Tianshan series is Liang Yusheng's earliest series of novels, noted for its frontier settings and recurring heroes and heroines. Its historical setting spans from the end of the Ming dynasty in the 17th century to the mid-Qing dynasty in the 19th century.

#	Title	Chinese title	Date of first publication	First publication	Connection to other novels	Notes
1	Baifa Monü Zhuan (The White-Haired Demoness)	白髮魔女傳	5 August 1957 – 8 September 1958	New Evening Post	Baifa Monü Zhuan, Saiwai Qixia Zhuan and Qijian Xia Tianshan form a trilogy	
2	Saiwai Qixia Zhuan (Legend of the Gallant Hero Beyond the Frontier)	塞外奇俠傳	1955 – 1957	Chou Mo Pao	Baifa Monü Zhuan, Saiwai Qixia Zhuan and Qijian Xia Tianshan form a trilogy	alternative title Feihongjin (飛紅巾; "Flying Red Sash")
3	Qijian Xia Tianshan (Seven Swords of Mount Heaven)	七劍下天山	15 February 1956 – 31 March 1957	Ta Kung Pao	Baifa Monü Zhuan, Saiwai Qixia Zhuan and Qijian Xia Tianshan form a trilogy	
4	Jianghu San Nüxia (Three Heroines of the Jianghu)	江湖三女俠	8 April 1957 – 10 December 1958	Ta Kung Pao		
5	Bingpo Hanguang Jian (Sword of the Icy Soul)	冰魄寒光劍	1962	Cheng Wu Pao		alternative title Yougu Hanbing (幽谷寒冰; "Frost of the Hidden Valley")
6	Bingchuan Tiannü Zhuan (Story of the Heavenly Maiden of the Glacier)	冰川天女傳	5 August 1959 – 18 December 1960	New Evening Post	Bingchuan Tiannü Zhuan, Yunhai Yugong Yuan and Binghe Xijian Lu form a trilogy	
7	Yunhai Yugong Yuan (Romance of the Cloud Sea and Jade Bow)	雲海玉弓緣	12 October 1961 – 9 August 1963	New Evening Post	Bingchuan Tiannü Zhuan, Yunhai Yugong Yuan and Binghe Xijian Lu form a trilogy	
8	Binghe Xijian Lu (Chronicle of Washing the Sword in the Icy River)	冰河洗劍錄	24 August 1963 – 22 August 1965	New Evening Post	Bingchuan Tiannü Zhuan, Yunhai Yugong Yuan and Binghe Xijian Lu form a trilogy	
9	Fenglei Zhen Jiuzhou (Wind and Thunder Shake the Nine Provinces)	風雷震九州	22 September 1965 – 28 September 1967	New Evening Post		
10	Xiagu Danxin (Chivalrous Bones and Loyal Heart)	俠骨丹心	5 October 1967 – 20 June 1969	New Evening Post		
11	Youjian Jianghu (Wandering Swordsman in the Jianghu)	游劍江湖	1 July 1969 – 4 February 1972	New Evening Post	Youjian Jianghu, Muye Liuxing, Tanzhi Jinglei and Juesai Chuanfeng Lu form a tetralogy	alternative title Tan Jia Ge (彈鋏歌; "Ballad of the Strummed Sword")
12	Muye Liuxing (Shooting Stars over the Grasslands)	牧野流星	16 February 1972 – 13 January 1975	New Evening Post	Youjian Jianghu, Muye Liuxing, Tanzhi Jinglei and Juesai Chuanfeng Lu form a tetralogy	alternative title Zheji Chensha Lu (折戟沉沙錄; "Chronicle of Broken Spears Beneath the Sands")
13	Tanzhi Jinglei (A Flick of the Finger, Startling Thunder)	彈指驚雷	1 May 1977 – 9 March 1981	Chou Mo Pao	Youjian Jianghu, Muye Liuxing, Tanzhi Jinglei and Juesai Chuanfeng Lu form a tetralogy	
14	Juesai Chuanfeng Lu (Chronicle of the Frontier Beacons)	絕塞傳烽錄	12 February 1975 – 10 April 1978	New Evening Post	Youjian Jianghu, Muye Liuxing, Tanzhi Jinglei and Juesai Chuanfeng Lu form a tetralogy	

== See also ==
- Jin Yong
- Gu Long
