= Jianwang Chensi =

1976 wuxia novel by Liang Yusheng

- Author: Liang Yusheng
- Original title: 劍網塵絲
- Language: Chinese
- Genre: Wuxia
- Set in: 18th-century China
- Publisher: Ta Kung Pao
- Publication date: 1 September 1976 – 26 January 1980
- Publication place: Hong Kong
- Media type: Print
- ISBN: 9786263756205
- Preceded by: Juesai Chuanfeng Lu
- Followed by: Huanjian Lingqi

Jianwang Chensi
- Traditional Chinese: 劍網塵絲
- Simplified Chinese: 剑网尘丝
- Literal meaning: Web of Swords and Dust
Transcriptions
Standard Mandarin
- Hanyu Pinyin: Jiàn Wǎng Chén Sī
Yue: Cantonese
- Jyutping: Gim^{3} Mong^{5} Can^{4} Si^{1}

Jianwang Chensi (劍網塵絲), literally Web of Swords and Dust, is a wuxia novel by Liang Yusheng. It was first published as a serial between 1 September 1976 and 26 January 1980 in the Hong Kong newspaper Ta Kung Pao. The novel is followed by a sequel, Huanjian Lingqi, and features references to characters from Liang Yusheng's earlier Tianshan series.

== Publication history ==
Jianwang Chensi was first published as a serial between 1 September 1976 and 26 January 1980 in the Hong Kong newspaper Ta Kung Pao. Subsequent reprints include a 1987 edition by Hebei People's Publishing House, a 1988 edition by Kunlun Publishing House, a 1988 three-volume edition by Culture and Art Publishing House, a 1996 two-volume edition by Guangdong Travel and Tourism Press, and a 2012 three-volume edition by the Sun Yat-Sen University Press.

== Plot summary ==
Set in 18th-century China during the Qing dynasty, the story follows the interwoven destinies of various families in the wulin. Wei Tianyuan was raised and trained by the swordsman Qi Yanran after his father, an anti-Qing rebel, had been betrayed and killed. Meanwhile, Qi Yanran's son, Qi Leming, had disgraced himself by attacking his wife, Zhuang Yingnan, in a drunken rage and committing other atrocities. Zhuang Yingnan had since remarried Chu Jinsong, while Qi Leming had vanished after getting injured in a duel. Believed to be dead, Qi Leming had been rescued by Mu Juanjuan, who had fallen in love with him. However, he had scorned and abandoned her later, leading her to seek revenge.

Wei Tianyuan, upon completing his training, sets out to avenge his father. He discovers that his father was betrayed by Xu Zhongyue, a martial artist with ties to the Qing government. At Xu Zhongyue's wedding, Wei Tianyuan challenges him to a duel and wounds him, only to be stunned when the bride turns out to be his childhood sweetheart, Jiang Xuejun. Distracted, Wei Tianyuan is seriously injured but rescued by Qi Shuyu, the daughter of Qi Leming and Zhuang Yingnan.

Later, Wei Tianyuan reveals Xu Zhongyue's crimes to Jiang Xuejun, and the two join forces to expose him. They are defeated by Xu Zhongyue's allies, and Jiang Xuejun is captured before being rescued by Chu Tianshu, Chu Jinsong's son. During the rescue, Chu Tianshu is ambushed and injured by Qi Leming, who has reappeared in the wulin with formidable new skills. Chu Tianshu recovers under Qi Yanran's care, and together with Jiang Xuejun and Qi Shuyu, sets out for Beijing to find his father and Wei Tianyuan.

In Beijing, the web of vengeance tightens. Qi Leming infiltrates Chu Jinsong's home to see his ex-wife Zhuang Yingnan, who has been poisoned. Old grudges resurface, and a fierce battle breaks out between Qi Leming, Chu Jinsong, and their allies. Meanwhile, Mu Juanjuan and her sister Mu Haohao, who has married into the Yuwen family, kidnap Qi Shuyu to force Qi Leming to surrender. Wei Tianyuan, aided by the swordswoman Shangguan Feifeng, rescues the captives after a series of confrontations with the Mu sisters and Yuwens.

In the aftermath, Qi Shuyu confronts her father. Realising the futility of hatred, Qi Leming seeks forgiveness from his father Qi Yanran, and vows to leave the wulin forever. Fearing her father might relapse into violence, Qi Shuyu secretly gives him a drug that nullifies his neigong. Mu Juanjuan arrives, claiming to forgive Qi Leming, but cripples him by breaking his scapulas to force him to keep his promise. The story ends with the surviving characters coming to terms with loss, redemption, and the endless cycles of vengeance that bind them.

== Principal characters ==
- Wei Tianyuan (衛天元) – the protagonist and Qi Yanran's apprentice.
- Jiang Xuejun (姜雪君) – Wei Tianyuan's lover.
- Chu Tianshu (楚天舒) – Chu Jinsong's son and Wei Tianyuan's ally.
- Qi Shuyu (齊漱玉) – Qi Leming and Zhuang Yingnan's daughter, and Wei Tianyuan's ally.
- Qi Leming (齊勒銘) – the main antagonist, Qi Yanran's son and Qi Shuyu's father.
- Qi Yanran (齊燕然) – one of the top three swordsmen in the wulin.
- Shangguan Feifeng (上官飛鳳) – a swordswoman and Wei Tianyuan's ally.
- Chu Jinsong (楚勁松) – a wulin hero from Yangzhou.
- Zhuang Yingnan (莊英男) – Qi Leming's ex-wife who remarried Chu Jinsong, and Chu Tianshu's stepmother.
- Mu Juanjuan (穆娟娟) – Qi Leming's lover.
- Mu Haohao (穆好好) – Mu Juanjuan's sister who marries into the Yuwen family.
- Xu Zhongyue (徐中嶽) – the secondary antagonist and a well-known martial artist.

== Reception and legacy ==
Jianwang Chensi is regarded as one of Liang Yusheng's works from the later or "mature" phase of his writing career that reflect his stylistic transition towards psychological realism and moral ambiguity. University theses note that the novel, later published in two parts, exemplifies his attempt to move beyond the conventional good-versus-evil dichotomy.

A Ming Pao Monthly article reviewing Liang Yusheng's career similarly observes that Jianwang Chensi marked his deepening interest in complex character motivations and shifting narrative perspectives.

On Douban, the novel holds an average rating of around seven out of ten, with readers praising its intricate relationships and mature tone, while some criticise its slower pacing compared with Liang Yusheng's earlier action-driven novels.
