= Wulin Tianjiao =

1978 wuxia novel by Liang Yusheng

- Author: Liang Yusheng
- Original title: 武林天驕
- Language: Chinese
- Genre: Wuxia
- Set in: 12th-century China
- Publisher: Hong Kong Commercial Daily
- Publication date: 2 May 1978 – 9 March 1982
- Publication place: Hong Kong
- Media type: Print
- ISBN: 9787306043931
- Followed by: Kuangxia Tianjiao Monü

Wulin Tianjiao
- Traditional Chinese: 武林天驕
- Simplified Chinese: 武林天骄
- Literal meaning: Proud Genius of the Wulin
Transcriptions
Standard Mandarin
- Hanyu Pinyin: Wǔ Lín Tiān Jiāo
Yue: Cantonese
- Jyutping: Mou^{5} Lam^{4} Tin^{1} Giu^{1}

Wulin Tianjiao (武林天驕), literally Proud Genius of the Wulin, is a wuxia novel by Liang Yusheng. It was first published as a serial in the newspaper Hong Kong Commercial Daily from 2 May 1978 to 9 March 1982. Set in 12th-century China during the Jin–Song wars, the story follows Tan Yuchong – a descendant of a Jin nobleman and the Song general Yue Fei – whose mixed Song–Jin heritage compels him to seek peace between the two warring empires.

The novel explores ideals of chivalry, loyalty and reconciliation, contrasting the political conflict of the period with the personal dilemmas of its heroes. It serves as a prequel to Kuangxia Tianjiao Monü, expanding on the origins of several key characters. Although later written, Wulin Tianjiao is regarded as one of Liang Yusheng's works which reflect his shift towards historical realism and moral introspection in the "mature" or later phase of his writing career.

== Publication history ==
Wulin Tianjiao was first published as a serial in the newspaper Hong Kong Commercial Daily from 2 May 1978 to 9 March 1982. Subsequent reprints include a 1989 edition by China Friendship Publishing Company, a 1993 two-volume edition by Beiyue Literature & Art Publishing House, a 1996 edition by Guangdong Travel and Tourism Press, a 1996 two-volume edition by Cosmos Books, and 2012 and 2019 editions by the Sun Yat-Sen University Press.

== Plot summary ==
The story is set in 12th-century China during the wars between the Song and Jin empires. Tan Yuchong is of mixed Jin–Song heritage: his mother Zhang Xuebo is the Song general Yue Fei's maternal granddaughter, while his father Tan Daocheng is descended from a Jin nobleman who turned away from war.

The Tans have living peacefully in the countryside for years until their identities are revealed, and they find themselves the targets of both sides. In the ensuing conflict, Tan Daocheng and his father are killed while Zhang Xuebo, disfigured and on the run, hides with her children in the household of a Jin governor. Through a serendipitous encounter, Tan Yuchong becomes an apprentice of Yelü Xuanyuan, who recognises his aptitude for martial arts. Zhang Xuebo later dies during a clash with Jin soldiers.

Years later, Tan Yuchong sets out to fulfil his parents' wish to promote peace between Song and Jin. His martial prowess earns him fame after he defeats a Jin warrior, but also makes him an enemy of the Jin royal family. In the Song capital Lin'an, he is mistaken for a Jin spy by members of the wulin, who attack him. After suffering grave wounds, he is rescued by his friends and nursed back to health.

Gradually accepted by the wulin as they learn of his background, Tan Yuchong honours his Song heritage by presenting his maternal great-grandfather's handwritten copy of the poem "Man Jiang Hong" to the wulin. After that, he withdraws to a mountain on the Song–Jin border to live in seclusion.

== Principal characters ==
- Tan Yuchong (檀羽衝) – the titular protagonist with mixed Jin–Song heritage who seeks to maintain peace between both sides.
- Zhong Lingxiu (鐘靈秀) – Tan Yuchong's romantic partner who sacrifices her life to protect him.
- Helian Qingyun (赫連清雲) – the second of the Helian sisters and Tan Yuchong's eventual wife.
- Helian Qingbo (赫連清波) – the eldest of the Helian sisters and Wanyan Zhangzhi's goddaughter.
- Tan Gongzhi (檀公直) – Tan Yuchong's grandfather, a Jin nobleman who turned away from war.
- Tan Daocheng (檀道成) – Tan Gongzhi's son and Tan Yuchong's father.
- Zhang Xuebo (張雪波) – Tan Yuchong's mother. Her parents were Zhang Xian and Yue Yinping.
- Yelü Xuanyuan (耶律玄元) – a descendant of the Liao royal family who trains Tan Yuchong in martial arts.
- Wanyan Jian (完顏鑒) – Wanyan Zhangzhi's nephew and the Jin governor of Shangzhou.

== Continuity with Kuangxia Tianjiao Monü ==
Although Wulin Tianjiao was written as a prequel to Kuangxia Tianjiao Monü, critics and scholars have noted discontinuities between the two works. Literary commentators attribute most apparent contradictions to differences between the original newspaper serial and the later edited book editions: substantial cuts and revisions during republication have left some narrative threads underdeveloped, producing fragmentation that conflict with events and character detail in Kuangxia Tianjiao Monü.

== Reception and legacy ==
The novel received a mixed critical reception on publication and has since been discussed as a notable example of Liang Yusheng's experimentation with a new writing style in the later or "mature" phase of his writing career. Some commentators praise Wulin Tianjiao for its shift towards more complex characterisation and its engagement with themes of ethnic reconciliation and the moral ambiguities of the wulin.

At the same time, several accounts note that because the novel was serialised over a long span and underwent substantial editorial cuts for publication, the narrative feels fragmentary in places.

While Wulin Tianjiao has fewer standalone scholarly studies than some of Liang Yusheng's better-known works, it is cited in discussions of the development of his writing style and the evolution of the wuxia genre since the 1950s.
