= Kuangxia Tianjiao Monü =

1964 wuxia novel by Liang Yusheng

- Author: Liang Yusheng
- Original title: 狂俠·天驕·魔女
- Language: Chinese
- Genre: Wuxia
- Set in: 12th-century China
- Publisher: Hong Kong Commercial Daily
- Publication date: 1 July 1964 – 23 June 1968
- Publication place: Hong Kong
- Media type: Print
- ISBN: 9786263755765
- Preceded by: Wulin Tianjiao
- Followed by: Hanhai Xiongfeng

Kuangxia Tianjiao Monü
- Traditional Chinese: 狂俠·天驕·魔女
- Simplified Chinese: 狂侠·天骄·魔女
- Literal meaning: Mad Hero, Proud Genius, and Demoness
Transcriptions
Standard Mandarin
- Hanyu Pinyin: Kuáng Xiá Tiān Jiāo Mó Nǚ
Yue: Cantonese
- Jyutping: Kong^{4} Hap^{6} Tin^{1} Giu^{1} Mo^{1} Neoi^{5}

Tiaodeng Kanjian Lu
- Traditional Chinese: 挑燈看劍錄
- Simplified Chinese: 挑灯看剑录
- Literal meaning: Chronicle of Watching the Sword by Lamplight
Transcriptions
Standard Mandarin
- Hanyu Pinyin: Tiāo Dēng Kàn Jiàn Lù
Yue: Cantonese
- Jyutping: Tiu^{1} Dang^{1} Hon^{3} Gim^{3} Luk^{6}

Kuangxia Tianjiao Monü (狂俠·天驕·魔女), literally Mad Hero, Proud Genius, and Demoness, is a wuxia novel by Liang Yusheng. It was first published as a serial in the newspaper Hong Kong Commercial Daily from 1 July 1964 to 23 June 1968. The novel is also known by an alternative title, Tiaodeng Kanjian Lu (挑燈看劍錄; "Chronicle of Watching the Sword by Lamplight").

Set in 12th-century China during the Jin–Song wars, the novel follows the three titular characters through intersecting conflicts among the Song, Jin and Mongol empires. It is connected to Liang Yusheng's other novels set in the Song dynasty, including Hanhai Xiongfeng, Mingdi Fengyun Lu, and Fengyun Leidian.

Kuangxia Tianjiao Monü is one of Liang Yusheng's representative works from the middle phase of his writing career, and his longest novel at a length of approximately 1.36 million Chinese characters. A prequel, Wulin Tianjiao, was later written and published between 1978 and 1982.

== Publication history ==
Kuangxia Tianjiao Monü was first published as a serial in the newspaper Hong Kong Commercial Daily from 1 July 1964 to 23 June 1968. Subsequent reprints include an eight-volume edition by Ningxia Literature Publishing House, a 1987 seven-volume edition by Sichuan Ethnic Publishing House, a 1988 edition by Chinese Workers' Publishing House, a 1993 five-volume edition by Qingdao Publishing House, a 1993 six-volume edition and a 1995 eight-volume edition by Cosmos Books, a 1996 four-volume edition by Guangdong Travel and Tourism Press, a 2003 five-volume edition by Storm & Stress Publishing Company, and 2015 and 2019 five-volume editions by the Sun Yat-Sen University Press.

== Plot summary ==
The story is set in 12th-century China against the backdrop of the wars between the Jin and Song empires. It opens with Geng Zhao, a Song spy's son who sets out to deliver an intelligence report on the Jin Empire to the Song government. His mission is complicated when he gets attacked by Jin agents, and runs into trouble with villainous martial artists like Gongsun Qi and Helian Qingbo. Liu Qingyao, an outlaw leader nicknamed "Demoness of Penglai", saves Geng Zhao and supports him as he complete his quest.

Liu Qingyao discovers that Gongsun Qi, Helian Qingbo and her sisters, and others are connected through an earlier generation of martial artists trained by a master who wanted to promote peace among the Jin, Song, and Liao empires. Seeking to master two deadly skills created by his late father-in-law, Gongsun Qi conspires with Helian Qingbo to murder his wife, Sang Baihong, who has been safekeeping the manuals for the skills, and seize the manuals for himself.

Travelling south, Liu Qingyao gets entangled in a love triangle with "Mad Hero" Hua Guhan and "Proud Genius" Tan Yuchong. She also becomes a target of Liu Yuanjia, a Jin spy impersonating her long-lost father Liu Yuanzong. With Hua Guhan and Tan Yuchong's help, Liu Qingyao uncovers Liu Yuanjia's treachery and reunites with her father.

When the Jin emperor Wanyan Liang personally leads his troops to invade the Song Empire, Liu Qingyao rallies her wulin allies to support the Song forces. Tan Yuchong is captured by Jin forces at one point, but Liu Qingyao rescues him with help from the Jin general Yelü Yuanyi, who betrays the Jin Empire. The Song defenders ultimately defeat the Jin invaders at the Battle of Caishi, and Wanyan Liang is assassinated by Wu Shidun, a Beggar Clan member.

Meanwhile, Gongsun Qi gets involved in another conspiracy and tries to seize control of the Beggar Clan, murdering Helian Qingbo to gain the clan's trust. At the Beggar Clan's grand assembly, Liu Qingyao and Hua Guhan expose Gongsun Qi's machinations, forcing him to flee. Wu Shidun, with popular support, becomes the Beggar Clan's new chief.

Gongsun Qi later abducts Sang Baihong's sister, Sang Qinghong, forcing her to marry him and help him master her father's two deadly skills. To avenge her sister, she sabotages his training, leaving him in a fatal zouhuorumo state. Meanwhile, Tan Yuchong loses his neigong after being poisoned by the Jin emperor Wanyan Yong, but is saved by Liu Qingyao and Hua Guhan, and recovers after a year.

In the final confrontation, the heroes team up to defeat the villains. Gongsun Qi, dying from his self-inflicted zouhuorumo, finally repents before his death. The story concludes with Liu Qingyao and Hua Guhan's marriage, while Tan Yuchong marries Helian Qingyun. The three become legendary figures of the wulin, remembered respectively as the "Demoness", the "Mad Hero", and the "Proud Genius".

== Principal characters ==
- Hua Guhan (華谷涵) – the "Mad Hero", a highly-skilled martial artist who fights with a fan.
- Liu Qingyao (柳清瑤) – the "Demoness of Penglai", an outlaw and wulin leader in northern China known for her fierce sense of justice.
- Tan Yuchong (檀羽衝) – the "Proud Genius", a Jin nobleman and martial artist with mixed Jin–Song heritage.
- Helian Qingyun (赫連清雲) – Tan Yuchong's wife and the second of the Helian sisters.
- Gongsun Qi (公孫奇) – the main antagonist and Liu Qingyao's foster brother.
- Sang Baihong (桑白虹) – Gongsun Qi's first wife.
- Helian Qingbo (赫連清波) – a Jin noblewoman and the eldest of the Helian sisters.
- Sang Qinghong (桑青虹) – Sang Baihong's sister who is forced to marry Gongsun Qi.
- Geng Zhao (耿照) – a Song spy's son who delivers intelligence on the Jin Empire to the Song government.
- Qin Nongyu (秦弄玉) – Geng Zhao's wife.
- Yelü Yuanyi (耶律元宜) – a Liao nobleman who initially serves as a Jin general but later turns against the Jin Empire.
- Helian Qingxia (赫連清霞) – Yelü Yuanyi's wife and the youngest of the Helian sisters.
- Wu Shidun (武士敦) – a Beggar Clan member who becomes the clan's next chief.
- Liu Yuanzong (柳元宗) – Liu Qingyao's father.
- Liu Yuanjia (柳元甲) – Liu Yuanzong's cousin and a Jin spy.

== Reception and legacy ==
Kuangxia Tianjiao Monü has received positive reviews for its complex moral tone and integration of historical events into a martial-arts narrative. Critics have noted its portrayal of personal and national conflict as a hallmark of Liang Yusheng's mid-career writing style.

Along with its prequel Wulin Tianjiao, the story is credited for bridging traditional chivalric ideals with emerging modern concerns about identity and cultural decline. It has also been referenced in studies of the evolution of mid-20th-century Hong Kong wuxia literature.

== Adaptations ==
The novel was adapted into a 1988 Hong Kong television series The Ranger, Superior and Demon Girl produced by ATV, starring Ban Ban, Yu Tien-Lung and Lau Wun-fung.
