= Lianjian Fengyun Lu =

1961 wuxia novel by Liang Yusheng

- Author: Liang Yusheng
- Original title: 聯劍風雲錄
- Language: Chinese
- Genre: Wuxia
- Set in: 15th-century China
- Publisher: Ta Kung Pao
- Publication date: 3 July 1961 – 25 November 1962
- Publication place: Hong Kong
- Media type: Print
- ISBN: 9787536008816
- Preceded by: Sanhua Nüxia
- Followed by: Wulin Sanjue

Lianjian Fengyun Lu
- Traditional Chinese: 聯劍風雲錄
- Simplified Chinese: 联剑风云录
- Literal meaning: Chronicle of the Allied Swords
Transcriptions
Standard Mandarin
- Hanyu Pinyin: Lián Jiàn Fēng Yún Lù
Yue: Cantonese
- Jyutping: Lyun^{4} Gim^{3} Fung^{1} Wan^{4} Luk^{6}

Lianjian Fengyun Lu (聯劍風雲錄), literally Chronicle of the Allied Swords, is a wuxia novel by Liang Yusheng. It was first published as a serial between 3 July 1961 and 25 November 1962 in the Hong Kong newspaper Ta Kung Pao. The novel is the fourth instalment in the Pingzong series, following Sanhua Nüxia and preceding Wulin Sanjue.

Set during the Ming dynasty, the story continues the saga of characters from the earlier novels and introduces a new generation of heroes caught between loyalty, love, and duty. It combines historical settings with recurring themes of moral conflict and idealism typical of Liang Yusheng's mid-career works.

== Publication history ==
Lianjian Fengyun Lu was first published as a serial between 3 July 1961 and 25 November 1962 in the Hong Kong newspaper Ta Kung Pao. Subsequent reprints include a 1988 two-volume edition by Kunlun Publishing House, a 1991 edition by Huacheng Publishing House, a 1996 three-volume edition by Cosmos Books, a 1996 two-volume edition by Guangdong Travel and Tourism Press, and a 2012 two-volume edition by the Sun Yat-Sen University Press.

== Plot summary ==
Set in 15th-century China during the Ming dynasty after the Tumu Crisis, the novel focuses on a new generation of heroes. Tie Jingxin has settled into married life with Mu Yan in Yunnan. Restless with domestic life, he joins a convoy carrying tribute to Beijing to celebrate the Chenghua Emperor's coronation.

Along the journey, Tie Jingxin encounters the outlaw Zhang Yuhu, who intends to rob the tribute to fund a militia protecting the coastal regions from wokou incursions. Their paths cross with another outlaw Long Jianhong, whom Zhang Yuhu starts a romance with. Meanwhile, Zhang Yuhu becomes entangled with Yin Xiulan, a cult leader's daughter who falls in love with him. Conflicts among these groups intertwine political intrigue, personal honour, and romantic rivalry.

Back in Hangzhou, Tie Jingxin reconciles with his estranged master Shi Jingtao and witnesses the growing tension between wulin factions loyal to the Ming government and those opposing it. Disillusioned by political corruption after a brief stint as an imperial guard, Tie Jingxin decides to focus on refining his swordsmanship.

Zhang Yuhu and his allies continue their struggle against antagonistic forces, including the formidable martial artist Qiao Beiming, the poison specialist Shi Jinghan, and wulin fighters serving the Ming government. During one confrontation, Yin Xiulan sacrifices her neigong to save Zhang Yuhu from a deadly poison, earning his enduring respect. Long Jianhong, recognising Yin Xiulan's devotion, quietly steps aside.

Elsewhere, the older generation of heroes return to fight injustice and support their younger counterparts in the escalating conflicts, culminating in a climactic duel between Zhang Danfeng and Qiao Beiming at Mount Lao.

By the end, the younger heroes mature through sacrifice and loss. Zhang Yuhu and Long Jianhong reunite, Yin Xiulan and Zhou Zhixia marry, and the surviving militia members regroup to continue their mission.

== Principal characters ==
- Zhang Yuhu (張玉虎) – Zhang Fengfu's son, Zhang Danfeng's apprentice and an outlaw leader.
- Long Jianhong (龍劍虹) – Ling Yunfeng's apprentice and an outlaw leader.
- Tie Jingxin (鐵鏡心) – Shi Jingtao's apprentice and Mu Yan's husband.
- Mu Yan (沐燕) – a noblewoman from Yunnan whose ancestor was Mu Ying.
- Ling Yunfeng (凌雲鳳) and Huo Tiandu (霍天都) – a couple from Mount Heaven who are highly skilled in swordsmanship. Their respective apprentices, Lian Nichang and Yue Mingke, are the protagonists of Baifa Monü Zhuan, linking the Pingzong series to the Tianshan series.
- Mu Lin (沐璘) – Mu Yan's brother who accompanies Tie Jingxin on his mission.
- Zhang Danfeng (張丹楓) – one of the top four swordsmen in the wulin who supports the next generation of heroes.
- Shi Jingtao (石驚濤) – one of the top four swordsmen in the wulin.
- Zhou Zhixia (周志俠) – Zhou Shanmin and Shi Cuifeng's son who joins Zhang Yuhu on his adventures.
- Yin Yunyu (陰蘊玉) – a martial artist who founded a cult to protect women like herself who have suffered injustice.
- Shi Jinghan (石鏡涵) – Yin Yunyu's senior who raped and disfigured her years ago. A specialist in using poisons, he incapacitates the heroes with a deadly poison at one point.
- Yin Xiulan (陰秀蘭) – Yin Yunyu and Shi Jinghan's daughter who eventually marries Zhou Zhixia.
- Qiao Beiming (喬北溟) – the primary antagonist and a formidable martial artist from Xingxiu Lake. After his defeat, he retreats to an island, where the treasures he leaves behind are found centuries later.
- Li Kangtian (厲抗天) – Qiao Beiming's apprentice. His descendant Li Shengnan avenges Qiao Beiming by defeating Zhang Danfeng's heir, linking the Pingzong series to the Tianshan series.

== Reception and legacy ==
Lianjian Fengyun Lu is regarded by critics as one of Liang Yusheng's notable mid-career works. Scholars and compilers of wuxia reference books describe it as extending the earlier storylines of the Pingzong series into something more mature and psychologically nuanced. In critical anthologies of the genre, the novel is praised for its depiction of moral duty, leadership burdens, and the tension between personal loyalty and public responsibility.

Reader reception is mixed but generally positive. On Douban, the novel holds a rating of 6.7/10 from over 300 users, with readers praising Liang Yusheng's poetic prose, historical setting, and complex interpersonal relationships, though some have criticised its slower pacing in the subplots. Critics have also noted that while the climactic duel between Zhang Danfeng and Qiao Beiming is among the most compelling ones in Liang Yusheng's novels, other sequences involving younger characters are less cohesively integrated into the main narrative.
