= Fengyun Leidian =

1970 wuxia novel by Liang Yusheng

- Author: Liang Yusheng
- Original title: 風雲雷電
- Language: Chinese
- Genre: Wuxia
- Set in: 13th-century China
- Publisher: Ta Kung Pao
- Publication date: 9 February 1970 – 31 December 1971
- Publication place: Hong Kong
- Media type: Print
- ISBN: 9787306043894
- Preceded by: Mingdi Fengyun Lu

Fengyun Leidian
- Traditional Chinese: 風雲雷電
- Simplified Chinese: 风云雷电
- Literal meaning: Wind and Cloud, Thunder and Lightning
Transcriptions
Standard Mandarin
- Hanyu Pinyin: Fēng Yún Léi Diàn
Yue: Cantonese
- Jyutping: Fung^{1} Wan^{4} Leoi^{4} Din^{6}

Fengyun Leidian (風雲雷電), literally Wind and Cloud, Thunder and Lightning, is a wuxia novel by Liang Yusheng first published as a serial in the Hong Kong newspaper Ta Kung Pao from 9 February 1970 to 31 December 1971. Set in 13th-century China during the Song dynasty, it follows a group of martial artists who join forces to resist invasions by the Jin and Mongol empires. The novel is loosely connected to Liang Yusheng's other novels set in the Song dynasty, including Kuangxia Tianjiao Monü, Hanhai Xiongfeng, and Mingdi Fengyun Lu.

The story combines historical and martial arts elements, makes references to characters from the classical novel Water Margin, and depicts its four central heroes — nicknamed Wind, Cloud, Thunder and Lightning — as representatives of unity and patriotic resistance. Critics and scholars have described Fengyun Leidian as characteristic of the later or "mature" phase of Liang Yusheng's writing career. While praised for its ambition and historical imagination, it has also been noted for its length and diffuse narrative focus.

== Publication history ==
Fengyun Leidian was first published as a serial in the Hong Kong newspaper Ta Kung Pao from 9 February 1970 to 31 December 1971. Subsequent reprints include a 1988 edition by Kunlun Publishing House, a 1988 five-volume edition by the Sichuan Ethnic Publishing House, a 1995 five-volume edition by Cosmos Books, a 1996 two-volume edition by Guangdong Travel and Tourism Press, and a 2012 three-volume edition by the Sun Yat-Sen University Press.

== Plot summary ==
The story is set in 13th-century China during the wars between the Song, Jin and Mongol empires. The wulin has mobilised to form a militia to defend the Song Empire, while the Mongols and Jin Empire have also established a secret alliance targeting the militia.

Feng Tianyang, an established fighter in the wulin, meets Yun Zhongyan, who persuades him to help search for a lost military treatise by Wu Yong. After retrieving it, she betrays their agreement and keeps the book. Feng Tianyang later befriends Ling Tiewei, a newcomer to the wulin who becomes famous after defeating an intruder at a family friend's birthday banquet. He begins a romance with Lü Yuyao and also befriends Geng Dian, the son of Geng Zhao and Qin Nongyu.

Yun Zhongyan eventually hands over the treatise and reveals herself as a Mongol princess. Originally sent to gather intelligence for the Mongols, she turns against her family after falling in love with Feng Tianyang, and joins the militia.

Meanwhile, Geng Dian seeks Tan Yuchong's apprentice Yang Wanqing, his arranged fiancée, who has intercepted intelligence of an impending attack on the militia's allies in the Qilian Mountains. With his help, she leads a defence that thwarts the invaders.

When Yun Zhongyan is captured in the Jin capital Zhongdu, her friends, supported by the militia and their wulin allies, stage a daring rescue and defeat the Mongol–Jin forces. The story concludes with peace temporarily restored and the heroes united with their respective lovers — Feng Tianyang with Yun Zhongyan, Ling Tiewei with Lü Yuyao, and Geng Dian with Yang Wanqing.

== Principal characters ==
- Feng Tianyang (風天揚), nicknamed "Black Whirlwind" (黑旋風) – Tu Baicheng's apprentice.
- Yun Zhongyan (雲中燕; "Swallow in the Clouds") – a Mongol princess who is trained by her aunt Minghui.
- Ling Tiewei (凌鐵威), nicknamed "Heaven Shaking Thunder" (轟天雷) – a descendant of Ling Zhen and newcomer to the wulin.
- Geng Dian (耿電), nicknamed "Lightning Hand" (閃電手) – Geng Zhao and Qin Nongyu's son.
- Lü Yuyao (呂玉瑤) – Lü Dongyan's daughter who marries Ling Tiewei.
- Yang Wanqing (楊浣青) – Tan Yuchong's apprentice and Geng Dian's fiancée.

== Reception and legacy ==
Fengyun Leidian is notable for its quartet of youthful protagonists (the titular "Wind, Cloud, Thunder and Lightning") and for foregrounding collective resistance in the Song Empire against Jin and Mongol incursions.

Contemporary media coverage and cultural retrospectives credit Liang Yusheng for pioneering the "new school" wuxia genre that emerged in Hong Kong in the mid-1950s, and consider Fengyun Leidian as one of Liang Yusheng's significant works from the later or "mature" phase of his writing career. However, critical commentary of Liang Yusheng's late-career works also notes unevenness in plotting, and the extension of narratives across large, multi-threaded serials.

Reader reception is mixed: reading platforms show moderate ratings and comments praising Liang Yusheng's writing style and the novels's patriotic themes, while some deem the novel to be less tightly plotted compared to Liang Yusheng's better-known earlier works. For example, the Douban entry for Fengyun Leidian (reader rating about 6.3) contains a mix of praises on characterisations and historical detail, alongside criticisms about plot density and the wide range of characters.
