= Hanhai Xiongfeng =

1968 wuxia novel by Liang Yusheng

- Author: Liang Yusheng
- Original title: 瀚海雄風
- Language: Chinese
- Genre: Wuxia
- Set in: 13th-century China
- Publisher: Ta Kung Pao
- Publication date: 15 March 1968 – 21 January 1970
- Publication place: Hong Kong
- Media type: Print
- ISBN: 9787306043740
- Preceded by: Kuangxia Tianjiao Monü
- Followed by: Mingdi Fengyun Lu

Hanhai Xiongfeng
- Traditional Chinese: 瀚海雄風
- Simplified Chinese: 瀚海雄风
- Literal meaning: Mighty Winds over the Vast Desert
Transcriptions
Standard Mandarin
- Hanyu Pinyin: Hàn Hǎi Xióng Fēng
Yue: Cantonese
- Jyutping: Hon^{6} Hoi^{2} Hung^{4} Fung^{1}

Damo Tenglong Ji
- Traditional Chinese: 大漠騰龍記
- Simplified Chinese: 大漠腾龙记
Transcriptions
Standard Mandarin
- Hanyu Pinyin: Dà Mò Téng Lóng Jì
Yue: Cantonese
- Jyutping: Daai^{6} Mok^{6} Tang^{4} Lung^{4} Gei^{3}

Hanhai Xiongfeng (瀚海雄風), literally Mighty Winds over the Vast Desert, is a wuxia novel by Liang Yusheng. It was first published as a serial in the Hong Kong newspaper Ta Kung Pao from 15 March 1968 to 21 January 1970. The novel is also known by an alternative title, Damo Tenglong Ji (大漠騰龍記; "Tale of the Soaring Dragon in the Vast Desert"), when it was first published in Taiwan.

Set in 13th-century China, the novel follows Li Sinan, a wandering hero whose search for his missing father draws him into the struggle between the Song, Jin and Mongol empires. Hanhai Xiongfeng is also loosely connected to Liang Yusheng's other novels set in the Song dynasty, including Kuangxia Tianjiao Monü, Mingdi Fengyun Lu, and Fengyun Leidian.

== Publication history ==
Hanhai Xiongfeng was first published as a serial in the Hong Kong newspaper Ta Kung Pao from 15 March 1968 to 21 January 1970. Subsequent reprints include a 1985 three-volume edition by Inner Mongolia People's Publishing House, a 1988 three-volume edition by China Folk Literature and Art Publishing House, a 1994 four-volume edition by Cosmos Books, and a 1996 two-volume edition by Guangdong Travel and Tourism Press.

== Plot summary ==
Set in 13th-century China during the wars between the Song, Jin and Mongol empires, the story follows Li Sinan, who sets out alone to find his father, Li Xihao, who had been captured by the Mongols two decades earlier. In Mongolia, he meets the Mengs, who are initially friendly towards him but abruptly depart after learning who his father is.

Li Sinan later meets a man claiming to be his father, now serving as a high-ranking Mongol officer. Feeling suspicious, he soon discovers that the man is an impostor, Yu Yizhong. With Yang Tao's help, he reunites with his dying father, who entrusts him with their family legacy and arranges for him to marry Yang Tao's sister, Yang Wan. While attempting to escape, they are attacked by the Mongols, and Yang Tao is killed.

Enduring separation, hardship and deception across the Gobi Desert, Li Sinan and Yang Wan are secretly aided by Minghui, Genghis Khan's daughter, during their escape from Mongolia. Upon returning to Shandong, Li Sinan learns of his mother's death and gets entangled in the rivalries of the wulin. With help from allies such as the Mengs and Chu Yunfeng, he defeats several schemers and becomes the new leader of the wulin.

As leader of the wulin, Li Sinan rallies martial artists at Mount Langya to form a militia to defend the Song Empire from Mongol and Jin invasions. After overcoming an ambush at Mount Feilong, he reconciles with Yang Wan, while Chu Yunfeng and Meng Mingxia fall in love during the campaign. Li Sinan later learns that the Mongol prince Tolui and the Jin royal adviser Yang Tianlei are colluding under a secret Mongol–Jin alliance targeting the militia. At one point, with Minghui's covert support, he kills Yu Yizhong to avenge his father.

Li Sinan and Yang Wan are later captured on a mission to the Jin capital Zhongdu, but their wulin allies stage a daring rescue, culminating in a climactic battle between the militia and the Mongol–Jin forces. During the battle, Chu Yunfeng slays Yang Tianlei, and the wulin's top martial artists defeat the Mongols' best fighter, Longxiang. As the invaders retreat, the heroes celebrate their hard-won victory and return home.

== Principal characters ==
- Li Sinan (李思南) – Li Xihao's son who becomes the leader of the wulin.
- Yang Wan (楊婉) – Yang Tao's sister and a descendant of the Yang Family Generals. She becomes Li Sinan's romantic partner.
- Minghui (明慧) – Genghis Khan's third daughter who admires Li Sinan and secretly helps him on various occasions.
- Chu Yunfeng (褚雲峰) – a member of the Heavenly Thunder Sect and Li Sinan's ally.
- Meng Shaogang (孟少剛) – a highly-skilled swordsman from Jiangnan.
- Meng Mingxia (孟明霞) – Meng Shaogang's daughter and Chu Yunfeng's romantic partner.
- Gu Hanxu (谷涵虛) – a member of the Heavenly Thunder Sect, and Li Sinan's ally.
- Yan Wan (嚴浣) – Meng Mingxia's cousin and Gu Hanxu's romantic partner.
- Tu Feng (屠鳳) – Tu Baicheng's daughter who succeeds her father as the leader of an outlaw band on Mount Langya.
- Shi Pu (石璞) – Tu Feng's second-in-command and romantic partner.
- Tu Long (屠龍) – Tu Feng's brother who plots with the Jin Empire to become leader of the wulin.
- Tolui (拖雷) – Genghis Khan's fourth son who leads the secret Mongol–Jin alliance.
- Longxiang (龍象) – a Buddhist monk serving as the Mongols' royal adviser and top fighter.
- Yu Yizhong (余一中) – a traitor impersonating Li Xihao and serving the Mongols.
- Yang Tianlei (陽天雷) – a traitor of the Heavenly Thunder Sect who serves as the Jin Empire's royal adviser.

== Reception and legacy ==
Hanhai Xiongfeng is recognised as a large-scale, historically-framed work among Liang Yusheng's novels, and noted for combining historical events and nationalist themes with traditional wuxia tropes.

Scholarly surveys of Liang Yusheng's novels note the unevenness in pacing and character development in some of his longer serialised novels in the late 1960s, attributing such issues to the practical demands of extended serialisation and concurrent projects; these production-related factors are frequently offered to explain lapses in narrative tightness despite the work's overall ambition.

Cultural coverage places Liang Yusheng among the more notable modern wuxia writers, citing Hanhai Xiongfeng as an example of his ambition in incorporating historical elements. It also notes that his later serialised novels are uneven in construction compared with his earlier shorter ones.
