= Deng Maoqi rebellion =

1448–1449 revolt in China

Date	1448–1449
Location	Fujian and Zhejiang
Result	Rebellion suppressed

Belligerents
Ming dynasty	Peasant rebels

Commanders and leaders
Zhang Kai	Deng Maoqi (executed); Deng Maoba (executed); Ye Zongliu †

The Deng Maoqi rebellion (Note: Simplified Chinese: 邓茂七之乱; traditional Chinese: 鄧茂七之亂; pinyin: Dèng Màoqī zhīluàn) was a peasant revolt that took place in 1448–1449 in the Ming dynasty during the reign of Emperor Yingzong. It occurred in the interior of Fujian in southeastern China. Led by the brothers Deng Maoqi and Deng Maoba, the tenants revolted against landlords, refusing to pay beyond what was stipulated in their leases. The local militia units were unable to suppress the uprising, and the army had to be sent in. In May 1449, the main forces of the rebels were defeated, and the scattered remnants were destroyed, but peace was not restored until 1452. In addition to the Deng Maoqi rebellion, there was also an uprising of miners who illegally extracted silver in the border regions of Fujian, Zhejiang, and Jiangxi from 1447 to 1449, led by Ye Zongliu.

== Background ==
In 1436, Emperor Yingzong of Ming's government converted grain taxes in some southern Chinese provinces into payments in silver, known as "golden flower silver" (金花銀; jinhuayin). Despite the increasing demand for silver for taxation and commercial transactions, the Ming government attempted to restrict its circulation by limiting silver mining and controlling its supply. In 1438, the government closed silver mines and prohibited small-scale silver mining along the border between Zhejiang and Fujian. Those who violated the ban were executed, but in an overpopulated region with high unemployment rates, many turned to illegal silver mining, leading to the rise of "mining bandits" (kuangzei). To combat this issue, the government organized a local militia in the mid-1440s through the baojia (watches and tithings) system, training able-bodied men from villages to fight and providing them with weapons stored in village armouries. Ye Zongliu (葉宗留), the leader of a group of illegal silver miners in the mountains between Zhejiang and Fujian, openly rebelled against the government in 1447. He gathered followers, formed an army, and declared himself king (wang).

== Course of the rebellion ==
In the interior of Fujian, the brothers Deng Maoqi (鄧茂七) and Deng Maoba (鄧茂八), who served as overseers in the baojia system, used their influence to support the tenants in their demands against the landlords. The tenants demanded the abolition of the "winter gift" (冬牲; dongsheng), an additional fee traditionally imposed on top of leases. In March 1448, the landlords asked the authorities to arrest the Deng brothers, but the Dengs resisted and retaliated by killing the county magistrate. Their rebellion quickly gained support, and by the end of the summer, they had already gained control of two county towns.

The government attempted to pacify the situation by forgiving unpaid taxes and granting a three-year exemption from the work obligation in the lijia system. (Note: The lijia (里甲; 'hundreds-and-tithings') system was the Ming dynasty's system for registering households and assigning taxes and corvée labor. Established in 1371, it organized households into groups of ten (jia) and one hundred (li) for administrative and service obligations.) However, the more radical faction of the rebels refused to surrender. Both sides, the rebels and the local authorities with the landowners, utilized the baojia organizations to forcibly enlist a significant number of peasants into the army, resulting in disruptions to agricultural work. The rebel army grew to several hundred thousand men and their leader, Deng Maoqi, declared himself king. (Note: According to Denis C. Twitchett and Tilemann Grimm, in The Cambridge History of China, he was known as the "King of Fujian" (Min wang); while according to Brook in The Confusions of Pleasure, he was referred to as the "King Who Eliminates Evil".) In the latter half of 1448, the conflict spread throughout Fujian, overwhelming the local militia's ability to handle the insurgents.

The government deployed troops led by the associate censor-in-chief Zhang Kai (張楷; 1398–1460) to suppress the rebels in September 1448. The decisive force, consisting of over fifty thousand soldiers, gathered in northeastern Jiangxi. They first targeted the rebels led by Ye Zongliu, who had also taken control of the mountains on the border of Fujian and Jiangxi. Ye was killed in December 1448, and the remaining rebels were forced to retreat north to southern Zhejiang. In August 1449, they were ultimately defeated.

In February 1449, the Deng brothers were captured and executed after their fellow soldier betrayed them. Their cousin then took over leadership of the rebellion, but was also soon betrayed by a village elder. By May 1449, the government army had successfully defeated the main forces of the rebels, but it took until 1452 for scattered rebel groups to be eliminated and for peace to be fully restored.

== Causes and consequences of defeat ==
According to Canadian historian Timothy Brook, the tenants lost the personal relationship with their largely absent landlords, instead viewing their relationship as purely contractual. As a result, they refused to make any payments that were not explicitly stated in their contract. Japanese historian Tanaka Masayoshi argues that the rebels made a mistake by trying to negotiate with the government, which had no interest in protecting them from local elites. Tanaka also notes that this was the first Chinese peasant uprising that was not motivated by officials' corruption, but rather by class relations. Despite the scale of their rebellion, the rebels did not receive widespread support. The local gentry remained loyal to the government, and the general population was satisfied with the promise of exemption from compulsory labor for three years. Even the miners, who had been heavily oppressed, were content with a reduction in compulsory levies and the abolition of death penalties for stealing silver. The successful suppression of the mining revolts may have led Emperor Yingzong to overestimate the strength of his troops. This overconfidence led him to personally command the army in a campaign against the Mongols in 1449, resulting in the Ming defeat at the Battle of Tumu and the capture of the Emperor himself.
