= Hong Kong Commercial Daily =

Chinese state-owned newspaper

- Type: Daily newspaper; state media
- Format: Broadsheet
- Owner(s): Shenzhen Press Group; Hong Kong Liaison Office
- Editor: Chen Xitian (陳鍚添)
- Founded: 1952
- Political alignment: Pro-Beijing
- Headquarters: Hong Kong
- Website: www.hkcd.com

The Hong Kong Commercial Daily (HKCD; Chinese: 香港商報) is a Chinese state-owned newspaper, published by the Shenzhen Press Group in broadsheet format in Hong Kong and dubbed “China’s international media window” by the central government. Established in 1952, it was the first financial newspaper in the Chinese language. It is one of the few newspapers authorized by the Hong Kong SAR government to publicize legal announcements, and also one of three Hong Kong newspaper allowed to be circulated freely in mainland China. It is controlled by the Hong Kong Liaison Office and Shenzhen Press Group, and has a branch office in Shenzhen.

== History ==
The HKCD was founded on 11 October 1952, at a price of 10 HK cents. Its stated aim was to serve as the voice of the local Hong Kong commerce with a focus on worldwide economies especially in Hong Kong and China. It also covered sports and on weekends offered columns and serialized short stories with pictures.

Early coverage of horse and dog racing was curtailed by the government in the early 70s, so as not to promote gambling, leading to a severe decline in circulation.

In December 1989, a majority shareholding was acquired by the Joint Publishing (HK) Company Limited (the joint company of The Commercial Press (H.K.) Ltd, Chung Hwa Book Co., and Joint Publishing) for HK$160 million.

In 1995, HKCD launched a mainland edition in cooperation with mainland publishing companies. Since 1996, an online version has been available.

In May 2005, the paper was upgraded priced at HK$3 in Hong Kong and overseas while in mainland China it sold for 3 yuan within Guangdong Province and 5 yuan in other provinces. The new version of the paper emphasizes business news from Hong Kong and the Pearl River Delta, along with some sports coverage.

In 2015, assistant editor-in-chief Long Zhenyang was placed under "political measures" for comments he made during the 2014 Hong Kong protests and regarding the demolition of churches in Zhejiang. For the following year, he did not work as an editor but was allowed to continue writing, and in February 2016 resigned and sought political asylum in the United States, comparing the sociopolitical climate in Chinese politics to the Cultural Revolution, and saying that "All hope for social reform and reforms to China’s political system, have now been extinguished."

== Editor ==
=== Cheng Xitian ===
Cheng Xitian is the current chief editor of the HKCD. Cheng was born on 8 February 1941 in Shanghai. Before he became the Chief Editor and Deputy of the HKCD, Cheng had been the editor of Shenzhen Publishing Group. At present, he is also a part-time professor in Renmin University of China and Wuhan University. He is a graduate from journalism of Renmin University in 1966 and has been working in the field of journalism for more than thirty years. Since he has written a number of newsletters, argumentative writings, reports, biography and prose etc., he was given the title "Unique Journalist" by Deng Xiaoping in 1992. On 26 March 1992, Cheng's Chinese publication (东方风来满眼春) highlighted the success of his career. This publication has won many awards in the press media of mainland China, e.g. "The first award of Chinese News" (中國新聞獎一等獎), "Special prize of Guangdong News" (廣東新聞獎特別獎), etc. In 2000, he was awarded the most honorable prize in the press in mainland (韜奮新聞獎).

== See also ==
- Newspapers of Hong Kong
- List of newspapers
- Hong Kong Audit Bureau of Circulations
