= Sun Yat-Sen University Press =

Chinese publishing company

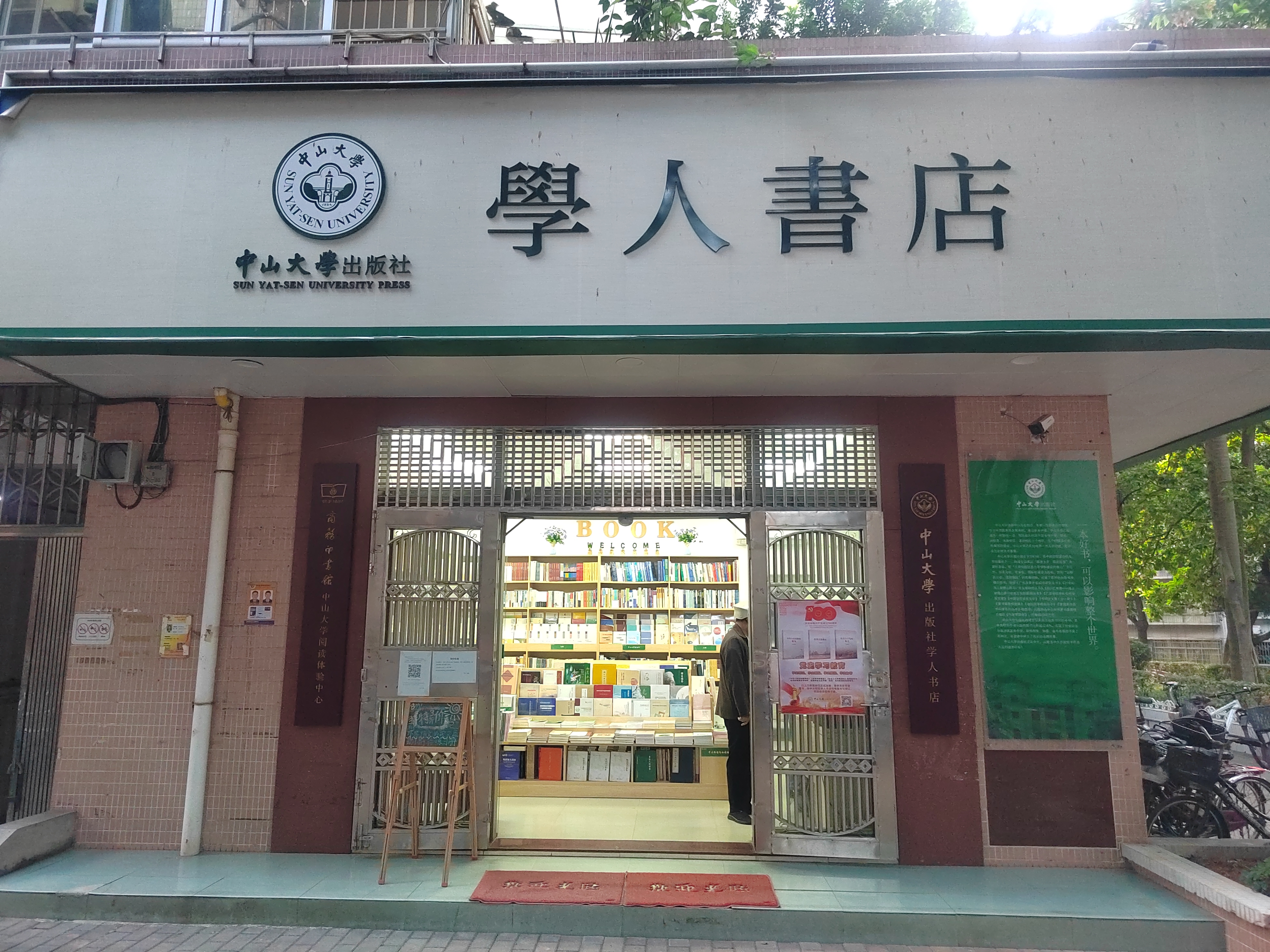
Sun Yat-sen University Press Scholars Bookstore

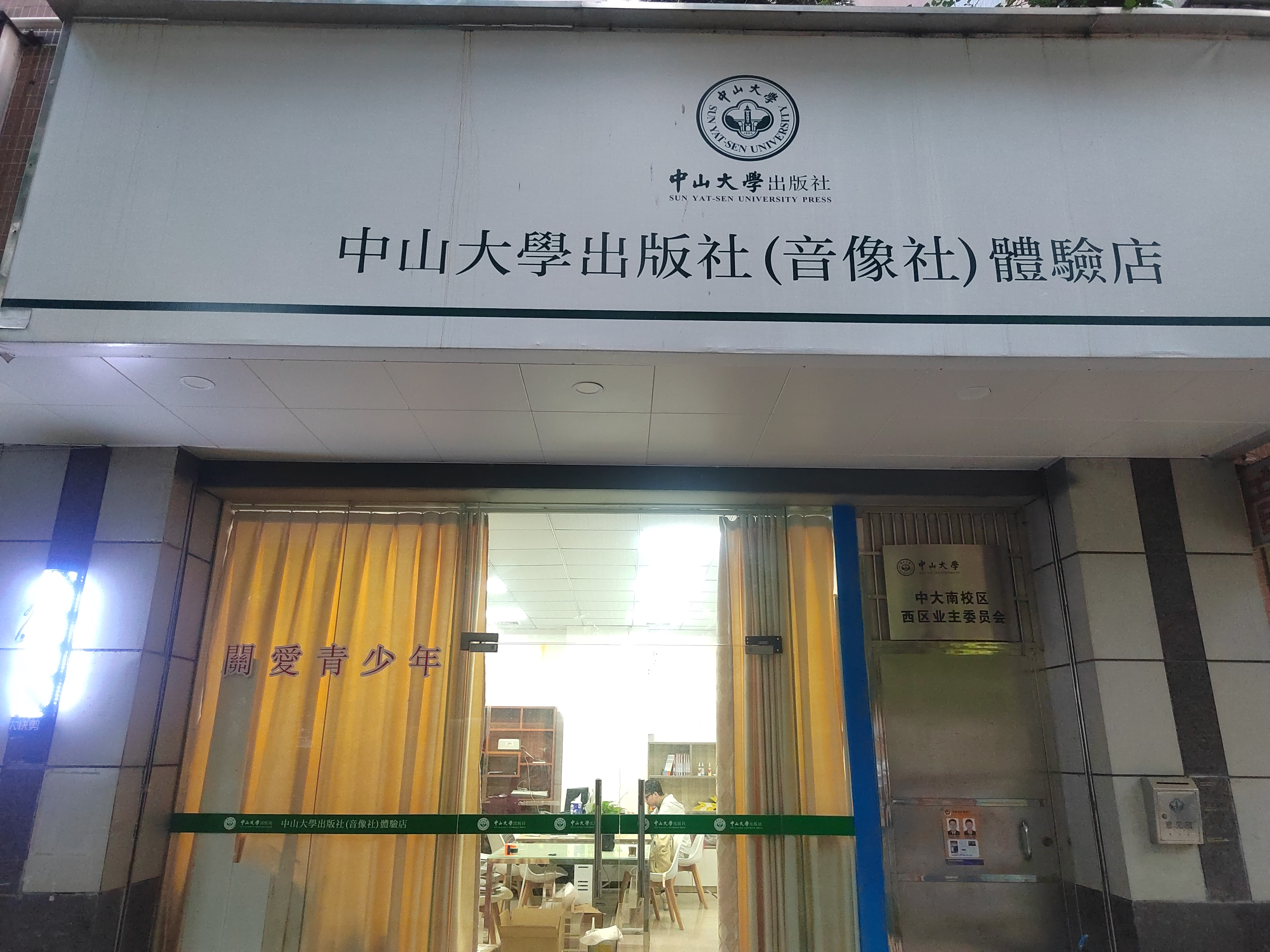
Sun Yat-sen University Press (Audio and Video dept.) Experience Store

Sun Yat-Sen University Press, or Zhongshan University Press (simplified Chinese: 中山大学出版社; traditional Chinese: 中山大學出版社; pinyin: Zhōngshān Dàxué Chūbǎnshè), is the publishing house of Sun Yat-Sen University, a top university in China. Founded in 1983, Sun Yat-Sen University Press has published more than 6,000 types of books. The company is located in Guangzhou, Guangdong Province, China; and supervised by the Ministry of Education of the People's Republic of China.

== History ==
In 1983, Sun Yat-sen University Press was established in Guangzhou, China.

In 1997, Sun Yat-sen University Audio-Visual Publishing House was incorporated into Sun Yat-sen University Press.

In 2007, it was renamed "Guangzhou Sun Yat-sen University Press Co., Ltd." and completed the transformation from a public institution to an enterprise company. In the same year, the sales of e-books ranked first in the province, and won the national "Digital Publishing Pioneer Award".

In 2015, the company won the "4th China University Press Book Award".

On August 18, 2023, the first "Guangdong Publishing Government Award Ceremony" was held in Guangzhou. The "Ming and Qing Dynasty Records Tibetan Historical Materials Series" published by Sun Yat-sen University Press won the "Book Award" and "Listen to China: Classic Works Audiobook Re-creation Project" won the "Audio-visual Electronic Network Publication Award".

== Current situation ==
Sun Yat-Sen University Press currently has 88 employees. Its departments include an administrative personnel department, a financial department, an editor-in-chief office, an editing center, a marketing center, a resource center, and a printing center. In addition, it also wholly owns Sun Yat-Sen University Audiovisual Publishing House and Sun Yat-Sen University Printing Factory Co., Ltd., and manages the business affairs of the Modern Computer magazine and Molecular Diagnosis magazine.

Since its establishment, Sun Yat-Sen University Press has published more than 6,000 types of books (about 500 per year, including reprints), among them, over a hundred have won national, ministerial, provincial and municipal book awards. The university textbooks, teaching references and academic monographs accounts for 70%. And more than 40% are published by university teachers and scholars.

Recently, Sun Yat-sen University Press has published a series of hot books, including: "Research Series on Guangdong's 40 Years of Reform and Opening-up", "Research Series on the 21st Century Maritime Silk Road and Guangdong's Development", "Guangdong Province Excellent Social Scientists Collection", "Family Doctor Medical Science Series", etc., which have received good responses. Book "Administrative Management" has been printed more than 300,000 copies.

Books published by Sun Yat-sen University Press are also available internationally.

== Service Areas ==
The publishing areas of Sun Yat-sen University Press include cultural education, social sciences, textbooks and supplementary materials, academic monographs and literary novels, etc. The purpose is to serve the university and the society.
