= Muye Liuxing =

1972 wuxia novel by Liang Yusheng

- Author: Liang Yusheng
- Original title: 牧野流星
- Language: Chinese
- Genre: Wuxia
- Set in: 19th-century China
- Publisher: New Evening Post
- Publication date: 16 February 1972 – 13 January 1975
- Publication place: Hong Kong
- Media type: Print
- ISBN: 9787306043900
- Preceded by: Youjian Jianghu
- Followed by: Tanzhi Jinglei

Muye Liuxing
- Chinese: 牧野流星
- Literal meaning: Shooting Stars over the Grasslands
Transcriptions
Standard Mandarin
- Hanyu Pinyin: Mù Yě Liú Xīng
Yue: Cantonese
- Jyutping: Muk^{6} Je^{5} Lau^{4} Sing^{1}

Zheji Chensha Lu
- Traditional Chinese: 折戟沉沙錄
- Simplified Chinese: 折戟沉沙录
- Literal meaning: Chronicle of Broken Spears Beneath the Sands
Transcriptions
Standard Mandarin
- Hanyu Pinyin: Zhé Jǐ Chén Shā Lù
Yue: Cantonese
- Jyutping: Zit^{3} Gik^{1} Cam^{4} Saa^{1} Luk^{6}

Muye Liuxing (牧野流星), literally Shooting Stars over the Grasslands, is a wuxia novel by Liang Yusheng. It was first published as a serial between 16 February 1972 and 13 January 1975 in the Hong Kong newspaper New Evening Post. The novel is also known by an alternative title, Zheji Chensha Lu (折戟沉沙錄; "Chronicle of Broken Spears Beneath the Sands").

Set in 19th-century China during the Qing dynasty, the story follows the swordsman Meng Hua as he uncovers his true parentage and becomes entangled in conflicts between martial artists, rebels, and government forces. The novel is noted for its broad geographical scope and for blending adventure with reflection on loyalty, identity, and moral responsibility. The novel is the second instalment in a tetralogy that concludes Liang Yusheng's Tianshan series, continuing from after Youjian Jianghu, and followed by Tanzhi Jinglei and Juesai Chuanfeng Lu.

== Publication history ==
Muye Liuxing was first published as a serial between 16 February 1972 and 13 January 1975 in the Hong Kong newspaper New Evening Post. Subsequent reprints include a four-volume edition by Ningxia Literature and Art Publishing House, a 1988 four-volume edition by China Film Press, a 1992 four-volume edition by Shenzhen Publishing House, a 1996 three-volume edition by Guangdong Travel and Tourism Press, 1996 and 2009 four-volume editions by Cosmos Books, and 2012 and 2019 three-volume editions by the Sun Yat-Sen University Press.

== Plot summary ==
The story takes place in 19th-century China during the Qing dynasty. Yang Hua, the son of Yun Ziluo and Meng Yuanchao, has trained for a decade in martial arts under his master, Dan Qiusheng. Unaware of his family background, he believes that Yang Mu is his father.

After surviving a deadly battle against his master's enemies, Yang Hua chances upon martial arts manuals left behind by the 15th-century swordsman Zhang Danfeng and learns the skills, boosting his combat prowess. He then disguises himself as a Qing army officer and travels to the Qaidam Basin to take revenge on Meng Yuanchao, whom he blames for his family's misfortunes.

Along the way, Yang Hua meets Jin Biyi, the daughter of Jin Zhuliu and Shi Hongying, and falls in love with her. With her help, he learns the truth about his family, leading to a reunion with his father. He also renames himself "Meng Hua" to reflect his true parentage.

Meng Hua later journeys to Tibet, where he uncovers a plot by the Qing government to provoke conflict among the Tibetan Buddhist schools, and helps to broker peace between the schools. He then joins the Mount Heaven Sect as a nominal member, and assists the Kongtong Sect in exposing internal corruption, helping his master Dan Qiusheng clear his name and become Kongtong's leader.

In the final chapters, Meng Hua and Jin Biyi travel across the steppes of Xinjiang, aiding nomadic tribes and helping the rebels resist the oppression of the Qing government. Their adventures earn them the epithet "shooting stars over the grasslands", symbolising their wandering yet righteous lives on the frontier.

== Principal characters ==
- Meng Hua (孟華) / Yang Hua (楊華) – Yun Ziluo and Meng Yuanchao's son.
- Jin Biyi (金碧漪) – Jin Zhuliu and Shi Hongying's daughter, and Meng Hua's romantic partner.
- Dan Qiusheng (丹丘生) – Meng Hua's master who becomes the Kongtong Sect's leader.
- Meng Yuanchao (孟元超) – Meng Hua's father and the leader of the anti-Qing rebels at the Qaidam Basin.
- Duan Choushi (段仇世) – an eccentric martial artist who initially trained Meng Hua.
- Tang Jingtian (唐經天) – the Mount Heaven Sect's leader whose role links the tetralogy to the earlier novels of the Tianshan series.
- Yang Yan (楊炎) – Yun Ziluo and Yang Mu's son, and Meng Hua's half-brother.
- Dongzhenzi (洞真子) – a Kongtong Sect elder and Dan Qiusheng's rival.

== Reception and legacy ==
Muye Liuxing is one of Liang Yusheng's more significant novels published in the later or "mature" phase of his writing career, noted for deepening the emotional, thematic, and geographical scope of the narratives. The Dictionary of Modern Chinese Wuxia Fiction observes that the novel expands on psychological struggle, intergenerational conflict, and the hero's moral burden.

Muye Liuxing is also positioned as a work in which Liang Yusheng balances action with introspection, and pays closer attention to legacy, identity, and the shadows of earlier tragedies.

On Douban, one edition records an average rating of 6.8/10 from nearly 300 users, while another is rated 7.3/10. Reviews praise the novel's scenic descriptions, layered character relationships, and poetic prose. At the same time, they note that the pacing and subplots can hinder narrative momentum.

In the broader context of modern wuxia literature, Muye Liuxing is often cited as an example of the development of the "cultured swordsman" (文士型侠客) archetype in wuxia novels.
