= Juesai Chuanfeng Lu =

1975 wuxia novel by Liang Yusheng

- Author: Liang Yusheng
- Original title: 絕塞傳烽錄
- Language: Chinese
- Genre: Wuxia
- Set in: 19th-century China
- Publisher: New Evening Post
- Publication date: 12 February 1975 – 10 April 1978
- Publication place: Hong Kong
- Media type: Print
- ISBN: 9786263755109
- Preceded by: Tanzhi Jinglei
- Followed by: Jianwang Chensi

Juesai Chuanfeng Lu
- Traditional Chinese: 絕塞傳烽錄
- Simplified Chinese: 绝塞传烽录
- Literal meaning: Chronicle of the Frontier Beacons
Transcriptions
Standard Mandarin
- Hanyu Pinyin: Jué Sài Chuán Fēng Lù
Yue: Cantonese
- Jyutping: Zyut^{6} Coi^{3} Cyun^{4} Fung^{1} Luk^{6}

Juesai Chuanfeng Lu (絕塞傳烽錄), literally Chronicle of the Frontier Beacons, is a wuxia novel by Liang Yusheng. It was first published as a serial between 12 February 1975 and 10 April 1978 in the Hong Kong newspaper New Evening Post. The novel is the final instalment in a tetralogy that concludes Liang Yusheng's Tianshan series and is preceded by Youjian Jianghu, Muye Liuxing and Tanzhi Jinglei.

Set in 19th-century China during the Qing dynasty, the story concludes a multi-generational saga that explores themes of loyalty, love, vengeance and moral duty within the wulin. Juesai Chuanfeng Lu is generally regarded by critics as representative of Liang Yusheng's late-career writing style, which is marked by greater psychological depth and a reflective tone that distinguishes it from his earlier adventure-driven works.

== Publication history ==
Juesai Chuanfeng Lu was first published as a serial between 12 February 1975 and 10 April 1978 in the Hong Kong newspaper New Evening Post. Subsequent reprints include a 1988 two-volume edition by the Minzu University of China Press, a 1993 edition by Shenzhen Publishing House, a 1996 edition by Guangdong Travel and Tourism Press, a 1996 two-volume edition by Cosmos Books, and a 2012 two-volume edition by the Sun Yat-Sen University Press.

== Plot summary ==
The story is set in 19th-century China during the Qing dynasty. Yang Yan travels to Beijing to reunite with his father Yang Mu, an imperial guard who secretly conspires with the Yuwen family to seize control of a private security company. Their plot is exposed by Yang Yan's maternal cousin Qi Shijie and friend Zhang Xiaoyao, leading Yang Yan to leave in disappointment over his father's deceit.

Pursued by the Mount Heaven Sect for his past offences, Yang Yan sets out to surrender himself. Meanwhile, Long Lingzhu is captured by Mount Heaven Sect elders Shi Tianxing and Ding Zhaoming, but is rescued by Jiang Shangyun, a son of Jiang Haitian and Gu Zhonglian. Shi Tianxing's son Shi Qingquan, who had attempted to sexually assault Long Lingzhu, later commits suicide when his crime is exposed, driving his humiliated father to do the same. The Mount Heaven Sect is then attacked by the Yuwen family, but manages to fend off the attackers. The sect's acting leader, Tang Jiayuan, promises that whoever defeats Yuwen Bo, the head of the Yuwen family, will be the Mount Heaven Sect's next leader.

As Qing government forces battle anti-Qing rebels and Kazakh tribes in Xinjiang, Yang Yan infiltrates the Qing army camp to assassinate the commander and unexpectedly encounters his father Yang Mu. After Yang Mu is betrayed by his followers, he is forced to fight alongside his son against the Qing forces. Although the anti-Qing rebels show up to help them, Yang Mu is mortally wounded and dies after reconciling with his son.

Yang Yan and his allies later assault the Yuwen family's base to save Leng Bing'er, who has been captured. They emerge victorious, killing Yuwen Bo in battle. After being rescued, Leng Bing'er decides to be a Buddhist nun but still joins the anti-Qing rebels. In the aftermath, Yang Yan brings Long Lingzhu to her dying grandfather, who entrusts her to his care. The Mount Heaven Sect then invites Yang Yan to serve as their leader since he had defeated Yuwen Bo. Long Lingzhu declines to follow Yang Yan to Mount Heaven, instead choosing to part ways with him for seven years as a test of their love.

== Principal characters ==
- Yang Yan (楊炎) – Yun Ziluo and Yang Mu's son who was trained by Tang Jingtian and Long Zeling.
- Qi Shijie (齊世杰) – Yang Yan's maternal cousin and ally.
- Leng Bing'er (冷冰兒) – a Mount Heaven Sect swordswoman who forms a complicated romantic bond with Yang Yan.
- Long Lingzhu (龍靈珠) – Long Zeling's maternal granddaughter and Yang Yan's romantic partner.
- Yang Dagu (楊大姑) – Yang Mu's sister and Qi Shijie's mother.
- Yang Mu (楊牧) – Yang Yan's father who serves as a high-ranking imperial guard and conspires with the Yuwen family.
- Miao Changfeng (繆長風) – Yang Yan's godfather.
- Yuwen Bo (宇文博) – the primary antagonist and head of the Yuwen family.
- Meng Hua (孟華) – Yun Ziluo and Meng Yuanchao's son, and Yang Yan's half-brother.
- Meng Yuanchao (孟元超) – the leader of the anti-Qing rebels at the Qaidam Basin.
- Tang Jiayuan (唐加源) – Tang Jingtian and Gui Bing'e's son who serves as the Mount Heaven Sect's acting leader.
- Shi Tianxing (石天行) and Ding Zhaoming (丁兆鳴) – two Mount Heaven Sect elders sent to arrest Yang Yan and punish him for his past offences.
- Shi Qingquan (石清泉) – Shi Tianxing's son who attempts to sexually assault Long Lingzhu.
- Zhang Xiaoyao (張逍遙), nicknamed "Happy Zhang" (快活張) – a highly-skilled thief who allies with the heroes to expose the Yuwen family's plot.
- Jiang Shangyun (江上雲) – Jiang Haitian and Gu Zhonglian's son who helps to save Long Lingzhu.

== Reception and legacy ==
Juesai Chuanfeng Lu is one of Liang Yusheng's novels published in the later or "mature" phase of his writing career, during which he places more emphasis on intergenerational conflict, moral ambiguity, and psychological depth as opposed to his earlier, more action-driven novels. The novel is noted for continuing themes developed across the tetralogy — inherited grievances, divided loyalties, and the costs of vengeance.

Critical responses are mixed. Commentators praise the novel for its emotional depth, character development, and the way it brings two generations of a storyline to closure, while also panning its pacing, occasional continuity lapses, and subplots which break the narrative momentum. The novel is also cited as an example of the development of the "cultured swordsman" (文士型侠客) archetype in wuxia novels.

On Douban, the novel receives mixed to positive reviews, with readers commending the novel's scenic passages, moral complexity, and the emotional resolution of a long-running plot. However, they also point out its uneven pacing and occasional verbosity.
