= Xiagu Danxin =

1967 wuxia novel by Liang Yusheng

- Author: Liang Yusheng
- Original title: 俠骨丹心
- Language: Chinese
- Genre: Wuxia
- Set in: 18th-century China
- Publisher: New Evening Post
- Publication date: 5 October 1967 – 20 June 1969
- Publication place: Hong Kong
- Media type: Print
- ISBN: 9786263755567
- Preceded by: Fenglei Zhen Jiuzhou
- Followed by: Youjian Jianghu

Xiagu Danxin
- Traditional Chinese: 俠骨丹心
- Simplified Chinese: 侠骨丹心
- Literal meaning: Chivalrous Bones and Loyal Heart
Transcriptions
Standard Mandarin
- Hanyu Pinyin: Xiá Gǔ Dān Xīn
Yue: Cantonese
- Jyutping: Hap^{6} Gwat^{1} Daan^{1} Sam^{1}

Xiagu Danxin (俠骨丹心), literally Chivalrous Bones and Loyal Heart, is a wuxia novel by Liang Yusheng. It was first published as a serial between 5 October 1967 and 20 June 1969 in the Hong Kong newspaper New Evening Post. It is the tenth instalment in the Tianshan series, serving as a sequel to Fenglei Zhen Jiuzhou, and followed by a tetralogy starting with Youjian Jianghu.

Set in 18th-century China, the novel follows Jin Zhuliu — the son of Jin Shiyi and Gu Zhihua, the protagonists of Yunhai Yugong Yuan — as he roams the wulin and becomes entangled in conflicts between rebel forces, the Qing government, and rival sects. The story intertwines martial-arts adventure with themes of loyalty, integrity, and resistance to tyranny, which are characteristic of Liang Yusheng's later or "mature" phase of writing.

Xiagu Danxin has been recognised by scholars and critics as one of Liang Yusheng's more cohesive ensemble narratives, exemplifying his blend of historical realism and idealised chivalric ethics. Retrospective commentaries in Hong Kong and Taiwanese cultural journals regard the work as representative of late-1960s newspaper serial fiction and a reflection of changing ideals within modern wuxia literature.

== Publication history ==
Xiagu Danxin was first published as a serial between 5 October 1967 and 20 June 1969 in the Hong Kong newspaper New Evening Post. Subsequent reprints include a 1986 four-volume edition by Guangdong Arts Publishing Company, a 1988 three-volume edition by Liaoning–Shenyang Publishing House, 1993 and 1996 three-volume editions by Cosmos Books, a 1996 two-volume edition by Guangdong Travel and Tourism Press, and a 2012 two-volume edition by the Sun Yat-Sen University Press.

== Plot summary ==
The novel is set in 18th-century China during the Qing dynasty. Jin Zhuliu, the son of Jin Shiyi and Gu Zhihua, has inherited his parents' fighting skills, and is roaming the wulin in search of adventure. He gains fame after foiling an assassination attempt on Jiang Haitian, his father's apprentice and the leader of anti-Qing forces in the wulin.

Shi Baidu, the Six Harmonies Clan's chief, betrays the wulin by allying with the corrupt Qing official Sa Fuding. Jin Zhuliu befriends Li Nanxing, the son of Kalanni and Li Fusheng, and becomes sworn brothers with him. They join forces with their allies to disrupt Sa Fuding's schemes to control the wulin. Jin Zhuliu also falls in love with Shi Hongying, Shi Baidu's sister who secretly opposes her brother's partnership with the Qing government.

Shi Baidu pretends to arrange for Shi Hongying to marry the Qing general Shuai Mengxiong in a bid to lure Li Nanxing, Jin Zhuliu, and the anti-Qing forces into a trap at Xichang. Jin Zhuliu, Li Nanxing, Gongsun Yan, and others work together to save Shi Hongying, and confront Shi Baidu and the Qing government forces at Xichang. Shi Baidu takes his own life after his defeat. Li Nanxing and Gongsun Yan fall off a cliff during the battle and are believed to be dead.

Some time later, the disbanded Heavenly Demonic Cult suddenly re-emerges and terrorises the wulin, apparently under Li Nanxing's leadership. When Jin Zhuliu investigates, he realises that the cult leader is somebody impersonating Li Nanxing, and that the Li Nanxing and Gongsun Yan have survived their fall. They team up to expose the impostor and bring about the cult's final dissolution, and then continue to join their wulin allies in opposing the repressive Qing government.

The story ends with Jin Zhuliu marrying Shi Hongying and Li Nanxing marrying Gongsun Yan, both couples receiving the blessings of their wulin peers.

== Principal characters ==
- Jin Zhuliu (金逐流) – Jin Shiyi and Gu Zhihua's son.
- Shi Hongying (史紅英) – Shi Baidu's sister and Jin Zhuliu's romantic partner.
- Li Nanxing (厲南星) – Li Fusheng and Kalanni's son who becomes Jin Zhuliu's sworn brother.
- Gongsun Yan (公孫燕) – a member of the Red Tassel Society and Li Nanxing's romantic partner.
- Shi Baidu (史白都) – the Six Harmonies Clan's chief who forms an alliance with the Qing government.
- Jiang Haitian (江海天) – Jin Shiyi's apprentice and the leader of anti-Qing forces in the wulin.
- Sa Fuding (薩福鼎) – the corrupt director of palace affairs in the Qing government.
- Wen Daozhuang (文道莊) – a Qing imperial guard and Jin Zhuliu's nemesis.
- Shuai Mengxiong (帥孟雄) – the commander of Qing government forces in Xichang.

== Reception and legacy ==
Xiagu Danxin is regarded by scholars as one of the novels written by Liang Yusheng in the later or "mature" phase of his writing career. Critics have noted that the novel continues the Tianshan series and showcases Liang Yusheng's style of blending historical events with elements of martial-arts chivalry.

Contemporary and later commentaries have described Xiagu Danxin as one of Liang Yusheng's more cohesive ensemble narratives, balancing martial-arts elements with themes of loyalty and integrity.

== Adaptations ==
The novel was adapted into the 1971 Hong Kong film The Patriotic Knights by Great Wall Movie Enterprises, starring Fu Qi as Jin Zhuliu and Wang Baozhen as Shi Hongying.

In 2006, the novel was adapted into the television series The Patriotic Knights. Unlike the novel which is set in the Qing dynasty, the series is set in the Ming dynasty, and some characters' names and roles have been significantly altered. It starred Chen Long as Jin Zhuliu, Stephanie Hsiao as Shi Hongying, Wallace Chung as Li Nanxing, and He Meitian as Zhong Yanyan (Gongsun Yan).
