= Yunhai Yugong Yuan =

1961 wuxia novel by Liang Yusheng

- Author: Liang Yusheng
- Original title: 雲海玉弓緣
- Language: Chinese
- Genre: Wuxia
- Set in: 18th-century China
- Publisher: New Evening Post
- Publication date: 12 October 1961 – 9 August 1963
- Publication place: Hong Kong
- Media type: Print
- ISBN: 9789861465708
- Preceded by: Bingchuan Tiannü Zhuan
- Followed by: Binghe Xijian Lu

Yunhai Yugong Yuan
- Traditional Chinese: 雲海玉弓緣
- Simplified Chinese: 云海玉弓缘
- Literal meaning: Romance of the Cloud Sea and Jade Bow
Transcriptions
Standard Mandarin
- Hanyu Pinyin: Yún Hǎi Yù Gōng Yuán
Yue: Cantonese
- Jyutping: Wan^{4} Hoi^{2} Juk^{6} Gung^{1} Jyun^{4}

Yunhai Yugong Yuan (雲海玉弓緣), literally Romance of the Cloud Sea and Jade Bow, is a wuxia novel by Liang Yusheng. It was first published as a serial in the Hong Kong newspaper New Evening Post from 12 October 1961 to 9 August 1963. The novel is the seventh instalment in the Tianshan series. Within the series, it is considered the second part of a trilogy starting with Bingchuan Tiannü Zhuan and ending with Binghe Xijian Lu.

Set in 18th-century China during the Qing dynasty, the novel continues the adventures of Jin Shiyi, a character first introduced in Bingchuan Tiannü Zhuan. Jin Shiyi gets entangled in a love triangle with Gu Zhihua and Li Shengnan, while confronting the lingering feuds and moral dilemmas of the wulin.

Yunhai Yugong Yuan is regarded by scholars as one of Liang Yusheng's works from the "mature" phase of his writing career, and a representative example of the "new school" wuxia genre that emerged in the mid-1950s in Hong Kong. The novel has inspired several film and television adaptations, including the 1966 film The Jade Bow and the 2002 television series Lofty Waters, Verdant Bow.

== Publication history ==
Yunhai Yugong Yuan was first published as a serial in the Hong Kong newspaper New Evening Post from 12 October 1961 to 9 August 1963. Subsequent reprints include 1984 and 1994 two-volume editions by Fujian People's Publishing House, 1985 and 1996 two-volume editions by Guangdong Travel and Tourism Press, 1992 and 1999 three-volume editions by Cosmos Books, and 2012, 2014 and 2021 three-volume editions by the Sun Yat-Sen University Press.

== Plot summary ==
Set in 18th-century China during the Qing dynasty, the story follows Jin Shiyi, a wandering martial artist first introduced in the previous novel. While travelling near Mount Mang, he meets Gu Zhihua, an apprentice of Lü Siniang and a member of the Mount Mang Sect. They fall in love, though Jin Shiyi remains unaware that Gu Zhihua is the long-lost daughter of Meng Shentong, a ruthless and power-hungry martial artist seeking to dominate the wulin.

Jin Shiyi also meets Li Shengnan, who traces her martial arts lineage to Qiao Beiming and seeks vengeance on Meng Shentong for murdering her family. After saving Jin Shiyi's life, Li Shengnan persuades him to help her locate Qiao Beiming's hidden treasures — a jade bow, a suit of armour, a sword, and a martial arts manual — to strengthen her for revenge. During this time, Li Shengnan becomes romantically attracted to Jin Shiyi, creating a love triangle between her, Jin Shiyi, and Gu Zhihua.

Gu Zhihua is expelled from the Mount Mang Sect because of her father's crimes. Though she later helps the Mount Mang Sect fend off attacks by their enemies, she remains an outcast. United by hardship, Jin Shiyi grows closer to Gu Zhihua before departing with Li Shengnan to search for the treasures. Meng Shentong tracks them down and seizes half of the manual, gaining new powers.

Three years later, Meng Shentong challenges the orthodox sects to prove that he is the most powerful fighter in the wulin. The Mount Mang Sect, impressed by Gu Zhihua's integrity in standing up to her father, reinstates her. Jin Shiyi and Li Shengnan later infiltrate Beijing to rescue their captured allies, but Meng Shentong tracks them down and injures Jin Shiyi in battle. They are saved by Tang Xiaolan, the Mount Heaven Sect's leader who arranges to settle the conflict through a contest at Shaolin Monastery.

During the contest, Meng Shentong attempts to kill his rivals with hidden explosives. However, Jin Shiyi foils the plot, and Meng Shentong takes his own life after being defeated and cornered. Gu Zhihua becomes the new leader of the Mount Mang Sect, while Li Shengnan, consumed by jealousy, poisons Gu Zhihua and leaves. Seeing herself as Qiao Beiming's heir, Li Shengnan duels Tang Xiaolan to settle a 15th-century feud between Qiao Beiming and Zhang Danfeng, whom the Mount Heaven Sect traces its lineage to.

Li Shengnan wins the duel but suffers self-inflicted fatal injuries after using a risky move. Before dying, she extracts a promise from Jin Shiyi to marry her in exchange for the antidote to save Gu Zhihua. Jin Shiyi honours Li Shengnan's request, and Gu Zhihua is cured. Feeling burdened by the guilt of letting down Li Shengnan despite her love for him, Jin Shiyi vows never to marry again and parts ways with Gu Zhihua.

== Principal characters ==
- Jin Shiyi (金世遺) – an antisocial drifter who has matured through his experiences to become a heroic martial artist.
- Li Shengnan (厲勝男) – a descendant of Li Kangtian who is driven by revenge against Meng Shentong. At the expense of her life, she becomes the top fighter in the wulin after defeating the Mount Heaven Sect's leader Tang Xiaolan.
- Gu Zhihua (谷之華) – Meng Shentong's long-lost daughter and Lü Siniang's apprentice. In contrast with her father, she is known for her morally upright character and eventually becomes the Mount Mang Sect's leader.
- Meng Shentong (孟神通) – the ruthless main antagonist whose quest for power in the wulin drives the central conflict in the story.

== Reception and legacy ==
Yunhai Yugong Yuan is regarded by scholars for its significance in the evolution of the "new school" wuxia genre that emerged in Hong Kong in the 1950s. An master's thesis by Ching-chih Chen observes that the novel's themes of the collision of good and evil, the depiction of love and moral choice, and its narrative complexity, set it apart from earlier wuxia novels.

While contemporaneous reviews are scarce, literary scholars note that the novel continues to generate interest in Chinese-language studies and remains a focal text in discussions of mid-20th-century serialised wuxia novels from Hong Kong.

The novel's cultural legacy was extended further when it was adapted into the 1966 film The Jade Bow and subsequently into other films and television series. Film historian Stephen Teo identifies the 1960s as emblematic of a wave of "new school" wuxia films in Hong Kong, in which studios increasingly turned to wuxia novels for source material.

== Adaptations ==
=== Films ===
| Year | Title | Production | Main cast |
|---|---|---|---|
| 1966 | The Jade Bow | Great Wall Movie Enterprises (Hong Kong) | Chen Sisi, Wang Baozhen, Fu Qi |
| 1984 | Long Road to Gallantry | Shaw Brothers Studio (Hong Kong) | Kenny Ho, Rosamund Kwan, Kara Wai |

=== Television ===
| Year | Title | Production | Main cast |
|---|---|---|---|
| 1984 | Jade Bow Connection | ATV (Hong Kong) | Savio Tsang, Iris Ma, Choi Sin-ngai |
| 1988 | The Tian Shan Hero | CTV (Taiwan) | Vickey Liu, Chou Shao-Tung, Regina Tsang |
| 2002 | Lofty Waters, Verdant Bow | TVB (Hong Kong) | Raymond Lam, Michelle Ye, Rain Lee |
