= Youjian Jianghu =

1969 wuxia novel by Liang Yusheng

- Author: Liang Yusheng
- Original title: 游劍江湖
- Language: Chinese
- Genre: Wuxia
- Set in: 19th-century China
- Publisher: New Evening Post
- Publication date: 1 July 1969 – 4 February 1972
- Publication place: Hong Kong
- Media type: Print
- ISBN: 9787805426037
- Preceded by: Xiagu Danxin
- Followed by: Muye Liuxing

Youjian Jianghu
- Traditional Chinese: 游劍江湖
- Simplified Chinese: 游剑江湖
- Literal meaning: Wandering Swordsman in the Jianghu
Transcriptions
Standard Mandarin
- Hanyu Pinyin: Yóu Jiàn Jiāng Hú
Yue: Cantonese
- Jyutping: Jau^{4} Gim^{3} Gong^{1} Wu^{4}

Tan Jia Ge
- Traditional Chinese: 彈鋏歌
- Simplified Chinese: 弹铗歌
- Literal meaning: Ballad of the Strummed Sword
Transcriptions
Standard Mandarin
- Hanyu Pinyin: Tán Jiá Gé
Yue: Cantonese
- Jyutping: Daan^{6} Gaap^{3} Go^{1}

Youjian Jianghu (游劍江湖), literally Wandering Swordsman in the Jianghu, is a wuxia novel by Liang Yusheng. It was first published as a serial between 1 July 1969 and 4 February 1972 in the Hong Kong newspaper New Evening Post. The novel is also known by an alternative title, Tan Jia Ge (彈鋏歌; "Ballad of the Strummed Sword").

Set in 19th-century China during the Qing dynasty, the story follows martial artists who become entangled in struggles involving loyalty, love, and rebellion in the wulin. The novel is the first instalment in a tetralogy that concludes Liang Yusheng's Tianshan series, continuing from after Xiagu Danxin. It is followed by Muye Liuxing, Tanzhi Jinglei, and Juesai Chuanfeng Lu. Critics have described Youjian Jianghu as one of Liang Yusheng's more introspective later works, and a representative example of the development of the "cultured swordsman" (文士型侠客) archetype in modern wuxia literature.

== Publication history ==
Youjian Jianghu was first published as a serial between 1 July 1969 and 4 February 1972 in the Hong Kong newspaper New Evening Post. Subsequent reprints include a 1985 four-volume edition by Ningxia Literature and Art Publishing House, a 1986 four-volume edition by Tibetan Ancient Classics Publishing House, a 1988 four-volume edition by Sichuan Literature and Art Publishing House, a 1993 four-volume edition by Cosmos Books, a 1996 three-volume edition by Guangdong Travel and Tourism Press, and 2012 and 2019 three-volume editions by the Sun Yat-Sen University Press.

== Plot summary ==
The story is set in 19th-century China during the Qing dynasty. Meng Yuanchao, a member of an anti-Qing rebel group, was in love with Yun Ziluo. Seven years ago, he was presumed dead after disappearing on a mission. Pregnant with Meng Yuanchao's child at the time, Yun Ziluo had married Yang Mu, a prominent martial artist. Yang Mu had then raised Yun Ziluo and Meng Yuanchao's son, Yang Hua, as his own. When Yun Ziluo later learns that Meng Yuanchao is still alive and has become a rebel leader and well-known figure in the wulin, she sets out to find him.

Yang Mu, realising that his wife still loves Meng Yuanchao, fakes his death in a bid to gain her sympathy, but she leaves him nonetheless. Yun Ziluo sees Meng Yuanchao in Suzhou and secretly helps him fend off enemies before departing for Lake Tai. On her journey, she meets the wandering martial artist Miao Changfeng, who quietly falls in love with her.

Consumed by jealousy, Yang Mu pledges allegiance to the Qing government, and plots with the imperial guard commander Beigong Wang to ruin Meng Yuanchao's reputation in the wulin. Meanwhile, Yang Hua is abducted by the eccentric martial artists Bu Tiandiao and Duan Choushi, who recognise his aptitude for martial arts and train him as their apprentice.

Later, the major characters converge at a ceremony on Mount Tai held by the Fusang Sect to elect their new leader. Meng Yuanchao helps his friend, Lin Wushuang, become the sect's leader. Yang Mu then publicly accuses Meng Yuanchao of stealing his wife, but fails to prove it and turns violently against Yun Ziluo. She is rescued by Meng Yuanchao and Miao Changfeng, though the latter must relinquish his love for her upon learning of her past. Yun Ziluo gives birth to a second son, Yang Yan, whose father is Yang Mu, and later joins an effort to rescue Yang Hua from captivity in Yunnan.

In the final act, Beigong Wang leads Qing government forces to attack Meng Yuanchao and the rebels at Xiaojinchuan. Meng Yuanchao is gravely wounded but saved by Yun Ziluo. Miao Changfeng kills Beigong Wang in combat, yet both he and Yun Ziluo are poisoned. Yun Ziluo sacrifices her life to save Miao Changfeng by sucking out the poison from his wound. Grief-stricken, Miao Changfeng vows to care for Yang Yan to repay Yun Ziluo's kindness.

== Principal characters ==
- Yun Ziluo (雲紫蘿) – a martial artist and Meng Yuanchao's former lover who married Yang Mu after Meng Yuanchao's disappearance.
- Meng Yuanchao (孟元超) – Yun Ziluo's ex-lover and the leader of the anti-Qing rebels at Xiaojinchuan.
- Miao Changfeng (繆長風) – a wandering martial artist who falls in love with Yun Ziluo.
- Yang Mu (楊牧) – Yun Ziluo's husband and a prominent martial artist who serves the Qing government.
- Yang Hua (楊華) – Yun Ziluo and Meng Yuanchao's son who is initially raised as Yang Mu's son.
- Yang Yan (楊炎) – Yun Ziluo and Yang Mu's son.
- Lin Wushuang (林無雙) – Meng Yuanchao's ally and eventual wife who becomes the new leader of the Fusang Sect with his help.
- Mou Zongtao (牟宗濤) – Lin Wushuang's cousin who competes with her to be the Fusang Sect's leader.
- Lü Simei (呂思美) – the daughter of Meng Yuanchao's master Lü Shoukun.
- Bu Tiandiao (卜天雕) and Duan Choushi (段仇世) – a pair of eccentric martial artists who take Yang Hua as their apprentice.
- Song Tengxiao (宋騰霄) – Yun Ziluo and Meng Yuanchao's old friend and ally.
- Beigong Wang (北宫望) – an imperial guard commander and Miao Changfeng's enemy.

== Reception and legacy ==
Commentators have described Youjian Jianghu as one of Liang Yusheng's more reflective works and pointed out its emphasis on emotional depth and moral ambiguity as opposed to the large-scale conflicts of his earlier works. Critics observe that the novel departs from Liang Yusheng's earlier adventure-driven style, focusing instead on personal motives, inner conflict, and generational tragedy.

Scholars have suggested that the novel reflects the social undercurrents of the 1960s by using themes of loyalty, rebellion, and sacrifice to explore contemporary anxieties and historical consciousness. Others criticise the novel's romantic subplots and lengthy introspective passages for breaking the narrative momentum and making the overall plot rather uneven.

Within studies of modern wuxia literature, Youjian Jianghu is cited as an example of Liang Yusheng's development of the "cultured swordsman" (文士型侠客) archetype.

== Adaptations ==
In 2006, the novel was adapted into a Hong Kong television series Vagabond Vigilante by TVB, starring Chen Long as Meng Yuanchao, Sonija Kwok as Yun Ziluo, Kenny Ho as Miao Changfeng, and Sunny Chan as Yang Mu.
