= Tanzhi Jinglei =

1977 wuxia novel by Liang Yusheng

- Author: Liang Yusheng
- Original title: 彈指驚雷
- Language: Chinese
- Genre: Wuxia
- Set in: 19th-century China
- Publisher: Chou Mo Pao
- Publication date: 1 May 1977 – 9 March 1981
- Publication place: Hong Kong
- Media type: Print
- ISBN: 9787306043924
- Preceded by: Muye Liuxing
- Followed by: Juesai Chuanfeng Lu

Tanzhi Jinglei
- Traditional Chinese: 彈指驚雷
- Simplified Chinese: 弹指惊雷
- Literal meaning: A Flick of the Finger, Startling Thunder
Transcriptions
Standard Mandarin
- Hanyu Pinyin: Tán Zhǐ Jīng Leí
Yue: Cantonese
- Jyutping: Daan^{6} Zi^{2} Ging^{1} Leoi^{4}

Tanzhi Jinglei (彈指驚雷), literally A Flick of the Finger, Startling Thunder, is a wuxia novel by Liang Yusheng. It was first published as a serial between 1 May 1977 and 9 March 1981 in the Hong Kong newspaper Chou Mo Pao (週末報). The novel is the third instalment in a tetralogy that concludes Liang Yusheng's Tianshan series, continuing from after Youjian Jianghu and Muye Liuxing, and followed by Juesai Chuanfeng Lu.

Set in 19th-century China during the Qing dynasty, the story follows Yang Yan, the son of the protagonists from Youjian Jianghu, as he navigates a world of fractured loyalties, generational feuds, and moral uncertainty. Blending martial arts adventure with psychological introspection, the novel reflects Liang Yusheng's late-career writing style, which is marked by greater emotional depth and attention to the moral consequences of violence. He also refined the image of the "cultured swordsman" and deepened the themes of vengeance, filial duty, and inner conflict.

== Publication history ==
Tanzhi Jinglei was first published as a serial between 1 May 1977 and 9 March 1981 in the Hong Kong newspaper Chou Mo Pao (週末報). Subsequent reprints include a 1987 three-volume edition by North Literature and Art Publishing House, a 1988 three-volume edition by Sichuan Literature and Art Publishing House, a 1989 edition by China Film Press, a 1994 three-volume edition by Cosmos Books, a 1996 two-volume edition by Guangdong Travel and Tourism Press, a 1996 edition by Inner Mongolia Culture Publishing House, and a 2012 two-volume edition by the Sun Yat-Sen University Press.

== Plot summary ==
Set in 19th-century China during the Qing dynasty, the novel follows Yang Yan, the son of Yun Ziluo and Yang Mu. Raised by his godfather Miao Changfeng and initially trained by the Mount Heaven Sect's leader Tang Jingtian, he is lost in the chaos of war. The hermit Long Zeling saves him and teaches him martial arts. After years of training in seclusion, Yang Yan ventures out in search of adventure, setting off a chain of conflicts in the wulin.

Yang Yan meets his maternal cousin Qi Shijie and fellow Mount Heaven Sect swordswoman Leng Bing'er, with whom he forms a complicated romantic bond. Misled into believing that the anti-Qing rebel leader Meng Yuanchao destroyed his parents' relationship, Yang Yan acts rashly and alienates himself from the Mount Heaven Sect. Meanwhile, Qi Shijie falls in love with Leng Bing'er, but his mother Yang Dagu forbids him from having a romantic relationship with Leng Bing'er due to their opposing allegiances to the Qing government and anti-Qing rebels.

During his travels, Yang Yan befriends Long Zeling's estranged granddaughter Long Lingzhu, whose thirst for vengeance mirrors his own. Caught between filial duty, love, and loyalty, Yang Yan gradually recognises the futility of hatred. When he finally confronts Meng Yuanchao, he learns the truth about his family's past and abandons his desire for revenge. The story ends with reconciliation and uncertainty as Yang Yan, Long Lingzhu, and other characters continue to seek peace amidst the shifting loyalties of the wulin.

== Principal characters ==
- Yang Yan (楊炎) – Yun Ziluo and Yang Mu's son who is initially trained by Tang Jingtian and later by Long Zeling.
- Qi Shijie (齊世傑) – Yang Yan's maternal cousin and Jiaxiang's apprentice.
- Leng Bing'er (冷冰兒) – a Mount Heaven Sect swordswoman.
- Long Lingzhu (龍靈珠) – Long Zeling's maternal granddaughter.
- Meng Hua (孟華) – Yun Ziluo and Meng Yuanchao's son, and Yang Yan's half-brother.
- Yang Dagu (楊大姑) – Yang Mu's sister and Qi Shijie's mother.
- Miao Changfeng (繆長風) – Yang Yan's godfather.
- Tang Jingtian (唐經天) – the Mount Heaven Sect's leader whose role links the tetralogy to the earlier novels of the Tianshan series.
- Long Zeling (龍則靈) – a reclusive martial artist from Darjeeling.
- Meng Yuanchao (孟元超) – the leader of the anti-Qing rebels at the Qaidam Basin.
- Yang Mu (楊牧) – Yang Yan's father who serves as a high-ranking imperial guard.
- Jiaxiang (迦象) – a Buddhist monk from Nalanda.
- Duan Jianqing (段劍青) – Duan Choushi's villainous nephew.

== Reception and legacy ==
Tanzhi Jinglei is one of Liang Yusheng's works published in the later or "mature" phase of his writing career, during which he directs his focus more towards emotional conflict and moral ambiguity as opposed to his earlier, more action-driven novels. The Dictionary of Modern Chinese Wuxia Fiction notes that Liang Yusheng further deepens motifs of inherited enmity, divided loyalty, and the cost of vengeance across generations in Tanzhi Jinglei.

Tanzhi Jinglei is also described as combining psychological struggle with broad historical context, but has been criticised for its pacing and subplots which break the narrative momentum.

On Douban, the various editions of Tanzhi Jinglei receive ratings varying roughly between 6.1 and 7.5. Readers praise its emotional depth and thematic ambition, while noting its uneven pacing, continuity issues, or verbosity in descriptive passages.

In academic studies of modern wuxia literature, Tanzhi Jinglei is viewed as a further consolidation of the "cultured swordsman" (文士型侠客) archetype in wuxia novels.
