= Bingpo Hanguang Jian =

1962 wuxia novel by Liang Yusheng

- Author: Liang Yusheng
- Original title: 冰魄寒光劍
- Language: Chinese
- Genre: Wuxia
- Set in: 18th-century China
- Publisher: Cheng Wu Pao
- Publication date: 1962
- Publication place: Hong Kong
- Media type: Print
- ISBN: 9789622578593
- Preceded by: Jianghu San Nüxia
- Followed by: Bingchuan Tiannü Zhuan

Bingpo Hanguang Jian
- Traditional Chinese: 冰魄寒光劍
- Simplified Chinese: 冰魄寒光剑
- Literal meaning: Sword of the Icy Soul
Transcriptions
Standard Mandarin
- Hanyu Pinyin: Bīng Pò Hán Guāng Jiàn
Yue: Cantonese
- Jyutping: Bing^{1} Paak^{3} Hon^{4} Gwong^{1} Gim^{3}

Yougu Hanbing
- Chinese: 幽谷寒冰
- Literal meaning: Frost of the Hidden Valley
Transcriptions
Standard Mandarin
- Hanyu Pinyin: Yōu Gǔ Hán Bīng
Yue: Cantonese
- Jyutping: Jau^{1} Guk^{1} Hon^{4} Bing^{1}

Bingpo Hanguang Jian (冰魄寒光劍), literally Sword of the Icy Soul and also known by its alternative title Yougu Hanbing (幽谷寒冰; "Frost of the Hidden Valley"), is a wuxia novel by Liang Yusheng. It was first published in 1962 as a serial in the Hong Kong newspaper Cheng Wu Pao (正午報).

The story follows Gui Huasheng, a swordsman of the Wudang Sect who becomes involved in political intrigue and cross-border conflicts in Tibet and Nepal. The novel is the fifth instalment in the Tianshan series, preceded by Jianghu San Nüxia and followed by Bingchuan Tiannü Zhuan.

== Publication history ==
Bingpo Hanguang Jian was first published as a serial in 1962 in the Hong Kong newspaper Cheng Wu Pao (正午報). Subsequent reprints include a 1996 edition (combined with Huanjian Qiqing Lu) by Guangdong Travel and Tourism Press, a 1997 edition by Cosmos Books, and another 1997 edition by Storm & Stress Publishing Company.

== Plot summary ==
Gui Huasheng, a Wudang Sect swordsman and the third son of Gui Zhongming and Mao Huanlian, roams the jianghu in search of ways to improve his skills after losing in a duel against swordsmen from the Mount Heaven Sect. During his travels, he cures two martial artists of a deadly poison. Later, he ventures alone to Xinjiang, where he uncovers a conspiracy led by the Nepali king's nephew, Eerdu, to usurp his uncle's throne with aid from factions of the Tibetan Buddhist schools.

Gui Huasheng meets a mysterious maiden, Huayu, who drives away the conspirators and befriends him. They journey together to Mount Nyenchen Tanglha, where they obtain two treasures — the Icy-Soul Sword and the Divine Pellet — and develop a new skill known as the Glacier Swordplay. Although they grow closer, they eventually part ways abruptly.

On his way to Lhasa, Gui Huasheng unexpectedly meets Huayu again and learns that she is serving as a revered guardian under the Dalai Lama. Later, he travels to Nepal, where he befriends the Indian prince Yadexing and the physician Babo. Together, they expose Eerdu's plot to poison the king, with Yadexing using a snow lotus gifted by Gui Huasheng to cure the king. When the king announces a martial arts contest to decide his daughter's marriage, Gui Huasheng learns that Huayu is actually the Nepali king's daughter.

After various intrigues involving the treacherous Eerdu and his allies, Gui Huasheng and Huayu ultimately emerge victorious and impress the Nepali royal court with their Glacier Swordplay. The king consents to their marriage, and the couple retire to Mount Nyenchen Tanglha to live in seclusion.

== Principal characters ==
- Gui Huasheng (桂華生) – Gui Zhongming and Mao Huanlian's third son, and a swordsman of the Wudang Sect. He travels across western China, Tibet and Nepal, where he becomes involved in royal and religious intrigues.
- Huayu (華玉) – a Nepali princess who meets Gui Huasheng during his travels. Well-versed in martial arts and medicine, she later becomes his wife.
- Yadexing (雅德星) – an Indian prince and Master Longye's apprentice. A loyal friend to Gui Huasheng, he plays a crucial role in exposing Eerdu's plot against the Nepali king.
- Master Longye (龍葉上人) – a Buddhist monk from Nalanda who is well-versed in Buddhism and martial arts. His teachings influence Gui Huasheng and Yadexing.
- Babo (巴勃) – a renowned Nepali physician who cures the poisoned king.
- Eerdu (額爾都) – a Nepali prince and Huayu's cousin who conspires to seize the throne from his uncle.

== Reception and legacy ==
Bingpo Hanguang Jian is regarded as a representative example of the "new school" of wuxia fiction that emerged in Hong Kong in the 1950s which combined romantic and historical elements with literary and moral themes.

Some commentators regard Bingpo Hanguang Jian as less distinctive compared to Liang Yusheng's more influential works, describing its plot as relatively conventional compared with his better-known works.

On Douban, Bingpo Hanguang Jian holds an average rating of around 7 out of 10 based on several hundred user reviews. Readers describe the novel as an entertaining instalment in the Tianshan series for its exotic settings and emphasis on romance, while some view the plot as rather plain compared to Liang Yusheng's other works.
