= Fenglei Zhen Jiuzhou =

1963 wuxia novel by Liang Yusheng

- Author: Liang Yusheng
- Original title: 風雷震九州
- Language: Chinese
- Genre: Wuxia
- Set in: 18th-century China
- Publisher: New Evening Post
- Publication date: 22 September 1965 – 28 September 1967
- Publication place: Hong Kong
- Media type: Print
- ISBN: 9789622575363
- Preceded by: Binghe Xijian Lu
- Followed by: Xiagu Danxin

Fenglei Zhen Jiuzhou
- Traditional Chinese: 風雷震九州
- Simplified Chinese: 风雷震九州
- Literal meaning: Wind and Thunder Shock the Nine Provinces
Transcriptions
Standard Mandarin
- Hanyu Pinyin: Fēng Léi Zhèn Jiǔ Zhōu
Yue: Cantonese
- Jyutping: Fung^{1} Leoi^{4} Zan^{3} Gau^{2} Zau^{1}

Fenglei Zhen Jiuzhou (風雷震九州), literally Wind and Thunder Shock the Nine Provinces, is a wuxia novel by Liang Yusheng. It was first published as a serial in the Hong Kong newspaper New Evening Post from 22 September 1965 to 28 September 1967. The novel is the ninth instalment in the Tianshan series, preceded by Binghe Xijian Lu and followed by Xiagu Danxin.

Set in 18th-century China during the Qing dynasty, the story continues the saga of Jiang Haitian and his apprentices as they become entangled in rivalries, political conspiracies, and personal betrayals within the wulin.

Fenglei Zhen Jiuzhou has received mixed critical and reader responses. It is noted for its ambitious scope and focus on morally conflicted characters, though some commentators consider its pacing and structure less consistent than Liang Yusheng's most acclaimed works.

== Publication history ==
Fenglei Zhen Jiuzhou was first published as a serial in the Hong Kong newspaper New Evening Post from 22 September 1965 to 28 September 1967. Subsequent reprints include a 1981 edition by Qingdao People's Publishing House, a 1988 edition by Kunlun Publishing House, a 1993 three-volume edition by Cosmos Books, and a 1996 three-volume edition by Guangdong Travel and Tourism Press.

== Plot summary ==
The story is set in 18th-century China during the Qing dynasty, continuing after the events of the previous novel. The couple Jiang Haitian and Gu Zhonglian have become the leaders of the anti-Qing forces in the wulin. One day, they meet their nephew Ye Lingfeng, who seeks their help in rescuing a kidnapped Li Guangxia. Jiang Haitian takes Ye Lingfeng as his apprentice, and agrees to assist. Meanwhile, the Jiangs' daughter Jiang Xiaofu gets injured after clashing with Qi Shengyin and Yuchi Jiong. She is saved by Yuwen Xiong, who later also becomes her father's apprentice. Jiang Haitian resolves the dispute with Qi Shengyin and Yuchi Jiong, and enlists their help in saving Li Guangxia, whom he then takes as an apprentice.

Jiang Haitian goes to warn the anti-Qing Heavenly Order Cult of an impending attack by Qing government forces, but falls into a trap and nearly dies. After recovering, he takes the cult's deputy leader's son Lin Daoxuan as his apprentice. Soon after, Jiang Haitian is invited by the Beggar Clan to mediate a dispute, drawing him into a conflict involving three reclusive martial artists which he eventually resolves.

Meanwhile, Ye Lingfeng reveals himself to be an impostor: his real identity is Ye Tingzong, the son of the Viceroy of Sichuan Ye Shaoqi. He has been impersonating Ye Lingfeng, who is believed to be dead, in order to infiltrate the Jiang family and aid the Qing government in destroying the anti-Qing forces in the wulin. To conceal his identity, he frames Yuwen Xiong for injuring Qi Shengyin, resulting in Yuwen Xiong being expelled from the Jiang family.

Around this time, Ye Shaoqi is leading Qing forces to suppress a rebellion at Xiaojinchuan. The anti-Qing forces in the wulin mobilise to support the rebels, and Ye Tingzong is selected to lead them. Concurrently, Jiang Haitian travels to Beijing to rescue his captured allies and learns of Ye Tingzong's true identity. Overwhelmed by fury, he falls sick but reinstates Yuwen Xiong, makes him heir to the Jiang family, and sends him to Xiaojinchuan to expose Ye Tingzong's deceit.

On his journey, Yuwen Xiong meets the real Ye Lingfeng, who has survived and now calls himself Ye Muhua to disassociate himself from the impostor. Together, they uncover Ye Tingzong's treachery and save the rebels from annihilation. Supported by their wulin allies, the rebels defeat Qing forces at Xiaojinchuan; both Ye Shaoqi and Ye Tingzong perish in battle. Peace is restored to the wulin. Jiang Haitian's four apprentices — Yuwen Xiong, Lin Daoxuan, Li Guangxia and Ye Muhua — are reunited with their master in triumph.

== Principal characters ==
- Jiang Haitian (江海天) – the foremost martial artist in the wulin who mentors the next generation of heroes.
- Gu Zhonglian (谷中蓮) – Jiang Haitian's wife and the Mount Mang Sect's leader who supports her husband's cause.
- Jiang Xiaofu (江曉芙) – Jiang Haitian and Gu Zhonglian's daughter who marries Yuwen Xiong.
- Yuwen Xiong (宇文雄) – Jiang Haitian's apprentice who upholds his master's ideals.
- Ye Muhua (葉慕華) / Ye Lingfeng (葉凌風) – Ye Chongxiao and Ouyang Wan's son. After surviving his impostor's deception, he becomes Jiang Haitian's apprentice and aids his uncle in defeating Qing forces.
- Li Guangxia (李光夏) – Jiang Haitian's apprentice and member of the anti-Qing Heavenly Order Cult.
- Lin Daoxuan (林道軒) – Jiang Haitian's apprentice, known for his calm and scholarly demeanour.
- Ye Tingzong (葉廷宗) – the main antagonist who impersonates Ye Lingfeng.
- Ye Shaoqi (葉少奇) – Ye Tingzong's father and the Viceroy of Sichuan.
- Qi Shengyin (祈聖因) and Yuchi Jiong (尉遲炯) – a couple who serve as the Jiang family's allies.
- Zhu Shangfu (竺尚父), Yang Zheng (楊鉦) and Shangguan Tai (上官泰) – three reclusive martial artists related to each other by marriage. Yang Zheng defects to the Qing government and tries to sow discord between his brothers-in-law and others, drawing them into the broader conflict in the wulin.

== Reception and legacy ==
Fenglei Zhen Jiuzhou has attracted mixed responses from critics. Scholarly surveys of Liang Yusheng's works place the novel among his mid-1960s works and note its publication in the New Evening Post from 22 September 1965 to 28 September 1967.

Reader ratings on Douban show moderate popularity (around 6.6/10), with many readers praising Liang Yusheng's prose and the novel's ambitious scope while criticising uneven pacing, repetitive plot elements, and weaker characterisation compared to his better-known works.

Commentators have observed that Fenglei Zhen Jiuzhou differs from Liang Yusheng's more conventional hero-centred narratives by directing more attention to morally ambiguous or antagonistic figures, notably Ye Tingzong. Reviewers regard this as an innovative attempt to broaden the character palette, while also arguing that the plot suffers from episodic repetition and occasional borrowing of motifs from earlier instalments.

Popular commentary highlight the novel's unusual focus on villainous psychology and internal motivation as a distinguishing feature, even as such commentary also point out structural or pacing weaknesses compared with Liang Yusheng's more highly-regarded novels.
