= The Patriotic Knights =

2010 Chinese TV series

- DVD cover art
- 侠骨丹心
- Genre: Wuxia
- Based on: Xiagu Danxin by Liang Yusheng
- Screenplay by: Li Xiaowei; Fan Zhizhong; Chen Jinhai; Zhang Xian; Li Changfu
- Directed by: Kuk Kwok-leung
- Presented by: Xu Yong'an; Zhou Li; Chen Jinhai
- Starring: Chen Long; Stephanie Hsiao; Wallace Chung; He Meitian
- Opening theme: "Jianghu" (江湖) by Zhang Kefan
- Ending theme: "Love Doesn't Believe in Tears" (爱不相信眼泪) by Zhang Kefan and Wenwen
- Composer: Ju Wenpei
- Country of origin: China
- Original language: Mandarin
- No. of episodes: 45

Production
- Executive producer: Wang Yong
- Producer: Chen Jinhai
- Production locations: Hengdian World Studios; Yinchuan
- Cinematography: Ma Youtai; Shao Jinghui
- Editor: Wang Weiting
- Running time: ≈ 45 minutes per episode
- Production companies: Zhejiang HG Entertainment; Jiangsu Broadcast & Television Group

Original release
- Network: Guizhou TV
- Release: 10 March 2010 – 2010

The Patriotic Knights (侠骨丹心) is a Chinese wuxia television series adapted from the novel Xiagu Danxin by Liang Yusheng. Directed by Kuk Kwok-leung, it starred Chen Long, Stephanie Hsiao, Wallace Chung, and He Meitian. It was first shown in China in 2010 on Guizhou TV even though it already completed shooting in 2006. The Tai Seng DVD set was released in 2007.

== Synopsis ==
The series is set in 17th-century China during the Ming dynasty. The corrupt eunuch Wei Zhongxian holds sway over the Ming government and plots to usurp the throne with the aid of his supporters in the wulin. He instigates Meng Shentong to kidnap Li Shengnan and force her to hand over a highly coveted martial arts manual. The great hero Jin Shiyi rescues Li Shengnan and combines forces with her to defeat Meng Shentong. When Li Shengnan dies of her injuries, Jin Shiyi feels so deeply saddened that he leaves the wulin to lead a reclusive life on a remote island.

Years later, Jiang Haitian, Jin Shiyi's apprentice, has become a leading figure in the wulin and started a rebellion against the corrupt Ming government. Shi Baidu, the chief of the Six Harmonies Clan, secretly pledges allegiance to Wei Zhongxian and promises to deal with the rebels.

When Jiang Haitian invites guests from throughout the wulin to attend his daughter's wedding, Shi Baidu seizes the opportunity to make an attempt on Jiang Haitian's life. Shi Hongying, Shi Baidu's sister, tries to dissuade her brother from helping Wei Zhongxian, but he ignores her so she sneaks out to warn Jiang Haitian.

Around this time, Jin Zhuliu, Jin Shiyi's son, sets foot on the mainland in search of adventure. By chance, he meets Shi Hongying and falls in love with her. He also encounters Li Shengnan's nephew, Li Nanxing, and becomes sworn brothers with him. They work together with their wulin allies to resist Wei Zhongxian.

== Cast ==
- Chen Long as Jin Zhuliu
- Stephanie Hsiao as Shi Hongying
- Wallace Chung as Li Nanxing
- He Meitian as Zhong Yanyan
- Jing Gangshan as Jin Shiyi
- He Jiayi as Gu Zhihua
- Niu Mengmeng as Li Shengnan
- Eddy Ko as Jiang Haitian
- Shen Junyi as Shi Baidu
- Jewel Lee as He Daniang
- Norman Chui as Meng Shentong
- Siqin Gaoli as Feng Miaochang
- Akina Hong as Dong Shisanniang
- Ji Chunhua as Shuai Mengxiong
- Wang Deshun as Zhong Changtong
- Li Donghan as Qin Yuanhao
- Wang Jianxin as Yang Hao
- Liu Weihua as Ouyang Jian
- Li Guohua as Wei Zhongxian
- Chen Zhihui as Yuanhai
- Bai Zhicheng as Taoist Shushi
- Tan Jianchang as Li Dun
- Wang Li as Jiao Lei
- Li Kelong as Qingfu
- Wang Shuo as Ye Muhua
- Han Zhenhua as Feng Zichao
- Ma Ji as Wen Daozhuang
- Cheng Wu as Wen Shengzhong
- Li Hong as Gu Zhonglian
- Xu Yena as Jiang Xiaofu
- Yuan Wenqing as Yuwen Xiong
- Wang Qun as Yuchi Jiong
- He Sirong as Qi Shengyin
- Xie Jiaqi as Sha Qianfeng
- Tan Xinrou as Mudan
- Zhang Ying as Shaoyao
- Xu Xiangdong as Chen Tianyu
- Feng Jing as Chen Guangzhao
