= Huang Ji =

Chinese imperial painter

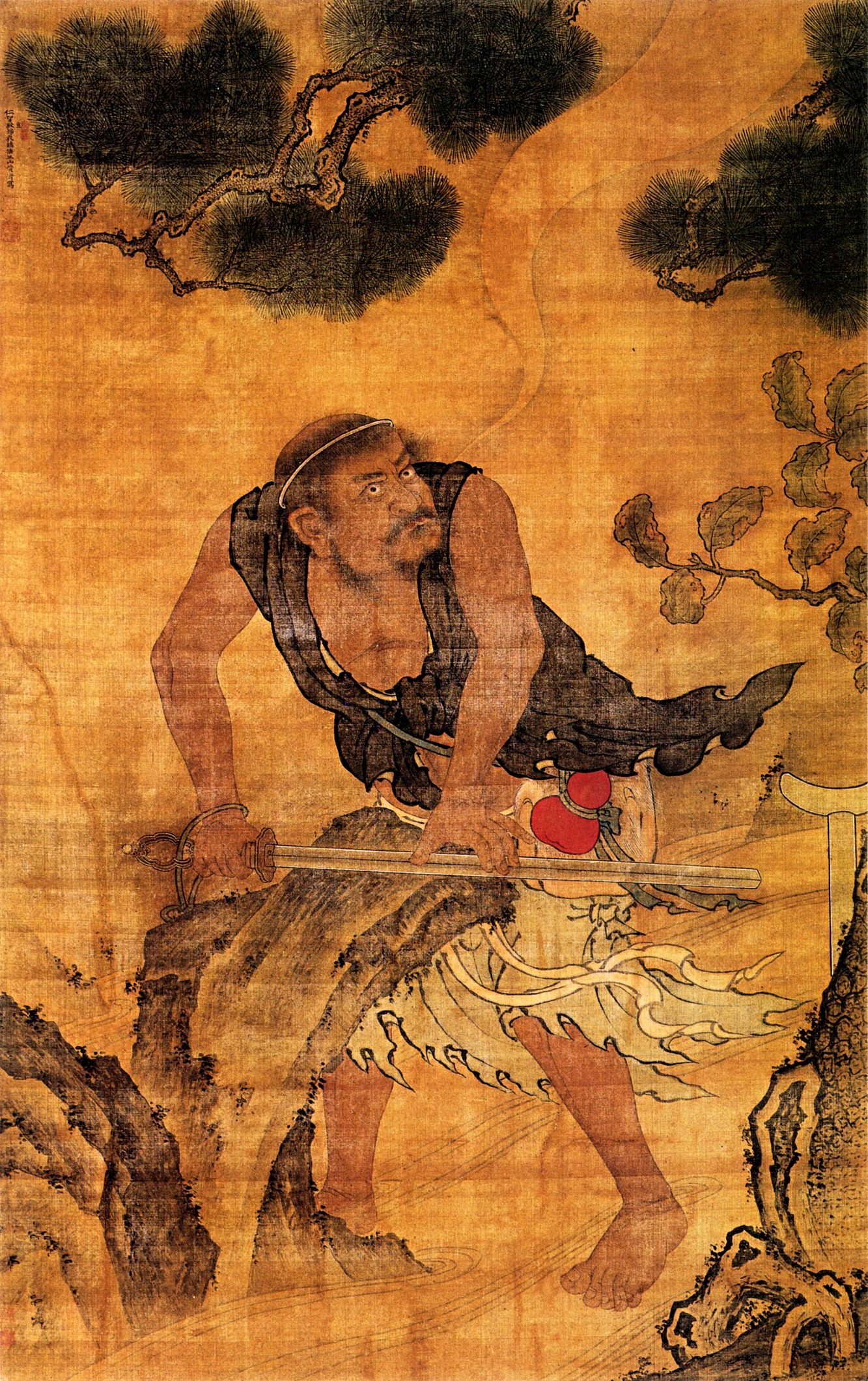
Huang Ji, Sharpening a Sword, Palace Museum

Huang Ji (simplified Chinese: 黄济; traditional Chinese: 黃濟; pinyin: Huáng Jì; Wade–Giles: Huang Chi), was a Chinese imperial painter during the Ming dynasty. His birth and death years are unknown.

Huang Ji was born in Minhou in Fujian Province. He was known for painting people
