= Bingchuan Tiannü Zhuan =

1959 wuxia novel by Liang Yusheng

- Author: Liang Yusheng
- Original title: 冰川天女傳
- Language: Chinese
- Genre: Wuxia
- Set in: 18th-century China
- Publisher: New Evening Post
- Publication date: 5 August 1959 – 18 December 1960
- Publication place: Hong Kong
- Media type: Print
- ISBN: 9787306042637
- Preceded by: Bingpo Hanguang Jian
- Followed by: Yunhai Yugong Yuan

Bingchuan Tiannü Zhuan
- Traditional Chinese: 冰川天女傳
- Simplified Chinese: 冰川天女传
- Literal meaning: Story of the Heavenly Maiden of the Glacier
Transcriptions
Standard Mandarin
- Hanyu Pinyin: Bīng Chuān Tiān Nǚ Zhuàn
Yue: Cantonese
- Jyutping: Bing^{1} Cyun^{1} Tin^{1} Neoi^{5} Cyun^{4}

Bingchuan Tiannü Zhuan (冰川天女傳), literally Story of the Heavenly Maiden of the Glacier, is a wuxia novel by Liang Yusheng. It was first published as a serial in the Hong Kong newspaper New Evening Post from 5 August 1959 to 18 December 1960. The novel is the sixth instalment in the Tianshan series, following Bingpo Hanguang Jian and preceding Yunhai Yugong Yuan. Within the Tianshan series, it is considered the first part of a trilogy, followed by Yunhai Yugong Yuan and Binghe Xijian Lu. Set in 18th-century China, the story centres on Gui Bing'e, the titular "Heavenly Maiden of the Glacier" who gets entangled in conflicts spanning Tibet, Nepal, and the Chinese wulin.

== Publication history ==
Bingchuan Tiannü Zhuan was first published as a serial in the Hong Kong newspaper New Evening Post from 5 August 1959 to 18 December 1960. Subsequent reprints include a 1992 two-volume edition by Sichuan Literature and Art Publishing House, 1986, 1993 and 2012 three-volume editions by Cosmos Books, a 1995 edition by Storm & Stress Publishing Company, a 1996 two-volume edition by Guangdong Travel and Tourism Press, and 2012, 2014 and 2021 three-volume editions by the Sun Yat-Sen University Press.

== Plot summary ==
Set in 18th-century China during the Qing dynasty, the story follows Gui Bing'e, the daughter of Gui Huasheng and Huayu. Living in seclusion beside a Tibetan lake, she intervenes in a conflict over the sacred Golden Urn when Qing government forces escorting the Golden Urn to Lhasa are attacked by wulin factions seeking to steal it. With her overwhelming martial prowess, she ends the fighting and ensures that the Golden Urn safely reaches its destination.

Afterwards, Gui Bing'e befriends Tang Jingtian, the son of the Mount Heaven Sect's leaders Tang Xiaolan and Feng Ying. The two travel together and gradually fall in love, but a longstanding feud between their families and a misunderstanding at Mount Heaven drive them apart.

Gui Bing'e later journeys to Mount Emei to visit her uncle Mao Chuansheng, a Wudang Sect elder who is hosting a grand wulin gathering. Along the way, she meets the antisocial drifter Jin Shiyi and treats him kindly despite his poor reputation in the wulin. As a result, he becomes deeply attached to her.

During the gathering, Gui Bing'e, Tang Jingtian and Jin Shiyi repel intruders with help from Lü Siniang. Jin Shiyi, who is poisoned during the battle and ends up in a state of zouhuorumo, disappears after refusing aid from the Mount Heaven Sect.

When intrigue in Tibet and Nepal threatens war, Gui Bing'e and Tang Jingtian travel south to expose a conspiracy and prevent the outbreak of war. At the same time, Jin Shiyi regains his sanity and then leaves to live in solitude. The novel ends with the heroes parting ways beneath the Himalayas and continuing their journeys across the open plains.

== Principal characters ==
- Gui Bing'e (桂冰娥), nicknamed "Heavenly Maiden of the Glacier" (冰川天女) – Gui Huasheng and Huayu's daughter and a martial arts prodigy.
- Tang Jingtian (唐經天) – Tang Xiaolan and Feng Ying's son who travels with Gui Bing'e and eventually marries her.
- Jin Shiyi (金世遺), nicknamed "Venom-Handed Mad Beggar" (毒手瘋丐) – an antisocial drifter raised and trained by an eccentric master living on a remote island. He forms a deep attachment to Gui Bing'e after she shows him kindness, maturing through his experiences.
- Chen Tianyu (陳天宇) – Lü Qing's apprentice and an ally of the heroes.
- Jiang Nan (江南) – Chen Tianyu's page who marries Yang Liuqing and Zou Xijiu's daughter Zou Jiangxia (鄒絳霞). Their son, Jiang Haitian, is a key character in the middle segment of the Tianshan series.
- Youping (幽萍) – Gui Bing'e's loyal handmaiden who marries Chen Tianyu.
- Zhina (芝娜) – a Qinbu princess who helps the heroes resolve the political intrigues in Tibet and Nepal.
- Li Qinmei (李沁梅) – Feng Lin and Li Zhi's daughter who loves Jin Shiyi and tries to help him recover from his zouhuorumo condition.
- Lü Qing (呂青) – Gan Fengchi's apprentice who trains Chen Tianyu and serves as an ally to the heroes.
- Mao Chuansheng (冒川生) – Gui Zhongming and Mao Huanlian's eldest son and a Wudang Sect elder who hosts the wulin gathering at Mount Emei.
- Lü Siniang (呂四娘) – the leader of the Mount Mang Sect who supports Gui Bing'e and her allies in the conflicts.
- Tang Xiaolan (唐晓澜) and Feng Ying (馮瑛) – Tang Jingtian's parents and the Mount Heaven Sect's leaders who serve as mentor figures to the next generation of heroes.

== Reception and legacy ==
Bingchuan Tiannü Zhuan has been listed as one of Liang Yusheng's major works and discussed in academic studies of his evolving style and serialisation in the late 1950s.

Comparative literary studies refer to the novel when they examine how Liang Yusheng blends wuxia narratives with romantic and environmental motifs. In one later edition, the novel is described as a "romantic legend" for integrating historical and religious elements.

The novel has received positive reader evaluations on Douban and remains in print through multiple reissues.
