= Mount Heaven Sect =

Fictional martial arts sect

- Chinese: 天山派
Transcriptions
Standard Mandarin
- Hanyu Pinyin: Tiān Shān Pài
Yue: Cantonese
- Jyutping: Tin^{1} Saan^{1} Paai^{3}

The Mount Heaven Sect (天山派), also translated as the Tianshan Sect or Mount Heaven School, is a fictional martial arts sect or school that appears in wuxia fiction. The sect is named after the Tian Shan (literally "Mount Heaven") mountain range in Central Asia, which serves as its base.

The Mount Heaven Sect features most prominently in Liang Yusheng's interconnected cycle of novels known as the Tianshan series, where it represents a righteous and orthodox martial arts lineage whose members embody Liang Yusheng's recurring ideal of the "cultured swordsman" (文士型俠客), combining literary refinement with martial virtue. Within Liang Yusheng's fictional chronology, the sect traces its origins to the swordsman Huo Tiandu during the Ming dynasty, and its later generations appear throughout subsequent works set during the Qing dynasty. The Mount Heaven Sect plays a unifying role across Liang Yusheng's wuxia universe, linking multiple storylines through shared characters and teachings.

An unrelated organisation with the same name also appears in Jin Yong’s Demi-Gods and Semi-Devils, where it is based on Mount Heaven and led by Tianshan Tonglao.

== In Liang Yusheng's works ==
In the Tianshan series, the Mount Heaven Sect's origins can be traced to the 15th century during the Ming dynasty, starting with the swordsman Huo Tiandu, who appears as a key supporting character in the second half of the Pingzong series. Huo Tiandu was trained by his father Huo Xingzhong, a highly-skilled swordsman who had retired to live at Mount Heaven to avoid the chaos of war. Huo Tiandu has an ongoing rivalry with his wife Ling Yunfeng, who is also an accomplished swordswoman.

Huo Tiandu and Ling Yunfeng separately take Yue Mingke (later known as Master Huiming) and Lian Nichang – two of the main characters of Baifa Monü Zhuan – as their apprentices. Huiming and Lian Nichang, in turn, take apprentices of their own, resulting in the creation of two branches of the Mount Heaven Sect. The two branches are united in Qijian Xia Tianshan when Huiming and Lian Nichang's apprentices, as well as others, form a group known as the "Seven Swords of Mount Heaven": Ling Weifeng, Yilan Zhu, Zhang Huazhao, Mao Huanlian, Gui Zhongming, Wu Qiongyao, and Hamaya.

The "Seven Swords of Mount Heaven", along with their apprentices and descendants, play both leading and supporting roles in the subsequent Tianshan novels, which are set in the 17th, 18th and 19th centuries during the Qing dynasty. Tang Xiaolan and Feng Ying, who become the Mount Heaven Sect's leaders in the middle segment of the Tianshan series, are trained by Yilan Zhu. Wu Qiongyao's son, Li Zhi, marries Feng Ying's twin sister, Feng Lin. Tang Xiaolan and Feng Ying's son, Tang Jingtian, succeeds his parents as the sect's leader towards the end of the Tianshan series. Gui Zhongming and Mao Huanlian's son, Gui Huasheng, and Gui Huasheng's daughter, Gui Bing'e, are the lead characters in two of the Tianshan novels. Tang Jingtian eventually marries Gui Bing'e, and their son, Tang Jiayuan, serves as the sect's acting leader after his father's death before eventually passing the position to Yang Yan.

The Mount Heaven Sect also traces its martial arts lineage to the 15th-century swordsman Zhang Danfeng, a central character in the Pingzong series. Zhang Danfeng has briefly guided Huo Tiandu in swordsmanship and taken him as a nominal apprentice, and Huo Tiandu ultimately inherits Zhang Danfeng's legacy at the end of the Pingzong series.

The Mount Heaven Sect continues to appear throughout the rest of the Tianshan series. Across these works, successive generations of Mount Heaven Sect members uphold a legacy of righteousness and self-discipline while confronting corruption and tyranny. The sect's leaders often embody Liang Yusheng's ideal of the "cultured swordsman" (文士型侠客), combining literary refinement with martial prowess.

== In Jin Yong's works ==
In Jin Yong's Demi-Gods and Semi-Devils, the Mount Heaven Sect is founded by Tianshan Tonglao and based in Lingjiu Palace (靈鷲宮) on Ethereal Peak (縹緲峰) of Mount Heaven. The sect is initially introduced as a mysterious and reclusive organisation whose influence extends through the Lords of the 36 Caves and 72 Islands, who are enslaved by the Life and Death Talisman (生死符) and bound to obey Tianshan Tonglao. After succeeding her as master of Lingjiu Palace, Xuzhu releases them from servitude, and they willingly swear allegiance to him out of gratitude.

== See also ==
- Tien Shan Pai
