= Binghe Xijian Lu =

1963 wuxia novel by Liang Yusheng

- Author: Liang Yusheng
- Original title: 冰河洗劍錄
- Language: Chinese
- Genre: Wuxia
- Set in: 18th-century China
- Publisher: New Evening Post
- Publication date: 24 August 1963 – 22 August 1965
- Publication place: Hong Kong
- Media type: Print
- ISBN: 9786263755604
- Preceded by: Yunhai Yugong Yuan
- Followed by: Fenglei Zhen Jiuzhou

Binghe Xijian Lu
- Traditional Chinese: 冰河洗劍錄
- Simplified Chinese: 冰河洗剑录
- Literal meaning: Chronicle of Washing the Sword in the Icy River
Transcriptions
Standard Mandarin
- Hanyu Pinyin: Bīng Hé Xǐ Jiàn Lù
Yue: Cantonese
- Jyutping: Bing^{1} Ho^{4} Sai^{2} Gim^{3} Luk^{6}

Binghe Xijian Lu (冰河洗劍錄), literally Chronicle of Washing the Sword in the Icy River, is a wuxia novel by Liang Yusheng. It was first published as a serial in the Hong Kong newspaper New Evening Post from 24 August 1963 to 22 August 1965. The novel is the eighth instalment in the Tianshan series and forms the concluding part of a trilogy that follows Bingchuan Tiannü Zhuan and Yunhai Yugong Yuan.

Binghe Xijian Lu is regarded as a lesser-known but significant entry among Liang Yusheng's wuxia novels, notable for extending the universe of the Tianshan series and reflecting his mid-1960s creative phase.

== Publication history ==
Binghe Xijian Lu was first published as a serial in the Hong Kong newspaper New Evening Post from 24 August 1963 to 22 August 1965. Subsequent reprints include a 1985 edition by Lhasa People's Publishing House, a 1988 edition by Huaxia Publishing House, a 1996 two-volume edition by Guangdong Travel and Tourism Press, a 2000 four-volume edition by Cosmos Books, and a 2012 three-volume edition by the Sun Yat-Sen University Press.

== Plot summary ==
Set in 18th-century China during the Qing dynasty, the story follows Jiang Haitian, the son of minor characters from the earlier novels. In his childhood, Jiang Haitian was kidnapped by the Heavenly Demonic Cult before being saved by Jin Shiyi, who then trained him in martial arts.

While exploring the wulin, Jiang Haitian meets Jin Shiyi's old flame Gu Zhihua and her adoptive daughter Gu Zhonglian, whom he falls in love with. During his adventures, he faces hostility from Li Fusheng, the Heavenly Demonic Cult's deputy leader who holds a grudge against Jin Shiyi for letting down his aunt Li Shengnan.

Later, Jiang Haitian participates in a wulin gathering in the Masar Kingdom and navigates a series of challenges, including impersonations, kidnappings, and hostile factions. With assistance from his allies, he saves Gu Zhonglian from danger and discovers that she is actually a Masar princess. He helps her reunite with her long-lost family members and avenge her murdered father.

During these events, Jiang Haitian helps the Masar Kingdom avert war, resolves conflicts caused by the Heavenly Demonic Cult, and assists other martial artists in reconciling past grudges. Li Fusheng also forgives Jin Shiyi after getting to understand him better, and convinces his lover Kalanni, the Heavenly Demonic Cult's leader, to disband the cult.

In the finale, the heroes return to Mount Mang to support the anti-Qing forces in the wulin in fending off an attack by Qing government forces. They emerge triumphant against overwhelming odds. After two decades of trials, Jin Shiyi and Gu Zhihua finally marry and retire to a remote island, while Jiang Haitian and Gu Zhonglian become the new leading figures in the wulin to continue their predecessors' legacy.

== Principal characters ==
- Jiang Haitian (江海天) – Jiang Nan and Zou Jiangxia's son and Jin Shiyi's apprentice who carries on his master's heroic legacy and becomes the leader of the anti-Qing forces in the wulin.
- Gu Zhonglian (谷中蓮) – Gu Zhihua's adoptive daughter who is actually a Masar princess. She supports Jiang Haitian through many ordeals and eventually marries him.
- Jin Shiyi (金世遺) – one of the most powerful fighters in the wulin who trained Jiang Haitian and later helps to resolve longstanding rivalries.
- Gu Zhihua (谷之華) – Lü Siniang's apprentice and the leader of the Mount Mang Sect. Once in love with Jin Shiyi, she remains an influential mentor to the next generation.
- Tangnu Zhumu (唐努珠穆) – a Masar prince and Gu Zhonglian's brother who becomes Jin Shiyi's second apprentice. He assists Jiang Haitian in the power struggles and eventually becomes the king of Masar.
- Hua Yunbi (華雲碧) – the daughter of the renowned physician Hua Tianfeng. She is well-versed in both medicine and martial arts, and eventually marries Yun Qiong.
- Li Fusheng (厲復生) – Li Shengnan's nephew and the deputy leader of the Heavenly Demonic Cult. Initially hostile towards Jin Shiyi, he later reforms and helps to disband the cult.
- Kalanni (卡蘭妮) – Li Fusheng's lover and the leader of the Heavenly Demonic Cult. She ultimately agrees to dissolve the cult for the sake of peace in the wulin.
- Ye Chongxiao (葉衝霄) – a Masar prince and Gu Zhonglian's brother. He becomes close friends with Jiang Haitian and decides to remain in the wulin instead of serving as the king of Masar.
- Ouyang Wan (歐陽婉) – an intelligent and loyal martial artist who marries Ye Chongxiao.
- Yun Qiong (雲瓊) – a descendant of Yun Zhong and a valiant young hero who befriends Jiang Haitian.
- Yun Bi (雲璧) – Yun Qiong's sister who marries Tangnu Zhumu.

== Reception and legacy ==
Binghe Xijian Lu has garnered a mixed but enduring place among Liang Yusheng's wuxia novels. While it has its admirers among fans of the Tianshan series, it also draws criticism for its narrative and structural weaknesses.

According to an online essay, "for Liang Yusheng's old fans, the author's wuxia novels remain unforgettable classics... yet many newer readers feel the story in Binghe Xijian Lu is somewhat flat, the characters less vivid, and the didactic tone pronounced."

On Douban, reader commentaries are generally negative for Binghe Xijian Lu. One review titled "Binghe Xijian Lu is the worst in the trilogy" argues that the novel's internal logic is weak — such as inconsistencies in martial arts descriptions — and that the novel fails to maintain the strengths of Yunhai Yugong Yuan.

At the same time, the novel is integral to the Tianshan series, functioning as the eighth instalment and linking earlier protagonists such as Jin Shiyi to a new generation of heroes represented by Jiang Haitian. In this way, the novel expands the universe of the Tianshan series and contributes to its continuity.

More broadly speaking, Liang Yusheng is regarded as a trailblazer of the "new school" of wuxia fiction that emerged in Hong Kong in the 1950s. Although Binghe Xijian Lu is hardly mentioned in academic studies, its place within Liang Yusheng's mid-1960s works makes it relevant to discussions of this transitional phase in his writing style.
