= Jianghu San Nüxia =

1957 wuxia novel by Liang Yusheng

- Author: Liang Yusheng
- Original title: 江湖三女俠
- Language: Chinese
- Genre: Wuxia
- Set in: 18th-century China
- Publisher: Ta Kung Pao
- Publication date: 8 April 1957 – 10 December 1958
- Publication place: Hong Kong
- Media type: Print
- ISBN: 9789860723434
- Preceded by: Qijian Xia Tianshan
- Followed by: Bingpo Hanguang Jian

Jianghu San Nüxia
- Traditional Chinese: 江湖三女俠
- Simplified Chinese: 江湖三女侠
- Literal meaning: Three Heroines of the Jianghu
Transcriptions
Standard Mandarin
- Hanyu Pinyin: Jiāng Hú Sān Nǚ Xiá
Yue: Cantonese
- Jyutping: Gong^{1} Wu^{4} Saam^{1} Neoi^{5} Hap^{6}

Jianghu San Nüxia (江湖三女俠), literally Three Heroines of the Jianghu, is a wuxia novel by Liang Yusheng. It was first published as a serial in the Hong Kong newspaper Ta Kung Pao from 8 April 1957 to 10 December 1958. Set in 18th-century China, the novel follows the intertwined destinies of three swordswomen — Lü Siniang, Feng Ying and Feng Lin — as they navigate loyalty, revenge, and love amidst political intrigue and imperial oppression. The character Lü Siniang is partly based on earlier materials, such as the novel Jianxia Lü Siniang by Sun Jianqiu, which predate Jianghu San Nüxia.

Jianghu San Nüxia is the fourth instalment in the Tianshan series, preceded by Qijian Xia Tianshan and followed by Bingpo Hanguang Jian. It is noted for its strong female protagonists, historical setting, and its blending of romantic and heroic themes that helped shape the evolution of modern wuxia fiction.

== Publication history ==
Jianghu San Nüxia was first published as a serial in the Hong Kong newspaper Ta Kung Pao from 8 April 1957 to 10 December 1958. Subsequent reprints include a 1985 edition by Inner Mongolia People's Publishing House, a 1988 edition by Sino-Culture Press, 1988 and 1996 two-volume editions by Guangdong Travel and Tourism Press, a 2000 three-volume edition by Cosmos Books, a 2002 three-volume edition by Storm & Stress Publishing Company, and a 2012 two-volume edition by the Sun Yat-Sen University Press.

== Plot summary ==
The story is set in 18th-century China during the Qing dynasty when the imperial government is persecuting anti-Qing martial artists in the wulin. Feng Guangchao, a retired martial artist, is celebrating the birthday of his twin granddaughters, Feng Ying and Feng Lin, when he is attacked by Qing government agents. The sisters are separated in the chaos: Feng Ying escapes with Tang Xiaolan, her grandfather's apprentice, while Feng Lin is captured by the henchmen of Yinzhen, the power-hungry fourth son of the Kangxi Emperor.

Tang Xiaolan and Feng Ying are saved by Lü Siniang, an apprentice of the legendary "One-Armed Divine Nun". Together, they join the Mount Heaven Sect, where the "Seven Swords" train them in swordsmanship. Over time, Tang Xiaolan learns that he is an illegitimate son of the Kangxi Emperor – a revelation that initially results in misunderstandings between him and the wulin.

Meanwhile, Feng Lin survives in Yinzhen's household, her identity concealed and manipulated for political ends. After escaping captivity, she is trained by Li Zhi, Li Siyong and Wu Qiongyao's son, and becomes a skilled swordswoman in her own right. The Feng sisters' paths ultimately cross and diverge through a web of mistaken identities, unspoken love, and shifting allegiances.

When Yinzhen is enthroned as the Yongzheng Emperor after his father's death, his purge of former allies and suppression of the wulin bring the heroes' struggles to a head. Tang Xiaolan, poisoned and betrayed, survives through the help of his companions, while the Feng sisters and Lü Siniang resolve to strike back.

In the finale, Lü Siniang and the Feng sisters disguise themselves and infiltrate the imperial palace to assassinate the Yongzheng Emperor, avenging their fallen wulin allies and fulfilling their moral duty. The novel ends with reconciliation and three marriages: Feng Ying with Tang Xiaolan, Lü Siniang with Shen Zaikuan, and Feng Lin with Li Zhi.

== Principal characters ==
- Lü Siniang (呂四娘) – Lü Liuliang's granddaughter who was trained by the "One-Armed Divine Nun".
- Feng Ying (馮瑛) – Feng Guangchao's granddaughter and Yilan Zhu's apprentice.
- Feng Lin (馮琳) – Feng Ying's twin sister who learns swordsmanship from Fu Qingzhu's manuals and Li Zhi.
- Tang Xiaolan (唐曉瀾) – an illegitimate son of the Kangxi Emperor, raised as a commoner and trained by Feng Guangchao, Yilan Zhu and Yang Zhongying.
- Li Zhi (李治) – Wu Qiongyao and Li Siyong's son and a Mount Heaven Sect swordsman who marries Feng Lin.
- Shen Zaikuan (沈在寬) – Lü Siniang's lover and a former student of her father Lü Baozhong.
- Yang Zhongying (楊仲英) – an influential wulin leader and ally of the heroes.
- Yang Liuqing (楊柳青) – Yang Zhongying's daughter who marries Zou Xijiu (鄒錫九). Her grandson Jiang Haitian is a key character in the middle segment of the Tianshan series.
- Gan Fengchi (甘鳳池) – Lü Siniang's senior who accompanies her on her adventures.
- Yinzhen (胤禛) – a power-hungry and ruthless Qing prince who later becomes the Yongzheng Emperor.
- Nian Gengyao (年羹堯) – a martial artist who serves as Yinzhen's ally and later becomes a Qing general.

== Reception and legacy ==
Jianghu San Nüxia is cited as one of Liang Yusheng's more significant works and part of the novels that gave rise to the "new school" of wuxia fiction that emerged in Hong Kong in the 1950s. According to literary commentary, Liang Yusheng was influential in shifting wuxia novels from simple vengeance tales to stories combining poetic justice, historical elements, and emotional depth. His stylistic traits — an emphasis on female protagonists, integration of historical context, and poetic prose — are frequently associated with Jianghu San Nüxia.

Among readers, Jianghu San Nüxia has garnered strong reception. The 2012 Sun Yat-Sen University Press edition holds a rating of 7.5 out of 10 from over 100 user ratings on Douban, with praise for its lyrical style, its depiction of emotional and familial complexities among the three heroines, and its blending of palace intrigue with jianghu adventure. The 1996 complete edition scores about 7.3 out of 10 with more user reviews; among the criticisms are occasional lapses in pacing, perceived inconsistencies in some character motivations, and that not all protagonists are equally compelling.

== Adaptations ==
In 1960, the novel was adapted into a Hong Kong film The Three Girl Fighters directed by Lee Fa, starring Siu-Yi Yung, Shangguan Junhui, Teresa Ha and Walter Tso.
