= Chinese swordsmanship =

Sword fighting traditions of China

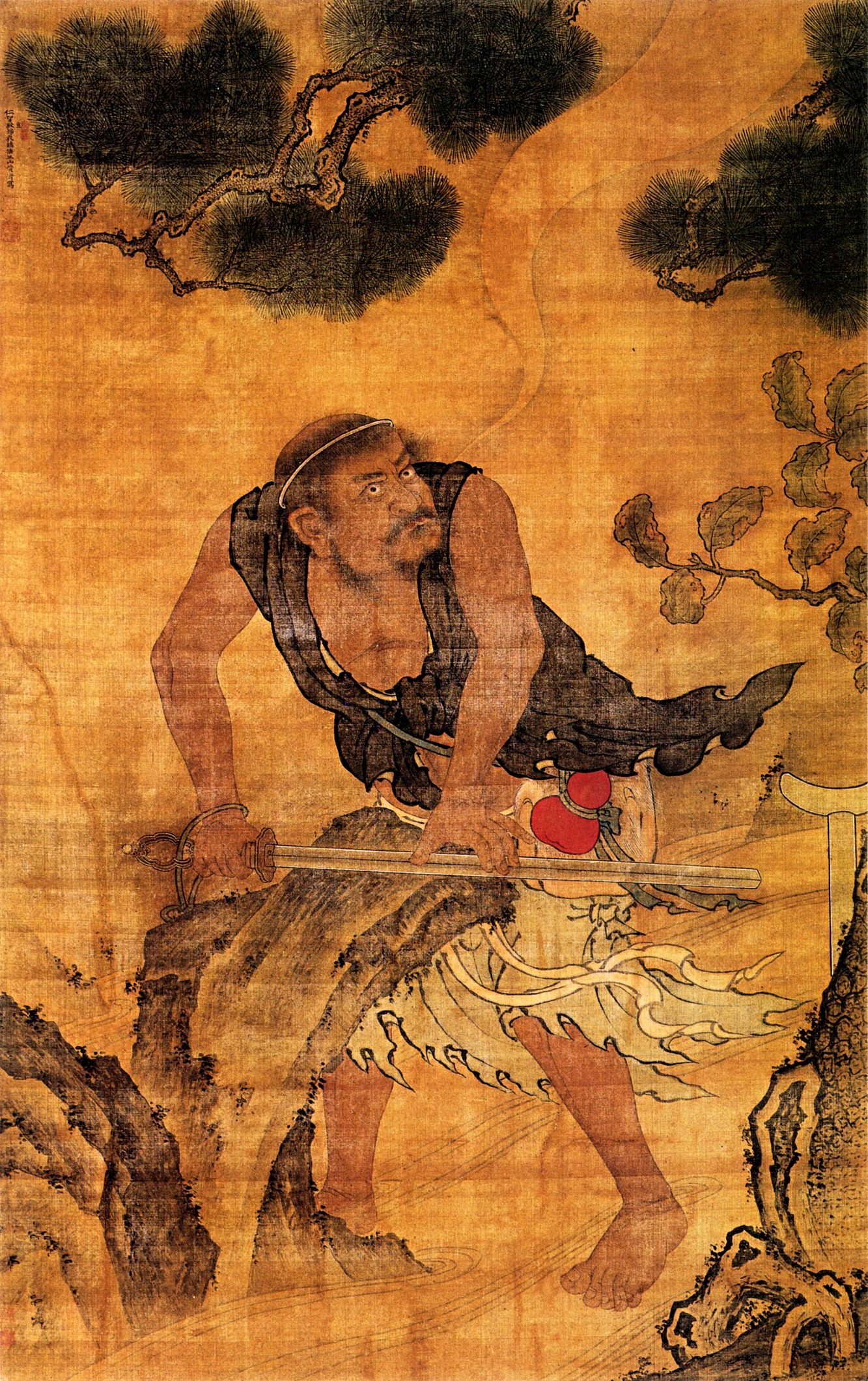
- Sword Sharpening (礪劍圖) by Huang Ji, c. 15th century
- Also known as: jianshu, daoshu
- Focus: Sword combat and solo forms
- Country of origin: Western Zhou

Chinese swordsmanship comprises the weapon fighting and solo form traditions of Chinese martial arts that employ indigenous sword types. Classical manuals and modern curricula divide Chinese swordplay into two main weapon families: jiànshù (劍術), the art of the straight double-edged jian, and dāoshù (刀術), the art of the curved or straight single-edged dao (sabre), alongside longer swords wielded with both hands such as the shuangshou jian and miaodao.

Archaeological finds and court chronicles trace sword use in China to bronze short blades of the Western Zhou and Spring and Autumn period, followed by longer iron and steel swords during the Warring States period and Han dynasty. After polearms and firearms displaced the straight sword on Ming and Qing battlefields, swordsmanship continued among civilian militias, escort guards, and regional martial lineages, and in the twentieth century branched into traditional family curricula and standardized sport wushu events.

== History and origins ==
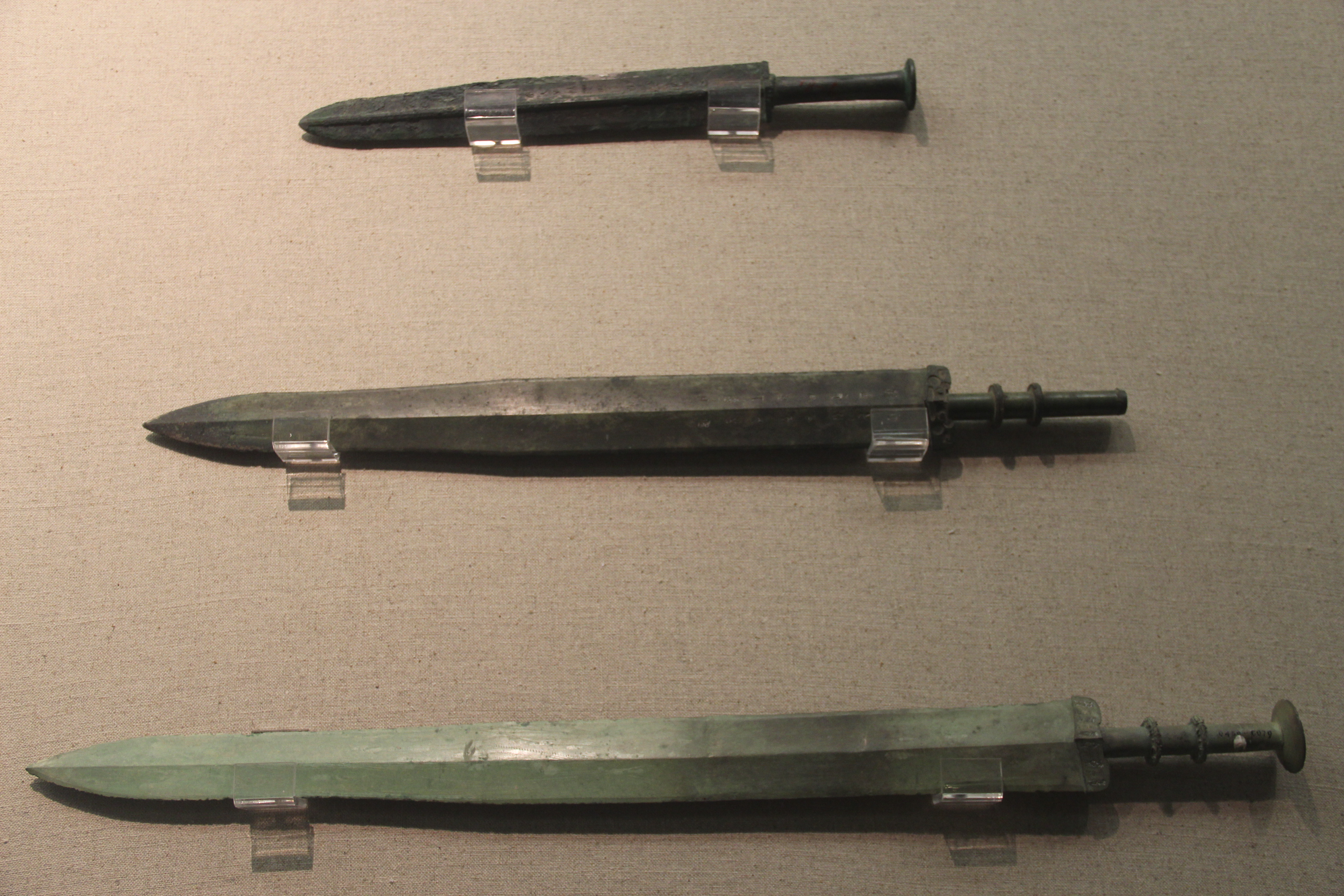
Spring and Autumn and Warring States bronze swords

Bronze short swords first appeared during the Western Zhou dynasty primarily as sidearms for close-quarters defense. During the Spring and Autumn period, advances in bronze casting yielded longer blades suited to infantry combat, and the portability of the sword encouraged dedicated fencing methods.

During the Han dynasty, as single-edged sabres (dao) with ring pommels gradually replaced the straight jian in cavalry and infantry service, fencing remained part of civilian physical training, dueling culture among officials and swordsmen, and court performance. The bibliographical treatise of the Book of Han (Hanshu) records a fencing manual titled Jian Dao (劍道, Way of the Sword) in 38 chapters under military skills, although the text was subsequently lost.

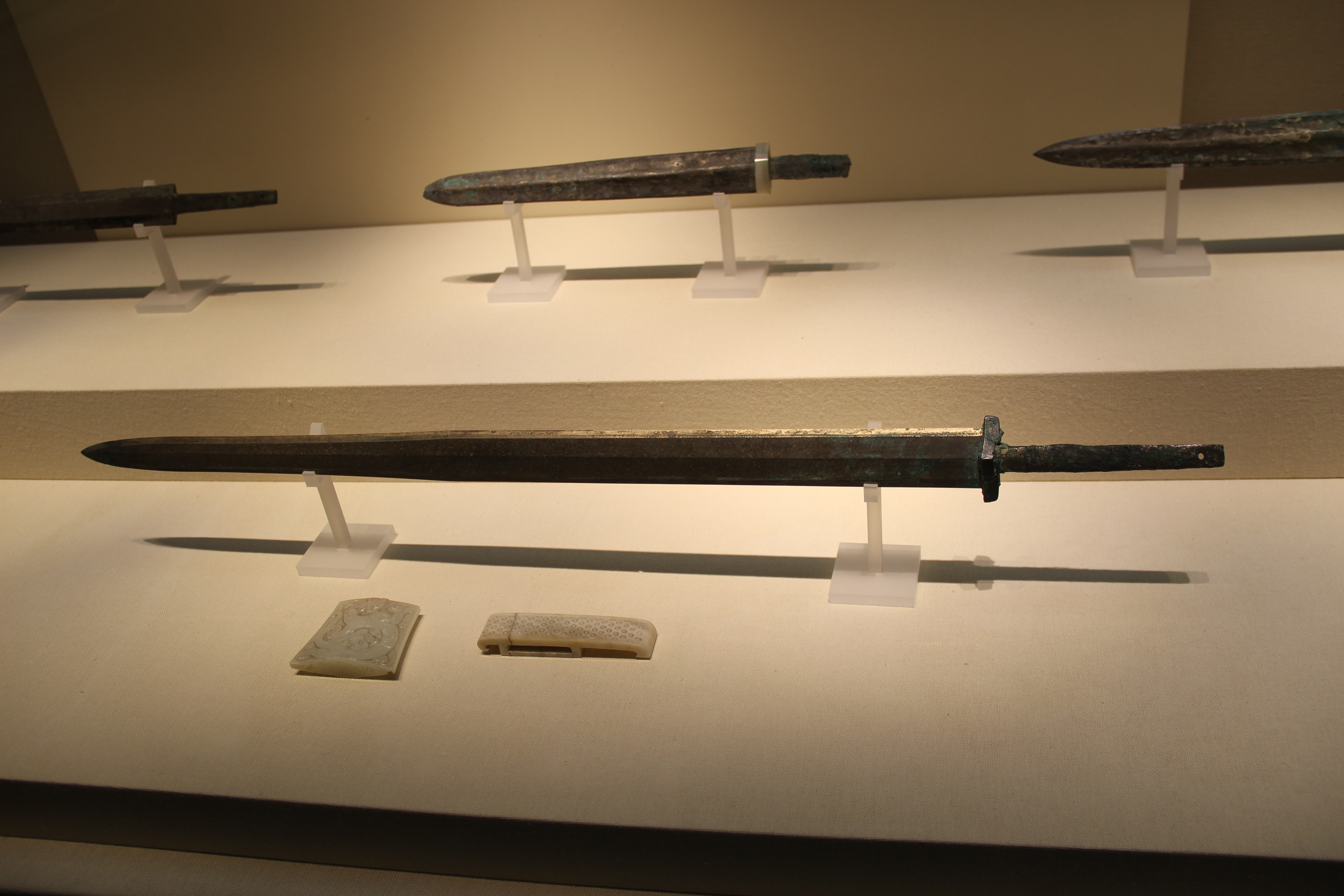
Han bronze swords

In the Tang dynasty, solo and paired sword dances (jianwu, 劍舞) were performed at court banquets and public gatherings, including the performances of Lady Gongsun recorded in poetry by Du Fu. Although artistic sword dances differed from battlefield combat, they preserved footwork, blade manipulation, and solo routine structures that informed later civilian martial sets.

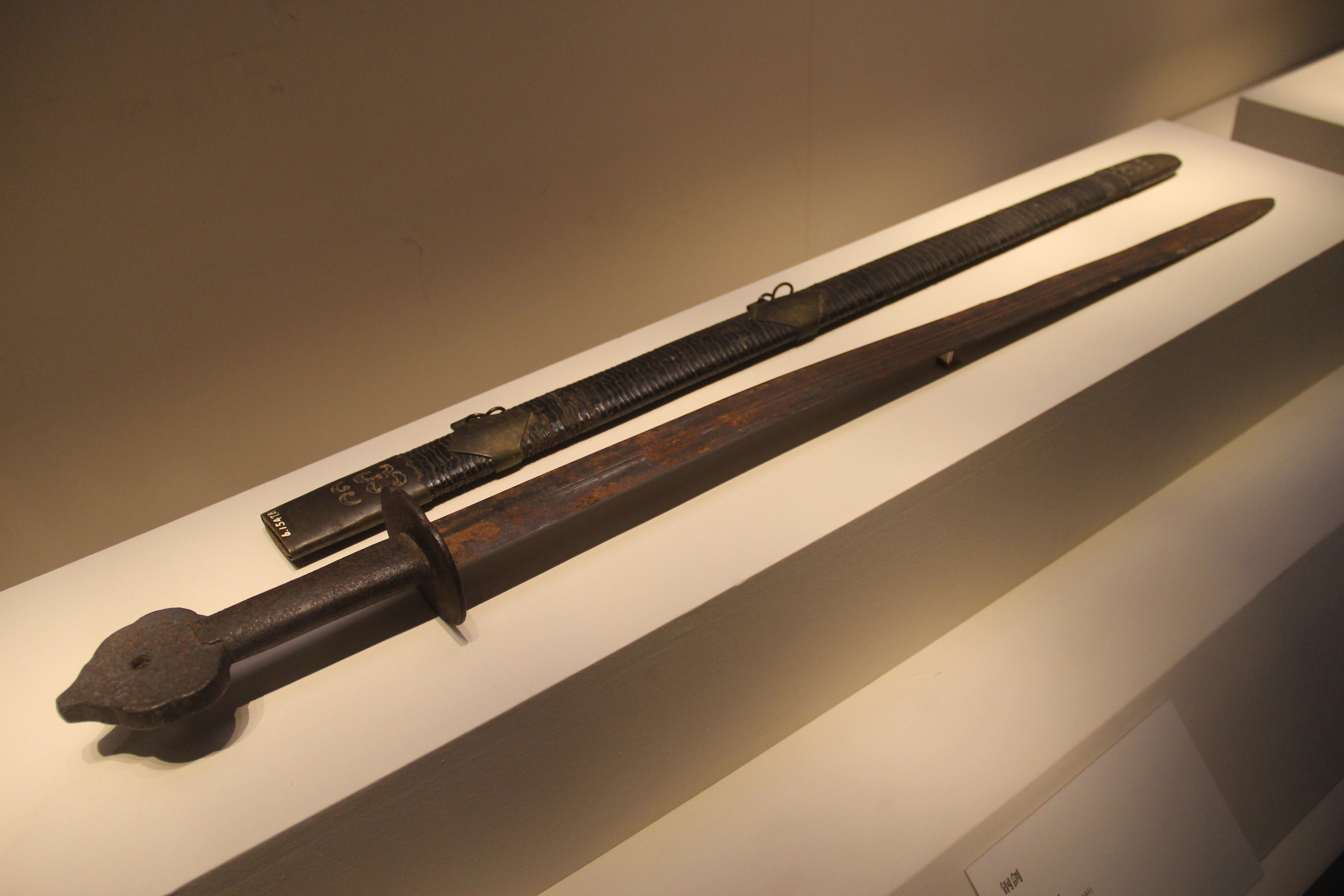
Ming steel sword

By the Ming dynasty, artillery, spears, and sabres dominated military service, whereas straight sword training continued largely among civilian martial artists, scholars, and local militias. Ming historical biographies and martial treatises document regional fencing traditions, including accounts in the History of Ming of sword masters such as Xu Fang of Tonglu County, Zhejiang.

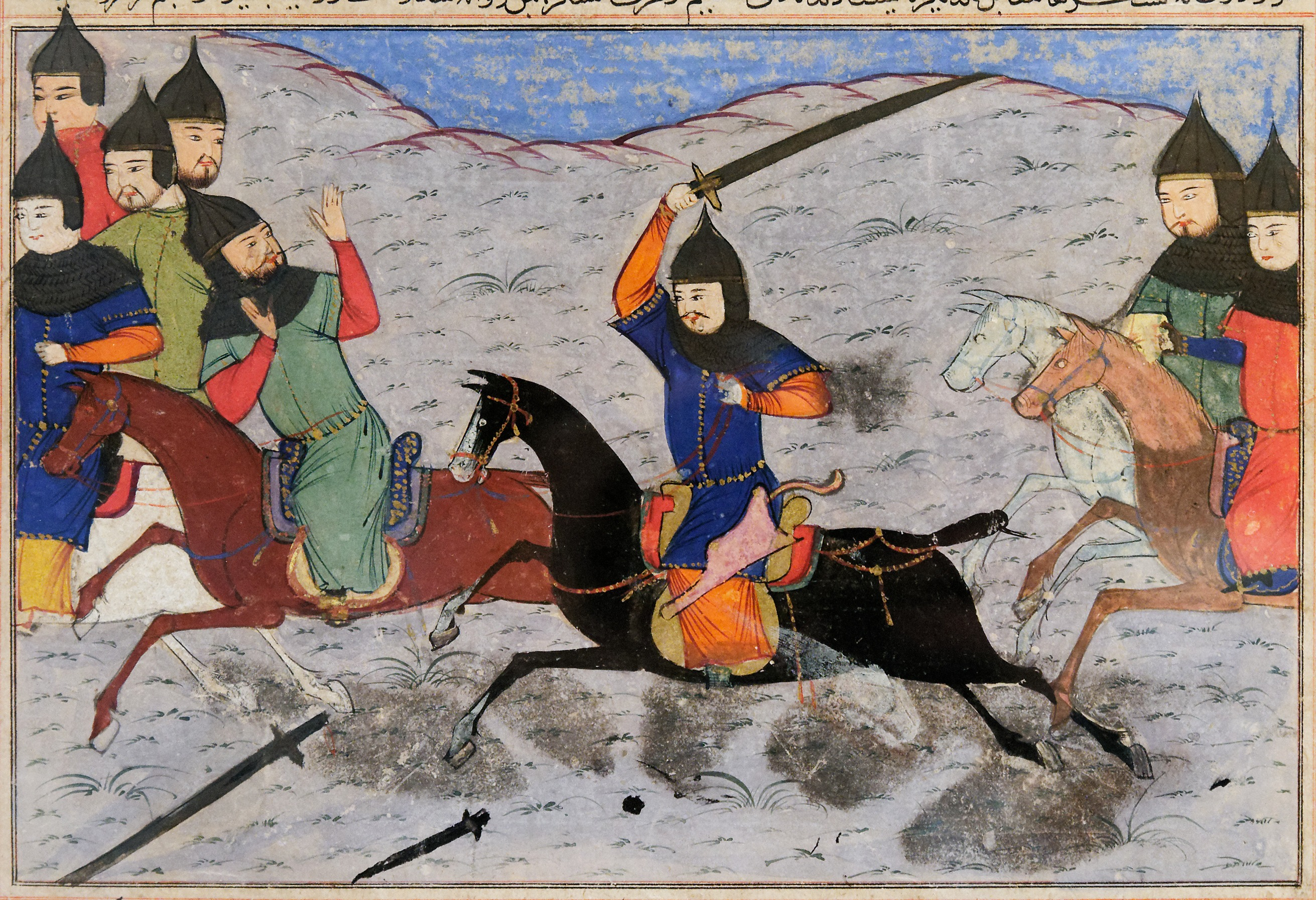
Persian depiction of Chinese swordsmen

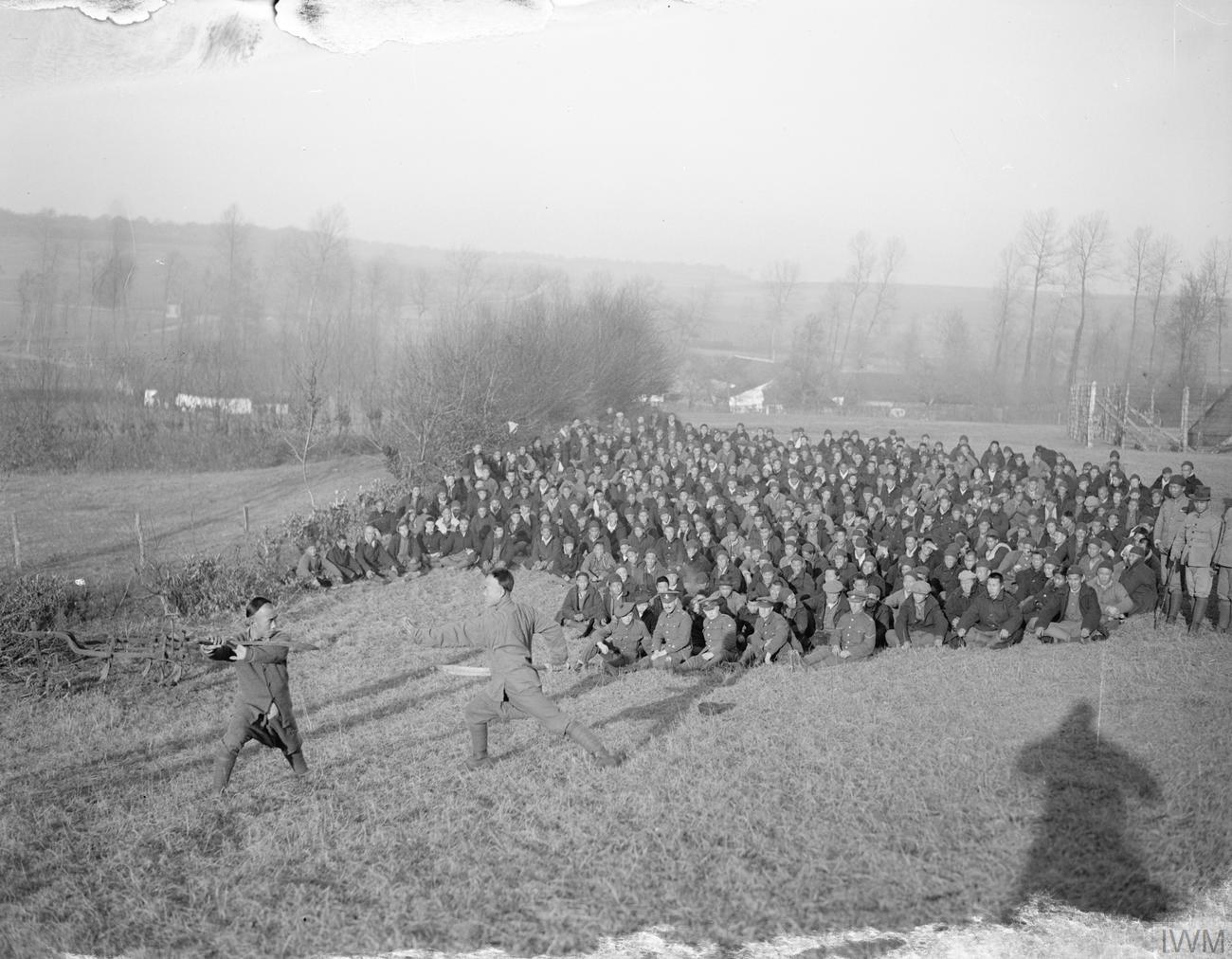
A sword display in a Chinese Labour Corps camp in Crecy Forest, France, 27 January 1918

== Major genres of Chinese swordsmanship ==
Civilian transmission produced numerous regional and family straight sword systems, among which taijijian, Wudang sword, Emei sword, and Qingping sword remain widely practiced.

=== Taijijian ===
Taijijian (太極劍) adapts the straight jian to the body mechanics and tactical principles of tai chi (taijiquan). Major family styles maintain distinct weapon curricula: Chen-style tai chi transmits a classical routine of 49 or 54 postures pairing silk reeling mechanics (chansijin) with brief releases of explosive force (fa jin), Yang-style tai chi transmits a traditional routine of 54 or 67 postures performed at an even tempo, and Wu-style tai chi preserves a routine of 108 postures. In 1957, Li Tianji and the Chinese Sports Commission compiled a simplified routine of 32 postures drawn mainly from Yang family swordsmanship, followed later by a standardized competition routine of 42 postures combining movements from multiple tai chi lineages. Classical manuals emphasize guiding the blade through intention (yi) rather than stiff muscular force and coordinate thirteen foundational techniques (including ci thrusting, dian pointing, liao upward slicing, and pi splitting) with waist rotation and paired sensitivity drills.

=== Wudang sword ===
Originating in martial traditions associated with the Wudang Mountains and Wudangquan, Wudang sword (Wudang jian, 武當劍) combines internal breathing exercises (neigong) with evasive stepping, circular deflections, and rapid counterattacks. Dissemination of the system in the early twentieth century owed much to General Li Jinglin, vice president of the Central Guoshu Institute in Nanjing, who taught solo sets alongside paired free sword sparring (duijian). Wudang methods favor agile footwork, sudden angle changes, and intercepting cuts to the opponent's wrist or forearm along the centerline rather than meeting heavy blows edge against edge.

=== Emei sword ===
Associated with martial lineages around Mount Emei in Sichuan, Emei sword (Emei jian, 峨眉劍) developed since the Ming period within regional Daoist and Buddhist traditions. The curriculum features low stances, compact wrist circles, and frequent changes of height and direction, using yielding deflections to draw an opponent off balance before counterthrusting.

=== Qingping sword ===
Qingping sword (Qingping jian, 青萍劍, named after a classical Daoist straight sword) is a northern straight sword system documented from the late Qing and Republican periods. Sharing tactical concepts with Wudang swordsmanship, Qingping routines alternate brisk turns, rising and dropping stances, and hard and soft power. Its footwork frequently uses diagonal crossing alignments in which the blade, torso, and legs move along contrasting lines, employing tactical retreat to open an angle for an immediate advance.

== Basic elements and training methods ==
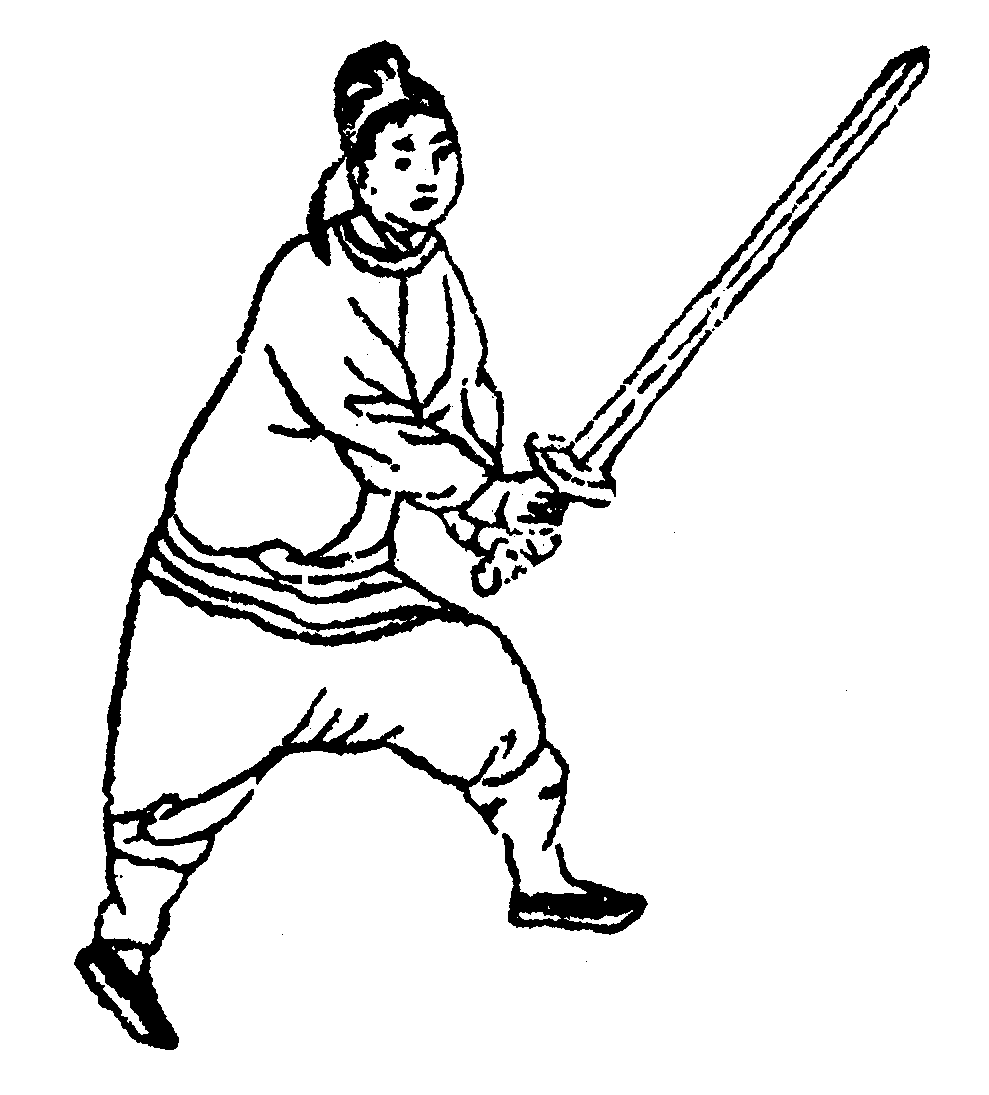
Illustration from a Ming martial manual

Foundational straight sword techniques include thrusting (ci), pointing (dian), splitting (pi), upward slicing (liao), parrying (ge), sweeping (xi), and intercepting (jie), each requiring coordination of footwork, waist rotation, and edge alignment. Because subtle blade redirection originates in the hand and forearm, instruction stresses a relaxed, supple wrist (鬆腕; sōng wàn) and a pliable "living grip" (活把; huó bǎ) rather than clamping the hilt with all five fingers, which locks the wrist joint and interrupts force transfer from the waist.

Solo drill repetition is combined with weighted wrist conditioning and the classical framework of the "Six Harmonies" (liuhe, 六合). The three internal harmonies coordinate heart or intent (xin), mind (yi), and breath or energy (qi) in a calm posture, while the three external harmonies align hand with foot, elbow with knee, and shoulder with hip. Traditional schools supplement solo sets with paired partner drills that develop tactile sensitivity (聽勁; tīngjìn) and distance judgment across blade contact.

Apparatus specifications vary according to training purpose. Contemporary sport wushu jianshu events employ lightweight spring steel foils (typically around 0.7 to 0.9 lb or 300 to 400 g) rolled thin near the point so the blade flexes and snaps audibly during rapid changquan sequences and aerial jumps. By contrast, traditional taijijian and internal straight sword practice in Chen, Yang, Wu, and Wudang lineages uses a heavier, unsharpened steel practice jian forged in centers such as Longquan from heat-treated martensitic stainless steel (such as 2Cr13 under Chinese standard GB/T 1220, comparable to AISI 420) or spring-tempered carbon steel. Built with a staged thickness taper, the two thirds nearest the guard remain rigid for structural alignment and parries, whereas the distal third flexes moderately on crisp pointing cuts (dian) and returns straight without audible tip chatter. Proportioned to practitioner height across blade lengths from 28 to 32 in (71 to 82 cm), traditional solo practice jian weigh around 1.30 to 1.39 lb (590 to 630 g) unscabbarded with a point of balance around 2.4 to 3.5 in (6.0 to 9.0 cm) ahead of the guard. Contemporary practice swords commonly pair corrosion-resistant cast alloy or brass Bagua guard, throat, and pommel fittings with a solid hardwood scabbard (such as jichi wood) seating a recessed protective liner inside the throat collar to prevent blade wear and buffer seasonal wood movement.

== Cultural significance ==
In classical Chinese literature, the straight jian acquired the epithet "gentleman of weapons" (百兵之君; bǎibīng zhī jūn) and was worn as an emblem of rank by court officials, Confucian scholars (junzi), and Daoist priests long after its battlefield role declined. Carrying and handling a straight sword signaled scholarly cultivation alongside martial readiness, distinguishing civil officials and literati swordsmen from ordinary soldiers armed with polearms or sabres.

Biographies of wandering swordsmen (youxia) in Sima Qian's Records of the Grand Historian and Tang dynasty chivalric tales (chuanqi) established literary archetypes that later shaped wuxia fiction, Chinese opera, and martial arts cinema. Within traditional martial schools, straight sword instruction was commonly reserved for experienced students who had already developed unarmed structure, footwork, and personal discipline.

== Modern practice and competition ==
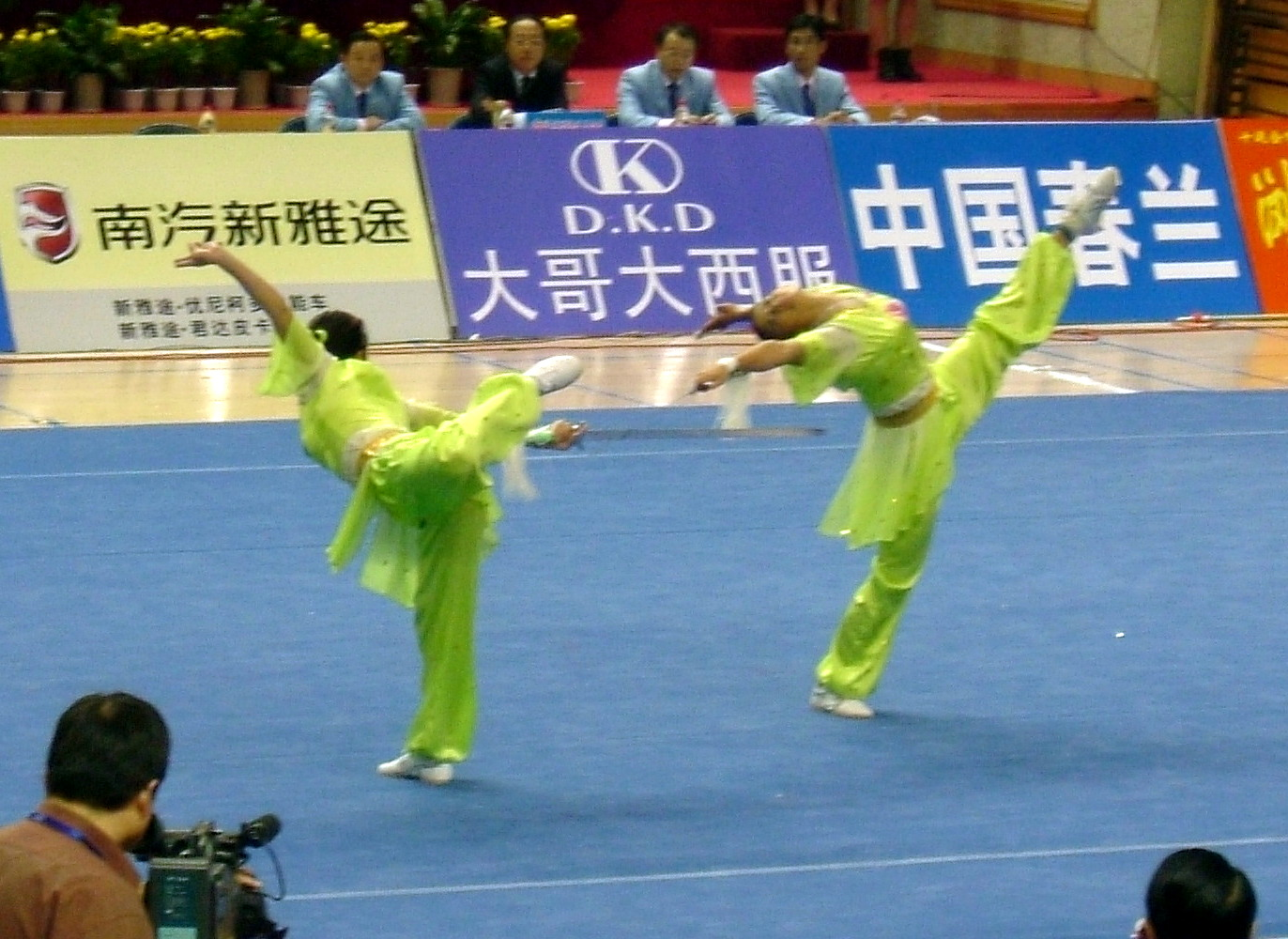
Choreographed jian event in modern wushu competition

After the founding of the People's Republic of China, state sports authorities organized standardized weapon routines for public physical education and performance. In November 1953, straight sword and sabre routines were included at the National Traditional Sports Meet in Tianjin. Public martial arts training and competitions were suspended during the Cultural Revolution before resuming in 1972.

Beginning in the 1980s, the General Administration of Sport of China hosted international tournaments, including the First International Tai Chi Invitational Competition in Wuhan in 1984 and the First International Wushu Invitational Competition in Xi'an in 1985. Following the establishment of the International Wushu Federation in 1990, standardized jianshu, daoshu, nandao, and taijijian routines became regular events at international championships, while the Chinese Wushu Association and traditional family lineages expanded instruction abroad.

== See also ==
- Butterfly sword
- Nandao
- Eighteen Arms of Wushu
- Japanese swordsmanship
- Korean swordsmanship
- French school of fencing
- German school of fencing
- Italian school of fencing
