= New Evening Post =

Hong Kong newspaper

- Type: Night newspaper
- Format: Broadsheet
- Founded: October 5, 1950
- Ceased publication: 1997
- Political alignment: Pro-Communist
- Language: Chinese (in Traditional Chinese characters)
- Headquarters: Hong Kong SAR, China
- Sister newspapers: Ta Kung Pao

New Evening Post
- Traditional Chinese: 新晚報
- Simplified Chinese: 新晚报
Transcriptions
Standard Mandarin
- Hanyu Pinyin: Xīnwǎn bào

The New Evening Post (Chinese: 新晚報) was a Hong Kong newspaper. It was the evening edition of Ta Kung Pao. It started printing on October 15, 1950, and stopped printing on July 27, 1997.

The famous novelist Jin Yong was an editor there in 1952. Jin Yong later founded Ming Pao.

== Namesake ==
In August 2012, a namesake free tabloid newspaper was launched by a company that was chaired by Ha Ping (Chinese: 夏萍). In 2014 it was ceased publication.
