= Wolf Devil Woman =

- Traditional Chinese: 狼女白魔
- Simplified Chinese: 狼女白魔
- Directed by: Pearl Chang
- Written by: Pearl Chang
- Produced by: Pearl Chang; Alan Wu
- Starring: Pearl Chang; Shih Feng; Shih Ying
- Cinematography: Chan Sin-lok
- Edited by: Wong Chau-kwai
- Music by: Tseng Chung-ching
- Release date: September 28, 1982
- Running time: 90 minutes
- Country: Taiwan
- Language: Mandarin

Wolf Devil Woman (Mandarin: 狼女白魔, pronounced Lang nu bai mo), also known as Wolfen Ninja, is a 1982 Taiwanese fantasy horror film starring, written, produced and directed by Pearl Chang.

The English-dubbed version of the film is notable for its bizarre vocal performances, particularly the vocal performance for the film's antagonist, "The Devil", who speaks like American cartoon character Yosemite Sam.

The film was followed by a 1983 sequel, Wolf Devil Woman 2, which also starred and was directed by Pearl Chang.

== Plot ==
A young girl is taken from the devil's region followers and raised in the wilderness of Cold Ice Peak. The girl is raised by the legendary White Wolf of a Thousand Years. "Legend of Cold Ice Peak" is the story of the wolf/woman that grows up in the snowy wilderness of the Cold Ice Peak, her mysterious traits of monster and animal that become folklore.

== Cast ==
- Pearl Chang
- Shih Feng
- Shih Ying
- Wang Hsieh
- Pa Ke
- Yi Hsiao-man
- Chang Yu-hsiang
- Yeh Chao-hsu
- Wang Pei-yi
- He Hsing-nan
- Hu Chung
- Su Yuen-feng

== See also ==
- Story of the White-Haired Demon Girl
- White Hair Devil Lady
- The Bride with White Hair
- The Bride with White Hair 2
- The Romance of the White Hair Maiden (1986 TV series)
- The Romance of the White Hair Maiden (1995 TV series)
- Romance of the White Haired Maiden (1999 TV series)
