= Angel is Coming =

- 今夜天使降临
- Written by: Yang Yang; Sang Ye; Tang Fangyuan; Xu Ran
- Directed by: Yang Yang
- Starring: Li Xiaoran; Ma Su; Liu Tao; Li Chen
- Country of origin: China
- Original language: Mandarin

Production
- Production companies: Beijing Golden Pond Film and Television Culture Co., Ltd.

Angel is Coming (Chinese name: 今夜天使降临) for China modern urban emotional light comedy, starring Li Xiaoran, Ma Su, Liu Tao and Li Chen. The play started in October 2012 and premiered on Zhejiang, Shenzhen and Shaanxi on July 31, 2013. In a relaxed and witty way, this play tells the story of the three best friends who, after an unexpected pregnancy, face the challenges of life, family, marriage and other aspects, to find love, family and nurture the meaning of a new life again.

== List of actors ==
=== Main actors ===
Actor	Role	Introduction
Li Xiaoran	Lin Ting	Obstetrician
Ma Su	Tian Tian	Company white-collar, Qi Jindong's wife
Liu Tao	Peng Jiajia	The young lady of a rich family, Kong Jiacheng's wife
Li Chen (actor)	Kong Jiacheng	Overseas returnees, second-generation entrepreneur, Peng Jiajia's husband
Tian Zheng	Qi Jindong	Tian Tian's husband, designer
Jiang Xiaochong	Dong Xiaowei	Lin Ting's assistant, obstetrics intern
A Nan	Tang Dawei	Lin Ting's secret husband
Bao Qijing	Kong Jiacheng's mother	Kong Jiacheng's mother, single parent, first-generation entrepreneur
Qin Hailu	Catherine	Kong Jiacheng's ex-girlfriend, corporate executive

== Anecdote ==
- More than a dozen Liu Tao fans protested against the explicit and ambiguous lines of the play at the public press conference in Beijing.
- In the third episode of the broadcast version of satellite TV, the whole scene of Liu Tao and Li Chen's car shock and the six-minute field scene was deleted.
