= 白髮魔女傳 =

白髮魔女傳 or 白发魔女传, literally 'The Legend of the White-haired Witch', may refer to:

- Baifa Monü Zhuan, a wuxia novel by Gu Long
- The Bride with White Hair, 1993 Hong Kong wuxia film
- The Bride with White Hair (TV series), 2012 Chinese television series
- White Hair Devil Lady, 1980 Hong Kong film
- The White Haired Witch of Lunar Kingdom, 2014 Chinese wuxia-fantasy film
