= The Romance of the White Hair Maiden =

The Romance of the White Hair Maiden may refer to:

- The Romance of the White Hair Maiden (1986 TV series)
- The Romance of the White Hair Maiden (1995 TV series)
