= Saiwai Qixia Zhuan =

1955 wuxia novel by Liang Yusheng

- cover of the 1984 Cosmos Books edition
- Author: Liang Yusheng
- Original title: 塞外奇俠傳
- Language: Chinese
- Genre: Wuxia
- Set in: 17th-century China
- Publisher: Chou Mo Pao
- Publication date: 1955 - 1957
- Publication place: Hong Kong
- Media type: Print
- ISBN: 9789576458231
- Preceded by: Baifa Monü Zhuan
- Followed by: Qijian Xia Tianshan

Saiwai Qixia Zhuan
- Traditional Chinese: 塞外奇俠傳
- Simplified Chinese: 塞外奇侠传
- Literal meaning: Legend of the Gallant Hero Beyond the Frontier
Transcriptions
Standard Mandarin
- Hanyu Pinyin: Sài Wài Qí Xiá Zhuàn
Yue: Cantonese
- Jyutping: Coi^{3} Ngoi^{6} Kei^{4} Hap^{6} Cyun^{4}

Feihongjin
- Traditional Chinese: 飛紅巾
- Simplified Chinese: 飞红巾
- Literal meaning: Flying Red Sash
Transcriptions
Standard Mandarin
- Hanyu Pinyin: Fēi Hóng Jīn
Yue: Cantonese
- Jyutping: Fei^{1} Hung^{4} Gan^{1}

Saiwai Qixia Zhuan (塞外奇俠傳), literally Legend of the Gallant Hero Beyond the Frontier, is a wuxia novel by Liang Yusheng. It was first published as a serial between 1955 and 1957 in the Hong Kong newspaper Chou Mo Pao (周末報). The novel is also known by an alternative title, Feihongjin (飛紅巾; "Flying Red Sash").

Set in 17th-century China during the early Qing dynasty, it follows the adventures of the swordsman Yang Yuncong, who becomes entangled in the resistance of frontier tribes against Qing imperial expansion. The novel continues the narrative of Baifa Monü Zhuan and precedes Qijian Xia Tianshan, forming the second part of the Tianshan series.

== Publication history ==
Saiwai Qixia Zhuan was first published as a serial between 1955 and 1957 in the Hong Kong newspaper Chou Mo Pao (周末報). Subsequent reprints include a 1984 edition by Cosmos Books, a 1988 edition by China Folk Literature and Art Publishing House, another 1988 edition by China Agricultural Publishing House, and a 2012 two-volume edition (combined with Qijian Xia Tianshan) by the Sun Yat-Sen University Press.

== Plot summary ==
The story is set in 17th-century China during the early Qing dynasty. The Uyghur tribes in Xinjiang are under attack by Qing forces seeking to subjugate them. Yang Yuncong, a swordsman of the Mount Heaven Sect, joins their resistance and earns the tribes' respect. He is later betrayed by his junior Chu Zhaonan, who has defected to the Qing forces. During their duel, the two are caught in a sandstorm and separated. Yang Yuncong, gravely injured, is rescued by Nalan Minghui, a Qing general's daughter who secretly nurses him back to health and helps him escape.

Afterwards, Yang Yuncong meets Hamaya, a heroine among the Uyghur tribes. Hamaya seeks vengeance on the singer Yabulu, whose betrayal had led to her father's death. With Yang Yuncong's help, she avenges her father and fends off an ambush by Chu Zhaonan and Qing forces. Later, with Yang Yuncong's support, she wins a martial arts contest and becomes the new chief of her tribe, secretly falling in love with Yang Yuncong.

Yang Yuncong continues to aid the tribes against the Qing forces. He reunites with Nalan Minghui and they fall deeply in love despite being on opposing sides. However, Nalan Minghui has been betrothed to the Qing prince Dodo. In despair, Yang Yuncong and Nalan Minghui consummate their love, and she becomes pregnant with his child.

Hamaya confesses her feelings to Yang Yuncong but is gently rejected. A heartbroken Hamaya's hair turns white overnight and she abruptly leaves. Deprived of her leadership, the tribes suffer a devastating defeat by Qing forces. Yang Yuncong later leaves Xinjiang upon learning that Nalan Minghui and Dodo's wedding will take place in Hangzhou.

== Principal characters ==
- Yang Yuncong (楊雲驄) – Yang Lian's son who was raised and trained in swordsmanship by Master Huiming of the Mount Heaven Sect. He aids the Uyghur tribes resisting the Qing government's subjugation.
- Hamaya (哈瑪雅), nicknamed "Flying Red Sash" (飛紅巾) – Lian Nichang's apprentice and a tribal chief's daughter. Her unrequited love for Yang Yuncong and her transformation mirror her master's tragic legacy.
- Nalan Minghui (納蘭明慧) – the daughter of the Qing general Nalan Xiuji. Compassionate yet bound by filial duty, she falls in love with Yang Yuncong while engaged to Prince Dodo.
- Chu Zhaonan (楚昭南) – Master Huiming's second apprentice. Ambitious and ruthless, he betrays the Mount Heaven Sect and serves the Qing government, becoming Yang Yuncong's nemesis.
- Dodo (多鐸) – a Qing prince whose arranged marriage to Nalan Minghui sets him in opposition to Yang Yuncong.
- Yabulu (押不廬) – a singer who is Hamaya's ex-lover. His betrayal of their tribe leads to her father's death and catalyses Hamaya's transformation.
- Master Huiming (晦明禪師) – the founder of the Mount Heaven Sect. A bridge between generations, his teachings link the tragic heroism of Baifa Monü Zhuan to the moral idealism of the rest of the Tianshan series.

== Reception and legacy ==
Saiwai Qixia Zhuan is recognised for being part of Liang Yusheng's early works that gave rise to the "new school" of wuxia fiction in Hong Kong in the 1950s. It marks Liang Yusheng's deepening integration of the themes of historical realism, moral idealism, and romantic tragedy which were first explored in Baifa Monü Zhuan.

On Douban, Saiwai Qixia Zhuan holds a score of 6.8 out of 10, receiving mixed but generally positive responses. Readers often praise its poetic depiction of the northern frontier and its strong female characters, but some consider its plot less intricate than in Liang Yusheng's longer works.

Critics identify the novel as part of Liang Yusheng's pioneering contribution to modern wuxia fiction for blending historical context with chivalric ideals and introspective characterisation. It has also been noted for its portrayal of frontier cultures and ethnic encounters as a means of exploring loyalty, identity, and resistance. Some scholars have debated its exact place in Liang Yusheng's publication chronology due to discrepancies in the dating and serialisation of his early works.

== Adaptations ==
In 1996, the novel was adapted into a Singaporean television series Legend of the White Hair Brides by TCS, starring Huang Biren, Lina Ng and Ann Kok.

In 2005, Saiwai Qixia Zhuan and its sequel Qijian Xia Tianshan were adapted into a Chinese television series Seven Swordsmen produced by Tsui Hark and directed by Clarence Fok, starring Vincent Zhao, Wang Xuebing, Ray Lui, Ada Choi, Qiao Zhenyu, Li Xiaoran and Wang Likun.
