= Cheng Kun =

Cheng Kun may refer to the following:

- Cheng Kun (成昆), a fictional character in the novel The Heaven Sword and Dragon Saber
- Cheng Kun (成坤), a fictional character in the novel Baifa Monü Zhuan
- Chengdu-Kunming railway (成昆铁路), a railway line in southern China
