= Tianzheng =

Tianzheng was a Chinese era name used by several emperors of China. It may refer to:

- Tianzheng (天正, 551), era name used by Xiao Dong, emperor of the Liang dynasty, later continued by Xiao Ji until 553
- Tianzheng (天政, 1103–1104), era name used by Duan Zhengchun, emperor of Dali

== See also ==
- Tian Zheng, Chinese-American statistician
