= Legend of the White Hair Brides =

1996 Singaporean TV series

- Poster
- 塞外奇侠
- Genre: Wuxia
- Based on: Baifa Monü Zhuan, Saiwai Qixia Zhuan and Qijian Xia Tianshan by Liang Yusheng
- Screenplay by: Chen Xiuqun
- Directed by: Sun Xueping; Xu Weiguang; Mahasati
- Starring: Huang Biren; Lina Ng; Ann Kok
- Theme music composer: Jeremy Chang; Ng Yuk-man; Wong Man
- Opening theme: "If Heaven Has Feelings" (天若有情) by Jeremy Chang
- Ending theme: "Reunion" (重逢) by Shirley Kwan; "Lotus in the Snow" (雪中莲) by Faye Wong
- Country of origin: Singapore
- Original language: Mandarin
- No. of episodes: 21

Production
- Executive producers: Huang Zhuoxiong; Ge Hongfa; Hu'erxide
- Producer: Sun Xueping
- Production locations: Xinjiang; Shanghai
- Cinematography: Xia Qi; Zhang Jiayu
- Running time: ≈ 45 minutes per episode
- Production companies: TCS; Shanghai Oriental TV

Original release
- Network: TCS-8
- Release: 6 February 1996

Legend of the White Hair Brides (塞外奇侠) is a Singaporean television series adapted from the wuxia novels Baifa Monü Zhuan, Saiwai Qixia Zhuan and Qijian Xia Tianshan by Liang Yusheng. It was first broadcast on TCS-8 in 1996 in Singapore.

== Synopsis ==
The series is set in 17th-century China during the early Qing dynasty. Zhuo Yihang, a Wudang Sect swordsman, is in love with the outlaw leader Lian Nichang, but his fellow Wudang Sect members oppose their relationship. After mistakenly believing that Zhuo Yihang has betrayed her, a heartbroken Lian Nichang's hair turns white overnight and she becomes known as the "White-Haired Demoness". Zhuo Yihang finds a rare flower on Mount Heaven that can turn white hair dark again, but his apprentice Xin Longzi accidentally destroys it.

Meanwhile, Master Huiming of the Mount Heaven Sect accepts two boys, Yang Yuncong and Chu Zhaonan, as his apprentices and trains them in swordsmanship. Several years later, Yang Yuncong gets into a love triangle with Nalan Minghui, a Qing general's daughter, and "Flying Red Sash" Hamaya, Lian Nichang's apprentice. The one he truly loves is Nalan Minghui, whom he secretly has a daughter with. However, they cannot be together as Nalan Minghui has been betrothed to the Qing prince Dodo. When Yang Yuncong rejects Hamaya, her hair also turns white overnight just like her master. She kidnaps Yang Yuncong's baby daughter Yilan Zhu and raises her as her apprentice.

In the meantime, Chu Zhaonan, tempted by fame and wealth, betrays the Mount Heaven Sect and serves the Qing government. Over 20 years later, a grown-up Yilan Zhu also ends up having her hair turn white overnight after a failed romance with Zhang Huazhao. Yang Yuncong and Hamaya meet again on Mount Heaven and team up to defeat Chu Zhaonan. Yilan Zhu hopes to help her father reconcile with Hamaya, but they refuse and go separate ways.

== Cast ==
- Huang Biren as Lian Nichang
- Lina Ng as Hamaya
- Ann Kok as Nalan Minghui / Yilan Zhu
- Qin Wei as Yang Yuncong
- Shen Huihao as Chu Zhaonan
- Yuan Wenqing as Zhuo Yihang
- Zheng Wenquan as Zhang Huazhao
- Liang Weidong as Dodo
- Ge Hongfa as Master Huiming
- Hao Ping as Xin Longzi

== See also ==
- Seven Swordsmen
