= Law Yim-hing =

Chinese actress and Cantonese opera singer

- Chinese: 羅艷卿
- Born: 1929 (age 96–97); Guangdong Province, China
- Other names: Law Yim Hing, Lo Yen-Hsing, Luo Yan-qing, Lo Yim-Hing, Luo Yanqing
- Occupations: Cantonese opera singer; actress
- Years active: 1948–1969
- Spouse: Ho Fei-Fan (m. 1953; div. 1957)

Law Yim-hing (Chinese: 羅艷卿) is a former Chinese actress and Cantonese opera singer from Hong Kong. Law is credited with over 330 films.

== Early life ==
In 1929, Law was born in Guangdong Province, China.

== Career ==
At age 10, Law began training in Cantonese opera from Sit Kok-sin. In 1948, Law crossed over as an actress in Hong Kong films. By age 19, Law first appeared in Five Rascals in the Eastern Capital (Part 1), a 1948 Martial Arts film directed by Wong Hok-Sing. With Law's martial arts skills, she appeared as a lead actress in many Martial Arts films. Law appeared as Lady Knight Red-Garbed in Thirteen Heroes with Seven Swords (Part 1 and Part 2), a 1949 Martial Arts film directed by Ku Wen-Chung. Law also appeared with Yam Kim-fai in many films, including Playboy Emperor, a 1953 Historic Drama Musical film directed by Ku Wen-Chung and How Di Qing and the 5 Tigers Conquered the West, a 1962 Cantonese opera film directed by Chu Kei. Law's last film as a lead is The Sword that Vanquished the Monster, a 1969 Martial Arts film directed by Wu Pang. Law's last film is Love Me and Dad, a 1988 Drama film directed by Stephen Shin Gei-Yin. Law is one of the 'Eight Peonies'. Law is credited with over 330 films.

== Repertoire ==
- Two Heroic Families
- Power and Dilemma
- The Villain, The General and the Heroic Beauty
- Danfeng fei lin ye he jia
- Feng liu tian zi
- Pi pa xue ran han gong hua

== Filmography ==
=== Films ===
This is a partial list of films.

- 1948 Rascals in the Eastern Capital (Part 1)
- 1949 Thirteen Heroes with Seven Swords (Part 1 and Part 2)
- 1953 Playboy Emperor
- 1955 Punish the Unfaithful – Kam Yuk-lo
- 1957 Romance of Jade Hall (Part 1) (a.k.a. My Kingdom for a Husband) – The Queen
- 1958 The Beauty Who Lived Through Great Changes (a.k.a. True Love)
- 1959 Beauty Slain by the Sword
- 1959 Story of the White-Haired Demon Girl (Part 1)
- 1960 An Ancient Bride
- 1960 The Marriage of the Beautiful Corpse
- 1960 Silly Wong Growing Rich
- 1960 The Stubborn Generations - Leung Yu-Chu
- 1960 Three Females - Leung Kit-Yu
- 1961 The Chilly River Pass – Fan Lei-Fa
- 1962 How Di Qing and the 5 Tigers Conquered the West – Tik Ching and Princess Sheung Yeung
- 1963 Poor Lady Ping (a.k.a. Tragic Love of Ping Kei) – Bai Ping-kei
- 1964 Filial Sons and Grandchildren (a.k.a. Our Family) – wife
- 1967 The Butterfly Legend - Chow Yan, the male lead (a.k.a. Zhou Ren in Qinqiang; The Supreme Sacrifice by Zhou Ren)
- 1967 The Seven Swords and the Thirteen Heroes (a.k.a. Seven Knights and Thirteen Chivalrous Men)
- 1969 The Sword that Vanquished the Monster

== Theater performance ==
=== Passing of Sit Kok Sin in 1956 ===
Time to Go Home
The Marriage of the Top Scholar
The Dream Encounter Between Emperor Wu of Han and Lady Wa
With Leung So-Kam (Chinese: 梁素琴) as second lead actress

=== July 1957 ===
Lady White Snake, with Ho-Kau Chan as second lead actress
Queen of the Stage (a.k.a. Marriage Is a Life-Long Business)

Law pointed out the selflessness of all lead actors with seniority in the Sit clan because she was the lead actress sharing the limelight with the most junior student of Sit, not withstanding the lack of experience, market value or contribution in the events.

Close-knit culture is still the tradition upheld by all today in this entertainment business generally. By that, students are awarded roles/opportunities in the performances of own masters/teachers/parents without proving their abilities to financial backers or organizing committee in those publicly funded events.

In return, the said junior student was expected to be grateful for being given an opportunity as the center of such attention to debut on stage. That junior student of Sit did not talk about this flopped debut or reprise those roles/titles.

== Discography ==
- RLP 2001, 1966, Two Heroic Families

== Personal life ==
Law's husband was Ho Fei-Fan (1919–1980), an actor.
