= Henry Fong Ping =

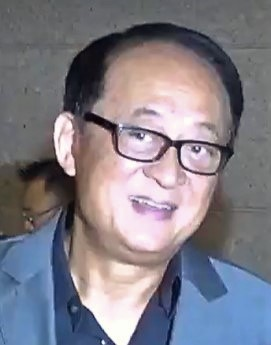
- Born: Hong Kong
- Occupation: Film producer

Henry Fong Ping (Chinese: 方平) is a Hong Kong film producer.

Fong met actress Nina Paw in 1968 not long after her entry into the entertainment industry, when the two attended a training class for new Great Wall Movie Enterprises actors. He became romantically involved with her in 1979 during the filming of White Hair Devil Lady. Paw's father objected to the relationship, but nevertheless, the couple married and had their first daughter the following year.
