= Seven Swordsmen =

2006 Chinese TV series

- DVD cover art
- 七剑下天山
- Genre: Wuxia
- Based on: Saiwai Qixia Zhuan and Qijian Xia Tianshan by Liang Yusheng
- Screenplay by: Li Changfu
- Directed by: Clarence Fok
- Presented by: Zhu Tong; Ma Zhongjun; Deng Fan; Tie Fo
- Starring: Vincent Zhao; Wang Xuebing; Ray Lui; Ada Choi; Qiao Zhenyu; Li Xiaoran; Wang Likun
- Opening theme: "Ayiyahei" (阿伊呀嘿) by Wang Yong and Yu Jiangying
- Ending theme: "Empty Ship" (空船) by Ke Yimin
- Country of origin: China
- Original language: Mandarin
- No. of episodes: 34

Production
- Executive producers: Tsui Hark; Tie Fo
- Producers: Ma Zhongjun; Wang Yong; Wu Libo
- Production location: China
- Running time: ≈ 45 minutes per episode
- Production company: Ciwen Pictures

Related
- Seven Swords (2005)

Seven Swordsmen (七剑下天山) is a 2006 Chinese wuxia television series directed by Clarence Fok and produced by Tsui Hark. The series is loosely adapted from the novels Qijian Xia Tianshan and Saiwai Qixia Zhuan by Liang Yusheng. It is also the television series counterpart to the 2005 film Seven Swords, which was also directed and produced by Tsui Hark. This series was originally planned to be the first season of a longer television series but the project has been abandoned.

== Synopsis ==
The series takes place in 17th-century China during the early Qing dynasty. Fearing resistance from the wulin, the Qing government bans the practice of martial arts and possession of weapons. Dokado, a Qing prince, leads troops to enforce the order and attacks a village sheltering an anti-Qing rebel group. Two rebels – Han Zhibang and Wu Yuanying – escape with help from Fu Qingzhu, a former executioner seeking redemption, and the three travel to Mount Heaven to request aid from the reclusive swordmaster Huiming.

Huiming sends his four apprentices – Chu Zhaonan, Yang Yuncong, Xin Longzi and Mulang – to join the trio on their heroic quest and gives each of them a unique sword. Calling themselves the "Seven Swords", the seven swordsmen return to fend off an attack by Qing forces and protect the villagers as they evacuate. While hiding in a cave system, they discover a spy in their midst who repeatedly sabotages them and frames Yang Yuncong. After fighting their way out of the caves, the Seven Swords separate. Han Zhibang and Mulang stay with the villagers to protect them, while Fu Qingzhu, Xin Longzi, and Wu Yuanying head to Beijing.

Meanwhile, Chu Zhaonan is captured by the Qing general Fenghuo Liancheng and falls in love with the general's slave, Lüzhu, who later dies helping him escape. In the northwest, Chu Zhaonan reunites with Yang Yuncong, now aligned with an anti-Qing tribal group led by Feihongjin. Yang Yuncong is wounded in battle and rescued by Nalan Minghui, a Qing general's daughter. They fall in love and secretly have a daughter even though Nalan Minghui is already promised in marriage to Dokado.

In Beijing, Fu Qingzhu, Xin Longzi and Wu Yuanying attempt to assassinate the Shunzhi Emperor but end up saving him from a palace coup instead. Meanwhile in Hangzhou, Han Zhibang becomes the rebel group's new leader for his heroism in rescuing his captured comrades.

When the Seven Swords reunite, Chu Zhaonan feigns defection to get close enough to assassinate Dokado, but the plan collapses when Dokado exposes him and forces him to kill rebel captives. His actions create suspicion among the rebels and his fellow swordsmen, especially after he accidentally kills the village chief.

To prove his loyalty, Chu Zhaonan challenges Dokado to a duel at the Qiantang River and calls the other swordsmen to join him. Dokado is defeated, but the Seven Swords fall apart as a result: Yang Yuncong is killed, Xin Longzi loses his sanity and disappears, Mulang returns to Mount Heaven in guilt after carelessly allowing a spy into the rebels' base, and Chu Zhaonan wanders off deeply traumatised. Fu Qingzhu and Wu Yuanying search for the missing members, while Han Zhibang remains with the surviving rebels.

== List of episodes ==
1. "Swordsmen from Mount Heaven" 天山剑客
2. "The Seven Swords" 七剑
3. "Battle of Boye" 决战博野
4. "Yufang is Poisoned" 郁芳中毒
5. "The Real and Fake Secret Passages" 真假秘道
6. "The Qinggan's True Nature" 青干本色
7. "Mulang's Blood" 穆郎的血
8. "The Young's Sorrow" 悲情由龙
9. "Lüzhu is Heartless" 绿珠无情
10. "Yufang's Wedding" 郁芳婚礼
11. "The Desert Eagles" 沙漠之鹰
12. "Flying Shadow and Red Sash" 飞影红巾
13. "Qinggan and Youlong" 青干由龙
14. "Chivalrous Bones and Tender Feelings" 侠骨柔情
15. "Nalan Minghui" 纳兰明慧
16. "Children in a Chaotic World" 乱世儿女
17. "A Sacrifice to End the War" 止战之殇
18. "Iron Blood and Loyal Heart" 铁血丹心
19. "Heroic Shadows in the Capital" 京城侠影
20. "Dokado's Rise to Power" 多格多争霸
21. "Ten Days' Siege" 十日围城
22. "Meeting of Dragons and Tigers" 龙虎会
23. "Gathering of Heroes" 聚义风云
24. "Mystery of the Tangerine Orchard" 桔园之谜
25. "Riyue and Sheshen" 日月舍神
26. "Guild Master Han Zhibang" 舵主韩志邦
27. "Turmoil in Hangzhou" 杭州风暴
28. "Crisis in Lantern-lit Streets" 灯笼坊风暴
29. "Pretending to Surrender to Dokado" 诈降多格多
30. "The Youlong Changes Colour" 变色由龙
31. "Irreconcilable Powers" 势不两立
32. "Minghui's Wedding" 明慧大婚
33. "The Breaking" 决裂
34. "Final Battle at the Qiantang River" 决战钱塘江

== Cast ==
- Vincent Zhao as Chu Zhaonan
- Wang Xuebing as Yang Yuncong
- Ji Chunhua as Xin Longzi
- Qiao Zhenyu as Mulang
- Zhang Bo as Han Zhibang
- Sang Weilin as Wu Yuanying
- Yu Chenghui as Fu Qingzhu
- Ray Lui as Dokado
- Ada Choi as Feihongjin
- Li Xiaoran as Nalan Minghui
- Wang Likun as Liu Yufang
- Bryan Leung as Liu Jingyi
- Askar Maimaiti as Aierjiang
- Sun Feifei as Dong Xiaowan
- Edell Aidai as Lüzhu
- Eryang as Nalan Xiuji
- Xu Xiangdong as Niuhuru
- Sun Jiankui as Qi Zhenjun
- Tan Kai as Fenghuo Liancheng
- Gao Lu as Chuntao
- Xie Zhenwei as the Shunzhi Emperor
- Dai Chunrong as Empress Dowager Xiaozhuang
- Kent Tong as Aolong
- Guo Hongjie as Zhang Chengbin
- Liu Tieyong as Zhang Kui
- Zhang Xin as Qiu Dongluo
- Wang Huarong as Zhang Huazhao
- Ma Ji as Gu Sandao
- Chen Zhou as Zhang Laifu
- Zheng Li as Zhou Chaotai
- Zhou He as Shao Zhanpeng
- Milading as Ailike
- Dilireba'ao as Manlingna
- Ma Jingwu as Master Huiming
- Zhu Feng as Mao Pijiang
- Wang Xinfen as Lian Nichang
- Yuan Bin as Xinhen
- Huo Yaoliang as Shoula
- He Qing as Beibi
- Wang Yong as Wuchi

== See also ==
- Seven Swords
- Legend of the White Hair Brides
