= Show Me Your Love (film) =

2016 Hong Kong film by Ryon Lee

- Theatrical release poster
- Chinese: 大手牽小手
- Directed by: Ryon Lee
- Screenplay by: Ryon Lee
- Starring: Nina Paw; Raymond Wong
- Release date: 24 November 2016
- Running time: 99 minutes
- Countries: Hong Kong; Malaysia
- Language: Cantonese
- Box office: US$140,616

Show Me Your Love (Chinese: 大手牽小手) is a 2016 Hong Kong drama film directed by Ryon Lee and starring Nina Paw and Raymond Wong.

== Plot ==
While planning to move to Guangzhou with his wife, Hong Kong teacher Nin (Raymond Wong) is forced to return to his childhood home in Malaysia after the death of his aunt. Upon returning he is reunited with his mother Sze-nga (Nina Paw) whom he left behind after going to university in Hong Kong.

== Cast ==
- Raymond Wong as Nin, a successful teacher
- Ivana Wong as Sau-lan, Nin's wife
- Nina Paw as Sze-nga, Nin's estranged mother
- Michelle Wai
- Li Fung
- Chan On-ying
- Steve Yap

== See also ==
- Sundown syndrome

== Awards and nominations ==
Award ceremony	Category	Recipients	Result
36th Hong Kong Film Awards	Best Actress	Nina Paw	Nominated
