= Qiao Zhenyu =

Chinese actor (born 1978)

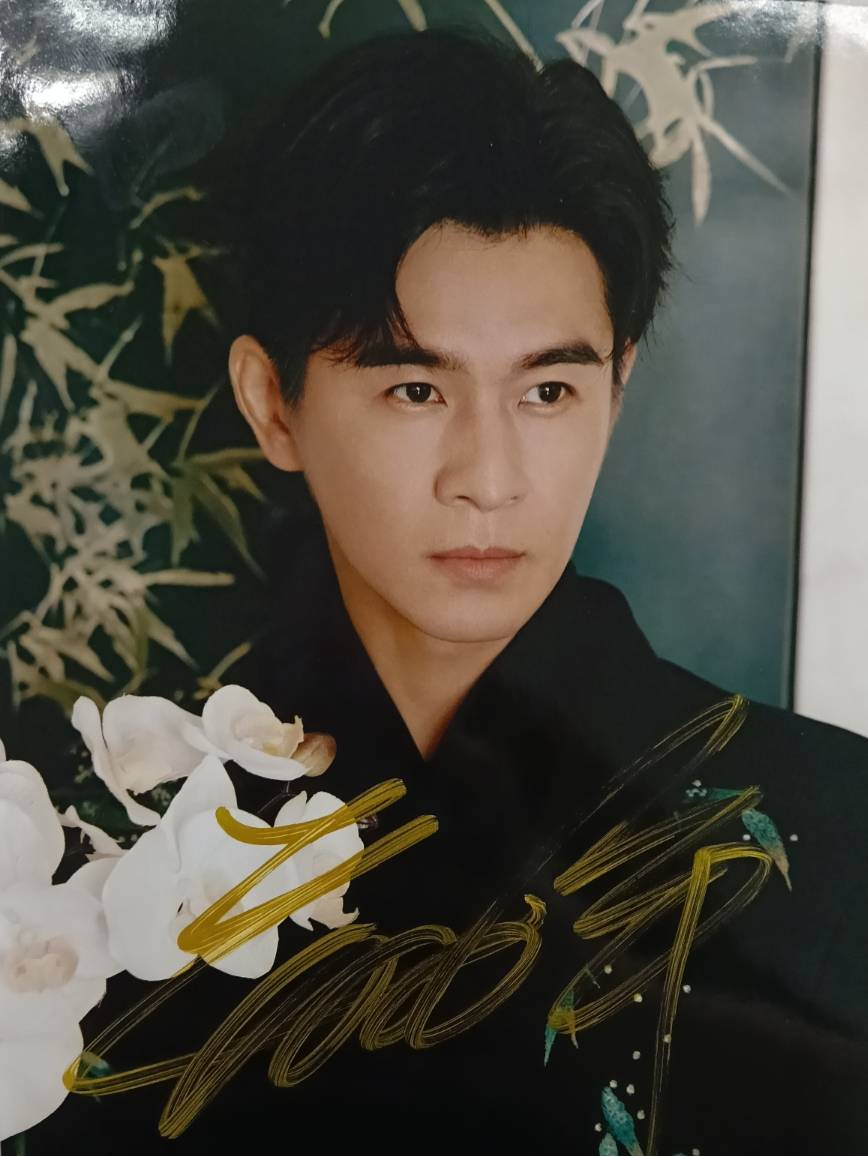
- Qiao in 2025
- Born: 1 November 1978 (age 47); Guilin, Guangxi, China
- Education: Beijing Film Academy
- Occupation: Actor
- Years active: 2000–present
- Agent: Huayi Brothers
- Spouse: Wang Qianyi
- Children: 1
- Awards: Shanghai Television Festival – Most Popular Actor (2014)

Chinese name
- Traditional Chinese: 喬振宇
- Simplified Chinese: 乔振宇
Transcriptions
Standard Mandarin
- Hanyu Pinyin: Qiáo Zhènyǔ
Yue: Cantonese
- Jyutping: Kiu4 Zan3-jyu5
- Website: qzygw.com

Qiao Zhenyu (simplified Chinese: 乔振宇; traditional Chinese: 喬振宇; pinyin: Qiáo Zhènyǔ, born 1 November 1978) is a Chinese actor who is a graduate of the Beijing Dance Academy.

== Career ==
In 2000, Qiao made his debut in the film Soaring Dragon Leaping Tiger. The same year, he filmed his first television drama Xin Nü Fu Ma.

In 2006, he starred in several hit dramas namely Princess Shengping, Love of Fate and Fast Track Love, which won him recognition. He received the Best New Actor award at the TVS Award Ceremony.

In 2007, he starred in The Spirit of the Sword, based on the novel of the same name by Gu Long. The drama was a ratings hit and propelled Qiao to fame in China. He also starred in several well received historical dramas like Seven Swords (2006) and The Book and the Sword (2008).

In 2013, he starred in the critically acclaimed family drama To Elderly with Love. The same year, he starred in the critically acclaimed historical drama Heroes of Sui and Tang Dynasties, as well as period drama Beauties at the Crossfire. He received recognition for his acting performance, and won the Most Popular Actor award at the Shanghai Television Festival.

In 2014, he starred in the hit fantasy action drama Swords of Legends and received popularity for his portrayal of the anti-hero, Ouyang Shaogong.

In 2017, he starred in the historical drama Song of Phoenix, portraying King Huai of Chu. He received the Outstanding Performance award at the inaugural Gold Hibiscus Awards.

In 2019, Qiao starred in the mystery web drama Mystery of Antiques.

In 2019, Qiao starred in the historical drama Empress of the Ming.

== Filmography ==
=== Film ===
Year	English title	Chinese title	Role	Notes	Ref.
2000	Soaring Dragon Leaping Tiger	龙腾虎跃	Qiao Zhenyu		
2005	In Love with Trouble	爱上麻烦	Cheng Mingzhi		
2006	Stand in Love	不完全恋人	Li Xiang	Cameo	
2007	Forever Fireworks	烟花恋人	Yongjian		
2009	The King of Waist Drum	鼓王	Tan Gaohu		
2010	Confucius	孔子	Kong Li		
2010		山生	Zhao Yahui	Cameo	
2010	Love In Disguise	恋爱通告	Mu Fan		
2012	Desperate Speech	亡命演说	Su Shaoyang/Zhang Shuhen	Television film	
2012	Back to 1942	一九四二	Secretary Han		
2014	To Love Somebody	求爱嫁期	Huang Zihong		
2015	The Spirit of the Swords	情劍	Fang Baoyu	cut version of the series The Spirit of the Sword (2007)	
2015	Bad Guys Always Die	坏蛋必须死	San'er		
2019	The Big Shot	大人物			
2019	S.W.A.T.	特警队	Guo Zhigang		

=== Television series ===
Year	English title	Chinese title	Role	Notes/Ref.
2000		新女驸马	Dongfang Sheng	
2001		海洋馆的约会	Sun Ming	
2001		美丽校园	Jiawei	
2001		行行出状元	Xu Sanyuan	
2002	Field of Dreams	壮志雄心	Shao Qi	
2002		新五女拜寿	Yun Tianhao	
2003	The Story of a Noble Family	金粉世家	Li Haoran	
2003		雪花女神龙	Ouyang Mingri	
2003		爱我你怕了吗	Liu Dongzi	
2003		巴士警探	Lei Tian	
2004	A Chance of Sunshine	向左走向右走	Shi Shangyi	
2004	Princess Wuyou	无忧公主	Chang Meng	
2004		站在你背后	Li Chengkang	
2006	Princess Shengping	新醉打金枝	Qin Feng/Qian Yun	
2006	Love of Fate	青城之恋	Zhao Yutong	
2006	Fast Track Love	车神	Liu Yunsong	
2006	Seven Swordsmen	七剑下天山	Mulang	
2007	Love in Future	爱在来时	Chen Xiangyu	
2007	The Spirit of the Sword	浣花洗剑录	Fang Baoyu	
2007		心灵的泪花	Wang Weijun	
2008	Royal Tramp	鹿鼎记	Zheng Keshuang	
2008		丑女也疯狂	Feng Zijian	
2008	Ji Xiaolan, The Young Litigator	少年讼师纪晓岚	Yang Naiwen	
2008	Memories of the Golden Flame	烽火影人	Liu Ziping	
2009	Four Women Conflict	锁清秋	Su Xinhai	
2009		超人马大姐	Zhao Yi	Cameo
2009		安逗与黑仔		Cameo
2009	The Book and the Sword	书剑恩仇录	Chen Jialuo / Fuk'anggan	
2010	Chinese Style Dating	中国式相亲	Su Ge	
2011	The Hidden Intention	被遗弃的秘密	Ou Guanqun	
2011		满秋	Guo Naiwen	
2012	Cherry Color	血色樱花	Gao Wenxuan	
2012	Heroes of Sui and Tang Dynasties	隋唐英雄	Li Jiancheng	
2013	Can Not Live Without Family	不能没有家	Huo Lei	
2013	Painted Skin II	画皮之真爱无悔	Zheng Ji	
2013	To Elderly with Love	老有所依	Yu Miao	
2013		大盛魁	Zhang Jie	
2013	Beauties at the Crossfire	烽火佳人	Zhou Tingchen	
2014	The Story of a Woodcutter and his Fox Wife	刘海砍樵	Liu Hai	
2014	Swords of Legends	古剑奇谭	Ouyang Shaogong	
2014	The Young Doctor	青年医生	Gu Xiaomeng	Cameo
2015	City of Angels	天使之城	Yang Chaoqun	
2015		金玉瑶之一诺千金	Liu Sixiao	Cameo
2015	Ghost Stories 4	聊斋新编	Tao Yueming	
2015	Hua Xu Yin: City of Desperate Love	华胥引之绝爱之城	Young Suheng	
2016		浴血重生	Tan Zhengang	
2016	War and Peace	大世界	Qin Xiaotian	
2016	The Epiphyllum Dream	昙花梦	Cheng Cihang	
2016	Perfect Wedding	大嫁风尚	Jin Zhihao	
2017	Psychologist	双面心理师	Xia Mu	
2017	Song of Phoenix	思美人	King Huai of Chu	
2018	Hero's Dream	天意之秦天宝鉴	Qin Shihuang	Special appearance
2018	Mystery of Antiques	古董局中局	Yao Buran	
2019	Empress of the Ming	大明风华	Xu Bin	
2019	The Best Partner	精英律师		Cameo
2020	Reunion: The Sound of the Providence	重启之极海听雷	Xie Yuchen	
TBA	Wicked City	裸漂	Wang Yu	
TBA	The Entangled Life of Qingluo	蔓蔓青萝	Liu Fei (Zi Li)	
TBA	Healing Love	幸福的理由	Xu Dongan	
TBA	Great Age	大时代	Hong Yuqiao	
TBA	Thank You Doctor	谢谢你医生		
TBA	A Love Never Lost	人生若如初见		
TBA	Yi Pian Bing Xin Zai Yu Hu	一片冰心在玉壶	Xiao Chen	
TBA	Cracking Case	拆·案	Lu Shijun	
TBA	Silk Road Treasure	昆仑·丝路宝藏		
TBA	Blood River	暗河传	Su Zhe	
