= To Love or Not =

- Chinese: 一夜未了情
- Hanyu Pinyin: Yíyè Wèiliǎo Qíng
- Directed by: Jiang Cheng
- Written by: Jiang Cheng; Jin Haishu
- Produced by: Wang Chuan
- Starring: Alex Fong; Li Xiaoran; Kathy Chow; Li Yuan; Song Xiaoying
- Cinematography: Li Yixu
- Edited by: Yu Xi
- Music by: Henry Lai Wan-man; Ding Jiandong; Gao Chun
- Production companies: Asia Pacific Huaying (Beijing) Film Co., Ltd. Beijing Lida Yongxin Electronic Co., Ltd.
- Distributed by: Beijing Longbiao Film Distribution Co., Ltd. Dadi Times Film Distribution (Beijing) Co., Ltd.
- Release date: 15 July 2011 (China)
- Running time: 100 minutes
- Country: China
- Language: Mandarin

To Love or Not (Chinese: 一夜未了情) is a 2011 Chinese romance film written and directed by Jiang Cheng and starring Alex Fong, Li Xiaoran, Kathy Chow, Li Yuan, and Song Xiaoying. The film tells the story of a war correspondent and photographer Su Dong and a stewardess Gu Ting who meet on a journey in Yunnan province, they separated after a night of romantic passion, and then meet again in Beijing. The film premiered in China on July 15, 2011.

== Cast ==
- Alex Fong as Su Dong, a war correspondent and photographer in Afghanistan. He is shot dead by an Afghan child named Ahsuka.
- Li Xiaoran as Gu Ting, a stewardess. She met Su Dong and has a one night stand while traveling in Yunnan province.
- Kathy Chow as Song Mei, an editor, Gu Ting's best friend.
- Li Yuan as Sha Sha, Su Dong's girlfriend. She breaks up with Su Dong angrily because he falls in love with Gu Ting.
- Song Xiaoying as Gu Ting's mother. She got divorced when her daughter Gu Ting was 8 years old.
- Ding Yongdai as Dan Yang
- Qiao Hong as Dan Yang's wife.

== Production ==
This film was shot in Yunnan and Beijing.

== Release ==
The film was released on July 15, 2011 in China.

== Reception ==
Douban, a major Chinese media rating site, gave the drama 5.1 out of 10.
