= High Flying Songs of Tang Dynasty =

- VCD cover art
- Also known as: Da Tang Ge Fei
- Traditional Chinese: 大唐歌飛 / 大唐歌妃
- Simplified Chinese: 大唐歌飞 / 大唐歌妃
- Hanyu Pinyin: Dà Táng Gē Fēi
- Genre: Historical fiction, costume drama, romance
- Screenplay by: Qiu Hengcong; Li Yonghao; Wang Chen; Qiu Shuqin
- Directed by: Chen Jie; Bai Gang; Du Li
- Presented by: Tan Xiangjiang
- Starring: Ma Su; Jia Nailiang; Tang Guoqiang; Sun Haiying; Lü Liping; Wang Luyao; Nie Yuan; Miao Yiyi; Wang Xiaoying
- Theme music composer: Jin Shan; Li Junhua
- Opening theme: Hongyan Lei (红颜泪) performed by Fei Yu-ching
- Ending theme: Da Tang Ge Fei (大唐歌飞) performed by Wang Luyao
- Country of origin: China
- Original language: Mandarin
- No. of episodes: 36

Production
- Executive producers: Wang Guohui; Huang Yeming; Yu Weijun; Hao Lin
- Producers: Tan Xiangyun; Bai Gang; Li Changjiang; Li Mangye; Xu Hongtao
- Production locations: Wuxi, Jiangsu, China
- Running time: 45 minutes per episode
- Production companies: CCTV; Jiangxi TV; China Television Media; Beijing Yasheng Culture Broadcasting; Tongle Media Investment

Original release
- Network: CCTV-8
- Release: 20 September 2003

High Flying Songs of Tang Dynasty, also known as Da Tang Ge Fei, is a Chinese television series based on the romance between the Tang dynasty singer-dancer Xu Hezi (许合子) and her lover Yin Menghe (尹梦荷), as well as a fictitious account of their involvement in the events in the reign of Emperor Xuanzong. Starring Ma Su and Jia Nailiang as the couple, the series was first aired on CCTV-8 in mainland China on 20 September 2003.

== Plot ==
Xu Hezi, a talented singer-dancer from Yongxin, Jiangxi, is in love with her childhood friend, the scholar Yin Menghe. However, she is forcefully taken away by the local authorities and sent to the palace in Chang'an. Not long after joining the imperial harem, she becomes embroiled in a power struggle between Consort Mei and Imperial Consort Yang. She wishes to leave the palace for good, but fate leads her to Emperor Xuanzong, who is so enchanted by her singing that he grants her the title of "Singing Consort".

In the meantime, Yin Menghe and his younger brother, Yin Mengyun, have followed Xu Hezi to Chang'an but they cannot enter the palace. To reunite with his beloved, Yin Menghe has no choice but to cooperate with the crafty chancellor Yang Guozhong. Xu Hezi and Yin Menghe encounter several tests of their love but they always remain faithful to each other. They managed to touch the hearts of many, including the poet Li Bai, A'feng and Princess Mudan.

The crown prince, Li Heng, appears to be meek and humble but is actually a highly ambitious individual. He makes use of Xu Hezi to threaten Yin Menghe and force him to work with the general An Lushan. When An Lushan starts a rebellion against the Tang dynasty, Emperor Xuanzong flees from Chang'an and Li Heng seizes the opportunity to take his father's throne. After becoming the emperor, Li Heng intends to kill Yin Menghe in order to silence the latter but Yin Mengyun sacrifices himself to save his brother and ensure that his brother can be together with Xu Hezi.

== Cast ==
- Ma Su as Xu Hezi
- Jia Nailiang as Yin Menghe
- Tang Guoqiang as Emperor Xuanzong of Tang
- Sun Haiying as Li Bai
- Lü Liping as Consort Mei
- Wang Luyao as Imperial Consort Yang
- Nie Yuan as An Qingxu
- Miao Yiyi as Shucai
- Wang Xiaoying as Gao Lishi
- Zhao Kai as Li Heng
- Wang Yu as Yang Guozhong
- Zhao Minjie as He Zhizhang
- Chi Jia as Yin Mengyun
- Bao Depan as An Lushan
- Xu Zhen as Wei Qing
- Liu Xiaoxiao as Hu Lai
- Wu Jiaojiao as Xiaoyu
- Liu Yuanyuan as Princess Mudan
- Liu Jing as A'feng
- Hua Dong as Jiu Popo
- Jia Mingling as Yincishi
- Mu Jing as Moju
- Xiao Wen as Ruyi
- Xiaosi as A'bing

== List of featured songs ==
- Hongyan Lei (红颜泪; Beauties' Tears), the opening theme song, performed by Fei Yu-ching.
- Da Tang Ge Fei (大唐歌飞; High Flying Songs of Tang Dynasty), the ending theme song, performed by Wang Luyao.
- Da Zhi Shan Ge (打支山歌; Sing a Song of Mountains) performed by Jin Shan, Liu Xiang, Zhang Ai and Pan Huili.
- Yi Zhen Chunfeng / Wang Lang Diao (一阵春风 / 望郎调; / A Gust of Spring Wind / Tune of Gazing at My Lover) performed by Jin Shan, Liu Xiang, Zhang Ai and Pan Huili.
- Yao Chang Shange Suan Wo Duo (要唱山歌算我多; Who Sings More Songs of Mountains Than Me) performed by Jin Shan, Liu Xiang, Zhang Ai and Pan Huili.
- Qingping Diao (清平调; Tune of Serenity) performed by Liu Xiang and Pan Huili.
- Chang'an Yi Pian Yue (长安一片月; Chang'an is Like the Moon) performed by Liu Xiang and Pan Huili.
- Huang Yun Cheng Bian (黄云城边; Beside the City of Yellow Clouds) performed by Liu Xiang and Pan Huili.
- Ziye Wu Ge / Qiu Ge (子夜吴歌 / 秋歌; Midnight Song of Wu / Autumn Song) performed by Liu Xiang and Pan Huili.
