= Baifa Monü Zhuan =

1957 wuxia novel by Liang Yusheng

- Author: Liang Yusheng
- Original title: 白髮魔女傳
- Language: Chinese
- Genre: Wuxia
- Set in: 17th-century China
- Publisher: New Evening Post
- Publication date: 5 August 1957 – 8 September 1958
- Publication place: Hong Kong
- Media type: Print
- ISBN: 9789860723885
- Preceded by: Guangling Jian
- Followed by: Saiwai Qixia Zhuan

Baifa Monü Zhuan
- Traditional Chinese: 白髮魔女傳
- Simplified Chinese: 白发魔女传
- Literal meaning: Story of the White-Haired Demoness
Transcriptions
Standard Mandarin
- Hanyu Pinyin: Bái Fà Mó Nǚ Zhuàn
Yue: Cantonese
- Jyutping: Baak^{6} Faat^{3} Mo^{1} Neoi^{5} Zyun^{6}

Baifa Monü Zhuan (白髮魔女傳), literally Story of the White-Haired Demoness and variously translated as Biography of the White-Haired Succuba and Romance of the White-Haired Maiden, is a wuxia novel by Liang Yusheng. It was first published as a serial from 5 August 1957 to 8 September 1958 in the Hong Kong newspaper New Evening Post. Set in 17th-century China during the Ming dynasty, the novel follows the doomed romance between Lian Nichang, a fiercely independent vigilante swordswoman, and Zhuo Yihang, a Wudang Sect swordsman, against a backdrop of political decay and moral conflict. It marks the transition from Liang Yusheng's Pingzong series to the Tianshan series, serving as the latter's first instalment and a prequel to Saiwai Qixia Zhuan.

One of Liang Yusheng's best-known novels, Baifa Monü Zhuan is credited for its influence on the "new school" of wuxia fiction that emerged in Hong Kong in the mid-1950s. Critics have praised its blend of romantic tragedy, psychological depth and historical realism, as well as its portrayal of Lian Nichang as one of the genre's earliest complex female protagonists. Its lyrical prose and moral ambiguity helped shape the modern "cultured swordsman" archetype and influenced other wuxia writers, including Jin Yong. Baifa Monü Zhuan has also been adapted into films and television series, most notably the 1993 Hong Kong film The Bride with White Hair.

== Publication history ==
Baifa Monü Zhuan was first published as a serial from 5 August 1957 to 8 September 1958 in the Hong Kong newspaper New Evening Post. Subsequent reprints include a 1984 two-volume edition by Inner Mongolia Cultural Press, 1985 and 1996 editions by Guangdong Travel and Tourism Press, 1992 and 2000 two-volume editions by Cosmos Books, and 2012, 2014 and 2021 two-volume editions by the Sun Yat-Sen University Press.

== Plot summary ==
The story is set in 17th-century China when the Ming dynasty is on the brink of collapse due to political corruption.

Lian Nichang, a vigilante swordswoman, leads a band of outlaws who punishes the corrupt and defends the oppressed. Her notoriety makes her feared across the wulin. Zhuo Yihang, a swordsman of the Wudang Sect, encounters and falls in love with Lian Nichang, unaware of her real identity. After realising the truth, he stands by her, and the two develop a deep yet troubled romance.

The couple's lives intersect with Yue Mingke, a swordsman serving under the Ming general Xiong Tingbi. Together, they resist the corrupt eunuch Wei Zhongxian, who holds sway over the Ming government. At one point, Yue Mingke is disillusioned after his lover, Tie Shanhu, is killed by Wei Zhongxian's henchmen during the power struggle, so he becomes a Buddhist monk and retires to lead a reclusive life at Mount Heaven.

Zhuo Yihang's devotion to Lian Nichang is tested when the Wudang Sect elders denounce her past and forbid their union. During a confrontation, Zhuo Yihang accidentally wounds Lian Nichang, leading her to believe he has betrayed her. Overcome with grief, Lian Nichang retreats to Mount Heaven, where her hair turns white overnight — a physical manifestation of her despair.

Over the years, Lian Nichang becomes known as the "White-Haired Demoness", living in solitude in Mount Heaven while maintaining her fierce sense of justice. Zhuo Yihang, consumed by remorse, leaves the Wudang Sect and finds Lian Nichang to reconcile with her but she refuses. Hoping for redemption, he discovers a rare flower said to restore her hair's colour, and waits in silence for it to bloom once every six decades.

== Principal characters ==
- Lian Nichang (練霓裳) – Ling Yunfeng's apprentice, a vigilante swordswoman and outlaw leader. Fiercely independent and morally-driven, she upholds justice in the wulin. Her tragic romance with Zhuo Yihang and subsequent transformation into the "White-Haired Demoness" form the novel's emotional core.
- Zhuo Yihang (卓一航) – a swordsman of the Wudang Sect, portrayed as idealistic yet indecisive. Torn between love and duty, he fails to defend Lian Nichang against sectarian prejudice, leading to her disillusionment and transformation.
- Yue Mingke (岳鳴珂) – Huo Tiandu's apprentice and a swordsman serving under the Ming general Xiong Tingbi. After Tie Shanhu's death, he renounces worldly affairs, becomes the Buddhist monk Master Huiming (晦明禪師) and later founds the Mount Heaven Sect, linking Baifa Monü Zhuan to the rest of the Tianshan series.
- Tie Shanhu (鐵珊瑚) – Tie Feilong's daughter and Yue Mingke's lover. Her devotion and tragic death illustrate the emotional toll of political and wulin conflicts.
- Tie Feilong (鐵飛龍) – Tie Shanhu's father and a formidable martial artist specialising in palm strikes. He takes Lian Nichang as his goddaughter and supports the heroes in their fight against Wei Zhongxian's henchmen.
- Wei Zhongxian (魏忠賢) – the influential eunuch who dominates the Ming government through manipulation and terror. His downfall mirrors the Ming dynasty's collapse and serves as a backdrop for the protagonists' struggles.

== Reception and legacy ==
Baifa Monü Zhuan is one of Liang Yusheng's best-known and most influential works. Literary reference works note the novel's combination of romantic tragedy, moral complexity, and strong historical setting, crediting Liang Yusheng with developing psychologically rounded protagonists and an elevated, lyrical narrative voice that helped to shape the "cultured swordsman" (文士型侠客) archetype in modern wuxia fiction.

Contemporary and later critics have emphasised the novel's fusion of personal passion and political turmoil. Commentators read the central tragic romance and the heroine's white-haired transformation as literary devices that link private loss with broader social disorder, producing both a potent emotional centre and a moral critique of factionalism and betrayal in imperial Chinese society. Academic surveys also highlight Liang Yusheng's use of classical allusion, poetic prose, and landscape descriptions to deepen the novel's elegiac tone.

The novel's legacy is reflected in its numerous screen and stage adaptations. Film and television versions — most notably the 1993 Hong Kong film The Bride with White Hair and several television series — are central to the novel's cultural profile among Chinese-speaking audiences around the world. Film scholarship and contemporary reviews have treated the adaptations as significant moments in the cross-media circulation of wuxia themes and have debated the fidelity and reinterpretation of Liang Yusheng's romantic and moral concerns on screen.

Reader reception has remained substantial over time. On Douban, one edition published in 1996 earns a score of 7.7/10 from over 4,000 users, while a 2014 illustrated edition records 7.4/10 from dozens of reviews. These ratings reflect appreciation for the novel's tragic romance, moral complexity, and atmospheric descriptions, though some users note episodic pacing and occasional digressions. The 2014 illustrated edition is also described as one of Liang Yusheng's representative works depicting Lian Nichang as an "extraordinary heroine" (奇女子) and her relationship with Zhuo Yihang as a "classic romantic tragedy".

Scholars situate Baifa Monü Zhuan as a significant work in Liang Yusheng's collection of works and in the broader development of the "new school" of wuxia fiction that emerged in Hong Kong in the 1950s. It helped to consolidate a trend that combined historical setting, poetic prose, and psychological inwardness, and it has been repeatedly referenced in critical accounts of the genre's shift towards more reflective, character-centred storytelling. The novel's film and television adaptations have also made it a frequent point of departure for studies of adaptation, performance, and popular memory in Chinese cultural studies.

== Adaptations ==
=== Films ===
| Year | Title | Production | Main cast |
|---|---|---|---|
| 1959 | Story of the White-Haired Demon Girl | Emei Film Company (Hong Kong) | Law Yim-hing, Cheung Ying, Lin Chiao, Law Lan, Shih Kien |
| 1980 | White Hair Devil Lady | Great Wall Movie Enterprises Ltd (Hong Kong) | Paw Hee-ching, Henry Fong, Leanne Liu, Cheung Ping |
| 1993 | The Bride with White Hair | Hong Kong | Brigitte Lin, Leslie Cheung |
| 1993 | The Bride with White Hair 2 | Hong Kong | Brigitte Lin, Leslie Cheung, Christy Chung, Sunny Chan, Joey Meng |
| 2014 | The White Haired Witch of Lunar Kingdom | Bona Film Group (China) | Fan Bingbing, Huang Xiaoming, Vincent Zhao |
| 2020 | The White Haired Witch | iQiyi (China) | Huang Yi, Shi Junzhe, Zhang Chunzhong, Du Yuming |
| 2020 | White Haired Devil Lady | Youku (China) | Zhang Weina, Shi Junzhe, Norman Chui, Zhang Qi |

=== Television ===
| Year | Title | Production | Main cast |
|---|---|---|---|
| 1986 | The Romance of the White Hair Maiden (1986 TV series) | ATV (Hong Kong) | Bonnie Ngai, Savio Tsang, Chen Kuan-tai, Wong Jo-see, Amy Yip |
| 1995 | Romance of the White Haired Maiden (1995 TV series) | TVB (Hong Kong) | Ada Choi, Timmy Ho, Gary Chan, Joanna Chan, Jason Pai |
| 1996 | Legend of the White Hair Brides | TCS (Singapore) | Huang Biren, Lina Ng, Ann Kok, Jason Oh |
| 1999 | Romance of the White Haired Maiden (TV series) | TTV (Taiwan) | Jiang Qinqin, Julian Cheung, Lin Fangbing, Chen Chun-sheng, Zhang Heng, Li Hui-ying |
| 2012 | The Bride with White Hair (TV series) | Phoenix Legend Films (China) | Nicky Wu, Ma Su, Louis Fan, Liu Sitong, Li Jie, Guo Zhenni, Dai Jiaoqian |
