= Qijian Xia Tianshan =

1956 wuxia novel by Liang Yusheng

- Author: Liang Yusheng
- Original title: 七劍下天山
- Language: Chinese
- Genre: Wuxia
- Set in: 17th-century China
- Publisher: Ta Kung Pao
- Publication date: 15 February 1956 – 31 March 1957
- Publication place: Hong Kong
- Media type: Print
- ISBN: 9786263755222
- Preceded by: Saiwai Qixia Zhuan
- Followed by: Jianghu San Nüxia

Qijian Xia Tianshan
- Traditional Chinese: 七劍下天山
- Simplified Chinese: 七剑下天山
- Literal meaning: Seven Swords of Mount Heaven
Transcriptions
Standard Mandarin
- Hanyu Pinyin: Qī Jiàn Xià Tiān Shān
Yue: Cantonese
- Jyutping: Cat^{1} Gim^{3} Haa^{5} Tin^{1} Saan^{1}

Qijian Xia Tianshan (七劍下天山), literally Seven Swords of Mount Heaven, is a wuxia novel by Liang Yusheng. It was first published as a serial in the Hong Kong newspaper Ta Kung Pao under the Xiaoshuolin column from 15 February 1956 to 31 March 1957. The novel is the third instalment in the Tianshan series, preceded by Saiwai Qixia Zhuan and followed by Jianghu San Nüxia. It is part of a trilogy set during the Qing dynasty. The novel has been loosely adapted into film and television, most notably the 2005 film Seven Swords and the 2006 television series Seven Swordsmen.

== Publication history ==
Qijian Xia Tianshan was first published as a serial in the Hong Kong newspaper Ta Kung Pao under the Xiaoshuolin column from 15 February 1956 to 31 March 1957.

Subsequent reprints in book forms include a 1984 edition by Yunnan Nationalities Publishing House, a 1985 three-volume edition by Central Plains Farmers Publishing House, a 1985 six-volume edition by Guangdong People's Publishing House, 1985 and 1996 editions by Guangdong Travel and Tourism Press, 1993 and 1999 two-volume editions by Cosmos Books, and a 2012 two-volume edition (combined with Saiwai Qixia Zhuan) by the Sun Yat-Sen University Press.

== Plot summary ==
The novel is set in 17th-century China during the Qing dynasty and continues the tragic romance of Yang Yuncong and Nalan Minghui. Nalan Minghui has secretly given birth to their daughter, Yilan Zhu, despite being forced to marry the Qing prince Dodo. Before the wedding in Hangzhou, Yang Yuncong shows up and takes away the baby Yilan Zhu, but gets mortally wounded in a fight against Dodo's henchmen. Before dying, Yang Yuncong entrusts his daughter to Ling Weifeng, who takes her to Mount Heaven. There, Ling Weifeng raises and trains Yilan Zhu in swordsmanship while also learning from Master Huiming, who had trained Yang Yuncong.

18 years later, Ling Weifeng returns to the wulin as a formidable swordsman, accompanied by Yilan Zhu, who vows to avenge her father. Yilan Zhu's attempt to assassinate Dodo leads her into an encounter with anti-Qing rebels from the Tiandihui and Southern Ming. She meets Zhang Huazhao, whom she rescues and falls in love with.

Meanwhile, Ling Weifeng reunites with his old flame, Liu Yufang, and befriends fellow wulin figures Fu Qingzhu, Mao Huanlian, Gui Zhongming, Wu Qiongyao, and Hamaya. The heroes combine forces to resist the Qing government's oppression. Although Yilan Zhu ultimately kills Dodo, she gets captured, but Ling Weifeng and Hamaya save her.

In the climactic ending, Ling Weifeng is trapped by Yang Yuncong's treacherous junior, Chu Zhaonan, in a labyrinth in Tibet, but is later saved by his companions; Chu Zhaonan commits suicide after his defeat. Ling Weifeng, Yilan Zhu, Zhang Huazhao, Gui Zhongming, Mao Huanlian, Wu Qiongyao, and Hamaya are celebrated as the "Seven Swords of Mount Heaven", remembered for upholding justice in the wulin and helping the oppressed.

== Principal characters ==
- Ling Weifeng (凌未風) – a heroic Mount Heaven Sect swordsman trained by Master Huiming, dedicated to defending the innocent and upholding justice.
- Yilan Zhu (易蘭珠) – Yang Yuncong and Nalan Minghui's daughter who was raised and trained by Ling Weifeng and Master Huiming.
- Mao Huanlian (冒浣蓮) – Mao Bijiang and Dong Xiaowan's daughter who was raised and trained by Fu Qingzhu. A compassionate and intelligent swordswoman, she becomes Gui Zhongming's romantic partner after helping him heal from his past trauma.
- Gui Zhongming (桂仲明) – a swordsman with a tragic past who becomes the founder of the northern branch of the Wudang Sect.
- Wu Qiongyao (武瓊瑤) – Lian Nichang's apprentice who marries Li Zicheng's descendant Li Siyong (李思永).
- Hamaya (哈瑪雅) – Lian Nichang's apprentice and Nalan Minghui's former rival in love. She aids Ling Weifeng in rescuing Yilan Zhu and becomes one of the "Seven Swords".
- Zhang Huazhao (張華昭) – Zhang Huangyan's son and a Southern Ming loyalist who marries Yilan Zhu.
- Chu Zhaonan (楚昭南) – Ling Weifeng's treacherous senior. Consumed by jealousy and ambition, he betrays the Mount Heaven Sect and serves the Qing government.
- Liu Yufang (劉郁芳) – Ling Weifeng's old flame, whose misunderstanding of his past actions leads to years of estrangement. Despite the pain between them, she remains loyal and grieves deeply for him.
- Fu Qingzhu (傅青主) – a highly-skilled swordsman and physician who trained Mao Huanlian, and serves as a mentor figure to the younger generation.
- Han Zhibang (韓志邦) – a loyal and self-sacrificing Tiandihui rebel who harbours unspoken feelings for Liu Yufang.
- Nalan Minghui (納蘭明慧) – Yilan Zhu's mother and Yang Yuncong's lover, forced into marriage with Dodo.
- Dodo (多鐸) – a Qing prince whose conflict with Yang Yuncong's lineage drives the central revenge plot.
- Master Huiming (晦明禪師) – the Mount Heaven Sect's founder whose teachings shape the heroes' moral foundation.

== Reception and legacy ==
Qijian Xia Tianshan is considered a milestone in Liang Yusheng's Tianshan series and an example of the "new school" of wuxia fiction that emerged in Hong Kong in the 1950s which blends historical elements with ethical complexity and romantic depth.

On Douban, the novel is rated 7.5 out of 10, with praise directed to its poetic prose, characters, and moral framing, though some highlight moments when narrative pacing or extensive details on martial arts slow down the story.

Critics and commentators point to the novel's moral and political layers: Liang Yusheng's depiction of the Kangxi Emperor as a patricidal ruler is often interpreted as a symbolic stand against tyrannical authority and an articulation of ethnic or class tensions. The interweaving of multiple romantic and ethical threads — Yang Yuncong and Nalan Minghui, Ling Weifeng and Liu Yufang, and familial/factional conflicts — has been lauded for raising emotional stakes beyond simple heroics. Some critique lies in the balance between technical martial arts descriptions and character nuance.

In scholarly and publishing circles, the novel is analysed as part of Liang Yusheng's collection of works and the serialisation of wuxia novels which started in Hong Kong in the 1950s. Debate persists over the exact chronology and interrelations among the Tianshan novels, influencing interpretations of character continuity and thematic progression.

== Adaptations ==
=== Films ===
In 1959, Hong Kong's Emei Film Company produced a film titled Seven Swordsmen Leave Tianshan based on the novel. It starred Cheung Wood-yau, Law Yim-hing, Lam Kau, Hoh Bik-gin, Shek Sau, Yeung Fan and Yeung Yip-wang.

The 2005 film Seven Swords directed by Tsui Hark is loosely adapted from the novel. Paying homage to Akira Kurosawa's 1954 film Seven Samurai, it follows seven swordsmen, each wielding a special sword, departing from Mount Heaven to save a village under attack by a ruthless warlord. Donnie Yen, Leon Lai, Charlie Yeung, Lu Yi and Sun Honglei starred in the leading roles.

In 2019 and 2020, Tencent and others produced a television film trilogy loosely adapted from the novel and directed by Francis Nam. The three films are titled Seven Swords: The Eye of Shura, Seven Swords: Bone of the Godmaker, and Seven Swords: Seven Love Flowers. The trilogy incorporates xianxia elements and reuses the same seven special swords first introduced in the 2005 film Seven Swords.

=== Television ===
In 2006, Tsui Hark produced Seven Swordsmen, a television series derived from the 2005 film Seven Swords. It starred Vincent Zhao, Wang Xuebing, Ray Lui, Ada Choi, Qiao Zhenyu, Li Xiaoran, Wang Likun and Bryan Leung. The story is based more on Saiwai Qixia Zhuan, the novel preceding Qijian Xia Tianshan, even though it shares the same Chinese title as the latter.

=== Comics ===
In 2006, Chinese artists Guangzu (光祖) and Niu Tongxue (牛同學) released a manhua series of the same Chinese title as the novel, featuring the same seven special swords first introduced in the 2005 film Seven Swords.
