= The Bride with White Hair (TV series) =

2012 Chinese TV series

- 新白发魔女传
- Genre: Wuxia
- Based on: Baifa Monü Zhuan by Liang Yusheng
- Screenplay by: Liang Zhiming; Han Peizhen; Chen Peiyin; Lang Nuolin
- Directed by: Wong Wai-kit; Liang Guoguan; Ma Huagan
- Presented by: Jiang Hao; Nicky Wu
- Starring: Nicky Wu; Ma Su; Louis Fan; Liu Sitong; Li Jie; Guo Zhenni; Ye Zuxin
- Theme music composer: Yan Yidan
- Opening theme: "Lingering Fragrance" (留香) by Nicky Wu
- Ending theme: "Flowing Love" (流恋) by Nicky Wu and Yan Yidan
- Country of origin: China
- Original language: Mandarin
- No. of episodes: 42

Production
- Executive producers: Li Longfei; Zhao Chaoyuan; Hui Feng
- Producers: Liu Xiaofeng; Cai Qingzhu
- Production location: China
- Cinematography: Zhao Shiliang; Huang Boxian
- Editors: Wang Kun; Zheng Yuyang
- Running time: ≈ 45 minutes per episode
- Production companies: Phoenix Legend Films; Beijing Daocaoxiong Film Culture

Original release
- Network: Hunan Satellite TV
- Release: 14 September 2012

The Bride with White Hair (新白发魔女传) is a 2012 Chinese wuxia television series loosely adapted from Liang Yusheng's novel Baifa Monü Zhuan. It was first aired on Hunan Satellite TV on 14 September 2012. Shooting started on 26 April 2012 in Hengdian World Studios, Zhejiang. The series starred Nicky Wu, Ma Su, Louis Fan, Liu Sitong, Li Jie, Guo Zhenni and Ye Zuxin.

== Synopsis ==
The series is set in 17th-century China during the Ming dynasty. A power struggle over the succession takes place between Prince Rui, who is backed by the jinyiwei and Eastern Depot, and the crown prince, who is supported by the Wudang Sect.

To prevent the Wudang Sect from interfering, jinyiwei chief Murong Chong attempts to incite conflict between Wudang and an outlaw band. At the same time, he sends his deputy Yue Mingke to persuade the outlaw leader, who is known as the "Jade Rakshasa", to surrender to the Ming government and help them destroy Wudang. Honghua Guimu, who secretly controls Eastern Depot, also gets involved in sowing discord between the outlaws and Wudang.

The "Jade Rakshasa", whom everyone believes to be the swordswoman Ling Muhua, is actually Ling Muhua's apprentice Lian Nichang, who has been impersonating her master. Lian Nichang, who has fallen into a state of zouhuorumo, will go berserk once a month and indiscriminately slaughter anyone who crosses her path. She only hopes to find her missing master, the only person who can help her recover.

Meanwhile, Lian Nichang meets and falls in love with Zhuo Yihang, a Wudang swordsman groomed to be the sect's next leader. However, their romance faces opposition from the Wudang Sect. Furthermore, Zhuo Yihang's junior He Ehua has a crush on him, and fellow Wudang swordsman Geng Shaonan, who secretly loves He Ehua, feels jealous of Zhuo Yihang and plots to harm him.

== Cast ==
- Nicky Wu as Zhuo Yihang
- Ma Su as Lian Nichang
- Louis Fan as Yue Mingke
- Guo Zhenni as He Ehua
- Li Jie as Geng Shaonan
- Ye Zuxin as Xin Longzi
- Liu Sitong as Tie Shanhu
- Ben Ng as Murong Chong
- Yue Yueli as Tie Feilong / Tie Feihu
- Zhang Tianqi as Wang Zhaoxi
- Zhuo Fan as Jin Duyi
- Lily Tien as Honghua Guimu
- Wei Lai as Bai Min
- Wang Yi as Meng Qiuxia
- Guo Ketong as Tang Jiabi
- Fei Weini as Mo Jiao
- Hou Yu as Gongsun Lei
- Wang Xiuqiang as Ziyang
- Su Mao as Baishi
- Zhang Yeshi as Huangye
- Sun Andong as Shi Hao
- Lin Xiaofeng as Mu Jiuniang
- Zhu Rongrong as Ying Xiuyang
- Ren Xuehai as Wang Jiayin
- Xing Qiqi as Prince Rui
- Yu Zikuan as Tianyang
- Du Yuming as Jin Qianyan
- Michelle Yim as Ling Muhua
  - Ji Xue as Ling Muhua (younger)
- Dai Jiaoqian as Huo Caidie
- Huo Zhengyan as Huo Tiandu
