= Cheung Ying =

Hong Kong actor, writer and director

- Born: January 25, 1919; Fujian, Republic of China
- Died: December 14, 1984 (aged 65); Toronto, Canada
- Occupations: Actor, writer and Director

Cheung Ying (Chinese: 張瑛; January 25, 1919 – December 14, 1984) was a Cantonese actor, writer and director from Hong Kong. He was born to a Fujian family. His father brought him to Hong Kong when he was young. His father was a founder of Fok Hing Chu Choi Hang (福興築材行) in Nam Pak Hong. Some of his siblings studied abroad in Italy and Japan. Cheung Ying could not go to Japan for his further study as his mom became sick after he graduated from Wah Yan College.

== Career ==
In the 1930s, Cheung joined different theater troupes like Times Theater Company (Shi Dai ju tuan) and China Travel Theater Company(Zhong Lv ju tuan). Su Yi appreciated his acting and introduced him to Chuk Ching Yin and Sit Kok Sin. He then joined Nan Yue Movie Company in the late 1930s. Cheung appeared in the movie Roar of the People, which starred Walter Tso Tat-wah. He also appeared in Back to the Motherland! (1937), which starred director and father of Fung Hak-on, Fung Bo Bo and Feng Feng.

== Selective filmography ==
- 1937 The Glowing Pearl
- 1941 Roar of the People - workers' leader.
- 1952 Red Rose, the Songstress (aka Songstress Red Rose)
- 1953 The Guiding Light
- 1953 In the Face of Demolition
- 1953 Family (aka The Family - The "Torrents" Trilogy 《激流三部曲》 by Ba Jin)
- 1955 Honeymoon
- 1957 The Thunderstorm
- 1957 Romance of Jade Hall (Part 1)
- 1958 Romance of Jade Hall (Part 2)
- 1959 Money
- 1959 Story of the White-Haired Demon Girl (Part 1)
- 1959 Story of the White-Haired Demon Girl (Part 2)
- 1960 The Book and the Sword (Part 1)
- 1960 The Book and the Sword (Part 2)
- 1961 House of Kam Topples (Part 1)
- 1961 House of Kam Topples (Part 2)
- 1961 Many Aspects of Love
- 1963 Story of the Sword and the Sabre (Part 1)
- 1963 Story of the Sword and the Sabre (Part 2)
- 1975 The Empress Dowager

== Awards ==
- Star. Avenue of Stars. Tsim Sha Tsui waterfront in Hong Kong.

== Personal life ==
Cheung had five wives, among whom was actress Kong Duen-yee. They produced one daughter. A son, Sammy Cheung, also known as (aka) Cheung Wai, was born in 1962 to Cheung and his fourth wife, also a former film actress.

Cheung died on December 14, 1984, in Canada at age 65.
