= Story of the White-Haired Demon Girl =

1959 Hong Kong film by Lee Fa

- 白髮魔女傳
- Directed by: Lee Fa
- Screenplay by: Chun Hung; Leung Fung
- Based on: Baifa Monü Zhuan by Liang Yusheng
- Starring: Law Yim-hing; Cheung Ying
- Production company: Emei Film Company
- Release dates: 18 March 1959 (Part 1); 22 April 1959 (Part 2); 16 December 1959 (Part 3)
- Country: Hong Kong
- Language: Cantonese

Story of the White-Haired Demon Girl (白髮魔女傳) is a three-part 1959 Hong Kong wuxia film adapted from the novel Baifa Monü Zhuan by Liang Yusheng. The film was directed by Lee Fa and starred Law Yim-hing and Cheung Ying.

== Cast ==
- Law Yim-hing as Lian Nichang
- Cheung Ying as Zhuo Yihang
- Lin Chiao
- Szema Wah Lung
- Wong Chor-san
- Lee Yuet-ching
- Shih Kien
- Siu Hon-sang
- Lee Heung-kam
- Law Lan
- Lau Kar-leung
- Tang Chia
