= Ma Su (actress) =

Chinese actress

- Born: 17 February 1981 (age 45); Harbin, Heilongjiang, China
- Education: Beijing Film Academy
- Occupation: Actress
- Years active: 2003–present
- Agent: Fundamental Films

Chinese name
- Traditional Chinese: 馬蘇
- Simplified Chinese: 马苏
Transcriptions
Standard Mandarin
- Hanyu Pinyin: Mǎ Sū

Ma Su (Chinese: 马苏, born 17 February 1981) is a Chinese actress.

Ma ranked 46th on Forbes China Celebrity 100 list in 2013, 76th in 2014, and 84th in 2015.

== Life and career ==
Ma's name is a combination of her parents' surnames — Ma (her father's) and Su (her mother's).

Ma graduated from the People's Liberation Army Arts College in 1998, majoring in dance. She worked as a model for some television commercials after her graduation. In 2002, she made her acting debut in High Flying Songs of Tang Dynasty, a historical television series set in the Tang dynasty. A year later, she graduated from the Beijing Film Academy.

Ma first rose to fame for her role as the repressed and rebellious young lady in the youth drama Spring in Summer (2003).

In 2009, Ma gained acclaim for her performance in the romantic period drama North Wind Blows. She won the Best Prospect award at the Shanghai Television Festival. Ma then starred in modern romance series My Beautiful Life (2010); her role as the "little nanny" was loved by the audience and established her acting recognition among the masses. She achieved further acclaim with her portrayal of a female bandit in war drama Highest Amnesty, and was also nominated for the Best Supporting Actress award at the Hundred Flowers Awards for her performance in Iron Man, a film about those who struggled to develop China's oil industry in the Taklamakan desert in West China.

Ma then played the titular protagonist in the period drama Beauty of Innocence (2011); her interpretation of the beautiful and strong-willed character won over many critics, and Ma won the Audience's Choice for Actress at the Golden Eagle Awards. She then starred in her first spy drama, Cheongsam (2011) wherein she played a special agent. Her performance in the series won her the Best Actress award at the Huading Awards.

2012 was Ma's most successful year yet. She starred in Beijing Youth, the third installment of Zhao Baogang's Youth trilogy; which won her the Best Actress award at the Huading Awards. She next starred in wuxia drama The Bride with White Hair, and received acclaim for her portrayal of Lian Nishang. The same year, Ma was named the Flying Apsaras Award for Outstanding Actress for her performance in both Beijing Youth and Beauty of Innocence; becoming the first Chinese actress born after the 1980s to nab a win at both the Flying Apsaras Awards and Golden Eagle Awards. Due to her successful performance in various television series, Ma was named the "Television Figure of the Year" at the China TV Drama Awards.

In 2014, Ma co-starred in the comedy film Breakup Buddies; her breakthrough performance as a loud-mouth and couth prostitute earned positive reviews and she won the Best Supporting Actress awards at the Chinese American Film Festival and China Film Festival London. Ma also guest-starred in the historical drama The Legend of Mi Yue (2015), wherein she played her first antagonist role.

== Filmography ==
=== Film ===
Year	English title	Chinese title	Role	Notes	Ref.
2005	A Foreign Luck	天上掉馅饼	Bao'er		
2005		群英会	Qinglian		
2005		东江特遣队	Lin Yazhen		
2006		但愿人长久	Han Wei		
2007	Blessed Destiny	缘来是爱	Yang Fang		
2009	Iron Man	铁人	Wu Xiameng		
2010	Legend of the Fist: The Return of Chen Zhen	精武风云－陈真	General Zhuo's wife		
2010	Wind Blast	西风烈		Cameo	
2012	Ashita ni kakeru ai	通往明日之爱	Zhu Jiang		
2014	Breakup Buddies	心花路放	Sha Sha		
2015	You Are My Sunshine	何以笙箫默	Ms. Wen	Guest appearance	
2016	Suddenly Seventeen	28岁未成年	Bai Xiaoning		
2016	See You Tomorrow	摆渡人	Ah Sao		
2018	The Faces of My Gene	祖宗十九代	Li Li		
2018	Air Strike	大轟炸	Ding Lian		
2019	Lost in Love	如影随心	Liu Juan		
2019	For Love with You	一切如你			
2019	Song of Youth	老师·好		Cameo	
TBA	Battle of Golden Triangle	激战金三角			

=== Television series ===
Year	English title	Chinese title	Role	Notes/Ref.
2003	High Flying Songs of Tang Dynasty	大唐歌飞	Xu Hezi	
2004		丝路豪侠	Manao	
2004	Love in a Miracle	爱在有情天	Sun Xiudong	
2004	Spring in Summer	夏日里的春天	Li Chuntian	
2004	My Kung Fu Girlfriend	我的功夫女友	Yao Kaixin	
2004	The River, The Street	后海前街	Huang Lei	
2005	The Great Adventure	大冒险家	Yau Yin	
2006	King Qian in Wuyue	吴越钱王	Zhen Zhufeng	
2006	Red Ink Fang	红墨坊	Wu Mei	
2006	Shoot Again	睁开你的眼睛	Qi Xiaoxuan	
2007	Sword Stained with Royal Blood	碧血剑	An Xiaohui	
2007	Wudang 2	武当II	Princess Zhu Wan	
2008	Morality Baseline	道德底线	Chen Xiu	
2008		善良背后	Lan Xin	
2009	The North Wind Blows	北风那个吹	Liu Qing	
2009		瑞莲	Rui Lian	
2009	War of Custody	夺子战争	Chen Xiu	
2010	Wu Cheng'en and Journey to the West	吴承恩与西游记	Niu Yufeng	
2010	My Beautiful Life	我的美丽人生	Wang Xiaozao	
2010		婚姻诊断	Wang Haiqing	
2010	Highest Amnesty	大西南剿匪记	Zheng Yaomei	
2011	Melody of Youth	青春旋律	Dong Qianqian	
2011	Beauty of Innocence	女人如花	Bai Yuping	
2011	Cheongsam	旗袍	Guan Pinglu	
2011		军旗飘扬	Yang Wuyue	
2012		欢乐元帅	Chang'e	
2012	AA Lifestyle	AA制生活	Cai Juan	
2012	Young Couple Times	小夫妻时代	Dai Keke	
2012	Beijing Youth	北京青年	Quan Zheng	
2012	The Bride with White Hair	新白发魔女传	Lian Nishang	
2012		中国骑兵	Luo Juanzi	
2012	The Bachelor	大男当婚	Cai Weilan	
2013		烈焰	Song Yu	
2013	Hi 30 years old!	30岁,你好	Luo Hua'er	
2013	Longmen Express	龙门镖局	Qiu Luo	Cameo
2013	Angel is Coming	今夜天使降临	Tian Tian	
2013		风雷动	Hua Mei	Special appearance
2014	0.5 Diors	屌丝日记	Xiao Kui	Cameo
2014	Accoucheur	产科男医生	Zhao Shanshan	Special appearance
2014	Trial Marriage	结婚前规则	Jiang Chu'er	
2014	Cosmetology High	美人制造	Lady Yang	Special appearance
2014	The Young Doctor	青年医生	Qin Lu	Special appearance
2014	Reunion Dinner	团圆饭	Bai Lijuan	
2015	City of Angels	天使的城	Chen Shuang	
2015	Scholar Encountered Soldiers	春江英雄之秀才遇到兵	Wan Shanjiang	
2015	The Legend of Mi Yue	芈月传	Wei Yan	Guest appearance
2016	We Are Still Married	还是夫妻	Lin Xiao	
2017	Midnight Diner	深夜食堂	Customer	Special appearance
2018	The Brothers in Blood	浴血三兄弟	Xiao Jinzi	
2019	Guns and Roses	黄金大劫案	Xin Wan	
2020	Green Water and Green Hills With a Smile	绿水青山带笑颜	Zheng Fei	
2020	Winter Begonia	鬓边不是海棠红		
2020	Qing Feng Ming Yue Jia Ren	清风明月佳人	Li Shishi	
TBA	The Legend of Ba Qing	巴清传	Ba Hongxiang	
TBA	Shanghai Picked Flowers	十里洋场拾年花	Cheng Yumei	
TBA	Swan Dive for Love	北上广的四季沐歌	Zuo Xinran	
TBA	He Xian Gu - Journey to Immortal	修仙记之何仙姑传	Ling Xi	Special appearance
TBA	Two Conjectures About Marriage	婚姻的两种猜想	Xiao Qi	

== Awards and nominations ==
Year	Award	Category	Nominated work	Result	Ref.
2009	Shanghai Television Festival	Most Promising Actress	The North Wind Blows	Won	
2010	Chunyan Awards	Best Supporting Actress	The North Wind Blows	Won	
2010	Hundred Flowers Award	Best Supporting Actress	Iron Man	Nominated	
2011	Huading Awards	Best Actress (Revolution-Era Drama)	Cheongsam	Won	
2012	Golden Eagle Awards	Audience's Choice for Actress	Beauty of Innocence	Won	
2012	Huading Awards	Best Actress (Youth Drama)	Beijing Youth	Won	
2013	Flying Apsaras Awards	Outstanding Actress	Beauty of Innocence, Beijing Youth	Won	
2014	Chinese American Film Festival	Best Supporting Actress	Breakup Buddies	Won	
2014	China International Film Festival London	Best Supporting Actress	Breakup Buddies	Won	
2016	Golden Eagle Awards	Audience's Choice for Actress	The Legend of Mi Yue	Nominated	
2016	3rd The Actors of China Award Ceremony	Best Actress (Emerald)	—N/a	Won	
2017	National Top-Notch Television Production Ceremony	Top 10 Actors	Angel is Coming	Won	
2017	Huading Awards	Best Actress (Contemporary Drama)	We Are Still Married	Won	
2025	Shanghai Television Festival	Best Supporting Actress	We are Criminal Police	Nominated	
