= Romance of the White Haired Maiden (TV series) =

1999 Taiwanese TV series

- DVD cover art
- 白髮魔女
- Genre: Wuxia
- Based on: Baifa Monü Zhuan by Liang Yusheng
- Screenplay by: Chang Hsin-yi; Chen Hsiao-ping
- Directed by: Li Chao-yung; Chang Hsiao-cheng; Lung Kuan-wu
- Starring: Jiang Qinqin; Julian Cheung
- Country of origin: Taiwan
- Original language: Mandarin
- No. of episodes: 44

Production
- Producers: Chi Chen-hsi; Li Pei-sen; Chu Feng-chun; Wang Chin-kui; Hu Ming
- Production location: Taiwan
- Running time: ≈ 45 minutes per episode

Original release
- Network: TTV
- Release: 1999

Romance of the White Haired Maiden (白髮魔女) is a 1999 Taiwanese wuxia television series adapted from the novel Baifa Monü Zhuan by Liang Yusheng. Alternative Chinese titles for the series include Yidai Xianü (一代俠女) and Baifa Xianü (白髮俠女).

== Synopsis ==
The series is set in 17th-century China during the Ming dynasty. Zhuo Yihang of the Wudang Sect falls in love with the outlaw leader Lian Nichang, disregarding her history of bad blood with Wudang.

The treacherous eunuch Wei Zhongxian murders the Taichang Emperor and replaces him with the Tianqi Emperor, who is effectively a puppet ruler under his control. Wei Zhongxian plots with the Later Jin ruler Nurhachi to seize control of the Ming Empire.

Lian Nichang's senior Murong Chong is actually a Later Jin spy. To fulfil his dream of dominating the wulin, he uses a scheme to turn Lian Nichang and Zhuo Yihang against each other.

Lian Nichang falsely believes that Zhuo Yihang has betrayed her love and her hair turns white overnight. She leaves in anger and travels to northwestern China. Zhuo Yihang is unwilling to give up on Lian Nichang and he finally resolves his misunderstanding with her after experiencing hardships.

Zhuo Yihang and Lian Nichang rally fellow martial artists from the wulin to help them deal with the Later Jin invaders. The heroes defeat the Later Jin forces at Shanhai Pass and temporarily halt the invasion. By then, the Tianqi Emperor had died and is succeeded by the Chongzhen Emperor.

The Chongzhen Emperor believes slanderous rumours and executes the loyal Ming general Yuan Chonghuan. Without Yuan Chonghuan to defend Shanhai Pass, Zhuo Yihang and Lian Nichang foresee that the Ming Empire will eventually fall to the Later Jin. They decide to permanently retire from the wulin to lead peaceful lives.

== Cast ==
- Jiang Qinqin as Lian Nichang
- Julian Cheung as Zhuo Yihang
- Lin Fangbing as Honghua Guimu
- Chen Chun-sheng as Murong Chong
- Zhang Heng as Meng Qiuxia
- Ku Pao-ming as Xiao Xiao
- Chang Chin as Miao Huichun
- Chang Luo-chun as Wang Zhaoxi
- Li Hui-ying as Tie Shanhu
- Feng Kuang-jung as Tudou
- Geng Yong as Duniangzi
- Chou Shao-tung as Wei Zhongxian
- Wang Bozhao as the Taichang Emperor
- Yu Chia-hui as He Ehua
- Liu Kemian as Geng Shaonan
- Liu Naiyi as Qingsong
