= Seven Swords =

2005 film by Tsui Hark

- Theatrical poster
- 七劍
- Directed by: Tsui Hark
- Screenplay by: Tsui Hark; Cheung Chi-sing; Chun Tin-nam
- Based on: Qijian Xia Tianshan by Liang Yusheng
- Produced by: Tsui Hark; Ma Zhongjun; Lee Joo-ick; Pan Zhizhong
- Starring: Donnie Yen; Leon Lai; Charlie Yeung; Sun Honglei; Lu Yi; Kim So-yeon
- Cinematography: Keung Kwok-man; Herman Yau; Choi Shung-fai
- Edited by: Angie Lam
- Music by: Kenji Kawai
- Production companies: Beijing Ciwen Digital Oriental Film & TV Production; Film Workshop; Boram Entertainment; Fortissimo Films
- Distributed by: Mandarin Films Distribution Co. Ltd. (Hong Kong); China Film Group (China); Tube Entertainment (South Korea); A-Film Distribution (Netherlands)
- Release date: 29 July 2005
- Running time: 153 minutes
- Countries: Hong Kong; China; South Korea; Netherlands
- Languages: Mandarin; Korean
- Budget: US$18 million
- Box office: US$3,473,290

Seven Swords (七劍) is a 2005 wuxia film produced and directed by Tsui Hark, starring Donnie Yen, Leon Lai, Charlie Yeung, Sun Honglei, Lu Yi and Kim So-yeon. An international co-production between Hong Kong, China, South Korea and the Netherlands, it served as the opening film to the 2005 Venice Film Festival and pays homage to Akira Kurosawa's 1954 film Seven Samurai. Loosely adapted from Liang Yusheng's wuxia novel Qijian Xia Tianshan, it follows the story of seven swordsmen, each wielding a special sword, protecting a village under attack by a ruthless warlord.

== Synopsis ==
In 17th-century China, after the Qing dynasty bans the common people from practising martial arts, the warlord Fire-Wind seizes the chance to enforce the decree for profit. His army cuts down rebels and civilians across northwest China, and his next target is Martial Village, home to many martial artists.

Fu Qingzhu, a former executioner seeking redemption, brings two villagers, Han Zhibang and Wu Yuanying, to the reclusive swordmaster Shadow-Glow for help. Shadow-Glow sends his four apprentices – Chu Zhaonan, Yang Yuncong, Xin Longzi and Mulang – and arms all seven of them with specially forged swords. Together, they become the "Seven Swords".

They return in time to repel Fire-Wind's first assault and sabotage his base to delay pursuit. During the raid, Chu Zhaonan saves Green Pearl, a Korean woman enslaved by Fire-Wind. As the villagers evacuate into the hills, their supplies are poisoned and their trail exposed, revealing a spy in their midst. Green Pearl, unable to speak their language, becomes the main suspect, though she and Chu Zhaonan grow close. Guided by her knowledge, they attempt to destroy Fire-Wind's treasury but fall into a trap. Green Pearl escapes and warns the others before succumbing to her wounds, while Chu Zhaonan is captured.

While the other six swordsmen go to rescue Chu Zhaonan, the spy Qiu Dongluo reveals himself, kills the village chief, and begins massacring the unsuspecting villagers. The village chief's daughter, Liu Yufang, ultimately kills the spy, but the ordeal leaves her traumatised. Meanwhile, the Seven Swords defeat Fire-Wind and scatter his army, with Chu Zhaonan slaying the warlord in a duel. When they return, they find only Liu Yufang and the children alive.

Realising that defeating Fire-Wind changes nothing while the martial-arts ban remains in place, the Seven Swords resolve to petition the emperor to withdraw it. Han Zhibang briefly stays behind to protect the survivors, but Liu Yufang urges him to rejoin his companions, and he soon catches up as they head towards the capital.

== Cast ==
- Donnie Yen as Chu Zhaonan
- Leon Lai as Yang Yuncong
- Lau Kar-leung as Fu Qingzhu
- Charlie Yeung as Wu Yuanying
- Lu Yi as Han Zhibang
- Duncan Chow as Mulang
- Tai Li-wu as Xin Longzi
- Sun Honglei as Fire-Wind
- Kim So-yeon as Green Pearl
- Zhang Jingchu as Liu Yufang
- Ma Jingwu as Shadow-Glow
- Michael Wong as Dokado
- Jason Lau as Liu Jingyi
- Chi Kuan-Chun as Qiu Dongluo

== Production ==
The film was the first of a planned six-part film franchise.

During the shooting of the ending fight scene, Donnie Yen accidentally injured Sun Honglei near the eye after mistakenly assuming that Sun was trained in martial arts. Sun was rushed from Xinjiang to a hospital in Beijing on the night of 7 December. His eyesight was not affected so he returned to the set a day later and insisted on finishing his scenes.

== Casting ==
The role of Chu Zhaonan was initially offered to Korean actor Song Seung-heon at a reported salary of US$400,000. Director Tsui Hark recruited Leon Lai to portray Yang Yuncong after watching his performance in The Sword of Many Loves and wanting to "see another side of him". Song and Lai were trained in horse riding and swordplay for their respective roles but Song dropped out near the start of the filming period to work on other projects. Donnie Yen was then offered to play Chu Zhaonan, and he accepted the offer without hesitation after "understanding the gravity" of the situation.

Lu Yi, who portrayed Han Zhibang, once said that he would never act in wuxia or martial arts films again. However, when he saw the all-star cast tied to the project, he immediately accepted the offer to join because he felt it was a rare opportunity for him to work with such a strong cast.

The role of Prince Dokado was initially offered to Hu Jun, who rejected it for reasons unknown. It was later offered to Wang Xueqi, who similarly turned down the offer. The role eventually went to Michael Wong.

== Release ==
Cheung Chi-sing, the production manager and scriptwriter, revealed that the initial cut made by Angie Lam was four hours long. However, the distributors were worried that such a lengthy running time would limit screening arrangements and affect box office performance, so Tsui re-edited it to two versions – 150 minutes and 120 minutes. After finding that the 120 minutes version suffered from underdevelopment, the investors chose the 150 minutes version for the theatrical run.

== Reception ==
Seven Swords was well received in Asia, being nominated for many awards in both Hong Kong and China. Its US limited-release received generally negative reviews and holds a 25% "rotten" rating on Rotten Tomatoes based on 15 reviews.

== Sequel and reboot ==
Tsui Hark intended Seven Swords to be a heptalogy and initially confirmed in 2005 that a sequel was in progress, but it was never completed by 2006. The project is subsequently abandoned for unknown reasons.

In 2019 and 2020, Tencent and others produced a television film trilogy directed by Francis Nam. The trilogy is also loosely adapted from Qijian Xia Tianshan, but is unrelated to Tsui Hark's Seven Swords although it features the seven special swords first introduced in the 2005 film.

== See also ==
- Qijian Xia Tianshan
- Seven Swordsmen
