= White Hair Devil Lady =

1980 Hong Kong film by Chang Hsin-yen

- Film poster
- 白髮魔女傳
- Directed by: Chang Hsin-yen
- Screenplay by: Chang Hsin-yen; Leung Chi-keung
- Based on: Baifa Monü Zhuan by Liang Yusheng
- Starring: Paw Hee-ching; Henry Fong Ping
- Cinematography: Lee Yuk-Shing; Chau Pak-ling
- Edited by: Lee Yuk-Wai
- Production company: Great Wall Movie Enterprises
- Release date: 24 July 1980
- Running time: 94 minutes
- Country: Hong Kong
- Language: Cantonese
- Box office: HK$2,036,919

White Hair Devil Lady (Chinese: 白髮魔女傳), also known as Sorceress' Wrath, is a 1980 Hong Kong wuxia film adapted from the novel Baifa Monü Zhuan by Liang Yusheng. The film was directed by Chang Hsin-yen and starred Paw Hee-ching and Henry Fong.

== Cast ==
- Paw Hee-ching as Lian Nichang
- Henry Fong Ping as Zhuo Yihang
- Leanne Liu as Tie Shanhu
- Chiang Han as Murong Chong
- Ping Fan as Tie Feilong
- Cheung Ping as Yue Mingke
