= Nina Paw =

Hong Kong actress

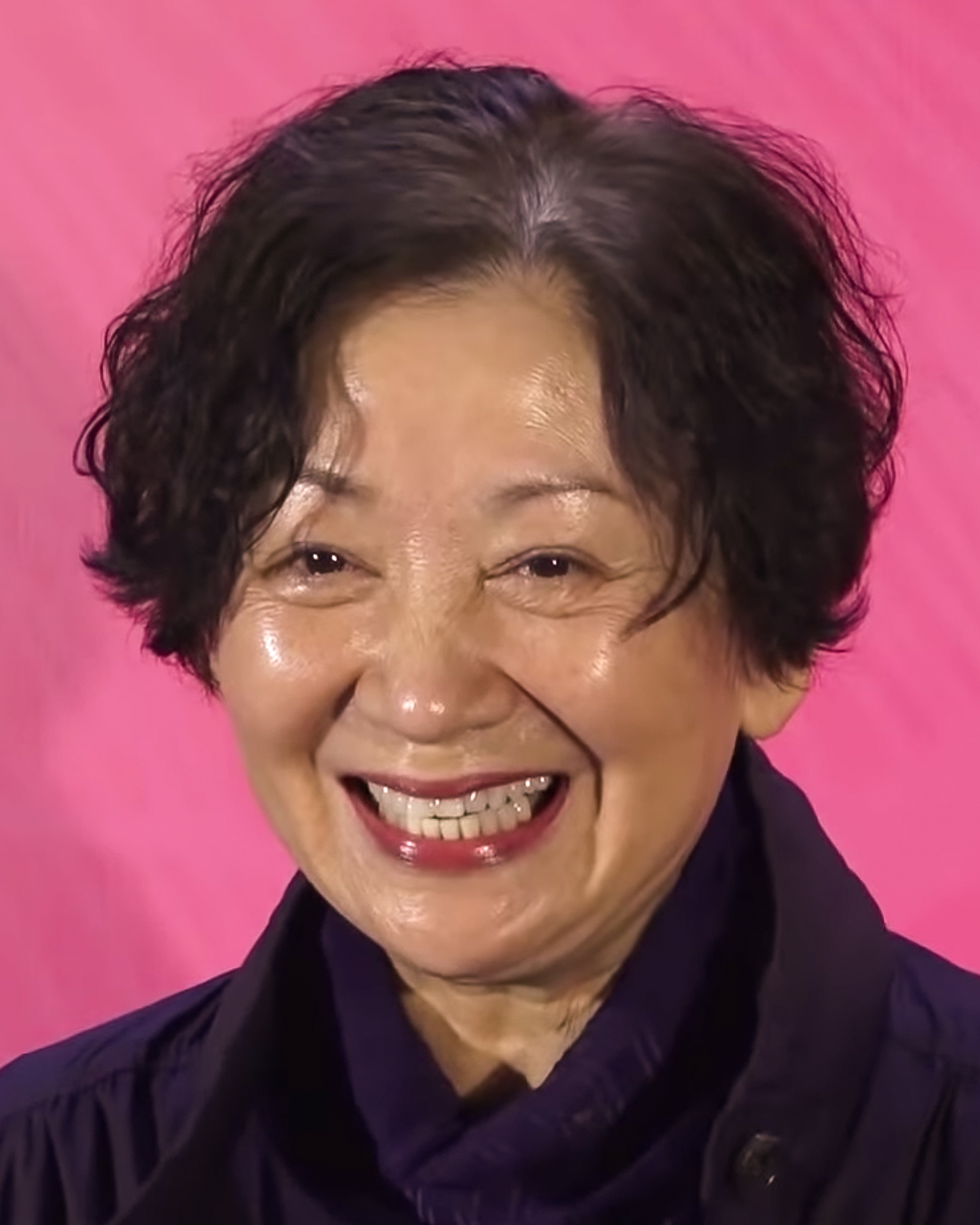
- Paw in 2018
- Born: 20 July 1949 (age 77); Hong Kong
- Occupations: Actress; show host
- Spouse: Henry Fong (m. 1980)
- Parent(s): Bao Fong (鮑方); Liu Su (劉甦)
- Awards: Hong Kong Film Awards – Best Actress; 2009 The Way We Are Hong Kong Film Critics Society Awards – Best Actress; 2009 The Way We Are

Chinese name
- Traditional Chinese: 鮑起靜
- Simplified Chinese: 鲍起静
Transcriptions
Standard Mandarin
- Hanyu Pinyin: Bào Qǐjìng
- Musical career
- Also known as: Sister Paw (鮑姐)

Nina Paw Hee-ching (Chinese: 鮑起靜; born 20 July 1949) is a Hong Kong actress. Paw got her start in film but came into prominence portraying mothers on ATV television dramas, such as Fatherland (1980). Having portrayed many mother and elder sister roles throughout her career, she is often referred to as "Sister Paw". Her portrayal of a working mother in The Way We Are (2008) won her four best actress awards, including Best Actress at the 28th Hong Kong Film Awards.

== Early life ==
Paw grew up in a Kowloon City apartment with her parents, grandparents, and two siblings. She graduated from Heung To Middle School in 1968.

== Career ==
Paw joined Great Wall Film Production in 1968 for ten years. She was known for starring in the lead role of White Hair Devil Lady (1980) opposite Henry Fong Ping.

Paw joined Asia Television in the 1980s, playing mostly motherly roles. When offered a job at competing TVB, she declined as her infotainment hosting schedule at ATV allowed her to spend more time raising her daughter. She worked at ATV for 33 years before moving to Hong Kong Television Network in 2012.

In September 2016, she acted in the first TV drama "Allied" for TVB, and was selected as one of the final five finalists for "Best Actress" in the "Million Stars Awards 2017".

In 2019, New World Development, which is responsible for the Hong Kong Avenue of Stars project, said that nine new movie queens, including Pao Kee-ching, had been added to the Avenue of Stars after its reopening on 31 January.

In 2020, it participated in the joint sign-up to support the Hong Kong version of the National Security Law.

== Personal life ==
Her parents are actors Bao Fong and Liu Su. She has an older sister, Her younger brother is cinematographer Peter Pau.

She is married to Henry Fong Ping, who is also an actor. She has one daughter.

She resided on Hong Kong Island.

== Filmography ==
=== Films and television dramas ===
Year	Title	Role	Notes
1976	The Stormy Sea		
1977	Chu Yuan	Chanjuan	
1978	Young and Lovable		
1979	The Almighty Extra		
1980	White Hair Devil Lady 白发魔女传	Lian Nichang	
1980	Fatherland 大地恩情	Yung Tat 容達	
1986	Rise of the Great Wall 秦始皇	Lady Zhao 趙姬	
1987	Mother 母親	Man Pui Shan 文佩珊	
1990	Bullet in the Head	Ben's mother	
1992	Casino Tycoon		
1993	The Mad Monk		
1996	The Good Old Days	Fa Yim-Ha	
1997	All's Well, Ends Well 1997; 97家有囍事	Shenny's mother	
1997	The Year of Chameleon; 97變色龍	Choi Mei-Chun 蔡美珍	
1999	Ordinary Heroes	Tung's mother	Nominated – Hong Kong Film Award for Best Supporting Actress
1999	Criss-Cross Over Four Seas 縱橫四海	Bak Yin 白宴	
2000	Divine Retribution		
2000	Showbiz Tycoon	Fong Chi-lin	
2002	So Close	Mother	
2003	Lost in Time	Siu Wai's mother	Nominated – Hong Kong Film Award for Best Supporting Actress
2003	Light of Million Hopes 萬家燈火		
2004	One Nite in Mongkok	Volunteer Helper at Sue's home	
2005	Central Affairs 情陷夜中環	Ching-Man Suet-yee 程文雪凝	
2006	Fearless 霍元甲	Yuanjia's mother	
2007	Mr. Cinema	Lee Choi Ha	
2007	Xiang gang jie mei	Chen Fuzhen	
2007	Ma Jong Gathering 十六不搭喜趣來	Fong Ming-Yun 方明圓	
2008	The Way We Are	Mrs. Cheung	Hong Kong Film Award for Best Actress; Hong Kong Film Critics Society Award for Best Actress
2008	Ocean Flame		
2008	Flaming Butterfly 火蝴蝶	Man So-Kun 文素娟	
2009	I Corrupt All Cops		
2009	To Live and Die in Mongkok		
2010	Crossing Hennessy	Ar Loh's mother	Nominated – Hong Kong Film Award for Best Supporting Actress
2010	Dream Home		
2010	Reign of Assassins		
2010	Hong Kong Go Go Go		
2011	All's Well, Ends Well 2011		
2011	Sleepwalker		
2012	Wu Dang	Shui Heyi's mother	
2013	Angel is Coming		TV series
2013	Rigor Mortis	Auntie Mui	Nominated – Hong Kong Film Award for Best Actress
2013	Special ID	Sister Amy	
2015	ATM		
2015	Insanity		
2015	Beyond the Rainbow		TV series
2015	Detective Gui		
2015	Are You Here		
2016	Show Me Your Love		Nominated – Hong Kong Film Award for Best Actress
2018	Half A Good Woman		
2018	The Unholy Alliance 同盟	Ling Hung 令熊	
2018	Guardian Angel 2018 Web Drama 守護神之保險調查	Bak Siu-ling	Shaw Brothers Web Drama
2019	I Love You, You're Perfect, Now Change!		
2019	First Class Charge		
2019	I'm Livin' It	Leung Wan-lan	
2019	Beyond The Dream	Dr. Fung	
2020	Forensic Heroes IV 法證先鋒IV	So Fong 蘇芳	Special Appearance
2020	My Prince Edward 金都	Edward's mother	Nominated – Hong Kong Film Award for Best Supporting Actress
2020	Caught in Time 除暴	Zhang Sun's mother	Nominated – Hong Kong Film Award for Best Supporting Actress
2021	Sinister Beings 逆天奇案	Grandmother	Special Appearance
2021	The Kwoks And What 我家無難事	Law Mei-lan 羅美蘭	Nominated — TVB Anniversary Award for Best Actress; Nominated — TVB Anniversary Award for Most Popular Female Character (Top 10); Nominated — TVB Anniversary Award for Most Popular Onscreen Partnership (with Joe Ma, Stephanie Che, Mat Yeung and Fei Wu); Nominated — TVB Anniversary Award for Favourite TVB Actress in Malaysia
2022	Get On A Flat 下流上車族	Tse Yuk-ha 謝毓霞	Nominated — TVB Anniversary Award for Best Actress (Top 5); Nominated — TVB Anniversary Award for Most Popular Female Character (Top 10); Nominated — TVB Anniversary Award for Favourite TVB Actress in Malaysia
2024	Wonderland	Bai Li's mother	
2025	Sons of the Neon Night	Sister Huan	
2025	Finch & Midland	Mrs. Ng	

=== Music video appearances ===
Year	Artist	Song title
2016	Alfred Hui	"My Aspiration"
2017	Hacken Lee	"失魂記"
2017	Stefanie Sun	"Windbreaker"
2019	Kristal Tin	"最親"
2021	Jennifer Yu	"Accompany"
2022	Fatboy	"Dear MaMa"
