= Li Xiaoran =

Chinese actress (born 1976)

- Born: May 8, 1976 (age 50); Chaoyang District, Beijing
- Education: Beijing Dance Academy
- Occupation: Actress
- Years active: 1996–present
- Agent: Qianyi Times
- Spouse: Xu Jianing (m. 2014)

Li Xiaoran (Chinese: 李小冉; born 8 May 1976) is a Chinese actress.

== Early life and education ==
Li Xiaoran was born in the Chaoyang District, Beijing, the People's Republic of China, on 8 May 1976. She graduated from Beijing Dance Academy (BDA) at the age of 17.

== Career ==
Xiaoran is a Chinese actress. After she finished her training at the BDA, she was recruited into the Oriental Song and Dance Troupe from Beijing.

== Filmography ==
Year	English title	Chinese title	Role	Notes
1998		谁让咱们是亲戚		television film
1999		绿色婚礼		television film
2002	Ghosts	凶宅幽灵	Zhang Aiqiu	
2002	No Lonely Angels	天使不寂寞	Ye Fan	
2004	Baober in Love	恋爱中的宝贝		Guest
2004	The Game of Killing	天黑请闭眼	Ailian	
2006	Dragon Tiger Gate	龙虎门	Luosha	
2006	Les filles du botaniste	植物学家的女儿	Chen An'an	
2008	Out of Control	过界	Li Xiao'an	
2009	East Wind Rain	东风雨	Hao Birou	
2010	Driverless	无人驾驶	Chang Qing	
2011	To Love or Not	爱·不爱	Gu Ting	
2011	Wu Xia	武侠	Xu Bai's ninth wife	
2012	Ripples of Desire	花漾	Zhen Furong	
2013	Love Retake	爱情不NG	Wu Di	
2013	An End to Killing	止杀令	Qi Dan'nv	
2013	The Nightingale	夜莺	Ren Qingying	

=== Television series ===
Year	English title	Chinese title	Role	Notes
1996	Jade Baby of Body Guard	保镖之翡翠娃娃	Muk-yung Bak	Guest appearance
1997		双凤奇案	Qiuju	
1997		来来往往	Dai Xiaolei / Shi Yufeng	
1998	Huankan Jinzhao	还看今朝	Hu Xin	
1999	Master of Zen	达摩祖师	Lian'er	
2000		白日	Huang Xuping	
2001	'	金蚕丝雨	Dugu Feng	
2001	Love Story in Shanghai	像雾像雨又像风	An Qi	
2001	Dynasty Doctor	皇朝太医	Lei Lei	
2001		爱在阳光灿烂时	Lin Xintong	
2002		浪迹天涯	Tao Jianxiu	
2002		皇宫宝贝	Princess Yuming	
2003		生命因你而美丽	Yi Wuhua	
2003	The Price of Glory	刺虎	Gu Xiulan	
2004	Farewell Vancouver	别了，温哥华	Yang Xi	
2004	Treacherous Waters	逆水寒	Xi Honglei	
2004	Tale of Bage	巴哥正传		Guest appearance
2005		大清奇案之鸳鸯绣	Wei Qiquan	
2005	Soaring Ambition Justice Bao	凌云壮志包青天	Lan Rushi	alternative title Jianlin Tianxia (剑临天下)
2005	Jin Mao Xiang	金茂祥	Xu Xiaoman	
2005	Fairy Tale of Paris	天桥的童话	Lan Ni	
2005		家变	Liu Meng	
2005	Seven Swordsmen	七剑下天山	Nalan Minghui	
2006	Marry for Love	为爱结婚	Lu Mi	
2006		可可·西里	Ma Erjie	
2006	The Legendary Warrior	薛仁贵传奇	Beauty Zhang	
2006	Immortal Feats	功勋	Zhuo Yue	
2006	Romance in the White House	白屋之恋	Tong Lei	alternative title Tianguo Liange (天国恋歌)
2007	Home	家	Mei Fen	
2007	Fly With Me	想飞	Xiangxiang	
2008	Indanthrone	阴丹士林	Jiang Yunjing	
2008	Royal Embroidery Workshop	凤穿牡丹	Yu Wuxia	
2008	Night of Harbin	夜幕下的哈尔滨	Lu Qiuying	
2008	Military Doctor	军医	Guo Sanmei	
2009	Love in Great Times	人间情缘	Qin Qian	alternative title Zai Renjian (在人间)
2009	Remembrance of Dreams Past	故梦	Wang Lianjun	
2009		赖布衣传奇	Princess Lanxin	Guest appearance
2009		南下	Zhou Yu	
2010	Too Late to Say Loving You	来不及说我爱你	Yi Jingwan / Su Ying	
2011	Spring Flowers Blossoming	春暖花开	Ye Xiaowei	
2011	By Marriage to Remember	钱多多嫁人记	Qian Duoduo	
2012		莲花	Lian Hua	
2013	Angels Cometh Tonight	今夜天使降临	Lin Ting	
2013	Only Hero	独有英雄	Fen Die	
2014	The River Children	大河儿女	Ye Feixia	
2014	May–December Love	大丈夫	Gu Xiaojun	
2015	Fighting	激战	Guan Ying	
2015	Graduation Song	毕业歌	Sang Xia	
2015	Pretty Wife	老婆大人是80后	Wang Xiaolu	
2016	Two Families	姐妹兄弟	Tang Xiaoxue	
2016	The Chaser	追击者	Fu Yun	
2016	Sparrow	麻雀	Shen Chunxia	Special appearance
2016	Hey, Kids	嘿，孩子	Jia Yuanyuan	
2017	The Kite	风筝	Lin Tao	
2018	Wonderful Life	美好生活	Liang Xiaohui	
2018	Next Time, Together Forever	下一站，别离	Sheng Xia	
2018	Mr. Nanny	月嫂先生	Nana	
2019	In Law We Believe	因法之名	Zou Tong	
2019	My Robot Boyfriend	我的机器人男友		also producer
2019	Unknown Number	时空来电	He Jun	
2019	Joy of Life	庆余年	Li Yunrui	
2020	Autumn Cicada	秋蝉	Jiang Yue	
2020	Together	在一起		
2021	Three-Body	三体	Shen Yufei	

== Awards and nominations ==
Year	Award	Category	Nominated work	Result	Ref.
2005	14th Chunyan Awards	Best Supporting Actress	Farewell Vancouver	Won	
2014	20th Shanghai Television Festival	Best Actress	May December Love	Nominated	
2014	20th Shanghai Television Festival	Most Popular Actress	May December Love	Won	
2016	19th Huading Awards	Best Actress (Revolutionary-Era Drama)	Graduation Song	Nominated	
2018	24th Huading Awards	Best Supporting Actress	The Kite	Nominated	
2018	24th Huading Awards	Best Actress (Modern Drama)	Wonderful Life	Nominated	
2020	7th The Actors of China Award Ceremony	Best Actress (Sapphire)	—N/a	Pending	
