= The Romance of the White Hair Maiden (1995 TV series) =

1995 Hong Kong TV series

- DVD cover art
- 白髮魔女傳
- Genre: Wuxia
- Based on: Baifa Monü Zhuan by Liang Yusheng
- Screenplay by: Au Kin-yee; Yim Lai-wah; Fung Yuen-kam
- Directed by: Yau Tat-chi; Luk Tin-wah; Lai Tsi-kim; Lau Kwok-fai
- Starring: Ada Choi; Timmy Ho
- Opening theme: "Wait for You Until My Hair Turns White" (等你到白頭) by Eric Moo and Cass Phang
- Ending theme: "A Life in This World is But a Dream" (紅塵來去一場夢) by Eric Moo
- Country of origin: Hong Kong
- Original language: Cantonese
- No. of episodes: 20

Production
- Producer: Siu Hin-fai
- Production location: Hong Kong
- Running time: ≈ 45 minutes per episode
- Production company: TVB

Original release
- Network: TVB
- Release: 9 January – 3 February 1995

The Romance of the White Hair Maiden (白髮魔女傳) is a Hong Kong wuxia television series adapted from the novel Baifa Monü Zhuan by Liang Yusheng. The series was released overseas in December 1994 before broadcasting on TVB Jade in Hong Kong in January 1995.

== Synopsis ==
The series is set in 17th-century China during the Ming dynasty. Zhuo Yihang, a Wudang Sect swordsman well-versed in literary arts and swordsmanship, earns the crown prince's favour and receives an invitation to serve in the palace. The outlaw Lian Nichang, who was raised by wolves, has also been well-trained in swordsmanship by Ling Muhua and has earned herself the nickname "Jade Rakshasa" for her fierce sense of justice.

When Lian Nichang comes under attack by government agents, Zhuo Yihang saves her and they start a romance. Later, Lian Nichang risks her life to rescue Zhuo Yihang and confesses her love to him. However, he is hesitant as they come from opposing sides of the wulin. A heartbroken Lian Nichang leaves.

When they meet again later, Zhuo Yihang has decided that Lian Nichang is his true love and accepts her. They team up to defeat the corrupt eunuch Wei Zhongxian and his followers.

However, their romance is short-lived as Zhuo Yihang's junior Geng Shaonan intentionally causes a misunderstanding between the lovers, resulting in Zhuo Yihang wounding Lian Nichang. Thinking that Zhuo Yihang has betrayed her, Lian Nichang's hair turns white overnight. Zhuo Yihang regrets his action and tries to reconcile with Lian Nichang, but it is too late.

== Cast ==
- Ada Choi as Lian Nichang
- Timmy Ho as Zhuo Yihang
- Gary Chan as Yue Mingke
- Chow Ching as He Ehua
- Wong Wai as Wei Zhongxian
- Newton Lai as Li Zicheng
- Joanna Chan as Tie Shanhu
- Jason Pai as Tie Feilong
- Wu Yuet-san as Wang Zhaoxi
- Joe Ma as Zhu Changluo
- Zhang Yan as Meng Qiuxia
- Helen Ma as Honghua Guimu
- Lo Mang as Huo Tiandu
- Lee Kwai-ying as Ling Muhua
- Henry Lee as Baishi
- Kwan Ching as Jin Duyi
