= Tian Zheng =

Chinese-American statistician

Tian Zheng is a Chinese-American applied statistician whose work concerns Bayesian modeling and sparse learning of complex data from applications including social networks, bioinformatics, and geoscience. She is a professor of statistics at Columbia University, and chair of the Columbia Department of Statistics.

== Education and career ==
Zheng was a child of Tsinghua University faculty, and graduated from Tsinghua University in 1998, majoring in applied mathematics with a minor in computer science. Her interest in statistics was sparked by a junior-year project in medical data processing. She went to Columbia University for graduate study in statistics, and earned a master's degree in 2000 and a Ph.D. in 2002. Her dissertation, Multiple-Marker Screening Approach Towards the Study of Complex Traits in Human Genetics, was supervised by Shaw-Hwa Lo.

She remained at Columbia as an assistant professor in statistics, became an untenured associate professor in 2007, and was granted tenure in 2012. She was promoted to full professor in 2017, and became department chair in 2019.

== Recognition ==
Zheng became an Elected Member of the International Statistical Institute in 2011, and a Fellow of the American Statistical Association in 2014. She was named to the 2022 class of Fellows of the Institute of Mathematical Statistics, for "fundamental research on sparsity and variable importance, and for significant contributions to social network theory and to genetics".
