= The Romance of the White Hair Maiden (1986 TV series) =

1986 Hong Kong TV series

- DVD cover art
- 白髮魔女傳
- Genre: Wuxia
- Based on: Baifa Monü Zhuan by Liang Yusheng
- Starring: Bonnie Ngai; Savio Tsang
- Country of origin: Hong Kong
- Original language: Cantonese
- No. of episodes: 20

Production
- Producer: Amy Wong
- Production location: Hong Kong
- Running time: ≈ 45 minutes per episode
- Production company: ATV

Original release
- Network: ATV
- Release: 9 June 1986 – 1986

The Romance of the White Hair Maiden (白髮魔女傳) is a Hong Kong wuxia television series adapted from the novel Baifa Monü Zhuan by Liang Yusheng. The series was first broadcast on ATV in Hong Kong in 1986.

== Cast ==
- Bonnie Ngai as Lian Nichang
- Savio Tsang as Zhuo Yihang
- Chen Kuan-tai as Yue Mingke
- Wong Jo-see as Tie Shanhu
- Amy Yip as Meng Qiuxia
- Cheng Lui as Jin Duyi
- Lau Wan-fung as Shi Hao
- Cheung Kam as Bai Min
- Lau Siu-kwan as Geng Shaonan
- Kam Tung as Wei Zhongxian
- Willie Lau as Murong Chong
- Cheung Tsang as Tie Feilong
- So Suk-ping as Mu Jiuniang
- Tong Pan-cheung as Wang Zhaoxi
- Cheng Gwan-min as Zhenqian
- Cho Tat-wah as Baishi
- Pau Hon-lam as Zhuo Zhonglian
- Leung Ming as Xiong Tingbi
- Lai Suen as Honghua Guimu
- Au Wing-hon as Zhu Changluo
- Ng Tsi-yin as He Ehua
- Ling Man-hoi as Yuan Chonghuan
- Lee Ka-ling as Ke Pingting
- Ting Ying as Madam Ke
- Wong Wai as Zhu Youjiao
