= List of Hong Kong television series =

This is an incomplete list of Hong Kong television series and programmes.

== Current shows ==
=== Children's ===
- After School ICU (TVB Jade, in Cantonese)

=== Current affairs ===
- City Forum (RTHK, in Cantonese)
- Headliner (RTHK, in Cantonese)
- The Pearl Report (TVB, in English)
- Police Report (RTHK. in Cantonese and English)
- The Pulse (RTHK. in English)

=== Game shows ===
- Super Trio Series (TVB, in Cantonese)

=== Lifestyle ===
- Dolce Vita (TVB, in English)

=== Music ===
- Jade Solid Gold (TVB, in Cantonese)

=== News ===
- News at 6:30 (TVB Jade, in Cantonese)

=== Talk and variety ===
- Miss Hong Kong Pageant (TVB, in Cantonese, broadcast annually)

== Past shows ==
Name		Genre	Language	Producer
English	Chinese	Genre	Language	Producer
3X1	三一如三	Drama	Cantonese	ViuTV
A Kindred Spirit	真情	Soap opera	Cantonese	TVB
Against the Blade of Honour	圓月彎刀	Drama	Cantonese	TVB
Al Cappuccino	反黑路人甲	Drama	Cantonese	TVB
All In A Family	四海一家	Drama	Cantonese	TVB
All That is Bitter is Sweet	大藥坊	Drama	Cantonese	TVB
Always Ready	隨時候命	Drama	Cantonese	TVB
Ambition	孽吻	Thriller	Cantonese	TVB
Angels of Mission	無名天使	Drama	Cantonese	TVB
Aqua Heroes	戀愛自由式	Drama	Cantonese	TVB
Armed Reaction	陀槍師姐	Drama	Cantonese	TVB
Asia Squawk Box		Drama	English	CNBC Asia
At Home With Love	樓住有情人	Drama	Cantonese	TVB
At Point Blank	婚姻乏術/	Drama	Cantonese	TVB
At the Threshold of An Era	創世紀	Drama	Cantonese	TVB
Au Revoir Shanghai	上海傳奇	Drama	Cantonese	TVB
Bar Bender	潮爆大狀	Drama	Cantonese	TVB
Battlefield Network	電視風雲	Drama	Cantonese	ATV
Be My Guest	志雲飯局	Talk and variety	Cantonese	TVB
Beautiful Cooking	美女廚房	Game show	Cantonese	TVB
The Beauty of the Game	美麗高解像	Drama	Cantonese	TVB
Behind Silk Curtains	大都會	Drama	Cantonese	TVB
Below the Lion Rock	獅子山下	Documentary	Cantonese	RTHK
Best Bet	迎妻接福	Drama	Cantonese	TVB
Best Selling Secrets	同事三分親	Drama	Cantonese	TVB
Better Halves	金牌冰人	Drama	Cantonese	TVB
Between Love & Desire	完美叛侶	Drama	Cantonese	TVB
Beyond the Rainbow	歲月樓情	Drama	Cantonese	HKTV
Beyond the Realm of Conscience	宮心計	Drama	Cantonese	TVB
Big White Duel	白色強人	Drama	Cantonese	TVB
The Biter Bitten	人生馬戲團	Drama	Cantonese	TVB
The Blood Sword	中華英雄	Drama	Cantonese	ATV
The Borderline	警界線	Drama	Cantonese	HKTV
The Breaking Point	今生無悔	Drama	Cantonese	TVB
The Brink Of Law	突圍行動	Drama	Cantonese	TVB
The Building Blocks of Life	建築有情天	Drama	Cantonese	TVB
The Buddhism Palm Strikes Back	如來神掌再戰江湖	Drama, Comedy	Cantonese	TVB
Burning Hands	乘勝狙擊	Drama	Cantonese	TVB
Can't Buy Me Love	公主嫁到	Drama	Cantonese	TVB
Captain of Destiny	張保仔	Historical fiction Science fiction Drama	Cantonese	TVB
A Change of Destiny	天機算	Drama	Cantonese	TVB
Central Affairs	情陷夜中環	Drama	Cantonese	ATV
A Chip Off the Old Block	巴不得爸爸	Drama	Cantonese	TVB
Come On, Cousin	老表，你好hea！	Comedy	Cantonese	TVB
Come with Me	性在有情	Comedy	Cantonese	TVB
The Comeback Clan	翻叮一族	Drama	Cantonese	TVB
The Condor Heroes 95	神鵰俠侶	Drama	Cantonese	TVB
The Criminal Investigator; The Criminal Investigator II	O記實錄	Drama	Cantonese	TVB
Crimson Sabre	碧血劍	Drama	Cantonese	TVB
Daddy Dearest	超能老豆	Comedy	Cantonese	TVB
Dead Wrong	致命復活	Drama	Cantonese	TVB
Deadly Secret		Drama	Cantonese	TVB
Deal or No Deal		Game show	Cantonese	TVB
Deep in the Realm of Conscience	宮心計2: 深宮計	Drama	Cantonese	TVB
Demi-Gods and Semi-Devils (1982); Demi-Gods and Semi-Devils (1997)		Drama	Cantonese	TVB
The Disappearance	隱形怪傑	Science fiction Comedy	Cantonese	TVB
Divine Retribution	世紀之戰	Drama	Cantonese	ATV
Doom+5	末日+5	Drama	Cantonese	HKTV
The Duke of Mount Deer (1984); The Duke of Mount Deer (1998)		Drama	Cantonese	TVB
The Election	選戰	Drama	Cantonese	HKTV
The Emissary	獵鷹	Drama	Cantonese	TVB
Empress Wu	武則天	Drama	Cantonese	ATV
Enjoy Yourself Tonight		Talk and variety	Cantonese	TVB
Every Move You Make		Drama	Cantonese	TVB
Fist of Fury	精武門	Martial arts	Cantonese	ATV
A Fistful of Stances		Drama	Cantonese	TVB
Flaming Butterfly	火蝴蝶	Drama	Cantonese	ATV
The Flying Fox of Snowy Mountain (1985); The Flying Fox of Snowy Mountain (1999)		Drama	Cantonese	TVB
Fox Volant of the Snowy Mountain	雪山飛狐	Martial arts	Cantonese	ATV
From Hand to Art		Arts and culture	Cantonese	TVB
Genghis Khan	成吉思汗	Drama	Cantonese	ATV
Ghost Writer		Drama	Cantonese	TVB
Golden Faith		Drama	Cantonese	TVB
The Good Old Days	再見艷陽天	Drama	Cantonese	TVB
Growing Through Life		Drama	Cantonese	TVB
Gun Metal Grey		Drama	Cantonese	TVB
Happy Ever After		Drama	Cantonese	TVB
Heart of Greed		Drama	Cantonese	TVB
The Heaven Sword and Dragon Saber (1978); The Heaven Sword and Dragon Saber (2000)		Drama	Cantonese	TVB
The Heroine of the Yangs	穆桂英	Drama	Cantonese	HKTV
Hidden Faces	三面形醫	Drama	Cantonese	HKTV
Home Troopers		Drama	Cantonese	TVB
In the Eye of the Beholder		Drama	Cantonese	TVB
Incredible Mama	我阿媽係黑玫瑰	Action; Comedy	Cantonese	HKTV
Jade Starbiz		Talk and variety	Cantonese	TVB
Japan Time	Go! Japan TV 日本大放送	Travel	Cantonese	R by R
K-100		Talk and variety	Cantonese	TVB
Karma	驚異世紀	Horror	Cantonese	HKTV
The King of Yesterday and Tomorrow		Drama	Cantonese	TVB
The Legend of the Book and the Sword (1976); The Legend of the Book and the Sword (1987)		Drama	Cantonese	TVB
The Legend of the Condor Heroes (1983); The Legend of the Condor Heroes (1994)		Drama	Cantonese	TVB
The Legendary Prime Minister – Zhuge Liang	諸葛亮	Drama	Cantonese	ATV
Life Made Simple		Drama	Cantonese	TVB
Love in Time	還來得及再愛你	Drama	Cantonese	CTI
May Food Keep Us Together	飲食男女	Documentary	Cantonese	Peoples Production
The Men of Justice	法網群英	Drama	Cantonese	ATV
The Menu	導火新聞線	Drama	Cantonese	HKTV
Moonlight Resonance		Drama	Cantonese	TVB
My Date with a Vampire; My Date with a Vampire II; My Date with a Vampire III	我和殭屍有個約會	Horror; Comedy	Cantonese	ATV
The Mysteries of Love		Drama	Cantonese	TVB
New Heavenly Sword and Dragon Sabre		Drama	Cantonese	TVB
Night Shift	夜班	Thriller	Cantonese	HKTV
No Regrets		Drama	Cantonese	TVB
Ode to Gallantry		Drama	Cantonese	TVB
Once Upon a Song	童話戀曲201314	Drama	Cantonese	HKTV
Ossan's Love	大叔的愛	Drama, Comedy	Cantonese	ViuTV
Paranormal Mind	開腦儆探	Thriller	Cantonese	HKTV
A Pillow Case of Mystery; A Pillow Case of Mystery II		Drama	Cantonese	TVB
The Pride of Chaozhou	我來自潮州	Drama	Cantonese	ATV
Reincarnated	天蠶變	Martial arts	Cantonese	Rediffusion Television
The Return of the Condor Heroes		Drama	Cantonese	TVB
Rosy Business		Drama	Cantonese	TVB
The Season of Fate		Drama	Cantonese	TVB
Second Life	第二人生	Drama	Cantonese	HKTV
Sexpedia	大眾情性	Romance; Comedy	Cantonese	HKTV
Showbiz Tycoon	影城大亨	Drama	Cantonese	ATV
Sisters of Pearl		Drama	Cantonese	TVB
The Smiling, Proud Wanderer		Drama	Cantonese	TVB
State of Divinity		Drama	Cantonese	TVB
A Step into the Past		Drama	Cantonese	TVB
Suspects in Love		Drama	Cantonese	TVB
Sword Stained with Royal Blood		Drama	Cantonese	TVB
The Trading Floor	東方華爾街	Thriller	Cantonese	Focus Group
Tung Wah Charity Show		Talk and variety	Cantonese	TVB
Twilight Investigation		Drama	Cantonese	TVB
To Be or Not to Be	來生不做香港人	Drama	Cantonese	HKTV
Vampire Expert	殭屍道長	Drama	Cantonese	ATV
A Watchdog's Tale		Drama	Cantonese	TVB
Weakest Link		Game show	Cantonese	TVB
When Lanes Merge		Drama	Cantonese	TVB
The Wicked League	惡毒老人同盟	Comedy	Cantonese	HKTV

== See also ==
- List of programmes broadcast by Television Broadcasts Limited
