= List of Asia Television series =

This is a list of series released by Asia Television.

- 1976: Big Sister (大家姐)
- 1977: Network (電視人)
- 1978: In Cold Blood (追族)
- 1978: Crocodile Tears (鱷魚淚)
- 1978: Superstar (巨星)
- 1978: Con Gang (奇兵36)
- 1978: A Hong Kong Tragedy (郎心如鐵)
- 1978: Chinese New Horoscope (十二生肖)
- 1978: Chameleon (變色龍)
- 1979: Reincarnated (天蠶變)
- 1979: Dragon Strikes (天龍訣)
- 1979: Sword of Fury (怒劍鳴)
- 1979: Chameleon(II) (新變色龍)
- 1980: Dynasty (大內群英)
- 1980: Dynasty II (大內群英續集)
- 1980: Fatherland (大地恩情)
- 1980: Gone with the Wind (浮生六劫)
- 1980: Rainbow Connections (彩雲深處)
- 1981: The Legendary Fok (霍元甲)
- 1981: Newark File (女媧行動)
- 1981: Agency 24 (甜甜廿四味)
- 1981: The Magnificent 7 (蕩寇誌)
- 1982: The Fist (陳真)
- 1982: The Conqueror (雄霸天下)
- 1982: Another Time, Another Love (再生戀)
- 1982: Barber Shop (家姐、細佬、飛髮舖)
- 1983: The Romantic Poet (唐伯虎三戲秋香)
- 1983: Super Hero (鐵膽英雄)
- 1983: Young Dowager (少女慈禧)
- 1984: Drunken Fist (醉拳王無忌)
- 1984: Butterfly Killer (蝴蝶血)
- 1984: By Royal Decree (十二金牌)
- 1984: Empress Wu (武則天)
- 1984: Drunken Fist II (醉拳王無忌第二輯日帝月后)
- 1984: Jade Bow Connection (雲海玉弓緣)
- 1985: Spiritual Marginal (靈界邊緣人)
- 1985: Stardust Memories (阮玲玉)
- 1985: The Legendary Prime Minister – Zhuge Liang (諸葛亮)
- 1985: Ten Brothers (十兄弟)
- 1985: Five Beauties (群芳頌)
- 1986: Super Stuntman (狮王之王)
- 1986: Full House Year (滿堂紅)
- 1986: The Adventures (冒險家樂園)
- 1986: The Boy Fighter from Heaven (哪吒)
- 1986: Condor in September (九月鷹飛)
- 1987: Stardust Dream (紅塵)
- 1987: Adventure in Paradise (香港情)
- 1987: The Duel (武林故事)
- 1987: A Royal Affair (當皇帝愛上殭屍)
- 1987: Genghis Khan (成吉思汗)
- 1988: Master of Mount Wu Tang (武當之巔)
- 1988: Legend of Ms. Choi Kam Fa (賽金花)
- 1988: Bandits from Hong Kong (張保仔)
- 1989: Shivering Night (夜琉璃)
- 1989: Dream of Paradise (天堂夢)
- 1989: The Vampire Detective (殭屍神探)
- 1989: The Righteous Cop (男大當差)
- 1989: The Legend of Fu Hung Suet (傅紅雪傳奇)
- 1989: Immortal Love (我的野蠻殭屍女友)
- 1989: Master of Mount Wu Tang II (武當之巔之二 崑崙第一刀)
- 1989: Father & Son (兜亂兩仔爺)
- 1989: The P.I. On Call (妙探出租)
- 1989: (安樂茶飯)
- 1989: Fun Time (吳耀漢攪攪震 or 六星級攪攪震)
- 1990: The Street Market Ninja (街市忍者)
- 1990: The Merciless Law (法本無情)
- 1990: The Blood Sword (中華英雄)
- 1990: Housekeeper, My Honey (樓下伊人)
- 1991: The Good, the Ghost and the Cop (隔離差館有隻鬼)
- 1991: Rebuilding Prosperity (再造繁榮)
- 1992: Shanghai Godfather (再見黃埔灘)
- 1992: Vampire Hero (殭屍英雄)
- 1992: Mythical Crane, Magic Needle '92 (仙鶴神針)
- 1993: Shanghai Godfather II (再見黃埔灘 II 之再起風雲)
- 1993: The Silver Tycoon (銀狐)
- 1993: The Legendary Poet (青蓮居士)
- 1993: The Master of War (孫子兵法)
- 1993: Vampire Cops (偵探殭屍)
- 1993: Reincarnated II (天蠶變之再與天比高)
- 1994: The Movie Tycoon (戲王之王)
- 1994: Bays of Being Parents (可憐天下父母心)
- 1994: Beauty Pageant (鳳凰傳説)
- 1994: Vampire Magistrate (殭屍與律師)
- 1994: The Odd Couple (拿破崙與小殭屍)
- 1994: Secret Battle of the Majesty (君臨天下)
- 1994: Outlaw Hero (法外英雄)
- 1994: The Kung Fu Master
- 1995: Justice Junior (九品芝麻官)
- 1995: Vampire Expert (殭屍道長)
- 1995: Justice Pao (a.k.a. Judge Bao) (包青天)
- 1995: Shanghai Godfather III (再見黃埔灘 III 之殭屍天下)
- 1995: Fist of Fury (精武門)
- 1995: The Young Master (少年韓非子之長江後浪推前浪)
- 1995: Vampire Hero II (殭屍大俠)
- 1995-1996: Wong Fei Hung Series (黃飛鴻新傳)
- 1996: I Have a Date with Spring (我和春天有個約會)
- 1996: The Little Vagrant Lady (飃零燕)
- 1996: Outlaw Hero II (法外英雄II之生死鬥)
- 1996: The Kung Fu King III (功夫之王 III 十大天王)
- 1996: The Good Old Days (再見艷陽天)
- 1996: King of Gamblers (千王之王重出江湖)
- 1996: Vampire Expert II (殭屍道長II)
- 1996: Tales From The Dorms (坊間故事之甘戴綠頭巾)
- 1997: The Little Vagrant Lady II (飃零燕 II 之孤星淚)
- 1997: Year of Chameleon (97變色龍)
- 1997: Coincidentally (等著你回來)
- 1997: Legend of the Vampire (殭屍的故事)
- 1997: I Have a Date with Summer (我和夏天有個約會)
- 1997: The Comeback (等著香港回來)
- 1997: The Pride of Chaozhou (我來自潮州)
- 1997: Gold Rush (著數一族)
- 1998: Thou Shalt Not Cheat (呆佬賀壽)
- 1998: The Vampire Anthologies (殭屍的寓言)
- 1998: The Heroine of the Yangs (穆桂英大破天門陣)
- 1998: The Little Vagrant Lady III (飃零燕 III 之悲慘世界)
- 1998: Heroine of the Yangs II (穆桂英 II 十二寡婦征西)
- 1998: I Come From Guangzhou (我來自廣州)
- 1998: My Date with a Vampire (我和殭屍有個約會)
- 1999: Ten Tigers of Canton (廣東十虎) co-produced with the Sanlih Network from Taiwan
- 1999: Flaming Brothers (縱橫四海)
- 1999: The Heroine of the Yangs III (穆桂英 III否極泰來)
- 1999: Young Hero Fong Sai Yuk (少年英雄方世玉)
- 2000: Divine Retribution (世紀之戰)
- 2000: I was Born in Beijing (我來自北京)
- 2000: My Date with a Vampire 2 (我和殭屍有個約會II)
- 2000: Showbiz Tycoon (影城大亨)
- 2000: Wonder Bar (快活谷)
- 2000: Anywhere But Here (妳想的愛)
- 2000: Battlefield Network (電視風雲)
- 2001: To Where He Belongs (縱橫天下)
- 2001: Outlaw Hero: The Next Generation (新法外英雄)
- 2001: Healing Hearts (俠骨仁心)
- 2001: Thank You Grandpa (祖先開眼)
- 2002: Mission in Trouble (雄心密令)
- 2004: Asian Heroes (亞洲英雄)
- 2004: My Date with a Vampire 3 – the Eternal Legend (我和殭屍有個約會III之永恆國度)
- 2005: Happy Family (喜有此理)
- 2005: Central Affairs (情陷夜中環)
- 2006: Central Affairs 2 (情陷夜中環 2)
- 2006: Tales of Walled Village (大城小故事)
- 2006: Relentless Justice (AKA No Turning Back) (義無反顧)
- 2006: Fox Volant of the Snowy Mountain (雪山飛狐)
- 2008: Flaming Butterfly (火蝴蝶)
- 2010: The Men of Justice (法網群英)
- 2010: Who's the Hero (勝者為王)
- 2010: Hong Kong Go Go Go (香港GoGoGo)
