= My Date with a Vampire II =

Hong Kong drama television series

- DVD / VCD cover art
- Genre: Fantasy, jiangshi, romance
- Written by: Chan Sap-sam
- Directed by: Chan San-hap; Ng Kam-yuen; Sin Chi-wai; Wong Wai-kit; Chan Kwok-wah; Tang Hin-sing; Ma Wah-kon; CHeung Kin-wai; Leung Yan-chuen; Lau Tze-fuk; Leung Kwok-kun; Lau Wai-sing
- Starring: Eric Wan; Joey Meng; Kristy Yang; Kenneth Chan; Pinky Cheung; Berg Ng; Chapman To; Simon Yam; Ruby Wong; Cheung Kwok-kuen; Wong Shee-tong; Joey Leung
- Opening theme: "If We Really Do Have a Date" (假如真的有個約會) performed by Chiang Ka-ying
- Ending theme: "Love When the Earth is Destroyed" (愛在地球毀滅時) performed by Lee Kwok-cheung
- Composer: Yukie Nishimura
- Country of origin: Hong Kong
- Original language: Cantonese
- No. of episodes: 43

Production
- Producer: Sin Chi-wai
- Production location: Hong Kong
- Running time: 45 minutes per episode
- Production company: ATV

Original release
- Network: ATV Home
- Release: 6 March – 30 April 2000

Related
- My Date with a Vampire (1998); My Date with a Vampire III (2004)

My Date with a Vampire II
- Traditional Chinese: 我和殭屍有個約會II
- Simplified Chinese: 我和僵尸有个约会II
Transcriptions
Standard Mandarin
- Hanyu Pinyin: Wǒ Hé Jiāngshī Yǒu Gè Yuēhuì Èr
Yue: Cantonese
- Jyutping: Ngo5 Wo4 Goeng1 Si1 Jau5 Go3 Joek3 Wui6 Ji6

My Date with a Vampire II is a 2000 Hong Kong television series produced by Asia Television (ATV) as a sequel to My Date with a Vampire (1998) even though it is a reboot of the original. It was followed by My Date with a Vampire III in 2004. The series starred many cast members from the first season in similar roles. Like the first season, My Date with a Vampire II also blends aspects of the Chinese "hopping" corpses of jiangshi fiction with those of western vampires, while incorporating elements of Chinese mythology, modern horror legends, and eschatology.

== Plot ==
The second season opens with a duel between Fong Kwok-wah, a Chinese guerrilla fighter, and Yamamoto Kazuo, a major of the Imperial Japanese Army, during the Second Sino-Japanese War as shown in the first season. They attract the attention of Cheung-San, the progenitor of all vampires, who interrupts their duel. Just as Cheung-San is about to bite the two men and turn them into vampires, sorceress Ma Dan-na appears and drives Cheung-San away, thus sparing Fong and Yamamoto from their fates. Shortly after that, Fong agrees to help Ma hunt down and destroy Cheung-San. They succeed in trapping Cheung-San but he breaks free and bites Fong and the boy Fuk-sang, turning them into vampires.

Fong and Fuk-sang are still alive in the present-day (2000) and their physical appearances have not changed since more than 60 years ago. Before Fong became a vampire, he had already started a family so he now has a grandson, Tin-yau. After Tin-yau dies in an incident in the United Kingdom, Fong takes over his grandson's identity. He meets and starts a romance with Ma Siu-ling, a descendant of Ma Dan-na and the heiress to the Ma clan, who have dedicated themselves to ridding the world of evil supernatural beings.

Nüwa, the goddess who created humankind in Chinese mythology, feels very disappointed and heartbroken after seeing how her creations have been corrupted by evil, so she plans to end the world on 2 January 2001. Cheung-San, who has lived long before the world came into existence, is in love with Nüwa. Fong, Ma and their allies learn about Nüwa's plan and intend to stop her from ending the world. However, that brings them into conflict with not only the goddess herself, but also Cheung-San and his followers.

== Vampires ==
See My Date with a Vampire#Vampires for a description of the vampires depicted in this television series.

== Cast ==
- Eric Wan as Fong Kwok-wah (況國華), the protagonist who was formerly a Chinese guerrilla fighter during the Second Sino-Japanese War before he was bitten by Cheung-San and became a second-generation vampire with superhuman speed as his special power. He takes on the identity of his grandson, Fong Tin-yau (況天佑), after the latter is killed in the United Kingdom.
  - Eric Wan also portrayed Fong Chung-tong (況中棠), Fong Kwok-wah's previous incarnation as a general serving under Qin Shi Huang.
- Joey Meng as Ma Siu-ling (馬小玲), the heiress to the Ma clan and Fong Tin-yau's lover.
- Joey Meng also portrayed Ma Dan-na (馬丹娜), Ma Siu-ling's grandaunt and predecessor.
  - Joey Meng also portrayed Ma Ling-yi (馬靈兒), Ma Siu-ling's previous incarnation and founder of the Ma clan who served as a sorceress under Qin Shi Huang.
- Simon Yam as Cheung-San (將臣), the primary antagonist and progenitor of all vampires. Having lived long before the world came into existence, he is in love with Nüwa and would do anything to protect her from harm. At one point, he disguised himself as a normal man, Keung Chan-tso (姜真祖), in order to better understand human nature.
- Ruby Wong as Nüwa (女媧), the goddess who created humankind in Chinese mythology. She decides to end the world after seeing how people have been corrupted by evil.
- Angie Cheong as Ma Ding-dong (馬叮噹), Ma Siu-ling's aunt and Ma Dan-na's niece. She had a romantic relationship with Geung Chan-tso at one point without knowing that he was actually Cheung-San.
- Kristy Yang as Wong Jan-jan (王珍珍), Ma Siu-ling's close friend who starts a romantic relationship with Sze-to Fan-yan.
  - Kristy Yang also appears in flashbacks as Yamamoto Yuki (山本雪), Yamamoto Kazuo's wife.
- Kenneth Chan as Yamamoto Kazuo (山本一夫), a major of the Imperial Japanese Army and Fong Kwok-wah's rival. Although he committed suicide, a younger clone of him had been accidentally created and continues to live on as Sze-to Fan-yan (司徒奮仁), who becomes a second-generation vampire later after Cheung-San bites him.
- Cheung Kwok-kuen as Ho Fuk-sang (何復生), a boy who was bitten by Cheung-San and became a second-generation vampire with the special ability to temporarily change people's appearances.
- Wong Shee-tong as Ho Ying-kau (何應求), a sorcerer who is an ally of Ma and Fong. He is the successor of Mo Siu-fong, the protagonist in Vampire Expert.
- Chapman To as Kam Ching-chung (金正中), Ma Siu-ling's apprentice who starts a romance with the ghost Sadako.
- Pinky Cheung as Kam Mei-loi (金未來), a distant relative of Kam Ching-chung. She falls in love with Domoto Sei, who bites her and turns her into a fourth-generation vampire to save her life after she is mortally wounded. Her special power allows her to fire bullets from her fingers.
- Berg Ng as Domoto Sei (堂本靜), Yamamoto's maternal grandson who, after being bitten by Lei Wai-si, becomes a third-generation vampire with the special power to enter people's dreams. He starts a romance with Kam Mei-loi and has a son, El Niño, with her.
- Joey Leung as Domoto El Niño (堂本厄爾尼諾), Domoto Sei and Kam Mei-loi's son. As he is the offspring of two vampires, he is born with supernatural powers, including extraordinarily high intelligence. He helps Fong and Ma open the Pangu Tomb, which contains a secret weapon that can destroy Nüwa.
- Sin Ho-ying as Peacock (孔雀), a Japanese Buddhist monk from Mount Kōya in Japan.
- Saeki Hinako as Fujihara Sadako (藤原貞子), a vengeful ghost trapped in a computer network by Crow and forced to kill 3,000 people to fulfil a curse.
- Wong Mei-fan as Yuen Mung-mung (阮夢夢), Wong Jan-jan and Ma Siu-ling's neighbour.
- Lau Shek-yin as Unlucky Ghost (倒楣鬼), a ghost who brings bad luck to those around him.
- Chan Wai-ming as Small Mi (小咪), one of Fuk-sang's pet cats who can take on human form after consuming a magic pearl by accident.
- Juliana Yiu as Big Mi (大咪), one of Fuk-sang's pet cats who, like Small Mi, can take on human form.
- Tse Kwan-ho as Larry, a vampire who owns an ancient castle in England. He turns out to be Qin Shi Huang, who got his wish to be immortal when Xu Fu bit him and turned him into a vampire centuries ago.
- Belinda Hamnett as Si-nga (詩雅), Larry's fiancée who became a fourth-generation vampire 50 years ago after Larry bit her to save her life when she was mortally wounded.
- Ricky Chan as Keanu (奇諾), one of Blue Strength's henchmen. He is actually Xu Fu (徐福), the alchemist sent by Qin Shi Huang to find the key to immortality. He found Cheung-San, who bit him and turned him into a second-generation vampire.
- Yip Leung-choi as Reeves (李維斯) / Crow (烏鴉), one of Blue Strength's henchmen. 400 years ago, he was bitten by Cheung-San and became a second-generation vampire.
- Ma Chung-tak as Blue Strength (藍大力), one of the Five Colours Ambassadors who represents power.
- Wong Ngoi-yiu as Red Wave (紅潮), one of the Five Colours Ambassadors who represents confusion.
- Elena Kong as Black Rain (黑雨), one of the Five Colours Ambassadors who represents wrath.
- Yoko Wong as White Vixen (白狐), one of the Five Colours Ambassadors who represents obsession and has the ability to travel through time. She disguises herself as a woman named Pak Sum-mei (白心媚).
- Lee Yun-kei as Sunny, Fong's colleague in the police force. He turns out to be Yellow (黃子), one of the Five Colours Ambassadors who represents envy.
- Asuka Higuchi as Ming-yat (明日), a mysterious lady who reveals that Pangu is actually a clan of divine beings who are also first-generation vampires.
- Lam Chi-ho as Yau Chi-kit (游志傑), the vice CEO of an IT company and Ma Siu-ling's ex-classmate.
- Lee Fei as Jenny, a vampire who serves under Larry.
- Cheng Syu-fung as Lau Hoi (劉海), Fong's boss in the police force.
- Chung Yeung as Peter, Ma Ding-dong's university classmate who was killed by Cheung-San and had his soul trapped inside a mirror.
- Maggie Wong as Mary, Chu Wing-fuk's daughter and Fuk-sang's classmate.
- Philip Keung as Chu Wing-fuk (朱永福), Pak Sum-mei's fiancé who turns out to be a serial killer who murdered all his former lovers in order to seize their inheritance/fortune for himself.

== See also ==
- List of vampire television series
