= Chan Lai-wun =

Hong Kong actress

Chan Lai-wun (Chinese: 陳麗雲; born 21 August 1939), also known as Sister Lai-wun (麗雲姐), is a Hong Kong actress. She was formerly an artiste for Rediffusion, Asia Television and TVB. She has also filmed TV dramas for the Television Department of Radio Television Hong Kong and ViuTV. On April 19, 2009, at the age of 70, Chan Lai-wun won the Best Supporting Actress Award at the 28th Hong Kong Film Awards for her role as "Leung Foon" (梁歡) in the Hong Kong film The Way We Are (天水圍的日與夜) directed by Ann Hui.

In 1951, Chan joined Rediffusion (麗的呼聲) as an announcer, in 1966 she joined Rediffusion Wired Vision (麗的映聲) as an artiste, in 1981 she joined Rediffusion Television (麗的電視), in 1982 she worked for TVB (無綫電視), in 1983 she returned to Asia Television (亞洲電視; ATV), in 1985 she left ATV after her contract expired, in 1988 she returned to ATV. She has served ATV for 15 years. She is an actress with superb acting skills. She has acted in dozens of TV series and made great contributions to ATV. Her classic works include Family Business (冬日驕陽), The Heroine of the Yangs (穆桂英), The Rise and Fall of Qing Dynasty (滿清十三皇朝), The Pride of Chaozhou (我來自潮州), My Date with a Vampire (我和殭屍有個約會), Light of Million Hopes (萬家燈火), Today in Court (今日法庭), Hong Kong Go Go Go (香港GoGoGo) and Central Affairs (情陷夜中環). At the end of 2003, Chan left ATV, where she had worked for 15 years. In 2005, Chan returned to ATV for the fourth time and remained with the program until April 2009. In October 2010, she returned to Asia Television for the fifth time and left when his contract expired in 2013. In addition, Chan has also filmed TV series for the Hong Kong Radio Television Department and ViuTV.

== Early life ==
According to a radio interview with Chan, she had only attended kindergarten classes at the Kindergarten Section of Saint Clare's Primary School with her sister in 1948 at the age of nine, after which she received no formal education.

Her sister is Vera Waters (華慧娜), who later became a trainee at the TVB actor training course. Later she joined the MLM company NuSkin to become the MLM leader.

== Career ==
Back in the Rediffusion era, in 1951, at the age of 12, she was an announcer for children's radio dramas. She then worked as a behind-the-scenes staff member, responsible for copying scripts, at 5 cents per copy. She then became a screenwriter and wrote more than 300 scripts. Her first radio drama was the 30-episode script "Aunt" (姑媽), with Tam Ping Man (譚炳文) as the male lead. Because of her overflowing talent, Chan earned the reputation of "Rediffusion Talented Woman" (麗的才女).

She joined Rediffusion in 1951 and performed her first radio play, Who Won the Prize (是誰得獎). In 1966, she moved to Rediffusion Wired Vision and her first singing show was "Rediffusion Music" (麗的歌壇). "Young Couple" (小夫妻) was her first TV drama and later "Wong Lo Ng" (王老五) was her first time to play the leading role. Meanwhile, Chan also participated in the screenwriting work. She adapted the Cantonese opera "Lady Zhaojun Crossed the Frontier" (昭君出塞) and created "Wang Zhaojun" (王昭君), which may be the first Cantonese opera short play sung in English in Hong Kong history. She also played the lead role, Wang Zhaojun. In the 1970s, Chan also wrote scripts and lyrics for the program "Rediffusion Opera" (麗的歌劇). In 1981, Chan joined Rediffusion Television. In 1982, he joined TVB. She joined Asia Television (ATV) in 1983, left after her contract expired in 1985. She returned to ATV in 1988. At the end of 2003, her 15-year contract with ATV has not been renewed after it expired. In 2005, Chan returned to ATV for the fourth time. In April 2009, Chan left ATV for the fourth time. In October 2010, she returned to ATV for the fifth time until her contract expired in 2013. In addition, Chan has also filmed TV series for the Radio Television Hong Kong (RTHK) and ViuTV.

On April 19, 2009, at the age of 70, Chan Lai-wun won the Best Supporting Actress Award at the 28th Hong Kong Film Awards for her role as "Leung Foon" in the Hong Kong film "The Way We Are" directed by Ann Hui.

Chan has worked in different jobs over the years, such as being a backstage singer for Chan Chun Wah (陳振華), Elaine Chow (周秀蘭), Irene Chan (陳依齡) and Michelle Yim (米雪). She has also worked as a screenwriter, performed in radio dramas, taught makeup, and published a collection of proses as a writer. She is knowledgeable and versatile, and occasionally makes guest appearances in movies. The rest of the time she does volunteer work.
