= Vampire Controller =

2001 Hong Kong film by Tony Leung

- DVD cover
- Traditional Chinese: 趕屍先生
- Simplified Chinese: 赶尸先生
- Hanyu Pinyin: Gǎn Shī Xiān Shēng
- Jyutping: Gon2 Si1 Sin1 Saang1
- Directed by: Tony Leung
- Screenplay by: Tony Leung
- Produced by: Tony Leung
- Starring: Gallen Lo; Wayne Lai; Kathy Chow; Joey Meng; Yuen Wah; Kingdom Yuen
- Cinematography: Yip Wai-ying
- Edited by: Ng Wan-hung
- Music by: Simon Leung; Tony Tam
- Production companies: Times Production; Universe Entertainment; Matrix Productions
- Distributed by: Universe Films Distribution
- Release date: 8 February 2001
- Running time: 91 minutes
- Country: Hong Kong
- Language: Cantonese
- Box office: HK$16,689

Vampire Controller is a 2001 Hong Kong action comedy horror film produced, written and directed by Tony Leung and starring Gallen Lo, Wayne Lai, Kathy Chow, Joey Meng, Yuen Wah and Kingdom Yuen. The film is considered a throwback of the jiangshi fiction-genre films popularized in the 1980s by Mr. Vampire.

== Plot ==
According to legends, corpse handlers Mo (Wayne Lai) and Ma Siu-ling (Kingdom Yuen) were in charge of looking after a group of vampires. Among the vampires, Wong Ching (Jude Poyer) and Jenny (Emana Leung) were a pair of lovers who were poisoned to death. The imperial government is still tracking the killer. Since the killer was worried that his crimes will be brought to light, he hires black magician Ha Lai-cheuk (Yuen Wah) to destroy the corpses. However, this case involves a secret letter written by the emperor, thus, Ha orders his followers, Mo and Ma to find the whereabouts of the letter.

Mo and Ma were never fond of one another. In order to get his job done, Ha secretly alienates them from one another and causes internal conflict between the two.

At this time, Mo's disciple, John Lui (Gallen Lo), and Ma's goddaughter, Tin-kei (Kathy Chow) meet and fall in love at first sight. On the way, John meets Japanese spy Kindaiichi (Joey Meng), whom is fascinating and charming. Kimdaiichihas a unique behavior but she also has a soft spot for John and dispute arises among the love triangle of John, Tin-kei and Kimdaiichi.

On the other hand, Mo and Ma vows to battle to the death despite the dissuasion of others. As a result, destruction was caused to both sides, being defeated and they both die. Seeing her godmother die, Tin-kei gives up the love of her life and leaves feeling dejected. John also leaves the group of vampires behind and leaves. Ha succeeds in his treacherous plan and gets the opportunity to execute his plan to destroy the corpses of Wong Ching and Jenny. Unexpected to Ha, Mo and Ma turn his scheme against him and disguised themselves as vampires for Ha to appear in his wizard form, and they begin a battle.

John, however, was mistakenly struck by Ha with gu, but was rescued by Tin-kei. While recovering, John accidentally makes love with Kimdaiichi, whom have been attentively caring for him during the recovery period. At this time, Jenny also gives birth to a ghost child, which according to the Hunyun Scripture, will bring disaster to the world.

== Cast ==
- Gallen Lo as John Lui
- Wayne Lai as Professor Mo
- Kathy Chow as Tin-kei
- Joey Meng as Kindaiichi
- Yuen Wah as Ha Lai-cheuk
- Kingdom Yuen as Ma Siu-ling
- Emana Leung as Jenny
- Jude Poyer as Wong Ching
- Cheng Ka-sang as Mo Tung-tung
- Leung Pui-yee as Lady who trades coins with little beggar
- Lok Wai-kuen as Lian Kan-yao
- Chan Chung-wai as Coroner

== Box office ==
The film grossed HK$16,689 at the Hong Kong box office during its theatrical run from 8 to 21 February 2001.
