= Berg Ng =

Hong Kong actor (born 1960)

- Born: Ng Yuk-to (simplified Chinese: 吴玉寿; traditional Chinese: 吳玉壽; pinyin: Wú Yùshòu); 12 December 1961 (age 64); Hong Kong
- Education: high school, Hong Kong
- Occupation: Actor
- Years active: 1984–present

Berg Ng Ting-yip (born 12 December 1961) is a Hong Kong actor. He is best known for his role as Inspector Cheung in the 2002 crime thriller film Infernal Affairs.

After leaving Asia Television Limited, he went north to develop his career. In 2019, he returned to Hong Kong to take care of his elderly mother.

== Filmography ==
=== Television ===
- The Undercover Agents (1984)
- 101 Citizen Arrest III (1984)
- Ten Brothers (1985)
- Buddha Jih (1985)
- The Legendary Prime Minister – Zhuge Liang (1985)
- Genghis Khan (1987)
- The Rise and Fall of Qing Dynasty 2 (1988)
- The Legendary Hero (1990)
- Fist of Fury (1995) - Lau Chi Ching
- My Date with a Vampire (1998) - Ken
- My Date with a Vampire 2 (1999) - Shizu Domoto
- The Legendary Siblings (1999) - Du Sha
- Battlefield Network (2000) - Fok Wai Leung
- Showbiz Tycoon (2000) - Tsui Pak
- My Date with a Vampire 3 (2004) - Mr X
- The Men of Justice (2010)
- Infernal Affairs (TVB adaptation version) (2018) - as Inspector Cheung
- The Defected (2019)

=== Film ===
Year	Title	Role	Notes
1989	The Truth - Final Episode		aka The Truth Final Episode
1991	Beyond's Diary	obnoxious car owner	
1992	Something Incredible - Blood Curse		
1992	Something Incredible - Love Not for Me		
1992	Something Incredible - Presumed Guilty		
1992	Something Incredible - Return of Devil		
1993	Hong Kong Eva		
1993	Kidnap of Wong Chak Fai	Cheng Sau-chi	
1994	Yuppies Love		
1996	Big Bullet	Inspector Guan	
1996	Once Upon a Time in Triad Society 2	Bullet	
1997	We're No Bad Guys	Golden Teeth	aka We Are No Bad Guys
1998	The Protector		
1998	The Legends of Pearl River		
1998	Casino	Big Head	
1998	Extreme Crisis	cocky traffic superintendent	
1998	Operation Billionaires	Yip Sai-koon / Cyclone	aka Operation Billionaire
1999	Erotic Nightmare		
1999	The Rules of the Game	Nasty Hon	
2000	High K	Chan Siao	
2000	When a Man Loves a Woman	Officer Wong	
2001	You Shoot, I Shoot	Curry Samosa	
2001	Killing End	Naja	
2002	Heartbreak Motel	Happy	
2002	Infernal Affairs	Inspector Cheung	
2003	Colour of the Truth	Bun	
2003	Infernal Affairs III	Inspector Cheung	
2004	2046	Wan's party friend	
2005	Set to Kill	Tai Gor	
2005	Election	Senior Inspector Tou	
2006	Heavenly Mission	Kwan	
2007	Eye in the Sky	Shan's Gang Member	
2008	Fate	Lung / Ghost	
2008	Tactical Unit Human Nature	Kong	
2009	Vengeance	Crow	
2012	The Great Magician	Chang Hsien's assistant	
2013	The Grandmaster		
2013	The White Storm	Wong Shun-yik	
2017	A Security of the Ming Dynasty 2		
