= Chow Tsz-ying =

Hong Kong actress and model (born 1991)

- 周梓盈
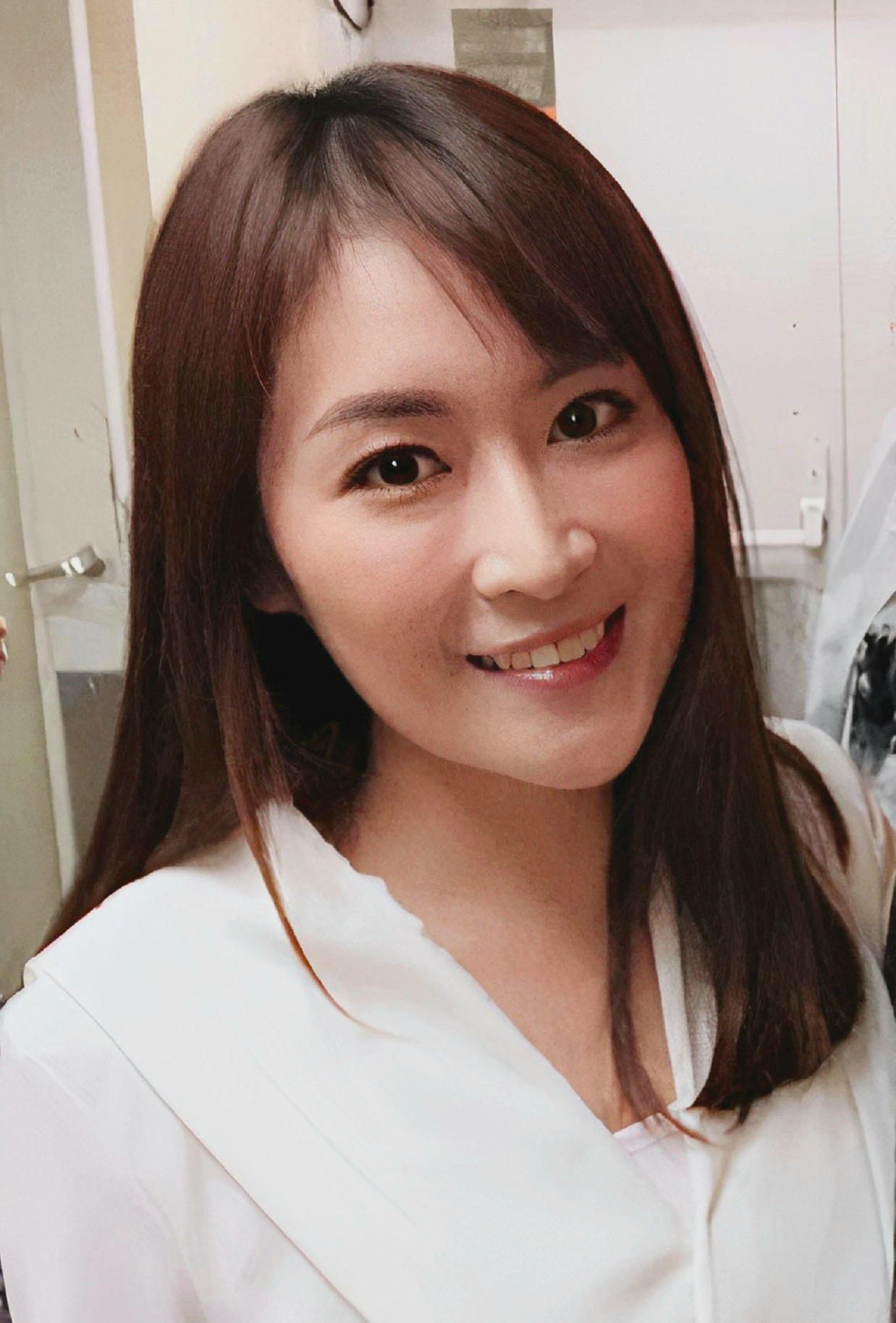
- Chow in 2018
- Born: 19 November 1991 (age 34)

Ice / Phoebe Chow Tsz-ying (Chinese: 周梓盈; born 19 November 1991) is a Hong Kong actress and model. She was an artist under the TVB Basic Artist Contract and has since retired from acting and left the Hong Kong entertainment industry.

== Life and career ==
Chow was born on 19 November 1991. According to the Sky Post, she closely resembles the actress Joey Meng. Soon after turning 18 years old, Chow signed as a model. In 2011, she gave up her interest in beauty for the sake of her future. While studying business administration at a junior college, she joined the modeling group "link-yue Donut" under the stage name "Ice". She participated in shooting magazine product photos, teen photo albums, and singing songs. Chow departed from the television network TVB, where she had been an artist, in January 2020.
