= Ten Brothers (1985 TV series) =

- Country of origin: Hong Kong
- Original language: Cantonese
- No. of episodes: 30

Production
- Production location: Hong Kong
- Running time: 1 hour

Original release
- Network: ATV

Ten Brothers (十兄弟) is a 1985 ATV drama series produced in Hong Kong. It is the first TV series to follow the Chinese mythology story of the same name.

== Synopsis ==
The story is based on a couple who gave birth to the ten brothers. The brothers later would discover they have supernatural abilities.

== Cast ==
Cast	Role	Note
Ling Man-hoi (凌文海)	Father	
Leung Suk-zong (梁淑莊)	Mother	
Tong Ban-cheong (唐品昌)	No. 1	
Ken Lok (駱達華)	No. 2	
Ng Kong (吳剛)	No. 3	
Yeung Dak-si (楊得時)	No. 4	
Fat Lit (弗烈)	No. 5	
Eric Wan (尹天照)	No. 6	
Li Lik-kwan (李力群)	No. 7	
Berg Ng (吳廷燁)	No. 8	
Lee Hin-meng (李显明)	No. 9	
Chiang Kam (蒋金)	No. 10	
Choi Sin-yi (蔡倩兒)		
