= Astrid Chan =

Hong Kong actress and host

Astrid Chi-ching Chan
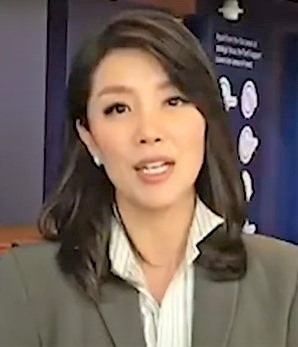
- Chan in 2018
- Born: 8 July 1969 (age 56); Tai Po, Hong Kong
- Occupations: actress and MC
- Spouse: Adonis Cheung (張錦榮) (m. 2003)
- Children: Antonia Cheung (張珈瑋)

Chinese name
- Traditional Chinese: 陳芷菁
- Simplified Chinese: 陈芷菁
Transcriptions
Standard Mandarin
- Hanyu Pinyin: Chén Zhǐjīng

Astrid Chan (born 8 July 1969 in Hong Kong) is a Hong Kong actress and host.

== Career ==
Chan was a Miss Hong Kong 1994 finalist. She acted for TVB first in the late 1990s, then switched to ATV in the early 2000s then switched back to TVB. Her notable roles were in Forensic Heroes (2006) and Marriage of Inconvenience (2007).

== Filmography ==
- That Demon Within (2014)

=== TVB Series ===
Year	Name	Role
1995	File of Justice IV	Rachel Ching Yeuk Hei (程若曦)
1995	Detective Investigation Files II	Mak Hiu Yan (麥曉欣)
1995	Forty Something	
1996	Cold Blood Warm Heart	Grace Yip (葉曉楓)
1997	File of Justice V	Rachel Ching Yeuk Hei (程若曦)
1997	A Road and A Will	
1997	The Hitman Chronicles: Jing Ke	Mrs Tsui (徐婉)
1997	The Disappearance	Cheuk Wing (卓穎)
1998	Healing Hands	Helen Ling (凌少霞)
2006	Forensic Heroes	Lam Pui Pui (林沛沛)
2007	Life Art	Kong Fung (江風)
2007	On the First Beat	Karen
2007	ICAC Investigators 2007	Michelle Wong
2007	Marriage of Inconvenience	Carol Sai (冼冰)
2008	Forensic Heroes II	Lam Pui Pui (林沛沛)
2008	Moonlight Resonance	Eliza
2010	The Mysteries of Love	Madam Koo (古玉嬌)
2011	The Other Truth	Judge Sui Heung Wong (王瑞馨)
2011	A Great Way to Care	Ho Sau-Wai (何秀惠)
2011-2012	When Heaven Burns	Gina Ma Wing Yee (馬詠儀)

=== ATV Series ===
Year	Name	Role
2000	Battlefield Network	Cheung Yuet (張月)
2000	Showbiz Tycoon	Ching Po (程波)
2001	DNA	Man Yee Chung (鍾曼怡)

== Personal ==
In 2003, Astrid married Adonis Kam Wing Cheung in the United Kingdom while pregnant with daughter, Antonia Cheung (張珈瑋).
