= Genghis Khan (TVB TV series) =

- VCD cover art
- Chinese: 成吉思汗
- Jyutping: Sing4 Gat1 Si1 Hon4
- Genre: Historical drama
- Written by: Yun Siu-na; Ka Wai-nam; Lam Siu-kei; Siu Kwong-hon
- Directed by: Lee Wai-man; Yeung Siu-hung; Wan Wai-kei; Fan Sau-ming
- Starring: Alex Man; Felix Wong; Sean Lau; Shallin Tse; Lau May-kuen
- Theme music composer: Michael Lai
- Opening theme: Who Takes the Lead (問誰領風騷) performed by Roman Tam and Jenny Tseng
- Composer: Leung Tik
- Country of origin: Hong Kong
- Original languages: Cantonese; Mongolian (dubbed)
- No. of episodes: 10 (DVD version)

Production
- Producer: Siu Sang
- Production locations: Hong Kong; Inner Mongolia
- Cinematography: Chan Tin-wing; Poon Ping-yik; Chung Kwok-keung; Mok Hon-yin
- Editors: Wu Sui-yuen; Yuen Wing-cheung
- Running time: 45 minutes per episode
- Production company: TVB

Original release
- Network: TVB Jade
- Release: 14 September 1987

Related
- Genghis Khan (ATV version)

Genghis Khan is a Hong Kong television series based on the life of Genghis Khan, the founder of the Mongol Empire in the 13th century. The series was first broadcast on TVB Jade in Hong Kong in 1987. An alternative Chinese title for the series is 大漠英雄傳 (literally: Legend of the Hero of the Desert).

== Cast ==
- Alex Man as Genghis Khan
- Felix Wong as Jamukha
- Sean Lau as Chilaun
- Eugina Lau as Heda'an
- Shallin Tse as Börte
- Eddie Kwan as Sangkun
- Nathan Chan as Hasar
- Ekin Cheng as Jochi
- Aaron Kwok as Nuoyan
- Michael Tao as Muqali
- William So as Sancha
- Ho Wai-lung as Bele
- Jim Ping-hei as Belgutei
- Chan Lai-see as Hoelun
- Chan Wing-chun as Tata-tonga
- Money Lo as Baihe
- Elizabeth Lee as A'zhen
- Lam Wai-kin as Jebe
- Au Wai-lam as Bogan
- Cheung Yik-ming as Borokhula
- Wu Wai-hong as Ercha
- Alan Chui Chung-San as Yesügei
- Yip Seung-wah as Menglike
- Lau Ya-lai as Suchi
- Ng Jui-ting as Bieke
- Yu Ming as Suo'er Laodie
- Cheung Ying-choi as Dei Setchen
- Ma Chung-tak as Dalitai
- Chun Hung as A'le
- Yu Mo-lin as Heichen

== Music ==
The opening theme song of the series, Who Takes the Lead (問誰領風騷), was originally performed in Cantonese by Roman Tam and Jenny Tseng. It was sung by Carol Cheng in the Hong Kong film Her Fatal Ways II.
