= Who Wants to Be a Millionaire (Hong Kong game show) =

Game show from Hong Kong

- Titlecard
- Original title: 百萬富翁
- Genre: Game show
- Created by: David Briggs; Steven Knight; Mike Whitehill
- Presented by: Kenneth Chan (2001–2005); Stephen Chan (2018)
- Country of origin: Hong Kong
- Original language: Cantonese

Production
- Production companies: Celador International (2001–2005); 2waytraffic International (2018)

Original release
- Network: ATV Home (2001–2005); Asia Television Digital Media (2018)
- Release: April 29, 2001 – March 20, 2005

Contestant and money tree

Fragment of the earlier edition of the show; host shows the correct order for the Fastest Finger First question

Who Wants to Be a Millionaire (Chinese: 百萬富翁; Cantonese Yale: baak3 maan6 fu3 yung1, lit. The Millionaire) is a Hong Kong game show, based on the original British format of Who Wants to Be a Millionaire?. The show's first host was Kenneth Chan. The main goal of the game is to win HK$1 million (US$129,000) by correctly answering 15 multiple-choice questions. There are three lifelines: 50:50, Phone-a-Friend and Ask-the-Audience. It first aired on April 29, 2001. It was broadcast by Hong Kong's ATV.

It is notable in ATV's 58-year history for being one of its few viewership successes over its rival station TVB.

As ATV returned broadcasting as an OTT provider in December 2017, a revival of the show was announced. The new series is hosted by Stephen Chan.

== Money Tree ==
Payout structure
Question number	Question value	
Question number	2001–2005	2018
1	$1,000	
2	$2,000	
3	$3,000	
4	$4,000	
5	$8,000	$6,000
6	$10,000	
7	$20,000	
8	$30,000	
9	$40,000	
10	$60,000	
11	$80,000	
12	$150,000	
13	$250,000	
14	$500,000	
15	$1,000,000	

== Notable Contestants ==
=== Top Prize Winners ===
- James Wong and Petrina Fung, 15 July 2001 (celebrity edition)

HK$1 million (15 of 15) – no time limit, Ask the Audience used

The Xinjiang people can enjoy their self-produced hairy crabs. From which lake are these crabs artificially bred?

1. Chaiwopu Lake (85%)(correct answer)
2. Ayding Lake (9%)
3. Lop Nur (2%)
4. Heaven Lake (4%)
- Stephen Chow and Erica Li, 21 August 2001 (celebrity edition)

HK$1 million (15 of 15) – no time limit

From which disease did western composer Chopin die of?

1. Heart attack
2. Tuberculosis(correct answer)
3. Renal failure
4. Stomach cancer
- Chan Hon-cheung (陳漢翔), 2 November 2001

HK$1 million (15 of 15) – no time limit, 50:50 used

Where is the Chinese tourist attraction Butterfly Spring located?

1. Guangdong(answer was eliminated either using the 50:50 lifeline or by choosing it while using the Double Dip lifeline)
2. Sichuan
3. Yunnan(correct answer)
4. Xinjiang(answer was eliminated either using the 50:50 lifeline or by choosing it while using the Double Dip lifeline)
- Cheng Tak-cheung (鄭德璋), 7 February 2003 (million dollar tournament)

=== Top Prize Losers (People who answered the final question incorrectly) ===
- Ling Wing Kuen (凌永權) and Ling Shuk Ling (凌淑玲), 9 November 2001 (lost HK$440,000)

HK$1 million (15 of 15) – no time limit

Which of the nine planets has only sixteen satellites?

1. Mars
2. Saturn(chosen; incorrect answer)
3. Jupiter(correct answer)
4. Uranus
- Peggy Cash and Rose Money, 1 June 2018

HK$1 million (15 of 15) – no time limit

In Thai, what does "Till La Ma" mean in Cantonese?

1. Come on(chosen; incorrect answer)
2. Do not fight
3. Play again(correct answer)
4. I do not know
