= Marriage of Inconvenience =

- Official poster
- 兩妻時代
- Genre: Modern Drama
- Starring: Bobby Au Yeung; Angela Tong; Toby Leung; Raymond Wong Ho-yin; Stephen Huynh; Winnie Young; Astrid Chan; Power Chan; Mimi Lo; Patrick Tang
- Opening theme: "沒了沒完" by Angela Tong, Toby Leung, & Patrick Tang
- Country of origin: Hong Kong
- Original language: Cantonese
- No. of episodes: 20

Production
- Running time: 45 minutes (approx.)

Original release
- Network: TVB
- Release: November 26 – December 21, 2007

Marriage of Inconvenience (Traditional Chinese: 兩妻時代) is a TVB modern drama series broadcast in November 2007, starring Bobby Au Yeung, Angela Tong and Toby Leung as the main leads.

== Synopsis ==
The owner of a marriage bureau, the candid Kong Hoi-chuen (Bobby Au Yeung), has no luck in finding a girlfriend. He meets Miu Ling (Angela Tong), who has just been disappointed in love, by chance. With his words of consolation, Ling is able to recover. Six months later, Ling agrees to marry Chuen. The marriage lasts happily for three years, husband and wife end up working in the marriage bureau in a home they adore. Just when Chuen thinks that he is the happiest husband in the world, Ling's ex-lover Ivan (Raymond Wong) returns. Several years ago Ivan left Ling because he didn't want to be 'tied down' in a relationship, but now he wants a second chance. When he meets with Ling again he kisses her, despite her resistance, and Chuen misinterprets the situation. Chuen is angry and furious, getting himself helplessly drunk in his office, and when he wakes he finds himself beside one of his clients, mainlander Ng Yi Wu-Jiu (Toby Leung). Ling sees this and, like her husband, misinterprets the situation and demands a divorce.

The divorce proceeds almost smoothly, as Cheun and Ling want out as soon as possible. Unfortunately it is not as simple as they thought. Ling, believing that she has been wronged, refuses to move out of her beloved house. Cheun, who sees the house as his, decides to arrange a fake marriage with Ng Yi Wu-Jiu. In exchange for staying at the house for free, she pretends to be his lover. The plan was that they would anger Ling enough to leave. While Cheun works on angering Ling in the house, she retaliates by hiring Ivan to work in the bureau and patroning his restaurant, which angers Cheun.

Later they learn that Ng Yi Wu-Jiu is the girl of a Triad leader. She has loyal followers and rival gangs trying to kill her. Ivan meanwhile has shown himself to be quite capable and no longer a worthless playboy, with good connections and plenty of wealth. As Chuen and Ling learn, their fighting might have involved too many unknown elements.

== Cast ==
| Cast | Role | Description |
|---|---|---|
| Bobby Au-Yeung | Kong Hoi-Chuen 江海泉 | Matchmaker; Miu Ling's husband. Ng Yi Wu-Jiu's pretend husband. |
| Angela Tong | Miu Ling (Meow Meow) 繆鈴 | Kong Hoi-Chuen's wife. Yik Hei-Ji's ex lover. |
| Toby Leung | Ng Yi Wu-Jiu 吾爾烏焦 | Kong Hoi Chuen's pretend wife. Chui Yue-Dak's lover. |
| Raymond Wong | Yik Hei-Ji (Ivan) 易晞智 | Gym Trainer; Miu Ling's ex lover. Sai Bing's lover. |
| Stephen Huynh | Tin Long 田塱 | Kong Hoi Chuen's cousin. Ng Chiu-Jing's husband. |
| Winnie Young (楊婉儀) | Yim Wun-Bik (Betty) 炎煥碧 | Doctor; Lam Pak-Sam's lover. Miu Ling's friend. |
| Astrid Chan (陳芷菁) | Sai Bing (Carol) 冼冰 | Cosmetician; Miu Ling's friend Yik Hei-Ji's lover. |
| Power Chan | Lam Pak-Sam 林柏森 | Paparazzi; Kong Hoi-Chuen's friend. Yim Wuk-Bik's lover. |
| Mimi Lo (羅敏莊) | Ng Chiu-Jing (Amy) 伍俏偵 | Kong Hoi Chuen's assistant Tin Long's wife. |
| Patrick Tang (鄧健泓) | Chui Yue-Dak (Ah Kim) 徐御德 | Gangster; Ng Yi Wu-Jiu's lover. |
| Li Ka-Sing (李家聲) | Fok Yim 霍鑑 | Client; Kong Hoi Chuen's friend. |
| Joel Chan (陳山聰) | Ho Lam 浩南 | Triad Boss; Ng Yi Wu Jiu's ex-boyfriend. |

== Viewership ratings ==
| | Week | Episode | Average Points | Peaking Points | References |
|---|---|---|---|---|---|
| 1 | November 26–30, 2007 | 1 — 5 | 27 | — | |
| 2 | December 3–7, 2007 | 6 — 10 | 27 | 29 | |
| 3 | December 10–14, 2007 | 11 — 15 | 28 | 31 | |
| 4 | December 17–21, 2007 | 16 — 20 | 28 | 30 | |

== Awards and nominations ==
41st TVB Anniversary Awards (2008)

- "Best Drama"
