= Joey Meng =

Hong Kong actress and model

- Born: British Hong Kong
- Other names: 蚊蚊 (Man Man), Man Yee Man (萬二蚊), Sap Sam Man (十三萬)
- Occupation: Actress
- Spouse: Chan Sap-sam (m. 2000)

Chinese name
- Traditional Chinese: 萬綺雯
- Simplified Chinese: 万绮雯
Transcriptions
Standard Mandarin
- Hanyu Pinyin: Wàn Qǐwén
Yue: Cantonese
- Jyutping: Maan6 Ji2-man4

Joey Meng Yee-man is a Hong Kong actress, model and beauty spokesperson. She is best known for her roles with television network ATV before moving to network TVB in 2013. Her contract with TVB ended in 2020.

== Life and career ==
After middle-school, Meng participated in the 1989 Miss Asia Pageant and emerged as first runner-up. She joined Hong Kong television station ATV on a contract that year. Meng is best known for her role as "Ma Siu-ling" in the My Date with a Vampire television series trilogy. In August 2000, she married Chan Sap-sam (the screenwriter of the My Date with a Vampire trilogy) in Las Vegas, the United States after dating for about four months.

By 2012, after over twenty years working with ATV, Meng didn't renew her contract and transferred over to ATV's competitor, TVB.

Her first television drama was Inbound Troubles, which is 2013's highest-rated television drama for the first half of the year. By February 2015, Meng completed her contract with TVB and decided not to renew for some personal time away. Due to deteriorating health, she decided to work with TVB on a per-series basis to give herself the time and freedom to choose between projects and balance personal life. She returned for one final series with TVB, 2021's Shadow of Justice, which was filmed in 2019. She officially left the network in 2020 and has resided in mainland China with her husband since her departure.

== Personal life ==
Meng is married to Robert Chan who is the creator of My Date With A Vampire.

== Filmography ==
=== Films ===
Year	Title	Role
1990	Beyond's Diary Beyond日記之莫欺少年窮	Traffic police officer
1991	Ching Mou Chan Ying Hung 精武真英雄	Wang Feng
1991	Hong Kong Criminal Archives - Female Butcher 香港奇案霧夜屠夫 ATV Movie	
1993	Mai Ching Dak Keng 迷情特警	Amei
1993	The Bride with White Hair 2	Yu Qin
1996	Those Were The Days... 慈雲山十三太保	Xiaomei
1999	Dou Meng Chin Wong 賭命千王	Man Man
1999	Century of the Dragon	Chiu Chiu
2000	Dial D for Demons	Gabriel
2000	See Chin Seung How 屍前想後	Man Man
2000	Return to Dark 改正歸邪	OK Sister
2000	A Wicked Ghost II: The Fear	Blue
2000	Romancing Bullet 浪漫鎗聲	Yu Ching
2000	Yum Fung Yi 陰風耳	Fanny
2000	Vampire Controller	Kam Tin Yat
2001	Leui Ngan Saat Sing Chi Bat Bak Lung Bing Tuen 淚眼殺星之八佰龍兵團	Mung
2002	The Troublesome Romance 麻煩三角錯	Chan Wai
2010	All About Love	Eleanor
2010	Gifts from Family	
2012	The Fairy Tale Killer	Wai

=== Television dramas ===
Year	Title	Role	Network	Awards
1989	Hey, Big Brother	Fong Siu Yuk (Hidy)	ATV	
1990	The Harvest Moon	Yiu Wai Chi (Michelle)	ATV	
1990	Happy Together	Lee Wing Lan	ATV	
1991	The Cop's Affairs	Chu Laam Laam	ATV	
1991	Who is the Winner	Cheung Ka Wai	ATV	
1992	The Butcher Schoolmaster	Wong Ka Ling	ATV	
1992	Casanova in China	Eighth/Yau Tak Lan	ATV	
1992	Spirit Of The Dragon	Fong Fei (Phoebe)	ATV	
1992	Who is the Winner II	Cheung Ka Wai (cameo)	ATV	
1993	Gamblers' Dream	Lee Man	ATV	
1993	Viva de Pilot	Wong Ka Ling (cameo)	ATV	
1993	Who is the Winner III	Kwok Ching Yung	ATV	
1993	Guns and Glory	Ngo Ming/Chan Siu Ming	ATV	
1994	Legend of the Yang Family and the Great General	Ku Siu Lin	ATV	
1994	A Cruel Lover	Tong Man Ming	ATV	
1995	Midnight Lovers	BoBo	ATV	
1995	Fist of Fury	Yumi (武田由美; Youmei)	ATV	
1996	I Have a Date with Spring	Lam Fung Ping	ATV	
1996	The Little Vagrant Lady	Yip Bo Yin (teenage)	ATV & Star TV	
1997	The Year of Chameleon	Ho Suk Yee	ATV	
1998	Thou Shalt Not Cheat	So Fung Nei	ATV	
1998	My Date with a Vampire	Ma Siu-ling and Ma Dan-na	ATV	Winner - ATV Anniversary Award for Best Actress 1999 Winner - ATV Anniversary Most Energetic On-screen Couple 1999 (With Eric Wan Tin-chiu)
1999	My Date with a Vampire II	Ma Siu-ling, Ma Dan-na, Ma Ling-yi	ATV	
2001	The New Adventures of Chor Lau-heung	Princess Yunluo	TVB	
2002	Project Ji Xiang	Dai Si Hing	ATV	
2003	Light of Million Hope	Ko Lai	ATV	
2004	My Date with a Vampire III	Ma Siu-ling	ATV	
2010	The Men of Justice	As medical examiner	ATV	
2013	Inbound Troubles	Yik Suet-fei	TVB	Nominated - TVB Anniversary Award for My Favourite Female Character
2013	A Change of Heart	Tong Sin-hang	TVB	Nominated - TVB Anniversary Award for Best Actress
2014	Gilded Chopsticks	Kei Mo-suet	TVB	
2014	Come On, Cousin	Chai Ching-man	TVB	
2014	Officer Geomancer	Che Gwai Fei	TVB	
2015	With or Without You	Jeon Zhi	TVB	
2016	Dead Wrong	Cathy Yuen Kiu	TVB	
2021	Shadow of Justice	Tsui Hei-yee	TVB	Nominated - TVB Anniversary Award for Best Actress; Nominated - TVB Anniversary Award for Most Popular Female Character; Nominated - TVB Anniversary Award for Most Popular Onscreen Partnership (with Bobby Au Yeung); Nominated - TVB Anniversary Award for Favourite TVB Actress in Malaysia
