= Be Together (film) =

- 我只要我们在一起
- Directed by: Yan Fei
- Starring: Kristy Yang; Michael Tong; Chi Shuai; Zhou Lingnan
- Production companies: Yangzhou Lingnan Cultural Development Co., Ltd; Shanghai Shanxi Entertainment Co., Ltd 浙江东阳燕南影视有限公司; Xingyue Yining（Beijing）Media Co., Ltd
- Distributed by: Shanghai Shanxi Entertainment Co., Ltd
- Release date: February 13, 2015
- Running time: 83 minutes
- Country: China
- Language: Mandarin
- Box office: CN¥2.72 million

Be Together (Chinese: 我只要我们在一起) is a 2015 Chinese romance film directed by Yan Fei. The film was released on February 13, 2015.

== Cast ==
- Kristy Yang as Ke Min
- Michael Tong
- Chi Shuai
- Zhou Lingnan

== Reception ==
By February 16, the film had earned CN¥2.72 million at the Chinese box office.
