= Stephen Chan Chi-wan =

Stephen Chan
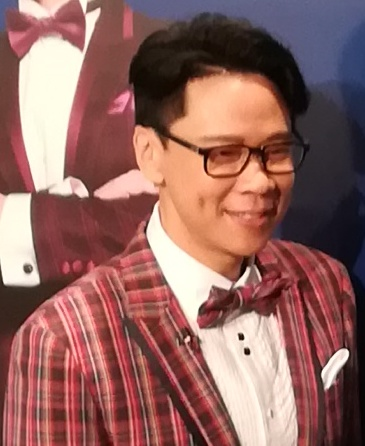
- Chan at a press conference on 2 January 2018, after filming the first episode of the celebrity edition of the "Who Wants To Be A Millionaire 2018" at the ATV Headquarters in the Tai Po Industrial Estate.
- Born: 20 December 1959 (age 66); Hong Kong
- Occupations: General manager of Television Broadcasts Limited, (2004–2013); CEO of Commercial Radio Hong Kong (2013–2015); Chief Advisor of Commercial Radio Hong Kong (2015 – )

Chinese name
- Traditional Chinese: 陳志雲
- Simplified Chinese: 陈志云
Transcriptions
Standard Mandarin
- Hanyu Pinyin: Chén Zhìyún
Yue: Cantonese
- Jyutping: can4 zi3 wan4
- Musical career
- Also known as: Vulgar Chan (韋家晴)
- Origin: Hong Kong

Stephen Chan Chi-wan (born 20 December 1958) is the Chief Advisor of Commercial Radio Hong Kong and a YouTube pundit. Chan was previously the chief executive officer of Commercial Radio Hong Kong and general manager of TVB Limited (TVB). On 9 December 2011 Chan announced his resignation as GM effective April 2013.

== Education ==
Chan studied linguistics and theatre at the University of Hong Kong and graduated in 1981.

== Career ==
=== Pre-TVB career ===
He initially joined the HK government as an Administrative Officer, in the same batch as Edward Yau. He then spent four years in London lobbying for the right of abode for Hong Kong people. In 1991 he returned to HK and served as assistant commissioner of the Television and Entertainment Licensing Authority. He was also working a part-time disc jockey position with the RTHK, when was known as "'Wai Ka Ching (Vulgar Chan)'".

=== TVB career ===
He worked at Commercial Radio Hong Kong for two years before joining TVB as a Programme Controller in 1992. He was given additional responsibilities as Controller (External Affairs) in 1995.

In April 2001, Chan was promoted to Assistant General Manager at TVB. In April 2004, he was officially made the general manager of broadcasting. His popularity increased when he began airing the show, Be My Guest, in which he interviews Hong Kong celebrities in 2006.

For the show Vanishing Glacier (台慶鉅獻: 冰天動地), he also flew to the arctic to record the impact of global warming with Sammul Chan, Bernice Liu and Kay Tse.

On 9 December 2011, Chan resigned from TVB and went to study abroad.

=== CRHK career ===
On 4 March 2013, Chan took up the post of CEO of Commercial Radio Hong Kong On 11 February 2015, Chan transferred to the post of the principal advicer.

=== Online career ===
In April 2020, Chan started a personal YouTube channel, titled Stephen Talks (志雲頻道stephenchannel). Chan would invite various celebrities, actors and singers over for singing sessions, interviews and talk shows. He gained popularity as a commentator, discussing and analyzing news, lifestyles, politics of Hong Kong as well as international affairs. As of May 2026, Chan had accumulated 310K subscribers.

Chan was also an outspoken critic of the Hong Kong entertainment industry, especially local TV. After he started his channel, Chan stated; "the age of television is behind us in the past, due to new media. If there is no competition in the small market, how is there more to survive?" In an interview with Ming Pao, Chan mentioned that he does not intend to earn a lot, but the passion and heart put into his talk show required a lot of variety. He stated that advertisement income was good enough to keep it functioning. In 2021, Chan ranked on 8th spot in the ranking of Hong Kong's hottest content creator channels.

== Personal life ==
Chan initially weighed 90 kg, and became slim when he became a vegetarian.

== Court cases ==
On 11 March 2010, Chan together with his personal assistant and 3 other employees of TVB were arrested by the ICAC. The other arrested included Wilson Chan Wing-suen, Wilson Chin Kwok-wai, Ning Jin and Edthancy Tseng Pei-kun. TVB confirmed that three of their employees were involved, and that their duties and work had been suspended pending further development. On 16 September 2010, Chan was formally charged by ICAC with corruption and conspiracy to defraud TVB.

Chan was cleared of charges relating to some activities at TVB in November 2010, but three other incidents relating to bribery and conspiracy to defraud are still being investigated. Chan resumed his TVB duties on 16 November, but his duties will not involve artist management and casting arrangement.

Chan and Edthancy Tseng were acquitted twice in 2011 and 2013. On 25 October 2015, Chan and Tseng were convicted on bribery in which a mall Olympian City paid Chan HK$112,000 through Tseng's company. Chan and Tseng's convictions were quashed by the Court of Final Appeal in March 2017.
