= Century of the Dragon =

1999 Hong Kong film by Clarence Fok

- Film poster
- Traditional Chinese: 龍在邊緣
- Simplified Chinese: 龙在边缘
- Hanyu Pinyin: Lóng Zài Biān Yuán
- Jyutping: Lung4 Zoi6 Bin1 Jyun4
- Directed by: Clarence Fok
- Screenplay by: Wong Jing
- Produced by: Wong Jing
- Starring: Andy Lau; Louis Koo; Joey Meng; Patrick Tam; Suki Kwan; Anthony Wong
- Cinematography: Edmond Fung
- Edited by: Marco Mak
- Music by: Sammy Ha; Wai Hin-kwan
- Production company: Jing's Production
- Distributed by: China Star Entertainment
- Release date: 15 October 1999
- Running time: 109 minutes
- Country: Hong Kong
- Language: Cantonese
- Box office: HK$8,313,482

Century of the Dragon is a 1999 Hong Kong crime film directed by Clarence Fok and starring Andy Lau, Louis Koo, Joey Meng and Patrick Tam.

== Plot ==
When Wong Chi-sin was training in the police academy, he achieved prominent grades which prompts Superintendent Ko to send him undercover before his graduation. After five years, Chi-sing finally gains the trust of Hung Hing Gang's most prominent leader Lung Yat-fei, known as Fei-lung Gor . One time, Fei-lung's sworn brother Tong Pau was fighting for territories with another triad boss Loan Shark Ko, which happened on the day of Fei-lung's mother's birthday party. Unknown to Pau, the police have planted undercover cop Big Head Man in his gang for many years. On that night, Pau was arrested and hospitalized due to heavy injuries.

Since Pau is seriously injured, the Hung Hing Gang forces Fei-lung, who has been dealing with legal business for the past five years, back to the underworld, to which Fei-lung refuses. Pau's son Man-chun, a ruthless man, takes the opportunity for vengeance and makes a deal with the elders that whoever is able to find the mole and kill Superintendent Ko and Loan Shark Ko, will get the opportunity to be the new leader. When Chi-sing hears of this, he decides to immediately inform Big Head Man. Since Man lost his pager, Chi-sing was unable to call him and tries to find Man in his son's school. When Chi-sing makes it there, Man has left with his son and while trying to find him everywhere, he finds Man and his son killed by Man-chun and his henchmen.

Man-chun is actually desperate to take his father's position as Hung Hing's leader and pretends to feel sad for his father and tells Chi-sing to kill Superintendent Ko, which Chi-sing neglects. Fei-lung does not want to deal with the underworld and tells Chi-sing to beware of moles around him, which makes Chi-sing feel guilty. Man-chun calls Chi-sing to negotiate with Loan Shark Man, while on the other hand orders his henchmen to sweep Ko's business and rape his wife and daughter. While Ko was negotiating with Chi-sing, he finds out that his business were all swept and his wife and daughter raped and decides to kill Chi-sing before he was rescued by Fei-lung, which makes Ko believe that Fei-lung is behind all this and decides to take revenge on him. Later, Superintendent Ko tells Chi-sing to immediately assist in arresting Fei-ung, but Chi-sing explains to Ko that Man-chun is the mastermind behind this and persuades him to arrest Man-chun instead, which leads Ko to misunderstand that Chi-sing has renegaded and detains him.

When Chi-sing's girlfriend Judy learns that Man-chun sent his top henchmen Ma Wong and Fa Fit to kidnap Fei-ung's wife Daisy, Judy immediately informs Daisy; while on the other hand, Loan Shark Ko has captured Fei-lung's mother to threaten Fei-lung to surrender, and Man-chun unexpectedly arrives and kills Ko while trapping Fei-lung, his mother and son in a farm. When Superintendent Ko finds Loan Shark Ko dead in Fei-lung's house, he lists Fei-lung as a wanted criminal.

When Chi-sing rescues Daisy, he learns that Man-chun has captured Fei-lung and his family and goes to find Man-chun in his company. While also with the help of Chi-sing, Daisy was able to avoid being raped by Man-chun and holds him hostage to the farm to rescue Fei-lung, his mother and son. However, after rescuing Fei-lung where a major gunfight occurs, Daisy was killed by Man-chun in the process.

In the end, Fei-lung decides to take revenge. When Chi-sing learns of this, he immediately rushes to stop him from this mistake. There, Fei-lung uses Chi-sing's gun to resolve Man-chun. Chi-sing shoots Man-chun for self-defense where Man-chun also falls off the building and dies.

== Cast ==
- Andy Lau as Lung Yat-fei / Fei-lung Gor
- Louis Koo as Wong Chi-sing
- Joey Meng as Judy
- Patrick Tam as Tong Man-chun
- Suki Kwan as Daisy
- Anthony Wong as Tong Pau
- Eric Wan as Big Head Man
- Paw Hee-ching as Fei-lung's mother
- Louise Lee as Wong Chi-sing's mother
- Lawrence Lau as Ken
- Frankie Ng as Ma Wong
- Lee Siu-kei as Sam
- Lung Fong as Fa Fit
- Joe Lee as Superintendent Ko
- Chung Yeung as Cole
- Steve Lee as Loan Shark Ko
- Yu Man-chun
- Fan Chin-hung as thug
- Lee To-yue as triad at meeting
- Chan Sek
- Yee Tin-hung
- Adam Chan
- Lam Kwok-kit
- Chu Cho-kuen
- Hon Ping

== Reception ==
=== Box office ===
The film grossed HK$ 8,313,482 at the Hong Kong box office during its theatrical run from 15 October to 4 November 1999 in Hong Kong.

== Critical reception ==
A review found the film was "pretty standard stuff". LoveHK film stated: "This is an entertaining enough triad movie that succeeds due to the presence of Louis Koo Tin-Lok, who should forevermore be known as HK’s new triad leading man. His intensity and charisma serve him well in this role and he manages to overshadow Andy Lau, who turns in a relatively unremarkable performance. Wong Jing does his usual work with this genre, bringing us lousy police, evil bad guys, and affecting though hackneyed plot twists. For those who like triad movies this movie is a decent watch, but it doesn’t come close to the heights of A True Mob Story, which was actually directed by Wong Jing. Clarence Fok directed this one, and it’s competently done." Another review found that although not remarkably directed nor very original the film was entertaining enough.

== See also ==
- Andy Lau filmography
- Wong Jing filmography
