= My Date with a Vampire III =

2004 Hong Kong television series

- Promotional poster
- Genre: Fantasy, jiangshi, supernatural, romance
- Written by: Chan Sap-sam; Kwok Po-yin; Chan Chi-hang; Lam Chung-bong; Au Yuk-han; Mak Yiu-kuen; Shum Si-nga; Luk Sam-sam; Leung Bui-yee; Yu Kwong-chi
- Directed by: Tam Yau-yip; Lau Kwok-fai; Cheng Wai-man; Wan Wai-kei; Tang Wai-yan; Shek Ming-cheun; Chow Ka-man; So Chi-wing; Ho Chun-wah
- Starring: Eric Wan; Joey Meng; Kenneth Chan; Pinky Cheung; Berg Ng; Cheung Kwok-kuen; Kylie Kwok; Mark Cheng; Alice Chan
- Opening theme: "Eternal Country" (永恆國度) by Kenneth Chan and Fung Ha-yin
- Country of origin: Hong Kong
- Original language: Cantonese
- No. of episodes: 38

Production
- Producers: Tam Yau-yip; Ng Gam-yuen; Lee Wai-chu; Leung Lap-yan
- Production location: Hong Kong
- Running time: 45 minutes per episode
- Production company: ATV

Original release
- Network: ATV Home
- Release: 25 October – 11 December 2004

Related
- My Date with a Vampire II

My Date with a Vampire III
- Traditional Chinese: 我和殭屍有個約會III之永恆國度
- Simplified Chinese: 我和僵尸有个约会III永恒国度
- Literal meaning: My Date with a Vampire III - Eternal Country
Transcriptions
Standard Mandarin
- Hanyu Pinyin: Wǒ Hé Jiāngshī Yǒu Gè Yuēhuì Sān Yǒnghéng Guódù
Yue: Cantonese
- Jyutping: Ngo^{5} Wo^{4} Goeng^{1} Si^{1} Jau^{5} Go^{3} Joek^{3} Wui^{6} Saam^{1} Wing^{5} Hang^{4} Gwok^{3} Dou^{6}

My Date with a Vampire III is a 2004 Hong Kong television series produced by Asia Television (ATV) as a sequel to My Date with a Vampire (1998) and My Date with a Vampire II (2000). The series starred many cast members from the first two seasons. Like the first two seasons, My Date with a Vampire III also blends aspects of the "hopping" corpses of Chinese jiangshi fiction with those of European vampires, while incorporating elements of Chinese mythology, eschatology and time travel.

== Synopsis ==
In ancient times, the immortal Fuxi desired to create a paradise called the Eternal Country in the human world. His wish, however, put him at odds with his lover, the goddess Yaochi Shengmu, because her mission is to bring death and disease upon humankind. Fuxi eventually broke up with Yaochi Shengmu and started a new relationship with Chang'e after adopting a new identity as the archer Houyi. He lost Chang'e when she flew to the moon after consuming a magic pill from Yaochi Shengmu. Fuxi blamed Yaochi Shengmu for separating him and Chang'e, and fought with his ex-lover. The immortals of the Pangu clan intervened by imprisoning Yaochi Shengmu in Heaven, while Fuxi remains in the human world.

Kuang Tianyou and Ma Xiaoling have been living in Heaven after successfully preventing Nüwa from ending the world in 2001. Three years later, Yaochi Shengmu breaks free and introduces a deadly virus to wipe out the Pangu clan. Kuang, who is infected by the virus and on the verge of dying, sends Ma back to the human world. Ma has to find ways to stop an imminent clash between Fuxi and Yaochi Shengmu because that could lead to the end of the world.

Ma travels back in time to the Song dynasty to find Kuang's previous avatar, Arrowhead, and takes him to present-day Hong Kong to help her. At the same time, she meets her family members — her parents Ma Dalong and Tang Jinbao, and her twin brother Ma Xiaohu — whom she has never seen before. She also encounters a strange girl called Kuang Tianya, who turns out to be her daughter from the future. She is eventually reunited with Kuang Tianyou.

Just as relations between Fuxi and Yaochi Shengmu start to improve, and the situation becomes more stable, Kuang, Ma, and their allies are confronted by Destiny, the entity that controls and dictates the fates of all beings in the universe. They need to overcome Destiny in order to change the fate of the world.

== Cast ==
- Eric Wan as Kuang Tianyou / Arrowhead
- Joey Meng as Ma Xiaoling
- Kenneth Chan as Wanyan Bupo / Yuan Bupo
- Mark Cheng as Fuxi / Ren Xi
- Alice Chan as Yaochi Shengmu / Yaoqiong
- Ruco Chan as He Youqiu / Mr. Heaven-Transcendent / Destiny
- Pinky Cheung as Wanyan Wulei
- Berg Ng as Mr. X
- Teresa Mak as Mao You
- Cheung Kwok-kuen as Fusheng
- Kylie Kwok as Kuang Tianya
- Ricky Chan as Ma Xiaohu / Ksitigarbha
- Tats Lau as Ma Dalong
- Mango Wong as Tang Jinbao
- Asuka Higuchi as Chang'e
- Wong Shee-tong as He Yingqiu
- Qin Lan as Yue Yinping
- Norman Chui as Yue Fei
- Remus Kam as Liuxing / Nick
- Andrew Yuen as Zaijie Jushi
- Geoffrey Wong as Mars
- William Chow as Sky
- Cheuk Wai-man as Kary
- Sin Ho-ying as Laogui
- Yen Si-yu as Big R
- Chan Lok-man as Small R
- Idea Ng as Wulong
- Yuen Man-chun as Kimura
- Vivian To as June
- Wong Oi-yiu as Lublin
- Bobby Tsang as Laoxu
- Cheng Syu-fung as Lei Wang
- Jason Pai as the Divine Dragon
- Kwan Wai-lun as Officer Chen

== See also ==
- List of vampire television series
