= Kristy Yang =

- Born: Yang Gongru; January 7, 1974 (age 52); Shanghai, China
- Education: York University
- Occupation: Actress
- Years active: 1996–present
- Partner(s): Ken Kan; Zhou Zhengyi

Chinese name
- Traditional Chinese: 楊恭如
- Simplified Chinese: 杨恭如
Transcriptions
Standard Mandarin
- Hanyu Pinyin: Yáng Gōngrú
Yue: Cantonese
- Jyutping: Joeng^{4} Gung^{1}-jyu^{4}
- Musical career
- Also known as: Gold Fish
- Origin: British Hong Kong

Kristy Yang (born 7 January 1974), also known as Yang Gongru, is a Chinese-Canadian actress based in Hong Kong.

== Early life ==
Yang was born in Shanghai, China, to a Chinese father and Jenny Liu, Chinese-American. Ms.Liu was invited to play the role in the film Shanghai 1976 (2008) and she has just known her father was an American soldier. Ms.Liu's mother had just a photo of him but in the end it's also burned in war.

Kristy grew up in a single-family as her father left the family during her childhood. In 1985, Yang immigrated to Toronto, Ontario, Canada. She has a step-brother who was born in Canada.

Kristy graduated from York University after completing her high school education in 1993 at Rosedale Heights School of the Arts in Toronto.

== Career ==
In the summer of 1995, during a trip to Hong Kong, Yang participated in the Miss Asia Pageant beauty contest organised by ATV and earned the title of "Miss Asia 1995". She also won the Miss Photogenic and Most Popular Contestant awards. Yang joined ATV and had been acting in several television dramas produced by ATV before venturing into the film industry.

== Filmography ==
=== Film ===
Year	Title	Role	Notes
1996	Comrades, Almost a Love Story 甜蜜蜜	Fong Siu-ting	Nominated – Hong Kong Film Award for Best New Performer
1997	A Queer Story 基佬四十	Gigi	cameo
1997	Love Cruise 超級無敵追女仔2狗仔雄心	Jelly	
1998	The Lucky Guy 行運一條龍	Fanny	
1998	Portland Street Blues 古惑仔情義篇之洪興十三妹	Yun	Nominated – Hong Kong Film Award for Best Supporting Actress
1998	Young and Dangerous: The Prequel 新古惑仔之少年激鬥篇	Yung	cameo
1998	The Storm Riders 風雲之雄霸天下	Charity	alternative title The Stormriders
1999	A Man Called Hero 中華英雄	Jade	
1999	The Rules of the Game 新家法	Ann	
1999	My Loving Trouble 7 我愛777	Dora Yeung	cameo
2000	I.Q. Dudettes 辣椒教室	Miss Lam	
2000	The Duel 決戰紫禁之巔	Ye Ziqing	
2000	Sexy and Dangerous 2 古惑女2	Pepper	
2000	Those Were the Days 友情歲月之山雞故事	Cheung May-yun	cameo
2000	Healing Hearts 俠骨仁心	Helen	guest star
2000	For Bad Boys Only; BAD BOY特工	Queen Chan	alternative title For Badboys Only
2001	Fall For You 喜歡你	Yi	
2001	Everyday is Valentine 情迷大話王	Mona	
2001	City of Desire 洪興十三妹之慾望之城	Kindergarten teacher	cameo
2001	The Avenging Fist 拳神	Belle	
2002	Woman From Mars 當男人變成女人	Kristy	cameo
2003	I Want to Get Married 嫁給有錢人2之我要結婚	May Chan / Linda	alternative title I Wanna Get Married
2003	Fate Fighter 賭俠之人定勝天	Fa	
2003	City of SARS 非典人生	Viola Lam	
2004	Zhuanshi Miqing 鑽石迷情	Lin Feng	
2004	The Love Winner 戀愛大贏家	Susan Chan	alternative title I Love How You Love Me
2004	A Marvelous Detective 妙探神威	Wai-ling	
2005	Gesheng Miying 歌聲迷影	Xiao Lele	alternative title Dieying Shaji (疊影殺機)
2005	PTU File - Death Trap; PTU女警	Yeung Fong-fong	
2006	The Dream of My Family 親親一家人	Ms. Mok	guest star
2006	Magic and Me 魅影迷情	Xiao Lewen	
2007	Qing Ping Guo 青蘋果	Shen Lewen	
2007	Ming Ming 明明	Zhang Yu	cameo
2007	Blessed Destiny 緣來是愛	Li Rong	
2010	Bruce Lee, My Brother 李小龍	Meiqi	
2011	Under the Influence 戒酒不戒酒		
2011	Where are You From? 你是哪裡人	Lei	
2013	Mortician		
2013	Kidnapping of a Big Star		
2013	Flash Play		
2013	Sweet Summer Love		
2015	Be Together' 我只要我们在一起		
2016	Roommates in Love		
2019	Magic Circle		
TBA	Yingxiong Meiren 英雄美人	Consort Yu	

=== Television ===
Year	Title	Role	Network	Notes
1996	King of Gamblers 千王之王之重出江湖	Ha Suet-yee	ATV	
1996	Vampire Expert II 殭屍道長2之燈蛾撲火	Yu Ying-ying	ATV	
1996	The Swordsman 劍嘯江湖	Siu-lin	ATV	
1997	Coincidentally 等着你回来	Cheung Lai-kwan	ATV	
1997	The Snow is Red 雪花神劍	Mui Kong-suet	ATV	
1997	The Pride of Chao Zhou 我來自潮州	Kong Sin-yu	ATV	
1997	Interpol 國際刑警1997		ATV	
1997	The Year of Chameleon; 97变色龙	Yeung Ling-ling	ATV	
1997	屋企有個肥大佬	Christy	ATV	guest star
1998	My Date with a Vampire 我和殭屍有個約會	Wong Jan-jan / Yamamoto Yuki	ATV	
1999	Flaming Brothers 縱橫四海	Lo Suet	ATV	
1999	The Blessed Family 情牽日月星	Le Jing		alternative title The Sun, Moon and Star
2000	My Date with a Vampire II 我和殭屍有個約會2	Wong Jan-jan / Yamamoto Yuki	ATV	
2000	Zijing Xunzhang 紫荊勛章	Feng Jiahui		
2001	Master Swordsman Lu Xiaofeng 陸小鳳之決戰前後	Sha Man	TCS	
2001	Healing Hearts 俠骨仁心	Sin Wai-nam (Helen)	ATV	
2001	To Where He Belongs 縱橫天下	Ko Hok-yau	ATV	
2001	The New Adventures of Chor Lau-heung 新楚留香	Xue Keren	TVB / CTS	
2002	Drunken Hero 大醉俠	Bai Yutong		
2002	The Monkey King: Quest for the Sutra 齊天大聖孫悟空	White Bone Demoness	TVB	
2002	Feel 100% 百分百感覺	Kristy		guest star
2002	Yiqie Cong Jiehun Kaishi 一切從結婚開始	Yang Xi		
2002	Heisha Zhiwo Xin Busi 黑煞之我心不死	Zhang Hailan		
2003	The Story of Han Dynasty 楚漢風流	Consort Yu	CCTV	alternative title The Stories of Han Dynasty
2003	Yiqi Hecai 一起喝彩	Kimmy		guest star
2003	Fenglin Ge 鳳臨閣	Li Fengjie		
2003	Wode Xiongdi Jiemei 我的兄弟姐妹	Qi Sitian		
2004	Xiaoyao Shenxian Luo Fanchen 逍遥神仙落凡尘	Mi Jia		
2004	Fengchui Yundong Xing Budong 風吹雲動星不動	Niu Fangli		
2004	Ai Yu Meng Feixiang 愛與夢飛翔	Lin		guest star
2005	Ruguo Yueliang You Yanjing 如果月亮有眼睛	Sun Huaizhen		
2006	A Beautiful New World 美麗新天地	Sam Lok-man		alternative title Love to be Found in New Here
2006	Phoenix from the Ashes 浴火鳳凰	Li Wuxia	GZTV / ATV	
2006	Baoyu Lihua 暴雨犁花	Nie Bing		
2007	Modern Beauty 男才女貌之现代美女	Lin Ziqi		alternative title Modern Lady
2007	Xin Tianxian Pei 新天仙配	Third Fairy	CCTV	guest star
2007	Dushi Niwota 都市你我他			guest star
2007	Dingjia Younü Xiyangyang 丁家有女喜洋洋	Ding Yu		
2007	Da'an Zu 大案組	Zhang Ye		
2008	Xialü Tan'an 俠侶探案	Liu Wan'er		appeared in episode 8 only
2008	Hushan Xing 虎山行	Ouyang Xue		
2009	Shanjian Lingxiang Mabang Lai 山間鈴響馬幫來	Chen Zhu		
2009	Shenmi Nüdie 神秘女諜	Liu Yefei		
2010	Song of Spring and Autumn 春秋祭	Li Ji		
2015	Legend of Ban Shu	Zhu Ding's mother		
2019	Goodbye My Princess	Princess Mingyuan		
