= Jiang Shi =

Chinese poet

Jiang Shi 江湜
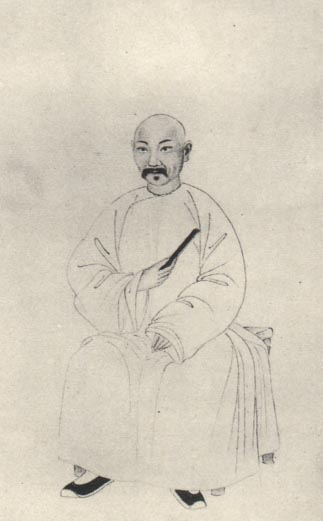
- Jiang Shi in Portraits of Qing dynasty scholars
- Born: Jiāng Shí; 1818 (208 years ago); Suzhou, Jiangsu
- Died: 1866 (aged 47–48); Hangzhou, Zhejiang
- Occupations: official, poet, calligrapher
- Writing career
- Pen name: courtesy: Chizheng (持正), Taoshu (弢叔); style: Longqiuyuan Xingzhe (龍湫院行者)
- Period: Qing dynasty
- Subjects: roaming, wandering, drifting
- Notable work: Fuyutang Poems (伏敔堂詩錄)

Jiang Shi (1818-1866) was a Chinese official and poet of the late Qing period, primarily famous for his use of simpler language within the general context of Song School poetry (Neo-Confucianism). He was also an expert in calligraphy, line drawing and Chinese brush painting.

== Life and poetry ==
Born in Suzhou, Jiangsu province, Jiang served various posts in the imperial government of Jiangsu, Shandong, Fujian and Zhejiang. Due to the Taiping Rebellion, Jiang spent quite a lot of time wandering from one place to another. This part of life experience was reflected in his roaming poems, which illustrated people's livelihood and local conditions in South China of the early 20th century, as well as social problems including the opium trade of that time. His works also voiced changes in his mentality during the drifting: Jiang gradually realised the hopelessness in an official career and eventually turned to poetry, the true means of his life.

His works are compiled in Fuyutang Poems.

== Comments ==
Jiang kept true to the real feelings in his poems, avoiding mediocrity and pursuing originality. His theoretical views on poetry did not conform to the orthodoxy of his time, and were embodied in the various styles of his poems, which in turn shaped this distinguished master of poetry.

The contemporary literary critic Qian Zhongshu saw Jiang as one of the best late-Qing poets, along with Huang Zunxian.
