= The Pride of Chaozhou =

Hong Kong television series

The Pride of Chaozhou (Traditional Chinese: 我來自潮州, Literally I am From Teochew) is a Hong Kong–style television drama series produced by Hong Kong broadcaster Asia Television (ATV) written by Leung Tin (梁天), and directed by Siu Sang (蕭笙) and Jimmy Sin Chi-wai (冼志偉). During filming, its working title was《架己冷》(Our Own People in Teochew). It premiered on ATV Home Channel from October to December 1997, starring Nathan Chan Ting‑wai (陳庭威), Stephen Au Kam-tong, and Lawrence Lau Sek‑yin (劉錫賢), with Kristy Yang, Annabelle Man Chung-han, Lee Heung‑kam, Lung Koon‑tin (龍貫天), and Wong Shu‑tong (黃樹棠) in supporting roles. Its spiritual successor is I Come from Guangzhou (我來自廣州). The copyright is currently held by The Walt Disney Company.

The series is known for its depiction of the unique culture of Teochew. It is also considered to be a semi-autobiography of Lim Por-yen, owner and CEO of ATV at the time, being a Teochew native, hence it was rebroadcast after Lim's death.

== Synopsis ==
The series revolves around the Teochew area as well as Hong Kong, where the main protagonists continued their career after the establishment of the People's Republic of China. It took place during World War II, the late Republican era in China. Cheng Sum (鄭琛, played by Chan Ting‑wai), Lee Lai Keung (李乃強, played by Stephen Au Kam‑tong), and Chu Yun (朱潤, played by Lawrence Lau Sek‑yin) are sworn brothers from the same village in Chaozhou. Cheng Sum's father is a well‑to‑do local merchant, and the Zheng family enjoys great prestige in the region. Even as a young man, Cheng Sum showed exceptional strategic talent and courage. When bandits ravaged the Chaozhou area for a decade, he devised a plan that drove them away. He later upheld justice by resolving the long‑standing feud between Upper Lian Village and Lower Lian Village. After Liberation, famine struck the Chaozhou region, prompting Cheng Sum, Lee Lai Keung, Chu Yun, and others to head to Hong Kong to seek a new life. When they first arrive, the three are so poor they can barely survive, yet they refuse to lose heart. Starting from the bottom, they work step by step, enduring hardship after hardship. In time, each achieves remarkable success: Cheng Sum becomes a leading figure in Hong Kong's garment industry; the upright and incorruptible Lee Lai Keung, after weathering the anti‑corruption storm, finally secures his footing within the police force; and Chu Yun rises to become a major player in the chain‑restaurant business. Their struggles and achievements mirror the development of Hong Kong itself.
