= R by R =

Hong Kong television production company

R by R Production Limited is a production company based in Hong Kong that produces a weekly television travel show set in Japan.

JP Time TV (Japanese: 日語大放送) was first shown on ATV World on 2 October 2005 and later also repeated on ATV Asia (ATV's HD channel) beginning in May 2009. JP Time TV ended its run on 27 March 2016, days before Asia Television Limited's terrestrial television broadcasting license expired on 2 April the same year.

A replacement show with a new name, Go! Japan TV (Japanese: 日本大放送), debuted on 17 April 2016 on ViuTV.

The show is mainly presented in Japanese but also features occasional Cantonese dialogues. As the show moved to ViuTV, such version is available on the channel's secondary audio track; the main audio track features the dialogues fully translated and dubbed in Cantonese.

R by R Publishing Limited, a sister company to R by R Production, publishes Go! Japan, a monthly travel magazine published in Hong Kong that began in November 2012.
