= Battlefield Network =

Hong Kong television series

- Official poster
- 電視風雲
- Genre: Drama
- Screenplay by: Shek Hoi-ting; Yip Tin-shing; Ho Wing-nin; Mok Wai-kuen; Choi Ma-yat
- Directed by: Lee Yim-fong; Lin Chi-fan; Au Wai-sing; Lai Suk-fong; Hui Mei-kwan
- Starring: Sunny Chan; Wayne Lai; Astrid Chan; Berg Ng
- Theme music composer: Purple Lee
- Opening theme: Half Life State of Affairs (半生風雲) by Johnny Ip and Lee Kwok-cheung
- Ending theme: You and Her (妳和她) by Lee Kwok-cheung; Keeping Your Sight (留住你目光) by Kristal Tin
- Country of origin: Hong Kong
- Original language: Cantonese
- No. of episodes: 62

Production
- Producer: Ting Leung
- Production location: Hong Kong
- Camera setup: Multi camera
- Production company: Asia Television

Original release
- Network: ATV Home
- Release: 18 December 2000 – 16 March 2001

Battlefield Network
- Traditional Chinese: 電視風雲
- Simplified Chinese: 电视风云
- Literal meaning: "Television State of Affairs"
Transcriptions
Standard Mandarin
- Hanyu Pinyin: Diàn Shì Fēng Yún
Yue: Cantonese
- Jyutping: Din4 Si4 Fung1 Wan4

Battlefield Network is a 2000 Hong Kong television drama produced by ATV and starring Sunny Chan, Wayne Lai, Astrid Chan and Berg Ng. It was aired on ATV Home from 18 December 2000 to 16 March 2001 with one part airing from 18 December 2000 to 9 February 2001 from 8:30PM to 9:30PM and the rest from 12 February to 16 March 2001 from 10PM to 11PM.

== Synopsis ==
The series is a depiction of Hong Kong's television and movie industries from 1970s to roughly the late 1990s.

The main character, Fong Siu Long (Sunny Chan) wanted to work with his brother Fong Siu Keung (Wayne Lai) in a television station called Red Strings Television (RSTV, the in-universe stand-in for the real life Television Broadcasts Limited (TVB)), but wound up working for Media Television (MTV, the in-universe stand-in for the now defunct Asia Television) instead. From there, the two brothers, along with the family, will experience the ups and downs of life, as well as changes in Hong Kong's TV industry.

== Cast ==
=== Fong Family ===
- Sunny Chan as Fong Siu Long (方紹龍): reportedly a depiction of a former ATV worker who eventually became one of the station's Vice Presidents. He wound up working for MTV, after trying, without success, to work at RSTV. He worked his way up from his starting job as a Production Assistant, and eventually became a high-level executive at the station he has worked for all his life.
- Wayne Lai as Fong Siu Keung (方紹強): reportedly a depiction of film director Wong Jing. He worked at RSTV, and later became a movie director.
- Lai Ka-ka as Fong Sze-man (方思雯): Siu Long and Siu Keung's sister. She later developed a career as an actress specializing in action movies.
- Wong Shu-tong as Fong Yuen (方元): Siu Long and Siu Keung's father.
- Paw Hee-ching as Chow Ping (周萍): Siu Long and Siu Keung's mother.

=== Media Television ===
- Berg Ng as Fok Wai Lhung (霍偉良): reportedly a composite character consisting of several former ATV producers. He was a senior producer at Media Television. He later became a movie director, wound up in jail, and returned to the TV industry after he was released from prison.
- Simon Chui as Lee Pak-tin (利伯天): Worked at MTV as an executive. He was later recruited to Goodwill Television (the in-universe stand-in for the defunct Commercial Television), and later returned to Media Television.
- Emotion Cheung as Cheung Kan-ming (張近明): a production assistant at MTV. He later had a career as a movie director, but was killed by triad members.
- Karen Chan as Ann Wan (溫飛霞): A production assistant that later married Siu Long. Died in a car accident in Australia.
- Kwan Kin as Chiu Tai Chung (趙大昌): reportedly a depiction of businessman Deacon Chiu, he bought Media Television, and renamed it Global Television (寰宇電視). Like the real life counterpart, Tai Cheung is known for being a miserly person.
- David Lau as Lee Fu (李富): A businessman who, after meeting Siu Long in Australia and hearing about the thrills of working in television, decided to buy MTV (by then renamed Global Television) outright. He renamed the station Sky Television (天下電視)

=== Actors/Actresses ===
- Cecilia Lai as Chow Wing Chi (周詠芝): An actress who began her career at MTV, later moved to RSTV, and then returned to MTV (by then renamed Sky Television) after her husband and mother were embroiled in a gambling debt scandal. She and Siu Long had a relationship, which was quashed by her mother. She had an affair with Lee Fu, the station's owner, but was later dumped. She suffered from a mental breakdown after that.
- Andrew Yuen as Chow Kwok Yau (周國友): An actor who began his career at MTV, and later moved to RSTV. He married Chow Wing Chi, but later divorced due to a gambling debt scandal that resulted in a decision by RSTV to not renew their contracts.
- Lam Chi-pok as Lau Chi Shun (劉志信): reportedly a depiction of the late ATV actor David Lau (who also had a role in this series). He is an actor at MTV.
- Kristal Tin as Ai Mei Yee (艾美儀): A movie actress. She became romantically involved with Fong Siu Keung, even when he was a married man. She left Siu Keung for Lee Fu, in a plot hatched by Lee Fu, as Siu Keung was obsessed with the actress.

=== Other characters ===
- Astrid Chan as Cheung Yuet (張月): A former reporter who later worked for MTV for a short time. She later became a radio host, and eventually was married to Fong Siu Long. The two had had feelings for each other for years.
- Ricky Chan as Sung Wai-nin (沈偉年)
- Chung Wai-ming as Hung Siu-siu (洪小小)
- Wong Wan-choi as Chiu Yeuk-yu (趙若愚)
- Lawrence Lau as Koo Tai-pau (古大豹)
- Chow Siu-lun as Yau Tai-hoi (遊大海)
- Kong To as Sze Hoi-yeung (施海揚)
- Henry Fong as Ho Chiu (何照)
- Cheng Yuen-fung as Law Wai-yan (羅偉仁)
- Jerry Leung as Pak Fei (白飛)
