= Japan Time (TV series) =

- Also known as: JP Time TV; Go! Japan TV
- Go! Japan TV 日本大放送
- Genre: Travel
- Presented by: Jam Yau; Rie
- Composer: Kevin MacLeod
- Country of origin: Hong Kong
- Original languages: Japanese; Cantonese
- No. of series: 2
- No. of episodes: 539 (series 1); 48 (series 2)

Production
- Producer: Rason Chau
- Production location: Japan
- Running time: 30 minutes (including adverts)
- Production company: R by R Production Limited

Original release
- Network: ATV World (2005–2016); ViuTV (2016–2022)
- Release: 2 October 2005 – 27 March 2022

Japan Time (Chinese: Go! Japan TV 日本大放送), previously titled JP Time TV when it aired on ATV, is a Hong Kong television travel programme which started airing on 2 October 2005. The show focuses on introducing various Japanese tourist attractions to the audience and it is presented by Jam Yau, who is from Hong Kong, and Rie, who is from Japan. According to Ming Pao, Japan Time is "the longest-running travel program in Hong Kong's history".

== Broadcast ==
The programme was first shown on ATV World on 2 October 2005. Its episodes are 25 minutes long. By 2014, the programme had aired over 400 episodes.

In 2016, it moved to ViuTV after Asia Television ceased broadcast due to nonrenewal of television licence. Since then, the show added Cantonese dubbing.

On 28 January 2016, the show aired an episode that showed Kosaka, Akita, Kakunodate Station, and Akita Dog Fureai-Dokoro at Senshū Park. That year, it aired an episode that discussed a Japanese railroad.

== Reception ==
Writing in the newspaper am730, Kei-wan Wong said that the programme hosts were "fun and entertaining". Ming Pao's Git-ling Wong praised the program, stating, "Jam is one of the hosts. In the show, he and his partner use Japanese and Cantonese to wittily introduce many interesting places in Japan."

Referring to Japan Time and another television series, the actor Sammy Leung wrote in 2016 in Sing Tao Daily, "Japan Time is a simple and interesting Japanese travel journal. Although it introduces some places that we may not go to, the two hosts, Rie and Jam, are quite humorous, and sometimes they will include a sentence or two of Cantonese in Japanese. The words are both kind and authentic. If ATV is really going to end, these two programs should be the ones I'm most reluctant to part with."
