= Fun Time (TV program) =

- Genre: Bloopers comedy
- Starring: Richard Ng
- Country of origin: Hong Kong
- Original language: Cantonese

Original release
- Network: ATV
- Release: 1989 – 1990

Fun Time (吳耀漢攪攪震 or 六星級攪攪震) was a non-serialised comedy TV show in Hong Kong in the 1980s. It was broadcast on Asia Television Limited (ATV).

== Description ==
The show is mainly a TV blooper comedy where Richard Ng play pranks on ordinary citizens. The name of the show literally means "six star disturbance".

== Reruns ==
The show was also rerun in the 2000s (decade).

== See also ==
- TV's Bloopers & Practical Jokes
- Foul-Ups, Bleeps & Blunders
