= Empress Wu (TV series) =

- Traditional Chinese: 武則天
- Simplified Chinese: 武则天
- Literal meaning: Wu Zetian
- Hanyu Pinyin: Wǔ Zétiān
- Jyutping: Mou5 Zak1-tin1
- Genre: Historical drama
- Starring: Petrina Fung; Tony Liu; Savio Tsang; Lo Chun-shun; Pat Poon; Lau Hung-fong
- Theme music composer: Kwan Sing-yau
- Opening theme: Chi Ngo Mou Ching Yau Ching (知我無情有情) performed by Cheung Nam-ngan
- Ending theme: hung guk juei yam (空谷足音) performed by Cheung Nam-ngan
- Country of origin: Hong Kong
- Original language: Cantonese
- No. of episodes: 40

Production
- Executive producer: Lee Siu-wah
- Production location: Hong Kong
- Running time: 45 minutes per episode
- Production company: ATV

Original release
- Network: ATV Home
- Release: 6 August – 28 September 1984

Empress Wu is a 1984 Hong Kong television serial based on the biography of Wu Zetian (Cantonese: Mou Zak-tin), the only woman in Chinese history to assume the title of "Empress Regnant", starring Petrina Fung as the title character. The serial was produced by ATV and was first aired in Hong Kong on ATV Home from 6 August to 28 September 1984.

It was shown with English subtitles in Australia on SBS from 1987 to 1990.

A dubbed English version of the serial was broadcast in the United Kingdom on Channel 4 in sixty-five weekly 30-minute episodes from 4 October 1987 to 21 January 1989.

== Cast ==
Note: Some of the characters' names are in Cantonese romanisation.

- Petrina Fung as Mou Zak-tin
- Tony Liu / Savio Tsang as Ming Sung-yim
- Lo Chun-shun as Tong Ko-tsung
- Pat Poon as Yu-man Chun
- Lau Hung-fong as Sheung-koon Yuen-yee
- Ban Ban as Empress Wong
- Chan Choi-yin as Consort Siu
- Kong Hon as Tong Toi-tsung
- Pamela Peck as Empress Cheung-suen
- Eric Wan as Lei Yin
- Wong Siu-fung as Ha Fei-yin
- Lee Ngoi-wah as Lady of Ngai
- Ling Man-hoi as Cheung-suen Mo-gei
- Simon Chui as Yuen Tin-gong
- Lee Kwok-fai as Lei Toi
- Tong Pan-cheung as Ching-sum
