= My Date with a Vampire =

1998 Hong Kong television series

- Promotional poster
- Genre: Fantasy, jiangshi fiction, horror comedy, supernatural, romance
- Written by: Leung Lap-yan; Cheung Sai-cheung; Shum Lap-keung; Yip Tin-sing; Fan Lai-ming; Wong Chiu-cheung; Siu Kwok-wah; Kwan Bing-hung; Hui Sa-long; Kwok Po-yin
- Directed by: Chan San-hap; Tang Wai-yan; Lee Leung-sing; Wong Wai-kit; Poon Ka-fuk; Chan Kwok-wah; Tang Hin-sing
- Starring: Eric Wan; Joey Meng; Kristy Yang; Kenneth Chan; Berg Ng; Pinky Cheung; Chapman To; Cheung Kwok-kuen
- Opening theme: "Who's in the Dream" (夢裡是誰) by Linda Wong
- Composer: Michael Lai
- Country of origin: Hong Kong
- Original language: Cantonese
- No. of episodes: 35

Production
- Producers: Leung Tin; Sin Chi-wai
- Production location: Hong Kong
- Running time: 45 minutes per episode
- Production company: ATV

Original release
- Network: ATV Home
- Release: 30 November 1998 – 15 January 1999

Related
- Vampire Expert

My Date with a Vampire
- Traditional Chinese: 我和殭屍有個約會
- Simplified Chinese: 我和僵尸有个约会
Transcriptions
Standard Mandarin
- Hanyu Pinyin: Wǒ Hé Jiāngshī Yǒu Gè Yuēhuì
Yue: Cantonese
- Jyutping: Ngo^{5} Wo^{4} Goeng^{1} Si^{1} Jau^{5} Go^{3} Joek^{3} Wui^{6}

My Date with a Vampire is a 1998 Hong Kong television series produced by Asia Television (ATV). The series is a spiritual successor to Vampire Expert, a similar two-season television series aired on ATV in 1995 and 1996. It blends aspects of the "hopping" corpses of Chinese jiangshi fiction with those of European vampires, along with elements of Chinese mythology and modern horror legends. The series is also a tribute to Lam Ching-ying, the lead actor of Vampire Expert and a prominent cast member of the Mr. Vampire franchise, who died of liver cancer in 1997. It was followed by My Date with a Vampire II (2000) and My Date with a Vampire III (2004).

== Synopsis ==
Fong Tin-yau was a Chinese guerrilla fighter during the Second Sino–Japanese War. In 1938, he was duelling with Yamamoto Kazuo, an Imperial Japanese Army officer, when they were interrupted by Tseung-san, an ancient vampire. The two men and a boy, Fook Sang, were bitten by Tseung-san and have become vampires.

In the present-day (1998), Fong has found a new life as a policeman in Hong Kong while Fook Sang pretends to be his son. During this time, Fong encounters Ma Siu-ling, the heiress to a sorcerer clan dedicated to ridding the world of evil supernatural beings. He soon gets entangled in a love triangle with Ma and her close friend, Wong Zan Zan.

Meanwhile, Yamamoto has become an influential businessman in Hong Kong. Planning to turn every human into a vampire, Yamamoto sends his vampire followers to attack people and spread the "vampire gene". Chaos break out in Hong Kong as vampires multiply and roam the streets freely. Fong teams up with Ma and their allies to stop Yamamoto and destroy him.

Shortly after, a sorcerer called Rahu resurrects Yamamoto and controls him to do his bidding. Rahu perform a ritual during a blood moon to dominate the world. Once again, Fong, Ma and their allies combine forces to confront Rahu and stop him.

== Cast ==
- Eric Wan as Fong Tin-yau
- Joey Meng as Ma Siu-ling / Ma Danna
- Kristy Yang as Wong Zan Zan / Yamamoto Yuki
- Kenneth Chan as Yamamoto Kazuo
- Chapman To as Kam Tseng-zung
- Pinky Cheung as Yamamoto Mirai
- Berg Ng as Ken / Domoto Shingo
- Cheung Kwok-kuen as Fuksang
- Wong Shee-tong as Ho Yingkiu
- Kam San as Tseung-san
- Sin Ho-ying as Master Peacock
- Ching Tung as Lo Hoiping
- Chan Lai-wun as Lo Hoiping's mother
- Mak King-ting as Bak Sousou
- Wong Mei-fan as Siu-tsing
- Philip Keung as Gou Bou
- Chung Yeung as Peter
- Lisa Lui as Auyong Ga-ga
- Lau Kwok-shing as Kam Sau-tsang
- Ng Wan-yee as Kam Tseng-zung's mother
- Wai Lit as Rahu
- Alice Chan as Miusin
- Raymond Tsang as Lau Hoi
- Yeung Ka-nok as Lam Kok-dong
- Leung Bik-tze as Bik-ga
- Lee Yung as Herman
- Lau Shek-yin as Vairocana

== Production ==
The script for My Date with a Vampire was written by Leung Lap-yan in 1997. Leung attempted to market the script to Television Broadcasts Limited (TVB) but was rejected, so he went to Asia Television (ATV) instead. Chan Sap-sam, who wrote the script for the two sequels, revealed that Lam Ching-ying, a prominent cast member in the Mr. Vampire franchise, was their original choice for the lead actor, and that Joey Meng did not have a place in their initial cast list. However, after they finalised the script, they were unable to contact Lam, who was critically ill. Besides, ATV's top management was not pleased with the script because they felt that it did not fit people's impressions of how vampires should be like. ATV's top management wanted to cancel the project after Lam died of liver cancer in 1997. Faced with these problems, Chan decided to make bold changes to the script and create a new character – Ma Siu-ling, a female ghostbuster wearing high heels and a miniskirt who is greedy for money. Sin Chi-wai, the producer for the series, recommended Joey Meng to play Ma Siu-ling. When Eric Wan was offered to play the male lead character in the series, he wanted to turn down the offer because he felt exhausted, but eventually agreed as he became more interested in the story.

== Future development ==
According to Netease Report, Fox Networks Group will remake the series. Cora Yim, the head of Fox Networks Group Asia, claimed that one-third of ATV's inventory had been acquired by Fox Networks Group, including 28 television series; My Date with a Vampire is one of the 28.

== See also ==
- Vampire film
- List of vampire television series
