= Genghis Khan (ATV TV series) =

- Chinese: 成吉思汗
- Jyutping: Sing4 Gat1 Si1 Hon4
- Genre: Historical drama
- Written by: Tang Wai-lun; Wun Chi-pang; Cheung Tze-san; Cheng Shing-mou; Leung Kim-ho
- Directed by: Leung Jin-kei; Law Ting
- Starring: Tony Liu; Sun Xing; Eva Lai
- Country of origin: Hong Kong
- Original languages: Cantonese; Mongolian (dubbed)
- No. of episodes: 20

Production
- Producer: Lee Siu-wah
- Production locations: Hong Kong; Inner Mongolia
- Editor: Leung Kim-ho
- Running time: 45 minutes per episode
- Production company: ATV

Original release
- Network: ATV
- Release: 14 December 1987 – 1988

Related
- Genghis Khan (TVB version)

Genghis Khan is a 1987 Hong Kong television series based on the life of Genghis Khan, the founder of the Mongol Empire in the 13th century. The series was produced by ATV and released three months after a similarly titled television series was aired by ATV's rival TVB.

== Cast ==
- Tony Liu as Genghis Khan / Yesügei
- Sun Xing as Jamukha
- Eva Lai as Börte
- Poon Sin-yi as Hoelun
- Berg Ng as Hasar
- Cheng Shu-fung as Belgutei
- Wai Lung as Daicha'er
- Philip Keung as Bo'orchu
- Simon Chui as Jelme
- Kwan Wai-lun as Muqali
- Chan Leung as Jebe
- Kwan Tze-biu as Chilaun
- Chan Sai-wah as Chenbai
- Yau Dai-pang as Bolewule
- Tang Tak-kwong as Hubilai
- Ling Mun-hoi as Menglike
- Ng Shing-fat as Jochi
- Fat Lit as Chagatai
- Cheung Wai as Ögedei
- Law Sung-wah as Tolui
- Wing Biu as Huo'erchi
- Cheng Lui as Taliehutai
- Choi Kwok-hing as Dexuechan
- Law Shek-ching as Wang Khan
- Lee Kong as Sangkun
- Ngo Lung as Suo'erhanshila
- Ling Fei-lik as Kuokuochu (witch doctor)
- Mang Lai-ping as Heda'an
- Siu San-yan as Sacha
- Fan Wing-wah as Bulibokuo
- Mun Lai-mui as Huozhen
- Ng Yiu-leung as Zha'erchi
- Cheung Tsang as Wang Jing
- Lo Chun-shun as Tayan Khan
- Leung Hon-wai as Fan Jicheng
- Keung Hon as Xin Qiji
- Paw Hon-lam as Lu You
- Keung To as Qiu Chuji
- Pat Poon as Yelü Chucai
- Ching Lam as Khulan
- Chun Wai-mun as Gu'erbiesu
- Lau Yuk-fung as Chiliedu
- Choi Man-yip as Suchi
- Chan Choi-yin as Yesui
- Tse Kwai-chi as Yesugan
- Chow Wai-kuen as Heida
- Yuen Ling-to as Kuokuochu (chariot driver)
- Law Man-ling as Kuokuochu (adopted son)
