= Kenneth Chan Kai-tai =

Hong Kong actor and television host

Kenneth Chan
- Born: 16 July 1964 (age 62); Hong Kong
- Spouse: Unknown (m. 1998)

Chinese name
- Traditional Chinese: 陳啟泰
- Simplified Chinese: 陈启泰
Transcriptions
Standard Mandarin
- Hanyu Pinyin: Chén Qǐtài
Yue: Cantonese
- Jyutping: Chan4 Kai2-taai3

Kenneth Chan Kai-tai (born 16 July 1964) is a Hong Kong actor and television host for Cable TV Hong Kong channel (previously working for TVB and ATV).

== Career ==
Chan is an alumnus of St. Paul's Co-educational College, Fisher Park High School (where he sang in the school choir and performed in school productions such as 'Bye Bye Birdie') and Carleton University in Ottawa, Canada. He used to work at JPMorgan Chase as a Customer Service Supervisor and later joined an advertising company.

In 1990 he joined TVB to be the host of some TVB programmes. At the same time he also played a supporting role in some TV dramas. However, he generally failed to get a leading role in TVB. In 1998, ATV invited Chan to join the network with higher salary.

At ATV, Chan is best known as the host of Baak Maan Fu Yung, the Hong Kong version of Who Wants to Be a Millionaire?. The show boosted his career. He had also played three different characters in the three seasons of the My Date with a Vampire television series trilogy, in which each character is related by cloning or reincarnation of the original Yamamoto Kazuo in the first series.

In March 2009, ATV did not extend his contract thus Chan left ATV and joined CATV. In 2011, he returned to ATV but due to financial difficulties, ATV stopped producing enough TV programmes which lead to the decision to leave ATV again in 2013. Chan now is contracted with ViuTV.

== Personal life ==
He was born in a rich family, living in a flat of Mid-levels. He has three elder brothers. He became a Canadian citizen when he was two years old. He married a piano teacher in April 1998. The couple has no children and lived in Kwun Tong.

== Filmography ==
=== Television series ===
Year	Title	Role	Network
2018	Shadow of Justice	郭 Sir	ViuTV
2018	Plan B		ViuTV
2011	ICAC Investigators 2011		
2010	The Men of Justice	Tong Ka-ming	ATV
2009	Happy Family 2009 開心大發現 2009	Brother Ken 大佬 Ken	
2009	Cable Scientific Inspector 神探csi	Presenter	
2008	Today in Court 今日法庭	Presenter	
2006	Central Affairs 2	Chai Chun-yu	
2006	Hong Kong Special Cases	Ma Ho-yin	
2004	My Date with a Vampire III	Yuenngan Pat-por	ATV
2001	Who Wants to Be a Millionaire?	Presenter	ATV
2002	Project Ji Xiang	Yam Gut-cheung	ATV
1999	My Date with a Vampire II 我和殭屍有個約會II	Yamamoto Katsuo 山本一夫	
1999	Flaming Brothers 縱橫四海		
1999	The Mad Phoenix 南海十三郎	Tong Tik-sang 唐滌生	
1999	Divine Retribution 世纪之战	Au-yeung Wai-lun 欧阳玮伦	
1998	My Date with a Vampire 我和殭屍有個約會	Yamamoto Katsuo 山本一夫	ATV
1997	Untraceable Evidence		TVB
1997	I Can't Accept Corruption		TVB
1997	The Disappearance		TVB
1997	Time Before Time		TVB
1997	Old Time Buddy		TVB
1996	Weapons of Power		TVB
1995	The Condor Heroes 95	Wan Chi-ping	TVB
1995	Detective Investigation Files	Kong Yu Hien 江宇軒	TVB
1995	Detective Investigation Files II	Kong Yu Hien 江宇軒	TVB
1994	Fate of the Clairvoyant		TVB
1993	The Vampire Returns		TVB
1992	Angel's Call		TVB

== Discography ==
Year	Title
2009	The Past of Hong Kong 香港往事
2004	Final Answer 最後答案

Awards and achievements
Power Academy Awards
Preceded by -	Outstanding Actor in Television; 2001 for Project Ji Xiang	Succeeded by Moses Chan for Where the Legend Begins
