= Fist of Fury (TV series) =

- DVD cover art
- 精武門
- Genre: Martial arts
- Written by: Lee Yee-wah; Chan Sap-sam; Yau Fuk-hing; Siu Kwok-wah; Ho Wing-nin; Mok Wai-kin; Tang Kwai-sim; Cheung Kwok-yuen
- Directed by: Benny Chan; Leung Yan-chuen; Wong Kam-tin; Cheng Wai-man; Wu Ming-hoi; Tang Hin-sing
- Starring: Donnie Yen; Joey Meng; Eddy Ko; Leung Yat-ho; Kenny Lin Teruyuki; Yeung Chak-lam; Cong Shan; Lau Chi-wing
- Theme music composer: Kunihiko Ryo
- Opening theme: "Hero of Jingwu" (精武英雄) by Donnie Yen
- Country of origin: Hong Kong
- Original language: Cantonese
- No. of episodes: 30

Production
- Producer: Lung Siu-kei
- Production location: Hong Kong
- Running time: 45 minutes per episode
- Production companies: ATV; STAR TV

Original release
- Network: ATV Home; STAR Chinese Channel
- Release: 21 August – 29 September 1995

Related
- Legend of the Fist: The Return of Chen Zhen (2010)

Fist of Fury (精武門) is a 1995 Hong Kong martial arts television series adapted from the 1972 film of the same title. Produced by Asia Television (ATV) and STAR TV, the series starred Donnie Yen as Chen Zhen, a character previously portrayed by Bruce Lee in Fist of Fury (1972) and Jet Li in Fist of Legend (1994). The series is also related to the 2010 film Legend of the Fist: The Return of Chen Zhen, in which Yen reprises his role.

== Synopsis ==
Set in early 20th-century China, the series follows Chen Zhen, who moves to Shanghai with his sister after their hometown is destroyed. Shanghai's martial artists' community is divided, while Huo Yuanjia of the Jingwu School seeks unity to resist foreign influence.

After briefly joining the notorious Green Gang and leaving following his sister's death, Chen joins Jingwu School and trains under Huo. He becomes romantically involved with Yumi, the daughter of Japanese consul Takeda Yukio, amidst rising anti-Japanese sentiment among the Chinese. Takeda, secretly leading the Black Dragon Society, has Huo poisoned, leading to his death during a lei tai match.

Chen continues resisting Japanese aggression after Jingwu School is destroyed. He later uncovers Takeda's plan to release a biological weapon, defeats Takeda, who commits suicide, and Yumi dies from her injuries. In the final scene, Chen faces arrest and charges towards surrounding soldiers as they open fire.

== Cast ==
- Donnie Yen as Chen Zhen
- Eddy Ko as Huo Yuanjia
- Joey Meng as Takeda Yumi
- Kenny Lin-Teruyuki as Ishii Hideaki
- Yeung Chak-lam as Takeda Yukio
- Berg Ng as Liu Zhensheng
- Eric Wan as Cai Xuefu
- Leung Yat-ho as Liang Xia
- Cong Shan as Qiqiao
- Lau Chi-wing as Cai Liujin
- Sin Ho-ying as Ishii Hiroshi
- Paw Hee-ching as Mrs Takeda
- Ng Yuen-chun as Kuki
- Mai Kei as Hu En
- Renee Dai as Xiaoyan
- Bobby Tsang as Ye Dachang
- Lee Mo-king as Ye Dachang's wife
- Ng Siu-ching as Ma Xiaoqing
- Stephen Au as the Muay Thai fighter
- Cheng Shu-fung as Hong Bao
- Hung Yan-yan as Hong Fei
- Philip Keung as Ah-Zhong
- Ken Lok as Zhang Kexiang
- Lo Lieh as Zhang Zongtang
- Hon Yee-sang as Cai Jinhu
- Simon Tsui as Uncle Quan
- Fung Kwok as Nong Jinsun
- Kong To as Mayor Yan
- Mak Kei as Inspector Luo
- Leung Kam-yim as Boss Ma
- Wai Lit as Fang Gaitian
- Kon San as Master Jin
- Kwan Wai-lun as Zheng Tian
- Ling Lai-man as Old Feng
