= Showbiz Tycoon =

Hong Kong television series

- Promotional poster
- 影城大亨
- Genre: Semi-biographic drama
- Screenplay by: Ka Lei; Wai Cho-yee; Wong Hiu-chong; Cat Kwan; Cheung Mau; Kwok Yat-san
- Directed by: Steve Cheng; Poon Wai-kei; Lee Wai-chu; Tam Yau-yip; Law Choi-man; Lau Kwok-fai; Shek Ming-chuen; Siu Kin-hang; Chu Yik-lung; Yuen Shu-wai
- Starring: Michael Tao; Carina Lau; Wayne Lai; Alex Fong; Angie Cheung; Kathy Chow; Astrid Chan; Lee Siu-kei
- Theme music composer: Chan Chit-lo
- Opening theme: A Certain Year and Month (某年某月) by Carina Lau
- Ending theme: Space (空間) by Astrid Chan; Unforgettable Romance (忘不了情) by Carina Lau
- Composers: Wing Lo; Lincoln Lo
- Country of origin: Hong Kong
- Original language: Cantonese
- No. of episodes: 67

Production
- Producers: Lee Siu-kei; Steve Cheng; Lee Wai-chu
- Production location: Hong Kong
- Camera setup: Multi camera
- Production companies: Asia Television; Jing's Production; Win's Entertainment

Original release
- Network: ATV Home
- Release: 1 May – 29 July 2000

Showbiz Tycoon
- Traditional Chinese: 影城大亨
- Simplified Chinese: 影城大亨
- Literal meaning: "Film Studio Tycoon"
Transcriptions
Standard Mandarin
- Hanyu Pinyin: Yǐng Chéng Dà Hēng
Yue: Cantonese
- Jyutping: Jing2 Sing4 Daai6 Hang1

Showbiz Tycoon is a 2000 Hong Kong semi-biographical television drama loosely based on the life of Hong Kong entertainment mogul Run Run Shaw, founder of film company Shaw Brothers Studio and television company TVB. The drama stars Michael Tao as Shaw, Carina Lau as Shaw's wife Mona Fong, Wayne Lai and Alex Fong respectively as Leonard Ho and Raymond Chow, Shaw's former business partners and founders of Golden Harvest, Shaw Brothers' rival company.

== Cast ==
Cast	Role	Based on
Michael Tao	Wan Yuet-ting (溫月庭)	Run Run Shaw
Carina Lau	Lui Mung-wah (雷夢華)	Mona Fong
Wayne Lai	Ho Chi-cheung (賀志祥)	Leonard Ho
Alex Fong	Sau Man-kit (仇文傑)	Raymond Chow
Angie Cheung	Wong Ying (黃盈)	Wong Mei-chun
Angie Cheung	Cho Mei-lan (曹美蘭)	JoJo Cho
Kathy Chow	Tung Yan (童恩)	Lin Dai
Astrid Chan	Ching Po (程波)	Ivy Ling Po
Lee Siu-kei	Choi Kau (蔡球)	Chua Lam
Wong Oi-yiu	Sau man-hei (仇文希)	
Lawrence Yan	Kam Tong (金棠)	Chin Han
Lung Fong	Lok To (洛濤)	Loke Wan Tho
Lam Wai	Yuen Tung-hoi (袁東海)	
Lam Wai	Wan Wai-chung (溫偉中)	Shaw Vee-meng
Lawrence Lau	Wan Yan-pan (溫仁彬)	Runde Shaw
Teresa Mak	Tik Wah (狄樺)	Tina Leung
Pinky Cheung	Lau Suet-fa (劉上花)	Lau Leung-wah
Charlie Cho	Lei Hon-cheung (利漢昌)	Li Han-hsiang
Chin Ka-sing	Lee Kei (李奇)	Lui Kei
Stephen Au	Lui Lung (雷龍)	Bruce Lee
Gwennie Tam	Linda	Linda Lee Cadwell
Jessica Chow	Hung Hung (紅紅)	Lee Ching
Yeung Ka-nok	Chor Chin-man (楚千萬)	Chor Yuen
Yiu Chi-kwan	Hung Hung's mother	
Soh Hang-suen	Fong Chi-ping (方之萍)	
Paw Hee-ching	Fong Chi-lin (方之蓮)	
Miu Fei-lam	Ho Chi-chi (賀芝芝)	Lily Ho
Sze Kai-keung	Law Fai (羅輝)	Lo Wei
Elena Kong	Yiu Cho-sau (姚楚秀)	Nora Miao
Wai Lit	Law Lik (羅力)	Jimmy Wang Yu
Simon Chui	Ngan Kwan (顏坤)	
Karen Chan	Lui Lai-ying (雷麗英)	
Tsui Po-fung	Mrs. Lee (李夫人)	Christina Lee Look Ngan-kwan
Wong Wan-choi	Cheung Tit (張鐵)	Chang Cheh
Chapman To	Sing Lung (勝龍)	Jackie Chan
Berg Ng	Tsui Pak (徐白)	Tsui Hark
Philip Keung	Master Lau (劉師父)	Lau Kar-leung
Chow Siu-lung	Kwan's underling	
Wu Hang-tung	Kwan's underling	
Derek To	actor	
Steve Yap	Robert Lui (雷浩)	Brandon Lee
Kwan Yau-lun	Hui Yau-fu (許有富)	Michael Hui
Cheng Wai-long	Hui Yau-wing (許有榮)	Samuel Hui
Teresa Lou	actress	
Yiu Pui-kwan	actress	
Chan Cheuk-lun	actor	
Chung Wai-ling	Tsui Suk-han (徐淑嫻)	
Andrew Yuen	Hui Pan-tin (許品天)	
Siu Kin-hang	Lung Tim-ping (龍添平)	Lung Sing-fun
Benny Lai	Choi Chi-kin (蔡志堅)	
Ricky Chan	Choi Chi-keung (蔡志強)	
Susan Tse	Ho Chi-cheung's mother	
Tam Siu-ying	Tung Yan's mother	
Wong Chu-tong	Cho Mei-lan's father	
