= Central Affairs =

Hong Kong television series

Central Affairs (情陷夜中環) is a 2005 TV series produced by Hong Kong's Asia Television in 2005. Directed by Wong Jing, and starred Patrick Tse and Michelle Ye, the series focused on the morality of the insurance business. It had a spin-off series in 2006, titled Central Affairs 2 (情陷夜中環2), also directed by Wong Jing. In 2005, the Life Underwriters Association of Hong Kong Limited (香港人壽保險從業員協會) filed a complaint with the Television and Entertainment Licensing Authority (香港影視及娛樂事務管理處) about some scenes in the series.
