= Eric Wan =

Hong Kong actor

- Born: 28 October 1964 (age 61); Hong Kong
- Education: St John's Co-education College
- Occupation: Actor
- Years active: 1984-present

Chinese name
- Traditional Chinese: 尹天照
Transcriptions
Standard Mandarin
- Hanyu Pinyin: Yǐn Tiānzhào
Yue: Cantonese
- Jyutping: Wan5 Tin1-ziu3

Eric Wan Tin-chiu (born 28 October 1964) is a Hong Kong television actor best known for his role as "Fong Tin-yau" in the My Date with a Vampire television series trilogy produced by the Hong Kong television network ATV. Wan began his acting career after graduating from the ATV Training Course in 1983. He started as a host in television programmes for children before entering the drama department. He has since acted in many films and television series, including Century of the Dragon, Horoscope One: Voices from Hell, Ransom Express, 2 Reincarnated 2, Fist of Fury, and DNA.

== Filmography ==
=== Feature films ===
- Century Hero (Bruce Lee Bio) (1999)
- Horoscope One: Voices from Hell (1999)
- House of the Dammed (1999)
- Century of the Dragon (1999)
- Ransom Express (2000)
- Ghost Promise (2000)
- Sharp Guns (2001)
- Yao Wu Yang Wei – Fantasy of Hero (2002)
- Shanghai Knights (30s cameo) (2003)
- My Honeymoon with a Vampire (2003)
- The Peeper Story 2 – The Escape Partner (2003)
- The Prince of Storm (2003)
- The Reporter (2003)
- Mission X (2004)
- Missing Link (unknown year)
- Faces (unknown year)
- Run for Life (unknown year)

=== Telemovies ===
- My Death Project (unknown year)
- Hong Kong Criminal Archives – Gang AK47 (1992)

=== Television ===
- Empress Wu (1984)
- Bitter Conflict (1984)
- Ten Brothers (1985)
- The Legendary Prime Minister – Zhuge Liang (1985)
- Sensational Cases of the Late Qing Period (1986)
- Heroes of Shaolin (1986)
- Buddha Jin 2 (1986)
- Xi Shih (1986)
- The Duel (1987)
- The Merry Young Boxer (1987)
- The Devil Twin (1987)
- The Rise and Fall of Qing Dynasty (1987)
- The Rise and Fall of Qing Dynasty 2 (1988)
- Court Secret Agent (1988)
- Wordless Kung Fu Scripture (1989)
- Thunder Knight (1989)
- City of Swordsman (1989)
- The Blood Sword (1990)
- The God of Sword (1990)
- Legend of Long Quan Ling (1991)
- The Solitary Swordsman (1991)
- Police Story (1992)
- Mythical Crane Magical Needle (1992)
- Gamblers Dream (1993)
- Shanghai Godfather (1993)
- 2 Reincarnated 2 (1993)
- The Legend of Yue Fei (1994)
- Fist of Fury (1995)
- I have a Date with Spring (1995)
- Vampire Expert 2 (1996)
- Who is the Killer (1996)
- The Swordsman (1996)
- Coincidentally (1997)
- 97 The Year of Chameleon (1997)
- My Date with a Vampire (1998)
- A Lawyer can be Good (1998)
- The Lost Prince (1999)
- DNA (2001)
- My Date with a Vampire 2 (2001)
- Lady Stealer (2002)
- Thunder Cops (2003)
- My Date with a Vampire 3 (2004)
