= The Men of Justice =

Hong Kong non-fiction television series

The Men of Justice <法網群英> is a television series broadcast by ATV, created and produced by the Gary Tang Tak Hei. The cast includes Lawrence Ng, Amy Chan, Kenneth Chan, Pinky Cheung, Jacky Lui, and William So.

Incorporating several controversial cases, The Men of Justice focuses on the perpetual conflict between law enforcement and criminal activities. The series incorporates elements from current events that Hong Kong audience is familiar with. It also includes a battle-of-wits little-known outside the court system, such as how to skillfully use legal procedures, and how to choose members of the jury for important cases.

Interspersed between the development of the characters’ relationships are the legal cases, which include: a medical malpractice case; corruption within the police force; a witness failing to help a traffic accident victim, which ultimately led to the person's death; the death of a wealthy tycoon and the subsequent dispute over his will.
