= Vampire Expert =

Hong Kong television series

- Season 2 title card
- 殭屍道長
- Genre: Fantasy, jiangshi fiction, horror comedy, supernatural
- Starring: Lam Ching-ying
- Country of origin: Hong Kong
- Original language: Cantonese
- No. of seasons: 2
- No. of episodes: 90

Production
- Running time: 40 minutes

Original release
- Network: ATV Home
- Release: 16 October 1995

Vampire Expert is 1995 Hong Kong television series produced by ATV and starring Lam Ching-ying. The two-season series served as a transition from film to television for the 1980s Hong Kong Chinese vampire film franchise. A third season was planned, but due to the poor health and subsequent death of lead actor Lam Ching-ying, the series was cancelled in 1996.

== Synopsis ==
Taoist priest Mo Siu-fong (Lam Ching-ying) and his apprentice Ma Fan (Yung Kam-cheong) travel to Hong Kong in pursuit of an ancient vampire.

== Cast ==
- Lam Ching-ying as Mo Siu-fong
- Kingdom Yuen as Zung Gwan
- Yung Kam-cheong as Ma Fan (Season 1)
- Frankie Lam as Mo's apprentice (Season 2)
- Mang Hoi as Mo's apprentice (Season 2)

== Development ==
Following the popularity of various Chinese vampire films in the 1980s, Hong Kong television network ATV World made plans to create a similar television series starring Lam Ching-ying, who was a familiar face in the genre and often typecast. Lam signed on to the film for HK$1 million, and filming started in early 1996.

== Number of episodes ==
Season	Episodes	Notes
1	30	
2	50	
