= ATV Home =

Hong Kong television channel

ATV Home 亞洲電視本港台
- Country: China
- Broadcast area: Hong Kong, Macau, China (Original version); Worldwide (International version); North America (America version)

Programming
- Language: Cantonese
- Picture format: 576i (PAL) 4:3; 576i (SDTV) 16:9

Ownership
- Owner: Asia Television
- Sister channels: ATV World

History
- Launched: 29 May 1957; 69 years ago
- Closed: 2 April 2016; 10 years ago
- Replaced by: ViuTV (DTT service); RTHK TV 31A (analogue service)

Links
- Website: HKatv.com/Home

ATV Home (Chinese: 亞洲電視本港台) was a free-to-air Cantonese television channel in Hong Kong, owned and operated by Asia Television. It was formed in September 1963 as a result of the split of the bilingual Rediffusion Television subscription service (which was primarily owned by British company Rediffusion) into dedicated Cantonese and English-language services. In 1969, the broadcaster was granted a license for over-the-air broadcasting.

Facing heavy competition from its free-to-air competitor TVB Jade, a change in ownership in 2010 and an attempt to cut back on dramas in favour of more current affairs, news, and talk programming resulted in further financial losses and internal conflicts. Owing to ATV's deterioration and other issues, on 31 March 2015 ATV's over-the-air broadcasting license was revoked effective 2 April 2016; the channel signed off shortly before midnight on 1 April 2016, and was replaced on analogue transmission by RTHK TV 31.

== History ==
=== Rediffusion Television ===
ATV Home, in addition to Asia Television's history, traces back to Rediffusion Television, which was Hong Kong's first television service. The service launched on 29 May 1957, and a subscription fee of HK$25 was required to watch programming, which was considered to be expensive at the time.

On 30 September 1963, Rediffusion launched its Cantonese service, and the channel was christened "Rediffusion Television Cantonese Channel" (Chinese: 麗的映聲中文台). This would lay the groundwork for what will eventually become ATV Home.

On 1 February 1967, the channel was renamed "RTV-1" (Chinese: 麗的一台).

On 10 November 1969, Rediffusion was granted a free-to-air television broadcasting license for RTV-1, in addition to its English sister channel RTV-2 (Chinese: 麗的二台). However, RTV was beaten to launch by a competitor, Television Broadcasts Limited. This late arrival would have a major negative impact on new service's viewership, up until its eventual demise in 2016.

The channel in early September 1982 stopped airing the Japanese drama series The Rise of Shogun after airing two of its eight episodes, due to concerns over the rewritten history of Japan and glossing over occupation in the early 1940s.

=== Asia Television ===
On 24 September 1982, Rediffusion Television was bought out by a locally owned enterprise called Far East Group (Chinese: 遠東機構). The new owner renamed Rediffusion to Asia Television, and consequently, the channel was renamed "ATV Cantonese" (Chinese: 亞洲電視中文台).

On 2 February 1987, the channel was again renamed, to "ATV Gold" (Chinese: 亞洲電視黃金台).

Far East Group eventually sold its ATV holdings to local conglomerate Lai Sun Group, and the channel was renamed on 13 February 1989, to "ATV Home" (Chinese: 亞洲電視本港台). In 2015, former ATV executive Selina Chow revealed that the station's new name was supposed to be "ATV Hong Kong" (Chinese: 亞洲電視香港台), but the station was forced to scrap the name, in favor of ATV Home (Chinese: 亞洲電視本港台), after Secretary for Administrative Services and Information Peter Tsao opposed the name.

In September 2015, ATV planned to rebrand the channel as ATV-1 Hong Kong (Chinese: 亞視一台 香港); the plan came to a premature end due to the end of its license.

== Competitive disadvantage ==
Due to its relatively late arrival as a free-to-air Cantonese-language TV station, lesser known actors and lower operating budgets, ATV Home struggled to compete with its Cantonese rival TVB Jade. While the station's programs did, on occasions, lowered TVB's ratings, TVB always managed to eventually regain the lost ratings.

== Programming ==
Although less popular or numerous than TVB drama series, ATV-produced dramas are still well received. Some have attained popular and critical acclaim, such as Crocodile Tears (鱷魚淚), Fatherland (大地恩情), The Legendary Fok (大侠霍元甲), Central Affairs I and II (情陷夜中環) and Reincarnated (天蠶變). Recent productions of note include The Pride of Chao Zhou (我來自潮州), Who is the Winner? (勝者為王), King of the Gambler (千王之王重出江湖) and The Good Old Days (再見艷陽天).

In recent years ATV has created and hosted certain large-scale award shows, the most well-known of which would probably be The Annual Most Popular TV Commercial Awards (十大電視廣告頒獎禮).

Other 'infotainment' programmes like Stories From Afar (尋找他鄉的故事) are ranked highly by public reviews, such as the Appreciation Index Survey Best Television Awards (香港電視節目欣賞指數).

Some ATV programmes, such as the entertainment news show Hong Kong Today (今日睇真D) and Who Wants to Be a Millionaire? (百萬富翁), have proven to be particularly popular, prompting their rival TVB to offer similar shows, such as Focus On Focus (城市追擊) and Weakest Link (一筆OUT消), respectively.

== Well-known programmes ==
- aTV Miss Asia Pageant 亞洲小姐 (1985–2014)
- aTV Mr. Asia Contest 亞洲先生 (2005, 2011–)
- Who Wants to Be a Millionaire? 百萬富翁 (2001–2005)
- Hong Kong Film Awards 香港電影金像獎 (2010, 2011)
- Cheers Hong Kong 香港有飯開 (2011–)

== Drama series ==
- 1984: Drunken Fist 醉拳王無忌
- 1984: Drunken Fist II 醉拳王無忌之日帝月后
- 1993: Fatal Love 危情
- 1993: Hong Kong and Shanghai Godfather Season 1 (再見黃埔灘1之中國教父)
- 1994: Hong Kong and Shanghai Godfather Season 2 (再見黃埔灘2之再起風雲)
- 1994: Bays of Being Parents (可憐天下父母心)
- 1994: Beauty Pageant (ATV) (鳳凰傳説)
- 1994: Secret Battle of the Majesty (君臨天下)
- 1994: Outlaw Hero (法外英雄)
- 1994: The Kungfu Master (洪熙官)
- 1994: A Cruel Lover (郎心如鐵)
- 1995: Pao Qingtian (a.k.a. Judge Bao) (包青天之公正廉明)
- 1995: Fist of Fury (精武門)
- 1995: Vampire Expert Season 1 (僵屍道長1)
- 1996: I Have a Date with Spring (我和春天有個約會)
- 1996: The Little Vagrant Lady (飃零燕)
- 1996: King of Gamblers (千王之王重出江湖)
- 1996: Vampire Expert Season 2 (僵屍道長2)
- 1996: Tales From The Dorms (坊間故事之甘戴綠頭巾)
- 1996: The Little Vagrant Lady II (飃零燕 II 之孤星淚)
- 1997: Forrest Cat Season 1 (肥貓正傳1)
- 1997: Year of Chameleon (97 變色龍)
- 1997: Coincidentally (等著你回來)
- 1997: Pride of Chaozhou (我來自潮州)
- 1997: Gold Rush (著數一族)
- 1998: Thou Shalt Not Cheat (呆佬賀壽)
- 1998: The Heroine of the Yangs (穆桂英大破天門陣)
- 1998: Heroine of the Yangs II (穆桂英 II 十二寡婦征西)
- 1998: I Come From Guangzhou (我來自廣州)
- 1998: My Date with a Vampire (我和殭屍有個約會)
- 1999: Ten Tigers of Guangdong (廣東十虎) co-produced with the Sanlih Network from Taiwan
- 1999: Flaming Brothers (縱橫四海)
- 1999: Forrest Cat Season 2 (肥貓正傳2)
- 2000: My Date with a Vampire 2 (我和殭屍有個約會II)
- 2000: Showbiz Tycoon
- 2001: To Where He Belongs
- 2001: Healing Hearts (俠骨仁心)
- 2002: Mission in Trouble
- 2004: Asian Heroes
- 2004: My Date with a Vampire 3 – the Eternal Legend (我和殭屍有個約會III之永恆國度)
- 2006: Walled Village
- 2006: Relentless Justice (AKA No Turning Back)
- 2008: Flaming Butterfly (火蝴蝶)
- 2008: The Men of Justice (法網群英)
- 2012: Heart's Beat for Love (親密損友)

== See also ==
- Asia Television
