= Flying Fox of Snowy Mountain (disambiguation) =

Fox Volant of the Snowy Mountain, known as Xue Shan Fei Hu (or Xueshan Feihu) in Chinese and alternatively Flying Fox of Snowy Mountain, is a novel by Jin Yong. It may also refer to:

Films and television adaptations

- The Flying Fox in the Snowy Mountains, a 1964 two part Hong Kong film
- The Flying Fox of Snowy Mountain (1978 TV series), a 1978 Hong Kong television series
- The Flying Fox of Snowy Mountain (1985 TV series), a 1985 Hong Kong television series
- The Flying Fox of Snowy Mountain (1991 TV series), a 1991 Taiwanese television series
- The Flying Fox of Snowy Mountain (1999 TV series), a 1999 Hong Kong television series
- Fox Volant of the Snowy Mountain (2006 TV series), a 2006 Hong Kong television series
