= Flying Fox (disambiguation) =

Flying fox is a common name for bats of the genus Pteropus.

Flying fox or Flying Fox may also refer to:

- Acerodon, another genus of bats found in Southeast Asia
- Desmalopex, two further species of bats:
  - White-winged flying fox (Desmalopex leucopterus)
  - Small white-winged flying fox (Desmalopex microleucopterus)
- Flying Fox, character's name in the comic adaptation of Foxbat (RPG character) in the game Champions
- Flying fox, common name used for zip line in Australia and New Zealand
- Flying fox (fish), a species of cyprinid fish
- The Flying Fox (film), a 1964 Hong Kong film
- Flying Fox (horse), a thoroughbred horse
- HMS Flying Fox, Royal Navy ship
- HMS Flying Fox (shore establishment), a shore establishment of the Royal Navy
- Flying Fox (DC Comics), a character in the Young All-Stars comic

== See also ==
- Flying Fox of Snowy Mountain (disambiguation)
- Other Tales of the Flying Fox (disambiguation)
