= Yuen Wah filmography =

This article contains the filmography of Yuen Wah.

== Films ==
Year	Film title	Alternate	Role	Notes
1966	The Eighteen Darts (Part 1)	兩湖十八鏢 (下集)	child actor	a.k.a. Seven Little Tigers (Part 1)
1966	The Eighteen Darts (Part 2)	兩湖十八鏢 (上集)	child actor	a.k.a. Seven Little Tigers (Part 2)
1972	Fist of Fury	精武門	supporting cameo role as a Japanese person stuntman	a.k.a. The Chinese Connection
1972	Way of the Dragon	猛龍過江	stuntman	a.k.a. Return of the Dragon a.k.a. Revenge of the Dragon
1972	The Black Tavern	黑店	"ghost"	
1972	Hapkido	合氣道	"Black Bear student"	a.k.a. Lady Kung Fu
1973	The Awaken Punch	石破天驚	"Court deputy"	a.k.a. Village on Fire
1973	Black Belt	黑帶仇	"thug"	
1973	Back Alley Princess	馬路小英雄	"fighter in casino" (supporting role)	
1973	Attack of the Kung Fu Girls	鐵娃	supporting role	a.k.a. None but the Brave
1973	The Bastard	小雜種	stuntman	
1973	Enter the Dragon	龍爭虎鬥	"tournament fighter" (supporting role) stuntman	
1973	The Money Tree	搖錢樹	"fighter at movie set"	
1973	Fists of the Double K	除霸	"thug" stuntman	a.k.a. Fist to Fist
1973	King of Kung Fu	師兄出馬		a.k.a. He Walks Like a Tiger
1973	Bloody Ring	死亡挑戰		a.k.a. Mandarin Magician
1973	Duel of the Dragons	過關斬將		
1973	He Walks Like a Tiger	師兄出馬	"street performer"	
1973	Ambush	埋伏	"Fan Zhi Long's man"	
1974	Super Kung Fu Kid	小霸王	"thug"	a.k.a. Karado: The Kung Fu Flash a.k.a. The Hong Kong Cat
1974	The Shrine of Ultimate Bliss	鐵金剛大破紫陽觀	"thug" action director	a.k.a. The Stoner a.k.a. Hong Kong Hitman
1974	Conman and the Kung Fu Kid	狼狽為奸	"thug"	a.k.a. From China with Death a.k.a. Wit to Wits
1974	The Tournament	中泰拳壇生死戰	"student"	
1974	The Chinese Tiger	唐山猛虎		
1975	The Valiant Ones	忠烈圖	"pirate" action director	a.k.a. Usurpers of Emperor's Power
1975	The Dragon Tamers	女子跆拳群英會		a.k.a. Belles of Taekwondo
1975	Cleopatra Jones and the Casino of Gold	女金剛鬥狂龍女	thug	
1975	The Association	艷窟神探		
1975	The Sharp Fists in Kung Fu	鐵掌連環拳	supporting role	
1976	Secret Rivals	南拳北腿	"thug" stuntman	a.k.a. Silver Fox Rivals
1976	The Himalayan	密宗聖手	Supporting role	
1976	Brotherhood	江湖子弟	"supporting role"	
1976	Hand of Death	少林門	"bodyguard"	a.k.a. Countdown in Kung Fu
1976	The Magic Blade	天涯明月刀	supporting role stuntman	
1976	The Web of Death	五毒天羅	"Holy Fire member"	
1976	Emperor Chien Lung	乾隆皇奇遇記	"thug"	
1976	Big Bad Sis	沙膽英	"thug"	
1976	The Criminals	香港奇案	supporting role	
1976	The Dragon Missile	飛龍斬	"villager"	
1977	Shaolin Plot	四大門派	"Palace bodyguard"	
1977	Clans of Intrigue	楚留香	"Iga ninja"	
1977	Death Duel	三少爺的劍	"armed thug"	
1977	The Sentimental Swordsman	多情劍客無情劍	"You Long Sheng"	
1977	Pursuit of Vengeance	明月刀雪夜殲仇	"Master Bai Tian" / "impostor"	
1977	The Battle Wizard	天龍八部	supporting role	
1977	Broken Oath	破戒	"Casino guard"	
1977	Judgement of an Assassin	決殺令	supporting role	
1977	The Amsterdam Kill	荷京喋血		
1978	Soul of the Sword	殺絕	"bodyguard"	
1978	The Proud Youth	笑傲江湖	"member of 'Four Friends of Plum Garden'"	
1978	Clan of Amazons	秀花大盜	"Black Devil"	
1978	Game of Death	死亡遊戲	"Lo Chen's second" stuntman	
1978	Legend of the Bat	蝙蝠傳奇	"Mute bodyguard"	a.k.a. Bat Island Adventures
1978	Heaven Sword and Dragon Sabre	倚天屠龍記	"Ming Clan member"	a.k.a. Chivalrous Killer
1978	Heaven Sword and Dragon Sabre Part II	倚天屠龍記大結局	"Ming Clan member"	
1978	Flying Guillotine 2	清宮大刺殺	"patriotic hero" (supporting role)	
1978	Swordsman And Enchantress	蕭十一郎	"one of the Leng brothers"	
1978	My Kung Fu Master	師父教落	supporting role	
1979	The Scandalous Warlord	軍閥趣史	"opera acrobat"	
1979	The Deadly Breaking Sword	風流斷劍小小刀	"thug"	a.k.a. Breaking Sword of Death
1979	Murder Plot	孔雀王朝	supporting role	
1979	The Kung Fu Instructor	教頭	"Master Tan"	
1979	To Kill a Mastermind	七煞	"2nd Chief Hsi Chou"	
1979	Full Moon Scimitar	圓月彎刀	"Black Clan member"	
1979	Coward Bastard	惡爺	"Biao"	
1980	Bat Without Wings	無翼蝙蝠	"Xu Fang"	
1980	The Swift Sword	情俠追風劍	"bandit"	
1980	Daggers 8	空手入白刃		
1980	Heroes Shed No Tears	英雄無淚	"Mu Chi"	
1980	Rendezvous with Death	請帖	"Jin Ju, Poison Scholar"	
1980	The Kid with a Tattoo	通天小子紅槍客	"Lin Fei"	a.k.a. Claws of the Eagle
1980	Killer Constable	萬人斬	"Liu's bodyguard"	a.k.a. Lightning Kung Fu a.k.a. Karate Exterminators
1980	The Tiger and the Widow	徐老虎與白寡婦	supporting role	
1981	Emperor and His Brother	書劍恩仇錄	"No. 6" assistant action director	
1981	The Duel of the Century	陸小鳳之決戰前後	"emperor's guard" action director	
1981	Black Lizard	黑蜥蜴	"Black Lizard" action director	
1981	The Bloodthirsty Dead	飛屍		a.k.a. Revenge of the Corpse
1981	Notorious Eight	千門八將	supporting role	
1981	Return of the Sentimental Swordsman	魔劍俠情	"Ximen Rou" a.k.a. "Green-faced Spear"	
1981	Shaolin Prince	少林傳人	"Li Chin" action director	a.k.a. Iron Fingers of Death a.k.a. Death Mask of the Ninja
1982	Passing Flickers	三十年細說從頭	"policeman" stuntman	
1982	Lovers Blades	神經大俠		
1982	Human Lanterns	人皮燈籠	supporting role	
1982	The Spirit of The Sword	浣花洗劍	"Samurai killer" action director stuntman	
1982	Perils of the Sentimental Swordsman	楚留香之幽靈山莊	action director	
1982	My Rebellious Son	小子有種	"Matsuzaka"	
1982	Mercenaries from Hong Kong	獵魔者	"Wen's brother"	
1983	The Enchantress	妖魂	"Robe's guard" action director	
1983	Shaolin Intruders	三闖少林	"6 demons" action director	
1983	Tales of a Eunuch	鹿鼎記	action director	
1983	Men from the Gutter	暗渠	"gangster" action director	
1983	Descendant of the Sun	日劫	"Prince's bodyguard" action director	
1983	The Supreme Swordsman	老鷹的劍	"Sparrow" a.k.a. "Crow" assistant action director	
1983	Mad, Mad 83	瘋狂83	action choreographer	
1984	Opium and the Kung-Fu Master	洪拳大師	"Zheng Hong's man" action director	a.k.a. Lightning Fists of Shaolin
1984	The Hidden Power of the Dragon Sabre	魔殿屠龍	"Right Guardian of Ming Clan" action director	
1984	Lust from Love of a Chinese Courtesan	愛奴新傳	"Ju San's brother (swordsman)" action choreographer	
1984	The Owl vs Bombo	貓頭鷹與小飛象	action director stuntman	a.k.a. The Owl vs Bombo
1985	Mr. Vampire	殭屍先生	"Vampire Yam" action director	
1985	My Lucky Stars	福星高照	"thug" (cameo) stunt co-ordinator	
1985	Heart of Dragon	龍的心	"Yan" (SWAT team member) action director	
1985	The Island	生死線	action director	
1985	From the Great Beyond	時來運轉	action director	a.k.a. Those Merry Souls
1985	Twinkle, Twinkle, Lucky Stars	夏日福星	action director	
1986	Millionaire's Express	富貴列車	"security officer" "Bank robber"	a.k.a. Shanghai Express
1986	Rosa	神勇雙響炮續集	action director stuntman	
1986	Where's Officer Tuba?	霹靂大喇叭	"gang member" stuntman	a.k.a. Spirit and Me
1986	Eastern Condors	東方禿鷹	"Vietnamese General" action director	
1986	Silent Love	聽不到的說話	action director	
1987	The Final Test	最後一戰	"Chairman"	
1987	Scared Stiff	小生夢驚魂	"Hua (policeman)" action director	
1988	The Haunted Island	鬼猛腳	"East Bay Sergeant Wah" action director	a.k.a. Spooky, Spooky a.k.a. Spooky, Spooky, Spooky
1988	In the Blood	神探父子兵	action director	
1988	A Nightmare	夢過界	"Dream man"	a.k.a. My Dream is Yours
1988	The Greatest Lover	公子多情	"Comrade Zhu Bai Dao" action director	
1988	Dragons Forever	飛龍猛將	"Hua Hsien-Wu"	
1988	Picture of a Nymph	畫中仙	"White haired demon"	a.k.a. Portrait of a Nymph
1988	On the Run	亡命鴛鴦	"Cowardly cop" action director	
1988	Mr. Vampire 4	殭屍叔叔	"Wu-Yuan" action director	a.k.a. Mr. Vampire Saga Four
1988	Three Against the World	群龍奪寶	action director	
1988	Painted Faces	七小福	action director	
1988	Paper Marriage	過埠新娘	action director	
1989	The Iceman Cometh	急凍奇俠	"Fung San" action director	
1990	The Nocturnal Demon	夜魔先生	"gang leader"	a.k.a. Demon Intruder
1990	Legend of the Dragon	龍的傳人	"Master Chow Fei-Hung" action director	
1990	She Shoots Straight	皇家女將	"Yuen Hua"	a.k.a. Lethal Lady
1990	The Swordsman	笑傲江湖	"Jo Lang Sim" / "Zhor" action director	
1990	The Dragon from Russia	紅場飛龍	"Lui Chat Lung, Master of Death"	a.k.a. Crying Freeman: Dragon from Russia
1990	Kung Fu vs. Acrobats	摩登如來神掌	"Tien Chian" action director	a.k.a. Fai & Chi: Kings of Kung Fu a.k.a. Thunderbolt '91
1991	The Magnificent Scoundrels	情聖	"Brother Wah"	
1991	The Top Bet	賭霸	"Sifu Wu Lung Lo" (cameo)	
1991	Bury Me High	衛斯理之霸王卸甲	"General Nguen"	
1991	Red Shield	雷霆掃穴	"Panther"	
1992	The Master	黃飛鴻'92之龍行天下	"Uncle Chan Hou Tak" stunt co-ordinator	
1992	The Big Deal	偷神家族	"Tee Tung-Feng" "The Saint hero"	
1992	Miracle 90 Days	特異功能猩求人	"Uncle Wah"	
1992	Fist of Fury 1991 II	漫畫威龍	"Cheng Wan-To"	
1992	Super Lady Cop	超級女警	"Coach"	
1992	A Kid From Tibet	西藏小子	"Black Section sorcerer"	
1992	Police Story 3: Supercop	警察故事III超級警察	"Panther"	a.k.a. Supercop
1993	The Black Panther Warriors	黑豹天下	"Bloody Wolf"	a.k.a. Warriors: The Black Panther
1993	Kick Boxer	黃飛鴻之鬼腳七	"Chairman Wah"	a.k.a. Once Upon a Chinese Hero
1993	Shaolin Popey II: Messy Temple	笑林小子II新烏龍院		Taiwanese film
1995	Drugs Fighters	緝毒先鋒	"Lin Chia-Teng"	
1995	Tough Beauty and the Sloppy Slop	怒海威龍	"Mainland drug dealer" (cameo)	
1995	Only Fools Fall in Love	呆佬拜壽	"Dai Foo (Dai's father)"	
1997	Hero	馬永貞	"Ma Tai Cheung"	
1998	Leopard Hunting	獵豹行動	"Fang Kuo Ho"	
2000	The Devil Shadow	魔影	"Sifu Lone"	
2001	Vampire Controller	趕屍先生	"Ha La-Chak"	
2001	Ultimatum	最後通牒	"Ola"	
2004	Hidden Heroes	追擊8月15	"Dr Lau"	
2004	Kung Fu Hustle	功夫	"Landlord"	
2005	Kung Fu Mahjong	雀聖	"Chi Mo Sai" "West" "Robert"	
2005	Mob Sister	阿嫂	"Buddhist monk master"	a.k.a. Ah Sou
2005	Dragon Squad	猛龍	"stall owner"	a.k.a. Dragon Heat
2005	Kung Fu Mahjong 2	雀聖2自摸天后	"Chi Mo Sai"	
2005	A Chinese Tall Story	情癲大聖	"Lord Chancellor Tortoise"	
2006	My Kung Fu Sweetheart	野蠻秘笈	"Phoenix' Dad"	
2006	Bet to Basic	打雀英雄傳	"Sam Yuen Wah"	
2006	Don't Open Your Eyes	鬼眼刑警	"Uncle Bing"	
2006	Dating a Vampire	愛上屍新娘	"Mister M"	
2006	Dragon Tiger Gate	龍虎門	"Wong Xianglong"	
2007	Kung Fu Mahjong 3: The Final Duel	雀聖3自摸三百番	"Fortune teller M"	
2007	Twins Mission	雙子神偷	"Chang Chung"	
2007	Contract Lover	合約情人	"Fok's Dad"	
2007	The Valiant Ones New	新忠烈圖		a.k.a. The Valiant Ones New II
2007	Vampire Super			
2008	Australia		"Sing Song"	
2008	The Vampire Who Admires Me			
2009	Team of Miracle: We Will Rock You			
2009	Looking for Jackie			
2010	Just Another Pandora's Box	越光寶盒		
2010	Vampire Warriors	殭屍新戰士		
2010	Kung Fu Wing Chun			
2010	City Under Siege			
2011	Choy Lee Fut	蔡李佛		
2011	I Love Wing Chun			
2013	Princess and the Seven Kung Fu Masters			
2013	Wing Chun Xiao Long			
2014	The Buddha's Shadow	神通佛影		
2015	Monk Comes Down the Mountain	道士下山		
2016	The Bodyguard	特工爺爺		
2018	Detective Chinatown 2	唐人街探案2	Mo Youqian	
2018	Master Z: The Ip Man Legacy		Special Guest Appearance	Spin-off and direct sequel to Ip Man 3
2018	The Trough	低壓槽		
2018	My Kitchen Lover			
2019	Return of the Lucky Stars			
2019	Demon Catching Skill			
2019	The Beast			
2021	Shang-Chi and the Legend of the Ten Rings		Guang Bo	
TBD	Lost But Win	風速極戰		

== Television ==
Year	Series title	Alternate	Role	Notes
1996	Drunken Angels	男人四十打功夫	"Fong Tin Lung"	
1996	Night Journey	殭屍福星	"Tin"	
1997	A Place of One's Own	大澳的天空		
1998	Days in Shaolin		"Tan Shi"	a.k.a. Happy Monk
1999	The Kung Fu Master	京城教	"Tam Tien"	a.k.a. Beijing City
1999	Dragon Love	人龍傳說	"Yip Man"	
1999	Plain Love II	茶是故鄉濃	"Tse Fu Biu"	
1999	Aiming High	撻出愛火花	"Lo Ban"	
2001	Gods of Honour	封神榜	"Lee Jing"	a.k.a. Honour of the Gods
2001	On the Track or Off	勇往直前	"Father Gam"	a.k.a. On Track or Off a.k.a. The Track
2001	Country Spirit	酒是故鄉醇	"Gum Gut Cheurng"	a.k.a. Plain Love III
2002	Burning Flame II	烈火雄心 II	"Kwan On Yam"	
2002	Slim Chances	我要	"So Siu Lum"	a.k.a. Fit Slim Chances
2003	Back to Square One	撲水冤家		
2003	Square Pegs	戇夫成龍	"Bao Heng Fong"	
2003	Eternity: A Chinese Ghost Story	倩女幽魂	"Yan Chi Xia"	
2004	Shades of Truth	水滸無間道	"Song Po"	
2005	Real Kung Fu	佛山贊師父	"Wong Wah-bo"	a.k.a. Mr Chan of Foshan
2005	Guts of Man	肝膽崑崙	"The Master"	a.k.a. Courageous Kunlun
2005	The Gentle Crackdown	秀才遇著兵	"Luk Gin"	
2007	Heavenly In-Laws	我外母唔係人	"Lum Sui" "Water God"	
2007	A Change of Destiny	天機算	"Lee Sing Tin" "Wan Chung Hok"	
2007	The Green Grass of Home	緣來自有機	"Yip Cheurng Faat"	
2007	Word Twisters' Adventures	铁咀银牙	"Lap Lan Gang"	
2011	7 Days in Life	隔離七日情	"Ho Si-chan"	
2011	Forensic Heroes III	法證先鋒III	"Po Shun-hing"	
2013	Ip Man	葉問	"Chen Huashun"	
2015	The Wicked League	惡毒老人同盟		
