= Other Tales of the Flying Fox (disambiguation) =

Other Tales of the Flying Fox, known as Fei Hu Wai Zhuan (or Feihu Waizhuan) in Chinese, is a novel by Jin Yong. An alternate English title is Young Flying Fox. It may also refer to:

Adaptations of the novel

- Legend of the Fox, a 1980 Hong Kong film
- New Tales of the Flying Fox, a 1984 Hong Kong film
- The Sword of Many Loves, a 1993 Hong Kong film
