= The Flying Fox of Snowy Mountain (1985 TV series) =

1985 Hong Kong TV series

- opening title
- 雪山飛狐
- Genre: Wuxia
- Based on: Fox Volant of the Snowy Mountain and The Young Flying Fox by Jin Yong
- Directed by: Johnnie To; Benny Chan; Tse Yi-man; Kuk Kwok-leung; Wong Kam-tin
- Starring: Ray Lui; Angie Chiu; Margie Tsang; Rebecca Chan; Kenneth Tsang; Patrick Tse; Elaine Chow; Flora King
- Theme music composer: Joseph Koo
- Opening theme: "The Flying Fox of Snowy Mountain" (雪山飛狐) by David Lui and Susanna Kwan
- Country of origin: Hong Kong
- Original language: Cantonese
- No. of episodes: 40

Production
- Producer: Wong Tin-lam
- Production location: Hong Kong
- Running time: ≈45 minutes per episode
- Production company: TVB

Original release
- Network: TVB
- Release: 14 October – 6 December 1985

The Flying Fox of Snowy Mountain (雪山飛狐) is a Hong Kong wuxia television series adapted from the novels Fox Volant of the Snowy Mountain and The Young Flying Fox by Jin Yong. It was first broadcast on TVB in 1985.

== Cast ==
- Ray Lui as Hu Fei / Hu Yidao
- Angie Chiu as Ma Chunhua
- Margie Tsang as Miao Ruolan
- Rebecca Chan as Nan Lan
- Kenneth Tsang as Tian Guinong / Tian Anbao
- Patrick Tse as Miao Renfeng / Miao Jiayun
- Wong Wan-choi as Fuk'anggan / Chen Jialuo
- Jaime Chik as Hu Yidao's wife
- Lee Hoi-sang as Tang Pei
- Elaine Chow as Yuan Ziyi
- Flora King as Cheng Lingsu
- Lung Tin-sang as Ping Asi
- Benz Hui as Yan Ji
- Shih Kien as Shang Jianming
- Law Lan as Lady Shang
- Eddie Kwan as Shang Baozhen
- Yeung Chak-lam as Feng Tiannan
- Cheung Ying-choi as Wang Wuchen
- Felix Lok as Shi Wanchen
- Lau Kong as Li Zicheng
- Lau Dan as Wu Sangui
- Chun Wong as Zhao Banshan
- Amy Hu as Luo Bing
- Hung Tung-leung as Wen Tailai
- Pui Wun as Fuk'anggan's mother
- Lee Kwok-lun as Xu Zheng
- Ma Hing-sang as Murong Jingyue
- Tsui Kwong-lam as Jiang Tieshan
- Chan Yuk-lun as Xue Que
- Ng Man-tat as the Miao family's ancestor
- Kam Kwok-wai as the Hu family's ancestor
- Chan Wing-chun as the Tian family's ancestor
- So Hon-sang as the Fan family's ancestor
- Sean Lau as the Hu family ancestor's son
- Bau Fong as Du Ximeng
- Wong Mun-wai as Du Ximeng's wife
- Ko Miu-see as Yuan Yingu
- Lee Shu-ka as Zhou Wenyang
- Lam Tin as Ma Xingkong
- Lau Kwok-shing as Wang Jianying
- Mak Ho-wai as Wang Jianjie
- Yip Tin-hang as Liu Yuanhe
- Chu Kong as Tao Baisui
- Kwan Cheuk-yuen as Tao Zi'an
- Suen Gwai-hing as Zhong Asi
- Chan Kar-yee as Zhong Asi's wife
- Ho Kwai-lam as Feng Yiming
- Tsang Wai-ming as Liu Hezhen
- Lee Kin-chuen as Cao Yunqi
- Chu Tit-wo as Wang Tie'e
- Tam Yat-ching as Second Master Dong
- Chu Siu-bo as Tian Qingwen
- Tam Chuen-hing as Zeng Tie'ou
- Forest Chan as Ruan Shizhong
