= The Flying Fox of Snowy Mountain (1999 TV series) =

1999 Hong Kong TV series

- Official poster
- 雪山飛狐
- Genre: Wuxia
- Based on: Fox Volant of the Snowy Mountain and The Young Flying Fox by Jin Yong
- Starring: Sunny Chan; Charmaine Sheh; Felix Wong; Maggie Shiu; Joyce Tang; Marco Ngai
- Opening theme: "Love You Until I Don't Feel Pain" (愛你愛到不知痛) by Jacky Cheung
- Ending theme: "You Are My Four Seasons" (你是我的春夏秋冬) by Jacky Cheung
- Country of origin: Hong Kong
- Original language: Cantonese
- No. of episodes: 40

Production
- Executive producer: Lee Tim-shing
- Production location: Hong Kong
- Running time: ≈45 minutes per episode
- Production company: TVB

Original release
- Network: TVB
- Release: 18 January – 12 March 1999

Title screen shot

The Flying Fox of the Snowy Mountain (雪山飛狐) is a Hong Kong wuxia television series adapted from the novels Fox Volant of the Snowy Mountain and The Young Flying Fox by Jin Yong. The series was first broadcast on TVB in Hong Kong in 1999.

== Synopsis ==
In 1644, the Ming general Wu Sangui defected to the Manchu-led Qing dynasty and opened Shanhai Pass for the Qing invaders. Li Zicheng, the rebel leader who had overthrown the Ming dynasty, had four warriors serving under him: Miao, Fan, Tian and Hu. Besieged by Qing forces, Li Zicheng left Hu behind to protect him, while the other three warriors fought their way out to seek reinforcements. After the battle, Li Zicheng went missing while Hu pledged allegiance to Wu Sangui. The other three warriors, thinking that Hu had betrayed their lord and joined Wu Sangui, sought to kill Hu. Unknown to them, Hu was serving as a spy in Wu Sangui's camp and waiting for the chance to help Li Zicheng return to power.

For generations, Hu's descendants have been constantly attacked by their counterparts from the other three families. Hu Yidao tries to resolve the misunderstanding and instead witnesses the Miaos, Fans and Tians killing each other while fighting over a treasure hoard left behind by Li Zicheng. He leaves a note of what he saw, and retires from the jianghu with his lover Lang Jianqiu to lead a peaceful life.

Tian Guinong instigates a duel to the death between Hu Yidao and Miao Renfeng, secretly smearing poison on Miao's sword and causing Hu to die of poisoning after Miao inflicted a minor cut on him. Before dying, Lang Jianqiu entrusts her son Hu Fei to the care of the loyal servant Ping Asi, imploring Ping to remind Hu Fei to seek justice for his parents when he grows up.

Ping Asi, misunderstanding that Miao Renfeng is responsible for Hu Yidao and Lang Jianqiu's deaths, raises Hu Fei and orders the boy to learn martial arts so that he can kill Miao and avenge his parents. Years later, a grown-up Hu Fei hones his fighting abilities and matures through his experiences, becoming a highly-regarded hero nicknamed "Flying Fox of the Snowy Mountain". Throughout this time, he also meets three women and starts romantic relationships with each of them: Yao Yiyi, a young hooligan who disguises herself as a man; Nie Sangqing, a young lady from a farming village; and Miao Ruolan, Miao Renfeng's daughter.

The grand finale is a duel between Hu Fei and Miao Renfeng on a snowy mountain.

== Cast ==
- Sunny Chan as Hu Fei
- Charmaine Sheh as Miao Ruolan
- Felix Wong as Hu Yidao / Hu Tian
- Maggie Shiu as Lang Jianqiu
- Marco Ngai as Fuk'anggan / Chen Jialuo / the Qianlong Emperor
- Joyce Tang as Nie Sangqing
- Bell Liew as Yao Yiyi
- Wan Yeung-ming as Miao Renfeng / Miao Qing
- Eddie Cheung as Tian Guinong / Tian Ming
- Jo Jo as Nan Lan
- Cheung Ying-choi as Nan Rentong
- Cheng Ka-sang as Fan Xinghan / Fan Guang
- Gordon Liu as Shi Wanchen
- Wong Chun-tong as Shang Jianming
- Chan On-ying as Lady Shang
- Yung Kam-cheung as Shang Baozhen
- Lau Kong as Yan Ji / Baoshu
- Liu Kai-chi as Ping Asi
- Kwan Ching as Taoist Wuchen
- Chun Wong as Zhao Banshan
- Kwong Tso-fai as Wen Tailai
- Fung Hiu-man as Luo Bing
- Chan Wing-chun as Chang Hezhi
- Yu Tin-wai as Chang Bozhi
- Li Kong as Yu Yutong
- Leung See-ho as Xinyan
- Bau Fong as Master Wuchen
- Law Lan as Fuk'anggan's mother
- Henry Lo as Du Ximeng / Du Zheng
- Lee Wong-sang as Zhong Zhaowen
- Mak Ka-lun as Zhong Zhaoying
- Lee Ging-gong as Zhong Zhaoneng
- Felix Lok as Li Zicheng
- Law Lok-lam as Wu Sangui
- Tam Yat-ching as Xuankong
- Lo Kwok-wai as Xuanzhi
- Ling Hon as Qingxu
- Choi Kwok-hing as Tianxu
- Lau Kwai-fong as Jingyin
- Yu Miu-Lin as Huixin
- So Yan-chee as Huijing
- Alice Fung as Miaoyin
- Lee Hoi-sang as Sun Fuhu
- Yeung Tze-to as Jiang Tiesheng
- Yau Biu as Cao Yunqi
- Cheung Hon-bun as Zhou Yunyang
- Wong Chak-fung as Du Shiwu
- Fung Sui-chan as Du Shiwu's mother
- Lee Lung-kei as Tang Pei
- Wah Chung-nam as Hai Lanbi
- Tsang Kin-ming as Jiang Bailong
- Siu Cheuk-yiu as Jiang Baihu
- Fong Kit as Liu Yuanhe
- Cheung Hung-cheung as Nie Rufeng
- Yau Sing as Nie Xiufang
- Forest Chan as Master Wang

== International broadcast ==
The series was broadcast in India as Himgiri Ka Veer.
