= Double Tap (film) =

2000 Hong Kong film by Bruce Law

- Film poster
- Traditional Chinese: 鎗王
- Simplified Chinese: 枪王
- Hanyu Pinyin: Qiāng Wáng
- Jyutping: Ceong1 Wong4
- Directed by: Bruce Law
- Screenplay by: Yeung Sin-ling; Bruce Law; Lee Hau-shek; Yeung Chin-hung
- Story by: Joseph Cheung; Derek Yee
- Produced by: Derek Yee
- Starring: Leslie Cheung; Alex Fong; Ruby Wong; Monica Chan
- Cinematography: Venus Keung; Tony Cheung
- Edited by: Kwong Chi-leung
- Music by: Peter Kam; Anthony Chue
- Production companies: Film Unlimited; GH Pictures
- Distributed by: Golden Harvest
- Release date: 27 May 2000
- Running time: 96 minutes
- Country: Hong Kong
- Language: Cantonese
- Box office: HK$3,987,152

Double Tap (鎗王) is a 2000 Hong Kong action-thriller film directed by Bruce Law, and starring Leslie Cheung, Alex Fong, Monica Chan and Ruby Wong. It was hailed as one of Leslie Cheung's most memorable action films since A Better Tomorrow. The film was followed by two sequels, One Nite in Mongkok, released in 2004, and Triple Tap, released in 2010, both of which was directed by Derek Yee and features Fong reprising his role as Inspector Miu.

== Synopsis ==
Leslie Cheung plays Rick Pang, a shooting champion who is also a gun expert who tinkers with his pistols and modified its magazine to perfect his double tap technique of placing two shots in the same exact spot to maximize marksmanship in any competition.

In a shooting competition, he goes up against another experienced top cop who is just as comfortable on the pistols as Rick, named Miu. Unfortunately, the competition was marred by a depressed day trader, a friend of Miu, who lost much in the stock market and threatened the safety of the contest, wounding the shooting supervisor, another of Miu's friends. Rick was forced to kill him with his trademark double tap as the former approaches Colleen (Rick's girlfriend) and Vincent. Miu took note of this astounding technique in the post-mortem while Rick's experience from this encounter was strangely exciting to him and he discovers his lust for murdering others in cold blood.

As further murders were committed by an unknown gunman with the similar double tap technique, the list of possible candidates by the police was narrowed down to just a few candidates but Miu was utterly convinced that Rick was also behind all those heinous crimes and hauls him up for investigation. Although Rick was released after an interrogation (having had no solid evidence incriminating him), Miu continued to pursue him and pressurise Rick to an extent that the murderer was suddenly possessed by rage and decided to take the law in his own hands. Rick went to his favorite shooting range and lay in wait for his pursuers. Arming himself with live rounds for his modified pistol, he engaged in a fierce gunfight with the cops and escaped at the first possible opportunity.

It later transpired that Rick was indeed haunted by his earlier murder at the competition but his insatiable lust for murder was further fuelled by his obsession with the double tap technique as he sought to perfect it. Further, he has inadvertently discovered a new use for his pistols: to kill those who opposed him and those who pushed him to the brink.

== Cast and roles ==
- Leslie Cheung as Rick Pang (shooting champion turned rogue by a mentally disturbing shooting accident)
- Alex Fong as Miu Chi-sun (Rick's chief competitor and nemesis)
- Ruby Wong as Colleen (Rick's girlfriend)
- Vincent Kok as Vincent (gun enthusiast)
- Joseph Man Kwong Cheung as Joe (shooting competitor)
- Monica Chan as Ellen (Miu's wife who is also a doctor)
