= The Flying Fox of Snowy Mountain (1991 TV series) =

1991 Taiwanese TV series

- intertitle
- 雪山飛狐
- Genre: Wuxia
- Based on: Fox Volant of the Snowy Mountain and The Young Flying Fox by Jin Yong
- Directed by: Li Chao-yung
- Starring: Meng Fei; Mimi Kung; Wu Yujuan; Mu Sicheng; Tong Chun-chung; Wang Luyao
- Opening theme: "Romance in the Snow" (雪中情) by Alex Yeung
- Ending theme: "Dream Chaser" (追夢人) by Fong Fei-fei
- Country of origin: Taiwan
- Original language: Mandarin
- No. of episodes: 40

Production
- Producer: Chou Yu
- Production location: Taiwan
- Running time: ≈45 minutes per episode
- Production company: TTV

Original release
- Network: TTV Main Channel
- Release: 1991 – 1991

The Flying Fox of Snowy Mountain (雪山飛狐) is a Taiwanese wuxia television series adapted from the novels Fox Volant of the Snowy Mountain and The Young Flying Fox by Jin Yong. The series was first broadcast on TTV in Taiwan in 1991.

== Cast ==
- Meng Fei as Hu Fei / Hu Yidao
- Mimi Kung as Cheng Lingsu / Bing Xue'er
- Wu Yujuan as Yuan Ziyi / Yuan Yingu
- Mu Sicheng as Miao Renfeng
- Tong Chun-chung as Tian Guinong
- Wang Luyao as Miao Ruolan
- Lü Ying-ying as Ma Chunhua
- Lin Wei as Fuk'anggan / Chen Jialuo
- Yuan Chia-pei as Nan Lan
- Wang Shang as Shang Baozhen
- Liang Pei-yu as Tian Qingwen
- Yu Yunhe as Cao Yunqi
- Wu Chiang-po as Tao Zi'an
- Chin Ying-chun as Xue He
- Kuan Yung as Ping Si
- Li Chieh as Li Zicheng
- Chang Shao-pin as Zhao Banshan
- Han Feng as Luo Bing
- Chao Kui as Taoist Wuchen
- Yang Hsuen as Hu / Murong Jingyue
- Fu Ke-li as Fan
- Kao Chen-peng as Wuzhen
- Ma Ching-yuen as Shi Wanshen
- Mu Huai-wei as Wu Sangui
