= Yuen Qiu =

Hong Kong actress, martial artist, and stuntwoman

- 元秋
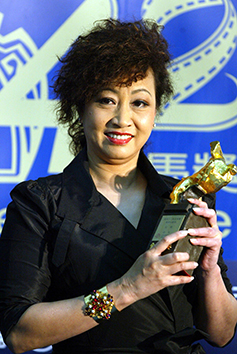
- Yuen in 2005
- Born: Cheung Cheun Nam (張轉男); April 19, 1950 (age 76); British Hong Kong
- Education: Peking Opera School
- Occupations: Actress; martial artist; stuntwoman
- Spouse: Lu Chun-koo (m. 1985; div. 1995)
- Children: 2
- Family: Candy Man Suet Yee (sister)
- Awards: 2005 Won Golden Horse Awards as Best Supporting Actress in Kung Fu Hustle; 2006 Won Hundred Flowers Award for Best Supporting Actress in Kung Fu Hustle

Cheung Cheun-Nam, known professionally as Yuen Qiu (Chinese: 元秋; born 19 April 1950), is a Hong Kong actress and martial artist. She is an expert of both Chinese martial arts and Beijing-opera skills, and was apprenticed at the Peking Opera School under Yu Jim-yuen, the same master as Jackie Chan and Sammo Hung.

== Early life ==
On 19 April 1950, Yuen was born as Cheung Cheun-Nam in Hong Kong. Yuen was given the performance name of Yuen Qiu.

== Education ==
Yuen attended a Peking Opera School in Kowloon, Hong Kong.

== Career ==
Yuen was a stuntwoman and a night club performer from the late 1960s to early 1970s.

In 1974, Yuen had a small role in the international production, The Man with the Golden Gun (1974), portraying as Hip's niece Nara rescuing Roger Moore as James Bond.

In 1979, Yuen was able to demonstrate her acrobatic and kicking abilities in Dragon's Claw. In 1970s, there were limited opportunities for stuntwomen.

After being away from the Hong Kong film industry for nearly 20 years, she landed a role in Kung Fu Hustle only by chance. She was accompanying a friend from the China Drama Academy at the audition but the director's eye was on her. It was reported that Stephen Chow convinced her to take on the role only after unremitting and persistent persuasion.

Yuen later appeared in the movie Kung Fu Mahjong, with Yuen Wah, and has been active in cinema since then.

== Personal life ==
In 1985, Yuen was married to martial arts director Lu Chun-koo (魯俊谷). Together they have a son and a daughter. Yuen and Lu divorced in 1995.

On 31 March 2005, Yuen was arrested along with 10 other women and two men for illegal gambling.

== Filmography ==
Year	Title	Role	Notes/Ref.
1972	Intimate Confessions of a Chinese Courtesan	Stuntman	
1973	Police Woman		
1973	Return to China		
1973	The Heroine		
1974	The Man with the Golden Gun	Nara (Hip's Niece #1)	Uncredited
1975	The Black Dragon's Revenge		
1975	Death of Bruce Lee		
1978	The Angry Dragon		
1978	The Deadly Silver Ninja		
1979	The Dragon's Snake Fist	Phoenix Kim	
1979	Dragon's Claws		
1979	Fearless Duo		
1981	Dreadnaught	White Tiger's wife	
1983	Bastard Swordsman	Rain	
1984	Long Road to Gallantry		
1984	New Tales of the Flying Fox	Hu Yidao's wife	
1985	Disciples of the 36th Chamber		
1985	Crazy Shaolin Disciples	Miu Tsui-Fa	
2004	Kung Fu Hustle	Landlady	Golden Horse Awards for Best Supporting Actress; Hundred Flowers Awards for Best Supporting Actress; Nominated - Hong Kong Film Award for Best Actress; Nominated - Satellite Award for Best Supporting Actress – Motion Picture Comedy or Musical
2005	Kung Fu Mahjong	Auntie Fei	
2005	Kung Fu Mahjong 2	Auntie Fei	
2006	My Kung Fu Sweetheart	Dolina	
2006	I'll Call You	Manny's Mom	
2007	Kung Fu Mahjong 3: The Final Duel	Auntie Toni	
2007	The Lady Iron Chef	Ching Har	
2008	The Luckiest Man	Sophie	
2008	Desires of the Heart	Gao Yajuan	
2009	Looking for Jackie		Cameo
2010	A Fistful of Stances	Au-Yeung Wai-Lan	TV series
2011	A Simple Life		
2013	Tales from the Dark 1	Restaurant owner	
2014	Queen Divas	Wong Lin-hing	TV series
2014	Delete My Love	So Fa	
2015	Wudang Rules	Mo Yee-shan	TV series
2015	Imprisoned: Survival Guide for Rich and Prodigal		Guest star
2015	Wild City	Mona	
2016	From Vegas to Macau III		
2016	The Bodyguard		
2016	A Fist Within Four Walls	Yuk Bo-fung	TV series
2019	We Are Legends		
2019	Return of the Lucky Stars		
TBD	Lost But Win		

== See also ==
- Yu Jim-yuen
- Wuxia film
