= Fox Volant of the Snowy Mountain (2006 TV series) =

2006 Hong Kong–Chinese TV series

- VCD cover art
- Also known as: Flying Fox of the Snowy Mountain
- 雪山飞狐
- Genre: Wuxia
- Based on: Fox Volant of the Snowy Mountain and The Young Flying Fox by Jin Yong
- Directed by: Andrew Lau; Tam Yau-yip
- Starring: Nie Yuan; Gillian Chung; Athena Chu; Ady An; Alex Fong; Anthony Wong; Patrick Tam
- Opening theme: "Love is Tough Yet Blissful" (爱的辛苦，却也幸福) by Ding Wei; "Farewell in the Snow" (雪的道別) by Athena Chu
- Ending theme: "Legend" (传说) by Nie Yuan
- Composer: Ruan Kunshen
- Countries of origin: Hong Kong; China
- Original language: Mandarin
- No. of episodes: 40

Production
- Producer: Wong Jing
- Production location: China
- Running time: ≈45 minutes per episode
- Production companies: ATV; TVB; Ciwen Pictures

Original release
- Network: ATV; TVB
- Release: 2006 – 2006

Fox Volant of the Snowy Mountain (雪山飞狐) is a 2006 Hong Kong–Chinese wuxia television series adapted from the novels Fox Volant of the Snowy Mountain and The Young Flying Fox by Jin Yong. Directed by Andrew Lau and Tam Yau-yip, the series is a co-production by the Hong Kong stations ATV and TVB and mainland China's Ciwen Pictures, with Wong Jing as producer, starring Nie Yuan, Athena Chu, Gillian Chung, Ady An, Alex Fong, Anthony Wong and Patrick Tam. It was first broadcast in Hong Kong on ATV in 2006.

== Synopsis ==
The plot generally follows the novels but some changes were introduced to create links between the novels and the Condor Trilogy, another set of novels by Jin Yong. Tian Guinong is given a greater role as the primary villain - he survives the fall after being knocked off a cliff by Hu Fei and returns as an even more powerful foe. Apparently, Tian has discovered Li Zicheng's treasure in a cave and found a martial arts manual about Zhou Botong's "Technique of Ambidexterity", along with the reforged Heaven Sword and Dragon Saber. He masters the skill and uses his new weapons to face the heroes in battle once more. Characters from The Book and the Sword are also given greater roles in the series. The cliffhanger ending in the novel is also replaced by a happy reunion for Hu Fei and Miao Ruolan.

== Cast ==
- Nie Yuan as Hu Fei
  - Ye Zilong as Hu Fei (child)
- Anthony Wong as Hu Yidao
- Athena Chu as Yuan Ziyi
- Gillian Chung as Cheng Lingsu
- Ady An as Miao Ruolan
  - Lin Jing as Miao Ruolan (child)
  - Zhang Yijing as Miao Ruolan (preteen)
- Alex Fong as Miao Renfeng
- Patrick Tam as Tian Guinong
- Lü Yi as Nan Lan
- Zhang Tong as Hu Yidao's wife
- Gao Hu as Ping Asi
- Ren Yuanyuan as Ma Chunhua
- Wu Qingzhe as Chen Jialuo / Fuk'anggan
- Zheng Qiang as the Qianlong Emperor
- Chen Jiajia as Xue Que
- Wang Zhiqiang as Taoist Wuchen
- Dong Zhihua as Zhao Banshan
- Sang Weilin as Wen Tailai
- Meng Fanlong as Chang Bozhi
- Wang Yunsheng as Chang Hezhi
- Jin Peng as Xu Tianhong
- Tong Shanshan as Luo Bing
- Chen Youwang as Yuan Shixiao
- Li Guohua as Feng Tiannan
- Hai Yan as Lady Shang
- Liu Yanyu as Shang Baozhen
- Xia Yang as Fan Changfeng
- Wang Bin as Fan Changjiang
- Ma Weifu as Yan Ji
- Zhao Jian as Nan Rentong
- Kang Shaoying as Nan Zhique
- Ding Guanghe as Wang Jianying
- Yang Xing as Wang Jianjie
- Liu Tiexin as Tao Baisui
- Fei Weitao as Miao Fu
- Tian Yi as Lü Xiaomei
- Bo Guanjun as Ma Xingkong
- Wang Pengkai as Xu Zheng
- Kang Xueqing as Xiaoqi
- Wang Weinan as Feng Yiming
- Li Zhenqi as Li Zicheng
- Lu Donglai as Liu Hezhen
