= Police Woman (film) =

1973 Hong Kong film by Hdeng Tsu

- Deceptive DVD cover intended to pass off the film as a "Jackie Chan movie"
- Traditional Chinese: 女警察
- Simplified Chinese: 女警察
- Hanyu Pinyin: Nu jing cha
- Jyutping: Nui ging chaat
- Directed by: Chu Mu
- Written by: Chu Mu
- Produced by: Chu Mu; Wei Hai-feng
- Starring: Lin Chiu; Charlie Chin
- Edited by: Vincent Leung
- Music by: Chou Fu-liang
- Distributed by: Great Earth Film Company
- Release date: 26 April 1973
- Running time: 72 minutes
- Country: Hong Kong
- Language: Mandarin
- Box office: HK$287,494

Police Woman (Chinese: 女警察, released in the United States as Rumble in Hong Kong) is a 1973 Hong Kong crime film written and directed by Chu Mu (credited as Hdeng Tsu) and produced with Wei Hai-feng. The film stars Lin Chiu and Charlie Chin. It also casts Jackie Chan in a supporting role. The film is also known as Young Tiger. The film was released theatrically in Hong Kong on 26 April 1973.

== Plot ==
Chin Chen, a Hong Kong taxi driver, picks up Ho Mei Fong, a woman on the run from a gang of criminals. She dies suddenly and mysteriously in his back seat, but not before hiding her purse in the taxi. Now, the gang members begin to torment Chen, hoping he will hand over the purse, despite Chen being completely unaware of it.

Chen is visited by a woman claiming to Mei Fong's sister and looking for the purse. Days later, the dead woman's real sister, Police Inspector Ho Wai Ma, visits Chen and reveals that she had not spoken to her sister in years as she had become involved in the criminal underworld. The pair decide to team up to find Mei Fong's killers and bring them to justice.

The impostor turns out to be Sao Mei, who also works for the gang's evil boss. Chen witnesses her being kidnapped by the thugs and follows them to their hideout, joined by Wai Ma. However, both heroes are captured by the villains. Locked in a room together, Sao Mei reveals the truth to Wai Ma. The boss recruits attractive young women, such as Sao Mei and Mei Fong, to become drug smugglers for him. However, Mei Fong became desperate to escape and took photos of the mole-faced gang leader planting a car bomb which subsequently killed a man. The gangsters become aware of this and force her to drink poison. Secretly assisted by Sao Mei, Mei Fong escapes the hideout with the incriminating evidence hidden in her purse. Tragically, she did not make it to the hospital in time and died in Chen's taxi.

Chen, Wai Ma and Sao Mei manage to escape from their holdings and fight off their captors, then summon the police and Chen's fellow taxi drivers to their location. The criminals try to escape, but in a final brawl, Chen defeats the gang leader and retrieves Mei Fong's purse from his taxi. The evidence and the villains are then handed over to the police.

== Cast ==
- Lin Chiu as Inspector Ho Wai-ma
- Charlie Chin as Chin Chen
- Jackie Chan as Mole Face Gang Leader
- Hu Chin (actress) as Ho Mei-fong
- Chu Mu (credited as Hdeng Tsu) as Car Bomb Victim
- Fung Yi as Inspector Fung
- Helena Law as Taxi Dispatcher
- John Cheung Ng long as Thug
- Mang Ding-goh as Thug
- Ho Gwong-ming as Thug
- Yeh Tien-hsing as Thug
- Li Wen-tai as Yuen Tai-heng
- Betty Pei Ti as Sao Mei
- Chiang Nan as Boss
- Go Yeung as Taxi Company Owner
- Michelle Yim as Girl harassed in park
- Yuen Cheung-yan as Extra / Stunt
- Chan Keung

== Production ==
It is set and filmed in Hong Kong in 35 days on 8 June – 13 July 1972.

== Home media ==
American Home video companies like Xenon Entertainment Group and Madacy Entertainment released the film on video in the early 2000s as Rumble In Hong Kong. Clearly this was an attempt to capitalize on Jackie Chan's recent popularity in the west thanks to the release of Rumble in the Bronx and other films.

On 17 September 2001, DVD was released by Prism Leisure Corporation at the United Kingdom in Region 2.

== See also ==
- Jackie Chan filmography
- List of crime films of the 1970s
- List of Hong Kong films of 1973
- List of Hong Kong films
