= Lost but Win =

Upcoming Chinese film

- Film poster
- Traditional Chinese: 風速極戰
- Simplified Chinese: 风速极战
- Hanyu Pinyin: Fēng Sù Jí Zhàn
- Jyutping: Fung1 Cuk1 Gik6 Zin3
- Directed by: Xin Zhao
- Produced by: Yang Rui
- Starring: Michael Tse; Jason Chu; Jerry Lamb; Yuen Wah; Yuen Qiu
- Production companies: Tencent Pictures; Shenzhen Kunbaode Media Culture; Shenzhen Xiaobao Pictures; Capricorn Films (Beijing) Media Culture
- Distributed by: Beijing QiTai Culture&Media
- Release date: 26 May 2024
- Running time: 90 minutes
- Country: China
- Language: Mandarin

Lost but Win is a 2024 Chinese action drama film directed by Xin Zhao and starring Michael Tse, Jason Chu, Jerry Lamb, Yuen Wah and Yuen Qiu. Touted as China's first motorcycling racing film, the film began production on 20 September 2020.

The film was released for streaming on 26 May 2024 on Tencent Video, iQiyi and Youku.

== Plot ==
Fifteen years ago, Tong (Jason Chu) left the motorcycling racing team and today, his teammate Wah (Michael Tse) has become a champion. Tong returns on the race circuit and challenges Wah to take the championship but loses since Wah has been honing his skills every single day for the past 15 years. Thus, Tong works hard to mentor and pass on his skills to a gifted racer, Hau-yung.

== Cast ==
- Michael Tse as Wah (阿華)
- Jason Chu as Tong (阿棠)
- Jerry Lamb as Fung (阿峯)
- Yuen Wah as Master (師父)
- Yuen Qiu as Madam (師孃)

== Production ==
Producer Yang Rui revealed that the script for Lost But Win took three years to develop. Touted as China's first motorcycling racing film, production for Lost But Win was due to begin in March 2020, but was postponed as a result of the COVID-19 pandemic. Principal photography for the film officially began on 20 September 2020 and will be filmed throughout the Guangdong-Hong Kong-Macau Greater Bay Area.

On 3 October 2020, the film held a production commencement ceremony at the Zhuhai International Circuit where the cast and crew attended. At the event, Michael Tse revealed that he sought advice from a real motorcycling racing champion and diligently lost weight in order to convincing portray the role of a professional motorcycling racer.

On 29 October 2020, the film held a press conference in Shenzhen where over 600 people attended, including the cast and crew, fans, motorcycle lovers and news reporters, where producer Yang introduced every crew member to the press, as well as explaining the production progress the clever integration of the filming locations of Shenzhen, Zhuhai and Macau.

== Release ==
Lost but Win was released for streaming on 26 May 2024 on Tencent Video, iQiyi and Youku.

== See also ==
- Yuen Wah filmography
- List of biker films
