= Fox Volant of the Snowy Mountain =

1959 wuxia novel by Jin Yong

- Cover of the 1977 edition of the novel
- Author: Jin Yong
- Original title: 雪山飛狐
- Translator: Olivia Mok
- Language: Chinese
- Genre: Wuxia
- Publisher: New Evening Post, Chinese University Press
- Publication date: 1959
- Publication place: Hong Kong
- English publication date: 1996
- Media type: Print
- ISBN: 9786263615939
- Preceded by: The Young Flying Fox

Fox Volant of the Snowy Mountain
- Traditional Chinese: 雪山飛狐
- Simplified Chinese: 雪山飞狐
Transcriptions
Standard Mandarin
- Hanyu Pinyin: Xuě Shān Fēi Hú
Yue: Cantonese
- Jyutping: Syut^{3} Saan^{1} Fei^{1} Wu^{4}

Fox Volant of the Snowy Mountain (雪山飛狐), also known as Flying Fox of Snowy Mountain, is a wuxia novel by Jin Yong (Louis Cha). It was first serialised between 9 February and 18 June 1959 in the Hong Kong newspaper New Evening Post.

Flying Fox of Snowy Mountain is one of Jin Yong's shortest novels, with only 10 chapters. These are numbered instead of having short phrases or duilian as chapter headings, as was Jin Yong's usual style. This is chronologically the latest of Jin Yong's works, being set in the late 18th century during the Qing dynasty.

A prequel, The Young Flying Fox, was released in 1960.

== Structure ==
Fox Volant of the Snowy Mountain is unique in structure among Jin Yong's novels because it employs a frame narrative as well as the literary devices of unreliable narrators and storytelling flashbacks. The actual time frame of the novel lasts only a day, but the stories encapsulated in it stretch back months, years and even decades before.

In the revised afterword to the novel, Jin Yong mentions that he did not draw inspiration from Akira Kurosawa's 1950 film Rashomon as many people had falsely assumed. The literary devices used in the novel have been used very often in literature, such as in One Thousand and One Nights and Illustrious Words to Instruct the World.

== Plot summary ==
The story is set in the Changbai Mountains in 18th-century China during the Qing dynasty. It follows the classical unity of time, taking place on a single day: the 15th day of the third month of the 45th year of the reign of the Qianlong Emperor, which corresponds to 19 April 1780 in the Gregorian calendar.

A group of martial artists unearth a treasure chest and begin fighting for it. Midway during their tussle, they are overpowered and coerced by a highly-skilled monk, Baoshu, to travel to a manor at the top of Jade Brush Peak to help the manor's owner drive away an enemy, "Fox Volant of the Snowy Mountain" Hu Fei. They start telling stories concerning the origin of a precious saber in the chest and their mysterious foe. In doing so, they gradually reveal each other's personal secrets.

The saber's story dates back over a century ago to a longstanding feud among four warriors serving under Li Zicheng, who had led the rebellion that overthrew the Ming dynasty. The four warriors' family names were Hu, Miao, Tian and Fan. Owing to a massive misunderstanding which lasted several generations, their descendants have been stuck in a vicious cycle of revenge that prevented any of them from uncovering the truth. The Hu family was opposed to those from the Miao, Tian and Fan families; the latter three were allies.

The people gathered at the manor are either descendants of the four warriors or are otherwise involved in the feud in some way. Hu Fei's father, Hu Yidao, met Miao Renfeng, a descendant of the Miao family. Both were masterful swordsmen without peer. Miao, Hu and Hu's wife developed an uncommon friendship and grew to admire each other, but Hu and Miao must fight unwilling duels to avenge their parents' deaths. In a scheme orchestrated by the villainous Tian Guinong of the Tian family, Hu was unintentionally slain by Miao when Tian secretly smeared Miao's sword with poison. The Hus' infant son, Hu Fei, was rescued and raised by a waiter, Ping Asi, whose life Hu Yidao once saved. Hu Fei grew up and became a powerful martial artist nicknamed "Fox Volant of the Snowy Mountain".

The various scheming martial artists are eventually punished by their greed. Hu Fei makes an appearance midway in the story.

The conflict reaches a climax when Miao Renfeng challenges Hu Fei to a duel after mistakenly believing that Hu had molested his daughter, Miao Ruolan. They fight for several rounds but neither emerges the victor. They are stranded on a cliff about to collapse under their weight when the novel ends. Hu has an opportunity to attack Miao and knock him off the cliff, but he hesitates because Miao might become his future father-in-law. However, if he does not attack, either they will fall to their deaths or Miao will kill him. The novel ends on a deliberate cliffhanger and leaves the conclusion to the reader's imagination.

== Principal characters ==
- Hu Fei (胡斐), nicknamed "Fox Volant of the Snowy Mountain" (雪山飛狐) – the protagonist and Hu Yidao's son.
- Hu Yidao (胡一刀) – a legendary swordsman from Liaodong who befriended Miao Renfeng despite their ancestors' longstanding feud. He died of poisoning after his duel with Miao when Miao inflicted a minor cut on him, not knowing that Tian Guinong had secretly smeared poison on Miao's sword.
- Miao Renfeng (苗人鳳) – a formidable and reputable swordsman nicknamed "Golden Faced Buddha" (金面佛) who forged a friendship with Hu Yidao despite their ancestors' longstanding feud. After unintentionally killing Hu Yidao in a duel, he has been feeling guilty about it all these years.
- Miao Ruolan (苗若蘭) – Miao Renfeng's daughter who has been forbidden to learn martial arts by her father. She meets and falls in love with Hu Fei.
- Tian Guinong (田歸農) – a martial artist who descends from the Tian family. A scheming and unscrupulous villain, he plots to kill Hu Yidao and Miao Renfeng in a bid to improve his own social status.
- Ping Asi (平阿四) – a young waiter whose life had been saved by Hu Yidao. He rescued the infant Hu Fei and raised him to repay Hu Yidao's kindness. A humble and shy man, he always feels inferior to others.
- Nan Lan (南蘭) – Miao Renfeng's wife and Miao Ruolan's mother. She was born in an aristocratic family so she is spoiled and extravagant. After her marriage to Miao Renfeng, she cannot cope with his frugal lifestyle so she leaves him and marries Tian Guinong.

== Adaptations ==
=== Films ===
Year	Production	Main cast	Additional information
1964	Emei Film Company (Hong Kong)	Chiang Han, Pearl Au, Lee Yuet-ching, Shih Kien	See The Flying Fox in the Snowy Mountains
1978	CTV (Hong Kong)	Barry Chan, Jason Pai, Law Lok-lam, Michelle Yim, Wen Hsueh-erh, Lee Tong-ming	See The Flying Fox of Snowy Mountain (1978 film)
2022	iQiyi (Mainland China)	Zhao Huawei, Chen Yusi, Ray Lui, Chen Zihan, Yang Yi	See The Hidden Fox

=== Television ===
Many of the television adaptations combine the plots of Fox Volant of the Snowy Mountain and The Young Flying Fox.

Year	Production	Main cast	Additional information
1985	TVB (Hong Kong)	Ray Lui, Patrick Tse, Kenneth Tsang, Rebecca Chan, Chow Sau-lan, King Doi-yum, Margie Tsang	See The Flying Fox of Snowy Mountain (1985 TV series)
1991	TTV (Taiwan)	Meng Fei, Mini Kung, Mu Sicheng, Tong Chun-chung, Wu Yujuan, Wang Luyao	See The Flying Fox of Snowy Mountain (1991 TV series)
1999	TVB (Hong Kong)	Sunny Chan, Felix Wong, Wan Yeung-ming, Cheung Siu-fai, Maggie Siu, Charmaine Sheh, Joyce Tang	See The Flying Fox of Snowy Mountain (1999 TV series)
2006	ATV (Hong Kong)	Nie Yuan, Gillian Chung, Athena Chu, Ady An, Patrick Tam, Alex Fong, Anthony Wong	See Fox Volant of the Snowy Mountain (2006 TV series)
2022	Tencent Video (China)	Qin Jun Jie, Liang Jie, Xing Fei, Lin Yu Shen, Peter Ho, Ye Xiang Ming, Ray Lui, Leanne Liu	See Side Story of Fox Volant (2022 TV series)

=== Radio ===
In 1981, Hong Kong's RTHK made a 15 episodes radio drama based on the novel.

=== Video games ===
Hu Fei was a playable character in the 2008 PC fighting game Street Fighter Online: Mouse Generation.

== Translations ==
An English translation by Olivia Mok was published in 1993, and a second edition came out in 1996.
