= Tong Kai =

Hong Kong film director (1937–2025)

Tong Kai (Chinese: 唐佳; 7 January 1937 – 23 June 2025), also known as Tang Chia, once known as Wong Tong (黃唐) and also known as Huang Longji (黃龍基), was a Hong Kong martial arts instructor, actor and director.

== Early life and career ==
Tong was born in Macau to a nautical family. In his early years, he was taught by Yuan Xiaotian, later he joined Shaw Brothers Studio along with Lau Kar-leung.

Throughout his career, he directed a number of films, including Shaolin Prince (1982), Shaolin Intruders (1983), and Opium and the Kung-Fu Master (1984).

== Personal life and death ==
Kai was married to actress Suet Nei.

Kai died after falling from a building in Tsim Sha Tsui. He was 88. The incident was recorded as a suicide.

Kai's widow died from pancreatic cancer at age 79 on 3 July 2025, less than two weeks after her husband's death.
