= The Flying Fox of Snowy Mountain (1978 film) =

1978 Hong Kong television film by CTV

- 雪山飛狐
- Directed by: Siu Sang
- Based on: Fox Volant of the Snowy Mountain and The Young Flying Fox by Jin Yong
- Starring: Barry Chan; Michelle Yim; Wen Hsueh-erh; Lee Tong-ming; Jason Pai
- Production company: CTV
- Release date: March 1978
- Country: Hong Kong
- Language: Cantonese

The Flying Fox of Snowy Mountain (雪山飛狐) is a 1978 Hong Kong wuxia television film adapted from the novels Fox Volant of the Snowy Mountain and The Young Flying Fox by Jin Yong. The series was produced by CTV.

== Cast ==
- Barry Chan as Hu Fei / Hu Yidao
- Michelle Yim as Yuan Ziyi
- Wen Hsueh-erh as Cheng Lingsu
- Lee Tong-ming as Miao Ruolan
- Jason Pai as Miao Renfeng
- Law Lok-lam as Tian Guinong
- Lawrence Ng as Fuk'anggan / Chen Jialuo
- Helen Ma as Hu Yidao's wife
- Chun Wong as Zhao Banshan
- Cheng Lui as Yan Ji
