= One Nite in Mongkok =

2004 Hong Kong film by Derek Yee

- Film poster
- Directed by: Derek Yee
- Written by: Derek Yee
- Produced by: Henry Fong
- Starring: Daniel Wu; Cecilia Cheung; Alex Fong
- Cinematography: Venus Keung; Chan Wai-lin
- Edited by: Cheung Ka-fai
- Music by: Peter Kam
- Production companies: Sil-Metropole Organisation; Film Unlimited
- Distributed by: Universe Films Distribution
- Release date: 10 May 2004
- Running time: 108 minutes
- Country: Hong Kong
- Language: Cantonese
- Box office: HK$7,656,250

One Nite in Mongkok (Chinese: 旺角黑夜) is a 2004 Hong Kong crime drama film written and directed by Derek Yee and starring Daniel Wu, Cecilia Cheung and Alex Fong. The film is a sequel to the Yee-produced 2000 film Double Tap, with Fong reprising his role from the previous installment. A sequel to the film, Triple Tap, was released in 2010, which was once again directed by Yee and featured Fong reprising his role, while also starring Wu in a different role.

== Cast ==
- Daniel Wu as Lin Lai-fu
- Cecilia Cheung as Dandan
- Alex Fong as Milo / Miu Chi-sun
- Anson Leung as Beel
- Chin Ka-lok as Brandon
- Cha Chuen-yee as Head of Anti-vice Unit
- Alexander Chan as Wah
- Monica Chan as Milo's wife
- Paul Che as Shitty Kong
- Henry Fong as Carl
- Christie Fung as Sue
- Cynthia Ho as Jane
- Elena Kong as Nightclub Lady
- Lam Suet as Liu
- Lawrence Lau as Fatty – nightclub manager
- Sam Lee as Franky
- Ng Shui-ting as Kinson
- Paw Hee-ching as Volunteer helper at Sue's home
- Eddie Pang as Tiger
- Sun Limin as Tim
- Redbean Lau as Tim's wife
- Austin Wai as Milo's superior
- Ken Wong as Wilson

== Reception ==
Film critic Derek Elley praised the film as a "crackerjack crimer", seeing it as a return by Derek Yee to the grittier style of People’s Hero and "away from the gentler relationship movies for which he’s better known". Elley also noted the film being set during a "nervous period prior to Hong Kong’s handover to China", just before Christmas in 1996. In a paper for Western Sydney University, Hilary Hongjin He opined that this date was chosen to appease the censors for the film's mainland Chinese release, as it helped "pretend that all things bad happened in the ‘corrupted’ British Hong Kong era."

== Awards and nominations ==
Awards and nominations
Ceremony	Category	Recipient	Outcome
24th Hong Kong Film Awards	Best Film	One Nite in Mongkok	Nominated
24th Hong Kong Film Awards	Best Director	Derek Yee	Won
24th Hong Kong Film Awards	Best Screenplay	Derek Yee	Won
24th Hong Kong Film Awards	Best Actor	Alex Fong	Nominated
24th Hong Kong Film Awards	Best Actor	Daniel Wu	Nominated
24th Hong Kong Film Awards	Best Actress	Cecilia Cheung	Nominated
24th Hong Kong Film Awards	Best Cinematography	Venus Keung	Nominated
24th Hong Kong Film Awards	Best Film Editing	Cheung Ka-fai	Nominated
24th Hong Kong Film Awards	Best Action Choreography	Chin Ka-lok	Nominated
24th Hong Kong Film Awards	Best Original Film Score	Peter Kam	Nominated
24th Hong Kong Film Awards	Best Sound Design	Nip Kei-wing, Benny Chan	Nominated
41st Golden Horse Awards	Best Feature Film	One Nite in Mongkok	Nominated
41st Golden Horse Awards	Best Director	Derek Yee	Nominated
41st Golden Horse Awards	Best Cinematography	Venus Keung	Nominated
41st Golden Horse Awards	Best Action Choreography	Chin Ka-lok	Nominated
5th Chinese Film Media Awards	Best Film	One Nite in Mongkok	Nominated
5th Chinese Film Media Awards	Best Director	Derek Yee	Nominated
5th Chinese Film Media Awards	Best Actor	Alex Fong	Won
5th Chinese Film Media Awards	Best Actress	Cecilia Cheung	Nominated
14th Hong Kong Screenwriters' Guild	Best Screenplay	Derek Yee	Won
17th Hong Kong Film Directors' Guild	Most Outstanding Director	Derek Yee	Won
17th Hong Kong Film Directors' Guild	Most Recommended Film	One Nite in Mongkok	Won
11th Hong Kong Film Critics Society Award	Best Director	Derek Yee	Won
11th Hong Kong Film Critics Society Award	Film of Merit	One Nite in Mongkok	Won
4th Ming Pao Awards	Most Outstanding Film	One Nite in Mongkok	Won
4th Ming Pao Awards	Outstanding Behind the Scene Elite	Derek Yee	Nominated
