= Triple Tap =

2010 Hong Kong film by Derek Yee

- Film poster
- Directed by: Derek Yee
- Written by: Chun Tin-nam; Lau Ho-leung; Derek Yee
- Produced by: Henry Fong
- Starring: Louis Koo; Daniel Wu; Charlene Choi; Li Bingbing
- Cinematography: Anthony Pun
- Edited by: Kwong Chi-leung
- Music by: Peter Kam
- Production companies: Emperor Motion Pictures; Sil-Metropole Organisation; Beijing Poly-bona Film Publishing Company; Film Unlimited
- Distributed by: Emperor Motion Pictures
- Release date: 1 July 2010
- Running time: 118 minutes
- Country: Hong Kong
- Language: Cantonese
- Box office: US$1,522,727

Triple Tap (traditional Chinese: 鎗王之王; simplified Chinese: 枪王之王) is a 2010 Hong Kong action film directed by Derek Yee and starring Louis Koo and Daniel Wu. This film is a sequel to Yee's 2004 film One Nite in Mongkok, which starred Wu in a different role, and the Yee-produced 2000 film Double Tap, which starred Leslie Cheung and Alex Fong, the latter being only actor to reprise his role from both previous installments, but retaining a guest role.

== Plot ==
Champion competitive marksman Ken (Louis Koo) finishes an IPSC competition in the beginning, while suddenly comes across an armored van robbery. He sees a policeman held hostage and uses his race gun to shoot and kill four of the robbers. One of the robbers escapes and the policeman survives, who is in a coma. The case is handled by Jerry Chong (Daniel Wu), whom Ken knows from having recently beaten him in a shooting match. Ken is found not guilty in court. Soon after, Ken is attacked by the escaped robber Pang To (Chapman To). Their confrontation reveals a very different background story and brings about a myriad of lies and traps and changes in relationships as Jerry and Ken try to outsmart each other.

Pang To is revealed to have been working with Ken in a plan to rob the armored truck, as Ken is planning to steal funds from his company. His plan has gone awry, as while having been promoted as his company by his boss Anna (Li Bingbing), whom Ken has an affair with behind his wife Ting's (Charlene Choi) back, was the same night Pang attacked him. The next day, Ken learns his banker who was supposed to help him, has been arrested. Pang and Ken argue about the plan having gone sideways, especially since the robbers lost control and killed their inside man Fong (Lam Suet), during the robbery and how Pang is on the run from police. Another problem for them is the traffic cop Billy, who's in a coma, who witnessed the robbery and was shot by the robbers when he attempted to intervene. Pang offers to kill him in exchange he gets half the money, but when he attempts to kill him at the hospital, he fails and has to flee. Due to his failure, Ken executes Pang, in the guise of what seems to be him helping Pang flee with the money after the duo argue about how Pang will flee with the money before Pang threatens to rat Ken out in court and kill his wife Ting (Charlene Choi) and Anna.

Jerry on the other hand, struggles to find evidence against Ken for his involvement in the truck robbery, as Ken's psychology background allows him to manipulate the former into second guessing himself as the former can't cope with the fact he was beaten by Ken at the shooting competition. Jerry has to consult Milo (Alex Fong), who tells the former to get over his obsession to losing to Ken as it affects him being able to suspect Ken as the conspirator responsible for the truck robbery and tells him to actually get Ken to confess and admit the cop saw something he wasn't supposed to see. With the advice, Jerry comes up a plan. He asks Ting to say Billy is waking up, with Ken going to the hospital to kill Billy. When Ting witnesses Ken killing Billy, she then reveals that Billy was in fact on life support and that his family agreed to pull the plug already, the week before as he was brain dead, despite the protest of Billy's brother Warren, a sniper officer. Jerry takes Ting away and lures Ken outside, to a final match between the two set up by the police. Jerry and Ken shoot at each other, with the latter shooting only the bulletproof vest of the former, whilst the former has wounded the latter's arm. Unable to accept defeat as Ting and the police surround him, Ken attempts to aim for his gun again and is shot by Warren in the head, much to Ting's heartbreak. Billy is then given a funeral and Milo congratulates Jerry on being able to defeat Ken successfully as the two fish.

== Cast ==
- Louis Koo as Ken Kwan Yau-bok
- Daniel Wu as Jerry Chong Tze-wai
- Charlene Choi as Ting
- Li Bingbing as Anna
- Chapman To as Pang To
- Alex Fong as Milo Miu Chi-shun
- Lam Suet as Fong Chi-wo

== Release ==
The film was released in Hong Kong on 1 July 2010.

== Accolades ==
Ceremony	Category	Recipient	Result
30th Hong Kong Film Awards	Best Editing	Kwong Chi-leung	Nominated
