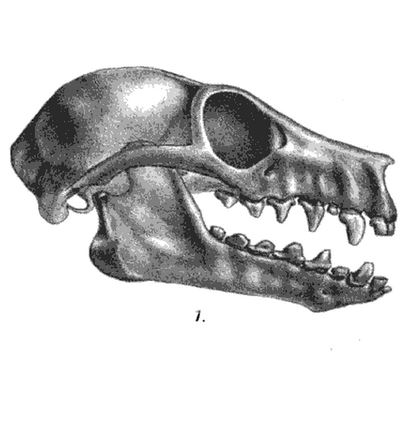

Scientific classification
- Kingdom: Animalia
- Phylum: Chordata
- Class: Mammalia
- Order: Chiroptera
- Family: Pteropodidae
- Subfamily: Pteropodinae
- Genus: Desmalopex; Miller, 1907

Species
- Desmalopex leucoptera Desmalopex microleucoptera

= Desmalopex =

Genus of bats

Desmalopex (known as the white-winged flying fox or mottled-winged flying fox) is a genus of megabats in the family Pteropodidae. It has historically been included in the genus Pteropus and occurs only in the Philippines.

It comprises the following species:

- White-winged flying fox, Desmalopex leucoptera
- Small white-winged flying fox, Desmalopex microleucoptera
