= Small white-winged flying fox =

Conservation status
- Endangered (IUCN 3.1)

Scientific classification
- Kingdom: Animalia
- Phylum: Chordata
- Class: Mammalia
- Order: Chiroptera
- Family: Pteropodidae
- Genus: Desmalopex
- Species: D. microleucoptera

Binomial name
- Desmalopex microleucoptera Esselstyn et al., 2008
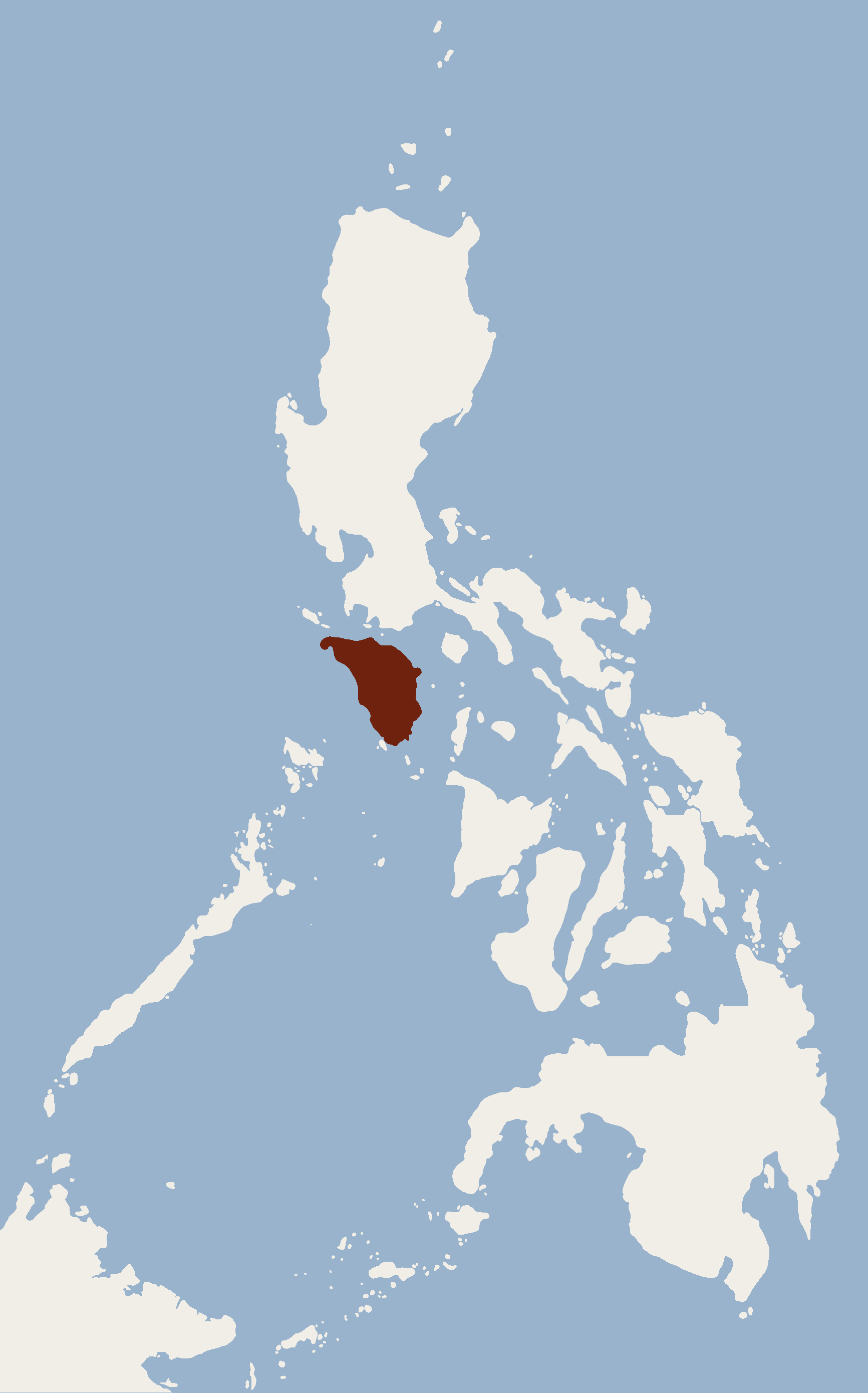

Species of bat

The small white-winged flying fox (Desmalopex microleucoptera) is a species of megabat in the family Pteropodidae. It is known from Mindoro Island, in the Philippines. Only 13 specimens have ever been found; one in 1998 and the others in 2006.
