= Kung Fu Mahjong =

2005 Hong Kong film by Wong Jing

- Promotional movie poster for Kung Fu Mahjong
- Directed by: Billy Chung; Wong Jing
- Written by: Wong Jing
- Produced by: Wong Jing
- Starring: Yuen Wah; Yuen Qiu; Roger Kwok; Theresa Fu; Wong Jing; Wong Yat Tung; Jade Leung; Tin Kai-Man; Lam Chi Chung
- Cinematography: Edmond Fung
- Edited by: Matthew Hui
- Music by: Marco Wan
- Distributed by: China Star Entertainment Group
- Release date: 2 June 2005
- Running time: 137 minutes
- Country: Hong Kong
- Language: Cantonese

Kung Fu Mahjong (Chinese: 雀聖) is a 2005 Hong Kong comedy film directed by Wong Jing and Billy Chung. It is about an obsessive gambler Chi Mo Sai (Yuen Wah) and Auntie Fei (Yuen Qiu). The film was followed by two sequels, Kung Fu Mahjong 2, which was released the same year as the first film, and Kung Fu Mahjong 3: The Final Duel, which was released in 2007.

== Plot ==
Chi Mo Sai meets Ah Wong in Auntie Fei's cafe and learns that Wong has a photographic memory. He decides to exploit this by teaching him how to play Mahjong, but Fei, Wong's boss, strongly objects. Despite Fei's objections, Wong learns mahjong from compulsive gambler Chi Mo Sai. He impresses triad boss Tin Kau Ko, but falls in love with Tin's mistress Cheryl and is beaten up by his men. Wong goes crazy. Luckily, Fei cures him using Mahjong. Fei wants Wong to beat Tin in the climatic "King of Mahjong" competition.

== Cast ==
- Yuen Wah as Chi Mo Sai
- Yuen Qiu as Auntie Fei, previously the Queen of Mahjong. Retired because someone stabbed her fiancé.
- Roger Kwok as Ah Wong
- Theresa Fu as Cheryl
- Wong Jing as Tin Kau Ko

== Reception ==
The film opened on 2 June 2005 in Hong Kong at the top of the box office, grossing US$337,363 (HK $2,625,258) in its first week.
