= Shih Kien =

Hong Kong actor (1913–2009)

- Born: Shek Wing-cheung; 1 January 1913; Panyu, Guangdong, Republic of China
- Died: 3 June 2009 (aged 96); Hong Kong
- Occupations: Actor; martial artist
- Years active: 1949–1995
- Spouse: Lee Kit-ying
- Awards: Hong Kong Film Awards – Professional Spirit Award; 2003 Lifetime Achievement Golden Bauhinia Awards – Life Achievement Award; 1996 Lifetime Achievement

Chinese name
- Traditional Chinese: 石堅
- Simplified Chinese: 石坚
- Jyutping: Sek^{6} Gin^{1}
Transcriptions
Standard Mandarin
- Hanyu Pinyin: Shí Jiān
- Wade–Giles: Shih^{2} Chien^{1}
Yue: Cantonese
- Jyutping: Sek^{6} Gin^{1}

Alternative Chinese name
- Traditional Chinese: 石榮璋
- Simplified Chinese: 石荣璋
- Jyutping: Sek^{6} Wing^{4} Zoeng^{1}
Transcriptions
Standard Mandarin
- Hanyu Pinyin: Shí Róngzhāng
- Wade–Giles: Shih^{2} Jung^{2} Chang^{1}
Yue: Cantonese
- Jyutping: Sek^{6} Wing^{4} Zoeng^{1}

Shek Wing-cheung (1 January 1913 – 3 June 2009), known by his stage name Shih Kien (Chinese: 石堅; Jyutping: Sek6 Gin1; pinyin: Shí Jiān), was a Hong Kong actor and martial artist. He was known for being one of the first stars of Chinese-language wuxia and martial arts film beginning in the 1940s, typically playing villains. He is most familiar to international audiences for his portrayal of the primary villain, Han, in the 1973 martial arts film Enter the Dragon that starred Bruce Lee.

== Early years ==
Shih was raised by his stepmother and was a sickly child. He decided to practise martial arts to improve his health and trained for nine years. Shih trained at Shanghai's Chin Woo Athletic Association and was among the first generation of students at the school to be certified as instructors. After becoming certified to teach styles, including Eagle Claw and Choy Li Fut, he decided to start his career as an actor. However, the outbreak of the Second Sino-Japanese War caused his studies to be disrupted. Shih and his friends travelled between Guangzhou and Hong Kong to stage drama performances, in order to raise funds as part of the anti-Japanese movement. Besides acting on stage, Shih also participated in back-stage activities, such as makeup and arrangements of lighting and props.

== Acting career ==
In 1940, Shih officially entered the entertainment industry as an apprentice of the Cantonese opera makeup artist Sit Kok-Sin, before becoming an actor. Shih starred as a Japanese secret agent in his debut film Flower in the Sea of Blood that year.

Nine years later, Shih was invited by film director Wu Pang to work with him on a series of Wong Fei-hung-related films. Shih gained fame for his portrayal of the villains in those films, and continued to play the role of the antagonist in several films during the first 20 years of his career. Shih's iconic "villain laughter" in the films was later mimicked and parodied by several actors.

In 1973, Shih was chosen to portray the villain in Bruce Lee's martial arts movie Enter the Dragon, in which he played Han, a one-handed triad boss who is highly skilled in martial arts (his character's voice was provided by Keye Luke). His character had a final showdown with Lee's character in the climax of the film.

In 1975, Shih joined the Hong Kong television station TVB, and appeared in several wuxia-themed television series, playing villains most of the time. However, he had also played the roles of gentlemanly, kind and fatherly characters, such as: Cheung Mo-kei's godfather Tse Shun in The Heaven Sword and Dragon Saber (1978), Lung Koon-sam in The Good, the Bad and the Ugly (1979), So Tai-pang in The Brothers (1980), and a grandfather in The Feud of Two Brothers (1986). Shih also shone in dramatic roles in non-wuxia films as well, such as Hong Kong 1941. Later in his career, Shih took on a comedic role with Jackie Chan in The Young Master.

In 1980, Shih was invited to participate in filming a television commercial to promote Ricola's mint candy products with his popular image as a villain.

== Retirement ==
Shih retired from the entertainment industry in 1992, with the 1994 film HK Adam's Family (奸人世家) specially dedicated to him. He appeared in the 2003 documentary Chop Socky: Cinema Hong Kong at the age of 90.

Shih received the Life Achievement Award in 1996 at the Golden Bauhinia Awards. Seven years later in 2003, Shih received the Professional Achievement Award at the 22nd Hong Kong Film Awards with Cho Tat-wah, who portrayed the protagonist or hero in several of the films they starred together in. In 2006, Shih donated one of his properties to the entertainment industry in support of the development of the industry. Between January and February 2007, the Hong Kong Film Archive showed 13 of Shih's films that were preserved at the archive.

== Personal life ==
Shih married Lee Kit-ying in 1936 and they had four sons and two daughters. Lee died of heart failure in August 1998.

Shih was initially not religious, but he converted to Christianity as an adult.

=== Death ===
Shih died of kidney failure on 3 June 2009 at the age of 96. At the time of his death, Shih was believed to be one of the oldest living successful actors in Hong Kong.

== Popular culture ==
In Hong Kong, the term "Kan Yan Kin" (simplified Chinese: 奸人坚; traditional Chinese: 奸人堅; pinyin: jiānrén jiān; lit. 'Villain Kin') was a popular reference to Shih. This nickname was borrowed as the Chinese title for the 2007 TVB comedy drama Men Don't Cry.

== Filmography ==
=== Films ===
This is a partial list of films.

- Xuehai Hua (1940) – Japanese Spy
- Dijiu Tianchang (1940)
- Gui lai yan (1948)
- Na Zha mei shan shou qi guai (1949) – White Gorilla
- The True Story of Wong Fei Hung (1949, part 1, 2) – Gray Hair Fu
- Hong Hei Koon huit chin Lau ga chun (1949) – Lau Sum-yim
- Zhujiang lei (1950) – Cheung Kau
- Hao men qi fu (1950)
- Huo shao Shao Lin si (1950)
- Fang Shi Yu xue zhan Yin Yang Dong (1950) – Priest Pak Mui
- Dadao Wang Wu Xuezhan Xiao Bawang (1950)
- Lu A Cai (1950)
- Lei dian zhui feng jian (1951)
- Huang Fei Hong chuan da jie ju (1951)
- Dadao Wang Wu Yuxue Jinchou Ji (1951)
- Yi fan feng shun (1951) – Lo Kin-ping
- Hu dan ying hun (1952) – Chiu Fu
- Jia (1953) – Ko Hak-ming
- Feng liu tian zi (1953)
- Ye du Yuan Yang jiang (1953)
- She qing gui (1953)
- Huang Fei Hong yi gun fu san ba (1953) – Wong Kwong-Jun
- Chun (1953) – Ko Hak-ming
- Qiu (1954) – Ko Hak-ming
- Bin cheng yan (1954)
- Huang Fei Hong yu Lin Shi Rong (1954) – Lui Kung-Cheung
- Cheng da sao (1954)
- Ai xia ji (1955)
- Liang Kuan yu Lin Shi Rong (1955) – Ng Dai Pang
- Xu Huang Fei Hong zhuan (1955) – Iron-Pellet Lee
- Chang sheng da (1955) – Cheng Nam San
- Tian chang di jiu (1955)
- Huang Fei Hong hua di qiang pao (1955) – Suen Kwan-Lun
- Huang Fei Hong wen zhen si pai lou (1955) – Suen Kwan-Lun
- Hou chuang (1955) – Fitness instructor
- Huang Fei Hong chang ti jian ba (1955)
- Huang Fei Hong da nao Fo Shan (1955) – Wu-So Yung
- Huang Fei Hong huo shao Daoshatou (1956) – Drunk Cheong
- Huang Fei Hong du bei dou wu long (1956) – Duk-Kok Lung
- Fang Shi Yu yi jiu Hong Xi Guan (1956) – Lee Sam-yeh
- Huang Fei Hong san xi nu biao shi (1956) – Pak Wing Fu
- Huang Fei Hong yi jiu long mu miao (1956) – Bully Biu
- Huang Fei Hong nu tun shi er shi (1956) – Pang Jan
- Huang Fei Hong fu er hu (1956) – Yeung Fei-Fu
- Huang Fei Hong xing shi hui qi lin (1956) – Sek Wang
- Huang Fei Hong tie ji dou wu gong (1956) – Fung Lo-Ngau
- Huang Fei Hong long zhou duo jin (1956) – Dai Mung Bing
- Huang Fei Hong Shamian fu shen quan (1956) – Big Mole Mak
- Huang Fei Hong heng sao Xiao Beijiang (1956) – Cheung Boon
- Huang Fei-hong gong chuan jian ba (1956)
- Bu xia xiang wei zhui hun biao (1956)
- Huang Fei Hong yong jiu mai yu can (1956) – Bean Curd Hing
- Huang Fei Hong Guanshan da he shou (1956) – Flying Spider
- Bi xue en chou wan gu qing (1956)
- Bai hao ying xiong chuan (1956)
- Tie sha zhang san hui ying zhao wang (1956)
- Huang Fei-hong tian hou miao jin xiang (1956) – Rocky Koo
- Huang Fei Hong shui di san qin Su Shulian (1956) – Rat Tak
- Huang Fei-hong qi shi hui jin long (1956)
- Huang Fei Hong da nao hua deng (1956) – Kwok Hung Pau
- Na Zha nao dong hai (1957) – East sea Dragon King
- Huang Fei Hong Henan yu xie zhan (1957)
- Nanhai quan wang ye dao mei hua ma (1957)
- Huang Fei Hong shi wang zheng ba (1957)
- Shui hu zhuan: Zhi qu sheng chen gang (1957) – 'Winged Tiger' Lui Wong
- Huang Fei Hong die xie ma an shan (1957) – Lee Lung
- Huang Fei Hong da po fei dao dang (1957) – Yuen Yiu Nam
- Heng ba qi sheng sheng zi qi (1957)
- Yan zhi ma san dou Huang Feihong (1957)
- Huang Fei-hong ye tan hei long shan (1957) – Huen Muk
- Huang Fei-hong xie jian su po wu (1957) – Crooked-Nose Biu
- Jian qing (1958) – Old Master Lau
- Huang Fei Hong wu du dou shuang long (1958) – Bearded Hung
- Huang Fei Hong long zheng hu dou (1958)
- Huang Fei Hong da po jin zhong zhao (1958)
- Huang Fei Hong da nao Feng Huang Gang (1958) – Cheung Dai-Lung
- Dai chat ho see gei (1958)
- Huang Fei Hong lei tai dou wu hu (1958) – Mount Chuen Tiger
- Huang Fei Hong fu qi chu san hai (1958)
- Huang Fei Hong hu xue jiu Liang Kuan (1958) – Ma Yu Foo
- Story of the Vulture Conqueror (1958–1959) – Wong Yeuk-see
- Sword of Blood and Valour (1958–1959) – Wan Ming-san / Man Tsi-wah
- Da po tong wang zhen (1959) – Tang Che
- Qi xia wu yi ye tan chong xiao lou (1959) – Tang Che
- Story of the White-Haired Demon Girl (1959, 3 parts)
- Huang Fei Hong bei kun hei di yu (1959) – Ma Yu Fu
- Shi xiong di (1959) – General
- Huang Fei Hong hu peng fu hu (1959) – Yeung Fei Foo
- Lu (1959)
- Qi jian xia Tian Shan (1959)
- Huang Fei Hong yi guan Cai hong qiao (1959) – Kam Si Kei
- Huang Fei Hong lei tai zheng ba zhan (1960) – Yeung Fei Foo
- Shi xiong di nu hai chu mo (1960)
- Xing xing wang da zhan Huang Fei Hong (1960) – Wong Tak HIn
- A Li Ba Ba yu si shi da dao (1960)
- Zui hou wu fen zhong (1960)
- Mi mi san nu tan (1960) – Lung Si Yeh
- The Book and the Sword (1960)
- The Story of the Great Heroes (1960–1961, 4 parts)
- Huang Fei Hong yuan da po wu hu zhen (1961) – Flying Tiger Wong
- Bu bu jing hun (1961) – Chow Chi-Hong
- Tian shan long feng jian shang ji (1961)
- Yuan yang dao shang ji (1961)

Killing of the Villains 1961

- Yuan yang dao xia ji (1961)
- Tian shan long feng jian xia ji (1961)
- Mo quan zhui xiong (1961) – Kiu Yat Pu
- Kun lun qi jian dou wu long (1961)
- Kun Lun san nu xia (1961) – To Fu Kit
- Ru yan jing hun (1962) – Sze Fu
- Yu shi fei shi (1962) – Ma Yu Lung
- Shuang jian meng (1962)
- Shuang jian meng xia ji da jie ju (1962)
- Mo ying jing hun (1962)
- Huang mao guai ren (1962) – Cheung Yan Lai
- Xian he shen zhen xin zhuan shang ji (1962)
- Xi xue shen bian (1963)
- The Black Centipede (1963)
- Gu rou en chou (1963) – So Pak-Kin
- Yi tian tu long ji shang ji (1963) – Golden Lion Tse Siu
- Yi tian tu long ji xia ji (1963) – Golden Lion Tse Siu
- Guai xia yan zi fei (1963) – Chow Cho-Kei
- Nan long bei feng (1963) – Luk Fong-ho
- Lei dian tian xian jian (1963) – Ma Lui
- Hao men yuan (1963) – Hong Ngai-Chung
- Story of the Sword and the Sabre (1963, 1965, 4 parts) – Xie Xun
- Luoyang qi xia zhuan (1964) – Pui Tai-Pau
- Bai gu li hun zhen shang ji (1964) – Lai Chun-Wah
- Bai gu li hun zhen xia ji (1964) – Lai Chun-Wah
- The Flying Fox (1964) – Yumyang Gwaisao
- Hong jin long da zhan bian fu jing (1964)
- Liu she dao (1964) – Chung Tin-bao
- Xuehua shenjian (1964) – Shi Mau-Duen
- Qing xia qing chou (1964)
- Man tang ji qing (1964)
- The Flying Fox in the Snowy Mountains (1964) – Yim Kei
- Devil's Palm: Part 1 (1964)
- Liu zhi qin mo (1965) – Lo Sing Hung
- Gui gu shen nu (1965)
- Dao jian shuang lan (1965)
- Huang jiang san nu xia (1965)
- The All-powerful Flute: Part 1 (1965)
- Ru lai shen zhang nu sui Wan Jian Men (1965)
- Te wu yi ling yi (1965)
- Treasure Hunt (1965)
- Tit gim jyu han seung jaap (1965)
- Yat gim ching (1966) – Shek Dai-Hung
- Bi luo hong chen shang ji (1966)
- Wen jie men shang ji (1966)
- Wen jie men xia ji (1966)
- Sheng huo xiong feng shang ji (1966)
- Sheng huo xiong feng xia ji (1966) – Hung Jan Tin
- Jin ding you long (1966)
- Zhen jia jin hu die (1966) – Chong Tak Ming
- Jin ding you long gou hun ling (1966)
- Jie huo hong lian shang ji (1966)
- Yu nu jin gang (1967)
- Bi yan mo nu (1967)
- Yu mian nu sha xing (1967) – Wu Wan Lung
- Kong zhong nu sha shou (1967)
- Mao yan nu lang (1967)
- Yu nu fei long (1967) – Wong Chong
- Story of a Discharged Prisoner (1967) – One-eyed Dragon
- Hak ye mau ba hoi yeung wai (1967)
- Qi jian shi san xia (1967) – Iron Head Snake / Zen Master Fearless
- Hong fen jin gang (1967)
- Fei zei jin si mao (1967)
- Huang Fei Hong hu zhao hui qan ying (1967) – Mang Fu
- Sha shou fen hong zuan (1967)
- Tian jian jue dao Shang ji (1967) – Tso Kam-pak
- Wu di nu sha shou (1967)
- Hei sha xing (1967)
- Li hou zhu (1968)
- Huang Fei Hong wei zhen wu yang cheng (1968)
- Du yan xia (1968)
- Ru lai shen zhang zai xian shen wei (1968)
- Huang Fei Hong xing shi du ba mei hua zhuang (1968) – Cheung Hing-Fui
- Xue ying hong deng (1968)
- Lan ying (1968) – Lam Kei
- Fang Shi Yu san da mu ren xiang (1968)
- Tai ji men (1968) – Kuan
- Huang Fei Hong zui da ba jin gang (1968) – Iron Palm
- Duo ming dao (1968)
- Fei xia xiao bai long (1968)
- Shen bian xia (1968)
- Sha shou jian (1968) – Gor Kong Lung
- Huang Fei Hong rou bo hei ba wang (1968) – Pak Foo
- Xiao wu yi da po tong wang zhen (1968) – Chief Guard Fang Lui-ying
- Huang Fei Hong: Quan wang zheng ba (1968) – Tai Tin Pau
- Xia sheng (1968)
- Tie er hu (1968) – To Chan-ping
- Tian lang zhai (1968) – Scarface Wolf
- Duo ming ci xiong jian (1969)
- Huang Fei Hong qiao duo sha yu qing (1969)
- Fei zei bai ju hua (1969)
- Shen tou zi mei hua (1969) – Ho Pau
- Huang Fei Hong shen wei fu san sha (1969) – Ko San Fu
- Long dan (1969)
- Yin dao xue jian (1969)
- Du yan xia du chuang jian hu (1969)
- Sam chiu liu (1969)
- E Mei ba dao (1969)
- Jiang hu di yi jian (1969)
- Huang Fei Hong yu xie liu huang gu (1969) – Bat Leung
- Tong pi tie gu (1969) – Shek Tin-Geng
- Yu mian sha xing (1969)
- Du bei shen ni (1969)
- Huang shan ke (1969)
- Yu nu jian (1969)
- Xiao wu shi (1969)
- Huang Fei Hong hu de dou wu lang (1969) – Ma Tin Lung / Fei Tin Leung
- San sha shou (1970)
- Nu jian kuang dao (1970) – Chang Si Fang
- Shen tan yi hao (1970)
- Huang Fei Hong yong po lie huo zhen (1970)
- Cai Li Fo yong qin se mo (1970)
- Shi wang zhi wang (1971)
- Ri yue shen tong (1971)
- Fei xia shen dao (1971)
- The Comet Strikes (1971)
- Jin xuan feng (1972)
- Ji xiang du fang (1972) – Li-shan Ho
- Shi hou (1972)
- Wang ming tu (1972) – Master Xi – village leader
- Tian ya ke (1972)
- Enter the Dragon (1973) – Han
- Fan mai ren kou (1974)
- Er long zheng zhu (1974) – Tiger
- Lang bei wei jian (1974)
- Two Graves to Kung Fu (1974)
- Huang Fei Hong yi qu Ding Cai Pao (1974) – Master Shen Chiu Kung
- Hou quan kou si (1974) – Chow Li Ming – Charles Ming
- Yinyang jie (1974)
- Long jia jiang (1976) – Patriarch Lung
- Hua xin san shao sao Yin Jie (1976)
- Hua sheng san shao bo yin jie (1976)
- The Private Eyes (1976) – Gow-suk – Uncle 9
- Xia liu she hui (1976) – Boss Shih
- Yin xia en chou lu (1978) – Lo Tien-fung
- Xing gui (1979)
- Long xing mo qiao (1980) – Master
- The Young Master (1980) – Chief Sang Kung
- She mao he hun xing quan (1980)
- Bruce King of Kung Fu (1980)
- Ru lai shen zhang (1982) – Heavenly Foot
- Hua xin da shao (1983) – Mo Yan-sang
- Gan yan gwai (1984) – Jian Ren – Uncle Ghost
- Hong Kong 1941 (1984) – Chung Shin
- Dian feng kuang long (1984)
- Hong Kong Godfather (1985) – Szetu Han
- Aces Go Places 4 (1986) – Interpol Hockey Teach Coach
- Millionaire's Express (1986) – Master Sek
- E nan (1986) – Man in Picture
- The Magic Crystal (1986) – Sergeant Shi
- Mao shan xiao tang (1986) – Kent of Mount Mao
- Wo yao jin gui xu (1986)
- Duet ming ga yan (1987) – Fung's Father
- Nan bei ma da (1988) – Mr. Guan
- A Better Tomorrow 3 (1989) – Mun's father
- Hu dan nu er hong (1990) – Liu Lung
- Wu ye tian shi (1990) – Grandpa
- Huang Fei Hong xiao zhuan (1992) – Old Master
- Jian ren shi jia (1994) – Kan San
- Xiang Gang lun xian (1994) – Himself
- Sap hing dai (1995) – Uncle Three (final film role)

=== TV series ===
- The Legend of the Book and the Sword (1976) – Cheung Chiu-chung
- The Heaven Sword and Dragon Saber (1978) – Tse Seun
- Vanity Fair (1978) - Kong Qingtian
- Chor Lau-heung (1979) – Lung Sing-saam
- Demi-Gods and Semi-Devils (1982) – Xiao Yuanshan
- The Legend of the Condor Heroes (1983) – Kao Chin-yan
- The Return of the Condor Heroes (1983) – Kao Chin-yan
- The Other Side of the Horizon (1984) – Fu Chin-san
- The Smiling, Proud Wanderer (1984) – Wong Yuen-ba
- Sword Stained with Royal Blood (1985) – Muk Yan-ching
- The Flying Fox of Snowy Mountain (1985) – Seung Kim-ming
- Man from Guangdong (1991)
