= Derek Yee =

Hong Kong filmmaker and actor (born 1957)

- 爾冬陞
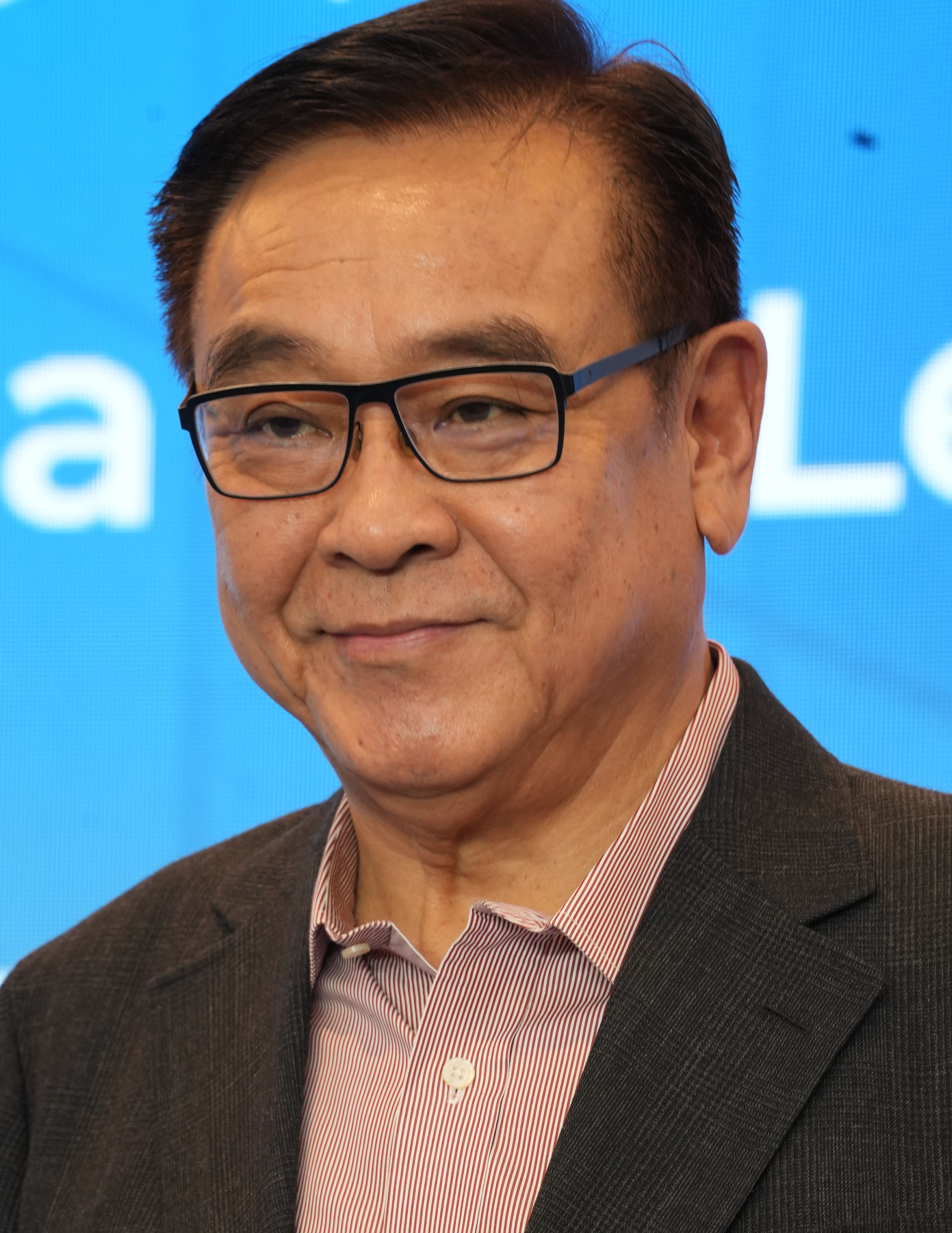
- Yee at 2026 Shanghai International Film Festival
- Born: Yee Tung-sing; 28 December 1957 (age 68); Kowloon, British Hong Kong
- Occupations: Film director; screenwriter; film producer; actor
- Years active: 1977–present
- Spouses: Juihsia Wang (m. 1995; div. 1996) Mandy Law (m. 2008; div. 2017)
- Children: 1
- Relatives: Paul Chun (half-brother); David Chiang (half-brother)
- Awards: Hong Kong Film Awards – Best Director; 1994 C'est la vie, mon chéri 2005 One Nite in Mongkok; Best Screenplay; 1994 C'est la vie, mon chéri 2005 One Nite in Mongkok Golden Bauhinia Awards – Best Director; 2005 One Nite in Mongkok Hong Kong Film Critics Society Awards – Best Director; 1995 Full Throttle; 2004 One Nite in Mongkok; Film of Merit; 1995 Full Throttle; 2003 Lost in Time; 2004 One Nite in Mongkok; 2007 Protégé; 2009 Shinjuku Incident

Chinese name
- Traditional Chinese: 爾冬陞
- Simplified Chinese: 尔冬升
- Cantonese Yale: ji dūng sīng
- Jyutping: ji3 dung1 sing1
Transcriptions
Standard Mandarin
- Hanyu Pinyin: Ěr Dōngshēng
Yue: Cantonese
- Yale Romanization: ji dūng sīng
- Jyutping: ji3 dung1 sing1

Signature
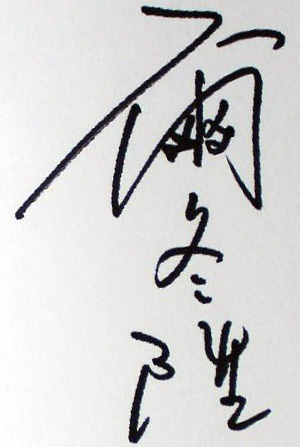

Derek Yee Tung-sing (traditional Chinese: 爾冬陞; simplified Chinese: 尔冬升; Jyutping: ji5 dung1 sing1) is a Hong Kong filmmaker and former actor.

== Early life ==
Yee was born Yee Tung-sing in Hong Kong on 28 December 1957, the son of Yee Kwong (爾光), a film producer from Tientsin (Tianjin), and Hung Wei (紅薇), an actress of half Manchu, half Mongol ethnicity. His elder half-brothers Paul Chun and David Chiang as well as his elder half-sister Yim Wai were also actors.

== Career ==
In 1977, Yee became an actor for Shaw Brothers Studio in Hong Kong and starred in over 40 movies produced by the studio.

Yee became a screenwriter and film director. He is known for the 2004 film One Nite in Mongkok, which won multiple awards. His other notable films include C'est la vie, mon chéri, Viva Erotica, The Truth About Jane and Sam and Protégé.

In 2017, Yee became the chairman of Hong Kong Film Awards Association.

== Filmography ==
=== As director and screenwriter ===
Year	Title	Awards
1986	The Lunatics	Nominated – Hong Kong Film Award for Best Director
1987	People's Hero	
1989	The Bachelor's Swan Song	Nominated – Hong Kong Film Award for Best Screenplay
1993	C'est la vie, mon chéri	Won – Hong Kong Film Award for Best Director; Won – Hong Kong Film Award for Best Screenplay; Nominated – Golden Horse Award for Best Director; Nominated – Golden Horse Award for Best Original Screenplay
1995	Full Throttle	Won – Hong Kong Film Critics Society Awards for Best Director; Nominated – Hong Kong Film Award for Best Director; Nominated – Hong Kong Film Award for Best Screenplay
1996	Viva Erotica	Nominated – Hong Kong Film Award for Best Director; Nominated – Golden Horse Award for Best Director; Nominated – Golden Bear (Berlin)
1999	The Truth About Jane and Sam	
2003	Lost in Time	Nominated – Hong Kong Film Award for Best Director
2004	One Night in Mongkok	Won – Hong Kong Film Award for Best Director; Won – Hong Kong Film Award for Best Screenplay; Won – Golden Bauhinia Award for Best Director; Won – Hong Kong Film Critics Society Awards for Best Director; Nominated – Golden Horse Award for Best Director; Nominated – Golden Bauhinia Award for Best Screenplay
2005	2 Young	Nominated – Hong Kong Film Award for Best Director; Nominated – Hong Kong Film Award for Best Screenplay
2005	Drink-Drank-Drunk	
2007	Protégé	Nominated – Hong Kong Film Award for Best Director; Nominated – Hong Kong Film Award for Best Screenplay; Nominated – Golden Horse Award for Best Director; Nominated – Golden Horse Award for Best Original Screenplay
2009	Shinjuku Incident	Nominated – Hong Kong Film Award for Best Director
2010	Triple Tap	
2011	The Great Magician	
2015	I Am Somebody	
2016	Sword Master	
2022	In Search of Lost Time	

=== As actor ===
Year	Title	Role	Awards
1977	Lady Exterminator		
1977	Jade Tiger		
1977	Death Duel		
1977	The Sentimental Swordsman		
1977	Pursuit of Vengeance		
1978	Interlude on Rails		
1978	Heaven Sword and Dragon Sabre	Zhang Wuji	
1978	Heaven Sword and Dragon Sabre II	Zhang Wuji	
1978	Legend of the Bat		
1979	Young Lovers		
1979	Full Moon Scimitar		
1980	Bat Without Wings		
1980	Heroes Shed No Tears		
1981	Return of the Sentimental Swordsman		
1981	The Battle for the Republic of China	Liu Fuji	
1981	Black Lizard		
1982	Hell Has No Boundary		
1982	Buddha's Palm		
1983	Shaolin Prince		
1983	Shaolin Intruders		
1983	Descendant of the Sun		
1983	The Supreme Swordsman		
1984	The Hidden Power of Dragon Sabre		
1984	My Darling Genie		
1984	Last Hero in China		
1985	How to Choose A Royal Bride		
1985	Let's Make Laugh II		
1990	Kawashima Yoshiko		Nominated – Hong Kong Film Award for Best Supporting Actor
1992	Empress Da Yu'er	Dorgon	
1994	The True Hero		
1994	Master of Zen	Bodhidharma	
2007	Protégé		

== See also ==
- Hong Kong Film Award for Best Director
