= Kung Fu Mahjong 2 =

2005 Hong Kong film by Wong Jing

- Film poster
- Directed by: Wong Jing
- Written by: Fung Keung
- Produced by: Ivy Kong
- Starring: Cherrie Ying; Yuen Wah; Yuen Qiu
- Cinematography: Joe Chan
- Edited by: Eric Cheung
- Music by: Lincoln Lo
- Distributed by: Mega-Vision Pictures
- Release date: 1 November 2005
- Running time: 94 minutes
- Country: Hong Kong
- Language: Cantonese

Kung Fu Mahjong 2 (simplified Chinese: 雀圣2自摸天后; traditional Chinese: 雀聖2自摸天后) is a 2005 Hong Kong film directed by Wong Jing and starring Cherrie Ying, Yuen Wah and Yuen Qiu. It is the first sequel to Kung Fu Mahjong.

== Synopsis ==
A master mahjong player named Fanny (Cherrie Ying) gets divorced by her husband and must play in the King of Mahjong match to win him back. As she plays, she must rely on her kung fu skills to beat up famous cheaters including a Japanese woman, a Muay Thai boxer and a set of triplets, in alliance with her classmates, master, and brother. She deploys her "Nipple Twister" technique to beat her ex-husband and win the match.

== Cast ==
- Cherrie Ying
- Yuen Wah
- Yuen Qiu
- Wong Jing
- Terence Yin
- Wong Tin-lam
- Sammy Leung
- Tiffany Lee
- Matt Chow

== Sequel ==
A sequel, Kung Fu Mahjong 3, was released in 2007.
