= New Tales of the Flying Fox =

1984 Hong Kong film by Lau Sze-yuk

- Film poster
- 新飛狐外傳
- Directed by: Lau Sze-yuk
- Screenplay by: Wong Jing
- Based on: The Young Flying Fox by Jin Yong
- Produced by: Mona Fong
- Starring: Felix Wong; Alex Man; Bryan Leung; Tai Liang-chun; Kara Hui; Ku Kuan-chung; Tong Chun-chung
- Cinematography: Wong Chit
- Edited by: Chiang Hsing-lung
- Music by: Stephen Shing; So Jan-hau
- Production company: Shaw Brothers Studio
- Distributed by: Shaw Brothers Studio
- Release date: 7 April 1984
- Running time: 89 minutes
- Country: Hong Kong
- Language: Mandarin
- Box office: HK$1,737,417

New Tales of the Flying Fox (新飛狐外傳) is a 1984 Hong Kong wuxia film adapted from the novel The Young Flying Fox by Jin Yong. The film was produced by the Shaw Brothers Studio and directed by Lau Sze-yuk.

== Synopsis ==
Two swordsmen, Hu Yidao and Miao Renfeng, are working together to start a rebellion. However, there are tensions between them so they agree to a duel to decide who is the better swordsman. Hu Yidao dies during the duel after sustaining a minor cut. Unknown to everyone, the blade has been smeared with poison by Tian Guinong, a villain hoping to turn Miao Renfeng and Hu Yidao against each other.

When Tian Guinong attempts to kill Hu Yidao's orphaned son Hu Fei, the servant Ping Asi saves the boy and escapes with him. Hu Fei grows up under Ping Asi's care and seeks to avenge his parents when he reaches adulthood.

== Cast ==
- Felix Wong as Hu Fei
- Alex Man as Miao Renfeng
- Bryan Leung as Hu Yidao
- Tai Liang-chun as Cheng Lingsu
- Kara Hui as Yuan Ziyi
- Ku Kuan-chung as Tian Guinong
- Tong Chun-chung as Fuk'anggan
- Chan Si-kai as Nan Lan
- Jue Tin-who as Shi Wanchen
- Lam Fai-wong as Ping Asi
- Yuen Qiu as Hu Yidao's wife
- Yeung Chi-hing as Lord Nalan
- Chiu Man-yan as Yu Lan
- Lee Hang as Sun Fuhu
- Kong Chuen as Liu Hejun
