= Opium and the Kung-Fu Master =

1984 Hong Kong film by Tang Chia

- Film poster
- Traditional Chinese: 洪拳大師
- Simplified Chinese: 洪拳大师
- Hanyu Pinyin: Hóng Quán Dà Shī
- Jyutping: Hung4 Kyun4 Daai6 Si1
- Directed by: Tang Chia
- Screenplay by: Wong Ying
- Produced by: Mona Fong
- Starring: Ti Lung
- Cinematography: Cho Wai-kei
- Edited by: Siu Fung; Ma Chung-yiu; Chiu Cheuk-man
- Music by: Stephen Shing; So Chun-hung
- Production company: Shaw Brothers Studio
- Distributed by: Shaw Brothers Studio
- Release date: 14 July 1984
- Running time: 86 minutes
- Country: Hong Kong
- Language: Cantonese

Opium and the Kung-Fu Master (Chinese: 洪拳大師; pinyin: Hóng Quán Dà Shī; Jyutping: Hung4 Kyun4 Daai6 Si1, lit. 'The Great Master of the Triad Fists') is a 1984 Hong Kong martial arts film directed by Tang Chia, who also serves as one of the film's action directors, and stars Ti Lung as the titular protagonist.

== Plot ==
Master Tit-kiu Sam (Ti Lung), the leader of the Ten Tigers of Canton, is the chief coach of China's militia. At that time, the opium ban was in use, but public sale of opium was widely available. Many bureaucrats were taking opium, a trend that Tit followed. As Tit takes opium, his physical skills were declining. Seeing how Tit's skills are declining, opium store owner Wing Fung (Chen Kuan-tai) challenges Tit to a public duel. Tit struggles to fight Wing and was in serious danger until his disciple Lo Kwa-sei (Robert Mak) steps in to rescue him before dying from his injuries. Seeing his disciple killed by Wing, Tit vows to seek revenge.

== Cast ==
- Ti Lung as Tit-kiu-sam
- Robert Mak as Lo Kwa-sei
- Leanne Liu as Siu-chui
- Chen Kuan-tai as Wing Fung
- Philip Ko as Golden Cat
- Koo Koon-chung as Mok Tim
- Alan Chan as Tai-kau
- Lee Hoi-sang as Instructor Cheng Wang
- Yue Tau-wan as Wong On
- Tang Chia as Master Yee-sing
- Chan Shen as Mr. Lo
- Kwan Fung as Fire Unicorn
- Ho Wai-han as Fat Girl
- Lui Hui as Sau's mother
- Chan Yuet-yue as Lan
- Cheung Kwok-wa as Cat's hired rascal
- Elvis Tsui as Cat's hired rascal
- Kong Chuen as Kwa-sei's worker
- Stephen Chan as Kwa-sei's worker
- Ailen Sit as Kwa-sei's worker
- Wong Wai-tong as Kwa-sei's worker
- Jacky Yeung as Kwa-sei's worker
- Ho Wing-cheung as Kwa-sei's worker
- Fei Kin as Kwa-sei's worker
- Lee Yiu-king as Kwa-sei's worker
- Wong Chi-ming as Cheng Wang's man
- Yuen Bun as Cheng Wang's man
- Ma Hon-yuen as Cheng Wang's man
- Wong Chi-keung as Cheng Wang's man
- Lee Hang as Cheng Wang's man
- Yuen Wah as Cheng Wang's man
- Ng Yuen-fan as Cheng Wang's man
- Wong Pau-kei as Cheng Wang's man
- Ling Chi-hung as Cheng Wang's man
- Lung Ying as Cheng Wang's man
- Ngai Tim-choi as Cheng Wang's man
- Kong Long as Mr. Lo's servant
- Ting Tung as Villager
- Cheung Sek-au as Villager
- Wong Ching-ho as Villager
- Wang Han-chen as Villager
- Cheung Chok-chow as Villager
- Yeung Chi-hing as Villager
- Ling Hon as Villager
- Fong Yue as Villager
- Cheng Miu as Villager
- Fung Ming as Villager
- Shum Lo as Villager
- Ho Pak-kwong as Villager
- Gam Tin-chue as Villager
- Sai Gwa-pau as Villager
- Wong Kung-miu as Villager
- Wong Wa as Boatman
- Chan Hung as Master Mo's servant
- Lam Wai
- Wong Chue-Kwong
- Chan Shiu-wa as Wing Fung's thug

== Critical reception ==
Adam Tyner of DVD Talk rated the film 4 stars out of 5 and writes "Opium and the Kung-Fu Master is outstanding, bolstered by an onslaught of startling action sequences and a remarkably effective undercurrent of addiction". Sylvia Rorem of Hong Kong Cinemagic gave the film a positive review and writes: "Opium and the Kung Fu Master is not simply a light piece of chop socky entertainment. While it is not a life-changing film, it is a solid, quality kung fu drama that can stand up to repeated viewings".
