= The Flying Fox in the Snowy Mountains =

1964 Hong Kong film by Lee Fa

- 雪山飛狐
- Directed by: Lee Fa
- Screenplay by: Lee Hang
- Based on: Fox Volant of the Snowy Mountain by Jin Yong
- Starring: Chiang Han; Pearl Au; Lee Yuet-ching; Shih Kien
- Production company: Emei Film Company
- Release dates: 25 March 1964 (Part 1); 1 April 1964 (Part 2)
- Country: Hong Kong
- Language: Mandarin

The Flying Fox in the Snowy Mountains (雪山飛狐) is a two-part 1964 Hong Kong wuxia film adapted from the novel Fox Volant of the Snowy Mountain by Jin Yong. The film was produced by Emei Film Company and directed by Lee Fa.

== Cast ==
- Chiang Han as Hu Fei / Hu Yidao
- Pearl Au as Yuan Ziyi
- Sheung-kwun Yuk as Cheng Lingsu
- Chan Wai-yu as Hu Yidao's wife
- Ng Yam-chi as Miao Renfeng
- Shih Kien as Yan Ji
- Yuen Siu-tien as Liu Hezhen
- Ko Lo-chuen as Chaofeng
