= Shaolin Intruders =

1983 Hong Kong film by Tang Chia

- Film poster
- Traditional Chinese: 三闖少林
- Hanyu Pinyin: San chuang Shao Lin
- Directed by: Tang Chia (唐佳)
- Screenplay by: Ni Kuang; Hung Hak (洪克); Ling Yun (凌雲); Yip Kam-Hung (葉錦鴻)
- Produced by: Mona Fong
- Starring: Yee Tung-Shing
- Cinematography: Cho Wai-kei (曹惠琪)
- Edited by: Siu Fung (少峯); Ma Chung-yiu (馬仲堯); Chiu Cheuk-man (趙卓文)
- Music by: Stephen Shing (成錦榮); So Jan-Hau (蘇振厚)
- Production company: Shaw Brothers Studio
- Distributed by: Shaw Brothers Studio
- Release date: 6 October 1983
- Running time: 89 minutes
- Country: Hong Kong
- Language: Cantonese
- Box office: HK $3,440,390

Shaolin Intruders (Chinese: 三闖少林; pinyin: San chuang Shao Lin, lit. 'Three Visits to Shaolin Temple'), also known as Battle for Shaolin, is a 1983 Hong Kong martial arts film directed by Tang Chia (唐佳), who also served as one of the film's action directors. The film stars Yee Tung-Shing.

== Plot ==
The Tiger, Wind, Cloud and Dragon clans are the Big Four families. Chief Chin Hu of the Golden Tiger clan and his armed escorts are attacked and killed by four masked monks.

Chief Fang Changfeng of the Tianfeng (Wind) clan enters the Good Luck Gambling House and bets gambling addict Qiao Yiduo that he cannot locate Lei Xun the wanderer in three days. Lei Xun escapes out a window, while his friend Ye Qinghua fights off Fang Chengfeng to give Lei Xun time to flee. Qiao Yiduo finds Lei Xun and gets him to return to the gambling house, where they find that Fang Chengfeng has been killed. The four masked monks use the Shaolin Jingang Palm technique while escaping.

Chief Lu of the Baiyun (Cloud) clan enters and says that Ye Qinghua must be the killer because the signature golden knife of her family is in Fang Changfeng's back. Chief Lu invites Chief Long Tianji of the Heilong (Dragon) clan to discuss the identity of the killer. 20 years earlier, the chiefs of the Big Four families killed the Six Demons of Guandong. Chief Long Tianji recommended also killing their children, but they did not do so. They suspect that Ye Qinghua, the daughter of a witch they killed, is the killer of the chiefs. Ye Qinghua retrieves her knife but is attacked by the chiefs and their men. Qiao Yidou throws snakes on them, enabling Ye Qinghua to escape.

Lei Xun goes to the Shaolin Temple and says that the monks must have been Shaolin because of their use of the Jingang Palm. Abbot Kongxing, Head of the Hall of Discipline, says that the Kongton clan's Bone Breaking Palm, the Changbai clan's Spirit Palm and the Shantong clan's Big Strike Palm can do similar damage. When Kongxing attacks Lei Xun for implying that his monks are the culprits, Lei Xun uses the Tai Chi Single Whip technique and explains that he is a third-generation member of the Tai Chi clan.

As Qiao Yiduo and Ye Qinghua are hiding in Chief Lu's treasure attic, the four monks kill Lu and his men and then steal treasure from the attic. The three friends return to the Shaolin Temple and Ye Qinghua demands to see all of the monks so that she can identify the culprits. The head abbot agrees to let them see all of the monks if they can beat three challenges in the Shaolin Temple. First, Qiao Yiduo passes through the Autumn and Spring Formation of Master Jianxing and four of his monks by tricking them into fleeing from a fake bomb. Next, Lei Xun must passes through the 12 Jingang formation by throwing sand in their eyes and slithering on the ground to the other side. Finally, the head abbot challenges Lei Xun and Qiao Yiduo at the same time. The two friends manage to make the head abbot touch the ground before they both do.

Abbot Kongxing brings out the missing monks from the Hall of Discipline, and Ye Qingua identifies four of them as the culprits. Her proof is that they could not yet have spent all of the treasure they recently stole, which Kongxing finds hidden in a table. Kongxing kills the four suspects and then kills himself for allowing the Shaolin Temple's reputation to be tarnished under his watch. The head abbot then pretends to kill himself, using a ball of paint for fake blood.

The surviving supporters of the Six Demons kidnap Chief Long and take him to Master Jianxing, who plans to become the head abbot. Jianxing explains that he was once Ye Chang, one of the Six Demons defeated 20 years earlier and husband of the witch who was Ye Qinghua's mother. Jianxing kills Chief Long and Ye Qinghua promises her father that she will kill Lei Xun and Qiao Yiduo. She ambushes the two, but dies when she shoots a golden knife from her bracer and Lei Xun knocks it back at her, hitting her in the stomach. She then kills Qiao Yiduo with her last remaining energy.

Lei Xun confronts Jianxing and blames him for turning Ye Qinghua vicious with his own hatred. The head abbot then surprises them by appearing alive. Jianxing injures the head abbot and runs inside the temple, telling the 12 Jingangs to kill Lei Xun. Lei Xun is injured by the opponents before the head abbot enters and tells them the truth. Jianxing lunges to kill Lei Xun, but the 12 Jingang kill him.

== Cast ==
- Yee Tung-Shing as Lei Xun
- Lau Yuk-Pok as Ye Qinghua
- Jason Pai Piao as Qiao Yiduo
- Phillip Ko as Jianxing
- Liu Yu-Po as Yeh Ching-hua
- Chan Shen as Shaolin Abbot
- Ku Feng as Chief Lu
- Teng Wei-Hao as Golden Tiger Escort
- Kwan Fung as Chief Long Tianji
- Ai Fei (艾飛) as Chief Fang Changfeng
- Lee Hoi-Sang as Abbot Kongxing
- Shum Lo as Tavern boss
- Alan Chan Kwok-Kuen as Shaolin 12 Jingang
- Yue Tau-Wan as Shaolin 12 Jingang
- Elvis Tsui Kam-Kong as Shaolin 12 Jingang
- Ho Pak-Kwong as Casino boss
- Fung Ging-Man as Casino clerk
- Lee Yiu-King as Bad monk
- Wong Wai-Tong as Bad monk
- Yang Te-yi (楊德毅) as Bad monk
- Patrick Ling Chi-Hung as Bad monk
- Wong Ching-Ho as 6 Demons in flashback
- Hung San-Nam as 6 Demons in flashback
- Yuen Wah as 6 Demons in flashback
- Cheung Kwok-Wah as Chief Lu's bodyguard
- Lee Fat-Yuen as Chief Lu's bodyguard
- Huang Pei-Chic as Golden Tiger Escort member
- Wong Chi-Ming as Golden Tiger Escort member
- Tam Wai-Man as Chief Fang's thug
- Ngai Tim-Choi as Chief Fang's thug
- Lam Chi-Tai as Chief Fang's thug
- Wan Seung-Lam as Chief Lu's thug / Chief Long's thug
- Lee Hang (李恆) as Monk
- Ma Hon-Yuen as Monk
- Lee Foo-Wai as Monk
- Stephen Chan Yung as Monk
- Fung Ming as Gambler / Inn guest
- Kong Chuen (江全) as Chief Long's thug
- Lung Ying (龍英) as Chief Long's thug
- Tang Yuk-Wing as Inn guest
- Ting Tung as Inn guest
- Wong Siu-Ming (王小明) as Casino clerk
- Lau Chun as Casino clerk
- Wong Chi-Wai as Chief Long's thug
- Wong Chi-Kin Monk
- Jeng Yee Monk
- Hon Nin-Sang Monk
- Chan Shiu-Wa Monk
- To Wai-Wo Monk
- Cheung Wing-Cheung (張榮祥) Monk

== Production ==
The film was produced under the title Battle for Shaolin.

== Reception ==
Reviewer Will of Silver Emulsion Film Reviews gave the film a rating a perfect score of 4 out of 4 stars, writing, "The wire-work featured in all the fights is superb, easily the best I've seen in any Shaw picture. The sustained level of action and excitement contained throughout Shaolin Intruders is simply unprecedented." The review concludes, "I cannot rave about this movie enough, except to give it the four stars it deserves as not only one of the greatest Shaw Bros. films, but also one of the greatest kung-fu pictures of all time. Enjoy!"

Reviewer Andrew Saroch of Far East Films gave the film a rating of 4 out of 5 stars, writing, "'Shaolin Intruders' is full of the intrigue and elevated quality that had been expected of films released under the banner. Choreographer par excellence Tang Chia manages to create a superior blend of the aforementioned assets along with excellent characterisation and enjoyable comedy. The casting doesn't leap off the page, but Chia crafts a kung-fu adventure that is as much about personalities as it is about action." The review concludes, "'Shaolin Intruders' doesn't offer any of the genre-defining moments that leap out of the true masterpieces of the genre. [...] However, this is without doubt another strong recommendation for all Shaw Brothers fans and the like. A classy production."

Reviewer Loron Hays of Reel Reviews gave the film a rating of 5 out of 5 fists, writing, "With a straight-forward story and some absolutely heart-pounding action scenes - one including the shuffling and reshuffling of benches with the challenge of being the first fighter to touch the ground - Shaolin Intruders is top tier entertainment through and through. There's no moment in this martial arts masterpiece which lags or feels out of step. Every moment highlights just how badass these movies can be . . . and Tang Chia proves, once again, he's the right man for the job.

Reviewer Oli of Dark Side Reviews gave the film a rating of 8.5 out of 10, calling it "a little gem of martial inventiveness, with fight scenes bordering on mild madness, sometimes even downright abracadabra!"

Reviewer Chris Hatcher of City on Fire gave the film a rating of 10/10, writing, "the film is magnificent in every sense of the word! From gravity-defying action to intriguing story to great acting, it elevates the typical kung fu tropes to greater heights on every level."
