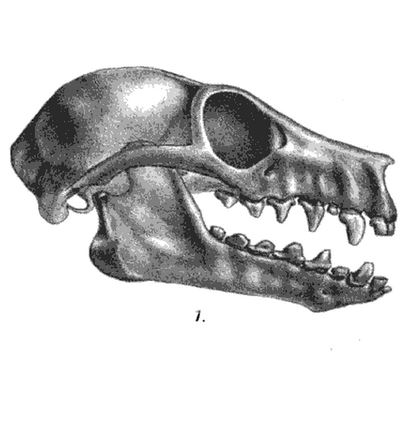

Conservation status
- Vulnerable (IUCN 3.1)

Scientific classification
- Kingdom: Animalia
- Phylum: Chordata
- Class: Mammalia
- Order: Chiroptera
- Family: Pteropodidae
- Genus: Desmalopex
- Species: D. leucoptera

Binomial name
- Desmalopex leucoptera Temminck, 1853
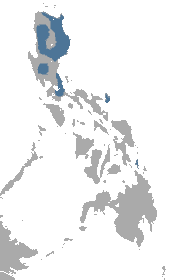
- White-winged flying fox range

Synonyms
- Pteropus leucopterus

= White-winged flying fox =

Species of bat

The white-winged flying fox (Desmalopex leucoptera), also known as the mottle-winged flying fox, is a species of bat in the family Pteropodidae. They are endemic to the Philippines. Their natural habitats are subtropical and tropical dry forests. In 2008, Giannini et al. revived the genus Desmalopex and placed D. leucoptera in it.
