= The Sword of Many Loves =

1993 Hong Kong film by Poon Man-kit

- VCD cover art
- 飛狐外傳
- Directed by: Poon Man-kit
- Screenplay by: Lee Ying-kit; Johnny Mak; Stephen Shiu
- Based on: The Young Flying Fox by Jin Yong
- Produced by: Johnny Mak; Stephen Shiu
- Starring: Leon Lai; Michelle Reis; Sharla Cheung; Elvis Tsui
- Cinematography: Chiu Foo-keung; Wong Bo-man
- Edited by: Fan Kung-ming
- Music by: William Hu
- Production company: Golden Harvest
- Distributed by: Gala Film Distribution
- Release date: 20 August 1993
- Running time: 106 minutes
- Country: Hong Kong
- Language: Cantonese
- Box office: HK$6,859,835

The Sword of Many Loves (飛狐外傳), also known as The Sword of Many Lovers, is a 1993 Hong Kong wuxia film adapted from the novel The Young Flying Fox by Jin Yong. The film was produced by Golden Harvest and directed by Poon Man-kit.

== Synopsis ==
Hu Fei, who has been orphaned at a young age, was raised by a family servant Ping Asi, and has trained himself in martial arts. They disguise themselves as brick traders and head to Cheng Lingsu's home to deliver bricks for building a tomb for Cheng's recently deceased master. Cheng Lingsu's seniors, seeking a medical journal left behind by their master, show up and cause trouble for her, but Hu Fei helps her drive them away.

Hu Fei and Ping Asi later head to Nanjing, where they learn that the Zhong family, who is friendly to them, have run into trouble with Feng Nantian, a local crime lord. Ping Asi is killed in the confrontation, leading Hu Fei to seek vengeance on Feng Nantian. Later, Hu Fei meets Yuan Ziyi, who wishes to participate in a martial arts contest and unite the wulin under a common cause of overthrowing the Qing dynasty and restoring the Ming dynasty.

Hu Fei and Yuan Ziyi then travel together and fall in love along the way. Just as Hu Fei finally has the chance to kill Feng Nantian, he is stopped by Yuan Ziyi, who reveals that Feng Nantian is her father and that she wants to kill him herself in order to avenge her mother, who had died because of Feng Nantian. Yuan Ziyi gets poisoned in the process, but Hu Fei saves her and takes her to Cheng Lingsu to be healed.

Cheng Lingsu, who is also in love with Hu Fei, agrees to cure Yuan Ziyi only if Hu promises to end his romantic relationship with Yuan. Yuan is eventually cured, and the three of them attend the martial arts contest together, leading to a final showdown between Hu Fei and Feng Nantian.

== Cast ==
- Leon Lai as Hu Fei
- Michelle Reis as Cheng Lingsu
- Sharla Cheung as Yuan Ziyi
- Elvis Tsui as Feng Nantian
