= Shaolin Prince =

1982 Hong Kong film by Tang Chia

- Film poster

Chinese name
- Traditional Chinese: 少林傳人
Transcriptions
- Directed by: Tang Chia
- Screenplay by: Wong Jing
- Produced by: Mona Fong
- Starring: Ti Lung; Derek Yee; Jason Pai Piao; Ku Feng; Chan Shen; Yuen Wah
- Cinematography: Cho Wai-Kei; Wong Chit
- Edited by: Chao Cho-Wen; Shao Feng Yu; Ma Chung-Yiu
- Music by: Stephen Shing; So Jan-Hau
- Production company: Shaw Brothers Studio
- Distributed by: Shaw Brothers Studio
- Release date: 1982
- Running time: 93 minutes
- Country: Hong Kong
- Language: Cantonese

Shaolin Prince (Chinese: 少林傳人) a.k.a. Death Mask of the Ninja, Shaolin Death Mask, and Iron Fingers of Death, is a 1982 Hong Kong martial arts-action film released by Shaw Brothers and directed by Tang Chia. It is one of the Shaolin Temple-themed martial arts films and featured Ti Lung, Derek Yee and Jason Pai Piao.

== Plot ==
The 9th Prince aka "Iron Fingers" conspires to become emperor. To do so, he must kill the current emperor and his two newborn sons, elder brother Tao Hing and his younger brother, Wong Szu Tai, who are protected by their bodyguards, Gu Long and Li Chin. After the emperor is killed, Gu Long and Li Chin escape with the boys, but end up separated after a run-in with the 9th Prince and his two assassins, "Fire Man" and "Water Man". Tao Hing is taken to Shaolin Temple and placed under the care of the "3 Holy Fools" while Wong Szu Tai is placed under the care of Prime Minister Wang (Ku Feng). Growing up, they become unaware of each other's whereabouts or existence. Tao Hing is raised by the 3 Holy Fools, who are forbidden to come out of their dwelling due to corruption in Shaolin Temple. He learns the secret Yijin Jing kung fu style, however, he is naive and knows nothing of his lineage though he carries the emperors royal seal. He constantly gets into fights with a traitorous monk, Dao Kong, who secretly works for the 9th Prince but bests him in every scuffle. Wong Szu Tai however, being raised by the Prime Minister and Gu Long is well aware of the existence of his brother (though he does not know who or where he is), and the treachery of the 9th Prince. Gu Long tells him the only way to beat the 9th Prince is to go to Shaolin and get the Yijin Jing manual. The 9th Prince hears of the existence of Wong Szu Tai and visits the Prime Minister. He attempts to test if Wong knows kung fu but Wong holds back as he realizes he cannot beat the 9th Prince.

After an arranged exorcism by monk Dao Kong goes haywire and leaves Tao Hing to fend for himself, a passing Wong Szu Tai rescues and befriends him. Tao Hing offers to escort Wong Zu Tai to Shaolin, which angers monk Dao Kong as they arrive. Wong Szu Tai fights his way into Shaolin to get the Yijin Jing manual, but he is thwarted by the monks who make him fight through their tests in order to read it. Dao Kong goes to apprehend Tao Hing, but he is defeated as usual. Tao Hing rescues Wong Szu Tai, discovers the corrupt monks, and helps Wong Szu Tai to pass the "18 Buddhas". They are no match for the Buddhas until the 3 Holy Fools intervene, whose house arrest is about to expire. They also allow Tao Hing and Wong Zu Tai to take the Yijin Jing manual. The 9th Prince and Dao Kong go to intercept Tao Hing and Wong Zu Tai at an inn, but Dao Kong is ambushed and killed by Tao Hing. Tao Hing goes with Wong Szu Tai to kill the 9th Princes' puppet emperor, but after eavesdropping on him, Tao Hing realizes the "emperor" is a good man that is just being manipulated by the 9th Prince. This causes a rift between him and Wong Szu Tai after Wong attacks the puppet emperor and Tao Hing is forced to protect him, using the Yijin style on Wong. An angered Wong departs until he's intercepted by Fire Man and Water Man, however Tao Hing arrives, helps him defeat them, and they make amends. They return to the Prime Minister's house but everyone is dead except the Prime Minister and Gu Long. Tao Hing kneels to help Gu Long and accidentally drops the royal seal, which sparks the curiosity of Gu Long thus prompting him to say "we found him!" before he dies. Tao Hing and Wong Szu Tai realize they are brothers and go back to Shaolin to defeat an awaiting 9th Prince. After the 9th Prince is defeated, Wong Szu Tai returns to reclaim his lineage and Tao Hing becomes a senior monk at Shaolin alongside the 3 Holy Fools.

== Cast ==
- Ti Lung – Tao Hing/Dao Xing
- Derek Yee – Wong Szu Tai/Wang Zi Tai
- Jason Pai Piao – 9th Prince/Lord 9th/Iron fingers
- Yuen Wah - Li Chin/Li Zheng
- Chan Shen aka Alan Chan - Abbot of Shaolin temple
- Yue Tau Wan - holy fool monk Wu Li
- Yuen Bun – Water General
- Lam Fai Wong – holy fool monk Wu Ming
- Elvis Tsui aka Elvis Tsui Kam Kong - Monk Wu Ren
- Ku Feng - Prime Minister Wang
- Alan Chan Kwok-Kuen - holy fool monk Wu Zhi
- Lee Hoi-sang - Monk Dao Kong
- Tong Gai - Chief of Lohan with two swords
- Chiang Tao - Fire General
- Ngaai Fei - Emperor
- Kwan Fung - Gu Long/Master Gu
- Ku Kuan-Chung - Puppet Emperor
- Chan Leung - Soldier in first attack
- Wong Pau-Gei - General who attacks the palace
- Cheung Kwok-Wah - 9th Lord's Personal Guard
- Lau Yuk-Pok - Xia Suqin
- Shum Lo - Master Xia
- Cheung Chok-Chow - Master Xia's servant
- Wong Chi-Ming - Soldier / Palace Guard / Monk
- To Wai-Wo - Palace Guard
- Lee Fat-Yuen - Palace Guard
- Wong Chi-Wai - Guard Tu / Soldier
- Yeung Chi-Hing - Innkeeper
- Ma Hon-Yuen - Shaolin Lohan Monk / Shaolin Guardian
- Lee Hang - Palace Guard / Monk
- Lung Ying - Shaolin Guardian / Soldier
- Wong Wai-Tong - Shaolin Guardian / Monk present during the exorcism
- Choi Kwok-Keung - Shaolin Guardian
- Kong Chuen - Soldier / Palace Guard / Shaolin Guardia
- Wong Chi-Keung - Soldier in 9th Lord's Army
- Chui Fat - Soldier in 9th Lord's Army
- Tam Bo - Soldier in 9th Lord's Army
- Tam Wai-Man - Soldier in 9th Lord's Army
- Tang Yuk-Wing - Soldier in 9th Lord's Army
- San Kuai - Soldier in 9th Lord's Army
- Chan Siu-Gai - Shaolin Lohan Monk / Monk
- Ng Yuen-Fan - Monk
- Stephen Chan Yung - Snr Monk
- Fei Gin - Soldier / Monk
- Ling Chi-Hung - Palace Guard / Lohan Monk
- Ho Chi-Wai - Soldier / Monk
- Lam Foo-Wai - Soldier / Monk
- Chu Kong - Shaolin Lohan monk
- Chan Ming-Wai - Shaolin Lohan monk
- Jacky Yeung Tak-Ngai - Shaolin Lohan monk
- Kong Long - Monk
- Lam Tit-Ching - Prime Minister's servant
- Lau Cheun - Prime Minister's servant
- Au Chi-Hung - Monk
- Wan Yiu-Cho - Soldier
- Jeng Yee - Shaolin monk
- Chan Shiu-Wa - Shaolin monk
