= Forest Chan =

- Born: October 4, 1947; British Hong Kong
- Died: March 15, 2024 (aged 76); Sha Tin, Hong Kong
- Education: Primary school
- Occupation: Actor

Forest Chan Dick-Hark (Chinese: 陳狄克; 4 October 1947 – 15 March 2024) was a Hong Kong veteran television artiste, he has worked for Shaw Brothers Studio, Rediffusion Television and TVB as a martial artist, and is also a former TVB artiste with a basic artist contract. In 1976, Chan filmed a TV series called "The Chinese Killer King" for Rediffusion Television, in which he played the leading male role, "The Chinese Killer King" Charlie Zhao. He was deeply rooted in the hearts of the people and was nicknamed "The Chinese Killer King" ever since.

== Death ==
On March 15, 2024, Chan was rushed to the hospital after feeling unwell at home and later died of pneumonia at the age of 76.
