= The Young Flying Fox =

1960 wuxia novel by Jin Yong

- One part of The Young Flying Fox from the magazine Wuxia and History
- Author: Jin Yong
- Original title: 飛狐外傳
- Language: Chinese
- Genre: Wuxia
- Publisher: Wuxia and History
- Publication date: 1960
- Publication place: Hong Kong
- Media type: Print
- ISBN: 9786263617797
- Preceded by: The Book and the Sword
- Followed by: The Fox Volant of the Snowy Mountain

The Young Flying Fox
- Traditional Chinese: 飛狐外傳
- Simplified Chinese: 飞狐外传
- Literal meaning: Flying Fox Tales
Transcriptions
Standard Mandarin
- Hanyu Pinyin: Fēi Hú Wài Zhuàn
Yue: Cantonese
- Jyutping: Fei^{1} Wu^{4} Ngoi^{6} Zyun^{6}

The Young Flying Fox (飛狐外傳) is a wuxia novel by Jin Yong (Louis Cha). The novel was first serialised in Hong Kong in 1960 in the magazine Wuxia and History (武俠與歷史). The novel is a prequel to Fox Volant of the Snowy Mountain and was written a year after its literary predecessor.

== Plot summary ==
The story is set in 18th-century China during the Qing dynasty. Hu Fei is a young swordsman raised by Ping Asi after his parents' deaths. While roaming around, he encounters a ruthless villain, Feng Tiannan, and seeks to kill him to avenge the victims. He also meets Yuan Ziyi, a young lady who shows signs of affection towards him but shows up to stop him every time he comes close to killing Feng.

Based on what Ping told him, Hu believes that the legendary swordsman Miao Renfeng is responsible for his parents' deaths. When he finally finds Miao, he sees that Miao has been temporarily blinded by a deadly poison. Refusing to take advantage of Miao's plight to avenge his parents, Hu agrees to help Miao find a cure for his eyes. At the same time, he is so impressed by Miao's honourable character that he wonders if Ping is mistaken about Miao. While searching for the cure, he meets Cheng Lingsu, an apprentice of a deceased medicine guru, and witnesses her defeating her three evil seniors with her calm and wit.

Cheng accompanies Hu to heal Miao, who regains his sight and admits that he unintentionally killed Hu's father years ago. Filled with sorrow upon learning the truth, Hu leaves with Cheng, who becomes his sworn sister. While travelling together, they chance upon an election for a new chief of the wulin hosted by the general Fuk'anggan. The event is actually a plan by Fuk'anggan to instigate turmoil and ensure that the wulin will not pose a threat to the Qing government. Hu and Cheng disguise themselves to attend the election and, with Yuan's help, they expose and foil Fuk'anggan's plot.

They come under attack by Fuk'anggan's men and Hu is poisoned while shielding Cheng with his body. Cheng sacrifices her life to save Hu and reveals to him before dying that she loves him, filling him with anguish and regret. At Cheng's funeral, Hu meets Yuan, who tells him that she has already taken an oath to be a Buddhist nun in her childhood, so she cannot be together with him although she also loves him. She puts her palms together and recites a silent prayer before leaving.

== Principal characters ==
- Hu Fei (胡斐) – the protagonist and Hu Yidao's son.
- Hu Yidao (胡一刀) – a legendary swordsman from Liaodong who befriended Miao Renfeng despite their ancestors' longstanding feud. He was accidentally killed by Miao after being inflicted with a minor cut as Miao's sword had been secretly smeared with poison by Tian Guinong.
- Miao Renfeng (苗人鳳) – a formidable and honourable swordsman of equal fame as Hu Yidao.
- Cheng Lingsu (程靈素) – the apprentice of the "King of Venoms", a deceased medicine guru. She accompanies Hu Fei on his adventures and becomes his sworn sister despite having romantic feelings for him.
- Yuan Ziyi (袁紫衣) – Feng Tiannan's illegitimate daughter. Her mother gave birth to her after being raped by Feng, and had then been forced to commit suicide. She has vowed to avenge her mother by killing her beastly father, but can do so only after saving his life thrice. She loves Hu Fei but cannot be together with him, having taken an oath in her childhood to be a Buddhist nun.
- Fuk'anggan (福康安) – a Manchu general and illegitimate son of the Qianlong Emperor. He hosts the election for the chief of the wulin in an attempt to stir up conflict in the wulin.
- Tian Guinong (田歸農) – a descendant of the Tian family and an unscrupulous villain who pledges allegiance to Fuk'anggan.
- Feng Tiannan (鳳天南) – a ruthless and cruel villain who crosses paths with Hu Fei early in the story.

== Adaptations ==
=== Films ===
Year	Title	Production	Main cast
1980	Legend of the Fox	Shaw Brothers Studio (Hong Kong)	Chin Siu-ho, Philip Kwok, Chiang Sheng, Lu Feng, Wang Li, Choh Seung-wan, Wong Man-yee
1984	New Tales of the Flying Fox	Shaw Brothers Studio (Hong Kong)	Felix Wong, Bryan Leung, Alex Man, Tai Liang-chun, Kara Hui, Ku Kuan-chung, Tong Chun-chung
1993	The Sword of Many Loves	Golden Harvest (Hong Kong)	Leon Lai, Sharla Cheung, Michelle Reis, Elvis Tsui

=== Radio drama ===
In 2021, CNR (神州之声) was the first wuxia radio drama presentation aired in China about April 12th everyday 21:31 Beijing time.
