= List of television stations in Hong Kong =

There are four active free-to-air television networks and one remaining licensed pay television network in Hong Kong. There is also a number of online subscription television services.

Currently, there are no new applicants for free-to-air or pay-tv licences.

In 2007, free-to-air television broadcasters in Hong Kong were allocated extra frequency bands and bandwidth to provide additional digital broadcasts over and above that needed to provide simultaneous digital and analogue broadcasting of the four original multi frequency free-to-air channels. Digital terrestrial broadcasts began on 31 December 2007. Analogue terrestrial television ended in 2020.

== Free-to-air television ==
=== In operation ===
- Television Broadcasts Limited (TVB; 無綫電視)
- Radio Television Hong Kong (RTHK; 港台電視)
- HK Television Entertainment (HKTVE; 香港電視娛樂)
- i-CABLE HOY Limited (HOY; 有線寬頻開電視有限公司)

=== Former licensees ===
- Asia Television (ATV; 亞洲電視. Non-renewal announced in 2015. Ceased operation in 2016)
- Commercial Television (CTV; 佳藝電視. Ceased operation in 1978)

=== Former licence applicants ===
- New Asia Network (NAN; 新亞電視台), parent company Forever Top (Asia) Limited abandoned the application, following its acquisition of Cable TV Hong Kong and its subsidiary, Fantastic Television, which is a free television provider.
- Phoenix Hong Kong Television (PHKTV, 鳳凰香港電視), parent company Phoenix Television announced its decision to rescind the application on 18 August 2017.
- Hong Kong Television Network (HKTV; 香港電視網絡) – 2nd time applicant. First application was rejected in 2013. Mobile television licence that restricts in-home viewing granted in 2017. Gave up the application in 2018.

== Licensed pay television ==
=== In operation ===
- Now TV

=== Former licensees ===
- Cable TV Hong Kong
- TVB Network Vision

== Free-to-air television channels ==
=== Channels currently on-air ===
Channels telecasted by licensees
Ch №	Name in English	Name in Chinese	Description	Primary Language	Picture Format	Transmission	Launch Date	Licensee
31	RTHK TV 31	港台電視31	RTHK's main channel.	Cantonese	1080i HDTV	Terrestrial and hybrid fibre-coaxial	13 January 2014	RTHK
32	RTHK TV 32	港台電視32	A live feed of Legislative Council meetings every Wednesday and other important press conferences or events.	Cantonese	1080i HDTV	Terrestrial and hybrid fibre-coaxial	13 January 2014	RTHK
33	RTHK TV 33	港台電視33	Simulcast of the Hong Kong version of CCTV-1 HD	Putonghua	1080i HDTV	Terrestrial and hybrid fibre-coaxial	13 January 2014	RTHK
34	RTHK TV 34	港台電視34	Simulcast of content by CGTN Documentary	English	1080i HDTV	Terrestrial and hybrid fibre-coaxial	1 July 2022	RTHK
35	RTHK TV 35	港台電視35	Simulcast of content by CGTN	English	1080i HDTV	Terrestrial and hybrid fibre-coaxial	1 July 2023	RTHK
76	HOY 76	HOY 76	HOY TV's business news channel	English	1080i HDTV	Hybrid fibre-coaxial, cable and terrestrial	30 July 2018	I-CABLE HOY
77	HOY 77	HOY 77	HOY TV's general entertainment channel.	Cantonese	1080i HDTV	Hybrid fibre-coaxial, cable and terrestrial	14 May 2017	I-CABLE HOY
78	HOY 78	HOY 78	A 24-hour news, financial and infotainment channel.	Cantonese	1080i HDTV	Hybrid fibre-coaxial, cable and terrestrial	21 Nov 2022	I-CABLE HOY
81	TVB Jade	翡翠台	TVB's main general entertainment channel.	Cantonese	1080i HDTV	Terrestrial	19 November 1967	TVB
82	TVB Plus		A youth-oriented entertainment, financial news and sports channel.	Cantonese	1080i HDTV	Terrestrial	28 January 2008	TVB
83	TVB News Channel	無綫新聞台	A 24-hour news channel.	Cantonese	1080i HDTV	Terrestrial	15 August 2017	TVB
84	TVB Pearl	明珠台	A general entertainment channel broadcasting mainly in English.	English	1080i HDTV	Terrestrial	19 November 1967	TVB
85	Phoenix Hong Kong Channel	鳳凰衛視 香港台	To serve Chinese viewers in Hong Kong	Cantonese and Putonghua	1080i HDTV	Terrestrial	28 March 2011	TVB
96	ViuTVsix		A general entertainment channel broadcasting mainly in English.	English	1080i HDTV	IPTV and terrestrial	31 March 2017	HKTVE
99	ViuTV		HKTVE's general entertainment channel.	Cantonese	1080i HDTV	IPTV and terrestrial	2 April 2016 (Preview); 6 April 2016 (Actual Launch)	HKTVE

=== Defunct channels ===
Channel № (Digital)	Channel № (Analogue)	Name (English)	Name (Chinese)	Channel content	Primary language	Began operation (Digital)	Began operation (Analogue)	Ceased operation	Means of Transmission	Licence	Note
	29	Commercial Television	佳藝電視	A general entertainment channel with prime time educational programming. It was the territory's 3rd free-to-air terrestrial television station.	Cantonese		7 September 1975	22 August 1978	Terrestrial, free-to-air	Commercial Television	
		Rediffusion Television (1957–1963); Rediffusion Television English Channel (1963–1973)	麗的電視 (1957–1963) 麗的電視英文台 (1963–1973)	RTV's main channel. Later became Rediffusion's English channel.	Primary: English; Secondary: Cantonese		29 May 1957	1973	Subscription-based Cable	Rediffusion Television	Converted to a free-to-air television station.
		Rediffusion Television Chinese Channel	麗的電視中文台	RTV's main Chinese channel	Cantonese		30 September 1963	31 October 1973	Subscription-based Cable	Rediffusion Television	Became free-to-air channel RTV-1
11	23	RTV-1 (1973–1982); ATV Chinese (1982–1987); ATV Gold (1987–1989); ATV Home (1989–2016); ATV A1 (2017-2022)	麗的第一台 (1973–1982) 亞洲電視中文台 (1982–1988) 亞洲電視黃金台 (1987-1989) 亞洲電視本港台 (1989-2016) 亞洲電視A1台 (2017-2022)	RTV, and later ATV's main Chinese channel.	Cantonese	31 December 2007	1 December 1973	2 April 2016	Terrestrial, free-to-air	RTV (later ATV)	Station changed identity multiple times since 1973.
16	27	RTV-2 (1973–1982); ATV English (1982–1987); ATV Diamond (1987–1989); ATV World (1989–2016)	麗的第二台 (1973–1982) 亞洲電視英文台 (1982–1987) 亞洲電視鑽石台 (1987–1989) 亞洲電視國際台 (1989–2016)	RTV, and later ATV's main English channel.	English	31 December 2007	1 December 1973	2 April 2016	Terrestrial, free-to-air	RTV (later ATV)	Station changed identity multiple times since 1973.
12		ATV News & Business	亞洲電視新聞財經頻道	News channel.	Cantonese	31 December 2007		1 April 2009	Terrestrial, free-to-air	ATV	
13		ATV His	亞洲電視動感資訊頻道	Male-oriented channel.	Cantonese	31 December 2007		1 April 2009	Terrestrial, free-to-air	ATV	
14		ATV Her	亞洲電視魅力資訊頻道	Female-oriented channel.	Cantonese	31 December 2007		1 April 2009	Terrestrial, free-to-air	ATV	
15		ATV Plus	亞洲電視文化資訊頻道	Documentary channel.	Cantonese	31 December 2007		1 April 2009	Terrestrial, free-to-air	ATV	
15		CCTV-4	中國中央電視台中文國際頻道	Simulcast of content by CCTV-4.	Mandarin Chinese	1 April 2009		1 March 2011	Terrestrial, free-to-air	ATV	
14		CTi International	中天亞洲台	Simulcast of content by Chung T'ien Television.	Mandarin Chinese	1 April 2009		1 April 2011	Terrestrial, free-to-air	ATV	
19		ATV HDTV	亞洲電視高清頻道	High definition general entertainment channel.	Cantonese	31 December 2007		1 April 2009	Terrestrial, free-to-air	ATV	
19		ATV Asia	亞洲電視亞洲台	High definition general entertainment channel.	Cantonese	1 April 2009		2 May 2011	Terrestrial, free-to-air	ATV	
15		CCTV-1	中國中央電視台綜合頻道	Simulcast of content by China Central Television.	Mandarin Chinese	1 March 2011		2 April 2016	Terrestrial, free-to-air	ATV	
13		ATV Classic	歲月留聲	Replay of past ATV classics.	Cantonese	31 December 2012		2 April 2016	Terrestrial, free-to-air	ATV	
13		TVS-2	南方卫视	Simulcast of content by Southern Media Corporation.	Mandarin Chinese	1 October 2009		1 October 2012	Terrestrial, free-to-air	ATV	
85		TVB HD Jade	無線電視高清翡翠台	High definition general entertainment channel.	Cantonese	31 December 2007		22 February 2016, 2:59 am	Terrestrial, free-to-air	TVB	Cease simulcast transmission with TVB Jade & replace by J5.
85		TVB J5		A high definition channel focusing on financial news and documentaries.	Cantonese	22 February 2016		15 August 2017, 6:00 am	Terrestrial, free-to-air	TVB	Stopped showing variety shows and drama since 8 May 2017 and replace by TVB Finance Channel.

== Additional channels ==
=== Operative services ===
Hong Kong uses the same Digital Terrestrial Multimedia Broadcast (DMB-T/H) standard as Macau and Guangdong and, because of signal overspill, viewers in Hong Kong can receive and watch all free to air channels from these areas without much difficulty.

However, because of licensing and intellectual property reasons, except for the four local free-to-air networks and CCTV-1, a subsidiary of China Central Television (CCTV), viewers outside of certain confines are not legally allowed to watch these channels.

Residential subscribers to cable premium and subscription services are free to use these services within certain confines, usually within their own homes, and under the terms and conditions of their service provider. Other contracts deal with the provision of services to non-domestic properties, e.g. premium sport content to bars.
