= Television in Hong Kong =

Television in Hong Kong is primarily delivered in Cantonese and English through analogue and digital terrestrial, cable, IPTV, and the Internet. Satellite TV is not common, although many housing estates have dishes and re-distribute a limited number of free channels through coaxial cables. The dominant broadcasters are TVB, ViuTV and i-Cable HOY.

== History ==
Hong Kong's television history began with the launch of Rediffusion Television (RTV) on 29 May 1957 (later renamed as Asia Television (ATV)). RTV started off as a cable subscription service but became a free-to-air broadcaster in 1973, with both Cantonese and English channels. In April 2016, the Executive Council decided not to renew ATV's broadcast licence and subsequently its channels closed.

Television Broadcasts Limited (TVB) was the territory's first free-to-air commercial station (launching in 1967) and remains the predominant TV broadcaster today with multiple Cantonese channels and one English channel, on analogue and digital.

A short-lived network, known as Commercial Television, opened in 1975 and operated for about three years until its bankruptcy.

The government-owned Radio Television Hong Kong (RTHK) (a radio broadcaster from 1949) starting making TV programmes in 1976—to be aired on TVB and ATV and later on HKCTV and Now TV. In 2016, RTHK took over the analogue frequency of ATV and now also has its own digital channels.

HKTVE, commonly known as ViuTV started broadcasting in 2016, digital-only, with a Cantonese channel and an English channel.

In May 2017, Fantastic Television started digital free-to-air broadcasting, but after a year they moved their content to HKCTV.

There was also an Internet television and VOD channel called Hong Kong Technology Venture (HKTV, owned by the City Telecom, which was renamed as the same name in 2013) which was launched in 2014 and can be viewed on smart TVs, set-top boxes, personal computers, smartphones, and tablet computers, then closed in 2018. And ATV was revived as the OTT platform in 2017 and is still running today.

== Subscription networks ==
- Cable TV Hong Kong (Hong Kong Cable Television Ltd): controlled by Forever Top, operates over 100 channels with programmes broadcast in English, Cantonese, Putonghua and other languages.
- Now TV (PCCW-HKT Interactive Multimedia Services Ltd): provides 25 free channels and over 200 pay channels with programmes broadcast in English language (Supreme Sports Pack, World Entertainment Pack 1 & 2, Movies Pack 1 & 2, International News Pack, Kids Pack, Knowledge Pack), Cantonese, Putonghua, Japanese and Korean (Chinese Movies Pack & Asian Entertainment Pack), Pinoy (Filipino Pack), French (French Pack) and Indian (Indian Pack 1–3).
- TVB's MyTV Super

== Satellite TV ==
- Phoenix Television: also broadcast in Greater China

== Programming ==
Hong Kong's soap drama, comedy series and variety show productions reach large audiences throughout the Cantonese-speaking and Mandarin-speaking, world.

== Regulatory control ==
Television in Hong Kong is not subject to China's regulatory or 'content' control, but is under the purview of the Communications Authority in Hong Kong.

== Digital terrestrial television ==
Hong Kong was not required to follow China's DTT standard, but the Hong Kong government nevertheless opted to use DMB-T/H (now known as DTMB) as the digital terrestrial television broadcast standard in 2004 (hence rejecting the DVB-T standard originally proposed in 1998 and trialled in 2000). The official start of DTT broadcasting was at 7pm on 31 December 2007 as the first digital TV signal transmitter in Tsz Wan Shan went online.

In October 2007, both broadcasting companies agreed to use the MPEG2 video standard for broadcasting free-to-air channels (TVB Jade, ATV Home, TVB Pearl and ATV World); the H.264 video codec was implemented for all DTT-only channels.

For the audio codec, usual DTMB set-top boxes would support MPEG-1 Audio Layer II (MP2) for stereo audio tracks, and Dolby AC-3 for 5.1 surround sound audio tracks. The official specification defines standard-definition broadcasting as 576i at 50 fields per second and high-definition broadcasting in 720p at 50 Hz or 1080i at 50 Hz.

All major transmitters were completed by 2008, covering at least 75 percent of the Hong Kong population. The current coverage reaches 99% of the population. Full digital television broadcasts began on 1 December 2020, postponed from the originally planned date in 2015.

Starting 1 December 2021, six digital television channels (being TVB Jade, ViuTVsix, ViuTV, RTHK TV 31, RTHK TV 32 and RTHK TV 33) will transit from frequencies in the 600/700 MHz bands to the 500 MHz band to support and boost telecommunication services for applications like 5G networks as well as improving network coverage. A six-month transition stage from 1 April will simulcast TV channels on both existing and new frequencies to smoothen the transition.

== See also ==
- List of television stations in Hong Kong
- Hong Kong television drama
