= List of television programmes broadcast by ViuTVsix =

This is a list of television programmes broadcast by Hong Kong English language television channel ViuTVsix.

== Current programming ==
=== Drama ===
==== HBO Originals ====
- Boardwalk Empire (2017)
- Entourage (2017)
- Strike Back (2017)
- True Detective (2017)
- The Sopranos (2017-present)
- The Newsroom (2018-present)
- Treme (2018-present)

==== Other ====
- Criminal Minds (2017)
- Lewis (2017)
- Miranda (2017)
- My Generation (2017)
- Rectify (2017)
- Switched at Birth (2017–2018)
- The Syndicate (2017)
- Tripped (2017)
- The Widower (2017)
- Happy Endings (2017-present)
- Grey's Anatomy (2017-present)
- Blindspot (2018-present)
- The Closer (2018-present)
- Prime Suspect (2018)
- Fearless (2018)

=== Documentary, lifestyle and factual television ===
- Angry Planet (2017–present)
- Before I Kick the Bucket (2017)
- Bondi Vet (2017–present)
- Break'n Reality (2017)
- Bringing Sexy Back (2017)
- Britain's Best Bakery (2017)
- Changing Faces (2017)
- Cook the Books (2017)
- Crimes that Shook Australia (2017–present)
- Dementia Can Be Cured (2017)
- DOGTV (2017–present)
- The Eccentrics (2017–present)
- Food Factory (2017–present)
- How to Live to a Hundred (2017)
- I, Pedophile (2017)
- Is Sugar the New Fat? (2017)
- Letters to Our Children (2017)
- Married at First Sight (2017–present)
- Mountain Bike Chronicles 2012 (2017)
- Money For Nothing (2017–present)
- Monkey Life (2017)
- Nothing On Earth (2017)
- Ocean Vet (2017)
- Oh My God (2017–present)
- Pet Island (2017)
- Predict My Future (2017)
- The Professionals (2017)
- Red Bull Cliptomaniacs (2017)
- Ryan Doyle Travel Story (2017)
- The Sheriffs Are Coming (2017–present)
- Take Heart (2017)
- Vet on the Hill (2017–present)
- 70 with a Six Pack (2017)

=== Kids/Teens ===
- The Adventures of Chuck and Friends (2017–present)
- Blue Zoo (2017–present)
- The Day My Butt Went Psycho! (2017–present)
- Ella the Elephant (2017–present)
- G.I. Joe: Renegades (2017)
- Hi-5 (2017–present)
- Kaijudo (2017–present)
- Max Steel (2017–present)
- Meet the Menagerie (2017–present)
- Pound Puppies (2017–present)
- Sidekick (2017–present)
- Strange Hill High (2017–present)
- Transformers: Rescue Bots (2017–present)
- Tree Fu Tom (2017–present)
- Willa's Wild Life (2017–present)
- SpongeBob SquarePants (2022-present)
- The Patrick Star Show (2022-present)
- Polly Pocket (2023-present)

=== Music ===
- BBC Music Awards (Note: Began from the 2016 edition of the event) (2017–present)
- Chart Folio (Note: Moved from ViuTV since episode 45) (2017–present)
- Front and Center: Grouplove (2017)
- Front and Center: Tom Odell (2017)
- Guitar Center Sessions: Muse (2017)
- Guitar Center Sessions: OneRepublic (2017)
- Guitar Center Sessions: Soundgarden (2017)
- Kylie - Kiss Me Once (2017)
- MusiCares - Neil Young (2017)
- One Love Manchester (2017)
- Robbie Williams - Take the Crown (2017)
- Sam Smith - Bestival (2017)

=== News, politics and finance ===
- Al Jazeera News Live (2017–present)
- CNN Newsroom (2017–2020)
- CNN News Stream (2017–2020)
- DW News (2017–present)
- 24K Finance (2019–2020)
- NHK Newsline (2017–present)
- The World Tonight (2020–present)
- ViuTV News (2017–present)
- Weekly Re-Viu (2017–present)
- 20/20 (2017–present)

=== Sports ===
- Hong Kong Sevens (2017–present)
- PGA Tour 2017 The Players Championship (2017–present)
- Red Bull Crashed Ice World Championship 2013 (2017)
- Red Bull Cliff Diving World Series 2013 (2017–present)
- Red Bull X-Fighters World Tour 2012 (2017)
- WWE Raw (2017–present)

== See also ==
- HK Television Entertainment
