= ATV World =

Hong Kong television channel

- Country: China
- Broadcast area: Hong Kong; Macau; Guangdong Province

Programming
- Language: English
- Picture format: 576i (PAL) 4:3; 576i (SDTV) 16:9

Ownership
- Owner: Asia Television

History
- Launched: 29 May 1957; 69 years ago
- Closed: 2 April 2016; 10 years ago
- Replaced by: RTHK TV 33A CCTV-1 Mandarin (on analogue)
- Former names: Rediffusion Television English Network (29 May 1957 – 29 September 1963); Rediffusion Television English Channel (30 September 1963 – 1 February 1967); RTV-2 (2 February 1967 – 23 September 1982); ATV English (24 September 1982 – 1 February 1987); ATV Diamond (2 February 1987 – 12 February 1989); ATV World (13 February 1989 – 2 April 2016)

Links
- Website: HKatv.com/World (in English)

Availability

Terrestrial
- Hong Kong Analogue: Varied by district
- Hong Kong Digital: Channel 16

ATV World
- Traditional Chinese: 國際台
Transcriptions
Yue: Cantonese
- Yale Romanization: Gwok zai tòih
- Jyutping: Gwok3 zai3 toi4

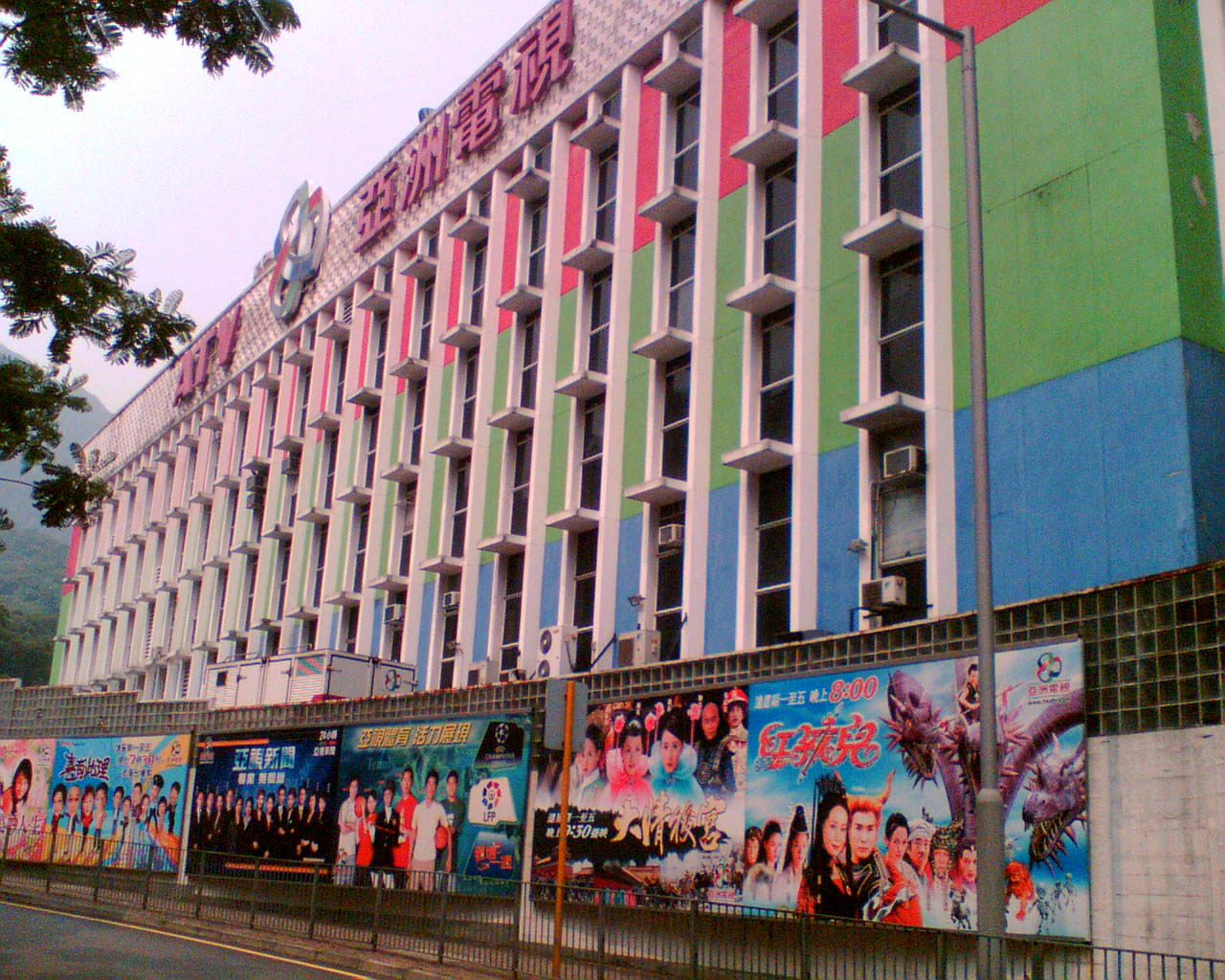
ATV headquarters building on Broadcast Drive.

ATV World, was one of two free-to-air English language television channels in Hong Kong, the other being its arch-rival TVB Pearl. Its sister station, ATV Home, broadcast in the Cantonese language. It is owned and operated by Asia Television, and was broadcast from the ATV Enterprises Office at 25–37 Dai Shing Street in Tai Po Innovation Park in Tai Po, which is in the Tai Po District, in the North East region of Hong Kong's New Territories.

== History ==
ATV World's English channel, Rediffusion Television, began as a cable-operated and subscription-based pay television service on 29 May 1957 known on-air as Rediffusion Television English Network

On 30 September 1963, the channel was renamed Rediffusion Television Cantonese Channel and Rediffusion Television English Channel. On 1 February 1967, the channels were renamed RTV-1 and RTV-2 respectively. On 1 December 1973, Rediffusion Television was granted a free-to-air terrestrial television broadcasting license for its two television channels, and closed its cable television channels. On 24 September 1982, Rediffusion Television was bought out by the new ATV, and consequently the Cantonese and English language channels were renamed ATV Cantonese and ATV English respectively. The channels were again renamed on 2 February 1987 as ATV Gold and ATV Diamond, and further renamed on 13 February 1989 as ATV Home and ATV World.

ATV World was a 24-hour channel with multi-lingual programmes, transmitted in NICAM in analogue version, and multiple AC-3 streams in digital version. While most of programmes were broadcast in Hong Kong English, a few were in either Standard Chinese, Korean, Filipino or Japanese without Hong Kong English. It was less popular than its English-language rival station TVB Pearl, though by a far smaller margin than ATV Home's loss to Hong Kong Cantonese rival TVB Jade.

On 6 June 2012, ATV gained access to the London 2012 Olympic Games broadcast rights, and consequently the Games were shown on ATV World.

On 1 April 2015, Hong Kong's Executive Council announced that ATV's broadcast license would not be renewed. ATV ceased over-the-air transmission on 1 April 2016. ATV plans to continue its business as a satellite and online broadcaster.

== Shows ==
ATV World was one of two English-language channels that broadcast in Hong Kong. It offered a variety of programmes, mostly from the United States, ranging from popular serial dramas and films to documentaries and educational shows.

ATV stopped carrying the talk show Late Show with David Letterman (大衛牙擦騷) as of 1 January 2009, but there was a grassroots movement to bring it back. Arts and sports programming were also offered (e.g. local horse racing, in Chinese 賽馬直擊). Mandarin and Korean programmes were available on ATV World at off-peak hours.

ATV World's flagship English news programme was the "Main News and Weather Report at 7:30" provided under the collective effort of ATV News. It also relayed the Xinwen Lianbo news programme from Chinese television channel, CCTV-1, which is the primary channel of the Chinese television network, China Central Television (CCTV), in the People's Republic of China which is also available throughout Hong Kong.

Given its focus on Hong Kong English-language programming in a predominantly Hong Kong Cantonese-speaking market, ATV World carried relatively little advertising and was subsidised by ATV Home. Both of the-then free-to-air television companies in Hong Kong were required by the government to provide a Hong Kong English-language service. In the face of competition from TVB Pearl, ATV World had in recent years switched its focus from the provision of drama and movies to documentaries and natural history shows, probably because such programming is less expensive to acquire.

Since the Hong Kong government does not have its own television station, its agency Radio Television Hong Kong (RTHK) required the-then two domestic free television stations to broadcast their programmes and advertisements. One of the well known programmes is Educational Television (ETV) which began in 1971. This followed the Hong Kong education syllabus, serving as a reference for primary and secondary school students of mathematics, Hong Kong English, Putonghua and other school subjects. During the thirty-two-week school year, ETV programmes were shown on ATV World from 10:00 to 12:00 and TVB Pearl from 14:00 to 16:00 each weekday.

=== Non-English programmes ===
Both ATV World and TVB Pearl were permitted by the Broadcasting Authority of Hong Kong to broadcast non-Hong Kong English programmes for up to 20% of their daily transmission time, outside peak viewing time. In fact, only 12% of TVB Pearl programmes are in languages other than Hong Kong English: 83.6% of those (10% of its total transmission time) are in Hong Kong Cantonese. The remainder include broadcasts in Japanese, Korean, Filipino and Hong Kong Cantonese.

== Schedules ==
Schedules were published in the South China Morning Post, The Standard and in other daily Hong Kong newspapers, including Chinese newspapers. ATV World operated its own official website which contained information about the programmes shown by the channel, and a streamed version of ATV News in English.
