= Airwave novel =

Airwave novels are stories told over radio broadcasts. It is a term mostly used within Hong Kong culture. The stories can be anywhere from 15 minutes to hours long.

== History ==
The first radio station to offer airwave novel entertainment in Hong Kong was Radio Rediffusion. Li Ngaw is generally considered the pioneer of the Chinese story broadcast format. Though he did not begin the art in Hong Kong as he was already doing the story broadcasts in Guangzhou, China. The art form was popular in Hong Kong during the 1950s.

The term "Airwave novel" was first suggested by director Yam Wu-fa, when he bought the rights to Crime Doesn't Pay in 1949. The film originally started out as the airwave novel titled Flame of Lust by Li Ngaw.

== Present ==
Today radio stations in Hong Kong continue to broadcast stories. The format largely consist of mogwai and jiangshi tales (鬼故, literally Ghost tales). A number of Hong Kong taxi drivers do tune into the shows regularly, since radio remains to be their main form of entertainment. The stories are also for people with a deep interest in urban legend type haunted stories. The format, however, is considered an older style alternative entertainment to present day internet, television etc.

== Broadcasters ==
- Li Ngaw (李我)
- Tang Kei-chen
- Chiang Sing
- Piu Yeung
- Fong Wing
- Siu Sheung (蕭湘)
- Ngai Mun
- Lui Kei-man (呂啟文)
- Lang Wun (冷魂)
- Chung Wai-ming (鍾偉明)

== See also ==
- Culture of Hong Kong
