= Quintrix =

Panasonic television tube

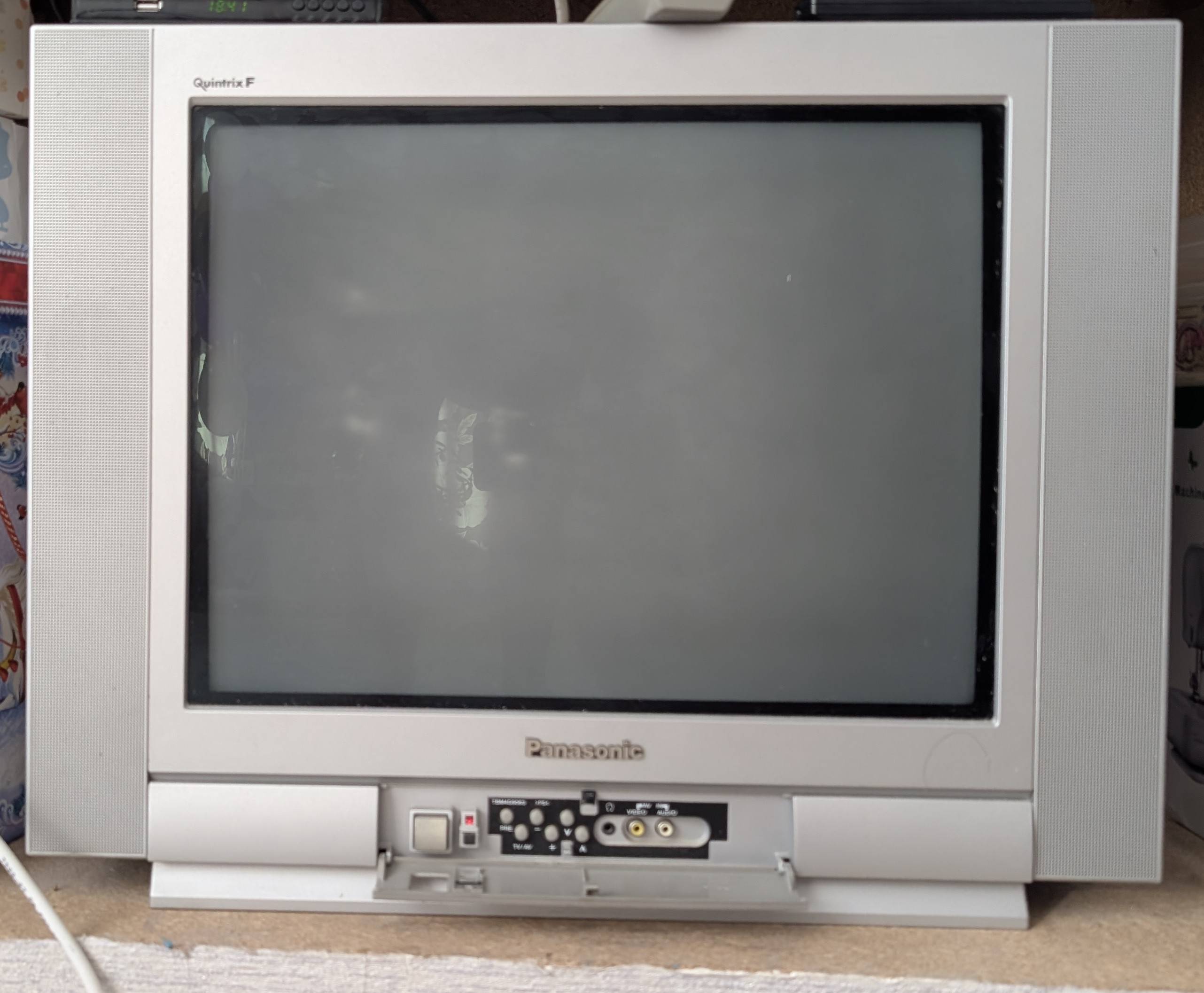
Panasonic Quintrix F TV Set

Quintrix is a name given to a flat and wide cathode-ray tube for televisions made by Panasonic. Quintrix tubes were first introduced to the market in 1974. The word originates from the Latin word "quintum", which means "fifth". So far there are three models of Quintrix available:

- Quintrix,
- Quintrix F, and
- Quintrix SR (SR = Super Resolution)

The first Quintrix cathode-ray tubes featured a prefocus lens that reduced beam diffusion, giving a sharper picture.

Manufactured in Malaysia and also in Wales with an MX-6 core, the Quintrix model was the standard television type for Hong Kong's etv project in 1999.
