= CTF Media and Entertainment =

Hong Kong telecom company

CTF Media and Entertainment Limited
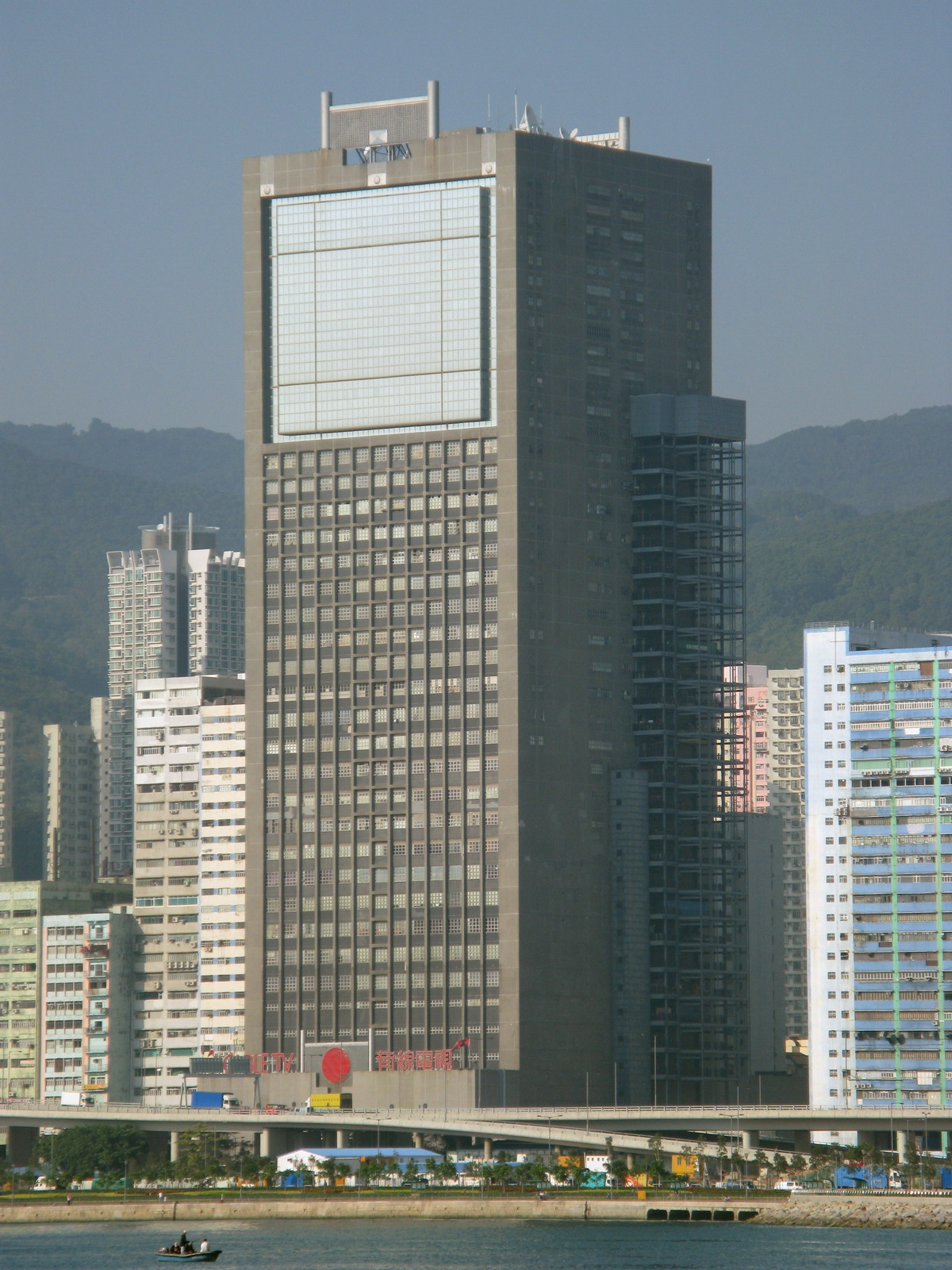
- Headquarters at Wharf Cable Tower
- Native name: 周大福媒體娛樂有限公司
- Type: Public
- Traded as: SEHK: 1097; Nasdaq: ICAB
- Industry: Television; Broadband internet
- Founded: 1999; 27 years ago
- Headquarters: Hong Kong
- Parent: Forever Top
- Subsidiaries: Hong Kong Cable Television; I-CABLE HOY

CTF Media and Entertainment Limited (Chinese: 周大福媒體娛樂有限公司), formerly known as i-Cable Communications Limited (Chinese: 有線寬頻通訊有限公司) is a Hong Kong telecommunications company owned by Forever Top (Asia) Limited, which acquired the company from The Wharf Group in 2017.

== Overview ==
Founded in 1999 as i-Cable Communications, the company provides broadband internet and pay-TV services. CTF also develops its fibre coaxial network (also used for the paid-TV service).

The broadband internet access service deploying cable modem based technology via the TCP/IP which is differed from the PPPoE technology provided by conventional carrier.

== Ownership ==
CTF also owns Hong Kong Cable Television, a cable television and Internet service provider, and i-CABLE HOY, a free-to-air television broadcaster.
