= Li Man-king =

Hong Kong broadcaster (1922–2021)

Li Man-King (Chinese: 李晚景; 16 February 1922 – 5 May 2021), also known by his nickname Li Ngaw (李我) or Lee Ngo was the pioneer of airwave novel radio broadcasting in Hong Kong.

== Career ==
He originally started broadcasting in Guangzhou, China. His fame preceded him to Hong Kong, where he performed story telling in Rediffusion Radio in 1949. In 1951 he worked for Macau's Radio Vilaverde Lda for a period of time. In 1957 he returned to Hong Kong to work for Commercial Radio until he retired in 1975. Many of his broadcasts were available at 12 noon to unemployed, the retired and housewives in the 1950s, when he worked for Radio Rediffusion. His novels were also adapted for Hong Kong cinema.

== Personal life ==
Li was born on 16 February 1922 to Li Dit-sai and Yip Oei Wan, a Chinese doctor. His ancestral hometown is in Xinhui County, Guangdong Province.

He was married to Siu Sheung.

== Death ==
On 5 May 2021, Lau Tin Chi announced on Facebook that Li had died, aged 99.

== See also ==
- Uncle Ray
