= ATV News =

ATV News 亞視新聞
- Country: Hong Kong
- Broadcast area: Regional
- Headquarters: Hong Kong

Ownership
- Owner: Asia Television

History
- Launched: May 29, 1957; 68 years ago
- Closed: April 1, 2016; 9 years ago

Links
- Website: www.hkatvnews.com

ATV News
- Traditional Chinese: 亞視新聞
Transcriptions
Standard Mandarin
- Hanyu Pinyin: Yàshì Xīnwén
Yue: Cantonese
- Yale Romanization: A sih sān mán
- Jyutping: A3 si6 san1 man2

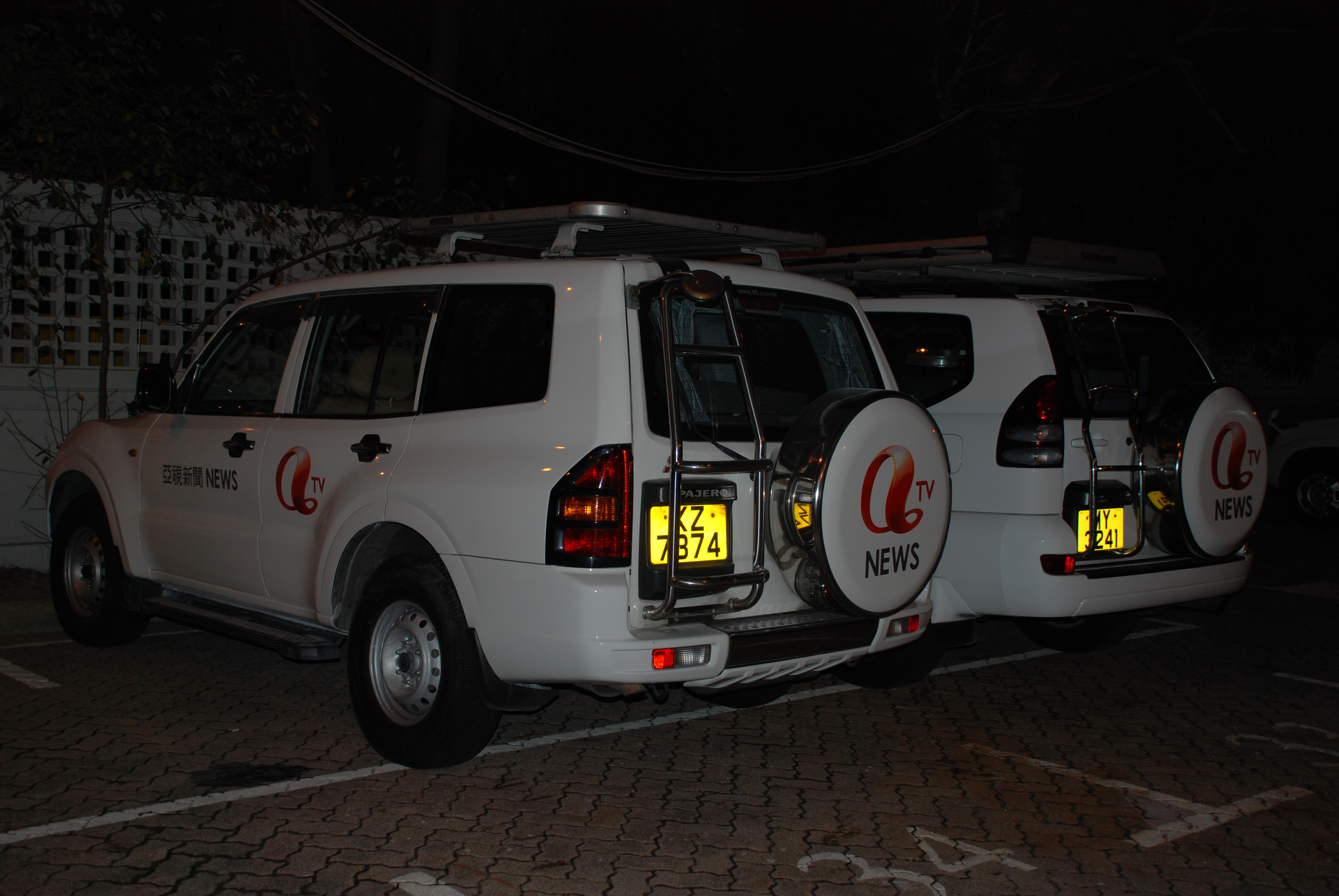
An ATV News car

ATV News (Chinese: 亞視新聞) was the newsgathering arm of ATV in Hong Kong. It provided news programmes to both its ATV Home and ATV World.

On 6 July 2011, ATV News falsely reported the death of Jiang Zemin, former General Secretary of the Chinese Communist Party. Wang Zheng, at that time rumoured to be a distant relative of Jiang, was believed to be the source. The Communications Authority fined ATV for HK$300,000 for the false news report, and later another HK$1 million after concluding Wang Zheng had been unlawfully interfering with ATV's management. Wang's cousin James Shing Pan-yu was forced to quit his role as executive director.

As a consequence of ATV's chronic financial difficulties, most newsgathering staff were laid off on 6 February 2016. ATV was ordered on 20 February 2016 to restore production of Cantonese news until the end of the period of its broadcast licence on 1 April 2016.

== Current affairs ==
Besides producing daily news reports, ATV offered eight news programmes in Cantonese, Mandarin, and English. Its news programmes broadcast in Cantonese were:

- Decoding Current Affairs (時事解碼)
- Following Ad Hoc News (時事熱點追蹤)
- Investment Strategy (窩輪有法)
- Mr. Tsang's Show (曾sir28騷)

Its two English-language news programmes were ATV Newsline, a discussion show, and ATV Inside Story, a topical magazine show.
