= Forever Top =

Forever Top (Asia) Limited (Chinese: 永升（亞洲）有限公司) is a company based in Hong Kong founded by David Chiu, the current head of Far East Consortium. The company initially applied for a free-to-air television broadcast license under the name of New Asia Network (NAN; Chinese: 新亞電視台). The company later withdrew the application, and acquired I-Cable Communications.

== Background ==
David Chiu is a son of Deacon Chiu Te-ken, the founder of Far East Consortium. Deacon Chiu bought Rediffusion Television (RTV) in 1982 and renamed it Asia Television (ATV) before he sold the broadcaster in 1989. Forever Top's free-to-air television bid, New Asia Network, was named in memory of ATV.

== New Asia Network ==
In 2015, Forever Top applied for a free-to-air television broadcast license under the name of New Asia Network. One of the company's goals was to acquire the assets of ATV, whose license would be revoked after 1 April 2016.

Channel name	Channel content	Transmission	Picture format	Proposed launch date
New Asia Network (新亞高清台)	Chinese channel targeting a general audience	Terrestrial	HDTV	Within 6 months after licence approval, if station manages to take over assets owned by Asia Television, or within 9 months after licence approval, by hiring another studio
New Asia International (新亞國際台)	English channel targeting the non-Chinese speaking audience	Terrestrial	SDTV	Within 6 months after licence approval, if station manages to take over assets owned by Asia Television, or within 9 months after licence approval, by hiring another studio
New Asia Sports (新亞體育台)	Sports channel, to be broadcast in Chinese	Terrestrial	SDTV	Within another 3 months after New Asia Network and New Asia International's start of broadcasting

Forever Top later withdrew the application and in 2017, the company acquired I-Cable Communications, the parent company of Hong Kong Cable Television and Fantastic Television.
