= HOY 77 =

- Country: China
- Broadcast area: Hong Kong; Macau
- Headquarters: Hong Kong

Programming
- Language: Cantonese
- Picture format: 1080i HDTV

Ownership
- Owner: CTF Media and Entertainment
- Parent: i-Cable HOY
- Sister channels: HOY 76; HOY 78

History
- Launched: 12 May 2017 (Test transmission); 14 May 2017 (Official launch)
- Former names: Fantastic TV Chinese Channel (2017-2018); HK Open TV (2018-2022); HOY TV (2022-2026)

Links
- Website: hoy.tv

Availability

Terrestrial
- Digital TV (Hong Kong): Channel 77 (HD)
- Digital TV (Macau): Channel 77 (HD)

Streaming media
- hoy.tv: Watch live (Hong Kong only, except "HOY Music" programme due to copyright issues.)

HOY 77 is a Cantonese language general entertainment television channel in Hong Kong operated by i-Cable HOY, whose parent company CTF Media and Entertainment also operates the IPTV platform Cable TV. Its sister station is the English-language channel HOY 76 and Cantonese news channel HOY 78.
