= Educational Television (Hong Kong) =

- 教育電視
- Genre: Educational
- Created by: RTHK; Education Bureau
- Country of origin: Hong Kong
- Original languages: English; Cantonese

Production
- Running time: 10–20 minutes

Original release
- Release: 1971 – 2020

Educational Television
- Traditional Chinese: 教育電視
Transcriptions
Yue: Cantonese
- Yale Romanization: Gaau yuhk dihn sih
- Jyutping: Gaau3 juk6 din6 si6

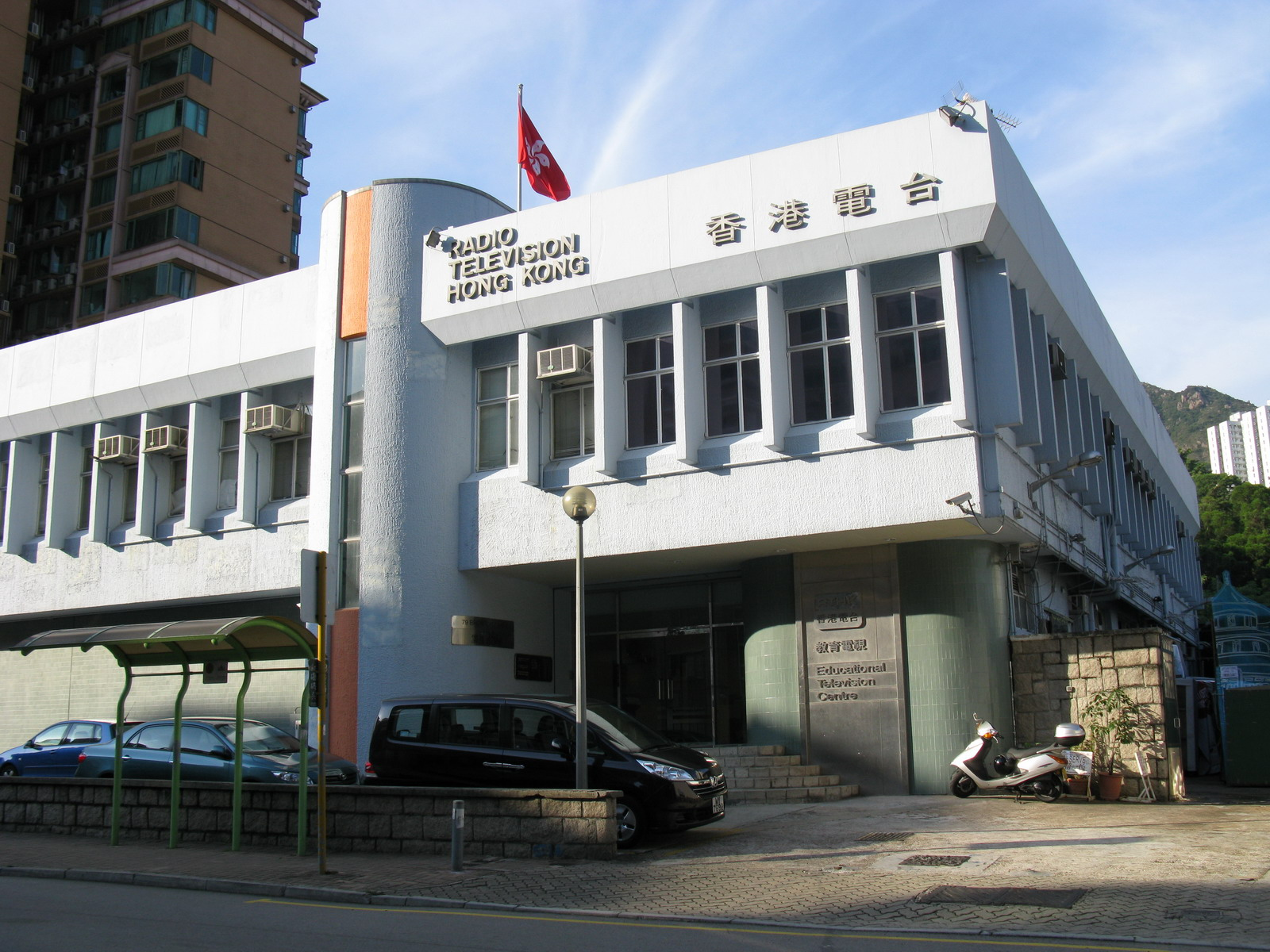
Educational Television Centre, Kowloon Tong

Educational Television (ETV) was a series of educational television programmes jointly produced by Radio Television Hong Kong and the Education Bureau (formerly the Education and Manpower Bureau / Education Department) of Hong Kong. ETV had been an auxiliary means for teaching the primary and secondary school curriculum on television since the early 1970s.

ETV programmes changed with the curriculum, covering a wide spectrum of topics. Programmes were broadcast during daytime non-peak hours on the English channels of TVB and ATV from Monday to Friday, during the 32 weeks of the school year. As internet popularity increased, ETV has made its programmes available online.

== History ==
ETV began with the primary school curriculum and developed gradually. In 1972, the first programme was aimed at Primary 3 students. It extended one level up yearly and covered Primary 6 in 1974. In September 1976, ETV started to cover junior secondary school. It began with Secondary 1 and reached Secondary 3 in 1978. There was no major change in range until 1999. ETV extended to Primary 1 and 2 in junior primary and Secondary 4 and 5 on selected topics in senior secondary school. In 2000, ETV also began to broadcast Teacher Resource Programmes for teachers.

In April 2020, ETV ceased filming new episodes. On 12 May 2020, the Education Bureau notified RTHK that it was to hand over the Education Television Centre in Kowloon Tong by September 2020.

== Programmes ==
The programmes were closely tied with the curriculum devised by Hong Kong Government. Most of programmes are in the Cantonese language. In the initial period, programmes covered the primary subjects of Chinese language, English language and Mathematics, and the secondary subjects Social Studies, Health Education (absent in secondary school) and Nature (later renamed to Science). Programme topics were changed weekly for primary school and biweekly for secondary school. The length of a programme is 15 minutes for primary school and 20 for secondary. The secondary subjects were eventually merged to General Studies for primary school as the curriculum changed. As Putonghua had become increasingly relevant in Hong Kong, it was eventually introduced into the Hong Kong curriculum, resulting in ETV producing programmes in the language. Social Studies for secondary schools was renamed to Personal, Social and Humanities Education.

== Media ==
During normal school terms, ETV programmes were broadcast from Monday to Friday (except some long school vacations like public holidays and weekend) on the free-to-air terrestrial television channels such as TVB Pearl and ATV World. Programmes were aired alternately so that one of the stations broadcasts ETV television programmes in the morning from 08:00 until 12:00 HKT on TVB Pearl and television programmes in the noon from 12:00 until 16:00 HKT on ATV World. In each academic year the two English free-to-air terrestrial television stations such: TVB Pearl and ATV World.

From school year 2006–07 to 2011–12, the broadcasting hours for ETV programmes reduced to 2 hours on each channel, which was scheduled from 08:30 until 10:30 HKT on TVB Pearl, and from 14:00 until 16:00 HKT on ATV World.

Beginning from school year 2012–13, the broadcasting hours further reduced to 1 hour on each channel, which is scheduled from 09:00 until 10:00 HKT (Morning session) on TVB Pearl and from 15:00 until 16:00 HKT (Afternoon session) on ATV World.

Due to the expiration of license of Asia Television on 2 April 2016, the Afternoon session of ETV programmes is scheduled from 15:00 until 16:00 HKT on RTHK 31A, which simulcast with Digital Channel RTHK 31.

Although each programme is broadcast several times a week, their broadcast times are not adapted to school class timetables. The government therefore provides necessary television and recording equipment for reception of ETV programmes for government schools and aided schools in Hong Kong. The recorded programmes can then be viewed out of the broadcast time frame as required by the school.

Some programmes are distributed in form of VCDs or interactive multimedia CD-ROMs to schools.

With the coming of the Internet age, ETV programmes and other materials can be obtained from ETV website eTVonline. Additionally, from June 6, 2020, the broadcasting hours of ETV on TVB Pearl will be lifted.
