= Hong Kong Cable Television =

Cable television provider

Hong Kong Cable Television Limited
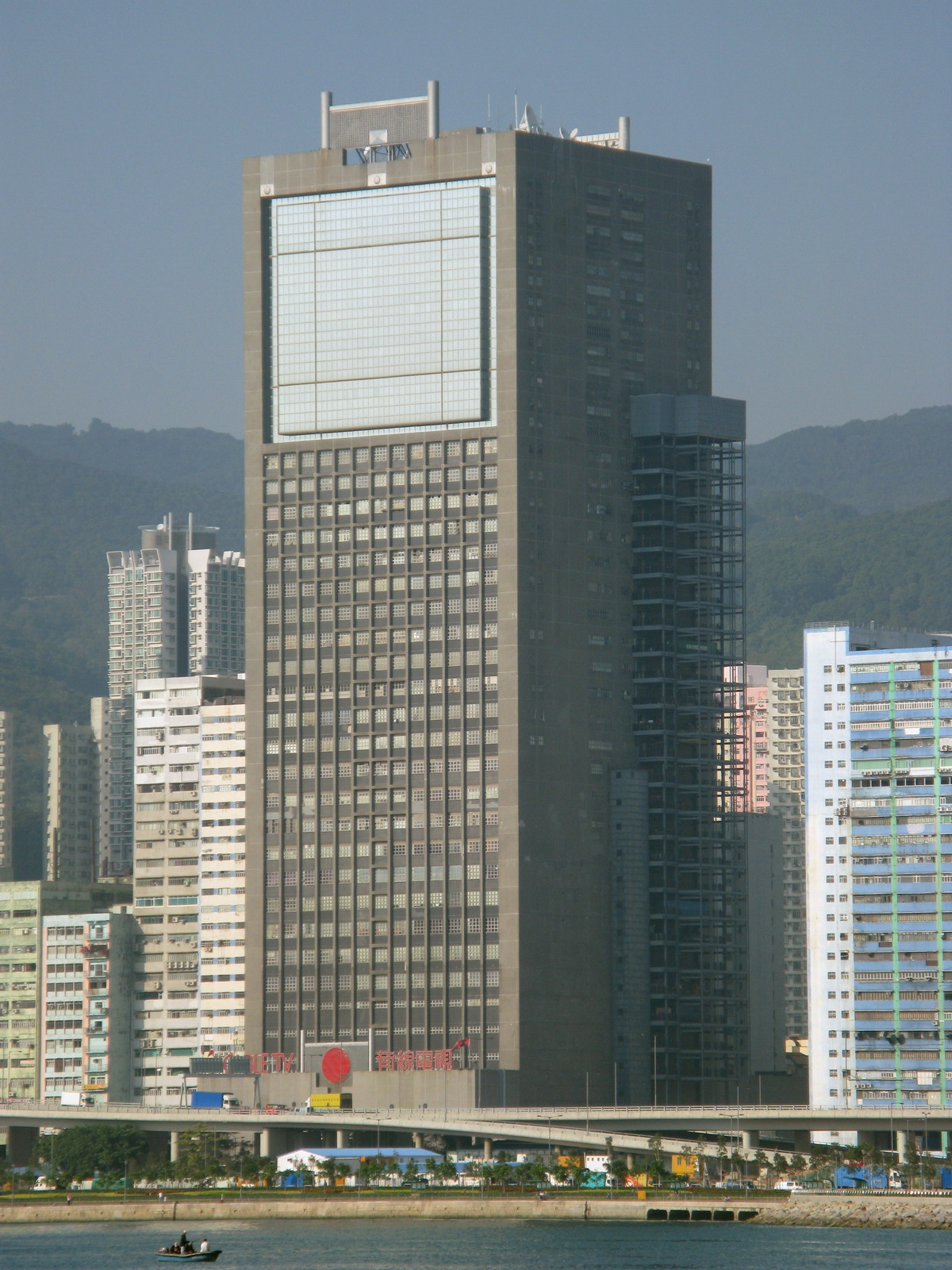
- Headquarters at Wharf Cable Tower
- Native name: 香港有線電視有限公司
- Formerly: Wharf Cable Television Limited
- Type: Subsidiary
- Founded: 31 October 1993; 32 years ago in British Hong Kong
- Defunct: 1 June 2023; 3 years ago in Hong Kong SAR (cable pay television services)
- Successor: i-CABLE HOY Limited
- Headquarters: Wharf Cable Tower, Number. 9 Hoi Shing Road, Tsuen Wan, New Territories, Hong Kong SAR, China
- Area served: Hong Kong
- Parent: i-Cable Communications
- Website: www.i-cable.com www.cabletv.com.hk

Hong Kong Cable Television Limited (Chinese: 香港有線電視有限公司), formerly known as Wharf Cable Television Limited (Chinese: 九倉有線電視有限公司) until 31 October 1998, is a cable television provider in Hong Kong currently owned by Forever Top (Asia) Limited, which operates it as a part of i-Cable Communications business. It was the second company to provide cable television services in Hong Kong (after Rediffusion Television, which ceased cable operation with the launch of their terrestrial television channels in 1973). It was incorporated on 30 June 1993 and officially inaugurated on 31 October same year, offering a package of over 100 pay television channels, 54 of which are directly operated by the company.

== History ==
The company was founded as Wharf Cable Television (Chinese: 九倉有線電視), incorporated on 30 June 1993. Cable-based transmissions were officially inaugurated by the Governor of Hong Kong Chris Patten. It went on air with eight channels, including the world's first 24-hour Cantonese news channel.

Wharf Cable Television changed its name to Hong Kong Cable Television (Chinese: 香港有線電視) on 31 October 1998. It was listed on the Hong Kong Stock Exchange in 1999 under i-Cable Communications.

With the largest number of subscribers of subscription television companies in Hong Kong, HKCTV became one of the top five media groups in Hong Kong. According to the financial summary of i-CABLE Communications Limited in 2004, its sales revenue reaches HK$2,372 million with a profit of HK$296 million.

In February 2023, Cable TV announced to fold their pay-television licenses over to the Hong Kong government six years earlier than planned as they no longer compete with Now TV and TVB's MyTV Super, along with streaming giants Netflix and Disney+. The pay-TV services would stop operations on 1 June of the same year. Since then, the company would put their focus on three of their currently existed free-TV channels: Hong Kong International Business Channel (now HOY76), HOY TV (now HOY77) and HOY Infotainment (now HOY78).

== Ownership ==
In 2017, i-Cable was sold to Forever Top (Asia) Limited.

In 2021, Henry Cheng Kar-Chun, the chairman of New World Development, pumped up his stake in i-Cable by acquiring shares from chairman of Far East Consortium David Chiu Tat-cheong through Cheng's company Celestial Pioneer. This increased Celestial Pioneer's stake in Forever Top from 31.5% to 72%, making it the largest shareholder of the company.

== Controversy ==
i-Cable TV fired at least 40 journalists, editors, and production crew, including the whole team of News Lancet (an award-winning investigative journalism show) in December 2020. The management claimed the firings were simply to "save resources". However, Hong Kong Journalists' Association (HKJA) questioned the real aim was reducing or eliminating the reporting of sensitive news, after the team of News Lancet covered stories critical of the police and the authorities in 2019.
