= Plus TV =

Hong Kong television channel

Plus TV 文化資訊頻道
- Broadcast area: Hong Kong
- Headquarters: Tai Po, Hong Kong

Ownership
- Owner: ATV
- Sister channels: aTV3

History
- Launched: December 2, 2007(testing); December 31, 2007 (broadcast)
- Closed: April 01, 2009

Plus TV (Chinese: 文化資訊頻道, aTV5) was a television channel produced by Asia Television, which broadcast from December 31, 2007, until April 1, 2009.

== History ==
Plus TV started test broadcasting on December 2, 2007, and official broadcasting on December 31, 2007. It could be watched only with a standard-definition television or better. It closed on April 1, 2009, as Asia Television restructured their channels.

== Program ==
Plus TV mainly broadcast for information, culture and tradition, buying programs from the National Geographic Channel, Discovery Channel, BBC, NHK and RTHK.

== See also ==
- His TV
- Her TV
