= ViuTV News =

- Opening sequence
- Also known as: ViuTVsix News
- Genre: News; Current affairs
- Presented by: Brittyn Clennett; Diane To; Patrick Fok

Production
- Production location: Hong Kong
- Running time: 15 to 30 minutes (including adverts)
- Production companies: Reuters (2017-2020); Now News (2020-present)

Original release
- Network: ViuTVsix
- Release: 31 March 2017 – present

ViuTV News is the flagship evening news programme on Hong Kong English language television channel ViuTVsix and is produced by Now News. The programme airs twice every evening; at 7:30 p.m. and later at 11:30 pm with an updated version.

Prior to 30 November 2020, HK Television Entertainment broadcast the English news programme "News Roundup" which was produced by Reuters. On 30 November 2020, HK Television Entertainment terminated their contract with Reuters and switched to produce English news on their own, under Now News. The programme continues to use provided clips by Now News with foreign clips being provided by The Associated Press. The new programme no longer has an anchor to report the news.

== Broadcast period ==
=== Evening Edition ===
- Daily：19:00-19:15

=== Late Night Edition ===
- Monday to Wednesday and Friday：23:30-23:45
- Saturday：23:00-23:15
- Thursday and Sunday：It will be broadcast after the movie time on Thursdays and Sundays

== Main newscasters (Reuters era) ==
- Brittyn Clennett (2017–present)
- Diane To (2017–2019)
- Joel Flynn (2017–present)
- Joel Labi (2017–present)
- Melanie Ralph (2017–present)
- Patrick Fok (2017–2018)

== Relief newscasters (Reuters era) ==
- Daniel Epstein (2017–present)
- Evelina Leung (2017–2019)
- Emma Smith (2017–present) [Business]
- Grace Brown (2017–present) [Business]
- Joseph Kim (2017–present)
- Pamela Ambler (2017–2018) [Business]
