= His TV =

Hong Kong television channel

His TV 動感資訊頻道
- Broadcast area: Hong Kong
- Headquarters: Tai Po, Hong Kong

Ownership
- Owner: ATV
- Sister channels: aTV4

History
- Launched: December 2, 2007 (testing); December 31, 2007 (broadcast)
- Closed: April 01, 2009

His TV (Chinese: 動感資訊頻道, aTV3) was a television channel produced by Asia Television, which broadcast from December 31, 2007, until April 1, 2009.

== History ==
His TV started test broadcasting on December 2, 2007, and official broadcasting on December 31, 2007. It could be watched only with a standard-definition television or better. It closed on April 1, 2009, as Asia Television restructured their channels.

== Program ==
His TV mainly targeted a male audience, with programs on topics such as sports, cars.

== See also ==
- Her TV
- Plus TV
