= Her TV =

Hong Kong television channel

Her TV 魅力資訊頻道
- Broadcast area: Hong Kong
- Headquarters: Tai Po, Hong Kong

Ownership
- Owner: ATV
- Sister channels: aTV3

History
- Launched: December 2, 2007 (tests); December 31, 2007
- Closed: April 1, 2009
- Replaced by: CTi Asia (terrestrial channel space)

Her TV (Chinese: 魅力資訊頻道, aTV4) was a television channel produced by Asia Television, which broadcast from December 31, 2007 until April 1, 2009.

== History ==
Her TV started test broadcasting on December 2, 2007 and official broadcasting on December 31, 2007. It could be watched only with a standard-definition television or better. It closed on April 1, 2009, as Asia Television restructured their channels.

== Program ==
Her TV mainly targeted a female audience, with such broadcasting as cosmic and fashion programs. It co-operated with a famous model international company, Icon Models, as the digit icon of the channel.

== See also ==
- His TV
- Plus TV
