= Wharf Cable Tower =

Building in Tsuen Wan, Hong Kong

Cable TV Tower
- 有線電視大樓
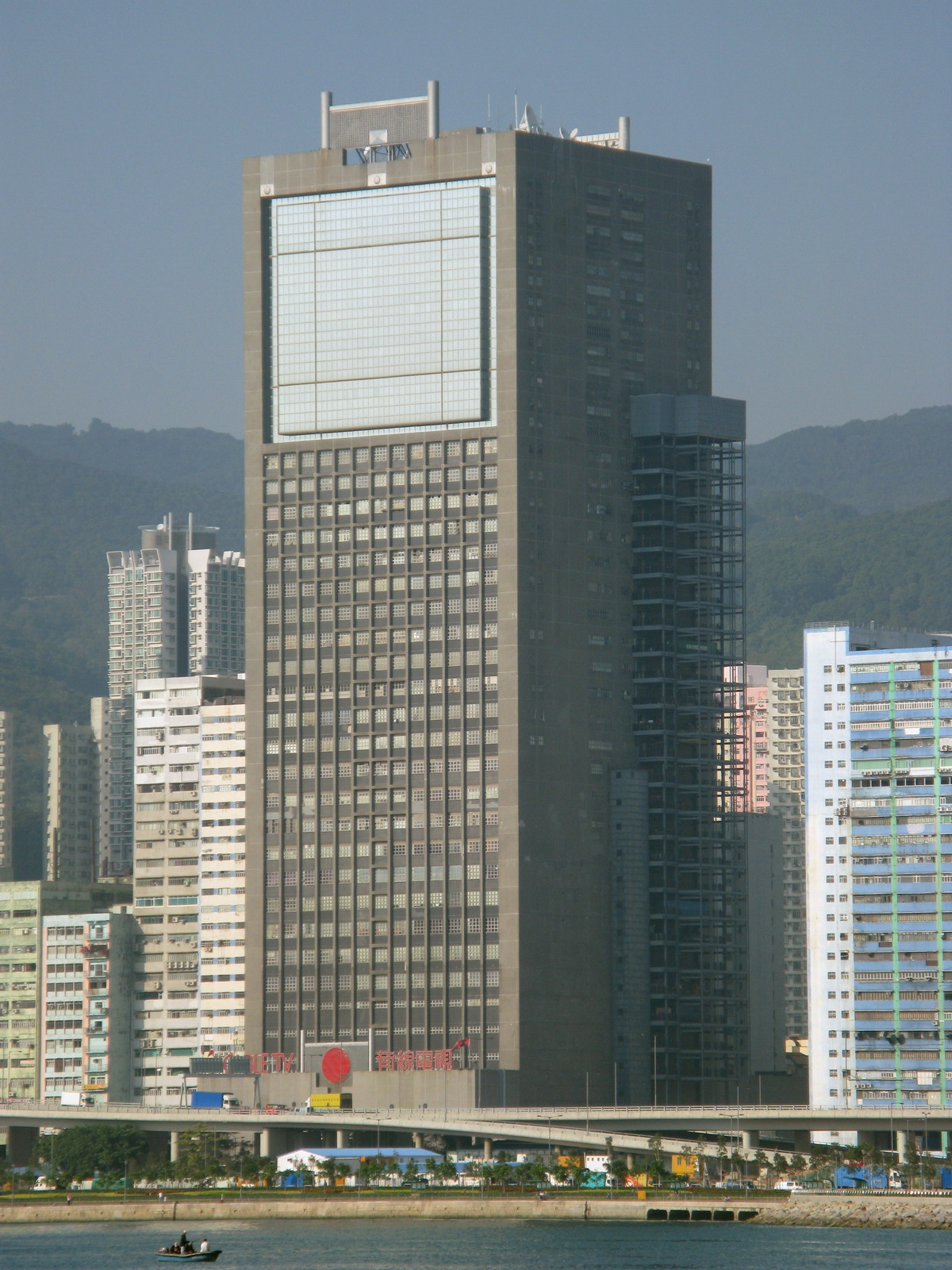
- Interactive map of the Cable TV Tower area

General information
- Status: Completed
- Type: Office / Industrial
- Location: Tsuen Wan, Hong Kong
- Coordinates: 22°22′22.7″N 114°06′25.7″E
- Opening: 1993

Height
- Antenna spire: 197 metres (646 ft)
- Roof: 186 metres (610 ft)
- Top floor: 173 metres (568 ft)

Technical details
- Floor count: 41

Design and construction
- Architect: DLN Architects and Engineers

The Cable TV Tower (Chinese: 有線電視大樓) is a skyscraper located in Tsuen Wan in Hong Kong which was completed in 1993. The large building stands 197 metres (646 ft) tall with 41 floors of office and industrial space situated between Hoi Shing Road and Chai Wan Kok Street. The skyscraper is also the tallest 'office / industrial' building in the city (though many purely commercial properties are much higher). Attached to the southeast side of the building is an intermodal container (shipping container) elevator capable of lifting 40-foot containers to thirty floors up.

== See also ==
- List of tallest buildings in Hong Kong
