= Asia Television =

Online media company in Hong Kong

Asia Television 亞洲電視

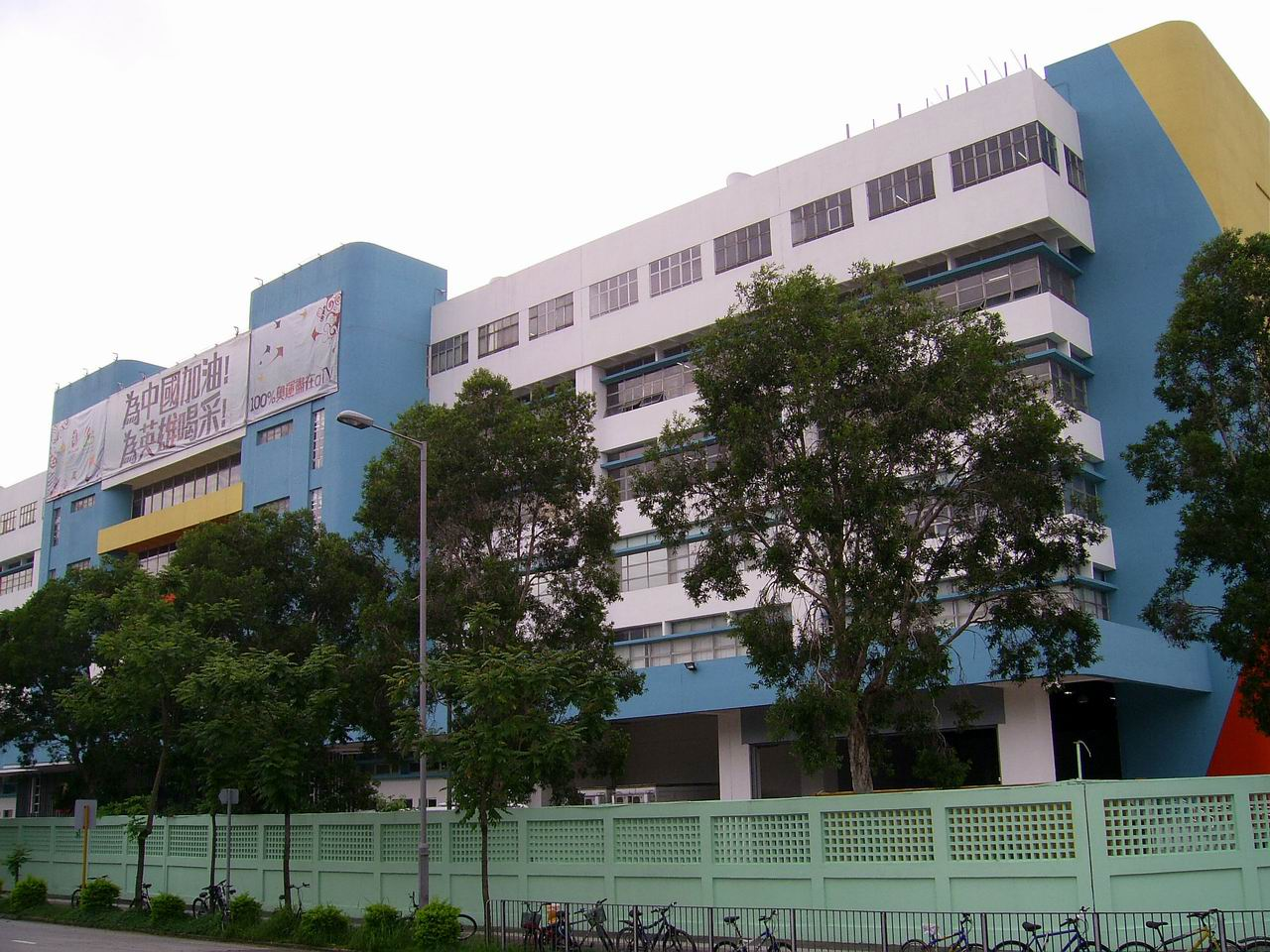
- Headquarters in Tai Po
- Native name: 亞洲電視有限公司
- Type: Limited company
- Industry: Internet-based media
- Predecessor: Rediffusion Television
- Founded: 29 May 1957 (as Rediffusion Television); 24 September 1982 (as ATV, TV broadcaster); Revived in 2019 into APP (as ATV, OTT service provider)
- Headquarters: 33 Dai Shing Street, Tai Po Industrial Estate, Tai Po, Hong Kong
- Key people: Lai Chai Suang (main investor); Ip WP Leong (executive director), Andy Yong (non-executive director)
- Owner: Asia Television Holdings Ltd.
- Website: www.hkatv.com

Asia Television
- Traditional Chinese: 亞洲電視
- Simplified Chinese: 亚洲电视
Transcriptions
Standard Mandarin
- Hanyu Pinyin: Yàzhōu Diànshì
Yue: Cantonese
- Jyutping: aa^{3} zau^{1} din^{6} si^{6}

Alternative Chinese name
- Traditional Chinese: 亞視
- Simplified Chinese: 亚视
Transcriptions
Standard Mandarin
- Hanyu Pinyin: Yàshì
Yue: Cantonese
- Jyutping: aa^{3} si^{6}

Asia Television Limited (Chinese: 亞洲電視有限公司, also known as ATV) is a digital media and broadcasting company in Hong Kong. Established as Hong Kong's first television service under the name Rediffusion Television (麗的電視/麗的呼聲) on 29 May 1957, it shifted to terrestrial television in 1973 and was renamed Asia Television (ATV) in 1982. ATV operated two principal over-the-air channels: the Cantonese ATV Home and the English ATV World.

Despite its relatively small market share, ATV received awards for its programmes. Among its notable successes was its local version of the British game show Who Wants to Be a Millionaire? in 2001, which increased viewership. After 2000, ATV faced a gradual decline in production quality and viewership, as well as financial difficulties – a process that accelerated under the leadership of Wang Zheng, a major shareholder. ATV's credibility was severely damaged in 2011 after its news department had falsely reported the death of Jiang Zemin.

On 1 April 2015, Hong Kong's Executive Council announced that ATV's broadcast licence would not be renewed. ATV's channels ceased over-the-air transmission on 1 April 2016. ATV announced plans to continue business as a digital and satellite broadcaster. The company announced its subscription-based internet content streaming operations in December 2017.

== History ==
=== 1949–1981: Early years ===
Rediffusion Television (RTV), the predecessor to ATV, began as a wired radio broadcasting service in 1949. The original office was located on Arsenal Street and Hennessy Road, Wan Chai, Hong Kong. It launched its subscription-based TV service on 29 May 1957. In 1959, Rediffusion was moved to the offices that were occupied by Fortis Bank Tower.

In 1962, Rediffusion broadcast the first-ever fundraising special in the wake of Hong Kong's Typhoon Wanda, which caused 130 deaths. The first televised artist training course was broadcast in 1966 under the title Ying Li’s Voice. First color broadcast started in 1967.

In October 1968, new shows were broadcast on Rediffusion, including variety, sports, and other leisure, attracting more viewers. The most notable show was "Master Q". It also led the trend in acquiring Japanese anime shows, including Osamu Tezuka's Astro Boy in 1966.

Rediffusion was given a free-to-air television broadcasting licence in 1973 by the Hong Kong Government, which had switched to using wireless television. Rediffusion (later ATV) and TVB (launched on 19 November 1967) formed a duopoly in free-to-air terrestrial TV broadcasting in Hong Kong for more than 40 years. A third broadcaster, Commercial Television, entered the market in September 1975, but in the face of intense competition from the two rival broadcasters, ceased transmissions in August 1978.

In 1976, the Hong Kong government introduced Mark Six, a new lottery system that was broadcast twice a week on Rediffusion. The first host of that show was Ha Chun-Chau (夏春秋).

=== 1981–2002: Development ===
In 1981, Rediffusion in the UK sold 61% of its shares in RTV to an Australian consortium. In July 1982, a Chinese enterprise called Far East Group (遠東機構), owned by the Chiu family, took a stake in the company, resulting in Far East Group and the Australian consortium each holding 50% of RTV’s shares. The move marked the first time that a Chinese enterprise had partly owned RTV. RTV was renamed "Asia Television" later in the same year. The company operating ATV frequently recorded losses, and in January 1984, following the withdrawal of the Australian enterprise, the Chiu family acquired the company.

In August 1987, the shares of ATV were put up for sale. One year later, Asia Television Limited, the Lim family (led by Lim Por-yen), and the New World Group each owned one-third of the shares. At that time, the members of the board of directors included Deacon Chiu, Lim Por-yen, Fang Li and Cheng Yu-tung.

On 30 January 1989, the Chiu family sold its shares of ATV to New World Group and Lai Sun Group for HK$237.5 million. The New World Group held half of the shares, while the Lam family owned one-third and Lai Sun held one-sixth. At the same time, Sociedade de Turismo e Diversões de Macau (STDM) joined as a minority shareholder. Cheng Yue-tung became chairman, Lim Por Yen vice-chairman, and Selina Chow administrative director.

=== 2002–2010: Ownership shift ===
In November 2002, Lai Sun Development, which was heavily indebted following the HK$7 billion acquisition of the Furama Hotel in 1997 at the height of the property bubble, announced that it would sell its 32.75% stake to the company's chief executive, Chan Wing-kee, for HK$360 million in cash.

In June 2007, Chan, along with Liu Changle, chairman of Phoenix Satellite Television Holdings Limited, established a company that later bought most of ATV's shares. Afterwards, Chan Wing-kei became Administrative Director General. Following the change in shareholders, the company introduced changes to its production direction, marketing strategy, and human resources management. The network increased the purchase of foreign programmes, such as the South Korean drama Autumn in My Heart.

In December 2008, City Telecom chairman Ricky Wong Wai Kay was assigned as the new chief executive, while former PCCW deputy chairman Linus Cheung Wing-lam became executive chairman. After just 2 weeks, Ricky Wong resigned from his position due to many factors. In early 2009, Taiwanese billionaire Tsai Eng-Meng signed a preliminary agreement to become a key shareholder of Alnery, a company that controls 47.58% of ATV. Tsai has agreed to inject HK$1 billion in the form of convertible bonds. Tsai and Payson Cha have since debated over control of the station.

=== 2010–2015: Decline ===
Former logo (2007–2016)

Hong Kong's other main television broadcaster, TVB, was regarded as the driving force behind ATV's decision to transform its pay TV operation to terrestrial TV broadcasting. For many years, TVB has been the predominant rating leader in Hong Kong. Its programmes often capture 90–95% of the viewing audience. In the previous renewal cycle, ATV’s licence was renewed in December 2004 for another 12 years. Under the new terms of the licence, the Broadcasting Authority required that ATV World provide bilingual subtitles on news, weather, and current affairs shows, educational shows, and public service announcements, as well as more cultural and arts shows. In its final years, viewing figures for ATV Home had fallen sharply, as the TV station had begun to cater more to the interests of the mainland Chinese audience, who could now legally receive the channel. In the Pearl River Delta area of China, ATV used to enjoy a 70% ratings share in the late 1990s, largely due to rebroadcasting rights. The ratings share has since reduced to 2–3%. The shift resulted in Hong Kong viewers complaining that programmes aired on the channel are "old-fashioned" and not in tune with the preferences of the Hong Kong TV audience.

In 2010, Chinese property businessman Wang Zheng became known as ATV's "major shareholder" and began to exercise actual control over the board of directors when his relative-in-law Wong Ben Koon, who is a Hong Kong resident, purchased 52% of ATV's shares from Cha's brothers and other shareholders, although Wang himself was not a member of the board. Observers believed this arrangement bypassed Hong Kong’s broadcasting regulations, which forbid non-Hong Kong residents to own and control local television stations. Stating his plan to shape ATV into "Asia's CNN" and "Hong Kong's conscience", Wang replaced the production of television drama series with talk shows, which contributed to further loss of ATV's audience and advertisers.

On 6 July 2011, ATV News falsely reported the death of Jiang Zemin, former General Secretary of the Chinese Communist Party. Wang Zheng, at that time, who was rumoured to be a distant relative of Jiang, was believed to be the source. The Communications Authority fined ATV HK$300,000 for the false news report and later another HK$1 million after concluding Wang Zheng had been unlawfully interfering with ATV's management. Wang's cousin James Shing Pan-yu was forced to quit his role as executive director. ATV came under heavy pressure from the community when its ATV Focus smeared anti-Moral and National Education pupils and when it broadcast a live show of Wang leading a group of artists dancing in front of the Central Government Offices to call for the government not to issue new free-to-air licences.

On 19 June 2013, the Hop Chung Tourist Car Company – a long-time transport contractor of ATV – filed a lawsuit asking the High Court to wind up ATV over unpaid bills totalling HK$900,000. ATV executive director James Shing denied the station was experiencing financial problems. In 2014, the court ruled in Tsai's favour that Wang Zheng was responsible for ATV's business failure and appointed Deloitte to seek a white knight to take over Wong Ben-koon's controlling shares.

ATV had also failed to pay wages to its employees; at the end of December 2014, the company said it would shortly pay half the back wages of its staff for September. By early January, the company still owed the balance of salaries outstanding since November, and there were several terminations and redundancies as a result of the operating difficulties. ATV and its executive director, Ip Ka-po, received 34 prosecution notices from the Labour Department concerning unpaid wages from July through September. In late January 2015, the company, still facing liquidity issues, controversially advanced the outstanding salaries to employees for December on condition that employees signed a loan agreement with the company belonging to the major shareholder, Wong Ben-koon.

=== 2015–2017: Loss of licence ===
On 31 March 2015, ATV announced during its evening news that its main shareholders had agreed to sell their stake in the company to Ricky Wong's Hong Kong Television Network (which was the subject of a failed bid for an over-the-air licence before electing to launch as an internet television service instead). Although he had met with ATV staff a few days prior, Wong denied that a deal had been made, while legislators argued that the report was intended to mislead the Executive Council into believing that ATV was in the process of addressing its financial issues.

On 1 April 2015, the Executive Council ruled that it would not renew ATV's broadcasting licence. Secretary for Commerce and Economic Development Gregory So explained that ATV's performance was "unsatisfactory" and had "clearly deteriorated after the mid-term review of its licence", and that the Communications Authority "[had] serious doubts as to whether ATV would be capable of making the necessary improvements, and whether it has the financial capability to deliver its investment plans, and indeed to continue its business as a going concern". As Hong Kong law requires broadcasters to be given one year's notice in the event of licence revocation, the licence was provisionally extended to 1 April 2016, after which ATV was required to cease broadcasting. Concurrently, the government announced the approval of an over-the-air licence to a new broadcasting company, HK Television Entertainment. The government also allowed RTHK to take over ATV's analogue broadcast spectrum; RTHK planned to use the spectrum to broadcast an expanded version of its channel 31 service.

On 7 February 2016, after over 200 employees resigned from the company in the previous week, ATV was forced to suspend its news programming due to a lack of staff. The broadcaster planned to restore newscasts following the Chinese New Year holiday. The Communications Authority threatened to fine ATV over the suspension, as it violated conditions of its licence requiring the daily broadcast of the 15-minute evening newscasts in Cantonese and English. On 22 February 2016, the Communications Authority announced that it would issue a 30-day suspension to ATV effective April 2016 for violating licence conditions relating to news programming and missed licence fee payments. Although ATV will have ceased broadcasting by then due to the expiration of its licence, the CA stated that it still issued the penalty out of fairness, because not doing so "would send a wrong message to the broadcasting sector, that a beleaguered and cash-strapped licensee would be given a carte blanche to contravene the BO and licence conditions" with few consequences.

On 24 February 2016, the High Court of Hong Kong appointed the firm Deloitte to serve as a provisional liquidator for ATV's assets. On 29 February 2016, Deloitte announced that as part of the liquidation process, all of ATV's staff would be laid off. On 3 March 2016, Deloitte announced that it was in the process of winding down ATV's operations and planned to shut down the network as soon as possible. However, RTHK stated that it would not be ready to take over ATV's analogue spectrum with its new programming until 10 March at the latest. On 7 March, only a day after the layoffs took effect, China Cultural Media Group reached a deal to invest in ATV and pay outstanding staff wages for 2016 and operating costs for March, allowing the network to rehire 160 employees to continue operating ATV in the interim. However, the outstanding wages would not be paid until 2 April. An ATV spokesperson stated that the broadcaster was considering alternate outlets for its programming following the shutdown, including the internet.

==== Final day of broadcast ====
The final programme aired by ATV Home was a repeat of a special celebrating the 25th anniversary of the Miss Asia Pageant. Although a public relations manager stated that ATV was planning to broadcast one more edition of the Miss Asia Pageant before ATV's shutdown, former producer Wingo Ng stated that ATV did not have enough money and staff to produce such a programme.

ATV's channels signed off shortly before midnight local time on 1 April. RTHK TV 31 and TV33 (CGTN Documentary) began broadcasting on ATV's analogue channels shortly after midnight on 2 April 2016. HKTVE also soft-launched its new digital channel, ViuTV, ahead of its formal launch on 6 April.

==== Debt resolved ====
After ATV formally ceased free TV broadcasting, ATV Investor Secretary Rong Rongbin pledged shares of Star Platinum Corporation, which holds 99% of its shares, to borrow HK$300 million from Xiesheng Xiefeng to save ATV but did not repay on time; therefore, in July 2016, it acquired the full equity of Star Platinum. It was also reported that about HK$35 million in unpaid wages of 640 former employees and HK$18 million from the Insolvency Fund were also paid after the company had acquired its majority stake.

=== 2017–present: Ventures after loss of licence ===
Asia Television Digital Media Limited
- Native name: 亞洲電視數碼媒體有限公司
- Formerly: Total Star Enterprise Limited (8 November-12 December 2016); Asia Television New Media Group Limited (12 December 2016 – 30 October 2017)
- Founded: 8 November 2016; 9 years ago
- Headquarters: New Territories, Hong Kong, China
- Area served: Hong Kong
- Owner: Asia Television Holdings Ltd.

In December 2017, ATV announced that the company would continue business with its new mobile app and OTT services, delivering programmes and shows through the internet instead of terrestrial broadcasting. The company also announced a new series of Baak Maan Fu Yung (the local version of Who Wants to Be a Millionaire?), which is hosted by former general manager of TVB, Stephan Chan. The app also includes previous ATV original dramas and documentaries. The OTT service is operated by ATV's subsidiary, Asia Television Digital Media Limited.

In June 2018, ATV announced the reboot of the Miss Asia Pageant after the hiatus in 2015. Partnered with South Korean company CJ E&M, the pageant was described as "ATV's biggest investment of the year".

In 2020, ATV partnered with UK production company Phoenix Waters Productions to relaunch their drama department and develop a slate of films, series, and variety shows spearheaded by PWP CEO Bizhan Tong. This would start with the international thriller Lockdown (2021), to be filmed around the world during the 2020 pandemic and feature a global cast including John Savage, Xander Berkeley, and Anita Chui. In 2021, AMM Global Media was formed with Tong as executive director, acquiring all 19 of Tong's creative projects, including Lockdown, to focus entirely on creative entertainment with international appeal.

On 7 September 2022, the High Court ordered Asia Television Digital Media to be liquidated. ATV issued a statement stating that only Asia Television Digital Media would be liquidated and that Asia Television Holdings and its subsidiary Asia Momentum Media would continue providing content.

== Location ==
On 21 July 2007, ATV left its long-time home at 81 Broadcast Drive in Kowloon Tong and moved into a new facility in Tai Po. The original home was demolished in 2008–2009 and is now a residential development called Meridian Hill.

The Tai Po production facilities cover 550,000 square feet (51,000 m^{2}) and are approximately three times larger than the former facilities on Broadcast Drive. The Tai Po facilities have four news studios, eight variety show and drama studios, and a range of digital broadcasting facilities. The largest studio covers 20,000 square feet (1,900 m^{2}). The new headquarters is the former site of Lee Kum Kee's Hong Kong headquarters and factory operations.

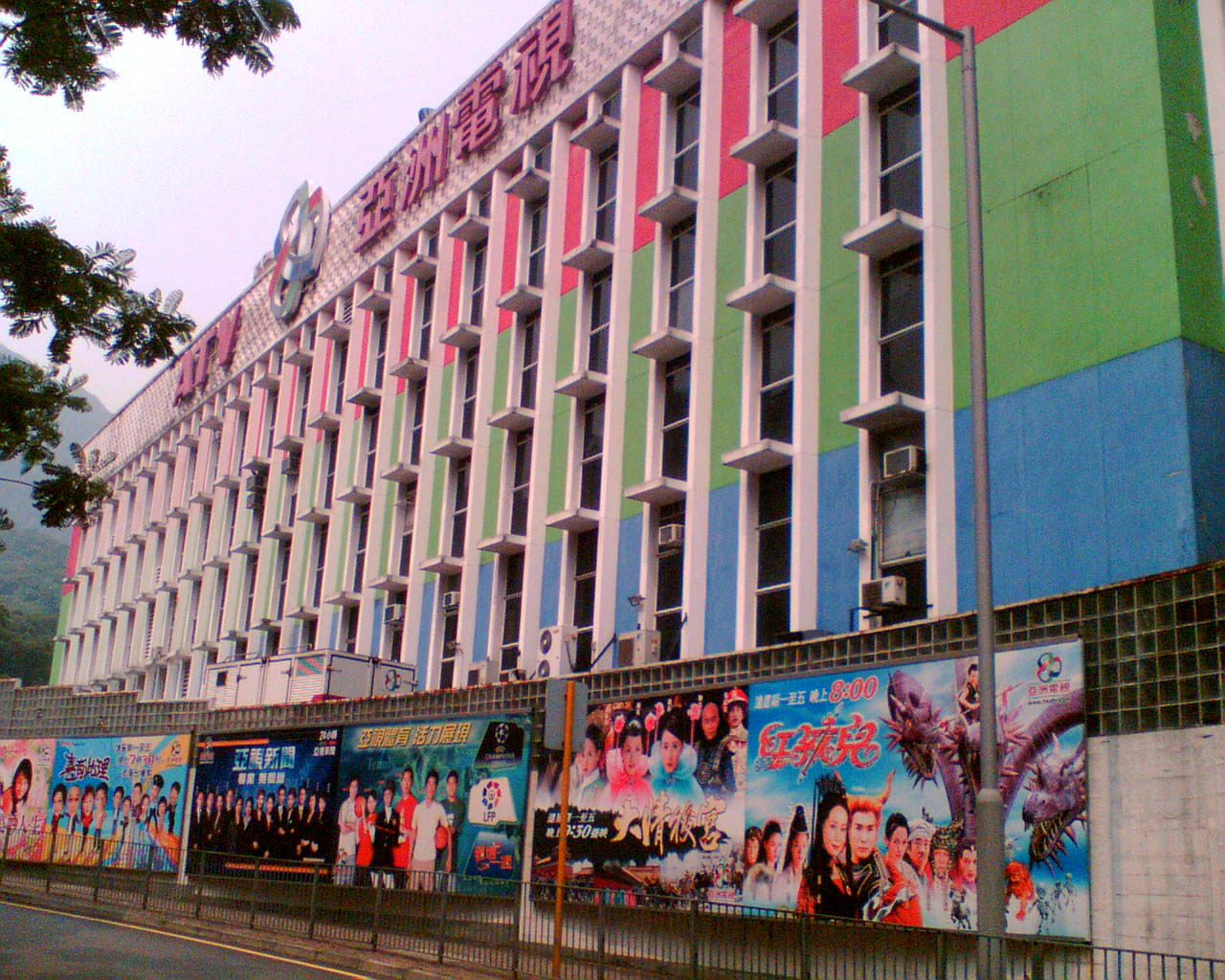
Former ATV headquarters on Broadcast Drive (demolished)

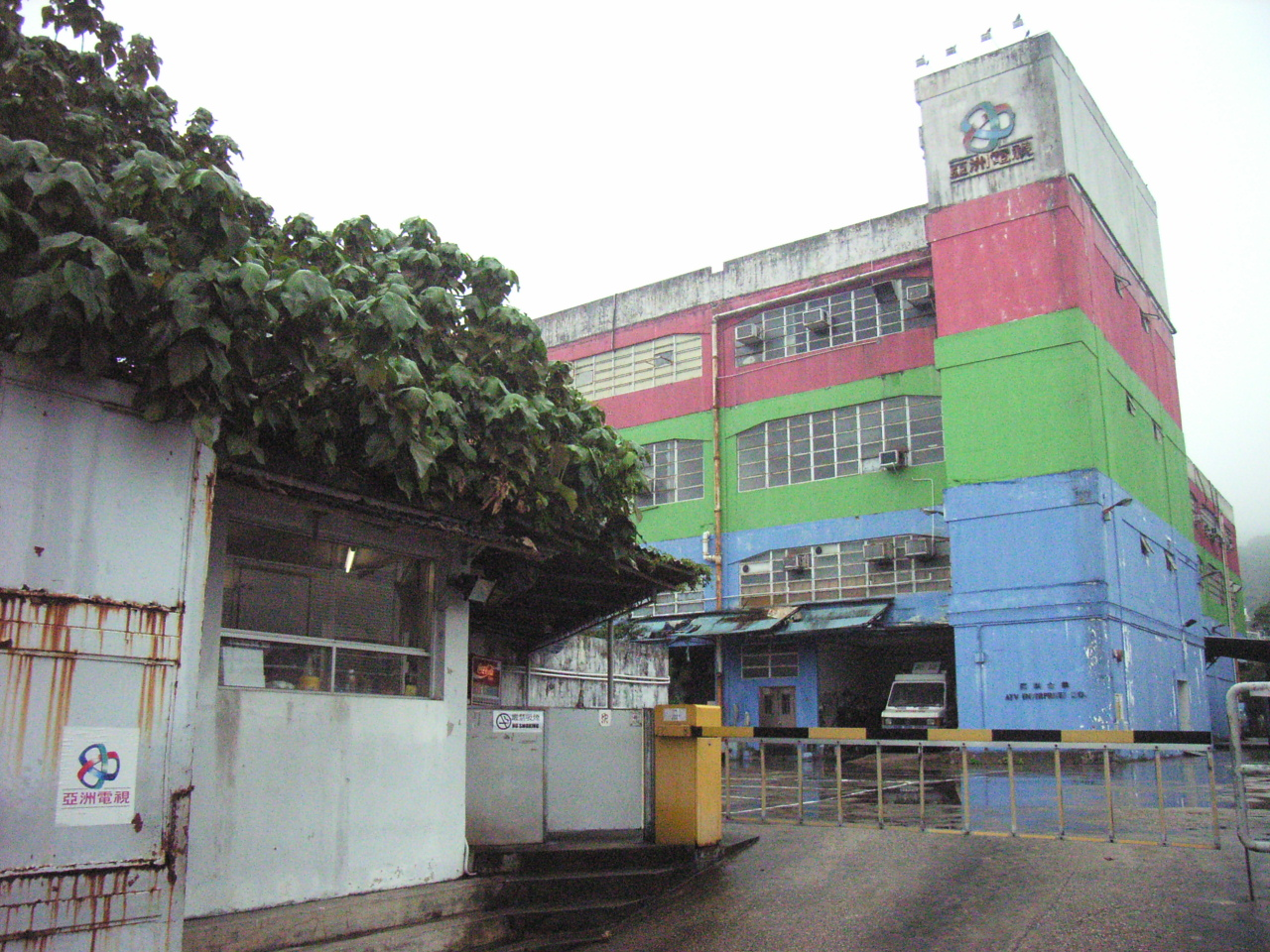
Former ATV studio building in Ho Chung, Sai Kung District

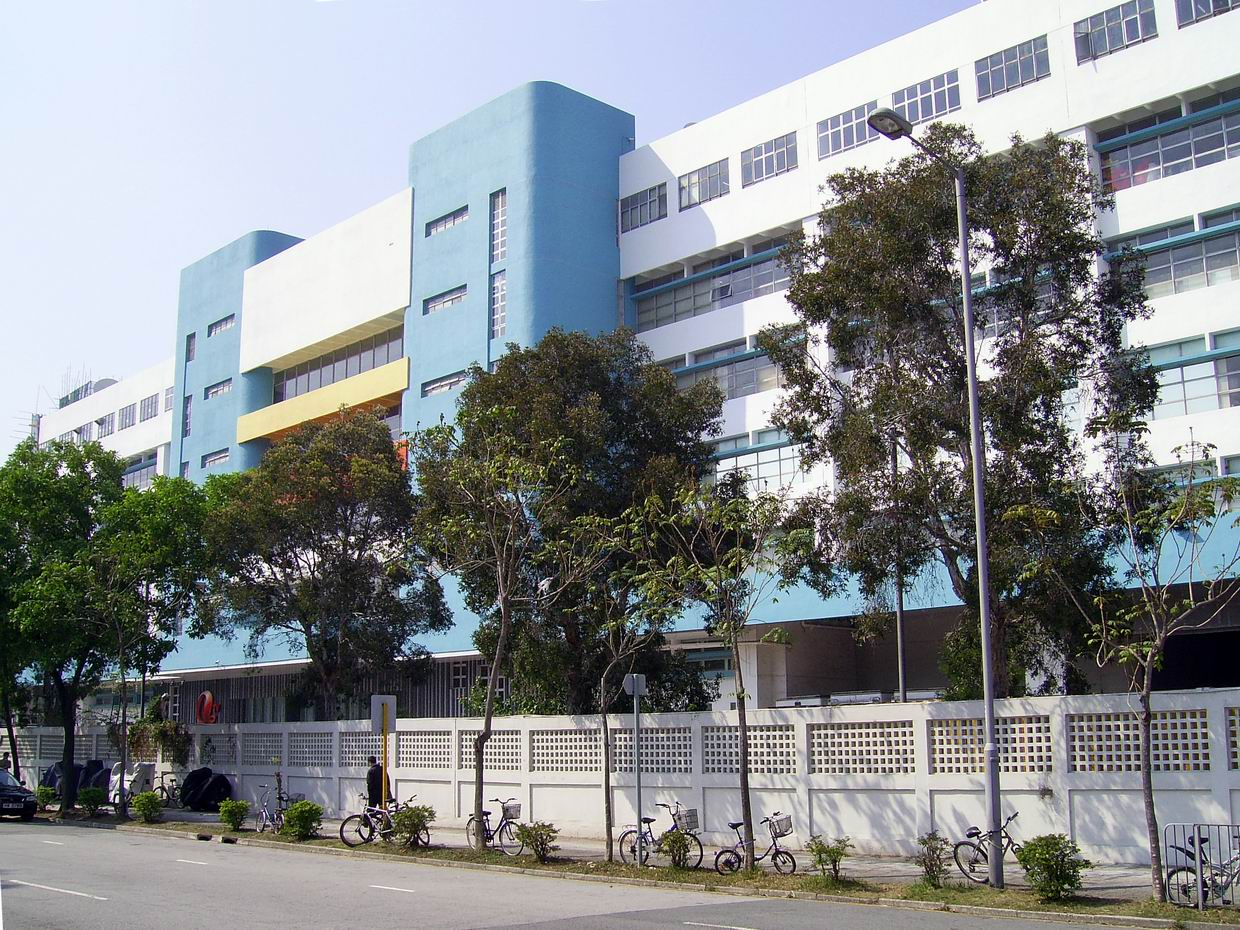
ATV headquarters in Tai Po Industrial Estate, Tai Po District

== News operation ==
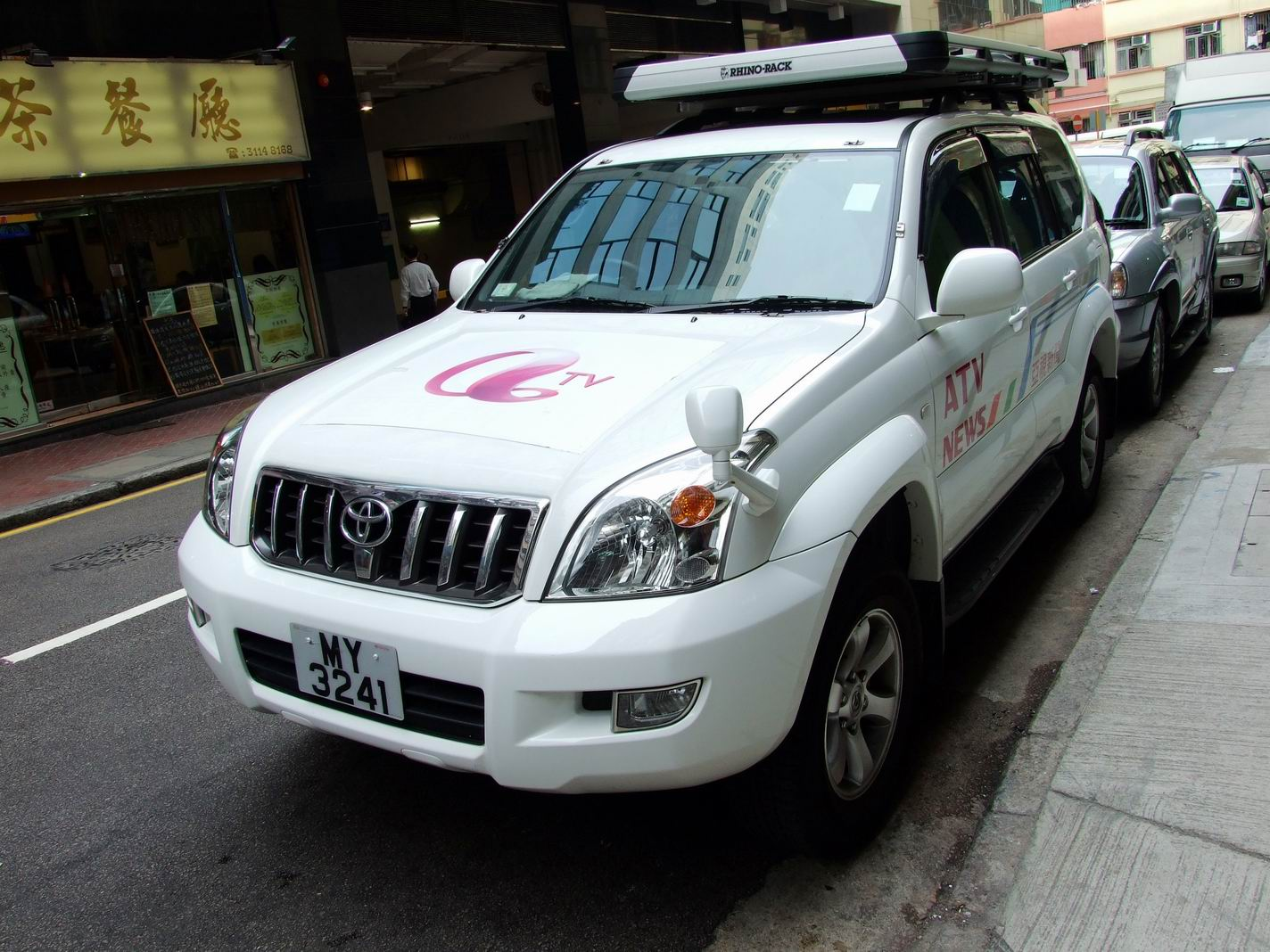
ATV News vehicle

ATV News was the news arm of ATV. It produced daily newscasts in Cantonese, Mandarin, and English, which were seen on its Home, World, and News & Business Channels. Additional foreign news coverage was provided by CNN and CBS. The broadcaster was long recognised as pro-Beijing.

== Programming ==
ATV aired a range of television programmes, including news, infotainment, drama, and variety shows. In addition to producing its shows, ATV acquired popular TV programmes from overseas markets to cater to changing audience tastes. Of note, ATV bought popular TV dramas from South Korea and Mainland China for broadcast in prime time.

=== Channels ===
Before 2 April 2016, ATV operated six channels: the 24-hour ATV Home channel in Cantonese; the 24-hour ATV World channel in English; the 24-hour Cantonese satellite channel ATV Overseas, which was accessible in North America via satellite; and three digital DMB-T/H channels: ATV Asia, a 24-hour high-definition channel; CCTV-1, the general channel of China Central Television.

Before 1 April 2009, the following DMB-T/H channels were in operation: News & Business, a 24-hour news and finance news channel; His TV, a 24-hour sports and infotainment channel aimed at men; Her TV, a 24-hour lifestyle infotainment channel aimed at women; Plus TV, a 24-hour documentary channel; and HDTV, a 24-hour high-definition channel.

| Area Served | 29 May 1957 | 30 Sept. 1963 | 4 Jan. 2002 | 31 Dec. 2007 | 1 Apr. 2009 | 1 Oct. 2009 | 1 Dec. 2010 | 1 Mar. 2011 | 1 Apr. 2011 | 1 Oct. 2012 | 31 Dec. 2012 | 2 April 2016 |
| Local (Hong Kong) | Rediffusion Television | RTV Chinese → RTV1 in 1967 → aTV Chinese in 1982 → aTV Gold in 1987 → aTV Home since 1989 (later renamed to aTV1 prior to April 2009 following the launch of the digital TV on channel 11 by December 2007). | | | | | | | | | | All channels ceased broadcasting on terrestrial platforms upon the expiring of ATV's license, switching instead to OTT broadcasting between 18 December 2017 and 29 January 2018. Its analogue spectrum was taken over by RTHK and its digital spectrum was partially taken over by ViuTV. |
| Local (Hong Kong) | Rediffusion Television | RTV English → RTV2 in 1967 → aTV English in 1982 → aTV Diamond in 1987 → aTV World since 1989 (later renamed to aTV6 prior to April 2009 following the launch of digital TV on channel 16 by December 2007). | | | | | | | | | | All channels ceased broadcasting on terrestrial platforms upon the expiring of ATV's license, switching instead to OTT broadcasting between 18 December 2017 and 29 January 2018. Its analogue spectrum was taken over by RTHK and its digital spectrum was partially taken over by ViuTV. |
| Local (Hong Kong) | N/A | | | aTV2 (Note: aTV2 News & Business Channel) (Digital channel 12) | HD aTV (Digital channel 12), renamed to ATV Asia on 2 May 2011. | | | | | | | All channels ceased broadcasting on terrestrial platforms upon the expiring of ATV's license, switching instead to OTT broadcasting between 18 December 2017 and 29 January 2018. Its analogue spectrum was taken over by RTHK and its digital spectrum was partially taken over by ViuTV. |
| Local (Hong Kong) | N/A | | | aTV9 HDTV (Digital channel 19) | HD aTV (Digital channel 12), renamed to ATV Asia on 2 May 2011. | | | | | | | All channels ceased broadcasting on terrestrial platforms upon the expiring of ATV's license, switching instead to OTT broadcasting between 18 December 2017 and 29 January 2018. Its analogue spectrum was taken over by RTHK and its digital spectrum was partially taken over by ViuTV. |
| Local (Hong Kong) | N/A | | | aTV3 His TV (Digital channel 13) | Vacant | TVS2* (Digital channel 13) | | | | Vacant | aTV Classic (Digital channel 13) | All channels ceased broadcasting on terrestrial platforms upon the expiring of ATV's license, switching instead to OTT broadcasting between 18 December 2017 and 29 January 2018. Its analogue spectrum was taken over by RTHK and its digital spectrum was partially taken over by ViuTV. |
| Local (Hong Kong) | N/A | | | aTV4 Her TV (Digital channel 14) | CTi Asia (Digital channel 14) | | | | Vacant | | aTV Classic (Digital channel 13) | All channels ceased broadcasting on terrestrial platforms upon the expiring of ATV's license, switching instead to OTT broadcasting between 18 December 2017 and 29 January 2018. Its analogue spectrum was taken over by RTHK and its digital spectrum was partially taken over by ViuTV. |
| Local (Hong Kong) | N/A | | | aTV5 Plus TV (Digital channel 15) | CCTV4 (Digital channel 15) | | | CCTV1 (Digital channel 15) | | | | All channels ceased broadcasting on terrestrial platforms upon the expiring of ATV's license, switching instead to OTT broadcasting between 18 December 2017 and 29 January 2018. Its analogue spectrum was taken over by RTHK and its digital spectrum was partially taken over by ViuTV. |
| Local (Hong Kong) | N/A | | | CCTV4 (Digital channel 17) | Vacant | | SZTV (Digital channel 17) | | | | | All channels ceased broadcasting on terrestrial platforms upon the expiring of ATV's license, switching instead to OTT broadcasting between 18 December 2017 and 29 January 2018. Its analogue spectrum was taken over by RTHK and its digital spectrum was partially taken over by ViuTV. |
| Americas | N/A | | aTV Home (America), renamed to aTV Overseas on 20 January 2016. | | | | | | | | | Ceased broadcasting at 1:00 p.m. on 1 April 2016, followed by Rogers Cable channel 809 on 2 May 2016. |

=== Programmes on ATV Home ===
ATV produced numerous classic TV dramas, including Super Stuntman (獅王之王), Crocodile Tears (鱷魚淚), My Date with a Vampire, Fatherland (大地恩情), Vampire Hero (殭屍英雄), The Legend, My Date with a Vampire 2, The Legendary Fok, My Date with a Vampire 3, Central Affairs I and II (情陷夜中環), Vampire Expert II and Reincarnated. Productions of note in the 1990s include The Pride of Chaozhou, Who is the Winner? (勝者為王), Who is the Winner?! 2: King of Green Bat, King of the Gambler (千王之王重出江湖), and The Good Old Days.

In the 2000s, ATV created and hosted certain large-scale award shows. The most well-known would probably be The Annual Most Popular TV Commercial Awards (十大電視廣告頒獎禮).

Other infotainment programmes like Stories From Afar (尋找他鄉的故事) ranked highly in the Appreciation Index Survey Best Television Awards (香港電視節目欣賞指數), as reflected by a public review.

Some ATV programmes, such as the entertainment news show Hong Kong Today (今日睇真D) and Who Wants to Be a Millionaire?, proved particularly popular, prompting local rival TVB to offer similar fare.

Asia Television used to air the British science fiction programme Doctor Who and was responsible for returning one of their copies to the BBC when BBC Enterprises wiped many Doctor Who serials in the 1970s. The Tomb of the Cybermen returned in late 1991.

=== Programmes on ATV World ===
ATV World was one of two English-language channels that broadcast in Hong Kong. It offered a variety of programmes, mostly from the United States, ranging from popular serial dramas and films to documentaries and educational shows. Among the shows it aired are Ally McBeal, Survivor, Smallville, CSI: Crime Scene Investigation, Elizabeth I, CSI: Miami, Cold Case, CSI: NY, Grey's Anatomy, The Closer, Doctor Who, and Ghost Whisperer. ATV stopped carrying the talk show Late Show with David Letterman as of 1 January 2009, but there was a grass-roots movement to bring it back. Arts and sports programming were also offered (e.g., local horse racing, Chinese: 賽馬直擊). Mandarin and Korean programmes were available on ATV World at off-peak hours.

ATV World's flagship English news programme was Main News and Weather Report at 7:30, provided under the collective effort of ATV News.

Given its focus on English-language programming in a predominantly Cantonese-speaking market, ATV World carried relatively little advertising and was subsidised by ATV Home. Free-to-air television companies in Hong Kong are required to provide an English-language service. In the face of competition from TVB Pearl, ATV World switched focus from dramas and movies to documentaries and natural history shows, likely because such programming was less expensive to acquire. Although movies formerly aired on Saturdays, movies acquired by ATV were generally aired on Monday nights, leading to The Late News programme.

== Artistes ==
=== ATV Training Institute ===
Asia Television Training Institute was founded to train people who are interested in joining the television industry. There are four faculties, including television production, television artwork, television talent and technical production. Some of the graduates are offered work at ATV.

=== Actor station-hopping ===
Like TVB, ATV used a contract artist system, in which the station acted as both employer and booking agent. Artists were signed to contracts which meant that they could only appear in that station's programmes; the artists were kept on a basic wage with additional fees paid on a per-episode or per-appearance basis. Acting as an artiste's booking agent, the station would also have a veto in what personal appearances, endorsements, and advertisements an artiste may take, demanding a cut of all fees. Artistes would also be pushed to take jobs favoured by the station, with artistes who rebelled and refused being put "on ice" (被雪 or 雪藏), or being forced to see out their contract at the basic wage but not being used in any of the station's programmes and forbidden from any other work. Being put "on ice" effectively ends an artist's career until the contract lapses.

TVB is known to typecast their performers, with some always given lead roles and others always given supporting roles. As such, some actors left TVB for ATV in hopes of better opportunities, although in most cases, the change of station could mean a drastic reduction in fame for the artist, as TVB is the dominant station in Hong Kong. The majority of the leading roles were given to veteran TVB actors. While some veteran TVB actors merely switched sides because their contracts ended, some joined because they were offered better compensation and positions than veteran TVB actors. There were several known incidents where TVB had certain dramas planned and was forced to cancel or rewrite scripts because the star(s) of the role left for other opportunities and vice versa. While TVB also acquired ATV actors, the cross-over was higher in frequency with TVB actors to ATV.

With the disbandment of ATV's in-house drama department and the station's retreat from making its dramas, there was no longer any work for its actors, and most have since found alternative employment.

=== Past ATV personalities ===
- Alice Chan – now at TVB
- Astrid Chan – 1999–2004; returned to TVB
- Kenneth Chan – formerly TVB, now working for Cable TV
- Ruco Chan – now at TVB
- Joyce Chen – formerly TVB, now a disc jockey
- Saladin Chen 1991–1998
- Leslie Cheung – formerly from RTV, 1977–1982; former TVB artist, 1982–1985; deceased
- Valerie Chow – formerly of TVB – no longer an actress
- Giovanni Chu
- Fang Fong – 1998–1999
- Eddy Ko 1990–2000; has returned to TVB
- Elena Kong – now at TVB
- Wayne Lai – 2000; returned to TVB
- Gilbert Lam - returned and now at TVB
- Thomas Lam
- Damian Lau 1981–1987, now freelance
- Hawick Lau – former TVB artist; 1-year contract at ATV in 2006; now freelance
- Patricia Liu – formerly from TVB, no longer acting and lives in the US
- Gallen Lo – 1983–1984; now at TVB
- Annie Man – 1993–1999; now freelance
- Joey Meng – now at TVB
- Felius Pang – no longer acting
- Lydia Sum 1990s; returned to TVB; deceased
- Van Der Slogan 1988–1999; retired
- Sheren Tang 1995–1996; has returned to TVB
- Michael Tao – 1999–2004; has returned to TVB
- Kristal Tin – now at TVB
- Raymond Wong Ho-yin – now at TVB
- Quener Wu – 1984–1988, retired
- Michelle Ye 2005–?; now freelance
- Claire Yiu 1998–2001; now at TVB

== Criticism and controversies ==
=== Hitler advertisement ===
In 1994, ATV controversially ran a two-page advertisement in the South China Morning Post promoting marketing opportunities, featuring a full-page picture of Adolf Hitler surrounded by members of the Hitler Youth. It suggested that, had Hitler been able to advertise on ATV, he would have "been assured of total domination" and have "had them sieg heiling from Shanghai to Guangzhou" before adding that advertisers should contact the station or their advertising agency "before you come up with your final solution".

This was condemned as "extremely tasteless" by the German Consul-General, who added that the advertisement "hurts the feelings of the many victims of totalitarianism and fascism", and as "outrageous and unbelievable" by his Israeli counterpart. The United Jewish Congregation of Hong Kong also condemned it as "disgusting", claiming that it "carries the newspaper to the very brink of moral bankruptcy" and was "an insult to the memories of all of Hitler's victims".

=== Pro-Beijing slant ===
News programmes broadcast by ATV were deemed by some observers to have taken on a pro-Beijing bias, reporting news involving pro-democracy political forces in Hong Kong in a negative light. A short talk show on current affairs that aired after the six o'clock news frequently invited pro-Beijing advocates to air their views, often praising the PRC's policies and criticising pro-democratic parties, especially when these parties invoked a demonstration. There were also other pro-democratic guests, but this did not balance out the pro-Beijing bias. TVB's news programming is similarly criticised for its "pro-establishment" stance. Although the Hong Kong media has the freedom of speech, self-censorship is commonly practised at media organisations whose owners have business interests in mainland China. A shift in ownership of ATV in mid-2006 sparked concern that ATV would become even more pro-Beijing.

For example, the pro-democracy 1 July marches usually make the headline news on TVB, but ATV usually makes the pro-Beijing counter-protests the headline news. ATV also attempted to dilute the pro-democracy message of the marches by saying the participants had different messages.

In September 2012, there was outrage after ATV broadcast a news article claiming that opponents of Hong Kong's pro-CCP "National Education" classes for students were "destructive forces" which were backed by London and Washington and sought to "destroy Hong Kong by all possible means". Members of the student advocacy group Scholarism were labelled as "naive teenagers" who have allowed themselves to be "exploited by politicians" and are ruining their own futures by "playing with politics".

== See also ==
- Media of Hong Kong
- Television in Hong Kong
- List of television stations in Hong Kong
