= ViuTV6 =

Television channel in Hong Kong

- Logo of ViuTV6
- Country: China
- Broadcast area: Hong Kong; Macau

Programming
- Languages: English; Chinese (in SAP or selected programming)
- Picture format: 1080i HDTV

Ownership
- Owner: HK Television Entertainment (PCCW)
- Sister channels: ViuTV

History
- Launched: 31 March 2017; 9 years ago

Links
- Website: viu.tv

Availability

Terrestrial
- Digital TV (Hong Kong): Channel 96 (HD)
- Digital TV (Macau): Channel 96/98/900 (HD) (Channel number may vary)

ViuTV6 is a free-to-air English language general entertainment television channel in Hong Kong operated by HK Television Entertainment (HKTVE), whose parent company, PCCW, also operates IPTV platform Now TV and media streaming service Viu. The channel offers 17 hours of English programming a day including news and public affairs, lifestyle shows, foreign television series, and documentaries.

Unlike HKTVE's main channel ViuTV, its online streaming feed is not available daily because of copyright issues. The feed is only available for limited times such as when there are live music and sports events.

== History ==
=== Pre-launch ===
In 2015, HKTVE was awarded a 12-year free-to-air television broadcast licence by the Hong Kong Government. Under the regulation of the licence, the company must have an English-speaking channel with 16-hour of programming by 31 March 2017. Until the launch, the channel was originally planned to have 17 hours of programming a day under the format of SDTV.

On 11 October 2016, The channel name ViuTV6 was revealed with a launch date of 31 March 2017 on their 2017 programme preview ViuTV 2017.

== Programming ==
ViuTV6 is a general entertainment channel airing 17 hours of a wide variety of programmes from 9 a.m. to 2 a.m. It airs news, imported television series, factual television and documentary (some programs were bought from ITV Studios, Fremantle, Sony Pictures Television, Banijay Entertainment, Warner Bros. Television Studios, CBS Studios, Paramount Television Studios, Universal Television, ABS-CBN Studios, GMA Network, TV5 Entertainment, Mediacorp and other production units). It also airs some live sports and music events, such as Hong Kong Sevens and BBC Music Awards.

=== Children's programming ===
It has imported cartoons mostly from Warner Bros. Animation, Nickelodeon, Universal Kids, DreamWorks Animation, Nelvana, Entertainment One, FremantleMedia Kids and Family (now Boat Rocker Media) and Allspark (now Hasbro Entertainment) with additional shows from non-English speaking countries or online streaming platforms such as Lost in Oz, and The Fixies.

=== News, politics and finance ===
From launch to 2020, any news bulletin on ViuTV6 was not produced by Now TV's news division. Instead, its main newscast ViuTV News and talk show Weekly Re-Viu were produced Reuters. As of 2020, ViuTV News and Weekly Re-Viu are produced by its own news division as the decline of its cooperation with Reuters.

ViuTV6 also relays live newscast from the international news broadcasters around the world, such as Al Jazeera, CNN (until 2020), ANC (since 2020), Deutsche Welle, and NHK World, with ABC's news magazine 20/20.

From 2019 to 2020, 24K Finance, the only Mandarin Chinese-speaking live financial programme, was produced and aired during Hong Kong Stock Trading Days.

== See also ==
- ViuTV
- List of television stations in Hong Kong
