= I-CABLE HOY =

Hong Kong television broadcaster

i-CABLE HOY Limited 有線寬頻開電視有限公司
- Native name: 有線寬頻開電視有限公司
- Formerly: Fantastic Television Limited
- Type: Subsidiary
- Industry: Television broadcasting
- Founded: 2009; 17 years ago
- Headquarters: Hong Kong
- Parent: CTF Media and Entertainment
- Website: www.hoy.tv

i-CABLE HOY Limited (Chinese: 有線寬頻開電視有限公司), also known simply as HOY and formerly known as Fantastic Television Limited (Chinese: 奇妙電視有限公司), is a commercial free-to-air television broadcasting company in Hong Kong owned by CTF Media and Entertainment, which previously owned and operated Hong Kong Cable Television (Cable TV).

Established in 2009, the company's broadcast licence was granted by the Hong Kong Government on 31 May 2016. The company operates three channels: Cantonese HOY 77 since 14 May 2017, English HOY 76 since 30 July 2018, and Cantonese HOY 78 since 21 November 2022.

Prior to 1 April 2022, HOY TV's channels were broadcast through Cable TV's network, and not available on free-to-air terrestrial television.

== Channels ==
- HOY 77 (channel 77): Formerly named Fantastic TV Chinese Channel, Hong Kong Open TV (Chinese: 香港開電視), and HOY TV.
- HOY 76 (channel 76): The channel was tentatively named Fantastic TV English Channel, but after Forever Top's acquisition of Fantastic Television's parent company I-Cable Communications in 2017, it was later announced in early June 2018 that the channel would be launched as an English and Putonghua business channel named Hong Kong International Business Channel (Chinese: 香港國際財經台) or HKIBC. Later, on October 31, 2023, it was renamed as HOY International Business Channel (Chinese: HOY國際財經台), and on May 11, 2026, it was renamed as HOY 76. The channel simulcasts Bloomberg Television for most of the day, but also relays CGTN in the mornings from 7 am to 9 am. The channel produces English language news bulletins which are aired in the evenings, and also airs non-business and obligatory programmes as mandated in the licence.
- HOY 78 (channel 78): Formerly named HOY Infotainment (Chinese: HOY資訊台) launched on 21 November 2022.
