= Rediffusion Television =

First television station in Hong Kong

Rediffusion Television RTV 麗的呼聲
- Type: Subsidiary
- Country: British Hong Kong
- First air date: 22 March 1949 (radio); 29 May 1957 (television)
- TV transmitters: British Hong Kong
- Headquarters: Broadcast Drive, British Hong Kong
- Broadcast area: British Hong Kong
- Owner: BET, Broadcast Relay Services
- Dissolved: 24 September 1982; 43 years ago
- Language: English; Cantonese
- Replaced by: Asia Television

Rediffusion Television
- Traditional Chinese: 麗的電視有限公司
- Simplified Chinese: 丽的电视有限公司
Transcriptions
Standard Mandarin
- Hanyu Pinyin: Lì de diànshì yǒuxiàn gōngsī
Yue: Cantonese
- Yale Romanization: Laih dīk dihn sih yáuh haahn gūng sī
- Jyutping: Lai6 dik1 din6 si6 jau5 haan6 gung1 si1

Rediffusion Television (Chinese: 麗的呼聲, RTV) is a defunct television station in Hong Kong. It was the city's first broadcaster and the first in any British colony or majority-Chinese city. It began as a radio station in 1949 and became Asia Television on 24 September 1982.

== History ==
Radio Rediffusion was officially founded in 1949 as a wired radio station run by the Rediffusion company. The radio service was highly successful against its main competitor, Commercial Radio. Some of the early content included plays, stories, concerts and Cantonese operas. The broadcasts were one of the main attractions in Hong Kong tea shops. One of the most famous broadcasters was Li Ngaw: another was Uncle Ray, the pioneering DJ.

It later became a subscription cable television station on 29 May 1957, becoming the first television station in a colony of the British Empire, as well as the first television station in a predominantly Chinese city. It initially offered a four-hour-per-day English-language and Chinese-language service. The installation fee during its launch was HK$25, with an equipment rental fee of $45, and a monthly subscription charge of $36.

The charge was considered expensive, at a time when the average worker in Hong Kong earned HK$100 per month. Hong Kong tea shops again provided an outlet for the broadcasts to the working class who could not afford the subscription fees.

By 1962, 150,000 viewers were Rediffusion Television subscribers. The figure for households was 110,000 as of 1971. The cable system was selected in order not to be received in mainland China.

When competitor TVB made its first free-to-air broadcast on 19 November 1967, RTV had 67,000 subscribers. It was renamed Rediffusion Television Limited (RTV; 麗的電視有限公司) on 1 June 1973 when it was granted its free-to-air terrestrial broadcasting license. Cable television broadcasts were ceased thereafter. On 24 September 1982 it was renamed as Asia Television (ATV; 亞洲電視).

== See also ==
- Television in Hong Kong
- Commercial Radio Hong Kong
