= On the Road (disambiguation) =

On the Road is a 1957 novel by Jack Kerouac.

On the Road may also refer to:

== Film ==
- On the Road (1936 film), a French comedy film directed by Jean Boyer
- On the Road (2012 film), a film adaptation of Kerouac's novel
- On the Road (2025 Mexican film), a Mexican thriller drama film directed by David Pablos
- On the Road (2025 Indian film), a Telugu-language road thriller film
- On the Road: A Document (1964), a documentary by Noriaki Tsuchimoto

== Literature ==
- "On the Road" (1886), a short story by Anton Chekhov
- On the Road, a book by the NASCAR driver Jimmie Johnson and his wife Chandra

== Music ==
=== Albums ===
- On the Road (Art Farmer album), 1976
- On the Road (Count Basie album), 1980
- On the Road (The Country Gentlemen album), 1963
- On the Road (George Carlin album) or the title track, 1977
- On the Road (Lee Roy Parnell album), or the title song (see below), 1993
- On the Road (Miss Kittin album), 2002
- On the Road (The String Cheese Incident), a series of live recordings
- On the Road (Traffic album), 1973
- On the Road, a series of live albums by Camel, 1992–1997
- On the Road, by Christy Moore, 2017

=== Songs ===
- "On the Road" (Baekhyun song), 2020
- "On the Road" (Bryan Adams song), 2021
- "On the Road" (Dick Damron song), 1976
- "On the Road" (Lee Roy Parnell song), 1993
- "On the Road", by Ateez from Golden Hour: Part.4, 2026
- "On the Road", by Larry Conklin
- "On the Road", by Laylizzy, 2016
- "On the Road", by Post Malone from Hollywood's Bleeding, 2019
- "On the Road", by Shinhwa from The Return, 2012
- "On the Road", by Syd from Always Never Home, 2017
- "On the Road", from the Thumbelina film soundtrack, 1994

== Television ==
=== Series ===
- On the Road (Czech TV series), a documentary travelogue series since 2006
- On the Road (Hong Kong TV series), a 2006–2008 Cantonese-language travel series
- On the Road (Italian TV series), a 2006 series featuring Ludmilla Radchenko
- On the Road (web series), a 2013 Chinese web series released by Youku
- On the Road with Austin & Santino, a 2010 American reality-documentary television series

=== Episodes and news features ===
- "On the Road", an American travelogue feature on CBS News telecasts from 1967 to 1994, reported by Charles Kuralt
- "On the Road", a renewed version of the original segment, reported by Steve Hartman since 2011
- "On the Road", the fifth series (2008) of the British car show Wheeler Dealers

== See also ==
- Off the Road, a 1990 autobiography by Carolyn Cassady
- On the Road Again (disambiguation)
