= Tai Chi Master =

Tai Chi Master may refer to:

- Zhang Sanfeng, the legendary master
- Tai Chi Master (TV series), a 1980 Hong Kong TV series
- Tai Chi Master (film), a 1993 film
