= 41 Cumberland Road =

Former home of Bruce Lee

Coordinates: 22.330552°N 114.176723°E

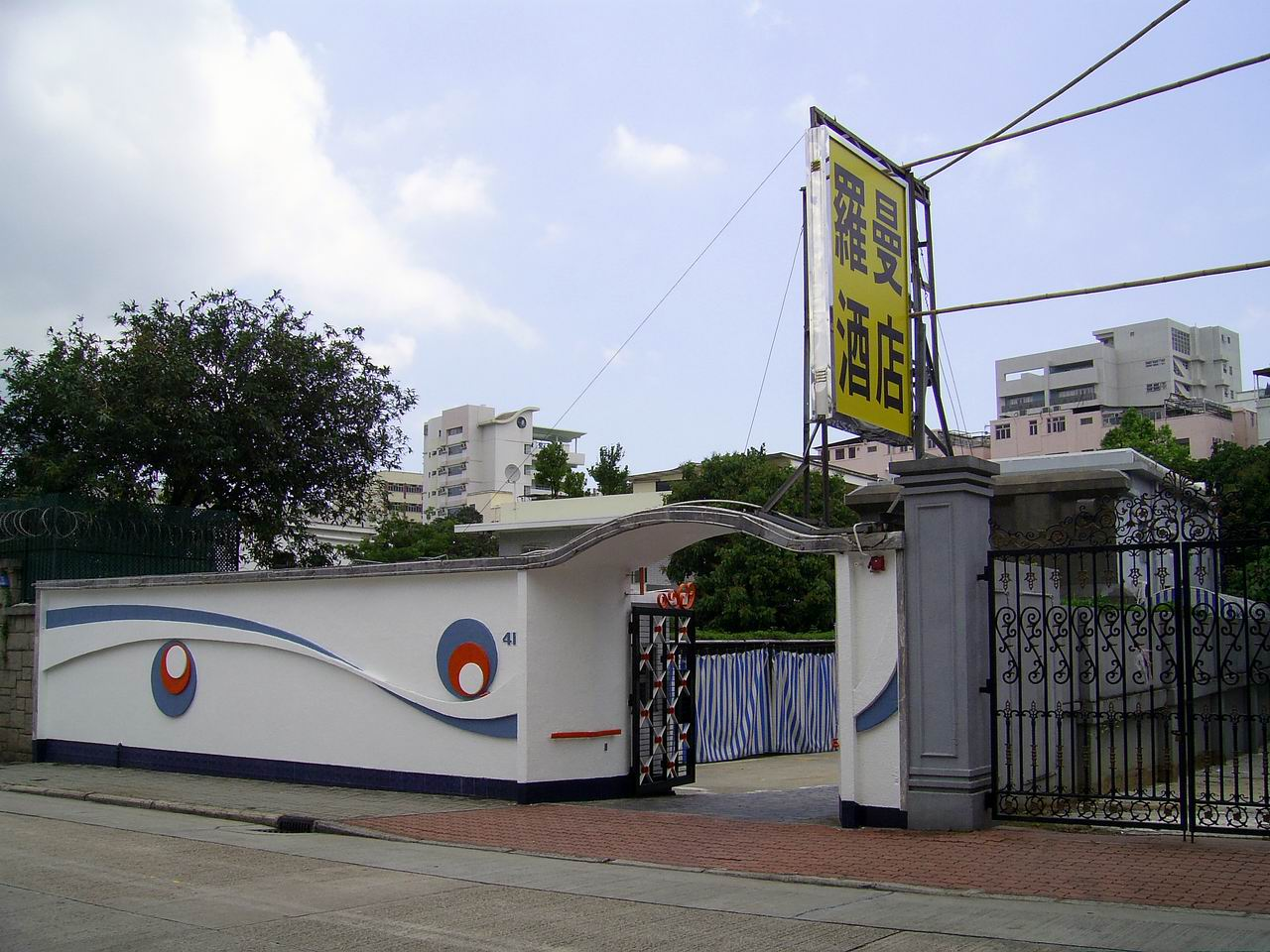
41 Cumberland Road in 2008, operating at that time as a love hotel.

41 Cumberland Road is the address of Bruce Lee's former home in Kowloon Tong, Kowloon, Hong Kong, where he spent his last year with his family. The place was affectionately known as "the Crane's Nest".

It is located in Kowloon City District.

== History ==
Bruce Lee moved into 41 Cumberland Road with his family in June, July or August 1972. He died in Hong Kong on July 20, 1973.

In 1974, mainland Chinese businessman Yu Pang-lin reportedly bought the property from Golden Harvest studio founder Raymond Chow for about HK$1 million. The property was later converted into a love hotel.

On January 6, 2009, it was announced that Lee's Hong Kong home at 41 Cumberland Road would be preserved and transformed into a tourist site by Yu Pang-lin. Yu died in 2015 and this plan did not materialize.

In 2018, Yu's grandson, Pang Chi-ping, said: "We will convert the mansion into a centre for Chinese studies next year, which provides courses like Mandarin and Chinese music for children."

In July 2019, it was announced that the demolition of the building was imminent. Structural problems making the maintenance of the building "unfeasible" were cited, while a mosaic left by Bruce Lee and four window frames were said to be preserved. The house was finally demolished in September that year. A new structure was built in 2021 and today it is a clubhouse.
