= Broadcast Drive =

Street in Kowloon Tong, Hong Kong

Coordinates: 22.34243°N 114.18140°E

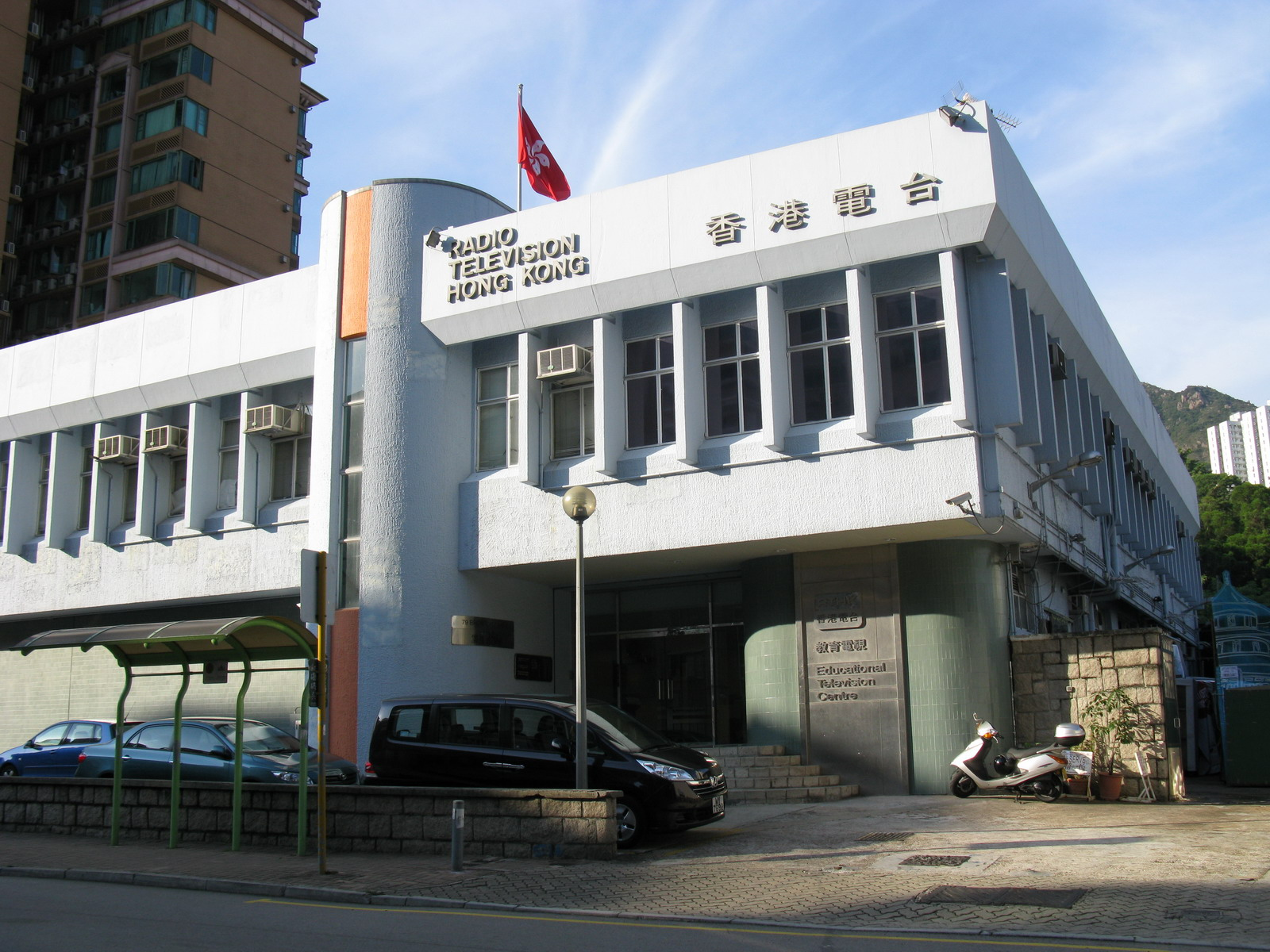
- The Educational Television Centre of the Radio Television Hong Kong on Broadcast Drive
- Traditional Chinese: 廣播道
- Simplified Chinese: 广播道
Transcriptions
Standard Mandarin
- Hanyu Pinyin: Guǎngbō Dào
Yue: Cantonese
- Jyutping: gwong2 bo3 dou6

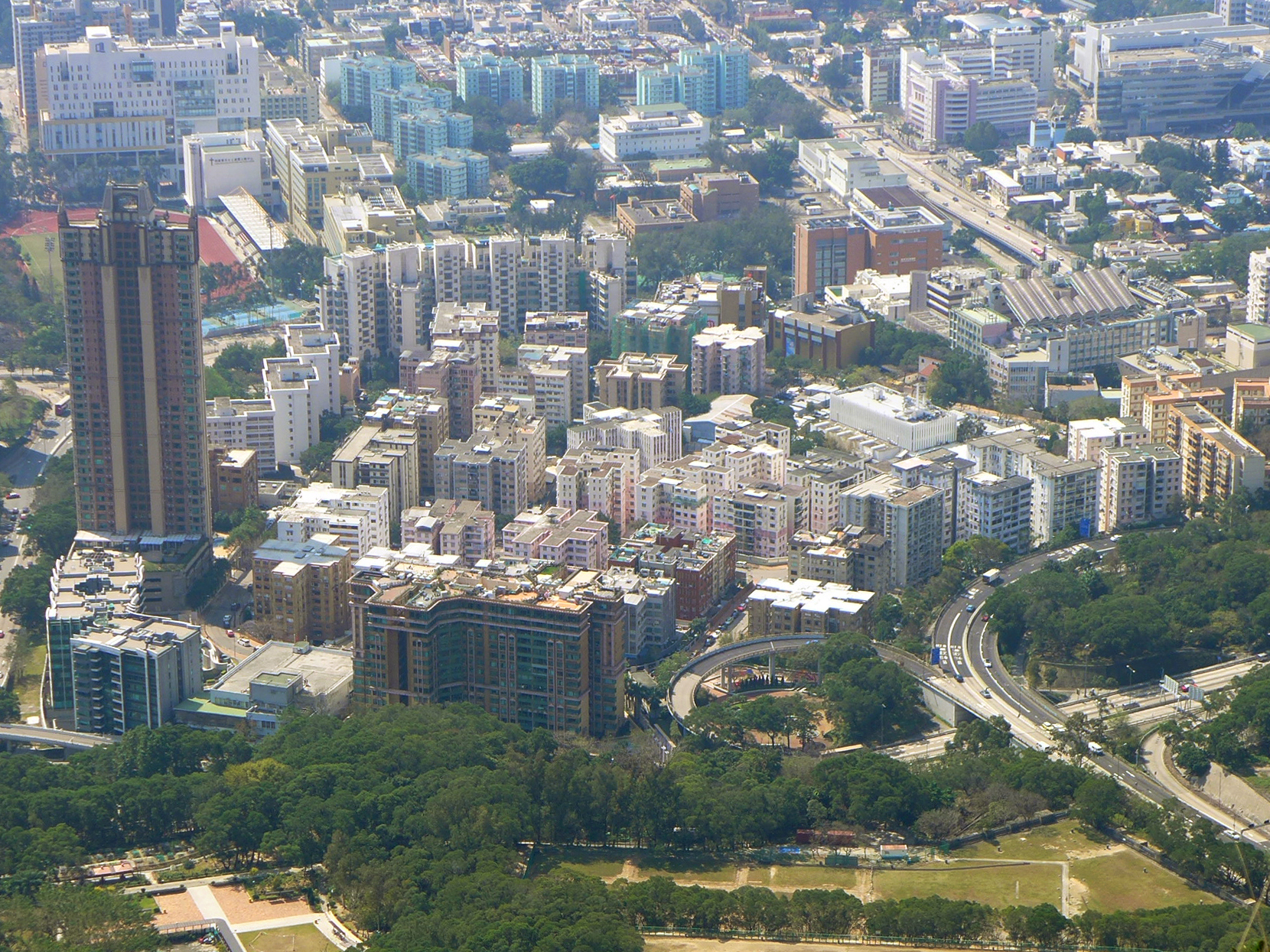
Residence near Broadcast Drive

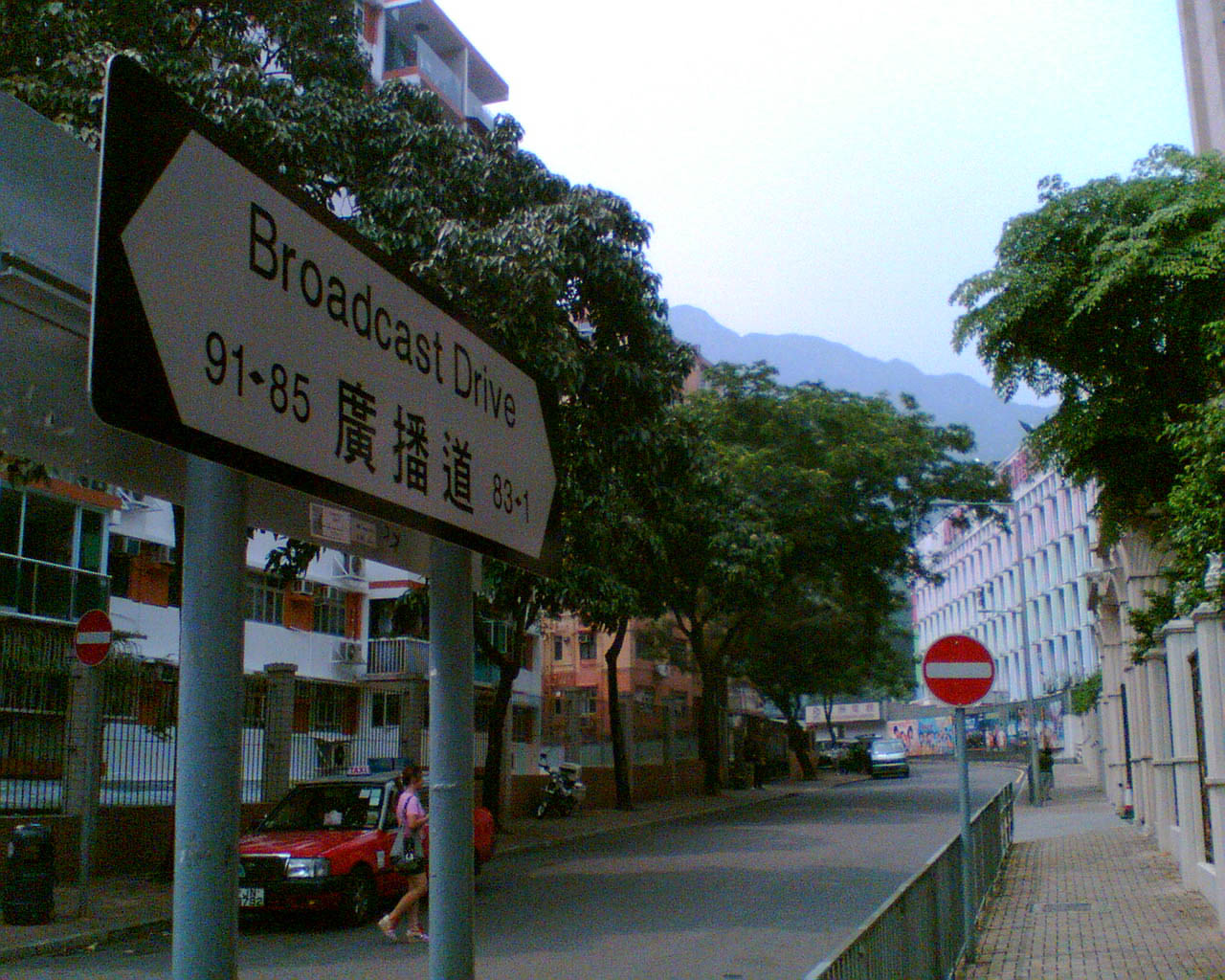
The road sign for Broadcast Drive, with the old ATV building in the background

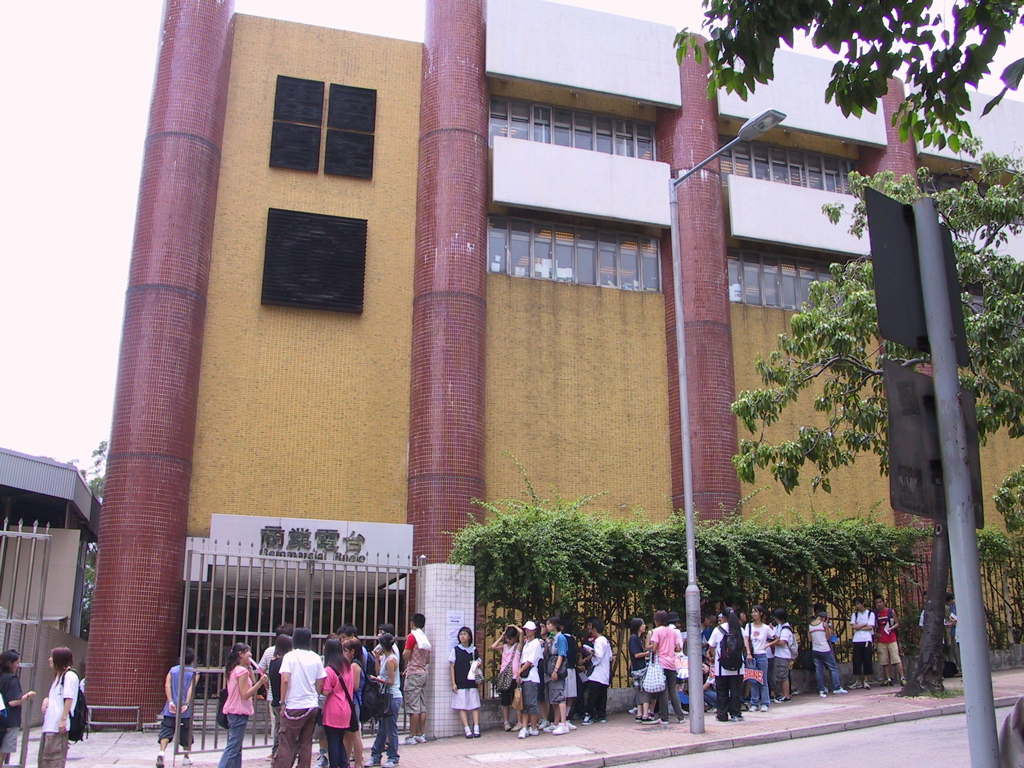
Commercial Radio's building at 3 Broadcast Drive

Broadcast Drive (Chinese: 廣播道; Jyutping: gwong2 bo3 dou6) is a road in Kowloon Tong, Hong Kong. The road is notable as it is only 1 km long but having played host to all five broadcasting outlets in Hong Kong at one point in the 1970s, and the hill on which the road is located was known in Chinese as Ng Toi Shan (五台山, lit. five-station hill) during that time. The five broadcasters were:

- Radio Television Hong Kong (RTHK), whose headquarters (Broadcasting House) was inaugurated in 1969 at 30 Broadcast Drive
- Commercial Radio Hong Kong (CRHK)
- Television Broadcasts Limited (TVB)
- Rediffusion Television (RTV), later renamed Asia Television (ATV); and
- Commercial Television

The area became known as Four-station Hill (四台山) in 1978 following Commercial Television's collapse. Its studio building was acquired by RTHK for its television unit, and was reopened as Television House in 1986.

TVB moved its operations to the Clear Water Bay TV City in 1988, and ATV moved to Tai Po in 2007, leaving RTHK and CRHK the only remaining broadcasters on the road. RTHK has announced plans to move its operations to Tseung Kwan O within the next few years. The reason for the departure of broadcast stations is partly due to the rising value of the land occupied and stations cashing in the rise in value.

The area is also a well known high end (though gradually ageing) residential neighbourhood, and is home to those mainly from professional and upper middle class backgrounds.

== TVB headquarters ==
TVB first headquarters and studios were located at 77 Broadcast Drive in Kowloon Tong and were neighbours with fellow broadcasters RTHK and ATV. The six storey office tower and studios were located along the hills along Broadcast Drive. By the late 1980s, TVB had out-grown the facility at Broadcast Drive, and built a new studio complex, named T.V. City, at 220 Clear Water Bay Road in November 1988. From the late 1970s to 1987, TVB also used the office of the defunct Commercial TV for additional studio space.

The old headquarters were demolished to make way for residential flats. The old Commercial Television Building is now RTHK Television House.

The company's main rival: ATV, moved away from the neighbourhood in 2007.

== Public transportation ==
Broadcast Drive is served by four minibus routes, one KMB bus route and one free shuttle bus route.

- Green Minibus No. 13 (to Hung Hom Ferry Pier)
- Green Minibus No. 13A (to Lok Fu)
- Green Minibus No. 13B (to Lok Fu)
- Green Minibus No. 29A (to Kowloon Tong station)
- KMB No. 208 (to Tsim Sha Tsui East)
- Lok Fu Place - Broadcast Drive Shuttle Bus (to Lok Fu Place)

== Education ==
Broadcast Drive is in Primary One Admission (POA) School Net 41. Within the school net are multiple aided schools (operated independently but funded with government money) and Kowloon Tong Government Primary School.

== See also ==
- List of streets and roads in Hong Kong
