= Kowloon Tong School (Secondary Section) =

Secondary school in Hong Kong

- 10 Surrey Lane; Kowloon Tong, Kowloon; Hong Kong

Information
- Type: Aided Secondary Schools
- Motto: Diligence, Simplicity, Sincerity, Courage
- Established: 1962; 64 years ago
- Principal: Teresa Hon Pui-yee
- Faculty: 58
- Enrollment: 850
- Colour: Blue
- Website: http://www.ktsss.edu.hk

The Kowloon Tong School (Secondary Section) (Chinese: 九龍塘學校(中學部); KTSSS) is a co-educational secondary school in Hong Kong. Located at 10 Surrey Lane in Kowloon Tong, the school was founded in 1962 as private English language school. It was changed to a co-educational aided secondary school in 1978.

The school is not a "through-train" school that links with the Kowloon Tong School (Primary Section).
