= On the Road Again =

On the Road Again may refer to:

== Albums ==
- On the Road Again (D. J. Rogers album), 1976
- On the Road Again (Rockets album), 1978
- On the Road Again (Roy Wood album), 1979
- On the Road Again, a 1989 compilation album by Canned Heat
- On the Road Again, a 2010 album by Katchafire
- Live—On the Road Again 1989, a 1990 album by Bernard Lavilliers

== Songs ==
- "On the Road Again" (Bob Dylan song), 1965
- "On the Road Again" (the Lovin' Spoonful song), 1965
- "On the Road Again" (Canned Heat song), 1968
- "On the Road Again" (Willie Nelson song), 1980
- "On the Road Again", a song by Barrabás from their album Piel de Barrabás, 1981
- "On the Road Again", a song by Aerosmith from Pandora's Box, 1991
- "On the Road Again", a song by Bernard Lavilliers from his album If..., 1988

== Television ==
- On the Road Again (TV series), a 1987–2007 Canadian documentary series
- "On the Road Again?" (Hannah Montana), an episode of Hannah Montana and the third segment of That's So Suite Life of Hannah Montana
- "On the Road Again" (Young Rock)

== Tours ==
- On the Road Again Tour, the 2015 concert tour by English-Irish boy band One Direction

== Public art ==
- On the Road Again bronze by Anne Ross (Australian sculptor)

== See also ==
- Spain... on the Road Again, a 2008 American food and travel series
- On the Road (disambiguation)
- "Turn the Page" (Bob Seger song), that features "on the road again" in the refrain
