= Commercial Television (Hong Kong TV station) =

Television station

Commercial Television 佳藝電視有限公司
- Company type: Private Limited
- Industry: Television
- Founded: 7 September 1975
- Defunct: 19 October 1978 (3 years, 42 days)
- Headquarters: 1A Broadcast Drive, Kowloon, British Hong Kong
- Products: Commercial Television
- Revenue: N/A
- Number of employees: About 1000
- Website: N/A

Commercial Television
- Traditional Chinese: 佳藝電視
Transcriptions
Yue: Cantonese
- Yale Romanization: Gāai ngaih dihn sih
- Jyutping: Gaai1 ngai6 din6 si6

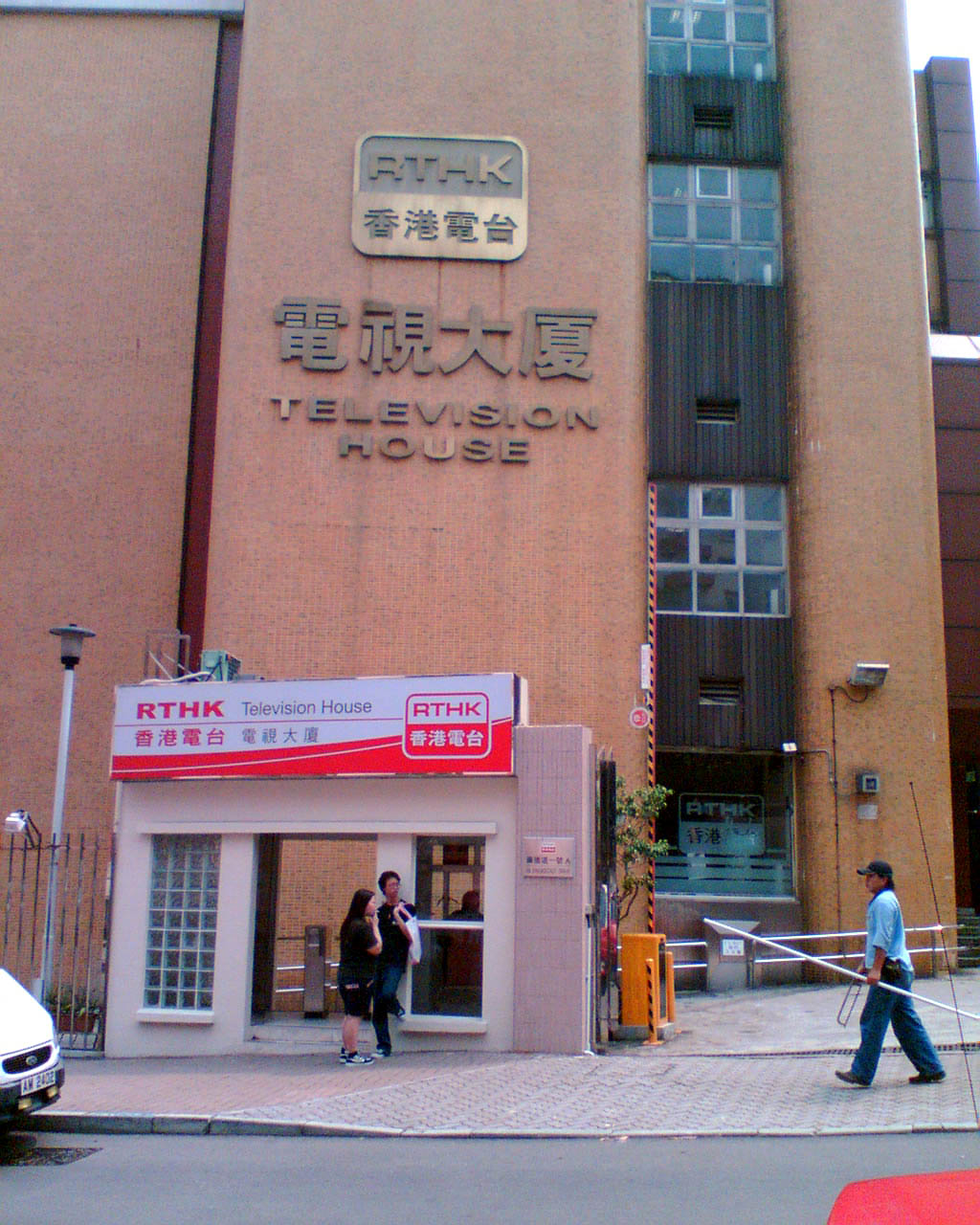
Commercial Television's building from 1975 to 1978; now RTHK's Television House.

Commercial Television (CTV; Chinese: 佳藝電視) was the third free-to-air broadcast television station in Hong Kong. It first went on air in 1975, and ceased transmissions in 1978.

== History ==
On 30 November 1973, the then-British Hong Kong government issued 2 licences for additional terrestrial television broadcasters, ending TVB's six-year monopoly as the sole free-to-air television company in Hong Kong. In which Commercial Television received the A group of shareholders formed a consortium (Commercial Television) to contest the licence; the six major shareholders were Commercial Radio, Jardines, Sing Tao Daily, Wah Kiu Yat Pao, The Kung Sheung Daily News, and the Lam family (one of the founders of Hang Seng Bank).

The licences were awarded on 10 August, with Rediffusion Television receiving licences for two television stations (one broadcasting in Cantonese and the other in English), while Commercial Television only received one licence for a station broadcasting in Cantonese.

The station launched at 6:00 pm on 7 September 1975. Its logo was a hexagon formed from six angled lines, representing the Six Arts (禮樂射御書數) in Confucian philosophy, as well as the six major stakeholders. At the time, the station was reportedly mocked for using the Six Arts as the inspiration for its logo, as 御書數 (Charioteering, Calligraphy and Mathematics) in Cantonese sounds similar to the phrase 預輸數 (predicted/prepared for defeat).

In the same year, Commercial Television launched a region-wide hit, a television-adaption of The Legend of the Condor Heroes (1976 TV series). It featured Michelle Yim, which launched her career and shot her into the limelight.

The headquarters of Commercial Television was situated at 1A Broadcast Drive, Kowloon. (The location currently houses the RTHK Television House)

== Collapse ==
One of the station's licensing conditions was to air two hours of educational programming every weeknight, with no commercial interruptions. Such programming on the station was primarily oriented at adults, covering topics such as auto mechanics, interior design, and foreign languages. The station struggled to break even as a result of this requirement. An attempt was made to resurrect the failing station in July 1976 when Selina Chow, then assistant general manager of TVB was drafted in as its new general manager. A significant amount of money was spent on producing drama series; The number of staff trebled, and the cash-burn rate escalated under Chow.

On 22 August 1978, the station announced it was ending its operations, its 800 staff were laid off and the company was declared bankrupt on 19 October. Following the station's collapse, the government concluded that a third commercial television station "did not appear viable".

== Aftermath ==
For over three decades after Commercial Television's demise, TVB and Rediffusion Television (later Asia Television, now defunct) remained a duopoly of terrestrial TV broadcasters in Hong Kong. ATV's licence was not renewed in 2015, and ceased broadcasting just before midnight on 1 April 2016. ViuTV was issued a television licence in 2015, and started a digital-only terrestrial television operation starting on 2 April 2016, using terrestrial television frequencies formerly used by ATV.

A third television licence was issued on 31 May 2016 to Fantastic Television, but the station was not given over-the-air frequencies to broadcast its content until 1 April 2022.

Much blame flew around about the reasons for the failure. The Government was blamed for restrictive conditions of the licence; the management was blamed for bad programme scheduling and failing to control escalating costs; shareholders were blamed for having the short-term mentality of property developers. However, the Government blamed the collapse on the unwillingness of the shareholders to inject more capital, after it had spent its entire HK$20 million within one year. Many TV series were brought by TVB and ATV and TVB seldom rebroadcast them.

The station's building on Broadcast Drive was briefly used by TVB as a studio building, until it became RTHK's Television House in 1987.
