= Chen Sisi (actress) =

Chinese actress

- 陈思思
- Born: Chen Limei; 28 December 1938; Shanghai, China
- Died: 7 October 2007 (aged 68); Shanghai
- Other names: Sisi Chen
- Occupation: Actor
- Known for: Her portrayal of Qiu Xiang in Three Charming Smiles (San Xiao), a 1964 comedy.

Sisi Chen (simplified Chinese: 陈思思; traditional Chinese: 陳思思; pinyin: Chén Sīsī; December 28, 1938 – October 7, 2007), born Chen Limei (simplified Chinese: 陈丽梅; traditional Chinese: 陳麗梅; pinyin: Chén Lìméi), was a Chinese film and theater actress.

== Biography ==
Born in Shanghai, China, she was best known for her portrayal of Qiu Xiang in Three Charming Smiles (San Xiao), a 1964 comedy.

== Death ==
Sisi Chen was diagnosed with pancreatic cancer in July 2007. She died three months later, on 7 October 2007, aged 69, at Huadong Hospital in her native Shanghai.

== Filmography ==
=== TV series ===
- The Legend of the Condor Heroes (1976)

=== Films ===
- Gold Diggers (黄金万两) (1965) Dog Day Afternoon (1975)
