= Michelle Yim =

Hong Kong television actress

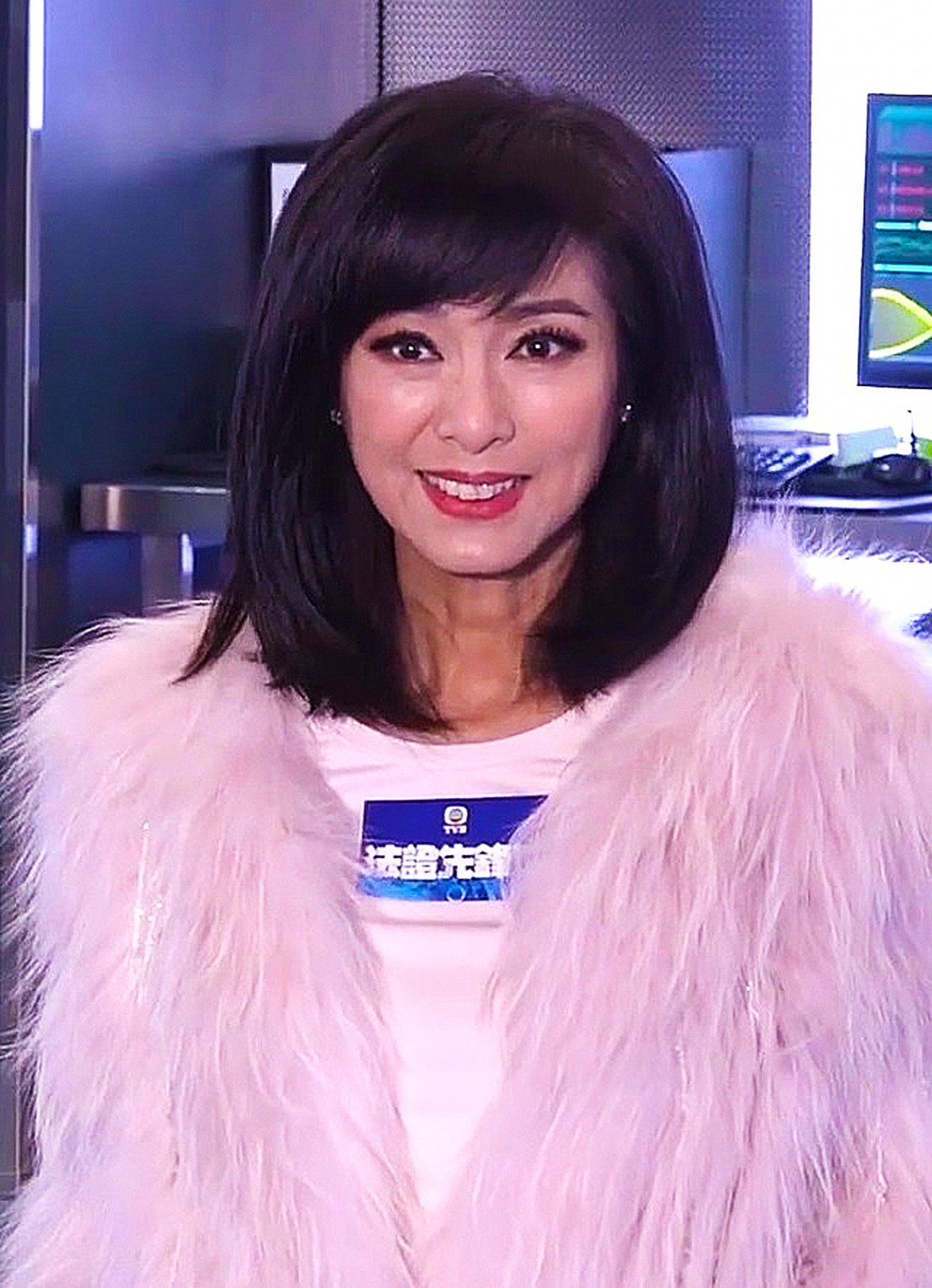
- Yim in 2019
- Born: Yim Wai-ling; 2 September 1955 (age 71); British Hong Kong
- Occupation: Actress
- Years active: 1975–present
- Partner: Wan Chi Keung (1992–2010; his death)
- Relatives: Sidney Yim (sister)
- Awards: TVB Anniversary Awards – Best Actress; 2008 Moonlight Resonance Asian Television Awards – Best Actress - Drama Series; 2009 Moonlight Resonance

Chinese name
- Traditional Chinese: 嚴惠玲
- Simplified Chinese: 严惠玲
- Cantonese Yale: yìhm waih lìhng
Transcriptions
Standard Mandarin
- Hanyu Pinyin: Yán huì líng
Yue: Cantonese
- Yale Romanization: yìhm waih lìhng
- Musical career
- Also known as: Mai Suet (Chinese: 米雪; Jyutping: Mai^{5} Syut^{3}; Cantonese Yale: mái syut; pinyin: Mǐ xuě)

Michelle Yim Wai-ling (Chinese: 嚴惠玲; born September 2, 1955), better known by her stage name Mai Suet (米雪), is a Hong Kong actress and elder sister of former actress Sidney Yim Wai-ming also known by stage name Suet Lei (雪梨). She graduated from St. Rose of Lima's College and Shaw Brothers' Training School.

== Career ==
In 1972, Yim started her acting career. Yim's stage name is known as Mai Suet. Yim first appeared as a Yang female soldier in The 14 Amazons, a 1972 Mandarin drama and martial arts film directed by Cheng Kang.

=== CTV ===
In 1975, Yim joined Commercial Television (CTV), and began her journey onto the television circles. In 1976, Yim acted in Legend of the Condor Heroes, a Wuxia TV series adaptation of Louis Cha's novel of the same title. For the first time, Yim took up the role as a female lead, portraying the character Wong Yung. This drama not only made her famous but also made CTV's first million ratings. She has since been awarded the Top Ten Artistes Award several times.

With the closure of CTV in 1978, Yim became a contract-free actress. One of the companies, Television Broadcasts (TVB) invited her to guest-star in one of the period drama, The Twins.

=== RTV (now ATV) ===
During the 1980s, Yim signed and joined Rediffusion Television (RTV) (now ATV). There, she acted in several well-known drama serials, such as The Dynasty, The Radical City, Tai Chi Master, Princess Cheung Ping, The Legendary Fok and more, earning her the title of the "Princess of Wuxia Drama".

After her contract with RTV terminated, Yim was once again a contract-free actress, and this allowed her to work for the two companies (TVB and ATV) more easily. However, such situation is considered rare due to the intense competition between the two broadcasting companies. Examples like The Legend of Master So and Tiger Hill Trail.

Other than films and television dramas, she has also acted in live performances. In 1982, she was invited by Roman Tam to perform in a musical play called Madame White Snake, portraying the role as the Green Snake. The cast included Roman Tam and Liza Wang.

In 1985, Yim returned to ATV and agreed to film a certain number of drama serials a year as part of her filming contract. At the same year, together with Damian Lau, she filmed a period drama, Chronicles of the Shadow Swordsman, adapted from one of Wuxia writer Liang Yusheng's works, Since then, both were in many drama serials.

In 1990, she performed in another musical play, Cyrano De Bergerac, a story adapted from French literature. Her co-star was Adam Cheng and allowed her to take part more in musicals in the future. Yim signed a contract with TVB in 1993, acting in a 300+ episodes sitcom, Mind Our Own Business. Together with the rest of that cast, she performed in another musical play (The Flirty Doctor). She was involved in a musical play (I Have a Date with Spring) with Alice Lau as well.

=== TVB ===
In 2000, Yim and Damian Lau starred as Cheung Mo-kei's parents in the TVB Wuxia drama, The Heaven Sword and Dragon Saber.

Since 2000, she has been actively involved in several shows, including filming for drama serials, dancing, musical play, game shows, and even cooperated with overseas broadcasts companies. Cash Is King (2002) and The Rainbow Connection (2005) showed good examples. She has also hosted in programmes such as On the Road and Life In Frame (光影流情).

In this TVB's drama serial Moonlight Resonance, aired in July 2008, Yim portrays the villainous second wife, Yan Hung, who plots to have the family separated. Her performance in this serial has won her many praises and recognition. Yim won the Best Actress in the TVB Anniversary Awards 2008. In the final episode of Moonlight Resonance, which has the rating of over 47, the drama reached its peak at 50 rating during the scene when Yan Hung (character portrayed by Yim) slapped her daughter and shouted angrily to everyone present in her house.

On 3 December 2009, Yim won the "Best Drama Performance by an Actress" award at the Asian Television Awards 2009 for her role in Moonlight Resonance.

=== Personal life ===
Yim had been in a long-term relationship with former soccer player and fellow actor Wan Chi-keung, who died on 16 February 2010. Yim was also in-laws with actor Norman Chui between 1983 and 1989 when he was married to her sister Sydney who is also an actress.

== Awards ==
For her popular villain role in 2008's TVB acclaimed drama, Moonlight Resonance, she won "Best Actress" at TVB Anniversary Awards 2008 and also at Asian Television Awards 2009. She is the first Hong Kong television actress to sweep two Best Actress awards from a single role, and also the first Hong Kong actress to win Best Actress at the Asian Television Awards.

== Filmography ==
=== Films ===
Year	Title	Role	Notes/Ref.
1972	Four Riders (四騎士)		
1972	Intimate Confessions of a Chinese Courtesan	Ainu's maid	
1973	Black Guide (黑人物)		
1973	Police Woman (女警察)		
1974	Evidence (鐵証)		
1976	Thousand Miles Escort (劍霜刃)		
1977	Ironside 426 四二六		
1977	The 36 Crazy Fists 三十六迷形拳/笑林三十六房		
1977	The Dream of the Red Chamber 金玉良缘紅樓夢		
1978	Edge of Fury 黑色家變 / 撈家撈女撈上撈		
1978	Ten Tigers of Shaolin 廣東十虎		
1978	Funny Kungfu 密十至尊		
1978	Bruce Lee's Fists of Vengeance 大報復		
1978	Flying Fox of Snowy Mountain 雪山飛狐	Yuen Tze-yi 袁紫衣	
1979	Fist of Fury 3 截拳鷹爪功		
1979	He Who Never Dies 大命小子		
1979	Chilvary of Conspiracy 陸小鳳與西門吹雪		
1979	Kung Fu Vs. Yoga 老鼠拉龜		
1979	Twins of Kungfu 痴鳳傻龍/猛龍福星		
1979	The Butterfly Murders 蝶變		
1979	Crazy Hustlers 懵仔傻妹妙偵探		
1979	Jade Swan 玉鳳		
1979	Read Lips 孖寶闖八關		
1980	The Mortal Storm 風塵		
1980	The Final Duel 決戰 / 密樑		
1980	The Desperate Trio 爛命一條		
1980	The Star, the Rogue, and the Kung Fu Kid 武師,花旦,大流氓		
1980	We're Going to Eat You 地獄無門		
1981	The Mad, Mad, Mad Sailors 大力小水手		
1981	The Ambitious Kungfu Girl 紅粉動江湖		
1981	The Prohibited Area 阿燦有難		
1982	Here Comes The Wolf 狼來了		
1982	First Exposure 龍虎雙霸天 / 鐵膽雙龍		
1984	The Return of Pom Pom 雙龍出海		
1984	And Now, What's Your Name 先生貴姓	Denise	
1984	Dress Off For Life 一脫求生		
2003	Dragon Loaded 2003 龍咁威2003		
2004	Moving Targets; 2004新紮師兄		
2004	When Beckham Met Owen 當碧咸遇上奧雲		
2005	Ab-normal Beauty 死亡寫真		
2005	New Born 天地孩兒		
2007	Naraka 19 地獄第19層		
2008	Playboy Cops 花花型警		
2011	Racer Legend		
2012	I Love Hong Kong 2012		
2015	ATM 提款機		
2016	A Wishing Tree		
2018	Forever Young 無問西東		

=== Television dramas ===
Year	Title	Role	Network	Awards	Notes
1975	Ups and Downs 樓上樓下		CTV		
1976	Saga of Sui & Tang Dynasty 隋唐風雲		CTV		
1976	Legend of the Condor Heroes 射雕英雄傳	Wong Yung	CTV		Female Lead
1976	The Return of the Condor Heroes 神雕俠侶	Wong Yung	CTV		
1976	Heroes From Guangdong 廣東好漢		CTV		
1976	Blindness 雌雄金剛之盲禍		CTV		
1977	Small vs Big 細魚食大魚		CTV		
1977	Side Story of the Pugilistic World 武林外史		CTV		
1977	Yee Pik Wan Tin 義薄雲天		CTV		
1977	Dream of the Red Chamber 紅樓夢		CTV		
1978	Love Affairs 名流情史		CTV		
1978	The Wind and Thunderous Saber 風雷第一刀		CTV		
1979	The Twins 絕代雙驕	So Ying	TVB		Female Lead
1980	On The Waterfront 湖海争霸录		RTV		
1980	The Dynasty 大内群英		RTV		Female Lead
1980	Fatherland (II) - Radical City 大地恩情之古都惊雷		RTV		
1980	Tai Chi Master 太極張三豐	To Choi-yi	RTV		Female Lead
1981	The Coma 大昏迷		RTV		
1981	Princess Cheung Ping 武俠帝女花		RTV		Female Lead
1981	The Legendary Fok 大俠霍元甲	Chiu Sin-nam	RTV		Female Lead
1982	Hong Kong'82 香港82		TVB		
1982	The Legend of Master So 蘇乞兒	Siu Ling	TVB		Female Lead
1983	Tiger Hill Trail 再向虎山行		ATV		Female Lead
1983	Heroes From Zhujiang 珠江群龍		ATV		
1984	The Undercover Agents 四大名捕		ATV		
1984	Below The Lion Rock 獅子山下之落雨擔遮		RTHK		
1984	Miracle of the Orient I 香江歲月1		RTHK		
1985	Chronicles of the Shadow Swordsman 萍蹤俠影錄	Wan Lui 雲蕾	ATV		first Female Lead
1985	Romance of the Maples Leaves 楓葉盟	Chin Wen Fung 秦文鳳	TTV		
1985	The Legendary Prime Minister – Zhuge Liang 諸葛亮	Siu-kiu	ATV		
1985	Chor Lau-heung 楚留香新傳	Su Rongrong / Su Mangmang	CTV		
1986	Rise of the Great Wall 秦始皇	Suet-ying	ATV		
1986	The Royal Sword 金劍神傳				
1986	Lady C.I.D 柔情點三八		ATV		
1987	Laugh In The Sleeves 啼笑姻緣		ATV		
1988	Mai Wan 迷魂		ATV		
1988	The Formidable Lady From Shaolin 少林與詠春	Yim Wing-chun	TVB		
1988	Law and Order 法網柔情		ATV		
1988	Hung Ling 凶靈		ATV		
1988	Storm In October 十月風暴		ATV		
1988	August Scent 八月桂花香		TTV		
1989	Lady Enforcer 皇家儷人		ATV		
1990	Heaven's Retribution 還看今朝	Shum Suet-ying	ATV		
1990	Bloodshed Over the Forbidden City 血染紫禁城	Empress Dowager Cixi	ATV		
1990	Last Song for Killer 殺手輓歌		ATV		
1991	The Good Fella From Temple Street 廟街豪情	Cheung Wai-tak	ATV		
1991	Legend of A Beauty 一代天驕		SBC		
1992	Queen of the Opera 香港傳奇人物之天之嬌女		ATV		
1992	Casanova In China 伯虎为卿狂	Mui Lan-sin	ATV		
1992	AIDS Carrier 性本善之帶菌者		RTHK		
1992	Return To The Truth 還我今生	Lam Suk-han	ATV		
1992	Mythical Crane and Magical Needle 92 仙鶴神針	Lam Chui-dip	ATV		
1993	CYC Family; CYC家族				
1993	Mind Our Own Business 開心華之里	Ching Yu-chu	TVB		
1995	Down Memory Lane 萬里長情	Yuen Sau-lan	TVB		
1995	Justice Pao 包青天之滄海月明珠有淚	Ngok Ming-chu	ATV		
1996	Justice Pao 包青天之忘情酒坊	To Sap-sam	TVB		first Female Lead
1996	King of Gambler 千王之王重出江湖	Sam Siu-chun	ATV		
1996	Miracle of the Orient II 香江歲月II		RTHK		
1997	The Snow is Red 雪花神劍	Nip Mei-neung	ATV		
1998	King Fei Kau Leung Chu Sam Kok 警匪較量珠三角				
2000	Bond of Friendship 人間友情		HVD		first Female Lead
2001	Reaching Out 美麗人生	Chan Kiu	TVB		
2001	The Heaven Sword & The Dragon Sabre	Yan So-so	TVB		Supporting Role
2002	Cash is King 勝券在握	Leung Bing-bing	SPH		
2004	Venture Against Time 子是故人來	Sing Mei-kuen	ATV		
2005	The Academy	Chan Yin-Ting	TVB		Supporting Role
2005	The Rainbow Connection 舞出彩虹	Ching Rui-suet	MediaCorp		third Female Lead
2005	The Gentle Crackdown 秀才遇著兵	Gam Ying	TVB	Nominated - TVB Anniversary Award for Best Supporting Actress (Top 5)	second Female Lead
2005	Into Thin Air 人間蒸發	Kong Lai-ping	TVB		Supporting Role
2007	The Brink of Law 突圍行動	Sung Gam-chi	TVB	Nominated - TVB Anniversary Award for Best Actress (Top 20); Nominated - Astor Wah Lai Toi Award for Best Villain	fourth Female Lead
2007	Heart of Greed 溏心風暴	Ling Lei 凌莉	TVB	Nominated - TVB Anniversary Award for My Favourite Female Character (Top 24)	1/3 of the Female Lead 三大女主角之一
2007	On the First Beat 學警出更	Chan Yin-ting 陳燕婷	TVB		Supporting Role
2007	ICAC Investigators 2007 廉政行動2007	Lei Yuet-kuen 李月娟	TVB		Female Lead
2008	Moonlight Resonance 溏心風暴之家好月圓	Yan Hung 殷紅	TVB	Won - TVB Anniversary Award for Best Actress; Won - Asian Television Awards 2009 for Best Actress; Won - Guangzhou TV Awards 2009 for Best Actress	1/3 of the Female Lead 三大女主角之一
2008	Love Tribulations 鎖清秋	Yin Shi-hong 殷惜紅	GZBN		third Female Lead
2009	Beyond the Realm of Conscience 宮心計	Chung Suet-ha 鍾雪霞	TVB	Nominated - TVB Anniversary Award for Best Supporting Actress (Top 5)	third Female Lead
2009	The Great Handmaiden 大丫鬟	Liang Yu-yu 梁玉茹	HNETV		third Female Lead
2010	The Season of Fate 五味人生	Wang Yeuk-lam 汪若嵐	TVB	Nominated - TVB Anniversary Award for Best Actress (Top 15); Nominated - My AOD Favourite Award for Best Actress (Top 12)	second Female Lead
2010	Beauty Knows No Pain 女人最痛	Wong Hoi-king, Noble 汪海鯨	TVB		Female Lead
2010-2011	Show Me the Happy 依家有喜	Chai Chuen, Anna 齊荃	TVB		Female Lead
2012	The Bride with White Hair	Ling Muhua	HSTV		Supporting Role
2012	The Confidant 大太監	Empress Dowager Cixi 慈禧太后	TVB	Nominated - TVB Anniversary Award for Best Actress (Top 5); Nominated - TVB Anniversary Award for My Favourite Female Character (Top 5); Nominated - My AOD Favourite Award for Best Actress (Top 12); Nominated - My AOD Favourite Award for My Favourite Television Character	Female Lead
2012	Palace II 宮鎖珠簾	Concubine Yun's mother 雲嬪母	HBS		
2012	Xuan-Yuan Sword: Scar of Sky	Nüwa			
2013	Earth God and Earth Grandmother				
2013	Triumph in the Skies II	Manna	TVB		Guest Star
2013-2014	Coffee Cat Mama	Marcia Ma	TVB		Female Lead
2015	Young Charioteers	Vivian Lee	TVB		1/2 of the Female Lead 兩大女主角之一
2015	Raja Pahat	Daeng	Radio Televisyen Malaysia (RTM)		
2015	Limelight Years	Ming Ha	TVB		Guest Star
2017	Tiger Mom Blues	Grandma	TVB		1/2 of the Female Lead 兩大女主角之一
2017	My Dearly Sinful Mind	Yuen Lai Seung	TVB		Guest Star
2017	Heart and Greed	Yu Sau-wai	TVB		1/3 of the Female Lead 三大女主角之一
2018	Deep in the Realm of Conscience	Empress Dowager Wei 韋皇后	TVB		Cameo Appearance 客串
2019	How Are You?	Xie Xiangyi 謝香怡	Mediacorp		Cameo Appearance 客串
2020	Forensic Heroes IV	Long Ying-suet 龍映雪	TVB		Special Appearance 特別演出
2020	Come Home Love: Lo and Behold	Herself 米雪	TVB		Special Appearance 特別演出 in episode 997
2021	Sinister Beings	Song Choi-suet 宋彩雪	TVB		Special Appearance 特別演出
2021	A Love of No Words	Chu Sa-kiu 朱莎嬌	TVB	Nominated - TVB Anniversary Award for Best Actress; Nominated - TVB Anniversary Award for My Favourite Female Character; Nominated - TVB Anniversary Award for Most Popular Onscreen Partnership (with Shek Sau); Nominated — TVB Anniversary Award for Favourite TVB Actress in Malaysia	Female Lead 女主角

== Musicals ==
Year	Title	Notes
1982	Madame White Snake 白蛇傳	
1990	Cyrano De Bergerac 美人如玉劍如虹	
1992	Tin Nui San Wah 天女散華	
1995	The Flirty Doctor 風流醫生手尾長	
1995	My Date With Spring 我和春天有個約會	
1996	Hu Du Men 虎度門	
2001	The Butterfly Lovers 梁祝	guest star
