= The Legend of the Condor Heroes (1976 TV series) =

1976 Hong Kong TV series

- Michelle Yim and Jason Pai as Huang Rong and Guo Jing respectively in the series
- 射鵰英雄傳
- Genre: Wuxia
- Based on: The Legend of the Condor Heroes by Jin Yong
- Starring: Jason Pai; Michelle Yim
- Theme music composer: James Wong Jim
- Opening theme: "Who is the Great Hero" (誰是大英雄) by Lam Muk
- Country of origin: Hong Kong
- Original language: Cantonese
- No. of episodes: 70

Production
- Production location: Hong Kong
- Running time: ≈45 minutes per episode
- Production company: CTV

Original release
- Network: CTV
- Release: 1976 – 1976

Related
- The Return of the Condor Heroes (1976)

The Legend of the Condor Heroes (射鵰英雄傳) is a Hong Kong wuxia television series adapted from the novel of the same title by Jin Yong. The series was first broadcast on CTV in Hong Kong in 1976 and starred Michelle Yim and Jason Pai. It was subsequently remade by TVB in 1983 as a three-part TV series.

== Cast ==
- Jason Pai as Guo Jing
- Michelle Yim as Huang Rong
- Bruce Leung as Yang Kang
- Mang Chau as Mu Nianci
- Michael Chan as Huang Yaoshi
- Yeung Chak-lam as Ouyang Feng
- Chan Fei-lung as Hong Qigong
- Chun Wong as Zhou Botong
- Chung Chi-keung as Yideng
- Cheng Lui as Wanyan Honglie
- Ling Hon as Genghis Khan
- Lam Yan-yan as Huazheng
- Lau Kong as Ouyang Ke
- Mak Tin-yan as Qiu Chuji
- Tong Kam-tong as Ma Yu
- Wu Yan-yan as Sun Bu'er
- Kenneth Tsang as Guo Xiaotian
- Yu Yan as Li Ping
- Paul Chun as Yang Tiexin
- Chen Sisi as Bao Xiruo
- Wong Man-wai as Yinggu
- Wan Chuen as Ke Zhen'e
- Kam San as Zhu Cong
- Kwong Wai-hung as Han Baoju
- Cheung Ching-yee as Han Xiaoying
- Wong Kwok-leung as Qiu Qianren / Qiu Qianzhang
- Hon Kwok-choi as Nan Xiren
- Law Lok-lam as Lu Youjiao
- Cho Tat-wah as Lu Chengfeng
- Cheung Man-ting as Mei Chaofeng
- Kan Yee-ching as Chen Xuanfeng
- Cheung Hung-cheung as Lu Guanying
- Chan Yuk-wai as Shagu
- Yeung See as Jebe
- Ko Hung as Sha Tongtian
- Kiu Hung as Hou Tonghai
- Wan Fat as Lingzhi Shangren
