= Kowloon Tong =

Area in Hong Kong

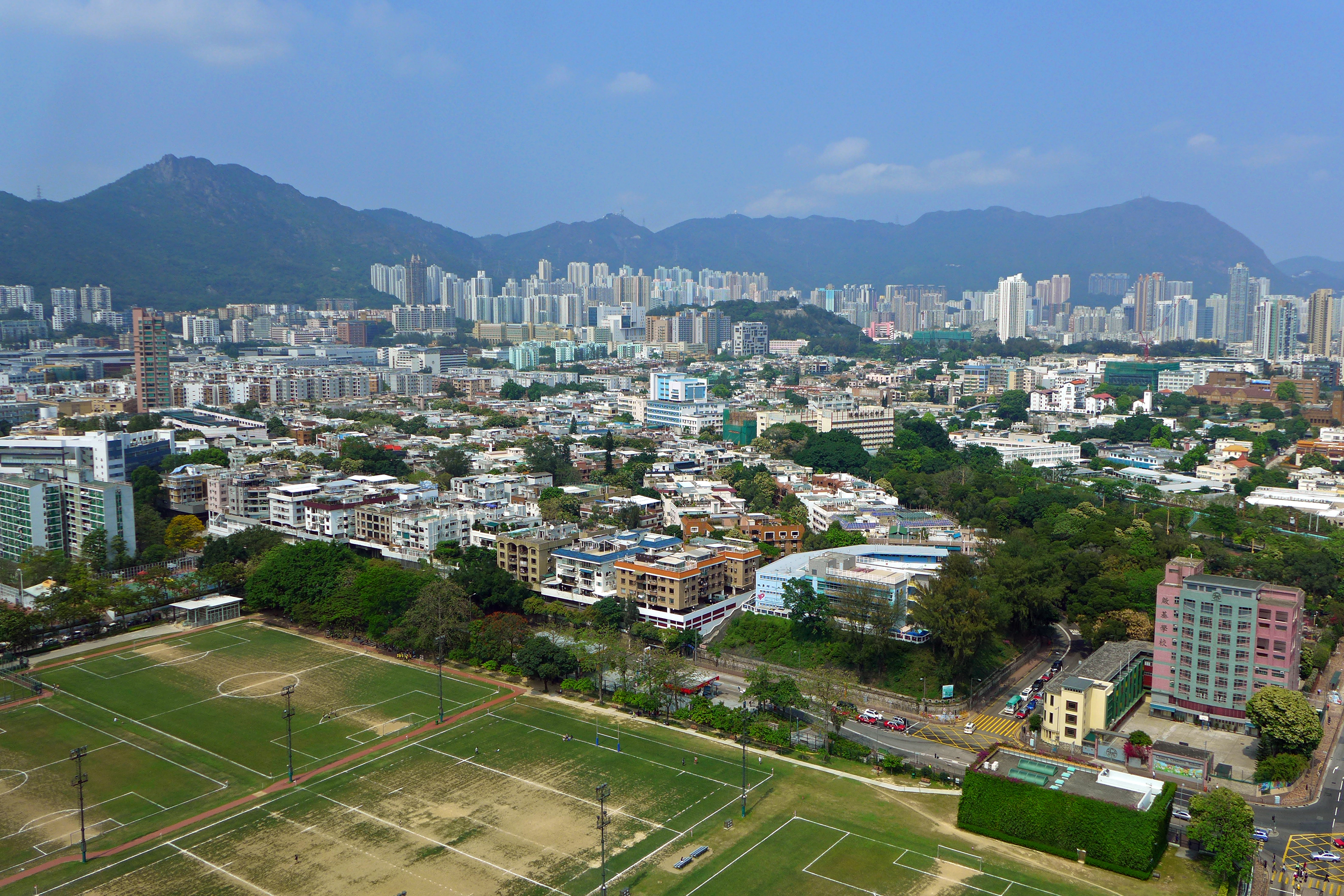
- Kowloon Tong
- Traditional Chinese: 九龍塘
- Simplified Chinese: 九龙塘
- Literal meaning: Nine Dragons' Pond
Transcriptions
Standard Mandarin
- Hanyu Pinyin: Jiǔlóng Táng
- Wade–Giles: Chiulung T'ang
Wu
- Wugniu: cieu^{3} lon^{2} daon^{2}
Yue: Cantonese
- Yale Romanization: Gáulùng Tòng
- Jyutping: Gau2lung4 Tong4
- IPA: [kɐ̌ulʊ̏ŋ tʰɔ̏ːŋ]

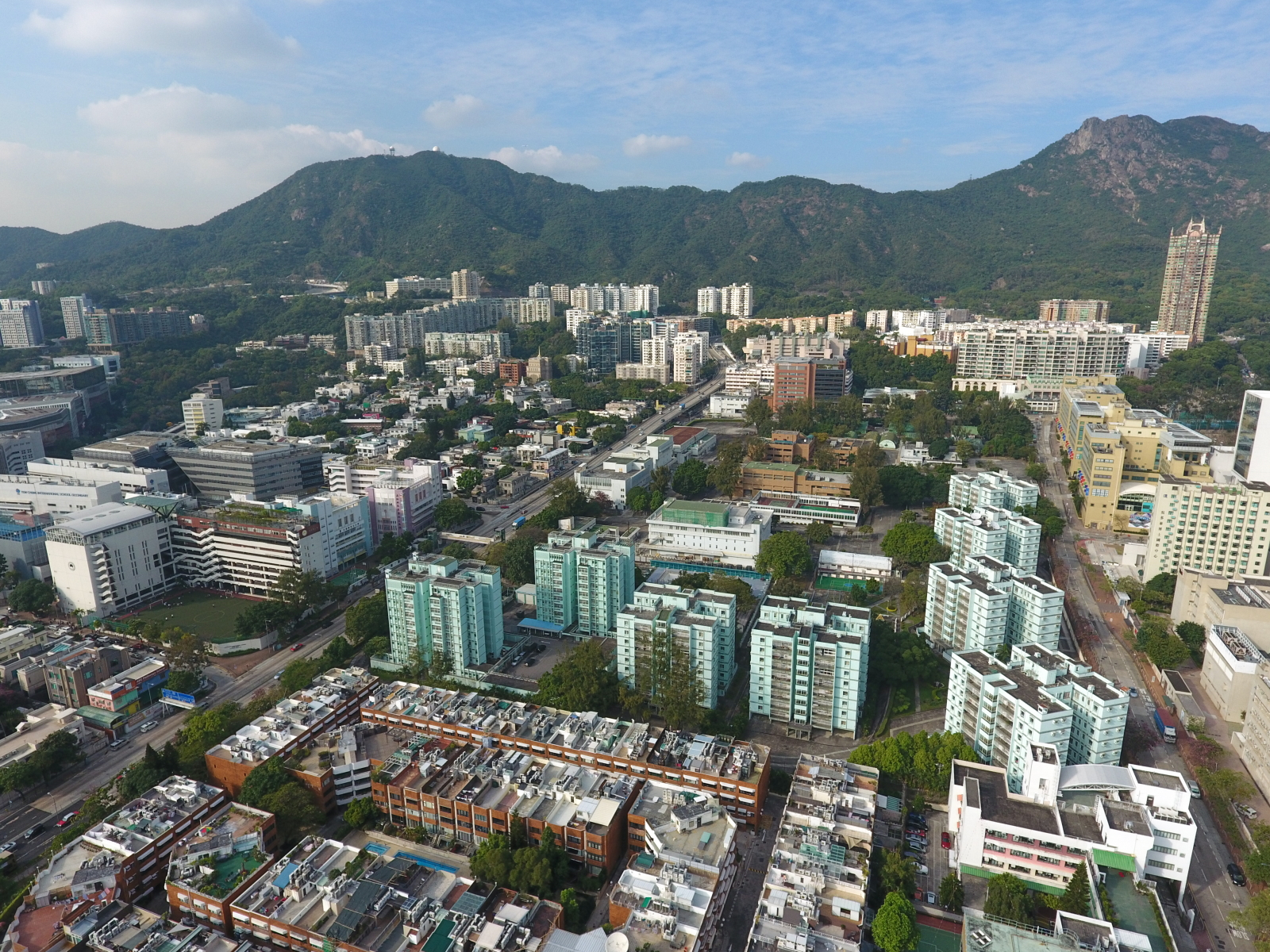
North part of Kowloon Tong. Lion Rock is visible in the background.

Kowloon Tong (Chinese: 九龍塘; Jyutping: gau^{2} lung^{4} tong^{4}) is an affluent area of Hong Kong located in Kowloon. The majority of the area is in the Kowloon City District. Its exact location is south of the Lion Rock, north of Boundary Street, east of the East Rail line and west of Grampian Road. It is one of the most expensive residential districts in Hong Kong.

It is popular among Hong Kong's wealthy residents because of its schools and low-density private housing. Most of the buildings there do not exceed 10 floors. In addition, this area is noted for its private schools and nursing homes. Within Kowloon West, it is administratively divided between Kowloon City District and Sham Shui Po District, bisected by the Kowloon–Canton Railway.

== History ==
Kowloon Tong was originally a small village located in present-day Police Sport Association near Boundary Street, south of Woh Chai Hill. The area allowed cultivation based on rivers running down from Beacon Hill.

At the time of the 1911 census, the population of Kowloon Tong was 185.

In the 1920s, the Hong Kong Government developed the area of east of Kowloon Tong and Kowloon Tsai on both sides of Kowloon–Canton Railway into a low density residential area (based on British town planning of the time). The residential area is thus known as Kowloon Tong. The area's roads and streets are largely named after counties in England. It was the home of a large number of wealthy English businessmen.

The name of Kowloon Tsai is preserved in the hill west of the former village of Kowloon Tsai. Martial artist Bruce Lee's residence was located in Kowloon Tong during the 70s.

== Landmarks ==
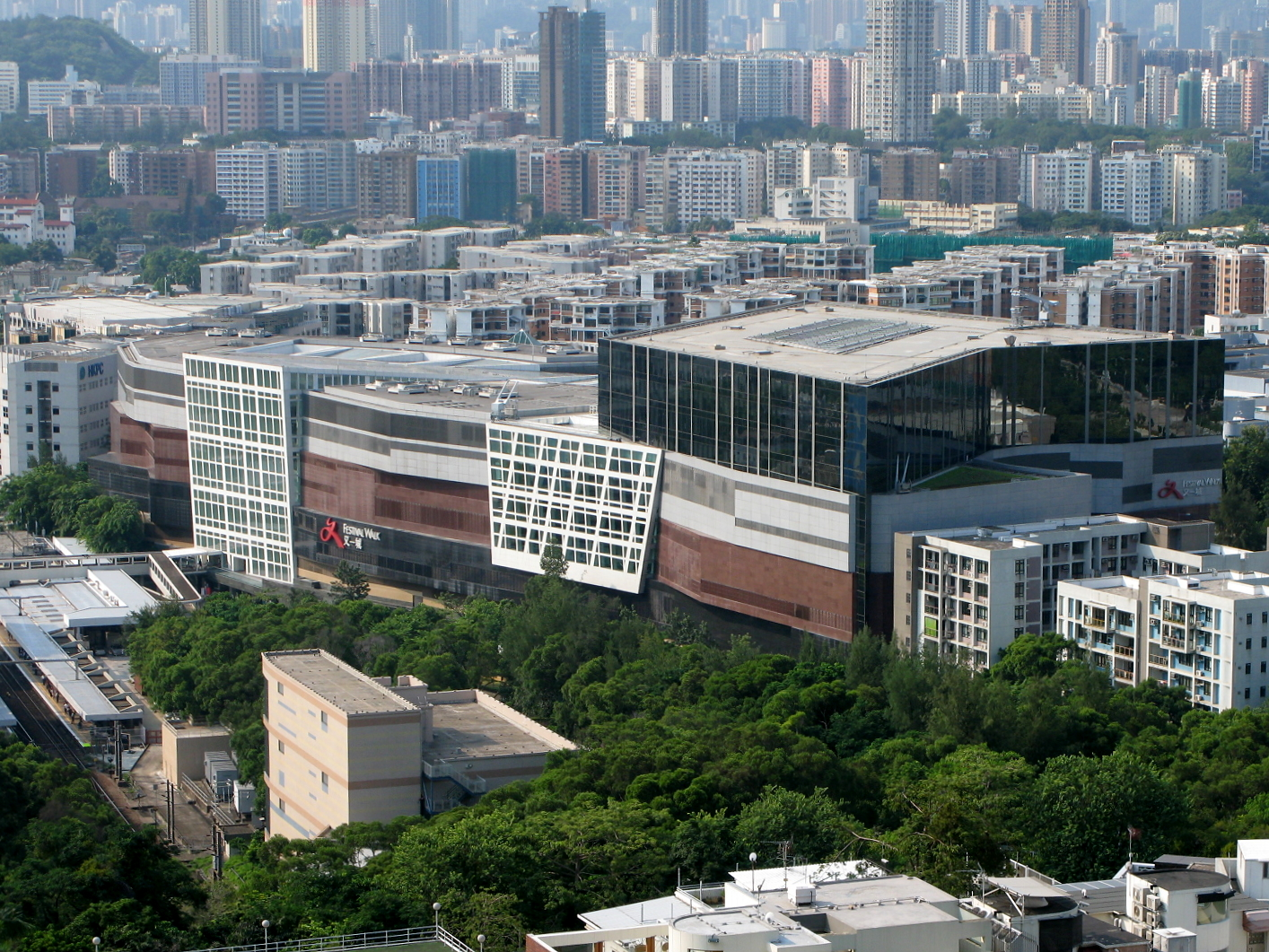
Festival Walk in Kowloon Tong.

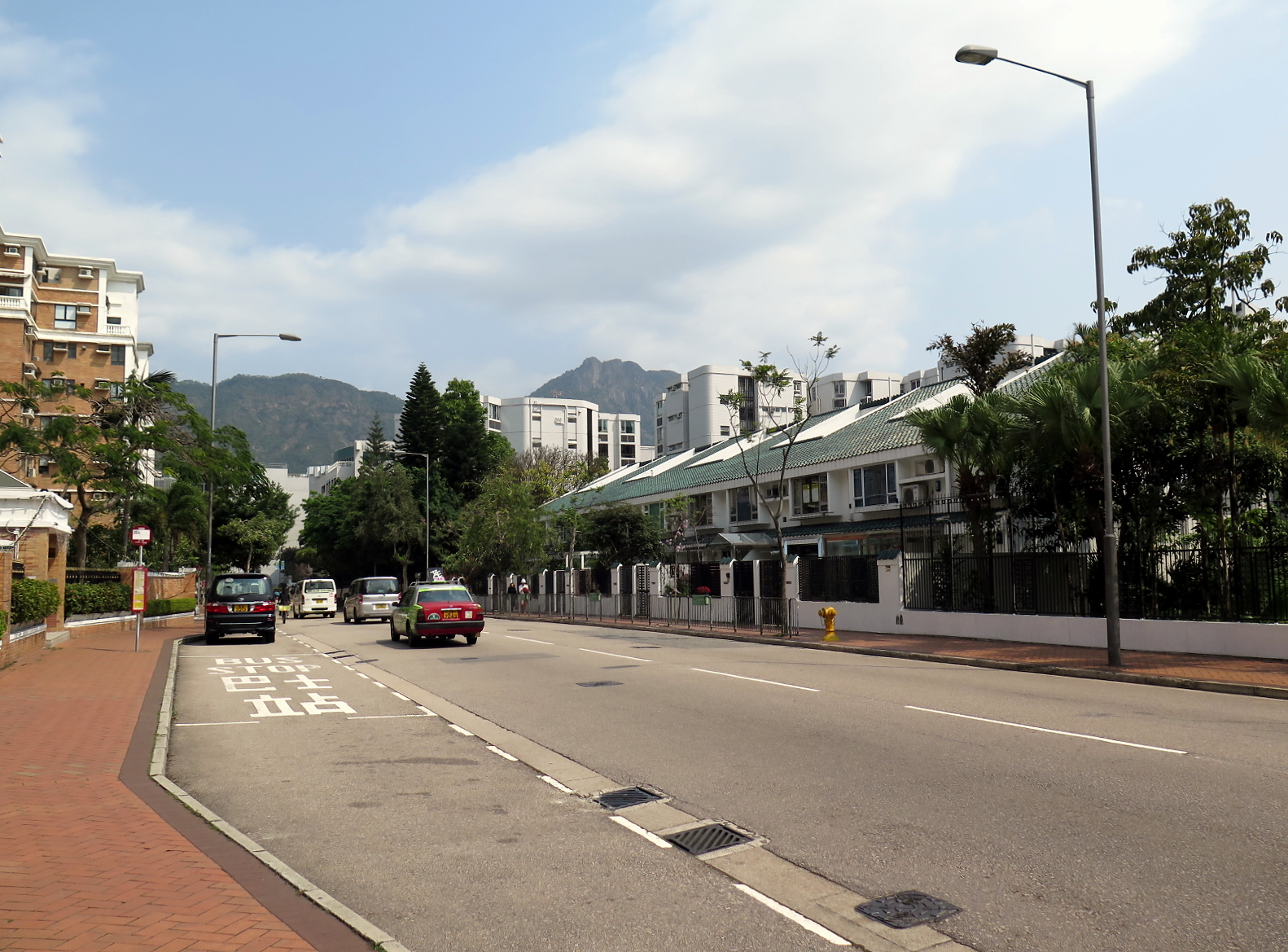
Tat Chee Avenue

Notable landmarks in Kowloon Tong include:

- Beacon Hill — a hill with a height of 457 m, and several residential developments.
- Festival Walk — a large shopping centre operated by Swire Group and CITIC, now owned by Singaporean investment firm Mapletree.
- Broadcast Drive — a road where all of Hong Kong's free-to-air TV stations (TVB, ATV), Hong Kong's oldest radio station (Radio Television Hong Kong), and Commercial Radio Hong Kong were once headquartered at the same time.
- St. Teresa's Church
- 41 Cumberland Road, Bruce Lee's former home in Hong Kong. Demolished in 2019.

== Media ==
The two biggest radio companies in Hong Kong, Commercial Radio Hong Kong and Radio Television Hong Kong, are both located on Broadcast Drive, Kowloon Tong. Minibus route 29A serves Broadcast Drive from MTR Kowloon Tong station.

== Education ==
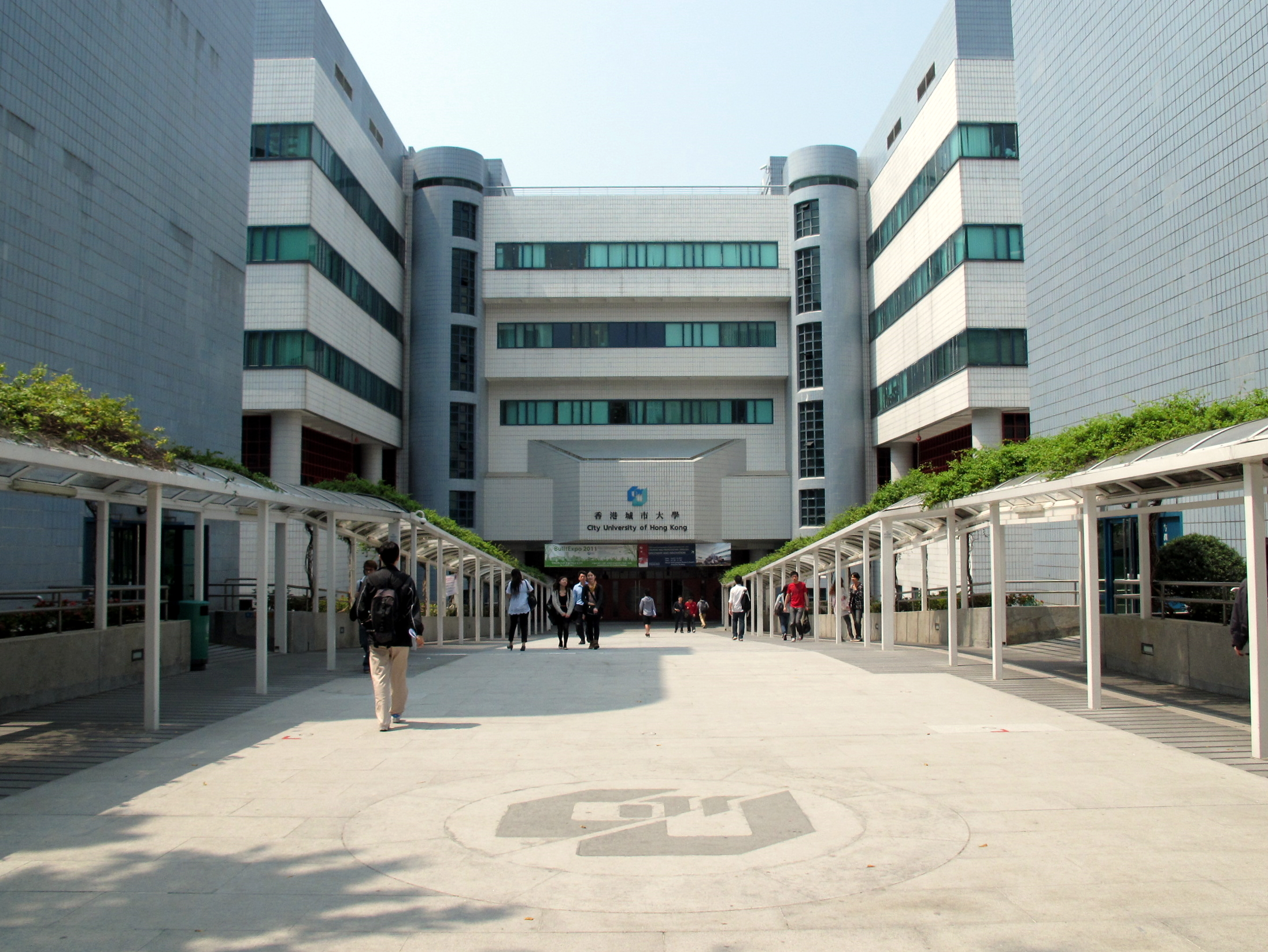
City University of Hong Kong

The Hong Kong Baptist University and the City University of Hong Kong are located in Kowloon Tong. Many leading local English medium of instruction (EMI) primary and secondary schools on the Kowloon peninsula are located in the area, including Kowloon True Light Middle School, Kowloon Tong School (Secondary Section), Maryknoll Convent School, La Salle College and Beacon Hill School. Other well known international schools in the area include the American International School, Yew Chung International School, Concordia International School, Australian International School, and the Delia School of Canada.

Kowloon Tong is in Primary One Admission (POA) School Net 41. Within the school net are multiple aided schools (operated independently but funded with government money) and Kowloon Tong Government Primary School.

=== Schools ===
Kindergarten

- Kentville Kindergarten
- St. Nicolas English Kindergarten
- York International Kindergarten
- Tutor Time International Nursery & Kindergarten
- SDM-Chatsworth International Kindergarten
- Kingston International Kindergarten and Kingston Children Centre

International schools

- American International School Hong Kong
- Australian International School Hong Kong
- Yew Chung International School

Primary schools

- Alliance Primary School, Kowloon Tong
- Kowloon Tong Government Primary School
- Kowloon Tong School (Primary Section)
- Kowloon Tong School (Secondary Section)
- Kingston International School

Secondary schools

- Holy Family Canossian School
- Kowloon True Light Middle School
- Kowloon Tong School (Secondary Section)
- United Christian College (Kowloon East)
- Kowloon Tong School (Secondary Section)

== Transport ==
Kowloon Tong is served by two rail lines: the MTR's East Rail line and Kwun Tong line at Kowloon Tong station. Passengers may change here between the two lines. The stretch of Waterloo Road through Kowloon Tong forms part of Hong Kong's Route 1. It leads into the Lion Rock Tunnel, and as such serves as an important artery for traffic heading into and out of the New Territories (in particular Sha Tin). Yau Ma Tei is also accessible via Waterloo Road.

== Streets ==
Streets in Kowloon Tong include:

- Boundary Street, partially in Kowloon Tong
- Cumberland road
- Waterloo Road, partially in Kowloon Tong
- York Road (約道) (see also Henry Tang illegal basement controversy)
- Cornwall Street
- Tat Chee Avenue
- Kent Road
- Broadcast Drive

== See also ==
- List of places in Hong Kong
- Kowloon City
- Mong Kok
- Yau Yat Tsuen
