= Tai Chi Master (TV series) =

- 太極張三豐
- Genre: Ancient drama
- Opening theme: (太極張三豐 & 遊俠張三豐.) by Johnny Yip
- Country of origin: Hong Kong
- Original language: Cantonese
- No. of episodes: 30

Original release
- Network: Rediffusion Television / ATV
- Release: December 15, 1980

Tai Chi Master (太極張三豐) is a classic Rediffusion Television series aired in Hong Kong in 1980. The series helped boost the popularity of Rediffusion TV right before the station was converting over to become ATV. Numerous sequels and spawns have followed since its release. (such as Tai Chi Master 2 遊俠張三豐.)

== Summary ==
The story revolves around Yuan-bo (Alex Man) who starts off as a young monk from Shaolin temple with some knowledge of tai chi. He soon meets general Chang Yuchun and become a student of To Cek-lun (陶石麟). Yuan-bo falls in love with his daughter To Choi-yi (陶綵衣). A number of adversaries later tried to kill Yuan-bo. He can only fight them off by becoming the supreme Taoist Tai chi master.

== Legacy ==
The series being a classic helped Alex Man and Michelle Yim extend their popularity well into the 1980s era. Most memorable was the opening song composed by Michael Lai (黎小田), lyrics written by Lou Gwok-zim (盧國沾) and sung by Johnny Yip (葉振棠). The song have since been re-released on numerous albums.

In Hong Kong the series would later spawn the 1981 direct sequel Taichi Master II starring Alex Man, Amy Chan and Leslie Cheung with a Chinese knight-errant theme. Another reproduction is Tai Chi Master the movie, starring Jet Li and Michelle Yeoh filmed more than a decade later using the same name.

== Cast ==
Cast	Role	Description
Alex Man	Cheung Yuan-bo (張君寶)	
Michelle Yim	To Choi-yi (陶綵衣)	
Cho Tat Wah	Buddhist Monk Hong-ming (空明和尚)	
(楊澤霖)	Prince Fok-dou (霍都王子)	
Lo Lieh	(哈赤兒)	
(劉國誠)	General Chang Yuchun	
Law Lok-lam (羅樂林)	Chu Yuan-chang	
Ng Wui (吳回)	To Cek-lun (陶石麟)	
(鮑漢琳)	(也先王爺)	
Eddy Ko	(濟深和尚)	
(周慧娟)	(周若)	
(麥天恩)	(高米拉)	
(蔣金)	Emperor	
