= On the Road (web series) =

- 侣行
- Genre: Reality show
- Country of origin: China
- Original language: Mandarin

Original release
- Network: Youku
- Release: June 2013

On the Road (Chinese: 侣行; pinyin: lvxing) is a Chinese internet reality show. It was produced by Zhangxinyu and Lianghong. The show was released in June 2013 on Youku.
