= On the Road (Hong Kong TV series) =

- 向世界出發
- Genre: Travel
- Music by: Earthflame
- Country of origin: Hong Kong
- Original language: Cantonese

Production
- Running time: Approx. 30 Minutes (Commercial free)

Original release
- Network: TVB
- Release: 2006 – 2008

On the Road (Chinese: 向世界出發) is a Chinese Cantonese-language travel television program produced by Television Broadcasts Limited in Hong Kong. The show aired for three seasons between 2006 and 2008. The meaning of the Chinese title is "Set off to the World", which gives a sense of the start of a journey to different parts of the global, experiencing different cultures and customs of different nations.

== Premise ==
The show differs from the typical travel series produced by TVB, as it deals mainly with philosophical and life issues, rather than sightseeing and entertainment. The show would use a particular location's social life or struggles to bring out the intended topic for a particular arc.

Although rival television station ATV has made travel series based on relatively the same premises, this is the first time a series based on this genre received high ratings, mainly due to the dominant ratings advantage TVB has enjoyed since the advent of television broadcasting in Hong Kong.

== Episodes ==
=== Season 1 (2006) ===
Theme	Place Visited	Host	First Run Date
Life and Death	Qinghai, China	Law Kar-ying	11 April - 17 April
Is Beauty a Crime?	Northern Thailand	Kathy Chow, Carrie Lam	18 April - 21 April
Love, Hope, and Faith at The Vatican	Vatican City	Law Lan	24 April - 27 April
Acrobats, Children, Dream	Wuqiao, China	Karena Lam	
What is to be Rich	Dubai, United Arab Emirates	Ha Yu	
How to find Happiness	Italy	Myolie Wu	
Marry or not Marry?	India	Michelle Yim	
Brotherhood and Chivalry	Phuket, Thailand	Ekin Cheng	

=== Season 2 (2007) ===
Theme	Place Visited	Host	First Run Date
Returning Home Through Love	Cambodia	Nicholas Tse	
The King & I	Brunei	Eric Tsang	
Stations of the Cross in Israel	Israel	Ada Choi	
Love, in the Kingdom of Women	Yunnan, China	Gigi Leung	
Success and Failure	Mauritius	Liu Wai Hung	
Ancient City and the Performance Art	Kyoto, Japan	Liza Wang	
Drum & Dance on the Yellow River	Loess Plateau, China	Sammul Chan	

=== Season 3 (2008) ===
Theme	Place Visited	Host	First Run Date
Freedman in the Sahara	Sahara, Africa	Kathy Chow	
The last foot-binding village	Yunnan, China	Angie Chiu	
Lost in Eastern India	East India	Daniel Chan	
Kindness without scale	Guizhou, China	Yu Mo-lin	
Amorous, joyful, Mexico	Mexico	Patrick Tse	
Cuba Dangerous	Cuba	Lawrence Cheng	
Walking with Beasts	Thailand	Alex Fong Lik-Sun	
Enlightenment	South Korea	Eunice Lam	
