= On the Road (2025 Indian film) =

- Theatrical release poster
- Directed by: Surya Lakkoju
- Written by: Surya Lakkoju
- Produced by: SPL Pictures
- Starring: Raghav Tiwari; Swati Mehra; Karn Shastri; Ravi Singh; Rahul Kumar; S. S. Angchok
- Cinematography: Gifty Mehra
- Edited by: Mandar Sawant
- Music by: Surbhit Manocha; Naveen Kumar
- Production company: SPL Pictures
- Release date: 10 October 2025
- Country: India
- Language: Telugu

On the Road is a 2025 Indian Telugu-language road thriller film written and directed by Surya Lakkoju and produced under the banner of SPL Pictures. The film stars Raghav Tiwari and Swati Mehra in the lead roles, with Karn Shastri, Ravi Singh, Rahul Kumar, and S. S. Angchok in supporting roles. It is noted for being the first Indian feature film shot entirely in Ladakh. The project is promoted as a visually striking road-trip thriller set in the challenging terrain of the Himalayas.

== Plot ==
The film follows a seemingly ordinary man who joins a couple on a long road trip through Ladakh. What begins as a peaceful journey gradually turns into a series of dangerous and chaotic events. The story explores suspense, betrayal, and survival against the breathtaking backdrop of the Himalayas.

== Cast ==
- Raghav Tiwari
- Swati Mehra
- Karn Shastri
- Ravi Singh
- Rahul Kumar
- S. S. Angchok

== Production ==
The film is directed by Surya Lakkoju and produced by SPL Pictures. Principal photography took place across various locations in Ladakh, making it the first Indian film to be shot entirely in the region. The film will be released in multiple Indian languages including Telugu, Hindi, Tamil, Kannada, and Malayalam.

== Music ==
The music is composed by Surbhit Manocha, with cinematography by Gifty Mehra and editing by Mandar Sawant. The soundtrack complements the film's road-thriller theme and scenic Himalayan visuals.

== Release ==
On the Road was released theatrically on 10 October 2025.

== Reception ==
Following its release, On the Road received mixed-to-positive reviews from critics.

Sakshi Post called the film "a romantic crime thriller that shifts gears effectively," commending its emotional depth and strong visuals while noting that the pacing dips in parts.

OTTplay rated the film 2.5 out of 5, writing that On the Road "boasts great visuals but limited thrills." The review mentioned that the first half engages emotionally, while the second half delivers better tension and atmosphere.

The Hans India described the film as "a scenic ride of emotions, suspense, and raw human drama," applauding its visual grandeur and character-driven storytelling.
